= Taensa =

Historic Native American tribe from Louisiana

Taensa

Regions with significant populations
- United States (Louisiana, Alabama)

Languages
- Natchez (Taensa), Mobilian Jargon

Religion
- Indigenous religion

Related ethnic groups
- Natchez

The Taensa were an Indigenous people of the Southeastern Woodlands, whose settlements at the time of European contact in the late 17th century were located in present-day Tensas Parish, Louisiana. The meaning of the name, which has the further spelling variants of Taenso, Tinsas, Tenza or Tinza, Tahensa or Takensa, and Tenisaw, is unknown. It is believed to be an autonym. The Taensa should not be confused with the Avoyel (or Avoyelles), known by the French as the petits Taensas (English: Little Taensa), who were mentioned in writings by explorer Pierre Le Moyne d'Iberville in 1699. The Taensa are more closely related to the Natchez people and both are considered descendants of the late precontact Plaquemine culture.

The Taensa migrated as a result of Chickasaw and Yazoo hostilities, first lower down the Mississippi River. In 1715, protected by the French, they migrated to lands near the now eponymously named Tensaw River near Mobile, Alabama. When the French ceded Mobile and their other territory east of the Mississippi River to the British in 1763, following their defeat in the Seven Years' War, the Taensa and other small tribes returned to Louisiana, settling near the Red River. They numbered about 100 persons in 1805. They later moved south to Bayou Boeuf and later still to Grand Lake, "after which the remnant disappear[ed] from history."

== Name ==
The Taensa were also called Taënsas, Tensas, Tensaw, and Grands Taensas in French.

The meaning of the name Taensa is unknown, although some anthropologists and linguists believe it is an autonym. The Chitimacha, the group with which they eventually merged, referred to them by the exonym Chō´sha.

== History ==
=== Precontact ===
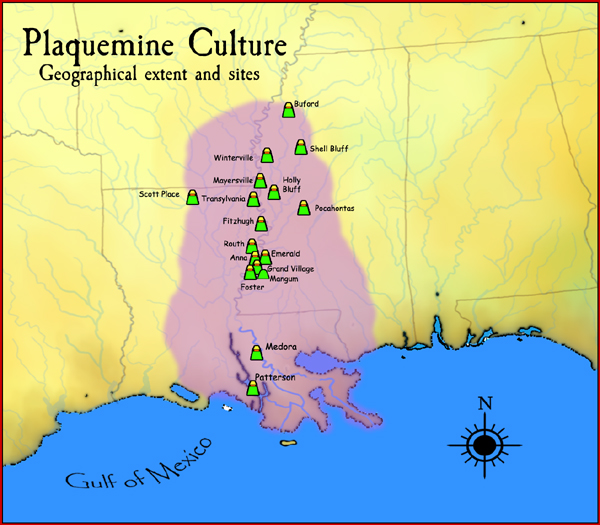
Geographic extent of the Plaquemine culture and some of its major sites in the Lower Mississippi River valley

The Taensa and the closely related Natchez are descendants of the late precontact Plaquemine culture (1200–1700 CE). The Plaquemine culture was a Mississippian culture variant centered on the Lower Mississippi River valley. They had complex political and religious institutions and lived in large villages centered on ceremonial platform mounds. They were primarily agriculturists who grew maize, pumpkins, squash, beans and tobacco. They had a deep history in the area stretching back through the earlier Coles Creek (700–1200 CE) and Troyville cultures (400–700 CE) to the Marksville culture (100 BCE to 400 CE), which was contemporaneous with the Hopewell cultures of present-day Ohio and Illinois.

The Tensas Basin region where their villages were found has several Coles Creek and Plaquemine era ceremonial sites with platform mounds located very nearby, including the Coles Creek era Balmoral Mounds (occupied c. 700 and 1200 CE), and the Plaquemine era Routh Mounds (occupied c. 1200 to 1350 CE) and Flowery Mound (occupied c. 1200–1541) sites.

=== Protohistory ===
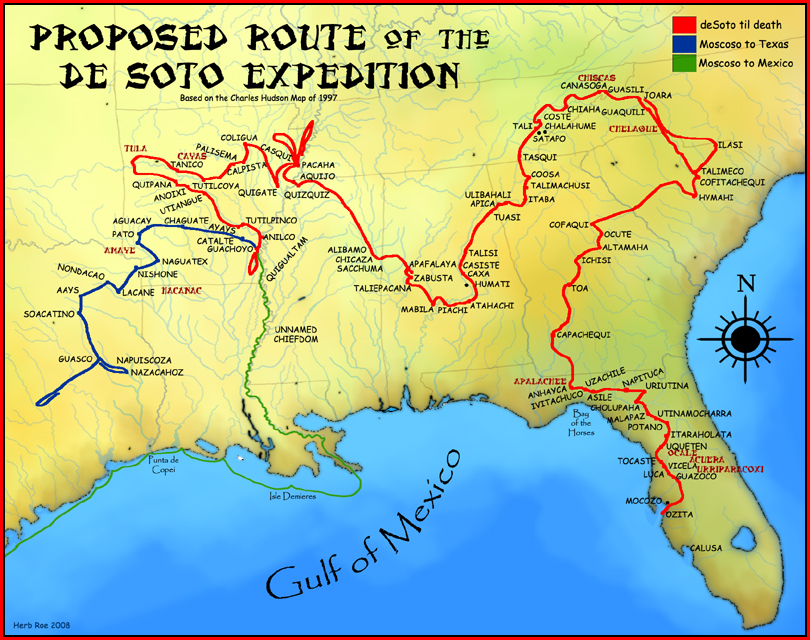
A map showing the de Soto route through the Southeast

The post-Hernando de Soto entrada Transylvania Phase (1550-1700 CE) of the Tensas Basin saw the increasing spread of Mississippian influences diffusing southward from Arkansas and northwestern Mississippi. The Jordan Mounds site on a relict channel of the Arkansas River in northeastern Louisianas Morehouse Parish was constructed during the protohistoric period between 1540 and 1685. The builders were an intrusive group in the area, Mississippianized peoples who were possibly refugees from the Mississippi River area to the east and were escaping the collapse of their society brought about by the aftereffects of European contact. By the late 1600s the site was abandoned.

Historians and archaeologists such as Marvin Jeter have theorized that the Plaquemine "Northern Natchezan" ancestors of the Taensa were in part some of the peoples documented in the early 1540s by the de Soto expedition in southeastern Arkansas and northwestern Mississippi. After the disastrous encounter and subsequent population crash due to the introduction of European diseases and political upheaval left in de Soto's wake, remnant populations of Northern Natchezans migrated down the Mississippi toward their Southern Natchezan cousins.

=== European contact ===
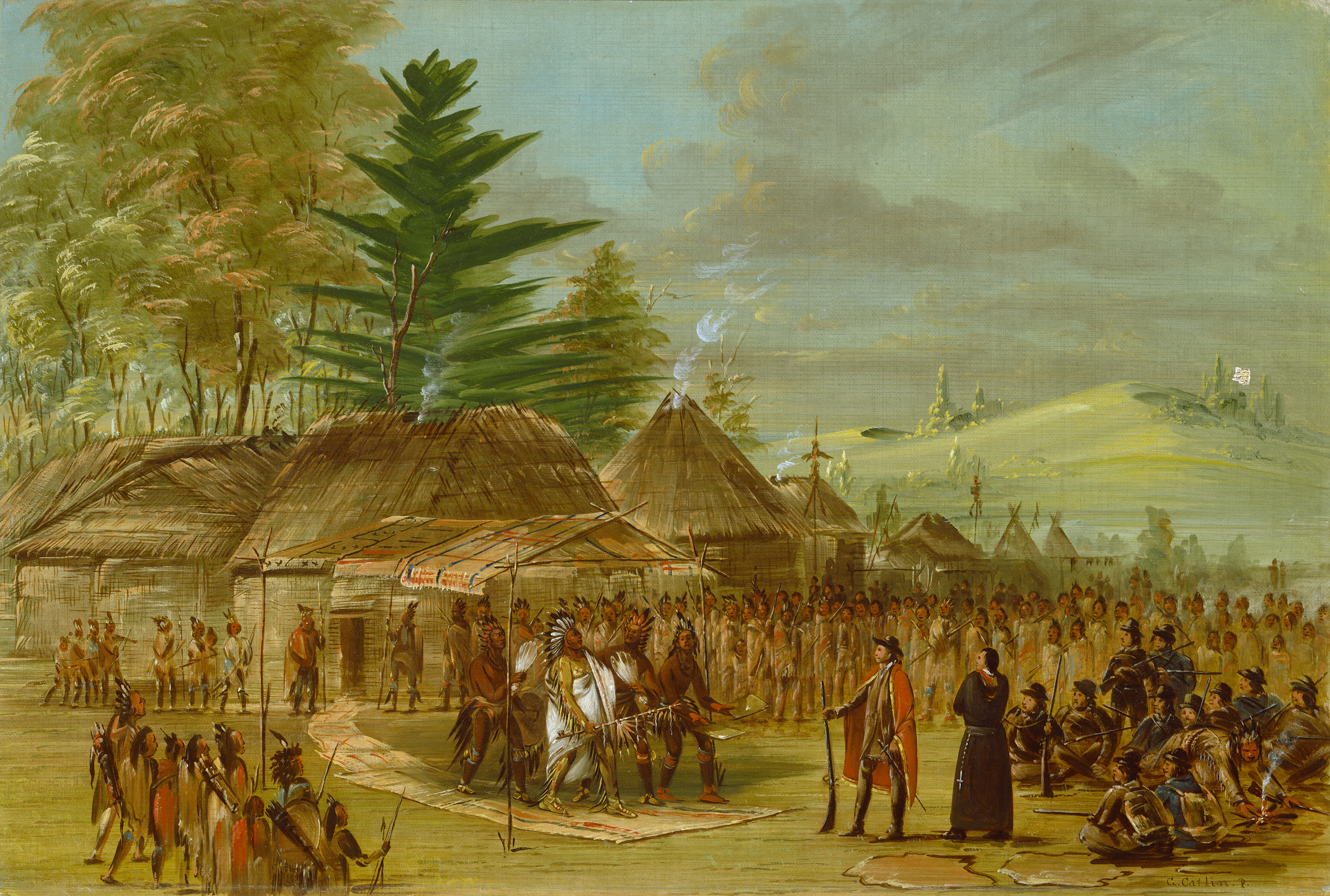
Imagined meeting of La Salle with the Taensa, by artist George Catlin c. 1847

The first securely documented European contact with the Taensa was by the French La Salle expedition of 1682. They were described as having a village on Lake St. Joseph, a narrow crescent shaped oxbow lake located west of the Mississippi, between the Yazoo River and Saint Catherine Creek (near Newellton in modern Tensas Parish, Louisiana). On March 22, 1682, a recollect chaplain who accompanied LaSalle, Father Zenobius, preached to the tribe at this location. La Salles associate Henri de Tonti visited the Taensa again in 1686 and 1690. They numbered approximately 1,200 people scattered throughout seven or eight villages on the western end of the lake and another on the Tensas River near present-day Clayton in Concordia Parish.

In 1698 French Catholic missionary priests Antoine Davion and François de Montigny and J. B. La Source (a lay person and possible servant to the priests) visited the Taensa; de Montigny founded a short-lived mission among them. De Montigny at that time records their population as being 700 people. In 1699 French explorer Pierre Le Moyne d'Iberville recorded the Taensa as having 300 warriors and living in seven villages named as Taensas, Chaoucoula, Conchayon, Couthaougoula, Nyhougoula, Ohytoucoulas, and Talaspa. The majority of these names are in the Muskogean Mobilian Jargon and not the Natchezan Taensa language.

During his time with the Taensa, de Montigny prevented them from performing acts of ritual human sacrifice as part of the funeral rites for a deceased chief. Because of this, the Taensa later blamed de Montigny when lightning struck their wattle and daub temple and burned it down. He left to join the Natchez in 1790, and his mission to the Taensa was taken over by Jean-François Buisson de Saint-Cosme. Along with other native peoples of the lower Mississippi River, the Taensa were subject to slave raids and epidemics of European diseases such as smallpox during this time period. As the population of the Taensa steadily decreased, de Saint-Cosme in 1700 endeavored in vain to have them join with the much larger Natchez and consolidate the two missions. De Saint-Cosme settled among the Taensa and the Natchez for less than a year before leaving.

=== Later history ===
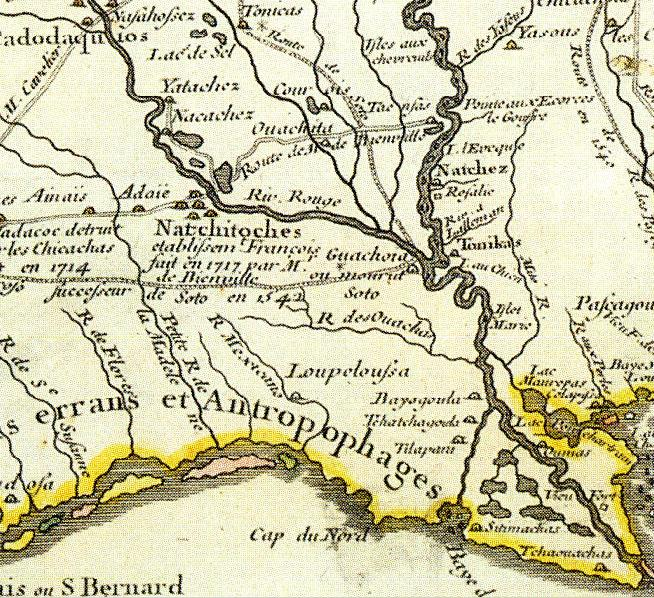
Period map showing the location of the Taensa, Natchez, Tunica, Yazoo, and Bayougoula

During the late 17th and early 18th centuries, French colonists in the American Southeast initiated a power struggle with those living in the colony of Carolina. Traders from Carolina had established a large trading network among the indigenous peoples of the American Southeast, and by 1700 it stretched west as far as the Mississippi River. The Chickasaw tribe, who lived north of the Taensa, were frequently visited by Carolinian traders, thus giving them access to a source of firearms and alcohol. One of the most lucrative trades with Carolinian merchants involved trading in Indian slaves. For decades, the Chickasaw conducted slave raids over a wide region in the American Southeast, often being joined by allied Natchez and Yazoo warriors. These raiding parties moved over great distances to capture slaves from hostile tribes, such as the Taensa. In 1706, fearing a slaver raid by a combined force of Chickasaw and Yazoo raiders, the Taensa abandoned their village on Lake St. Joseph. They headed south to seek shelter with the Bayogoula at their village on the western bank of the Mississippi, roughly 25 miles (40 km) south of present-day Baton Rouge. Conflicts soon developed, and the Taensa attacked and nearly exterminated the Bayogoula peoples and burned their village down—an act described as treacherous by later historians.

Though their initial relations with the Europeans had been friendly, the rivalry of the European powers strained native populations throughout the region. The Taensa ultimately migrated in 1715, under the protection of the French, to lands near modern Mobile on an eastern branch of the Mobile River north of Mobile Bay that was subsequently named for them as the Tensaw River. In 1763 the French ceded the eastern half of French Louisiana to the British following their defeat in the Seven Years' War. The Taensa, along with the Apalachee and Pakana, relocated again, this time west of the Mississippi to French territory on the Red River. There they eventually merged with the Chitimacha. According to historian James Mooney, they numbered about 100 persons in 1805.

Early in the nineteenth century, the Taensa petitioned the Spanish colonial authorities for land on which to settle in southeastern Texas; they were given permission to settle land lying between the Trinity and the Sabine rivers, but ultimately did not migrate. This was the last appearance of the tribe in historical records. They later moved south to Bayou Boeuf and later still to Grand Lake, "after which the remnant disappear[ed] from history."

== Culture ==
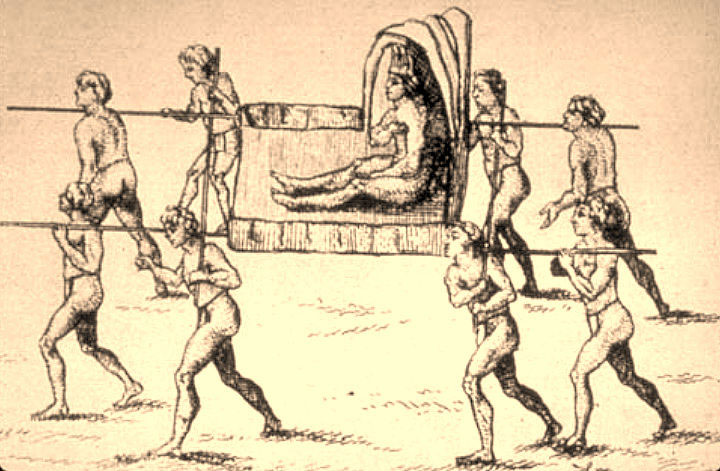
Drawing of the "Natchez Great Sun being carried in a litter", by du Pratz

The Taensa were a Natchezan people who separated from the main body of the Natchez sometime prior to European contact with the Lower Mississippi Valley region. As such their languages, political, religious, and material cultures were very similar to the Natchez. When they first enter the historical record they are found just to the northwest of the Natchez and on the western bank of the Mississippi as opposed to its eastern bank.

Like some other inhabitants of the area, such as the Natchez, Tunica, and Houma, Taensa society was matrilineal. Taensa society was also very hierarchical and showed marked class differences between commoners and elites, hallmarks of being a simple chiefdom. Chiefs exercised absolute power and were treated with great respect; unlike more egalitarian customs among the northern tribes the early chroniclers were used to. An example of this respect was recorded during a ceremonial visit by a chief to visit the explorer René-Robert Cavelier, Sieur de La Salle, when attendants came several hours in advance of the chief and with their hands swept the road clean.

=== Ceramics ===
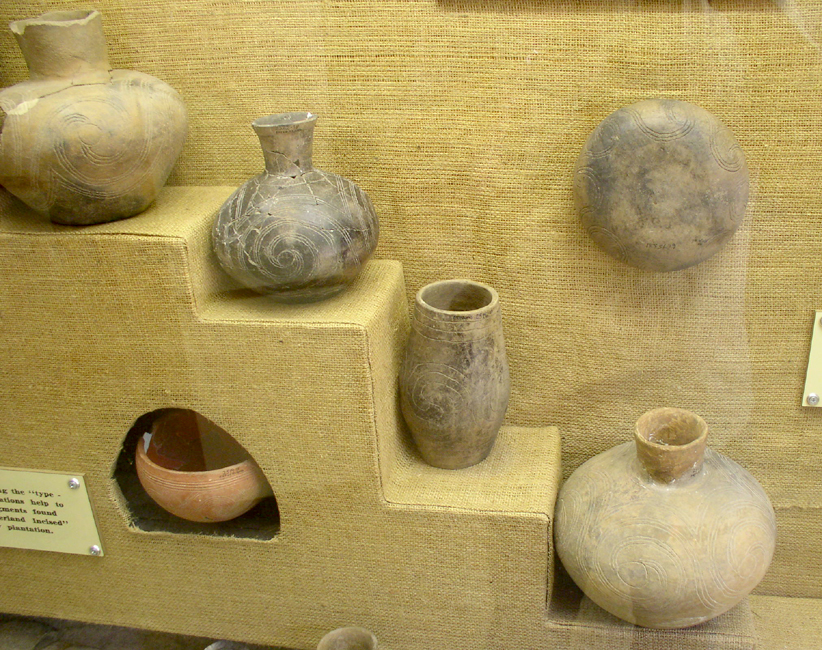
Pottery showing engraved Plaquemine designs from the Grand Village of the Natchez Site.

The beginning of the Transylvania Phase (1550-1700 CE) of the Tensas Basin region saw the increasing spread of Mississippian influences diffusing southward from what is now southeastern Arkansas. This is most identifiable in ceramic traditions. The Mississippian peoples of the Central Mississippi Valley used different vessel forms, tempering agents, and decorations than the Plaquemine peoples of the Lower Mississippi Valley. By the late 17th century these changes in ceramic technology had reached the Taensa in the Lower Tensas Basin. The pottery of the Taensa was made with typical Mississippian culture pottery shapes and used the Mississippian hallmark of crushed mussel shell as a tempering agent, but was still being engraved with decorative designs typical of the Plaquemine area. Pottery from the Natchez sites of nearby western Mississippi still used the traditional Plaquemine grog tempering and decorative designs. On this basis the Taensa are considered to be the last Mississippian culture group to inhabit the Tensas River valley of Louisiana.

=== Architecture ===
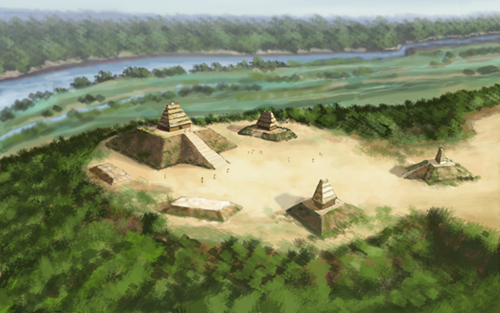
The Proto-Natchezan Anna site (1200-1500 CE) showing the temple mound and plaza arrangement of Plaquemine sites

The Taensa were sedentary maize-growing agriculturalists as opposed to hunter gatherers and lived in permanent villages with wattle-and-daub buildings. These structures were up to 30 feet (9.1 m) in length and 20 feet (6.1 m) in height and made from logs plastered in clay with roofs of woven split rivercane matting. Their village on Lake St Joseph is described as fitting the same dispersed hamlet pattern of the Natchez. It stretched for 3 miles (4.8 km) on the western lake shore with neighborhoods being interspersed with fields and forest. The main precinct had a log palisade, inside of which was the chiefs residence, the temple, and eight other structures. Like other Native Americans in the southeast it also had an open plaza area used for public rituals and functions such as the Green Corn Ceremony and games such as chunkey and the ballgame.

This pattern of plazas flanked by mounds with temples, elite residences and mortuary structures at their summits was inherited from their Plaquemine and Coles Creek ancestors, and was a village arrangement widely employed throughout the southeast. The Coles Creek era Balmoral Mounds and early Plaquemine era Routh Mounds (occupied c. 1200 to 1350 CE) sites which features this same layout are also located on the western bank of Lake St Joseph near where the Taensa lived in the 17th century.

==== Chiefs residence ====
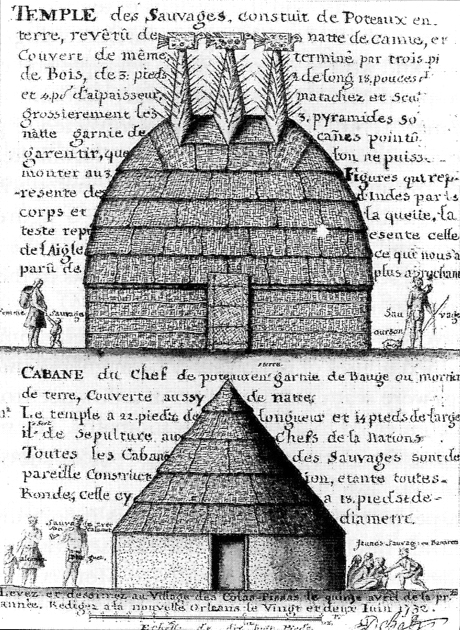
Great Temple and Great Suns cabin as drawn by Alexandre de Batz

The temple and chiefly residence stood on opposite sides of the plaza. The chiefs cabin was a square building measuring 40 feet (12 m) on each side with clay plastered walls 10 feet (3.0 m) high and 2 feet (0.61 m) thick. It was capped by a roof 15 feet (4.6 m) in height that was covered in cane mats woven so tightly they were said to be waterproof. The great temple was similar in appearance but had three carved eagle effigies at its summit. Inside beaten copper plaques and painting adorned the walls. There was a fire of burning cane in the center and low couch-like beds lined the walls. The chief sat on one that acted as a throne where he would hold court surrounded by his wives, retainers, and advisers who were all dressed in white garments woven from mulberry bark. Included among the advisors were the lesser chiefs, headmen, and councillors who oversaw the other villages.

==== Great Temple ====
The Taensa temple compares with similar descriptions recorded by artist Alexandre de Batz of the main temple at the contemporaneous Grand Village of the Natchez. Like the Natchez temple, it was situated on a low platform mound flanking the plaza., but unlike the Natchez temple it was surrounded with a palisade of sharpened stakes decorated with human skulls taken during wars with their enemies. Inside the palisade was a large dome-shaped structure over 100 feet (30 m) in circumference. At the peak of the roof were three red, yellow, and white painted wooden eagle effigies. The bird carvings faced east toward the rising sun. Woven cane mats covered the structure's outer walls and roof, and the temple was painted red. A guardian lived in a small shed that stood near the door.

Chroniclers describe the inside of the temple as having shelves holding oval-shaped split-cane baskets that were beautifully woven and painted. Inside were interred the bones of their chiefs and other honored dead, human and animal forms carved in stone, wood, and modeled as ceramic figurines, stuffed owls, jawbones of large fish, "heads and tails of extraordinary serpents", pieces of quartz crystal, and some European glass objects. There was also an altar decorated with a rope of human scalplocks. A ceremonial eternal fire representing the Sun was kept burning inside the building using an arrangement of three large hickory logs that were kept at a low burn and only slowly pushed into the fire. It was tended and guarded by two priests and other attendants who had a duty to make sure it was never extinguished. Except for the immediate relatives of the chief, all women and commoners were forbidden to enter the temple. Food offerings for their gods and the honored dead were frequently brought to the temple.

=== Religion ===
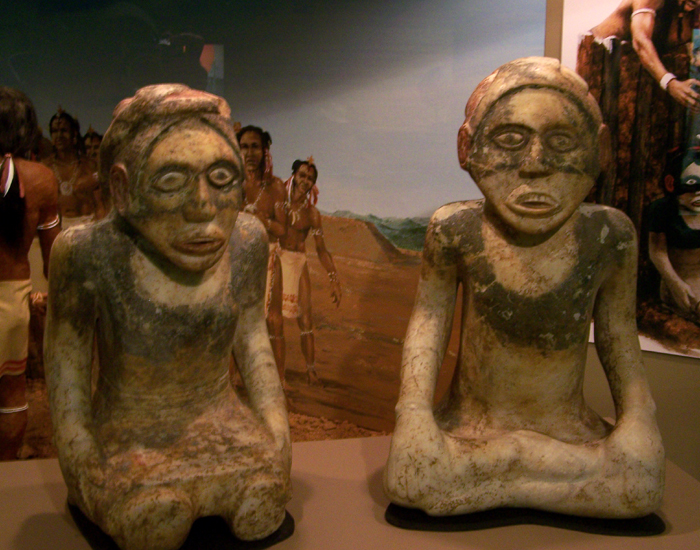
Mississippian "ancestral couple" statues from the Etowah site in Georgia

Taensa religious life revolved around the worship of the sun, represented by the sacred fire kept perpetually burning inside their temple. Their elite class of hereditary royalty were known as suns and like the Natchez they believed their chief, whose official name was Yak-stalchil (Great Sun), was matrilineally descended from the sun through his mother the "Grande Soleille" (French for "female Great Sun"). Their mythology claimed that in the distant past a man and woman who shone like the sun had come down to them to be their rulers. Afterwards they turned to stone. Stone statues fitting this description are recorded by early observers as being worshiped as the original couple in the temple. The Taensa rulers claimed descent from this mythological couple, making their social order in effect a solar theocracy. The eldest daughter of the female Great Sun inherited her mothers position. Her eldest son inherited the position and name of Yak-stalchil. Her second eldest son inherited the position of War Chief along with the name and title of Obalalkabiche (Tattooed Serpent).

Similar Mississippian stone temple statues to the ones described have been found in northern Georgia, the Tennessee River Valley area around Nashville, Tennessee, and on into western Tennessee and Kentucky, and southern Indiana and Illinois. Examples of this style are also known from wooden and ceramic versions. And although there is no direct waterway connecting the Tennessee-Cumberland region where these statues are most common, the Natchez Bluffs area was connected to the Nashville Basin in ancient times by the Natchez Trace, a pre-European native trade route. No stone statues have been found at Taensa archaeological sites, but two examples have been found at the Grand Village of the Natchez. The first was discovered in 1820 and the second in excavations into Mound C in 1930.

==== Mortuary traditions ====
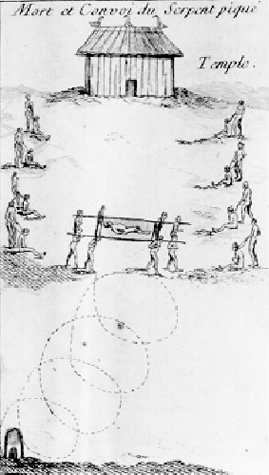
Funeral procession of the Natchez Obalalkabiche (Tattooed Serpent) with retainers waiting to be sacrificed

Upon the death of high-ranking individuals, the Taensa practiced ritual human sacrifice of retainers to accompany them as servants in the afterlife. An early chronicler, Henri de Tonti, wrote that when their Great Chief died, "They sacrifice his youngest wife, his house steward, and a hundred men to accompany him in the other world." This high number is thought to be exaggerated compared to other known sacrificial deaths at similar rituals among the Natchez, which were recorded by other observers.

French missionary François de Montigny reported that after the death of a chief, twelve victims were killed to accompany him. They were sacrificed by having their heads broken, and there would have been more victims without the French intervention. During his conversions and baptisms, de Montigny implored the Taensa to discontinue the practice. A few months later in the spring of 1700 the Taensa temple was struck by lightning. The Taensa priest immediately blamed its destruction on the French priest, because he had persuaded them to suspend their ancestral customs. After exhortations from the native priest, five women threw their children onto the flames of the burning temple as sacrificial victims. Great honor was associated with such a sacrifice, and the women were held in high esteem. After the sacrifice they were clothed in special white garments made of mulberry bark thread usually reserved for the nobility and had a white feather placed on their heads. They then were led in a procession to the chief's house, which was in the process of being converted into the new temple. People gave them gifts and there were eight days of ceremonies to honor them.

Taensa mortuary traditions for the elites was to first bury the deceased and at a later date exhume and burn the body. The defleshed bones were then collected into a bundle and placed in a split cane basket which would then reside in the temple which also acted as a mortuary house.

== Language ==
Early chroniclers de Montigny, Saint-Cosme, and Antoine-Simon Le Page du Pratz described the Taensa language as being nearly identical with the Natchez language; the missionaries were learning the latter language in their efforts to convert the Natchez and Taensa to Christianity.

Linguists consider the Natchezan language family to be a language isolate. The best known connection proposed between Natchezan languages and other languages is Mary Haas' Gulf hypothesis, in which she conceived of a macrofamily comprising Muskogean and several language isolates of the southeastern US: Atakapa, Chitimacha, Natchez/Taensa, and Tunica. This hypothesis is now generally rejected by historical linguists, but some Muskogean scholars continue to believe that Muskogean is related to Natchez.

=== Taensa language hoax ===
Between 1880 and 1882, a young clerical student in Paris named Jean Parisot published what was purported to be "material of the Taensa language, including papers, songs, a grammar and vocabulary"; this generated considerable interest among philologists. There was doubt about this material for many years; noted American anthropologist and linguist John R. Swanton conclusively proved the work to be a hoax in a series of publications in 1908-1910.

== See also ==
- History of the Tunica people
- Tunica-Biloxi
