= Avoyel =

Native American tribe in Louisiana

Total population
- extinct as a tribe, merged into Tunica-Biloxi (unknown) unknown (including those of ancestral descent)
- 1698: 280
- 1805: 2-3

Regions with significant populations
- Louisiana

Languages
- Avoyel language, Mobilian trade jargon

Religion
- Indigenous religion

The Avoyel or Avoyelles were a small Native American tribe who at the time of European contact inhabited land near the mouth of the Red River at its confluence with the Atchafalaya River near present-day Marksville, Louisiana. Today, the Avoyel are a member of the federally recognized Native American tribe and sovereign nation of the Tunica Biloxi Tribe of Louisiana.

The U.S. Department of the Interior determined that: "The contemporary Tunica-Biloxi Indian Tribe is the successor of the historical Tunica, Ofo, and Avoyel tribes, and part of the Biloxi tribe. These have a documented existence back to 1698. The component tribes were allied in the 18th century and became amalgamated into one in the 19th century through common interests and outside pressures from non-Indian cultures."

== Name ==
Also called variously Shi'xkaltī'ni (Stone-Arrow-Point people) in Tunican and Tassenocogoula, Tassenogoula, Toux Enongogoula, and Tasånåk Okla in the Mobilian trade language; all names (including the autonym Avoyel) are said by early French chroniclers to mean either "Flint People" or "People of the Rocks". This is thought to either reflect their active trading of flint for tools from local sources on their land in the eponymously named modern Avoyelles Parish or more likely as their status as middlemen in trading flint from Caddoan peoples to their north to the stone deficit Atakapa and Chitimacha peoples of the Gulf Coast.

French explorer Pierre Le Moyne d'Iberville misleadingly called the Avoyel petits Taensas in 1699. However, they are a different group than the Natchez–speaking Taensa, whom the French called the grand Taensas.

== Language ==
Avoyel
- Avoyel
- (unattested)
- Native to: United States
- Region: Louisiana
- Ethnicity: Avoyel
- Extinct: 1810s
- Language family: unclassified (Natchez? Caddoan?)

Language codes
- ISO 639-3: None (mis)
- Linguist List: 076
- Glottolog: None
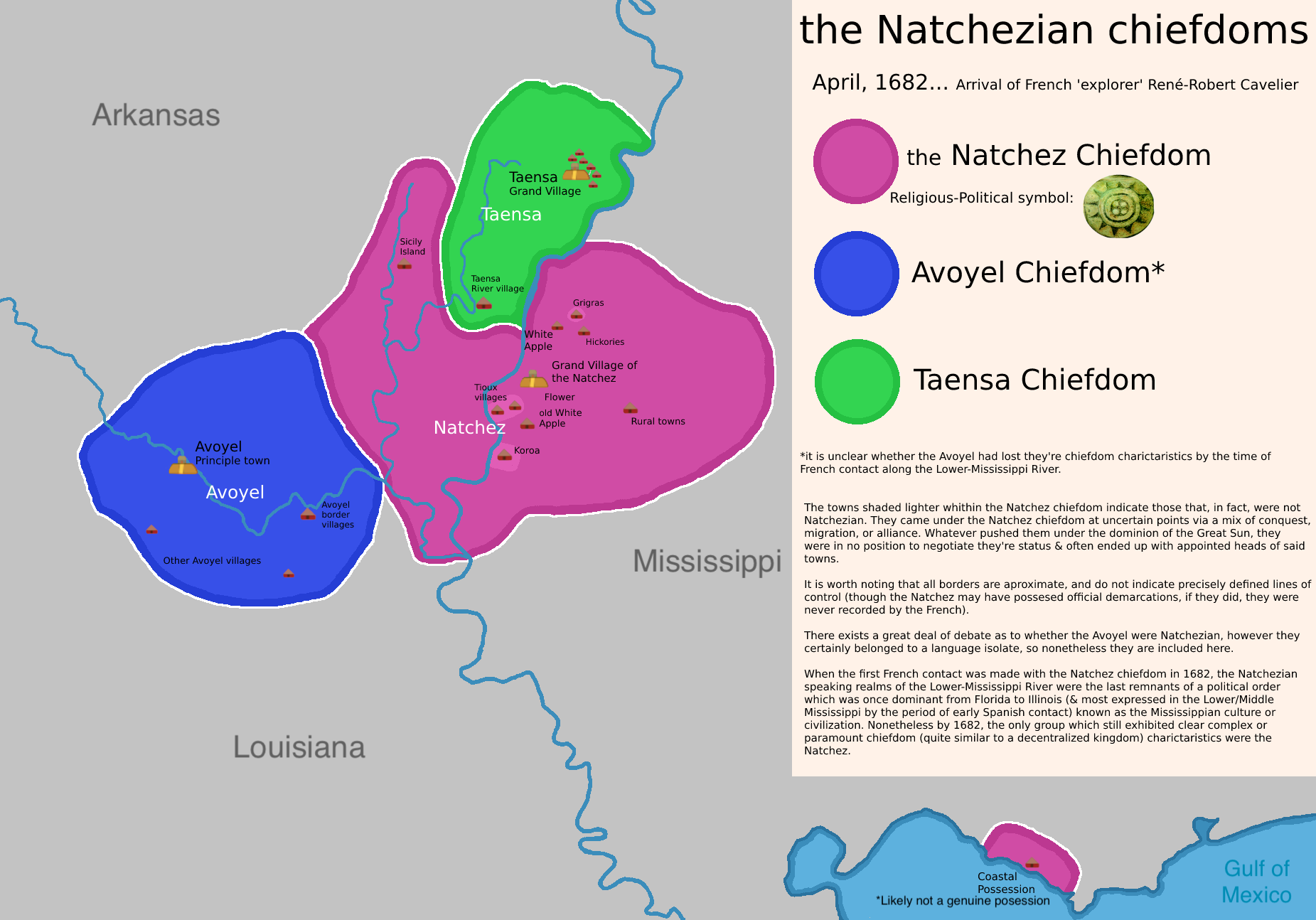
- Avoyel

The Avoyel language may have been related to the Natchez language.

Described by some historians as being a Caddoan group, and by others as a Natchez-speaking group of Mary Haas' Gulf hypothesis along with the Natchez and Taensa; their true linguistic and ethnic affiliation is somewhat uncertain because no written or spoken version of their language has survived.

== History ==
=== 17th century ===
At the time of European contact, the Avoyel lived in several villages on the Red River in locations near present-day Alexandria and a palisaded village near Marksville. They controlled the river to its confluence with the lower Black River, Upper Atchafalaya River and the Mississippi.

Never numerous, the Avoyel numbered 280 in 1698, according to French records. Their population declined markedly after that. The Avoyel likely experienced the same drastic decimation as Native American tribes, primarily due to newly introduced European infectious diseases to which they had no acquired immunity.

=== 18th century ===
The Avoyel survivors were believed to have been absorbed by marriage into the neighboring Tunica, Ofo, and Biloxi peoples who had moved to the area sometime in the late 1780s or 1790s because of encroachment by Euro-Americans at their previous locations.

=== 19th century ===
Indian Agent John Sibley wrote in 1805 that the only surviving Avoyel were two or three women living along the Washita River.

== Descendants ==
Since the 19th century, descendants of the Avoyel people have been part of the Tunica-Biloxi.

In 1908, John Swanton met a Tunica man whose grandmother was Avoyel and recorded the Tunica term Shi’xkalti’ni meaning ‘stone-arrow-point people’ for the Avoyel, although the man knew little about them. In the 1970s, some Tunica-Biloxi still identified as having Avoyel ancestry.
