= Horace Pierite =

Native American leader

Chief of the Tunica-Biloxi Tribe
- In office 1943–1955

Personal details
- Born: 1883 Avoyelles Parish, Louisiana, U.S.
- Died: May 15, 1955 (aged 72) Marksville, Louisiana

Horace Pierite Sr. (1883 − May 15, 1955) was an American politician, farmer, trapper, and Native American leader.

== Background ==
Horace Pierite was born in 1883. He grew up on the Tunica-Biloxi Indian reservation, in Marksville, Louisiana, where he lived throughout his life.

== Tribal leadership ==
Horace was elected Chief of the Tunica-Biloxi tribe of Louisiana and served until his death. Previously, Horace served as sub-chief under Chief Eli Barbry.

== Tribal recognition ==
On September 12, 1938, Eli Barbry and Sam Barbry (Tunica), Clarence Jackson (Choctaw), and Horace Pierite (Biloxi), traveled to Washington and called on Fred H. Daiker, an assistant of John Collier the Commissioner of Indian Affairs. At the meeting, they reported the allegation about the illegal land claims against their Spanish land grants in Avoyelles Parish. Daiker and Collier denied their claims based on a prior report from John Sibley that stated there were only a few Tunica and Avoyel Indians and that they were "dying out". Collier believed the tribe was extinct.

Not until 1949, did the Bureau of Indian Affairs officially again meet with the Tunicas. In February 1949, Chief Horace and sub-chief Joseph Pierite twice discussed the possibility of Federal aid with A. H. McMullen, the Superintendent at the Philadelphia, Mississippi Choctaw Agency. McMullen declined to take a position. As a result, much of the Tunica-Biloxi land was seized by local white farmers. The Avoyelles Parish government awarded the white farmers with deeds to the Indian land.

The Tunicas were unable to obtain either attention or services. Not until the 1970s did they actively resume their attempts to gain recognition. Toward this end, the Tunica-Biloxi Tribe of Indians of Louisiana was incorporated on October 26, 1974. The organizers were Joseph Pierite Jr., Horace Pierite Jr., Sam Barbry Jr., and Rose Marie Gallardo. The articles and by-laws were approved by an election on October 26, 1974. Joseph Pierite became the chairman and registered agent. Louisiana state recognition was achieved in 1975. In 1981, the Tunica Biloxi tribe received federal recognition from the United States Government.

== Legacy ==
He and his wife had one daughter, Carry Pierite Barbry, and two sons, Finelin Pierite and Horace Pierite Jr.

== See also ==
- Earl Barbry
- Sesostrie Youchigant
