= Atakapa language =

Extinct language of southern United States

Atakapa
- Ishakkoy, Yukhiti Kóy
- Native to: United States
- Region: Louisiana, Texas
- Ethnicity: Atakapa
- Extinct: early 20th century
- Revival: late 2010s
- Language family: Language isolate
- Dialects: Western; Eastern

Language codes
- ISO 639-3: aqp
- Glottolog: atak1252
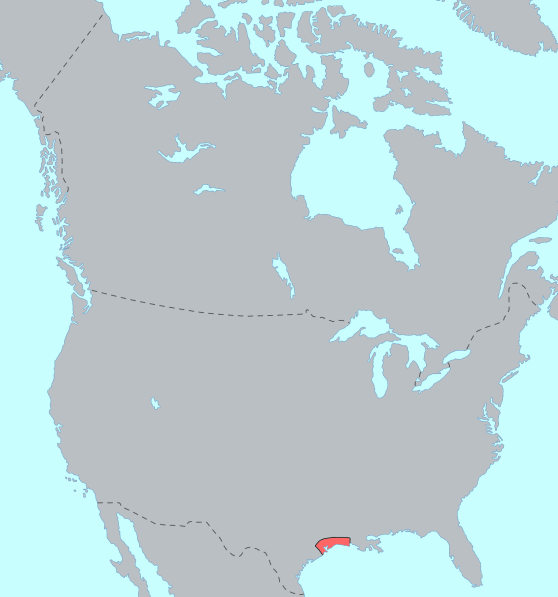
- Pre-contact distribution of the Atakapa language

Atakapa (/əˈtækəpə, -pɑː/, natively Ishakkoy) is an extinct language isolate native to southwestern Louisiana and nearby coastal eastern Texas. It was spoken by the Atakapa people (also known as Ishak, after their word for "the people"). The language became extinct in the early 20th century.

== Classification ==
While considered an isolate, there have been attempts to connect Atakapa with other languages of the Southeast. In 1919 John R. Swanton proposed a Tunican language family that would include Atakapa, Tunica, and Chitimacha; Morris Swadesh would later provide work focusing on connections between Atakapa and Chitimacha. Mary Haas later expanded the proposal by adding Natchez and the Muskogean languages, a hypothesis known as Gulf. These proposed families have not been proven. The similarities between Atakapa and Chitimacha, at least, may be attributable to periods of "intense contact [between speakers of the two languages] owing to their geographic proximity."

== Dialects ==
According to Swanton (1929) and Goddard (1996), Atakapa could be classified into Eastern and Western varieties. Eastern Atakapa is known from a French-Atakapa glossary with 287 entries, compiled in 1802 by Martin Duralde. The speakers interviewed by Duralde lived in the easternmost part of Atakapa territory, around Poste des Attakapas (now Saint Martinville).

Western Atakapa is the better-attested of the two varieties. In 1885, Albert Gatschet collected words, sentences, and texts from two native Atakapa speakers, Louison Huntington and Delilah Moss at Lake Charles, Louisiana. John R. Swanton worked with another two speakers near Lake Charles: Teet Verdine in 1907, and Armojean Reon in 1908. Additionally, in 1721, Jean Béranger collected a small vocabulary from captive speakers in Galveston Bay. John Swanton argued that the Béranger vocabulary represented the Akokisa language, spoken by a people who lived somewhat inland from Galveston Bay. There is little evidence to support his assertion.

== Phonology ==
=== Vowels ===
Atakapa has five vowels as presented in Swadesh (1946). Vowel length is contrastive in Atakapa.

	Front	Central	Back
Close	i		u
Mid	e		o
Open		a	

=== Consonants ===
According to Swadesh (1946), Atakapa has the consonants presented in the following chart.

	Labial	Dental	Alveolar	Palatal	Velar	Glottal
Nasal	m		n		ŋ	
Plosive	p	t	ts ⟨c⟩		k	
Fricative			ɬ ⟨ł⟩	ʃ ⟨š⟩		h
Approximant	w		l	j ⟨y⟩		

Underlying /ŋ/ surfaces as [k] when it appears at the end of a syllable. Swadesh further notes that /m/ often surfaces as [n] or [ŋ] word-finally in some adjectives, but "irregular variations in [Gatschet's] writing" preclude him from settling on any further conditions for this. Additionally, it is unclear whether /n/ is indeed a distinct phoneme from /ŋ/; if this is the case, argues Swadesh, then words containing final /n/ must have arrived in a later period.

Consonant clusters consisting of a stop followed by a sibilant—themselves arising from vowel epenthesis—are generally contracted to /c/. For example, kec-k ("liver") arose from *keks, which arose from epenthesis and final-vowel deletion processes in *kekesi, which itself is the reduplicated form of *kesi. However, there are words in which the suffix -kš appears, suggesting that this contraction rule ran its course in an earlier period.

=== Syllable structure and stress ===
The typical Atakapa syllable is of the structure CVC. Swanton (1929) observes that clusters of more than two consonants are rare in the language. From his analysis of Gatschet's data, he concludes that consonant clusters of any size are not permitted in the syllable onset, but that they are permitted in the coda.

Stress is "a purely mechanical function of phrase rhythm" in Atakapa; it is generally the final syllable of a phrase that receives stress.

== Morphology ==
The Atakapa language is a mostly agglutinative, somewhat polysynthetic language of the templatic type. This meaning that the language stacks (primarily within the verbal complex) a number of affixes to express locatives, tense, aspect, modality, valency adjustment, and person/number (as both subject and object), which are assembled in a rather specific order. Person marking is one of the only instances of fusion within the language, fusing both person and number. Nouns have only a handful of suffixes and usually take only one suffix at a time.

The language is largely head-marking; however, reduplication of an adjectival stem tends to show dependent-marking, as it often expresses the plurality of the noun it describes.

1. shāk tōl "good man"
2. shāk tōltōl "good men"

=== Pronominal morphology ===
Object pronouns are prefixed to verbs, while subject pronouns are suffixed. There are independent forms of each pronoun as well: in the first person singular and plural, this form appears to be distinct from either affix, but in the second and third persons, the affixes seem to be related to the independent forms.

Grammatical gender appears not to occur in Atakapa, though evidence for it in nearby languages (e.g. Chitimacha) has been found.

The following table of pronominal forms is presented in Swanton (1919).

Number	Person	Independent	Objective	Subjective
Singular	1	wi	hi-	-ō
Singular	2	na	na-, n-	
Singular	3	ha	ha-	
Singular	Indefinite		hi-	
Plural	1	yūkit	ic-	-tse
Plural	2	nakit	nak-	-tem
Plural	3	hakit	hak-	-ūl, -ti (with intransitives)

In addition, Swanton notes the existence of a reflexive prefix hat- and a reciprocal prefix hak-. However, the reflexive form may be a circumfix rather than a prefix: Kaufman cites the example of hat-yul-šo ("paint themselves"), in which both hat- and -šo indicate reflexivity.

=== Nominal morphology ===
There are multiple ways to indicate a noun's plurality in Atakapa:

1. attachment to the noun of the suffix -heu ("many")
2. attachment to the noun of the prefix -šak (to indicate an indefinite plural)
3. reduplication of the accompanying adjective
4. employment of the plural suffix in the accompanying adjective and/or verb

According to Swanton (1919), a noun-forming affix -nen or -nan exists in Atakapa.

=== Verbal morphology ===
The full order of morphemes within the verb complex is:

1. Objective pronominal prefix
2. Locative prefixes (if applicable)
3. Verb stem
4. Plural suffix -m or usitative suffix -u (if applicable)
5. Infinitive or emphatic suffix -c (if applicable)
6. Future suffix -ti (if applicable)
7. Aspectual suffixes: continuative -k, intentional -n, etc. (if applicable)
8. Assertive suffix: -š (if applicable)
9. Subjective pronominal suffix
10. Tense suffixes: past perfective -at, past imperfective -hinst (if applicable)
11. Negative (if applicable)

It is unclear whether or not a distinct class of auxiliary verbs exists in Atakapa; the difference between a stem-plus-auxiliary construction and a two-verb-serialization construction is not well marked.

Additionally, there is no mention of the assertive suffix -š in Swanton's work; Kaufman (2014) derives it by analogizing Atakapa and Chitimacha.

==== Verb serialization ====
Verb serialization is a productive process in Atakapa.

1. pam-nima (lit. "beat-die"): beat to death.
2. ta-wat-ten (lit. "stand-come-talk"): pray.

== Syntax ==
Atakapa exhibits strict subject-object-verb word order. While verbs are typically found in sentence-final position, it is common for adjuncts, or even subordinate clauses, to follow the verb of the principal clause. The suffixes -ne and -n are used to indicate the subordination of a clause to the main clause, as in tsanuk micat penene ("she gave a horse [for curing her]").

With occasional exceptions, adjectives follow the nouns they describe. Adverbs follow nouns and adjectives, but precede verbs.

=== Case marking ===
Atakapa marks only the locative case. The language has four locative suffixes, in addition to a series of locative postpositions. These suffixes and postpositions may be placed after nouns, adjectives, and demonstratives.

- -kin, the most frequently-occurring suffix, expresses the sense of English "in" or "on", as in nun-kin tōhulāt ("they lived in villages").
  - -ki (occasionally -ke) occurs in similar contexts.
- -ip corresponds roughly to English "at", and is very commonly used with nē, "down", to form nēp, "below".
- -ik generally parallels English "with", as in hatyūlcō nōhik ("they painted themselves with red").

=== Noun incorporation ===
Swanton (1919) asserts that noun incorporation is present in Atakapa, but he provides no examples of this.

=== Deixis ===
Three demonstratives serve as deictics in Atakapa:

1. ha or a, "this"—co-present with the speaker.
2. ya, distant from the speaker.
3. ma, still more distant from the speaker.

== Bibliography ==
- Campbell, Lyle. (1997). American Indian languages: The historical linguistics of Native America. New York: Oxford University Press. ISBN 0-19-509427-1.
- Gatschet, Albert S., and Swanton, John R. (1932) A Dictionary of the Atakapa Language. Smithsonian Institution, Bureau of American Athnology, bulletin 108. Washington, DC: Government Printing Office.
- Goddard, Ives (2005). "The indigenous languages of the Southeast". Anthropological Linguistics. 47 (1): 1–60. JSTOR 25132315.
- Hopkins, Nicholas A. (2007). The Native Languages of the Southeastern United States. Los Angeles: Foundation for the Advancement of Mesoamerican Studies, Inc. (FAMSI), pp. 23–24. Abstract. Full text online.
- Mithun, Marianne. (1999). The languages of Native North America. Cambridge: Cambridge University Press. ISBN 0-521-23228-7 (hbk); ISBN 0-521-29875-X.
- Swadesh, Morris (1946). "Phonologic Formulas for Atakapa-Chitimacha". International Journal of American Linguistics. 12 (3): 113–132. doi:10.1086/463901. S2CID 144473306.
- Swanton, John R (1929). "A sketch of the Atakapa language". International Journal of American Linguistics. 5 (2–4): 121–149. doi:10.1086/463777. JSTOR 1263302. S2CID 143735208.
