= Sesostrie Youchigant =

Last known native speaker of the Tunica language

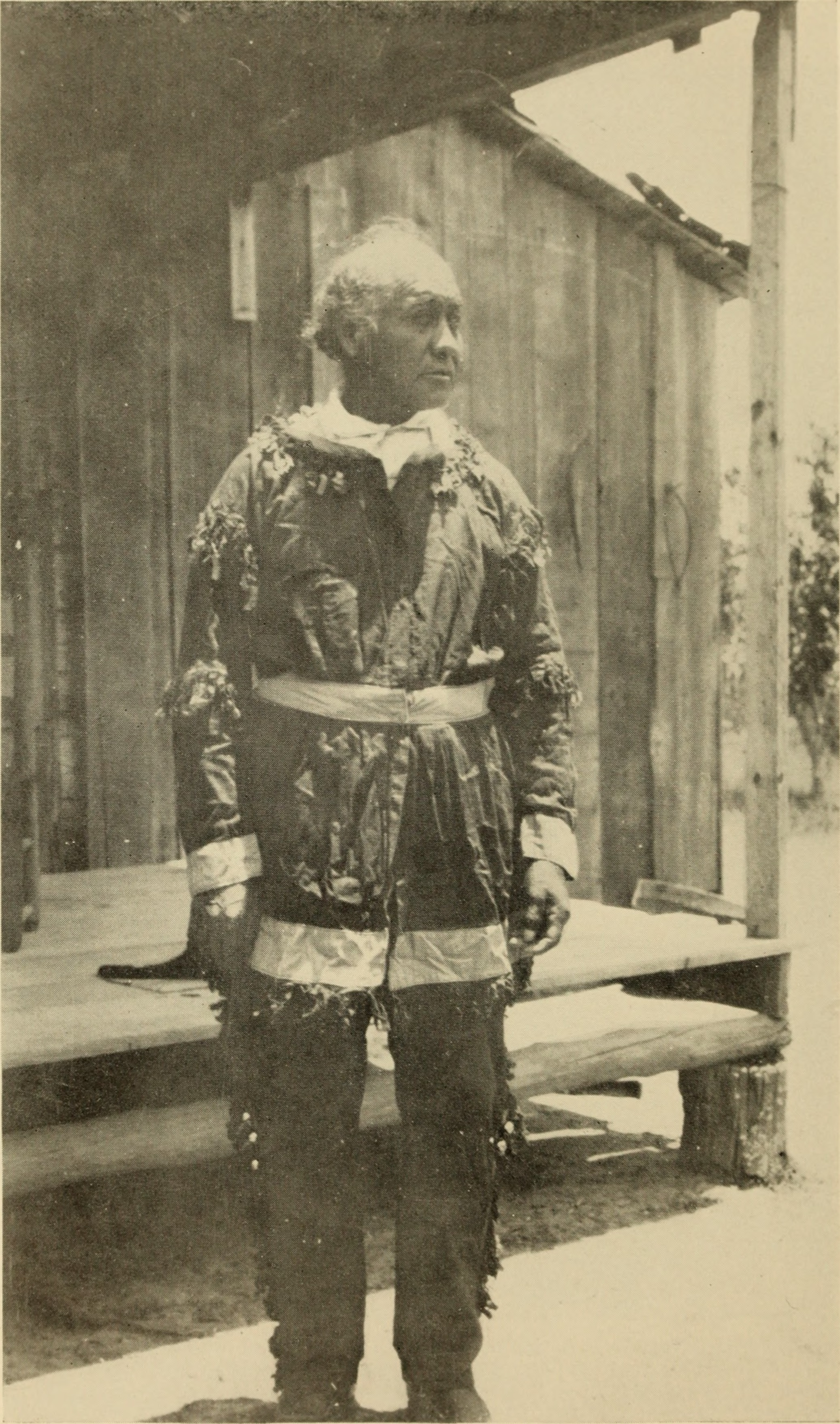
- Youchigant in 1901
- Born: c. 1870
- Died: December 6, 1948 (aged 77–78)
- Other name: Sam Young
- Occupation: tribal leader
- Known for: last speaker of Tunica language
- Term: 1911–1921
- Successor: Ernest Pierite

Sesostrie Youchigant, also known as Sam Young (c. 1870 – December 6, 1948), was a chief of the Tunica-Biloxi tribe and the last known native speaker of the Tunica language.

== Political leadership ==
Sesostrie Youchigant (center). As Chief of the Tunica-Biloxi, photographed in 1915.

Youchigant was elected chief by the Tunica in 1911. The tribe kept records of its elections in the parish courthouse. He served until 1921, when he resigned. Ernest Pierite succeeded him as chief, with Youchigant's half-brother, Eli Barbry, elected as subchief.

== Language advocacy ==
He worked with linguist Mary Haas in 1933 (and during four subsequent visits between 1933 and 1938) to describe what he remembered of the language, which he had learned as a child. He also recounted oral history of his tribe's migrations and their diplomatic relationships with other tribes.

When Haas contacted him, he had not had anyone to talk to in Tunica for nearly 20 years, and was the only individual left who spoke it "with any degree of fluency". Youchigant also spoke Louisiana French as his first language, in addition to English. Haas's 1935 doctoral dissertation, A Grammar of the Tunica Language, was a result of this collaboration. Haas's Tunica Texts (1950) and much of Tunica Dictionary (1953) are also based on her work with Youchigant.

== See also ==
- Horace Pierite
- Earl Barbry
