= Tunica language =

Extinct language isolate of the Mississippi Valley

Tunica
- Tonica, Yuron
- Luhchi Yoroni
- Native to: United States
- Region: Central Louisiana
- Ethnicity: Tunica people
- Extinct: December 6, 1948, with the death of Sesostrie Youchigant
- Revival: 60 L2 speakers (2023)
- Language family: Language isolate

Language codes
- ISO 639-3: tun
- Glottolog: tuni1252
- ELP: Tunica
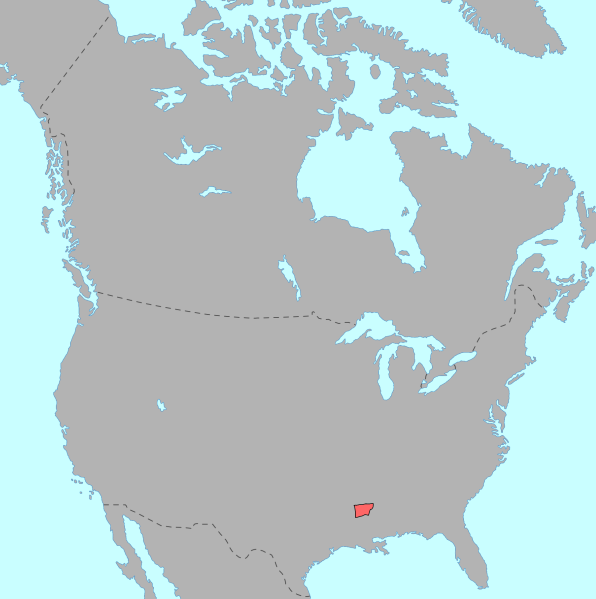
- Pre-contact distribution of the Tunica language

Tunica or Luhchi Yoroni (also Tonica, or less common form Yuron) is a language isolate that was spoken in the Central and Lower Mississippi Valley in the United States by Native American Tunica peoples. There are no native speakers of the Tunica language, but there were 32 second-language speakers in 2017, and as of 2023, there are 60 second-language speakers.

Tunica-Biloxi tribal member William Ely Johnson worked with Swiss ethnologist Albert Gatschet to help him document the language in 1886. This initial documentation was further developed by linguist John R. Swanton in the early 1900s.

The last known native speaker, Sesostrie Youchigant, died in 1948. In the 1930s, linguist Mary Haas worked with him to describe what Youchigant remembered of the language, and the description was published in A Grammar of the Tunica Language in 1941. That was followed by Tunica Texts in 1950 and Tunica Dictionary in 1953.

By the 17th century, the people had suffered a high rate of fatalities from Eurasian infectious diseases, warfare, and social disruption. The reduced Tunica tribe lived close to the Ofo and Avoyelles tribes, in present-day Louisiana. They communicated by Mobilian Jargon or French. The small population and the use of a jargon made Haas note that the eventual deterioration of the Tunica language was inevitable.

== Classification ==
Although Tunica is usually classified as a language isolate, Granberry (1994) suggested that Tunica was related to Calusa (Calusa–Tunica family), with Calusa possibly being relatively a recent arrival from the lower Mississippi region. Another possibility was that similarities between the languages were derived from long-term mutual contact. It can also be related to Gulf languges.

== Language revitalization efforts ==
In 2010, the Tunica-Biloxi tribe formed the Tunica Language Project in partnership with the Linguistics Program at Tulane University in a continuing effort to revitalize the Tunica language. Tribal members read from a new children's book in Tunica at a 2010 pow wow. Only about half of the tribal members live within 75 miles (121 km) of the reservation, in Avoyelles Parish. The Tunica-Biloxi Language & Culture Revitalization Program uses webinars to teach the language to those who do not live near the reservation.

== Phonology ==
The phonology of Tunica is as follows.

=== Vowels ===
Tunica has seven vowels, all of which are usually short but may be lengthened in stressed syllables, and all of which are voiced completely, except if a /u/ is at the end of a phrase in a word with stress on the second-last syllable, when it is unvoiced after a /k/ or /hk/. Vowels are paired with a certain melody in last or occasionally second-last syllable of a word. The melodies are high, low, rising, falling, and falling-rising.

	Front	Central	Back
Close	i		u
Close-mid	e		o
Open-mid	ɛ		ɔ
Open		a	

Vowels may appear only following or preceding consonants, never adjacent to one another. Also, /i/, /a/, and /u/ may appear in any position, but the others appear only in syllables with stress. Vowels do not typically occur at the end of a phrase, and when any vowel precedes n in the same syllable, it becomes nasalized.

=== Consonants ===
The transcription style (represented in bolded symbols below) is based on Mary Haas' work Tunica Language. The IPA symbols are in brackets next to each consonant.

		Labial	Alveolar	Palatal	Velar	Glottal
Plosive	voiceless	p [p]	t [t̻]	č [t͡ʃ]	k [k]	ʔ [ʔ]
Plosive	voiced	b [b]	d [d]		g [ɡ]	
Fricative		f [f]	s [s]	š [ʃ]		h [h]
Nasal		m [m]	n [n]			
Trill			r [r]			
Approximant		w [w]	l [l]	y [j]		

The consonants /p/, /t/, /k/, and /t͡ʃ/ are always fairly aspirated unless they occur before a /ʔ/, when they are completely unaspirated. Meanwhile, /b/, /d/, and /g/ do not occur frequently, as is the case with /f/. The fricatives /s/ and /š/ are pronounced with a stronger hiss than in English, and /ʔ/ is said to have a very strong closure. The semi-vowels /j/ and /w/ are always voiced, as is the nasal /m/. On the other hand, /n/, /l/, and /r/ can be voiced or voiceless. The /l/ and /r/ are voiced between vowels or before /ʔ/ or continuants. However, they are voiceless before voiceless consonants except /ʔ/ or at the end of a phrase: ši'lka "blackbird," ši'hkal "stone." Similarly, /n/ is voiced between vowels or before /ʔ/ and is voiceless at the end of a phrase or before voiceless consonants except /ʔ/.

=== Prosody ===
Tunica has both stressed and unstressed syllables, and stressed syllables can have a higher pitch than other syllables, depending on the position of the syllable in a phrase. The first stressed syllable of a phrase is typically spoken with a slightly higher pitch than the following syllables are. The exception is the last syllable when the high or the falling melody is used or the last syllable during the use of the low or the rising melody. The phrase-final melody then determines much of the stress in the rest of the phrase.

When there is use of the high melody, the last syllable is about a minor third higher pitch than the second-last syllable. The first syllable with stress is usually a major second higher than the following syllables are except for the last. All other syllables may not be spoken with any kind of pitch, and the same goes for other unstressed syllables. For example, ta'čiyak ʔura'pʔikʔahčá "You will kill the squirrel" shows the melody. ta'- is a major second higher than the syllables that follow it except for -ča, which is a minor third higher than any syllable that comes before it other than ta'-.

The falling melody causes the last syllable to start at a minor third higher than the second-last syllable: it goes down quickly: ʔa'hkiš ma'rʔikî "Go back!"

The low melody that occurs as the last syllable is lower than the last stressed syllable, which is a little higher than the syllables that it immediately follows. All unstressed syllables between the last stressed syllable and the last syllable take on the same stress as the latter. Unless it is also the last stressed syllable, the first stressed syllable is higher than any following syllable except that last stressed syllable: ʔu'riš ma'rʔuwa'nì "He went back home, they say."

When the rising melody occurs, the last syllable starts lower than the last stressed syllable and goes upward quickly by about a minor third. Elsewhere in the phrase, the tone is like a low melody: lɔ'ta wiwa'nǎn "Do you want to run?"

The falling-rising melody is a fast drop by a fourth, followed by a fast rise by a minor third. However, only one word uses it: hőn "Yes."

=== Phonological processes ===
Every syllable in Tunica begins with a single consonant. Sometimes, double or triple consonants may occur in the middle of words or phrases, but no more than two consonants in a row occur at the end of a phrase. The smallest phonetic group in Tunica is a phrase, but a word and a phrase can be differentiated by certain processes. Those that affect grammatical elements that merge to form words are vocalic contraction, vocalic assimilation, vocalic syncope, consonantic syncope, haplology, and patterns in stress. Those that affect words that combine into phrases are vocalic apocope, consonantic apocope, amalgamation, and stress losses. More specific information and basic examples are detailed below:

- /a/ assimilates after /i/ or /e/ > /ɛ/, and /a/ assimilates after /o/ or /u/ > /ɔ/: mi'lʔɛhɛ "not red" < mi'li "red" + -ʔaha "not."
- When the first vowel of aha or ehe contracts or assimilates with the preceding vowel, the second vowel takes on the same quality as the first: ka'šʔɛhɛ "not true" < ka'ši "true" + -ʔaha "not."
- In combining grammatical elements into words, a vowel preceding /ʔ/ is syncopated (lost) unless at the end of a monosyllabic stem or prefix: la'pʔɔhɔ "not good" < la'pu "good" + -ʔaha "not."
- /h/ between a continuant and a voiceless stop is dropped in consonantic syncope; /k/ between /h/ and a voiceless stop is dropped; /hk/ before a continuant aside from /h/ is dropped; /š/ before another/š/ makes one of them drop; the prefix ta'- becomes t- before the stems beginning with /ʔ/, and /ʔ/ is syncopated.
- Haplology occurs when the last syllable of the preceding noun stem takes is /k/, followed by a vowel: the last syllable drops if the second noun member starts with /k/: ha'hkiri "cornmeal" < ha'hka "corn" + ki'ri "ground."
- All stems have an intrinsic stress, and some affixes have intrinsic stress on the first syllable. In the combination of elements to form words and phrases, the stresses are retained if possible, but two stressed syllables do not occur consecutively, which causes the need for certain accommodations. For example, monosyllabic or syncopated disyllabic stems, followed by another element with intrinsic stress, cause the latter to lose its stress. Also, a stem, combined with a stressed monosyllabic prefix, loses its stress.
- Vocalic apocope occurs before another word starting with /ʔ/ if the prior word does not have a stressed second-last syllable: tu'wak(u) ʔu'wakɔ'ni "the owl hooted," or, if it does, the following word does not contain a stressed first syllable: ʔu'w(i) ʔonɛni "he was a person."
- When a word is vocalically apocopated, with the sound lost at the end of the word, and ends in a consonant group of a continuant plus a voiceless stop, it then goes through consonantic apocope and so the word-final consonant is lost. A voiceless stop between /h/ and another voiceless stop is dropped. A voiceless stop after any continuant except /h/ is dropped. A consonant group of /h/ followed by a voiceless stop is dropped if a continuant follows.
- Amalgamations occur when words beginning with /h/ lose it after a word that is vocalically apocopated: ta'hala'yiht "on the ground" < ta'hal(i) "the ground" + (h)a'yihta.
- If an irregularly-apocopated word with a stressed second-last syllable is placed before a word with stress on the first syllable, the first word loses its stress. If the second word does not have stress on the first syllable, the first word keeps the stressed syllable.

== Morphology ==
The morphology of Tunica is as follows.

=== Inflection ===
Nouns can be divided into the categories of indeterminative and determinative. The indeterminative nouns have a stem without any affixes, and the determinative nouns are distinguished by the articular prefix or the pronominal prefix. Determinative nouns are definitive, non-definitive, and locative, which may be distinguished by different prefixes or suffixes.

The articular prefix is similar to the definite article in English and appears as ta'- before all stems not beginning with /ʔ/ or /t/. The prefix appears as t- before stems beginning with /ʔ/, and it is omitted by haplology before stems beginning with /t/: te'tiha'yihta "on the road"; te'ti "the road" < te'ti "road"

All proper nouns, unless their stems begin with /t/, must begin with the articular prefix. For instance, ta'wišmi'li "Red River" is ta'- + wi'š(i)mi'li "red water".

The pronominal prefixes signify possession when they are attached to a noun and preclude the need for articular prefixes with the same stem. Some stems, called inalienably-possessed noun stems, cannot be used without a pronominal prefix. They include those of kinship, body parts, and miscellaneous terms. Kinship terms are those such as -e'si "father" or '-gači "mother." Body part terms are those such as -e'sini "head" or -e'neri "horns." Finally, miscellaneous terms can be nouns like -e'htiwa'hkuni "breechcloth" or -e'tisa "name."

Gender-number suffixes can be used only in the definitive case of the determinative category so whenever one is used, there must also be a determining prefix attached to the stem. Below is a table showing the gender-number suffixes:

	Singular	Dual	Plural
Masculine	-ku, -ku'hu	ʔu'nima	-sɛ'ma, -sɛm
Feminine	-hči, -hči'hi	-si'nima, -sin	

Sometimes, gender-number suffixes are put on an inflected verb form to convert it to a relative clause. It could be that a noun has the appropriate suffix, and the verb of the clause then takes the same one. Other times, only the verb takes the suffix. Examples of the use of the gender-number suffixes follow:

- ta'čɔhǎku, "the chief" < ta'- + čɔ'hǎ + -ku
- ti'sasi'nimǎn, "her dogs" < tihk + sa' + -si'nima
- to'nišisɛ'mǎn, "the men" < ta'- + ʔo'niši + sɛ'ma

Finally, there are three possible locative suffixes to put nouns in the locative case. The nouns will also have a determining prefix attached. Gender-number suffixes and locative suffixes are mutually exclusive, but a locative noun may have a number. Also, locative suffixes can take stems and convert them into adverbs and postpositions. -ši is the most commonly used locative suffix, and its meaning is comparable to the English "in, into" or "on, over," but in Tunica, it is used as "at, to." That can be seen in the sentence "He stayed at home," which breaks down into ʔu'riš ʔunanì < "at his house" ʔu'riš(i) < ʔuhk- + ri- "house" + ši. -štihki "toward, in the direction of" is the second suffix.

Usually, it is used with the names of directions: ta'sapʔaraštihk "to the west" < ta- +sa'pʔara "west" + -štihki. The final locative suffix is -hat "on, onto." It is typically used only with ta'hali "the ground." It can be seen in the sentence "He spat on the ground" as ta'haltǎn, ču'hʔuhkɛ'nì; ta'halta < ta'- + ha'l(i) "ground, land" + -hat.

== Syntax ==
The syntax of Tunica is as follows.

=== Sentence parts ===
The possible word classes that are found in Tunica include independent personal pronouns, nouns, interrogative-indefinite pronouns, quantificatives, postpositions, adjectives, comparatives, adverbs, auxiliary verbs, active verbs, static verbs, sentence connectives, and exclamatives and imitatives. Syntactic elements of a sentence are made up of words, phrases, or clauses acting in one of the following: predicative words, independent subjects, independent objects, subject or object modifiers, predicate modifiers, predicate complements, or sentence connectives. The syntactic elements can all be made into clauses that are either main or subordinate, and subordinate clauses can be dependent, complementary, relative, or adverbial.

There are three types of sentences that the Tunica language produces: simple, compound, and complex. Simple sentences must contain only one predicative word. Compound sentences have two or more main clauses. Complex sentences have a main clause and one or more of the different types of subordinate clauses that are mentioned above.

The following are brief descriptions of possible syntactic elements of a clause:

- The predicative word may be an independent personal pronoun, a noun, an interrogative-indefinite pronoun, and quantificative, an adjective, or a verb.
- The independent subject may be an independent personal pronoun, a noun, an interrogative-indefinite pronoun, or a quantificative.
- The independent object may be an independent personal pronoun, a noun, an interrogative-indefinite pronoun, or a quantificative.
- The subject or object modifiers may be quantificatives or relative clauses.
- The predicate modifier

may be words when used as adjectives, comparatives, adverbs, and locatives and may be phrases and clauses when it is adverbial.

- The predicate complement may be words or clauses.
- The sentence connective makes a basic conjunctive or contrastive relation between a sentence and the one before it.

There are other special constructions that also take place in certain specific environments. For example, quantificatives and nouns can be in apposition to other nouns that independent subjects or objects: ʔuhkʔo'nisɛ'mǎn, ho't ʔaku'hpanʔuhkɛ'nì "He assembled all (of) his people, it is said" < "he assembled, it is said, his people, all." Additionally, a possessive nexus can serve in the same syntactical functions that a noun can. For example, ta'čɔhak ʔu'rǐhč, hi'yuhɔ'nì "The chief's house was (made of) grass" (ta'čɔhaku "the chief", possessor noun, + ʔu'rihči "his house", alienably possessed noun, the combination serving as independent subject).

=== Syntactic order ===
There are certain rules that are observed to form sentences in the correct order:

- When a sentence connective is in a sentence, it precedes the other elements in that sentence.
- The predicative word of any type of clause is at the end of a clause.
- An independent subject is before all other syntactic elements, except the sentence connective.
- An independent object is immediately before the predicative word.
- An adjective is immediately after the noun that it modifies.
- A comparative is immediately after the word that it modifies.
- A postposition is always immediately after a substantive.
- Predicate modifiers that describe spatial location are immediately before or after the verb that they modify.
- Non-locative predicate modifiers have free order.
- A predicate complement is immediately before the predicative word that it complements.

There are also certain rules in the order of clauses:

- Main clauses are always at the end of a sentence, except if the clause both is complementary and complements or modifies the predicative word of the main clause.
- Dependent clauses are before the main clause.
- Complementary clauses take the form of a clause within a clause, and the larger clause is either a main or dependent clause.
- Relative clauses are after the substantive that they modify.
- Adverbial clauses may be directly before or after the verb that they modify.

=== Noun classification ===
Noun can belong to one of the following gender-number classes: masculine singular, feminine singular, masculine dual, feminine dual, masculine plural, or feminine plural. There are rules to help determine classification of nouns:

- Nouns that refer to human or non-human male animate objects/people in any number are masculine in gender, and those that refer to human or non-human female animate objects/people in any number are feminine in gender.
- Nouns that refer specifically to human male and female animates in any number are masculine.
- Nouns that refer to non-human male and female animates are masculine when in the dual number but feminine in collective and plural numbers.
- Nouns that refer to human animates with an unknown sex always seem to take the masculine gender.

Nouns in Tunica are also classified according to what position they take. There are three positions that are available and that encompass every noun in the Tunica language: horizontal, squatting, and vertical. Humans and four-legged non-humans can take any of the positions, but elongated non-human animates (like fish or snakes) always take the horizontal position. Smaller non-human animates, like frogs and birds, always take the squatting position.

Inanimates are always horizontal or vertical: abstract nouns are always horizontal, and inanimate objects that take an erect position, like trees, are vertical.

=== Preverbs and postfixes ===
The preverbs are often used with active verb predicative words:

- te- "about, all about"
- ki- "in, into"
- ho- "out, out of"
- ha- "up, down"

There are many postfixes, which express different meanings like certain tenses and negation. Sometimes, more than one postfix may be attached to one word, and each postfix has its own governing rules.

- -man "and," coordinates clauses
- -ʔama "and, together with," coordinates nouns
- -škan "although, but"
- -hč "when, after, as, while"
- -hčika'ši: similar to the English "so...that" but it may be more like "because so..."
- -a'ni: quotative
- -n: interrogative, imperative, or exhortative
- -ki: imperative
- -hčan: imperative but with force; similar to "must..."
- -tan: imperative
- -kʔahča: indicates the future
- -kʔi: sometimes seen as -ʔi; can be defined as "if"
- -pan "even if, even though, though"
- -k: future subjunctive
- -aha "not"
- -kʔaha "not," but builds habitual negation
- -ʔaha "not" but used with non-inchoative forms of static verbs and also with independent personal pronouns, nouns, and adjectives when they are predicative
- -pʔaha "no, not any"
- -štukʔɔhɔ "can't"
- -hat "on...-'s part"
- -pa "too, also, even"
- -nahku "like, resembling..."
- -tahki "only, nothing but..." can also be "...alone; by...-self"
- -štahahki "only...," used with numbers
- -tɛ'pan "every...," used with nouns that imply a length of time
- -ša "...-ish; almost, not quite, somewhat"
- -štʔɛ "very much"
- -što'hku "fairly, quite, a little bit"
- -le'he "right, precisely"

=== Other word classes ===
There are two possible noun categories: the determinative and the indeterminative. The determinative category can be divided into definitive, non-definitive, and locative. Indeterminative nouns can be predicative words, subjects of predications, objects of transitive and transimpersonal active verbs and of static verbs, and complements of impersonal and transimpersonal active verbs and of static verbs.

Personal pronouns are inflected depending on person, number, and gender, but they do not have special forms that indicate whether they fall into the determinative or indeterminative categories. They substitute for nouns, and they can be used like nouns, except in the locative case.

The interrogative-indefinite pronouns are ka'ku "who, someone, anyone" and ka'nahku "what, something, anything." They can substitute for nouns when they do not occur in the locative case. Also, ka'nahku does not appear as an independent subject.

Quantificatives include numerals and others like ho'tu "all, everything," na'mu "many, much," ka'šku "a few, a little bit," ka'škuto'hku "several, quite a few," and ʔa'mari "enough." They can be used as minimal clauses, substitutes for nouns, modifiers of nouns, and modifiers of active verbs.

Postpositions are used to modify locatives and predicates.

Adjectives can be used as predicate words, as noun modifiers used as predicative words, or as modifiers of the interrogative-indefinite pronoun ka'nahku.

Comparatives can be used as modifiers of adjectives, static verbs, adverbs, nouns, or quantificative na'mu.

Adverbs can be used to modify auxiliary and active verbs.

Auxiliary verbs are always in a predicative word position. Active verbs are either finite or infinitive in form. Finite verbs take subjective pronominal referentials and are predicative words. Infinitives are taken as predicate complements. Sometimes, they are inflected for an objective referential. Static verbs are always inflected for an objective referential and are always predicative words.

Sentence connectives connect or contrast two sentences or sometimes two words.

Exclamatives and imitatives always appear as minimal clauses. The most predominant exclamatives are hõn "yes", ʔahâ "no", and dâ "now; ready."

== Proto-language ==
Proto-Tunica
- Reconstruction of: Tunica language

Granberry (1994: 507) reconstructs the following Proto-Tunica phonemes:

Consonants
	Labial	Apical	Palatal	Velar	Glottal
Plosive	p	t	tʃ	k	ʔ
Fricative		s	ʃ		h
Rhotic		r			
Nasal	m	n	ɲ		
Lateral		l			
Approximant	w		j		

Vowels
	Front	Central	Back
Close	i		u
Close-mid	e		o
Open-mid	ɛ		ɔ
Open		a	

== See also ==
- Gulf languages
