= Tunica-Biloxi =

Native American tribe from Mississippi and Louisiana

Tunica-Biloxi Indian Tribe Yoroniku-Halayihku (Tunica)
- Federally recognized tribe
- Location in the United States
- Coordinates: 31°06′48″N 92°03′13″W
- State Recognition: July 14, 1975
- Federal Recognition: Sept 25, 1981

Government
  - Type: Tribal Council
  - Chairman: Marshall Pierite
  - Vice Chairman: Marshall Sampson

Population
  - Total: 951
- Demonym: Tunica-Biloxi
- Time zone: UTC−06:00 (CST)
  - Summer (DST): UTC−05:00 (CDT)
- Area code: 318
- Website: https://www.tunicabiloxi.org/

The Tunica-Biloxi Indian Tribe (Tunica: Yoroniku-Halayihku), formerly known as the Tunica-Biloxi Indian Tribe of Louisiana, is a federally recognized tribe and Indian reservation comprised primarily of Tunica and Biloxi people, located in east central Louisiana. Descendants of Ofo, Avoyel, and Choctaw are also enrolled in the tribe.

In the 21st century, the Tunica-Biloxi speak mostly English and French. Many live on the Tunica-Biloxi Indian Reservation (31°06′48″N 92°03′13″W) in central Avoyelles Parish, just south of the city of Marksville, Louisiana, and overlapping its boundaries. The Reservation is 1.682 km^{2} (0.649 sq mi).

The 2010 census lists 951 persons self-identified as at least partly of Tunica-Biloxi, with 669 of those identifying as solely of Tunica-Biloxi ancestry.

== History ==
By the Middle Mississippian period, local Late Woodland peoples in the Central Mississippi Valley had developed or adopted a Mississippian lifestyle, with maize agriculture, hierarchical political structures, mussel shell-tempered pottery, and participation in the Southeastern Ceremonial Complex (SECC). The archaeological evidence suggests that the valley was home to several competing paramount chiefdoms, with supporting vassal states. The groups in the area have been defined by archaeologists by archaeological phases; these include the Menard, Tipton, Belle Meade-Walls, Parkin and Nodena phases.

In the spring of 1541 Hernando de Soto and his army approached the eastern bank of the Mississippi River, coming upon the Province of Quizquiz (pronounced "keys-key"). These people spoke a dialect of the Tunica language, which is a language isolate. At that time, these related groups covered a large region extending along both sides of the Mississippi River in present-day Mississippi and Arkansas, as the expedition would soon learn.

Off to one side of the town was the dwelling place of the Curaca (chief). It was situated on a high mound which now served as a fortress. Only by means of two stairways could one ascend to this house.... The lord of the province, who like his land was called Quizquiz, was now old and sick in bed; but on hearing the noise and confusion in his village, he arose and came from his bedchamber. Then beholding the pillage and seizure of his vassals, he grasped a battle-ax and began to descend the stairs with the greatest fury, in the meantime vowing loudly and fiercely to slay anyone who came into his land without permission.... But the memory of valiant deeds and triumphs of his bellicose youth, and the fact that he held sway over a province so large and good as his, gave him strength to utter those fierce threats and even fiercer ones.

— Inca Garcilaso de la Vega describing the Quizquiz, 1605

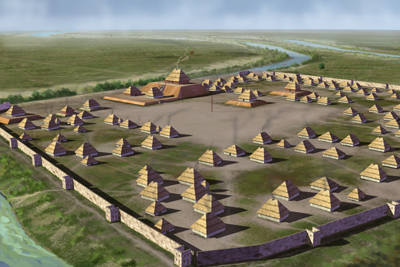
Parkin site, circa 1539. (also known as province of Casqui.) Illustration by Herb Roe

Based on evaluations of the three surviving de Soto narratives for topography, linguistics and cultural traits, combined with archaeological excavations and analysis, most archaeologists and ethnohistorians have agreed to identify the Menard, Walls, Belle Meade, Parkin and Nodena phases as the de Soto-named provinces of Anilco, Quizquiz, Aquixo, Casqui and Pacaha, respectively.

It was 150 years before another European group recorded the Tunica. In 1699 the LaSource expedition (coming downriver from French Canada) encountered the Tunica, describing them as a modestly sized tribe numbering only a few hundred warriors. They and other peoples had suffered from smallpox epidemics, which had high mortality rates as they had no natural immunity to this new disease carried by Europeans.

By the time the French arrived, the Central Mississippi Valley was sparsely occupied by the Quapaw. They became significant allies to the French and aided their successful settlement. The French established a mission among the Tunica around 1700, on the Yazoo River. Father Antoine Davion was assigned to the Tunica, as well as to the smaller tribes of the Koroa, Yazoo, and Houspé tribes.

The Tunica were skilled traders and entrepreneurs, especially in the manufacture and distribution of salt, a valuable item to both native and Europeans. Salt was extremely important in the trade between the French and the various Caddoan groups in what are now northwestern Louisiana and southwestern Arkansas. The Tunica were believed to be the middlemen in the trade of salt from the Caddoan areas to the French.

By the early 18th century, the tribes along the lower Mississippi River were a target of Chickasaw raids for the English slave trade in South Carolina. By 1706 the Tunica decided to move.

As their enemies the Natchez were to their immediate south, they moved to the Mississippi side of the Mississippi and Red River confluence. This allowed them to keep control of their salt trade, as the Red River also connected to their salt source in the Caddoan areas.

They established a loose collection of hamlets and villages at present-day Angola, Louisiana. The archeological remains of a small hamlet from this time period were discovered in 1976 by an inmate of Angola Prison. It is known as the Bloodhound Site.

During the 1710s and 1720s, war periodically broke out between the French and the Natchez. The last uprising in 1729, the Natchez Massacre, was the largest; the Natchez killed most of the French at the village of Natchez and Fort Rosalie. French colonists gained the aid of Indian allies and returned to the villages, killing or capturing most of the Natchez. The survivors were sold into slavery.

In 1729 the chiefs of the village sent emissaries to potential allies, including the Yazoo, Koroa, Illinois, Chickasaw, and Choctaw. The Natchez Rebellion or Natchez War expanded into a larger regional conflict with many repercussions. The Tunica were initially reluctant to fight on either side.

In June 1730 the Head Chief of the Tunica, Cahura-Joligo, agreed to let a small party of Natchez refugees settle near his village (present-day Angola), provided they were unarmed. A few days later, the chief of the Natchez arrived at the Tunica village with a hundred men, and an unknown number of women and children. They concealed Chickasaw and Koroa warriors in the canebrake around the village. Cahura-Joligo informed the Natchez party that he could not receive them unless they gave up their arms. They said they intended to do so, but asked to keep their arms a while longer. He consented and had food distributed to his new guests. A dance was held that night. After the dance and when the village had gone to sleep, the Natchez, Chickasaw and Koroa attacked their hosts. Cahura-Joligo killed four Natchez during the fighting, but was killed along with 12 of his warriors. His war chief Brides les Boeufs (Buffalo Tamer) repulsed the attack. He rallied the warriors, and after fighting for five days and nights, regained control of the village. Twenty Tunica were killed and as many wounded in the fighting. They killed 33 of the Natchez warriors.

After the attack at Angola, in 1731 the Tunica moved a few miles away to the Trudeau site. Over the years, they buried as grave goods large amounts of European trade goods, including beads, porcelain, muskets, kettles, and other items, as well as locally produced Tunica pottery and imported pottery. When discovered in the 20th century, these artifacts attested to their extensive trade with Europeans, as well as the wealth of the Tunica.

They stayed at this location into the 1760s, when the French ceded control west of the Mississippi to the Spanish following the French defeat by the British in the Seven Years' War.

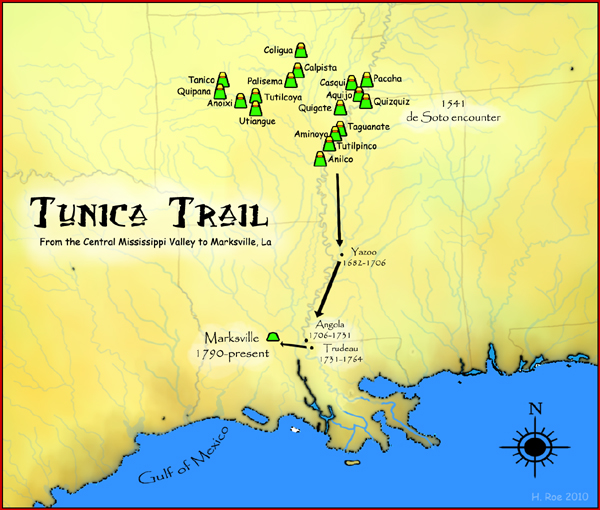
Tunica Trail from the Central Mississippi valley to Marksville, LA

In 1764 the Tunica moved 15 miles (24 km) south of the Trudeau Landing site to just outside the French settlement at Pointe Coupée, Louisiana. Other tribes had also settled in the area, including the Ofo, Pascagoula and Biloxi. The latter came to have a close relationship with the Tunica people. During this time, numerous Anglo-American settlers migrated into the region, as the British had taken over former French territories east of the Mississippi River. The Tunica had become acculturated to European ways, although they still tattooed themselves and practiced some of their native religious customs. With the British in charge of the Western Florida colony at this time, and the Spanish in control of Louisiana, politics were volatile in the area. In 1779 Governor Galvez led a force, which included Tunica and other tribal warriors, to take the British-held town of Baton Rouge. This was the last military campaign for which the Tunica were recorded.

By sometime in the late 1780s or 1790s, the Tunica moved again, probably because of the large influx of Anglo-Americans moving into the area. They moved west to a site on the Red River named Avoyelles. In 1794 Marco Litche (recorded by the French as Marc Eliche), a Sephardic Jewish trader from Venice, established a trading post in the area. A European-American settlement developed around the post and became known as Marksville. It was noted on Louisiana maps as of 1809.

== After acquisition by US ==
The Tunica saw their land greatly reduced following the Louisiana purchase in 1803. The Moreau family, prominent landholders in the area, frequently came into conflict with the Tunica. In 1826, they challenged the tribe’s claim to its land on Bayou Rouge, arguing that it was already contested. The Tunica maintained that the Spanish had granted them title to the land and it was therefore both legally and traditionally theirs. The federal register ultimately ruled in favour of Celestin Moreau, stating that because the tribe did not farm or cultivate the land and instead lived as “savages,” they did not have a title to it.

Conflict between the Moreau family and the Tunica continued. In 1841, Celestin Moreau attempted to erect a fence preventing the Tunica from accessing their village on the Bordelon Tract. When the tribal chief, Malancon, intervened, Tunica oral tradition states that Moreau killed him in front of other Tunica. The dispute led to a trespassing case in 1842 concerning 718 acres of land. In 1848, the Tunica and Moreau reached an out-of-court agreement under which the tribe retained title to only 130 acres, a substantial reduction from the land it had claimed.

The only U.S. government mention of the Tunica from 1803 to 1938 was made in 1806 by an Indian Commissioner for Louisiana. He noted that the Tunica numbered only about 25 men, lived in Avoyelles Parish, and made their livings by occasionally hiring out as boatmen.

== 20th century to present ==
Left to right: Alice Picote, Sesostrie Youchigant, and Cora Chiki, members of the Tunica-Biloxi Indian Tribe. Photo taken in 1915.

Gradually the remnant descendants of other local tribes (the Ofo, Avoyel, Choctaw, and Biloxi) merged into the Tunica. They have preserved much of their ethnic identity, maintaining their tribal government and the hereditary chieftainship up to the mid-1970s.

The modern Tunica-Biloxi tribe, which has a written constitution and elected government, was recognized by the federal government in 1981. They live in east central Louisiana. The modern tribe is composed of Tunica, Biloxi (a Siouan-speaking people from the Gulf coast), Ofo (also a Siouan people), Avoyel, and Mississippi Choctaw. Many live on the Tunica-Biloxi Indian Reservation in central Avoyelles Parish, just south of the city of Marksville, Louisiana. A part of the city extends onto reservation land.

The reservation has a land area of 1.682 km^{2} (0.649 sq mi). Currently, they operate Louisiana's first land based casino, Paragon Casino Resort, opened in Marksville in June 1994. The casino is known for its contributions back to its members. The 2000 census lists 648 persons identified as Tunica.

Tribal government currently consists of an elected tribal council and tribal chairman. The tribe maintains its own police force, health services, education department, housing authority, and court system. Former tribal chairman Earl J. Barbry Sr., was widely noted as one of the longest-serving chairmen in Indian Country, serving from 1978 until his death in July 2013. Barbry was succeeded as chairman by Marshall Pierite, formerly vice chairman of the tribe, from August 2013 through April 2014. Barbry's son, Joey Barbry, served as chairman from April 2014. Marshall Pierite again became chairman upon his election in April 2018.

=== Federal recognition efforts ===
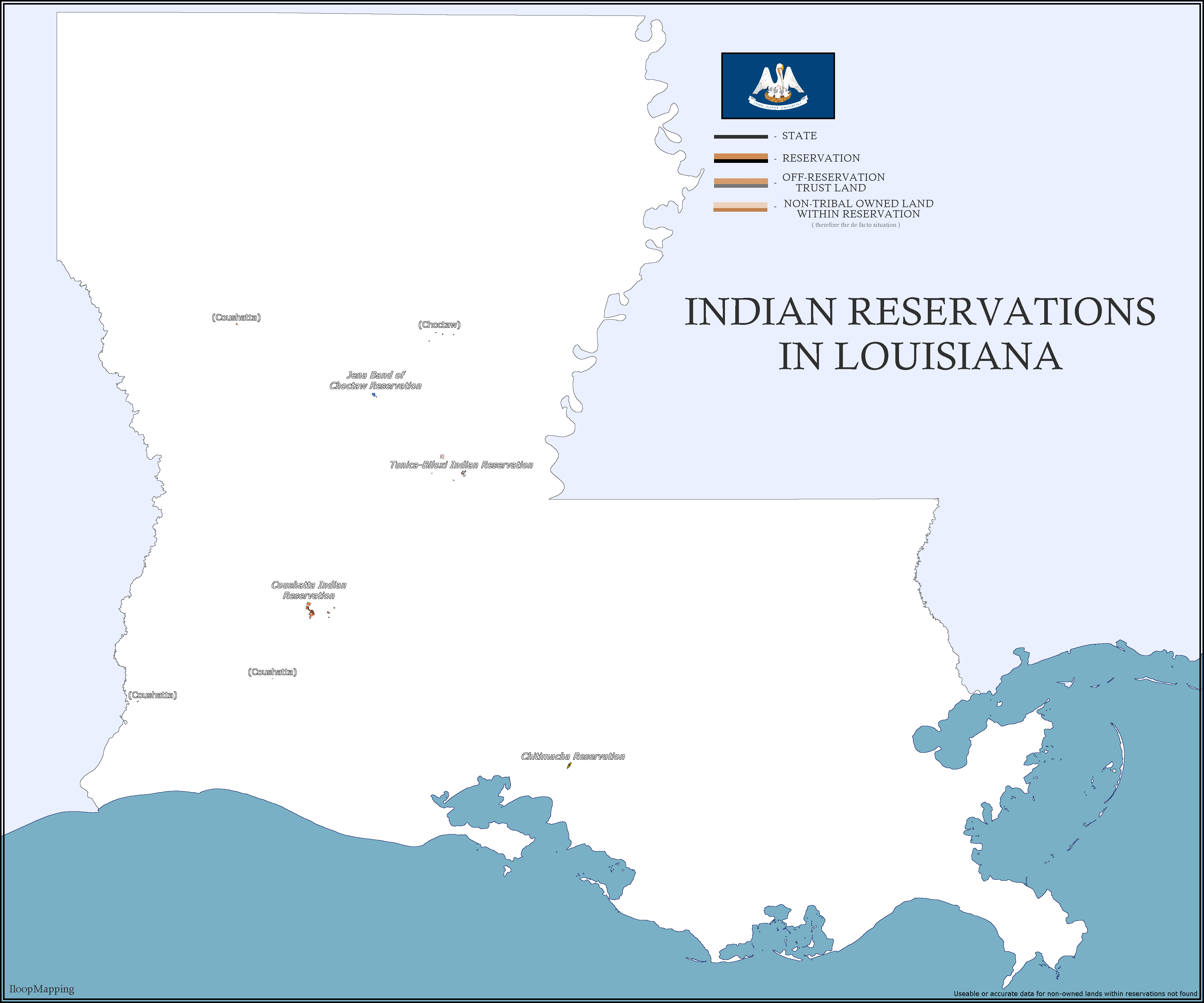
Map of the Tunica-Biloxi and neighboring tribes.

In 1915, Arsene Chiki, the Mother of Chief Sesostrie Youchigant, was killed by a train. Youchigant attempted to sue the railroad company for the wrongful death. However because his parents had married under tribal custom, it was never legally recognised by the state. Under Louisiana inheritance law at the time, this designated Youchigant as an illegitimate child. Barring him from both inheriting property and filing a wrongful death suit for his parents. Consequently, local courts and the Louisiana Supreme Court dismissed the case.

Believing that federal recognition was necessary to protect tribal members from such legal discrimination, Youchigant initiated efforts to secure federal recognition for the tribe, a campaign continued by successor chiefs, Ernest Pierite and Eli Barbry.

Formal efforts to be recognized by the federal government were begun in the 1930s when Chief Eli Barbry, Horace Pierite, Clarence Jackson, and Sam Barbry traveled to Washington, D.C. to consult with the Bureau of Indian Affairs. Federal recognition would have entitled the tribe to benefit from social programs under the Indian Reorganization Act of 1934. A succession of chiefs, including Chief Horace Pierite Sr, would work at the task. With the Tunica treasure proving their ancient tribal identity, the tribe was able to gain state and federal recognition. They were recognized by the United States government in 1981 as the Tunica Biloxi Indians of Louisiana, later taking the name of Tunica-Biloxi Indian Tribe.

In the 1930s, many Tunica-Biloxi left for eastern Texas for forestry work. The tribe sought to regain its Bayou Rouge lands to sell them and distribute the proceeds among impoverished families remaining in Marksville. John Collier of the Office of Indian Affairs argued that no federal jurisdiction existed over the Tunica, that they were declining in number, and that they'd forfeited their land claims by failing to file them in the district court in Missouri prior to 1849. Collier apparently did not know that the Tunica had lost the land through the same court.

In 1938, the tribe raised funds to send a delegation to Washington, where they met with the assistant to the commissioner of Indian Affairs. The delegation explained that providing opportunities for those remaining in Marksville would encourage members who had moved to Texas to return. They also asked for assistance with schooling as they were excluded from white schools but would not attend schools for African Americans. Officials told them the matter would be investigated.

The following month the BIA sent anthropologist Ruth Underhill to investigate. Underhill attributed the tribe's difficulties primarily to racial discrimination and characterized the Tunica-Biloxi as an ambiguous people rather than an established Indigenous tribe. She recorded statements from white residents of Marksville who said the Tunica were socially classified as African Americans and referred to as "redbones," a slur used against the tribe in the area. Underhill reported that Tunica wished to leave Marksville because they believed they were treated as African Americans. This differed from the plans expressed by the tribal delegation which sought to regain their land and create opportunities for members in Texas to return.

Underhill’s report would subsequently be used by Assistant Commissioner of Indian Affairs Fred Daiker in rejecting the Tunica-Biloxi’s efforts for federal recognition in 1938.

In 1948, Chief Horace Pierite and Subchief Joe Pierite sought assistance from A.H McMullen, superintendent of the Choctaw Agency. McMullen subsequently met with the Avoyelles School Board and negotiated an agreement allowing Tunica children without African ancestry to attend white schools.

During the 1900s, the Tunica-Biloxi banished members from the reservation if they married African Americans and excluded people with African ancestry from the tribal rolls. The policy began to relax in the 1970s, when Herman Pierite, brother of Chief Joe Pierite, served on the tribal council despite being married to an African American. His children and grandchildren, however, remained ineligible for enrollment. Herman’s grandson, Moses Sampson, recalled that few tribal families visited their home during the 1970s.

Herman later secured a promise from chief Earl Barbry to enroll his descendants. Following federal recognition in 1981, Barbry ended the exclusion of members with African ancestry from the tribe.

=== Tunica treasure ===
In the 1960s a treasure hunter named Leonard Charrier began searching for artifacts at the Trudeau Landing site in West Feliciana Parish, Louisiana. The Tunica, who felt he had stolen tribal heirlooms and desecrated the graves of their ancestors, were outraged.

In the 1970s the site was excavated by archaeologists, uncovering large amounts of pottery, European trade goods and other artifacts deposited as grave goods by the Tunica from 1731 to 1764 when they occupied the site. With help from the State of Louisiana, the tribe filed suit to gain title to the artifacts, which has subsequently become known as the "Tunica treasure". The case took a decade to be decided in the courts, but the ruling became a landmark in American Indian history. It helped to lay the groundwork for new federal legislation, the Native American Graves Protection and Repatriation Act (NAGPRA), passed in 1990.

Because the artifacts had been separated from the original burials and connections were lost, the tribe decided to build a museum to house these items. Members of the tribe were trained as conservators in order to repair damage done to the artifacts by the centuries underground and handling during the ten-year court battle. The museum was built in the shape of the ancient temple mounds of their people, with the earthen structure to take the symbolic place of the original burial underground. It opened in 1989 as The Tunica-Biloxi Regional Indian Center and Museum. Due to structural problems, it was closed in 1999, with plans for a new larger facility underway. Today the Tunica Treasure collection is housed in the Tunica-Biloxi Cultural and Educational Resources Center, a state-of-the-art facility that includes a library, conservation center, distance-learning center, conference facilities, tribal offices, and museum on the tribal reservation in Marksville. Eighty percent of the artifacts of the Tunica Treasure have been restored.

=== Economic development ===
Location of Tunica-Biloxi Indian Reservation in Louisiana

The Tunica-Biloxi Tribe operates Louisiana's first land-based casino, Paragon Casino Resort. It opened in Marksville in June 1994. It is the largest employer in Avoyelles Parish.

The Tribe also owns and operates a Tribal Lending Enterprise—the online installment loan company, Mobiloans—and a finance and production company, Acacia Entertainment. Mobiloans works with Think Finance on underwriting, loan servicing, and other technology processes related to running the business. Acacia Entertainment is a joint venture between the Tribe's Economic Development Corporation and film producer Matthew George. According to the Tribe, Acacia aims to produce two to three films per year.

== Tunica and Biloxi languages ==
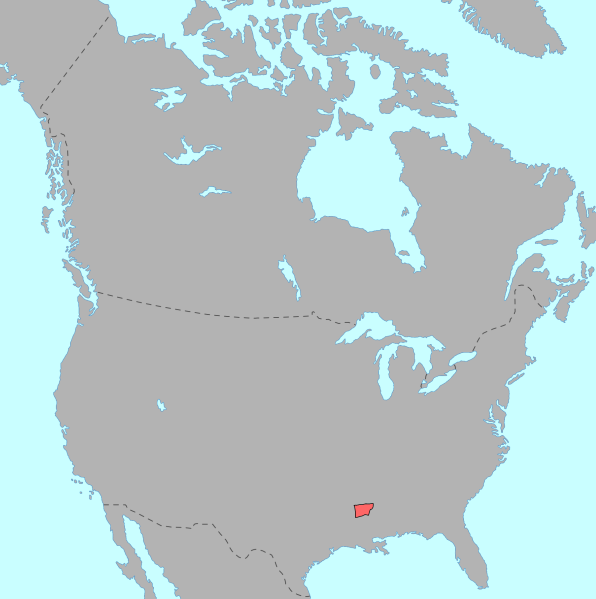
Tunica language

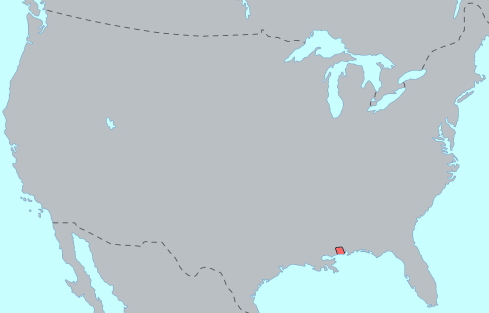
Biloxi language

The Tunica (or Tonica, or less common form Yuron) language is a language isolate. The Tunica tribe historically lived close to the Ofo and Avoyeles tribes, but communication among the three depended on their use of the Mobilian Jargon or French.

The last known native speaker of the Tunica language, Sesostrie Youchigant, died in 1948. Linguist Mary Haas had worked with Youchigant in the 1930s to describe what he remembered of the language. She published the description in A Grammar of the Tunica Language in 1941, followed by Tunica Texts in 1950, and Tunica Dictionary in 1953. Tunica is a reawakening language, with immersion programs and youth summer camps teaching second-language learners.

The Biloxi language is a Siouan language which was at one time spoken by the Biloxi people in Louisiana and southeast Texas. The Biloxi were first noted in European records as living along the Biloxi Bay in the mid-17th century, but by the mid-18th century, they had migrated into Louisiana to avoid European encroachment. Some were also noted in Texas in the early 19th century. By the early 19th century their numbers had dwindled. In 1934, the last native speaker, Emma Jackson, was in her 80s. Morris Swadesh and Mary Haas met her on a linguistic survey trip in September 1934 and confirmed her status as a speaker of the language.

Most modern Tunica speak English, with a few older members speaking French as a first language.

== Notable Tunica-Biloxi ==
- Allen Barbre, an American football offensive tackle who plays for the Denver Broncos
- Earl Barbry, an American politician and Native American leader, former chairman of the Tunica-Biloxi Tribe
- Horace Pierite Sr., chief of the Tunica-Biloxi tribe
- Sesostrie Youchigant, chief of the Tunica-Biloxi tribe and last Tunica native speaker, provided information about the Tunica language to researchers

== See also ==
- List of sites and peoples visited by the Hernando de Soto Expedition
- Mississippi Band of Choctaw Indians
- Jena Band of Choctaw Indians
- Coushatta Tribe of Louisiana
