= Mobilian Jargon =

1700s–1950s indigenous pidgin of the coastal southern US

- Yamá
- Native to: United States
- Region: Gulf coast and Mississippi Valley
- Extinct: 1950s
- Language family: Western Muskogean-based pidgin: Mobilian Jargon

Language codes
- ISO 639-3: mod
- Glottolog: mobi1236

Mobilian Jargon (also Mobilian trade language, Mobilian Trade Jargon, Chickasaw–Choctaw trade language, Yamá) was a pidgin used as a lingua franca among Native American groups living along the north coast of the Gulf of Mexico around the time of European settlement of the region. It was the main language among Native tribes in this area, mainly Louisiana. There is evidence indicating its existence as early as the late 17th to early 18th century. The Native groups that are said to have used it were the Alabama, Apalachee, Biloxi, Chacato, Pakana, Pascagoula, Taensa, Tunica, Caddo, Chickasaw, Houma, Choctaw, Chitimacha, Natchez, and Ofo. The name is thought to refer to the Mobile Indians of the central Gulf Coast, but did not originate from this group; Mobilian Jargon is linguistically and grammatically different from the language traditionally spoken by the Mobile Indians.

Mobilian Jargon facilitated trade between tribes speaking different languages and settlers from Europe and Africa. There is continuing debate as to when Mobilian Jargon first began to be spoken. Some scholars, such as James Crawford, have argued that Mobilian Jargon has its origins in the linguistically diverse environment following the establishment of the French colony of Louisiana. Others, however, suggest that the already linguistically diverse environment of the lower Mississippi basin drove the need for a common method of communication prior to regular contact with Europeans.

The Native Americans of the Gulf coast and Mississippi valley have always spoken multiple languages, mainly the languages of the other tribes that inhabited the same area. The Mobilians, like these neighboring tribes, were also multi-lingual. By the early 19th century, Mobilian Jargon evolved from functioning solely as a contact language between people into a means of personal identification. With an increasing presence of outsiders in the Indian Gulf coast community, Mobilian Jargon served as a way of knowing who was truly a native of the area, and allowed Mobilians to be socially isolated from non-Indian population expansion from the north.

== History ==
=== Origins ===
The accepted view of the origin is that it developed from contact with the French in the 18th century. But there is obscurity in that. It seems that there was a pre-European origin that is supported through its well-established use in diverse indigenous contexts, geographic overlapping with that of Southeastern Indian groups formerly associated in multilingual paramount chiefdoms of the pre-Columbian Mississippian complex, and its indigenous grammar. Mobilian Jargon has a recorded history of at least 250 years where the first reliable evidence dated 1700. For two centuries it was socially accepted to use as a lingua franca with the outsiders they interacted with, such as traders and settlers. It is presumed that fur traders spread the language to Choctaw and Chickasaw provinces. Though Indians spoke in Mobilian Jargon to outsiders, the outsiders did not have a full understanding of how special the nature and functions of Mobilian Jargon was. Because of this, the Indians created a cultural barrier, preserving their cultural integrity and privacy from non-Indian groups. The pervasiveness of Mobilian Jargon, as a result, created its longtime survival.

Mobilian Jargon is a pidginized or "corrupted"/"complex" form of Choctaw and Chickasaw (both Western Muskogean) that also contains elements of Eastern Muskogean languages such as Alabama and Koasati, colonial languages including Spanish, French, and English, and perhaps Algonquian and/or other languages. Pamela Munro has argued that Choctaw is the major contributing language (not both Choctaw and Chickasaw) although this has been challenged by Emanuel Drechsel. He has concluded that the presence of certain Algonquian words in Mobilian Jargon are the result of direct contact between the Mobilians of the Mississippi valley and Algonquians moving southward. For the most part, these "loanwords" differ by only one or two letters.

=== Extinction ===
Mobilian has not survived as a functional language. There is documentary evidence of it in numerous historical records such as journals, diaries, reports and scholarly treatments. What was recorded, though, was very little, and it is safe to assume that Europeans did not have a full understanding of Mobilian. They believed that Mobilian was the mother of all other Indian languages, failing to notice that it was actually a hybrid of the Choctaw and Chickasaw languages.

=== Revival ===
When it was no longer needed as a spoken trade language, Mobilian was lost and eventually became extinct. It was first written about in the 1700s and was spoken until the 1950s. In the 1980s, elders in the Louisiana region could still recall a few words and phrases. In 2012, the Mezcal Jazz Unit of Montpellier, France, collaborated by Internet with Grayhawk Perkins, a historian of the Houma people, to make a recording titled Thirteen Moons, which features "the soulful chants of ancient folk tales and more modern stories told in Mobilian."

== Geographical distribution ==
Mobilian was used from the Florida northwest coast and area of the current Alabama-Georgia border westward as far as eastern Texas and in the north from the lower Mississippi Valley (currently south and central Illinois) to the southern Mississippi River Delta region in the south. It is known to have been used by the Alabama, Apalachee, Biloxi, Chacato, Pakana, Pascagoula, Taensa, Tunica, Caddo, Chickasaw, Choctaw, Chitimacha, Natchez, and Ofo. There is some evidence that Mobilian Jargon was used about 500 miles upstream the Missouri River near the Oyo or Osage Indians during the late 18th century. Some scholars also have reason to believe that the language was used or somehow came in contact with groups using the Algonquian languages of the Northeast to Midwest, with which Mobilian Jargon shares a number of words, such as papo(s) or papoš, meaning 'baby, child', which undeniably resembles the Narragansett word with the same meaning, pápūs. It is unknown how the crossover between the languages occurred; some possibilities include direct contact with Algonquian-speaking peoples in Virginia and North Carolina, or perhaps contact with French explorers using the Algonquian language at the time. Other Europeans also learned the language, but not in a way where they understood the cultural aspects of it; just enough for them to be able to trade with the Indians.

== Phonology ==
Consonants
		Bilabial	Labio-Dental	Dental/Alveolar	Palatal	Velar	Glottal
Plosive	Voiceless	p		t	c	k	
Plosive	Voiced	b				g	
Fricative			f	s	ʝ (ç)		h
Nasal		m		n			
Liquid				l (r)			
Semivowel		w			j		

Vowel
	Front	Central	Back
Close Mid	e		o
Mid		ə	
Open		ä	

== Grammar ==
In its syntax, Mobilian Jargon was fundamentally Muskogean and compared to other southeastern Indian tribes it showed a reduced morphology. Its lexicon shares major similarities to other Muskogean languages, in particular to Chickasaw and to Alabama. Though it evolved from more complex and polysynthetic Native American languages, Mobilian Jargon has a simpler structure where verbs are not required to have subject or object affixes and the subject-object-verb ordering in the sentence is variable. It also requires a separate word after the verb to indicate tense, whereas Muskogean languages use a suffix. It has a simplified syllable and sound structure and a simplified grammar as compared to Choctaw, its primary parent language. Mobilian Jargon was at one point a Muskogean- based pidgin. It was linguistically reduced from analytical grammar. Mobilian Jargon related to Muskogean proper linguistics and historical facts. Mobilians used a lot of Western Muskogean in their spoken language. Compare the personal pronouns among Muskogean languages:

English	Mobilian	Alabama	Choctaw	Chickasaw
I	inu	ino	ano	ano, ino
you	išnu	isno	čišno	ishno
we	pošnu	posno	pišno	poshno

== Lexicon ==
Mobilian Jargon consists of about 1,250 words of various origins. Of 150 words studied most were from Western Muskogean/Choctaw-Chickisaw, 20 were split between Western Muskogean and Alabama-Koasati, 14 were from Alabama-Koasati, 3 were from English, 2 were from Spanish, 1 was from French, and one from Algonquin.

=== Sample words ===
Mobilian	English
Pinni	Pirogue
Tayambo	Cup
Tananbo	Gun
Anounacha-bénilé	Chair
Mite	Come
Nichekine	Eye
Lowack	Fire
Tchouka	House
Bachepo	Knife
Atchi-ninack	Moon
Pissa	Look
Atchi-lachepa	Sun
Bana	Want
Oke	Water
