= Earl Barbry =

American politician (1950–2013)

Chairman of the Tunica-Biloxi Tribe
- In office 1978–2013

Personal details
- Born: Earl Joseph Barbry Sr. October 2, 1950
- Died: July 31, 2013 (aged 62) Alexandria, Louisiana

Earl Joseph Barbry Sr. (October 2, 1950 − July 31, 2013) was an American politician and Native American leader who served as the Chairman of the Tunica-Biloxi tribe from 1978 to 2013.

Raised on the Tunica-Biloxi Indian reservation, in Marksville, Louisiana, Barbry was elected tribal chairman of the Tunica-Biloxi tribe of Louisiana in 1978 and served until his death. In September 1981, the tribe received recognition from the United States Government. He also help opened a hotel-casino for the tribe. Barbry died of cancer on July 31, 2013, aged 62, in Alexandria, Louisiana. He was also the longest serving leader of any federally recognized tribe in the United States.

== See also ==
- Tunica-Biloxi
- Marksville, Louisiana
- Mansura, Louisiana
- Avoyelles Parish, Louisiana
- Isle Brevelle
- Horace Pierrite
