= Pascagoula =

Defunct tribe in present-day Mississippi, USA

The Pascagoula (also Pascoboula, Pacha-Ogoula, Pascagola, Pascaboula, Paskaguna) were an indigenous group living in coastal Mississippi on the Pascagoula River.

The name Pascagoula is a Choctaw term meaning "bread eater". Choctaw native Americans using the name Pascagoula are named after the words for "bread eaters".

== History ==
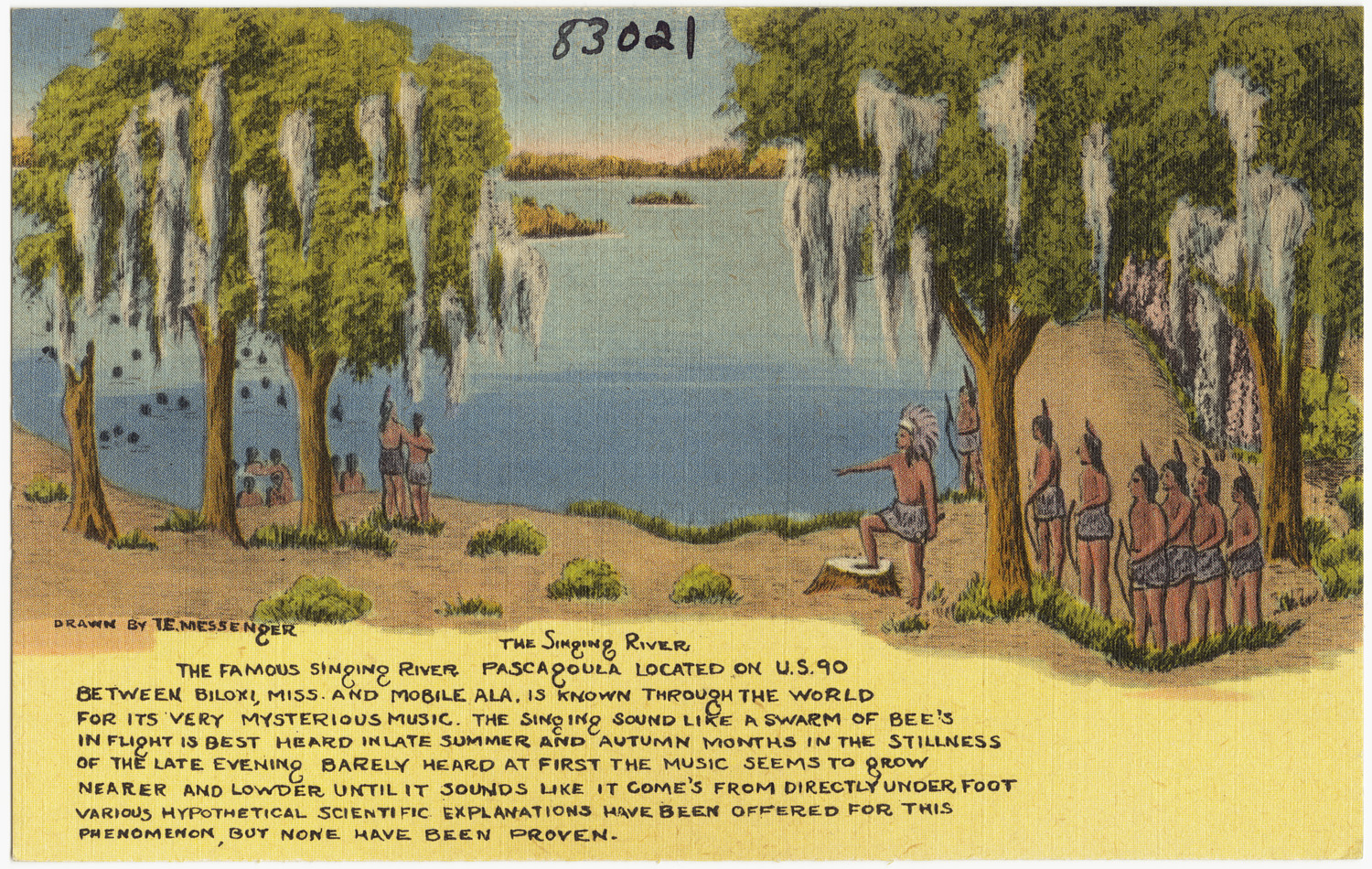
The Singing River

Pierre Le Moyne d'Iberville encountered the tribe in 1699 and was impressed by the beauty of Pascagoula women. According to local Euro-American legend, the peace-loving tribe walked single file into the river because the local Biloxi tribe were planning to attack. Anola, a Biloxi "princess", eloped with the Pascagoula chief Altama, although she was engaged to a Biloxi chieftain. Anola's angry would-be husband led his soldiers into battle with the Pascagoula. Outnumbered and fearing enslavement by the Biloxi, the tribe joined hands and walked into the river singing a death song. The river became known as the "Singing River" because of this death song, which reportedly can still be heard at night.

== Language ==
Pascagoula
- (unattested)
- Region: Mississippi
- Extinct: (date missing)
- Language family: unclassified

Language codes
- ISO 639-3: None (mis)
- Linguist List: 07q
- Glottolog: None

John Sibley reported that they spoke their own language which was different from neighboring languages in addition to Mobilian Jargon. Their language is undocumented.

== Bibliography ==
- Goddard, Ives (2005). The indigenous languages of the Southeast. Anthropological Linguistics. 47 (1): 1–60.
- Higginbotham, Jay (Trans., Ed.). (1969). The journal of Sauvole. Mobile: Colonial Books.
- McWilliams, Richebourg G. (Ed., Trans.). (1981). Iberville's gulf journals. University: University of Alabama Press.
- Le Page du Pratz, Antoine Simon. (1758). Histoire de la Louisiana (Vols. 1–3). Paris: De Bure.
- Sibley, John. (1806). Historical sketches of the several Indian tribes in Louisiana, south of the Arkansas River, and between the Mississippi and River Grand. In T. Jefferson (Ed.), Message from the President of the United States communicating the discoveries made in exploring the Missouri, Red River, and Washita (pp. 48–62). New York: G. F. Hopkins.
