= Gulf languages =

Proposed language family

Gulf
- (proposed)
- Geographic distribution: Gulf Coast, United States
- Linguistic classification: Proposed language family
- Subdivisions: Muskogean; Natchez; Tunica; Atakapa; ? Chitimacha

Language codes
- Glottolog: None

The Gulf languages are a proposed family of native North American languages composed of the Muskogean languages, along with four language isolates: Natchez, Tunica, Atakapa, and (possibly) Chitimacha.

== History of proposal ==
Gulf was proposed as a language family by Mary Haas (Haas 1951, 1952), but the family has not been rigorously established by the comparative method. Historical linguists such as Lyle Campbell (Campbell and Mithun 1979, Campbell 1997) list the relationship as unproven, though a number of Muskogean scholars believe that Muskogean is at least related to Natchez (Campbell 1997:305).

However, the Gulf hypothesis is considered by a number of specialists on Muskogean languages, including Mary Haas and Pamela Munro. Munro (1995) has regarded the hypothesis of a Gulf family of languages as promising; Haas thought the closest language to Muskogean would be Natchez, followed by Tunica, Atakapa, and, rather dubiously, Chitimacha. A difficulty in evaluating the hypothesis is the lack of available data. Most of the data on Chitimacha and Natchez is still unpublished and held in archives.

Additionally, Haas (1958) proposed that the Gulf languages are related to the Algonquian languages.

== Lexical comparisons ==
Lexical comparisons by Kimball (1994) showing areal similarities among the "Gulf" languages:

| gloss | Proto-Muskogean | Tunica |
|---|---|---|
| sibling of opposite sex | *xaya | -áhaya 'sister-in-law' |
| to want | *kʷanna | -wána |
| big gray heron | *watola | wátoru-hki 'whooping crane' |
| fruit; to bear fruit | *aθi | ʔélu |
| willow | osí (Koasati) | ʔx̌ša |

| gloss | Tunica | Natchez |
|---|---|---|
| to stick in | čáhka | cak- |
| to drip | čólu | col- |
| corn | háhka | haku |
| to gulp | kɔ́ra | kolkol- |
| to put in the mouth | káhpu | hi-kap- |
| chicken | kápaši | kapaꞏht(i) |
| wild goose | lálahki | láꞏlak |
| to fart | píhču | pic- |
| to shine | réma | leM- |
| to snore | róhku | loꞏk- |
| sassafras | rɔ́wasi | waꞏ |
| to blow the nose | šímu | šiꞏM- |
| to blow (of wind) | wíhu | *wiꞏW- |
| wild potato | ʔɔ́ška- | ʔac |
| to cough | ʔúhu | ʔohoꞏ- |
| like, resembling | -nahku | -neke |
| intestines | -yóni | ʔuꞏnuh |

| gloss | Tunica | Chitimacha |
|---|---|---|
| man / men | ší | ʔasi / ʔayš |
| ear | -ála-wɛ́ča | waʔaš |
| kingfisher | čárina | čana |
| cypress | háhku | ʔak-šuš |
| to die | lúpi | nuꞏp- |
| war | náka | nakš |

| gloss | Tunica | Atakapa |
|---|---|---|
| black | méli | meːl |
| to call | wáli | wan |

| gloss | Natchez | Proto-Muskogean |
|---|---|---|
| to buy | ciꞏp-hakiʔiš | *čoʔpa |
| pine tree | col | *čolyi |
| squash | coꞏY | *tahayo |
| fox / bark or yelp like a fox | kaWkup | *kaxʷ-ka |
| six | lahanaW | *xana-li |
| perch / fish | šaꞏš(i) | *θaθi-xo |
| wife | ʔaꞏL | *xalki |
| tooth | ʔeNt | *innoti |
| ten | ʔoꞏko | *poko-li |
| nothing but | -aꞏnah | (Koasati) -nánna |
| ergative / nominative | -c | -*t |
| absolutive / accusative | -n | -*n |

| gloss | Natchez | Chitimacha |
|---|---|---|
| water / liquid | kuN | kuꞏ |
| hundred | puꞏp | puꞏp |
| cow | waštaꞏN | waštik |
| spider web | weykoL | way’ |
| to hear | ʔeꞏp-le-halʔiš | wopi- |
| vulture | ʔoꞏši | ʔoꞏš |
| twenty / two | ʔoꞏk-ahp | ʔupa |

| gloss | Natchez | Atakapa |
|---|---|---|
| name | ʔinu | eːŋ |
| persimmon | ʔoꞏ | oːl |

| gloss | Chitimacha | Atakapa |
|---|---|---|
| ten | heyč’i | hišiŋ |
| liver | kesi | keːc(k) |
| woman | kiča | kiš |
| gourd | kupu | kipaco |
| earth | ney | neː |
| Spanish moss | siꞏc | šiːt |
| mulberry | sisč’up | ses |
| beaver | ʔaꞏci | oc |

| gloss | Atakapa | Proto-Muskogean |
|---|---|---|
| shell | iwal | xʷolo |

| gloss | Tunica | Proto-Muskogean | Natchez |
|---|---|---|---|
| red-headed woodpecker | čuhčuhina | *čaxčahka | cawcah |
| pileated woodpecker | páhpahkana | *kʷahkʷa-ka | pakpakuꞏ-šiꞏL |
| robin (Quapaw šį́kkokkóke) | wiškʔohku | *č/kʷiskoko | miškokʷ |
| breast | ʔúču | *piči 'suckle; breasts' | šuꞏ |

| gloss | Tunica | Chitimacha | Natchez | Atakapa | Proto-Muskogean |
|---|---|---|---|---|---|
| hackberry | kó- | kamu | koŋ | | |
| negative | -ʔaha | | -haꞏt | -hah | |
| wind | húri | howi | | hi | |
| uncle | | waʔa / waꞏ | ʔaweh | wahš | |
| hand | ʔiꞏš | waši | woːš / wiːš | | |
| to give | | ʔaꞏ- | ha-ku-ši-ʔiš | | *im-aka |
| skunk | šíki | kištʔeʔe | šic | šikitiš | |

=== Comparisons with Algonquian ===
Some lexical similarities between the Algonquian and Gulf languages given by Haas (1958):

| gloss | Proto- Central Algonquian | Proto-Muskogean | Natchez | Tunica | Chitimacha | Atakapa |
|---|---|---|---|---|---|---|
| beat | *pak- | — | paꞏk- | pɛ́ka | — | pak |
| cold | *tahk- | — | takap- | láka | č’aki | — |
| cut | *kiꞏšk- | *kač- | kec- | káhču | — | kec |
| die | *nepe- | *ili- | — | lúpi | nuꞏp- | (pih) |
| fish | *nameꞏ- | *ɴaɴi/u | ʔeɴ | níni | (ni-) | nti |
| hand | *-neθk-i | *-mkʷi | — | -hkeni | | nok |
| name | *-iꞏn- | — | ʔinu | — | nuy-t- | eŋ |
| neck | *-hkweꞏ- | — | kʷaht | — | k’eʔ | koy |
| night | *tepeθk- | — | tewe | láwu | t’apk’i | iti |
| one | *kwet-; *nekwet- | — | wiꞏt- | | ʔunk’u | (ta)nuk |
| scrape | *kaꞏšk- | *kaꞏs- | koꞏc- | kɔ́sa | k’atka- | kau-š |
| see | *neꞏw- | — | ʔeʟ- | hɛ́ra | heč-t- | ini |
| sharp(en) | *kiꞏn-t- | *xʷulut- | pilit- | kíri | kihci | kini |
| shoot | *pemw-, *-el- | — | -epenel- | — | paꞏhma- | pem |
| split | *paꞏθk- | *paƚ- | paꞏʟ- | pása | [č]ap-t- | paƚ |
| swallow | *kwan- | *kʷalak- | -akun- | kɔ́ra | kaꞏč-t- | kul |
| tail | *-aθany- | *haci | ʔisi | -ása | mahči | — |
| three | *neʔθ- | — | neꞏ- | ʔéni- | — | lat |
| through | *šaꞏpw- | *ƚuput- | — | šíhpu | — | ƚop |
| tree | *meʔtekw- | *itti/u | cuꞏ | ríhku | šuš | — |
| turn | *kwetekw- | — | kitip- | kúra | kut’ih-t- | — |

== Pronominal comparisons ==
Below are pronouns comparisons by Geoffrey Kimball (1994) showing areal similarities among the "Gulf" languages. Note that Tunica distinguishes masculine and feminine pronominal forms.

Independent pronouns
| gloss | Proto-Muskogean | Tunica | Natchez | Chitimacha | Atakapa |
|---|---|---|---|---|---|
| I | *ano | ʔíma | takeꞏha | ʔiš | wiš |
| you | *ično | má (M); hɛ́ma (F) | ʔakahni | himʔ | naš |
| s/he | — | ʔúwi (M); tíhci (F) | ʔišina | hus | haːš |
| we | *posno | ʔinima | takahniꞏ | ʔus | yukitiš |
| you (pl) | *hačno | wínima (M); hínima (F) | ʔaNkahniꞏ | was | nakit |
| they | — | sɛ́ma (M); sínima (F) | ʔišinaꞏniꞏ | hunks | hakitiš |

Possessive pronouns
| gloss | Proto-Muskogean | Tunica | Natchez | Chitimacha | Atakapa |
|---|---|---|---|---|---|
| my | *ca- / *am- | ʔi- | -niš | ʔiš | wi |
| your | *či- / *čim- | wi- (M); hi-, he- (F) | -piš | himʔ | na |
| her / his | *i- / *im- | ʔu- (M); ti- (F) | -ʔiš | hus | ha |
| our | *po- / pom- | ʔi-n | — | ʔus | yukit |
| your (pl) | *hači- / *hačim- | wi-n- (M); hi-n- (F) | — | was | nakit |
| their | — | si- (M); si-n- (F) | — | hunks | hakit |

Agentive pronouns
| gloss | Proto-Muskogean | Tunica | Natchez | Chitimacha | Atakapa |
|---|---|---|---|---|---|
| I | *-li | -ni | ta- / ya- / ʔa- (ka-) | -ki | -o |
| you | *ič- / *či- | wí- (M); hɛ́- (F) | pan- / pi- / paꞏ- | -iʔi | naš |
| s/he | *Ø- | ʔú- (M); ʔá- (F) | na- / ʔi- / ʔaꞏ- | -iʔi | haš |
| we | *il- / -*li | ʔína- | | -naka | -cel |
| you (pl) | *hač- / *-hači | wína- (M); hɛ́na- (F) | — | -naʔa | -tem |
| they | *Ø | ʔúna- (M); sina- (F) | — | -naʔa | -oɬ |

Patient pronouns
| gloss | Proto-Muskogean | Tunica | Natchez | Chitimacha | Atakapa |
|---|---|---|---|---|---|
| I | *ca- | ʔihk- | -t- | -ki- | hi |
| you | *či- | wihk- (M); hihk- (F) | -p- | -Ø- | n |
| s/he | *Ø- | ʔuhk- (M); tihk- (F) | -Ø- | -Ø- | ha |
| we | *po- | ʔink- | — | -kuy- | iš |
| you (pl) | *hači- | wink- (M); hink- (F) | — | -Ø- | nak- |
| they | — | sihk- (M); sink- (F) | — | -Ø- | šak- |
| reflexive | *ili- | — | -hši- | | hat- |
| reciprocal | *ixti- | ʔak- | -tahn- | — | hok- |

Stative verb subject pronouns
| gloss | Proto-Muskogean | Tunica | Natchez | Chitimacha | Atakapa |
|---|---|---|---|---|---|
| I | *ca- | ʔi- | -t- | -ki- | hi |
| you | *či- | wi- (M); hi- (F) | -p- | -Ø- | n |
| s/he | *Ø- | ʔu- (M); ti- (F) | -Ø- | -Ø- | Ø- |
| we | *po- | ʔi-n | — | -kuy- | ic- |
| you (pl) | *hači- | wi-n- (M); hi-n- (F) | — | -Ø- | — |
| they | — | si- (M); si-n- (F) | — | -Ø- | Ø- |

== See also ==
- Calusa–Tunica languages
