= John R. Swanton =

American anthropologist (1873–1958)

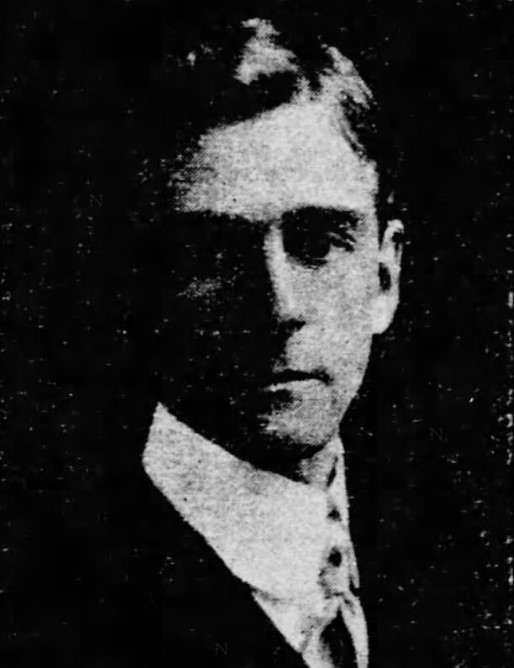
- Swanton in 1903
- Born: February 19, 1873; Gardiner, Maine, U.S.
- Died: May 2, 1958 (aged 85); Newton, Massachusetts
- Spouse: Alice M. Barnard

Academic background
- Education: Harvard University (AB, AM, PhD)
- Thesis: The Morphology of the Chinook Verb (1900)
- Influences: Frederic Ward Putnam; Franz Boas

Academic work
- Discipline: Anthropologist
- Sub-discipline: Ethnology; Folklore; Ethnohistory; Linguistics
- Institutions: Bureau of American Ethnology

John Reed Swanton (February 19, 1873 – May 2, 1958) was an American anthropologist, folklorist, and linguist who worked with Native American peoples throughout the United States. Swanton achieved recognition in the fields of ethnology and ethnohistory. He is particularly noted for his work with indigenous peoples of the Southeast and Pacific Northwest.

== Early life and education ==
Born in Gardiner, Maine, after the death of his father, Walter Scott Swanton, he was raised by his mother, Mary Olivia (née Worcester), his grandmother, and his great-aunt. From his mother, in particular, he was imbued with a gentle disposition, a concern for human justice, and a lifelong interest in the works of Emanuel Swedenborg. He was inspired to pursue history, and, more specifically, anthropology by his reading of William H. Prescott, The Conquest of Mexico. Swanton attended local schools and then entered Harvard University, earning an AB in 1896, an AM in 1897, and a PhD in 1900. His mentor at Harvard was Frederic Ward Putnam, who sent him to study linguistics with Franz Boas at Columbia University in 1898 and 1899, as he worked on his PhD dissertation, The Morphology of the Chinook Verb.

== Career ==
Within months of receiving his doctorate from Harvard, Swanton began working for the Bureau of American Ethnology of the Smithsonian Institution in Washington, D.C., at which he continued for the duration of his career, spanning more than 40 years. Swanton first did fieldwork in the Northwest. In his early career, he worked mostly with the Tlingit and Haida. He produced two extensive compilations of Haida stories and myths, and transcribed many of them into Haida. These transcriptions have served as the basis for Robert Bringhurst's translation of the poetry of Haida mythtellers Skaay and Ghandl. Swanton spent roughly a year with the Haida.

Another major study area was of the Muskogean-speaking peoples in Texas, Louisiana, and Oklahoma. Swanton published extensively on the Creek people, Chickasaw, and Choctaw. He also documented analyses about many other less well-known groups, such as the Biloxi, Ofo, and Tunica, the last of which supplemented earlier work by Albert Samuel Gatschet. He worked with Natchez speaker Watt Sam and argued in favor of including the Natchez language with the Muskogean language group.

Swanton wrote works including partial dictionaries, studies of linguistic relationships, collections of native stories, and studies of social organization. He worked with Earnest Gouge, a Creek who recorded a large number of traditional stories at Swanton's request. These materials were never published by Swanton. They have recently been published online as Creek Folktales by Earnest Gouge, in a project by The College of William and Mary which includes some of the recordings by Gouge.

Swanton also worked with the Caddo, and published briefly on the quipu system of the Inca.

== Professional affiliations ==
Swanton was one of the founding members of the Swedenborg Scientific Association in 1898. He was president of the American Anthropological Association in 1932. He also served as editor of the American Anthropological Association's flagship journal, American Anthropologist, in 1911 and from 1921 to 1923.

Swanton was also a member of the American Folklore Society, serving as its President in 1909.

== Personal life ==
Swanton married Alice M. Barnard on December 16, 1903, with whom he had three children: Mary Alice Swanton, John Reed Swanton, Jr., and Henry Allen Swanton. He died in Newton, Massachusetts, on May 2, 1958, at the age of 85.

== List of works ==
- 1898. "The Distinctness and Necessity of Swedenborg’s Scientific System", The New Philosophy, Vol. 1 No. 1, January, 1898.
- 1905. "Contributions to the Ethnology of the Haida", Publications of the Jesup North Pacific Expedition 5(1); American Museum of Natural History Memoirs 8(1). Leiden: E.J. Brill; New York: G.E. Stechert.
- 1905. "Haida Texts and Myths: Skidegate Dialect", Bureau of American Ethnology Bulletin, No. 29. Washington, D.C.: Government Printing Office.
- 1909. "Tlingit Myths and Texts", Bureau of American Ethnology Bulletin, No. 39. Smithsonian Institution; Washington, D.C.:Government Printing Office.
- 1911. "Indian Tribes of the Lower Mississippi Valley and Adjacent Coast of the Gulf of Mexico", . Bureau of American Ethnology Bulletin, No. 43. Washington, D.C.: Government Printing Office, available on Portal to North Texas Website, University of North Texas
- 1918. "An Early Account of the Choctaw Indians", American Anthropologist, Vol. 5, pp. 51–72.
- 1922. "Early History of the Creek Indians and Their Neighbors", Bureau of American Ethnology Bulletin, No. 73. Washington D.C.: Government Printing Office.
- 1927. "Religious Beliefs and Medical Practices of the Creek Indians", Forty-Second Annual Report of the Bureau of American Ethnology, pp. 639–670. Washington, D.C.: Government Printing Office.
- 1928. Emanuel Swedenborg, Prophet of the Higher Evolution : An Exposition of the Cosmic Theory Set Forth By Emanuel Swedenborg. New York: New Church Press.
- 1928. "Social Organization and the Social Usages of the Indians of the Creek Confederacy", Forty-Second Annual Report of the Bureau of American Ethnology for the Years 1924–1925, pg. 279–325. Washington, D.C. Government Printing Office.
- 1929. "Myths & Tales of the Southeastern Indians", Bureau of American Ethnology Bulletin, No. 88, Smithsonian Institution, Washington, D.C.: Government Printing Office.
- 1931. "Modern Square Grounds of the Creek Indians", Smithsonian Miscellaneous Collections, Vol. 85, No. 8., pp. 1–46 + Plates.
- 1931. "Source Material for the Social and Ceremonial Life of the Choctaw Indians", Bureau of American Ethnology Bulletin, No. 103. Washington, D.C.:Government Printing Office.
- 1942. "Source Material on the History and Ethnology of the Caddo Indians", Bureau of American Ethnology Bulletin, No. 132. Washington, D.C.:Government Printing Office.
- 1943. "The Quipu and Peruvian civilization", Bureau of American Ethnology Bulletin, No. 133. Washington, D.C.:Government Printing Office.
- 1946. The Indians of the Southeastern United States. Bureau of American Ethnology Bulletin, No. 137. Washington, D.C.: Government Printing Office.
- 1952. The Indian Tribes of North America. Smithsonian Institution Bureau of American Ethnology Bulletin, No. 145. Washington: Government Printing Office
- 1952. Swanton, "California Tribes", The Indian Tribes of North America. Smithsonian Institution Bureau of American Ethnology Bulletin, No. 145. Washington: GPO, Native American Documents Project, California State University. San Marcos, 2007

With James Owen Dorsey:

- 1912. A Dictionary of the Biloxi and Ofo Languages. Bureau of America Ethnology Bulletin, No. 47. Smithsonian Institution, Washington, D.C.:Government Printing Office.
