= Biloxi people =

Indigenous people of the Southeastern Woodlands, U.S.

Biloxi
Tanêks

Total population
- 951 self-identified (2010 Census)

Regions with significant populations
- Louisiana, Mississippi (historical)

Languages
- English, French, Spanish, Biloxi (historical)

Religion
- Biloxi religion, Protestantism, Catholicism

Related ethnic groups
- Tunica, Choctaw

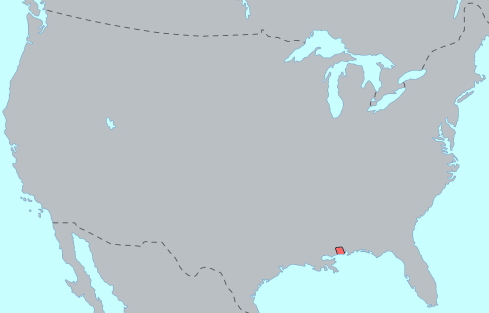
Biloxi Indians (language)

The Biloxi tribe (endonym: Tanêks(a)) are Native Americans of the Siouan-Catawban language family. When they first encountered Europeans in 1699, the Biloxi lived near the coast of the Gulf of Mexico near what is now the city of Biloxi, Mississippi. They were eventually forced west into Louisiana.

Today, remaining Biloxi people have merged with the Tunica and other remnant peoples. Together they were federally recognized in 1981; today, they are called the Tunica-Biloxi Indian Tribe and share a small reservation in Avoyelles Parish, Louisiana. Descendants of several other small historical tribes are enrolled with them. The two main tribes were from different language families: the Biloxi were Siouan-Catawban–speaking and the Tunica likely had an isolate language. Today, the tribe citizens speak English or French.

== Language ==
The Biloxi language (Tanêksąyaa ade) has been extinct since the 1930s, when the last known, Emma Jackson (Biloxi), died.

She provided information about the language in 1934. John R. Swanton and James Owen Dorsey published about the Biloxi language.

== History ==
Little is known of Biloxi history prior to their contact with Europeans in 1699. Information about the tribe has been derived from archaeological studies, oral histories recounting their traditions, and materials of related tribes.

Biloxis "were descendants of the mound-building Mississippian culture people...." Ancestors of the Biloxi shared similar cultural features with other peoples in the Southeast, what anthropologists call the Southeastern Ceremonial Complex. They were an agricultural society, in which women cultivated varieties of maize, beans, and squash. The men supplemented the agrarian diet by hunting deer, bear, and bison. They fished year round.

=== 17th and 18th centuries ===
The Biloxi encountered the French Canadian Pierre LeMoyne d'Iberville, who was establishing France's Louisiana colony. D'Iberville was told that the Biloxi nation was formerly quite numerous, but that their people were severely decimated by an epidemic of smallpox, which left an entire village abandoned and in ruins. D'Iberville described coming upon a deserted village in the late 17th century after the people had been stricken two years prior by disease. The village contained remnants of cabins made of mud, with roofs covered in tree bark. They could have contracted it from other peoples in contact with Europeans, among whom smallpox was endemic. The Native Americans had no immunity to the disease.

=== 19th century ===
The American ethnologist James Owen Dorsey visited the Biloxi in Louisiana in 1892 and 1893. According to the data he compiled, which was published in the 1912 dictionary, in traditional Biloxi culture prior to the arrival of Europeans, men wore breechcloth or breechclout, usually made of deerskin which was "passed between the legs and tucked up under a belt before and behind, with considerable to spare at either end" Belts were made of skin or of beaded cord. "Men covered the upper parts of their bodies with a garment or garments made of the skins of various animals, such as the bear, deer (particularly the male deer), panther, wildcat, beaver, otter, raccoon, squirrel, and bison. Some of these were made long, were used particularly by old people, and were intended for winter wear". As in other tribes, the women processed and sewed animal skins to create such clothing, as well as moccasins and leggings. Leggings were worn during cold weather or to protect the legs from underbrush. The lower portions of leggings were tucked under the rims of moccasins and the upper ends were usually fastened to the belt by means of straps (ibid.: 682). The Biloxi made tools and utensils from bison and deer horn, and wore ornaments of cut and polished seashells. Some Biloxi had traditional facial tattoos and wore nose- and/or earrings.

The surviving Biloxi gradually migrated from Mississippi to Louisiana and Texas. By 1806, one Biloxi village existed along the Red River and another on Lake Ayovelles. Many Biloxi migrated to Texas, with 20 families having settled along the Neches River in Texas in 1828, and in the subsequent year 65 families remained along the Red River in Louisiana. Military confrontations between the Biloxi and Texas were recorded, with a battle recorded on March 29, 1839, "near Mill Creek, five miles east of Seguin, in the Guadalupe valley," said to have occurred "between Burleson's [Texas] rangers and a motley crowd of Mexicans, runaway negroes, and Bilouxie Indians under General Cordova, in which the forces of the latter were put to utter rout, fleeing toward Mexico." Biloxi bands were reported to have established a camp on the Little River in 1846, among their last recorded mentions of a presence in Texas.

They merged with other peoples such as Caddo, Choctaw, and most recently, Tunica people. Although much of tribal structure had disappeared by the time ethnologist James Owen Dorsey visited them in Louisiana in 1892 and 1893, they still traced descent in the maternal line, in a matrilineal kinship system. Three clans were active: Ita aⁿyadi, Deer people; Oⁿʇi aⁿyadi, Bear people; and Naqotodc̷a aⁿyadi, Alligator people. Most Biloxi identified as Deer people. Dorsey described their elaborate social system, with more than 53 terms for kinship relations and a dozen which had been forgotten

Some Biloxi also joined the Mascogos in Coahuila, Mexico.

== Culture ==
As in many largely agrarian societies, control of access to granaries and storage facilities, as well as controlled distribution of their contents, led to a stratified society revolving around the Yaaxitąąyą, or "Great Sacred One," the highest ruling noble, king or queen. The Yaaxitąąyą had a cadre of lesser nobles or deputies called ixi. The Biloxi word for king or chief, ąyaaxi or yaaxi, is also the word for medicine man. Thus, the political rulers were also spiritual practitioners.

While little is known of Biloxi funeral practices among commoners, the bodies of deceased ąyaaxi were dried in fire and smoke. The preserved bodies were placed in an upright position on red poles stuck into the ground around the central interior of a temple. The deceased would be set up on a platform near the front entrance of the temple. Food would be "offered" daily by visitors.

== See also ==
- Indigenous peoples of the Southeastern Woodlands
- Mosopelea
