= Mosopelea =

Extinct Siouan ethnic group

Ofo
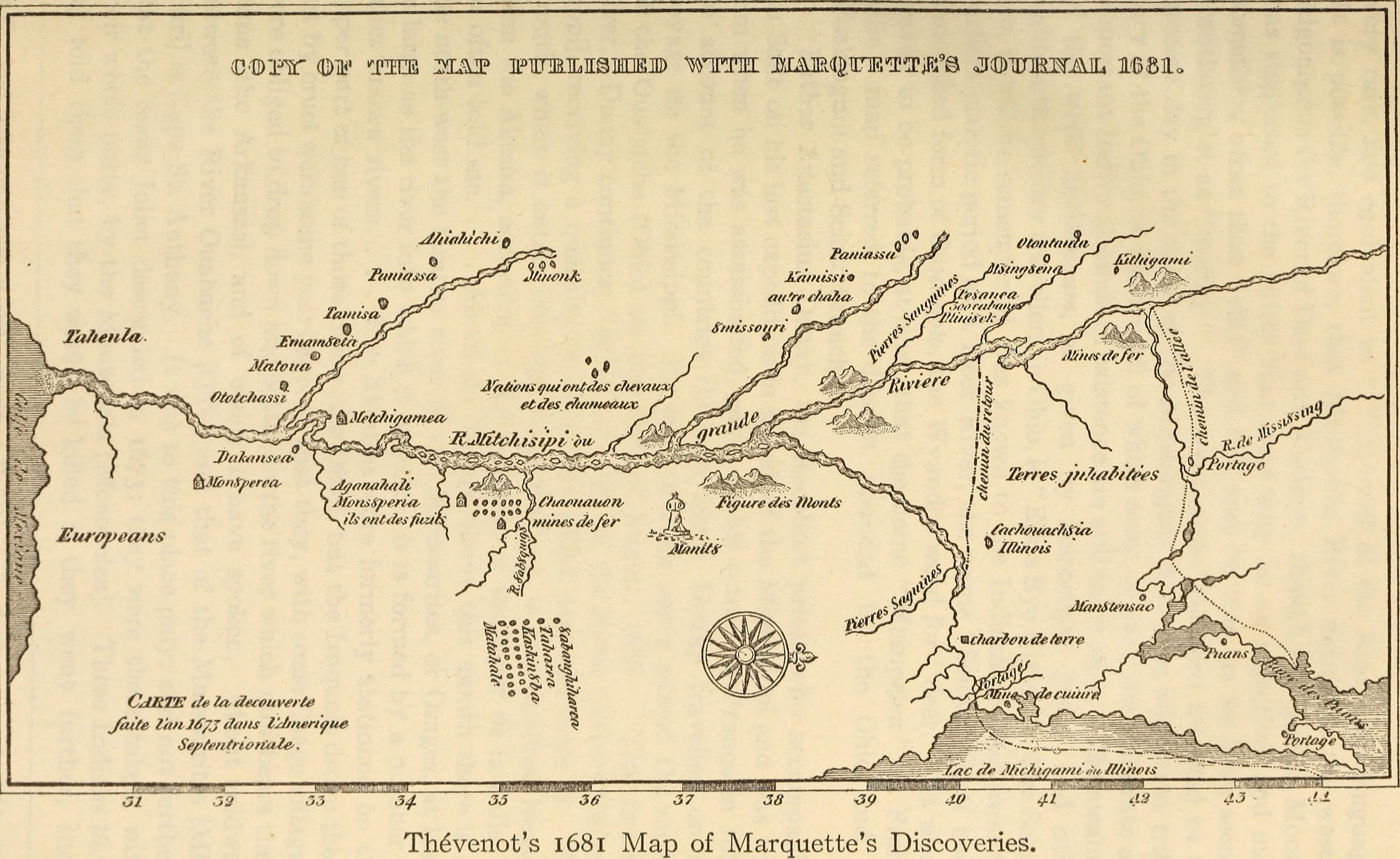
- Map depicting the location of the Mosopelea in 1681, labelled as Monsouperia

Total population
- No longer a distinct tribe, merged into the Tunica-Biloxi

Regions with significant populations
- United States (formerly Ohio, Louisiana)

Languages
- Ofo, English, French

Religion
- Native tribal religion

Related ethnic groups
- Biloxi, Tunica

The Mosopelea or Ofo (also Ofogoula) were a Native American people who historically lived near the upper Ohio River. In reaction to Haudenosaunee invasions to take control of hunting grounds in the late 17th century, they moved south to the lower Mississippi River. They finally settled in central Louisiana, where they assimilated with the Tunica and the Biloxi. They spoke the Ofo language, generally classified as a Siouan-Catawban language.

== History ==
=== 17th century ===
According to the 1684 French map of Jean-Baptiste-Louis Franquelin, the Mosopelea had eight villages just north of the Ohio River, between the Muskingum and Scioto rivers, within the present-day state of Ohio, corresponding with the heart of Ohio Hopewell country. (The Miami-Illinois name Mosopeleacipi ("river of the Mosopelea") referred to what is now called the Ohio River. Shortened in the Shawnee language, the name evolved to "Pelisipi" or "Pellissippi" and was also later applied to what is now called the Clinch River in Virginia and Tennessee.)

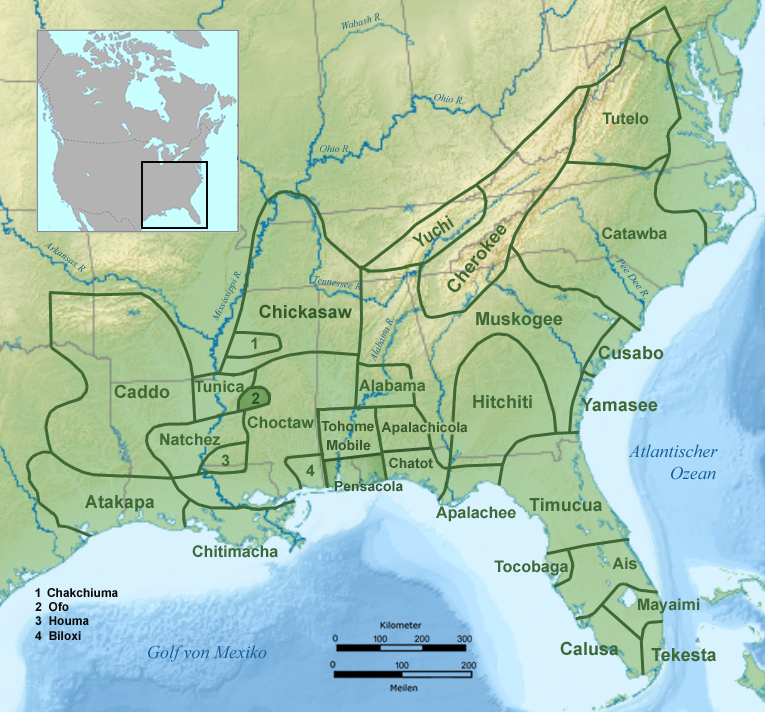
Tribal territory of Ofo during the 17th century highlighted

Franquelin noted the villages on the map as "destroyed". La Salle recorded that the Mosopelea were among the tribes conquered by the Seneca and other nations of the Haudenosaunee Confederacy in the early 1670s, during the later Beaver Wars. In 1673, Marquette, Joliet, and other early French explorers found that the Mosopelea likely abandoned Ohio and moved south along the Mississippi River. They briefly lived with the Quapaw before joining the Tunica, who were allied with the French colonists.

In 1699, the Ofo/Mosopelea were referred by French Jesuits as the Houspé, and were encountered living among the Tunica.

=== 18th century ===
Around 1700, French travelers reported Ofo villages in Mississippi on the Yazoo River. Refusing to join the Natchez in their war against the French in the 1710s and 1720s, the Ofo moved further south. They and other remnant peoples became assimilated into the Biloxi and Tunica. Their language became extinct.

== Descendants ==
Rosa Pierite, the last known speaker of Ofo, along with an unidentified girl, in 1908.

The Ofo neighboured the Tunica in 1784, and one or more Ofo families remained among the Tunica into the 19th century. Ofo descendents remain within the Tunica-Biloxi community through the family of the last known Ofo speaker, who died in 1915.

The U.S. Department of the Interior determined that: "The contemporary Tunica-Biloxi Indian Tribe is the successor of the historical Tunica, Ofo, and Avoyel tribes, and part of the Biloxi tribe. These have a documented existence back to 1698. The component tribes were allied in the 18th century and became amalgamated into one in the 19th century through common interests and outside pressures from non-Indian cultures."

The Tunica-Biloxi Indian Tribe has a reservation in Avoyelles Parish, Louisiana.
