= Moncacht-Apé =

Yazoo explorer

- Born: late 17th century present-day Mississippi
- Citizenship: Yazoo
- Occupation: explorer
- Years active: 1700
- Known for: purported transcontinental explorer

Moncacht-Apé was a Yazoo explorer from the present-day Mississippi area; in the late 17th century or early 18th century, he made the first recorded round-trip transcontinental journey across North America.

Some years after his purported journey from the Atlantic to the Pacific, Moncacht-Apé related his adventures and itinerary to Antoine-Simon Le Page du Pratz, a French explorer and ethnographer in the colony of Louisiana. Le Page published his memoir in the 1750s, including material from Moncacht-Apé's account. Moncacht-Apé said that Native people on the West Coast had told him of their ancients coming to North America by a land bridge.

A partial English translation of Le Page's book was published in 1763. As it included material about the peoples and the geography of the Louisiana area, it was taken as a guide by later European and American pioneers, including Lewis and Clark, during the continuing exploration of North America.

Some historians have disputed the fact of Moncacht-Apé's transcontinental journey. Le Page's is the only firsthand account of Moncacht-Apé's story, and its veracity is difficult to confirm.

== Le Page's account ==
In 1718, Le Page left France as part of an expedition of 800 men on three ships, arriving in the Louisiana colony later that year. There he learned the language of the Natchez, a local tribe in the area of the Mississippi River and the Natchez Bluffs. He befriended Native leaders. For most of his time in La Louisiane, where he remained until 1734, Le Page lived at a trading post at Natchez, Mississippi, explored the local territory, and observed its Native peoples. More than fifteen years after his return to France, he published a memoir of his time in America as Histoire de la Louisiane.

In his memoir, published in Paris in installments beginning in 1753, Le Page describes his attempts to uncover the history of tribes in Louisiana that, unlike the Natchez, believed that they came from far away in the northwest. Le Page inquired among the tribes for "some wise old man who could enlighten me further on this point." He was introduced to Moncacht-Apé, a member of the neighboring Yazoo tribe.

Le Page writes that Moncacht-Apé, whose name means "the killer of pain and fatigue" in his Native language, was called "the Interpreter" by the French, owing to his extensive knowledge of Native languages. Le Page's description of Moncacht-Apé as elderly at the time of their rendezvous, which almost certainly occurred before the outbreak of the Natchez War in 1729, suggests that Moncacht-Apé's journey across the continent would have taken place many years before, likely during the second half of the seventeenth century. Moncacht-Apé's travels would have predated the transcontinental Lewis and Clark Expedition, as well as Alexander Mackenzie's 1793 overland crossing of what is now western Canada, by more than a century.

== Itinerary ==
In Le Page's telling, Moncacht-Apé set out alone after the death of his family in search of the origins of his people. He first traveled northward from his native Mississippi, up the Mississippi and Ohio rivers, and eventually past Niagara Falls to the coast of the North Atlantic. From there, he retraced his steps to the Mississippi and then turned north and reached the confluence of the Mississippi and Missouri rivers, near present-day St. Louis. He followed the Missouri River to its headwaters, in what is now Montana, before crossing the Great Divide and continuing his journey westward on a waterway he says local tribes called "The Beautiful River." That river, probably a tributary of the Columbia, took him into the Pacific Northwest and eventually to the shores of the Pacific Ocean.

== Influence on later explorers ==
Later European and American explorers learned of Moncacht-Apé's travel through Le Page's book. In it, Le Page published a map based on Moncacht-Apé's itinerary; it became well-known and was compared by Denis Diderot in his Encyclopédie to charts prepared by other explorers. Lewis and Clark carried an English translation of Le Page's Historique on their expedition across the Louisiana Purchase. Moncacht-Apé's failure to mention crossing the Rocky Mountains may have inspired their overly optimistic belief that they could easily carry a boat from the headwaters of the Missouri to the westward-flowing Columbia River.

== Veracity of Le Page's account ==
A second account of Moncacht-Apé's transcontinental journey was given by Jean-François-Benjamin Dumont de Montigny, a French army officer, in Chapter 41 of his Memoirs historiques sur la Louisiane (wherein the Indian's name is given as "Moncachtabé"). Dumont published his work in 1753, just before the first installment of Le Page's Historique. But Dumont, who was acquainted with Le Page in Louisiana, attributes his story to Le Page, so both of their accounts of the exploits of Moncacht-Apé rest on the same story reported by Le Page. Dumont claimed to have known Moncacht-Apé, so many historians accept that there was such a historical person.

But they find it difficult to ascertain the quality of his account. Some historians speculate that Le Page embellished Moncacht-Apé's journey with details supplied by fur traders and Indians who had traveled into the interior of the continent, then mostly unknown to Europeans. Others argue that Le Page's account is lent credence by its rejection of claims of inaccurate contemporary geography, such as the purported "Sea of the West."

== Representation in other media ==
- Jonathan Reynolds Cronin (Hoksila Tanka in Nakota) wrote a historical novel based on Moncacht-Apé, titled Yazoo Mingo: The Journeys of Moncacht-Ape Across North America 1687-1700 (2002).
