= Tattooed Serpent =

Natchez war chief

Tattooed Serpent (died 1725) (Natchez: Obalalkabiche; French: Serpent Piqué) was the war chief of the Natchez people of Grand Village, which was located near Natchez in what is now the U.S. state of Mississippi. He and his brother, the Great Sun, allied his people with the French colonists. He was a friend of the colonist and chronicler Antoine-Simon Le Page du Pratz. Le Page du Pratz described their friendship and Tattooed Serpent's death and funeral in detail in his chronicle.

== Source of the name ==
The name Obalalkabiche (Tattooed Serpent) was traditionally adopted by the War Chief of the Natchez, who was always the younger brother of the leader, whose official title was Yak-stalchil (Great Sun). Thus, the Tattooed Serpent who died in 1725 and was a friend of Le Page du Pratz was preceded by his own maternal uncle (died 1700), who was also called Tattooed Serpent while in office. On his death in 1725, Tattooed Serpent was succeeded by his sister's second eldest son, who took the same name. As an emblem of the office, he was decorated with the elaborate tattoo of a serpent circling his body from his foot to his mouth.

== Life ==
In 1723, Tattooed Serpent helped the French negotiate a peace treaty after the Second Natchez War 1723, which ended the attacks on the French by the Natchez of the White Apple Village. He was such a friend of the French that, according to the chronicle of Dumont de Montigny, his sister, called La Glorieuse by the French, said that "he was like a Frenchman".

At his death, he and his older brother were both succeeded by much younger men. The alliance between the French and the Natchez became unstable, as the leaders of the pro-British White Apple village gained influence. This eventually led to the Natchez Massacre of 1729, and the end of amiable relations between the French and the Natchez.

== Death and funeral ==
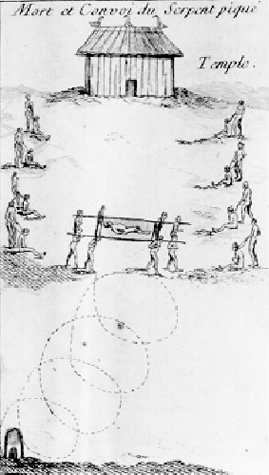
The funeral procession of Tattooed Serpent in 1725, with retainers waiting to be sacrificed

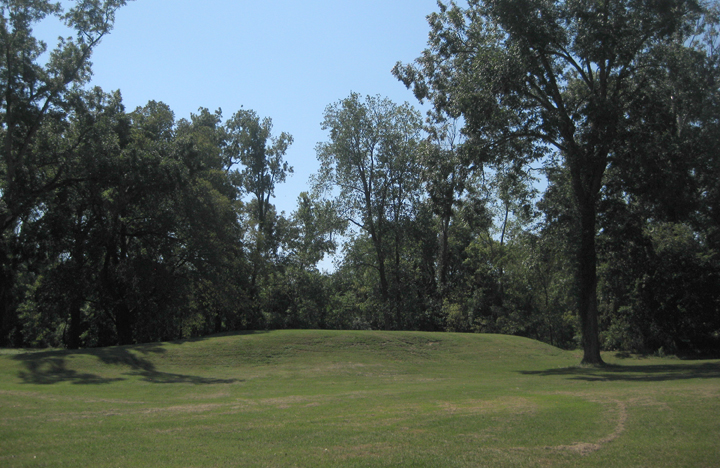
Temple mound of the Grand Village of the Natchez with plaza where the Tattooed Serpent's funeral was held

Le Page du Pratz describes in great detail the events surrounding the death of Tattooed Serpent, including his funeral. When he died, his brother, the Great Sun, was so grief-stricken that he wanted to follow his brother in death by suicide. Le Page du Pratz managed to prevent the Great Sun from doing so.

At the funeral of Tattooed Serpent, a number of commoner class servants of the War Chief were sacrificed by garrotting, following the Natchez custom. According to Le Page du Pratz, two of his wives, one of his sisters (La Glorieuse), his first warrior, his doctor, his head servant and the servant's wife, his nurse, and a craftsman of war clubs all chose to die and be interred with him, as well as several old women. An infant was sacrificed, strangled by his parents. These retainers had their faces painted red and were drugged with large doses of nicotine or Jimson weed before their deaths.

During the funeral procession, the chief's body was carried to the temple on a litter made of cane matting and cedar poles. The temple was located on top of a low platform mound. The retainers were ritually strangled at the temple.

Tattooed Serpent was buried in a trench inside the temple floor, while his retainers were buried in other locations atop the mound surrounding the temple. After a few months time, the bodies were disinterred and their defleshed bones were stored as bundle burials in the temple.

== See also ==
- Tattooed Arm
