= St. Catherine Creek =

Stream in Mississippi, U.S.

Coordinates: 31°32′08″N 91°26′51″W

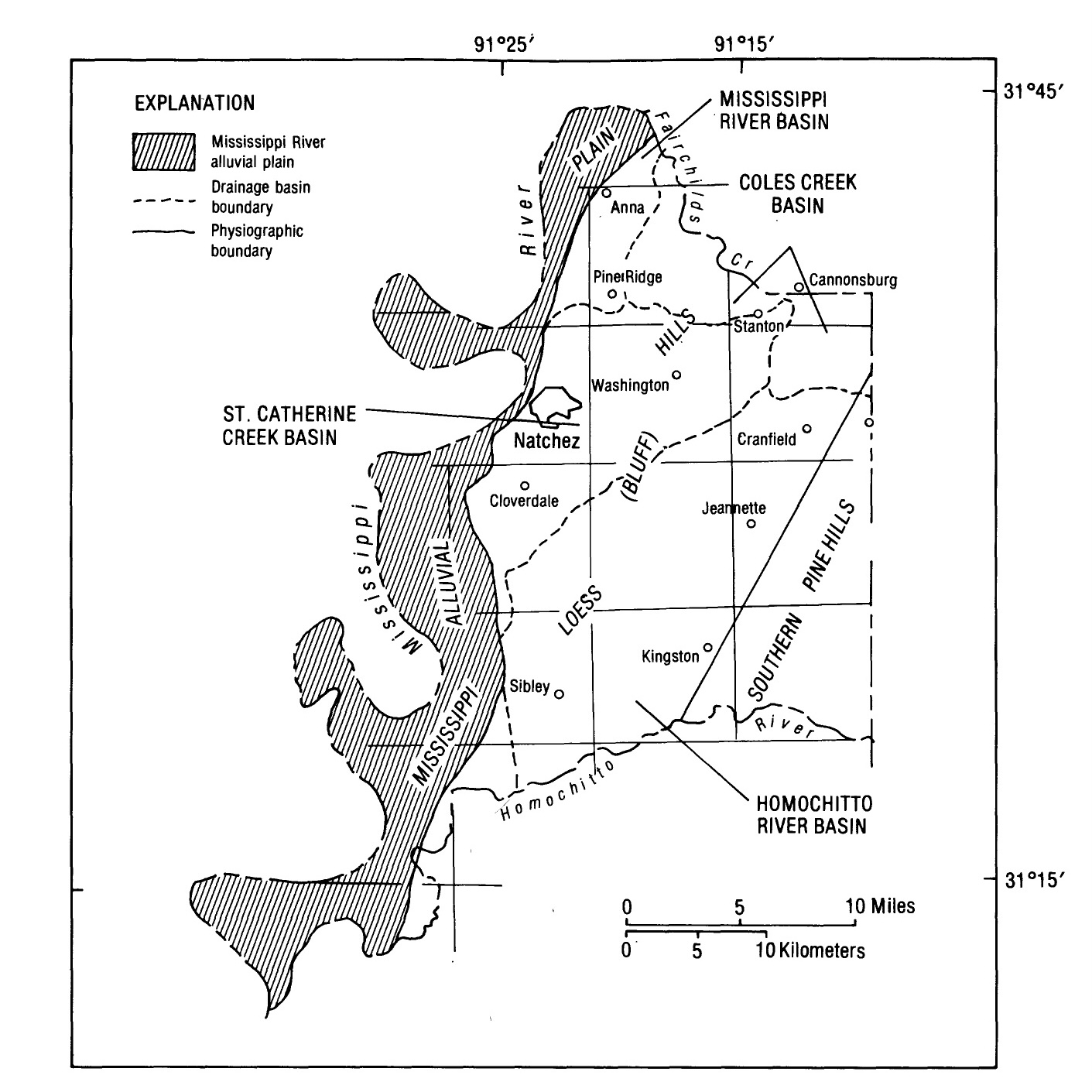
Drainage basins and physiographic districts in Adams County Mississippi

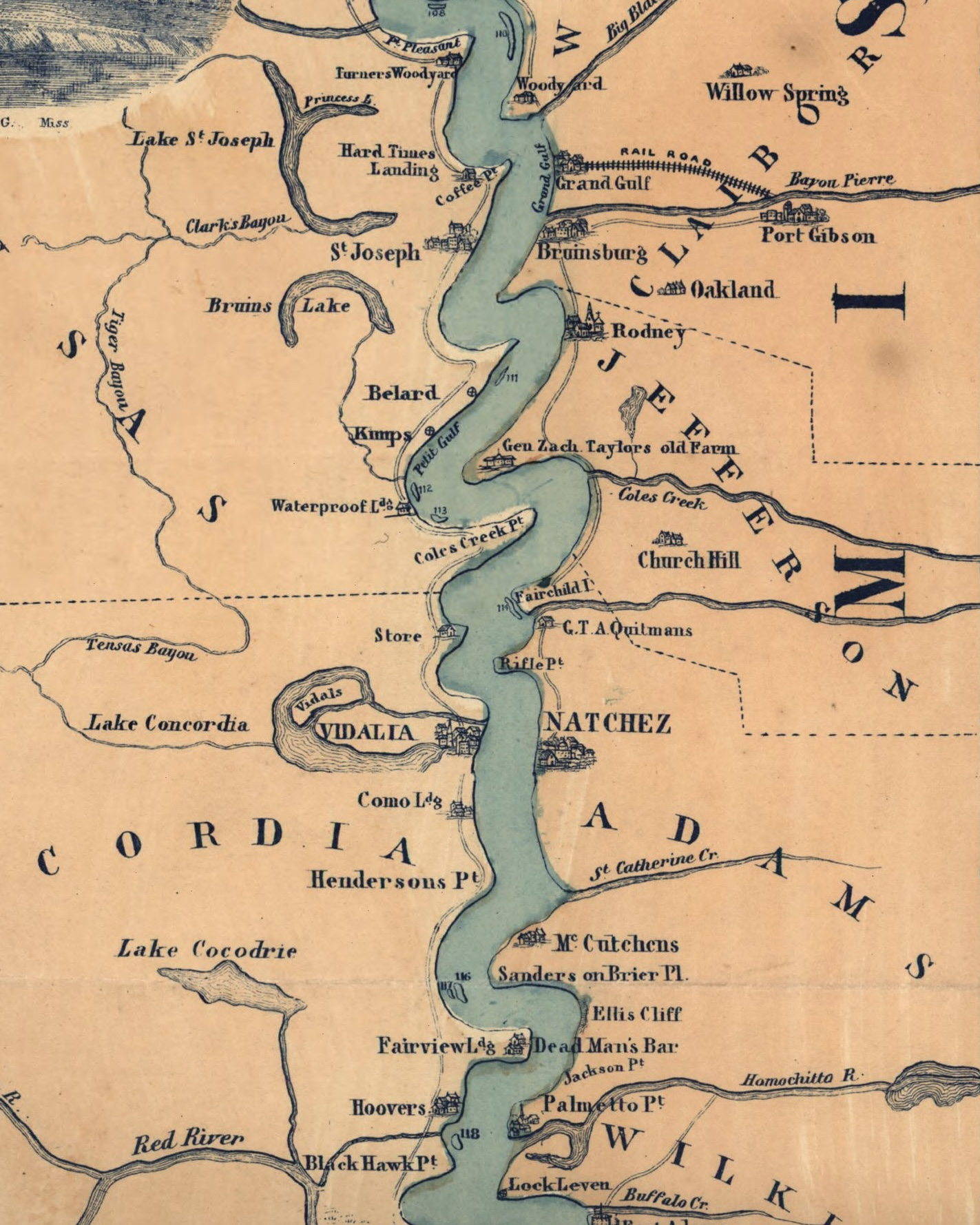
Landmarks in the vicinity of Vicksburg, Vidalia, and Natchez circa 1863

Saint Catherine Creek is a stream in Adams County, Mississippi, United States. Its principal drainage basin is in the vicinity of Natchez, Mississippi. The main village of the Natchez people was located on St. Catherine's Creek.

The first plantation in the Natchez district was established in 1718, during the French colonial era, along St. Catherine's Creek. Spanish colonial records of the Natchez District refer to Santa Catalina. The second capital of Mississippi Territory, Washington, could be reached by St. Catherine's Creek, in seasons of high water. Circa 1808, water for the village at Washington was said to be "well supplied by wells about forty feet deep, and about a quarter of a mile from the east end is a delightful spring, near the bank of St. Catherine's creek, where is a hot and cold bath—the price of bathing is three eighths of a dollar."

There was rumored to be a vein of silver at the base of the cliffs near St. Catherine's Creek but the miner who found and wanted to exploit it could not find local investors on account of their cotton being worth more than gold so why should they dabble in the less-valuable commodity of silver.

The name of the creek almost certain derives from the French: Concession de Saint Catherine commissioned in France in 1719 and planted in the New World and then extinguished by the Natchez massacre of 1729.

== See also ==
- St. Catherine Creek National Wildlife Refuge
