= Tattooed Arm =

Female Sun of Natchez people

Tattooed Arm (French: Bras Piqué; died after 1731) was the Female Sun of the Natchez people in the early 18th century.

The Natchez were matrilineal, and while the paramount chief was a man, this title was inherited through his mother, the Female Sun. Tattooed Arm was the mother of the Great Sun (in office from 1728), and the daughter of the previous female sun, "White Woman" (died 1704). She was the sister of war chief Tattooed Serpent (d. 1725) and the Great Sun (d. 1728).

Like her brothers, she was friendly to the French, and had attempted to warn them of plans by her tribe to attack them by surprise. In early 1731 the French besieged a Natchez fort in the Tensas watershed. Several hundred Natchez, mainly women and children, surrendered to the French under a false offer of amnesty. Tattooed Arm may have surrendered then, or may have stayed in the fort until escaping with almost all of the remaining defenders during a rainstorm. In any case, Tattooed Arm was later interviewed by Antoine-Simon Le Page du Pratz in New Orleans. Tattooed Arm may have been among the 291 Natchez people who were sent to the French colony of Saint-Domingue in May 1731, where they were sold as slaves.

Her original Natchez name is unknown.
