= Dumont de Montigny =

French colonial officer and farmer (1696–1760)

Jean-François-Benjamin Dumont de Montigny
- Born: 31 July 1696; Paris, France
- Died: 1760 (aged 63–64); Pondicherry, India
- Other names: Dumont de Montigny; François-Benjamin Dumont
- Occupations: Military officer, farmer, historian, autobiographer
- Known for: Writing about history and his experiences in New France in the 18th century

Jean-François-Benjamin Dumont de Montigny (31 July 1696 – 1760), or Dumont de Montigny, was a French colonial officer and farmer in French Louisiana in the 18th century. He was born in Paris, France, on July 31, 1696, and died in 1760 in Pondicherry, India. His writings about French Louisiana include a two-volume history published in 1753, as well as an epic poem and a prose memoir preserved in manuscript and published long after his death.

== Early life ==
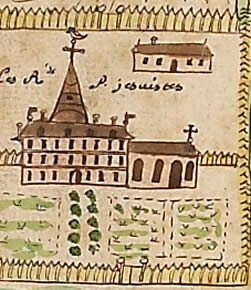
Dumont's drawing of the Jesuit Convent in New Orleans

Dumont was the youngest of six sons of Jacques François Dumont, an avocat au parlement de Paris, that is, a prominent magistrate. In surviving documents, he often signed his name as François-Benjamin Dumont, but history works and library catalogs have preserved the "Jean." The name "de Montigny" was not used by most other members of his family. At least one scholar has asserted that Dumont assumed it as a false title of nobility when living in Louisiana. But scholars have found that a niece is documented as using the same surname.

He was educated at a Jesuit collège, or grammar school, and went into the French military. Through the influence of his family, he obtained a commission in the French colonial navy, and sailed to Quebec in 1715. For two years he spent most of his time as a patient in the Hôtel-Dieu (hospital) until he sailed back to France.

== French Louisiana ==
In 1719, Dumont sailed from La Rochelle, France, to Louisiana, with a new commission as a lieutenant and engineering officer. At this time, interest and investment in the colony was strong due to the financial schemes of John Law and the Mississippi Company. Dumont was assigned to a unit of soldiers sent to develop the land grants or concessions owned by a group of rich Frenchmen including Charles Louis Auguste Fouquet, duc de Belle-Isle, an important patron and protector of Dumont's throughout his life. But in 1720, Law's financial bubble collapsed, and most investors stopped sending supplies to their concessions. As Dumont and hundreds of others lived in camps near Biloxi, Mississippi, they ran short of food and boats to transport them to concessions.

For nearly 18 years in the Louisiana colony, Dumont was assigned to forts at Yazoo and Natchez, participated in a 1722 exploration of the Arkansas River with Jean-Baptiste Bénard de la Harpe, and helped establish a concession at Pascagoula, Mississippi. He also quarreled with his superior officers, including the colonial governor, Jean-Baptiste Le Moyne, Sieur de Bienville, which led to brief periods of imprisonment.

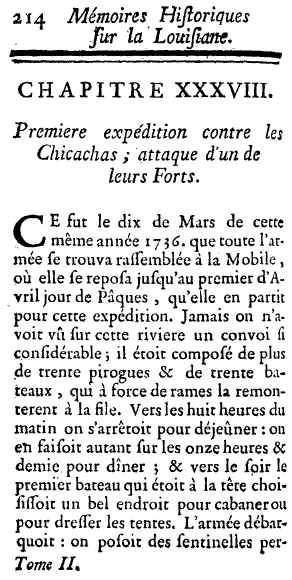
A page of Mémoires historiques sur la Louisiane

=== The Natchez Rebellion of 1729 ===
From 1726–1728, Dumont was assigned to serve at Fort Rosalie, the French post at Natchez. The rich agricultural lands in this area, on elevated bluffs safe from the annual flooding of the Mississippi River, led to high hopes among the French for tobacco plantations and other development. The local Natchez people were generally welcoming of the French, although skirmishes in 1722–1723 showed the tensions of competition for land and food. Dumont wrote that the commandant appointed for the fort in 1727, de Chépart, was a tyrant who mistreated soldiers and claimed Natchez lands for himself. Chépart's provocations led to a rebellion on November 29, 1729, in which the Natchez attacked Fort Rosalie and its surrounding settlements, killing 240 Frenchmen. The lives of women and children and most African slaves were spared, however. Among these prisoners of war was Marie Baron Roussin, whose husband Jean Roussin was killed in the revolt. Dumont had lived on their farm near the Tioux villages south of Natchez.

Dumont later wrote in his book Mémoires historiques sur la Louisiane that he left Natchez the day before the revolt. However, in his 1747 memoir, preserved today at the Newberry Library in Chicago, Illinois, Dumont wrote that he left Natchez in January 1729, months before the revolt, after escaping from a detention ordered by Chépart. Looking back at the rebellion 20 years later, Dumont and others saw it as a turning point in the history of the French colony.

=== The Chickasaw Wars ===
Following his escape from Chépart at Natchez, Dumont resigned his commission and took up life on a small farm on the Mississippi downstream from New Orleans. He married the widow Roussin. There, and later on another property within New Orleans, he supported himself as a market gardener. But he returned to a soldier's life as a member of the civilian militia during the Chickasaw Campaign of 1736. The French wished to punish Natchez Indians who had sought refuge among the Chickasaw, and prevent them from allying with the English colonists in the Carolinas. The expedition was not a success, however. In his writings, Dumont criticized the leadership of Bienville in this war as well as in a subsequent expedition in 1739–1740.

== Return to France ==
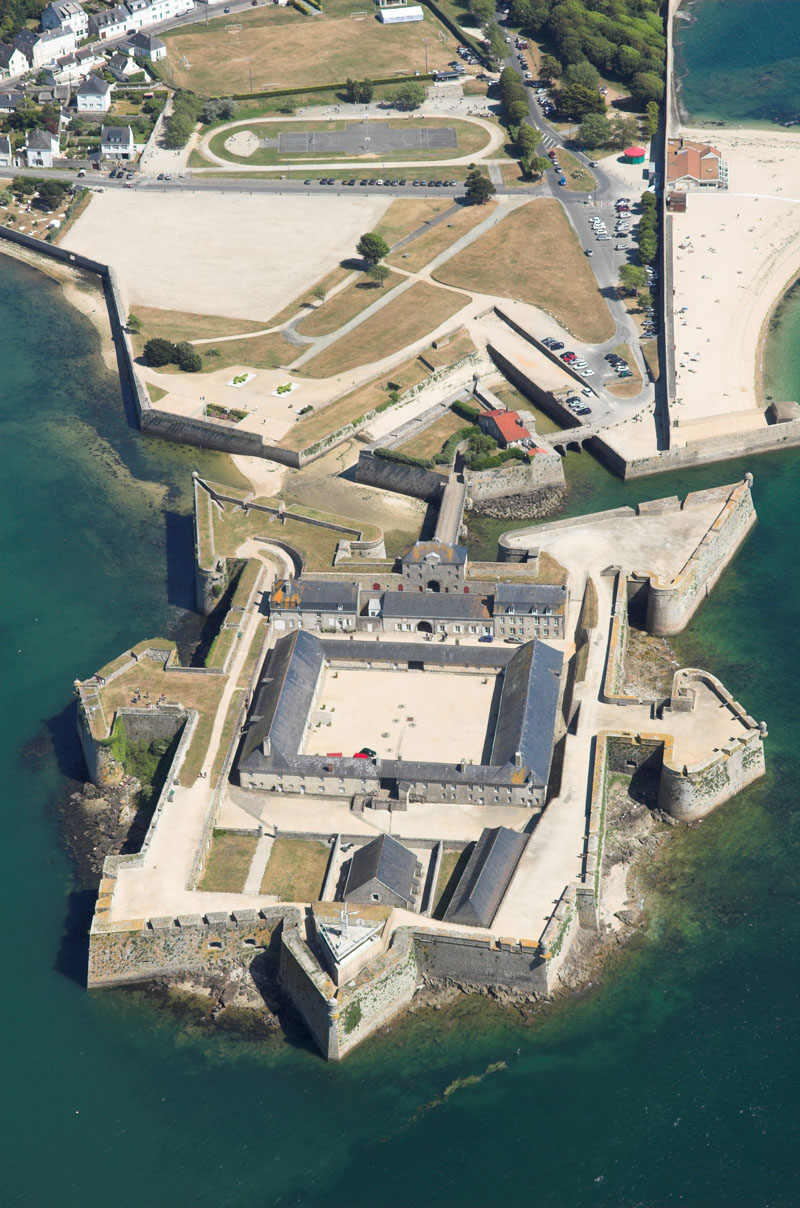
Port-Louis's citadel

In 1738, Dumont returned to France, along with his wife and two children, Marie Françoise, born November 28, 1731, and Jean-François, baptized in New Orleans on January 2, 1733. He took up residence in Port-Louis, Morbihan, the port from which he had sailed to Louisiana. As captain of the gates in the citadel of Port-Louis, he again quarreled with his superior officers. In 1747, he wrote out a 443-page memoir of his life, dedicated to Belle-Isle.

By 1750, he was back in Paris, developing a reputation as an expert on Louisiana by drawing maps and publishing essays in learned journals. It appears that he may have collaborated with Antoine-Simon Le Page du Pratz, who published a series of articles on Louisiana in the Journal Œconomique, a periodical devoted to science and commercial topics. Dumont also published two brief pieces in the journal and wrote a book about his experiences in the New World, Mémoires historiques sur la Louisane. Dumont's book relates one of the two earliest accounts of Moncacht-Apé's journey across North America; the other is in Le Page du Pratz's Histoire de la Louisiane.

After publishing his book, Dumont obtained another commission as a lieutenant in the colonial Company of the Indies, and he sailed in 1754 with his wife for Mauritius and then to Pondicherry, a French outpost in India. He died there in 1760.
