= Natchez people =

Historical Indigenous peoples of the Southeastern Woodlands

Natchez
Total population
- merged into other tribes

Regions with significant populations
- Mississippi (Natchez Bluffs), Louisiana, Oklahoma

Languages
- English, French, Natchez

Religion
- Christianity, Native religion

Related ethnic groups
- Muscogee, Cherokee

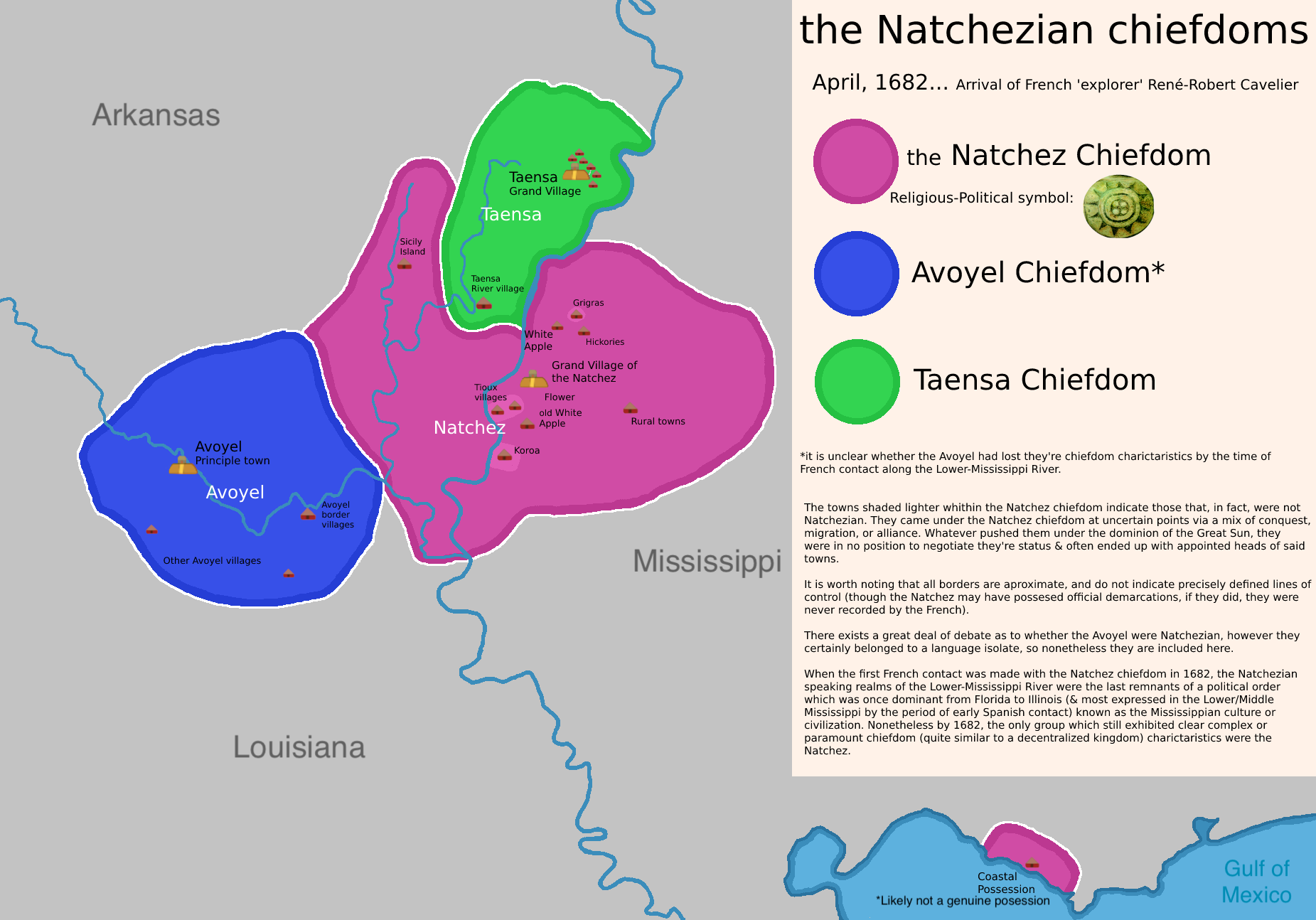
Distribution of the Natchez people and their chiefdoms in 1682

The Natchez (/ˈnætʃɪz/ NATCH-iz, Natchez pronunciation: [naːʃt͡seh]) were a Native American people who originally lived in the Natchez Bluffs area in the Lower Mississippi Valley, near the present-day city of Natchez, Mississippi, in the United States. The DeSoto chronicle failed to record their presence when they came down the river in 1543. They spoke a language with no known relatives, although it may be distantly related to the Muskogean languages of the Creek Confederacy.

The somewhat unreliable archivist Pierre Margry recorded the identity the Natchez applied to themselves as "the Theloel". An early American geographer noted in his 1797 gazetteer that they were also known as the "Sun Set Indians".

The Natchez are noted for being the only Mississippian culture with complex chiefdom characteristics to have survived long into the period of European colonization. Other Mississippian societies in the Southeast had generally experienced important transformations shortly after contact with the Spanish Empire or other settler colonists from across the ocean. The Natchez are also noted for having had an unusual social system of nobility classes and exogamous marriage practices. It was a strongly matrilineal kinship society, with descent reckoned along female lines. The paramount chief named the Great Sun was always the son of the Female Sun, whose daughter would be the mother of the next Great Sun. This ensured that the chiefdom stayed under the control of the single Sun lineage. Ethnologists have not reached consensus on how the Natchez social system originally functioned.

In 1731, after several wars with the French, the Natchez were defeated. Most of the captured survivors were shipped to Saint-Domingue and sold into slavery. Others took refuge with other tribes, such as the Chickasaw, Muscogee, and Cherokee. Today, most Natchez descendants are found in Oklahoma, where Natchez members are enrolled in the federally recognized Cherokee Nation and Muscogee (Creek) Nation.

Two state-recognized tribes in South Carolina identify as being of Natchez descent, as well as several other unrecognized organizations.

== Precontact history ==
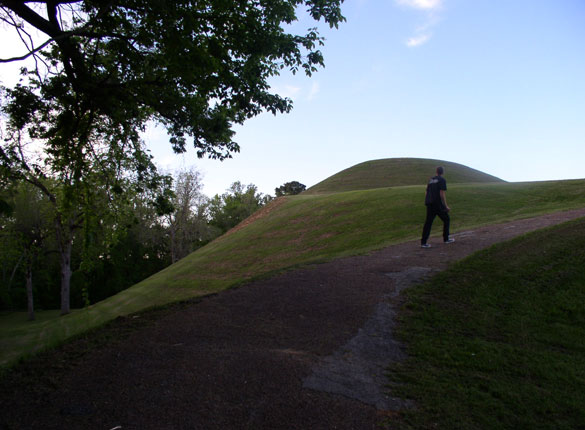
Emerald Mound

The historic Natchez were preceded in this area by what archaeologists call the Indigenous Plaquemine culture, part of the larger, precontact Mississippian culture, which extended throughout the lower Mississippi Valley and its tributaries. Its people are noted for their hierarchical communities, building complex earthworks and platform mound architecture, and intensively cultivating maize.

Archaeological evidence indicates that people of the Plaquemine culture, an elaboration of the Coles Creek culture, had lived in the Natchez Bluffs region since at least 700 CE. The Natchez Bluffs are located along the east side of the Mississippi River in present-day Mississippi. During the late precontact era, around 1500, Plaquemine-culture people occupied territory from the Big Black River in the north to the vicinity of the Homochitto River in the south. The Plaquemine people built many platform mounds, including Emerald Mound, the second-largest pre-Columbian structure in North America north of Mexico. Emerald Mound was an important ceremonial center.

The Natchez used Emerald Mound in their time, but they abandoned the site before 1700. Their center of power shifted to the Grand Village of the Natchez. The Grand Village had between three and five platform mounds. (Note: See the National Park Service web pages Emerald Mound Site and Grand Village of the Natchez Indians.)

By 1700, the Natchez occupied a territory that covered only an area roughly between Fairchilds Creek and South Fork Coles Creek in the north to St. Catherine's Creek in the south. This area is approximately that of the northern half of present-day Adams County, Mississippi.

== Protohistoric ==
The earliest European account of the Natchez may be from the journals of the Spanish expedition of Hernando de Soto. In 1542, de Soto's expedition encountered a powerful chiefdom located on the eastern bank of the Mississippi River. Native sources called it "Quigualtam", after the paramount chief's name. Various scholars have debated whether this chiefdom was the Emerald Phase (1500–1680) of the Natchez chiefdom, which was in its ascendancy at the time. The encounter was brief and violent; the natives attacked and chased the Spanish with their canoes. No further European contact with the indigenous people in this area occurred for more than 140 years, but they suffered from epidemics of infectious disease carried indirectly by other Native Americans from European traders. These and other intrusions had severely reduced the native populations. By the historic period local power had shifted to the Grand Village of the Natchez.

== French contact era ==
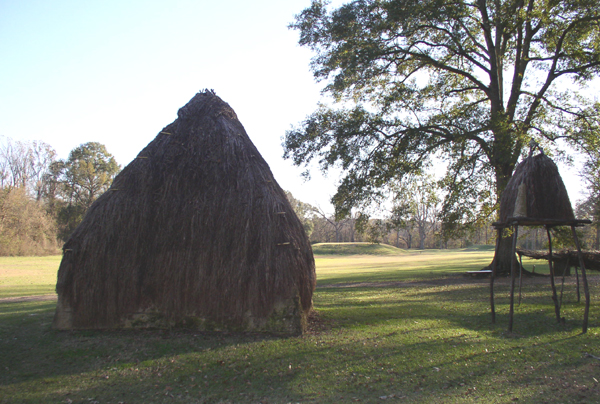
Platform mounds (in the distance) and reconstructed wattle-and-daub house at the Grand Village of the Natchez.

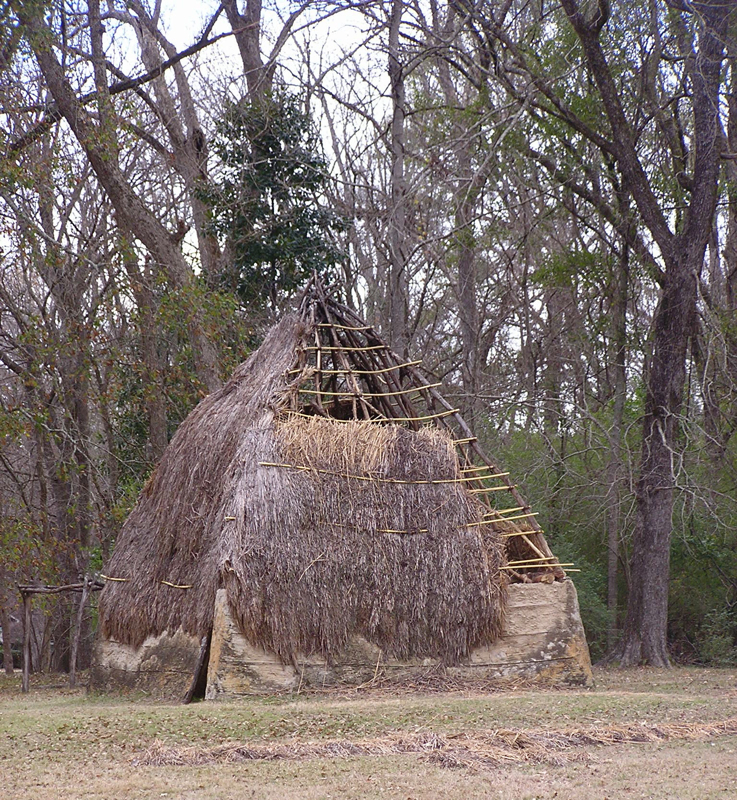
A modern reconstruction of a traditional Natchez dwelling at the Grand Village of the Natchez in Adams County, Mississippi

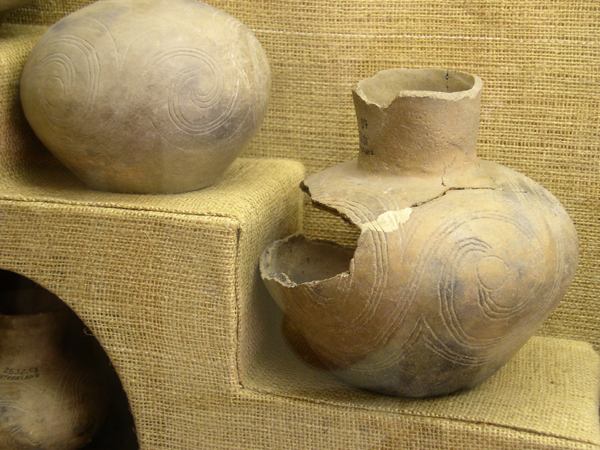
Mississippian culture pottery from the Grand Village of the Natchez historic site

The French explored the lower Mississippi River in the late 17th century. Initial French-Natchez encounters were mixed. In 1682, René-Robert Cavelier, Sieur de La Salle led an expedition down the Mississippi River. The Natchez received the party well, but when the French returned upriver, they were met by a hostile force of about 1,500 Natchez warriors and hurried away. At the time of the next French visit in the 1690s, the Natchez were welcoming and friendly. When Iberville visited the Natchez in 1700, he was given a three-day-long peace ceremony, which involved the smoking of a ceremonial pipe and a feast.

French Catholic missionaries from Canada began to settle among the Natchez in 1698. On the coast of the Gulf of Mexico, French colonists established Biloxi in 1699 and Mobile in 1702. Early French Louisiana was governed by Pierre Le Moyne d'Iberville and his brother Jean-Baptiste Le Moyne, Sieur de Bienville, among others. Both brothers played a major role in French-Natchez relations. (Note: For an overview of colonial Louisiana and French-Indian relations, see DuVal (2006))

During the early 18th century, according to French sources, the Natchez lived in six to nine village districts, with a population estimated at 4,000–6,000 people and the ability to muster 1,500 warriors. There were three village districts in the lower St. Catherine's Creek area, called Tioux, Flour, and the Grand Village of the Natchez. Three other village districts were located to the northeast, along upper St. Catherine's Creek and Fairchild's Creek, called White Apple (or White Earth), Grigra, and Jenzenaque (or Hickories). (Note: Map of historic Natchez village areas in Lorenz 2000, p. 149.) Historian James Barnett, Jr. described this dispersed leadership structure as developing in the post-epidemic years. It enabled the Natchez to maintain friendly diplomatic relations with European settlers of all nations, but eventually led to deeper internal divisions within Natchez society.

The Natchez chiefs were called Suns, and the paramount chief was called the Great Sun (Natchez: uwahšiL li∙kip). When the French arrived, the Natchez were ruled by the Great Sun and his brother, Tattooed Serpent, both hereditary positions. The Great Sun had supreme authority over civil affairs, and the Tattooed Serpent oversaw political issues of war and peace, and diplomacy with other nations. Both lived at the Grand Village of the Natchez. Lesser chiefs, mostly from the Sun royal family, presided at other Natchez villages.

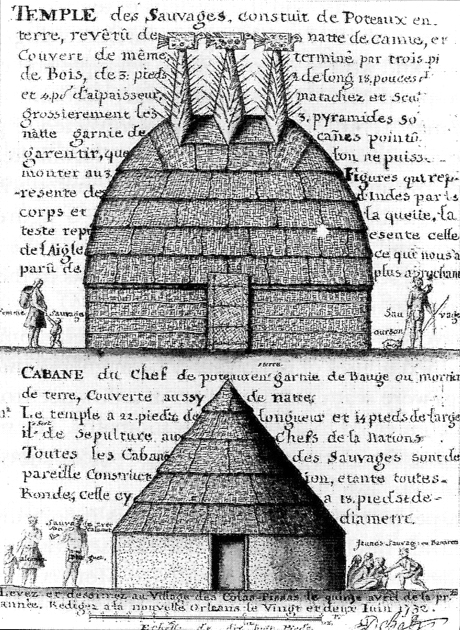
Natchez Great Temple on Mound C and the Sun Chiefs cabin, drawn by Alexandre de Batz in the 1730s

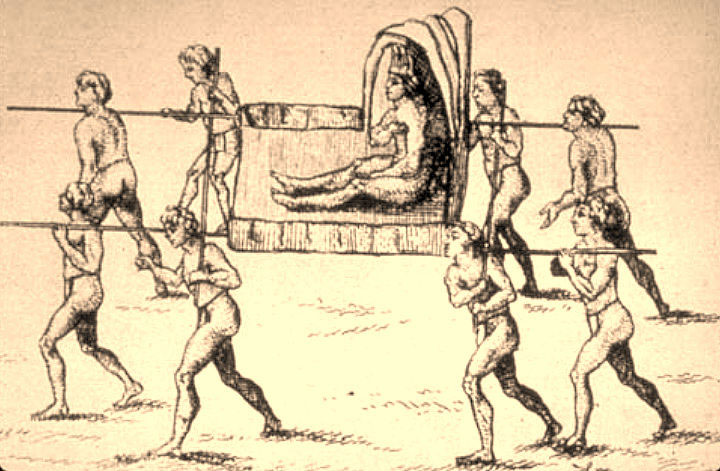
"The Great Sun, Paramount Chief of the Natchez People" in a 1758 drawing by Antoine-Simon Le Page du Pratz

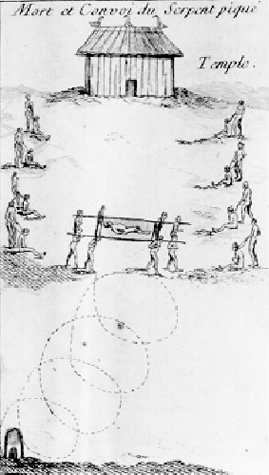
The funeral procession of Tattooed Serpent in 1725, with retainers waiting to be sacrificed from a drawing by Antoine-Simon Le Page du Pratz

The Natchez performed ritual human sacrifice upon the death of a Sun. When a male Sun died, his wives were expected to accompany him by performing ritual suicide. Great honor was associated with such sacrifice, and sometimes many Natchez chose to follow a Sun into death. For example, at the death of the Tattooed Serpent in 1725, two of his wives, one of his sisters (nicknamed La Glorieuse by the French), his first warrior, his doctor, his head servant and the servant's wife, his nurse, and a craftsman of war clubs, all chose to die with him.

Mothers sometimes sacrificed infants in such ceremonies, an act that conferred honor and special status to the mother. Relatives of adults who chose ritual suicide were likewise honored and rose in status. The practice of ritual suicide and infanticide upon the death of a chief existed among other Native Americans living along the lower Mississippi River, such as the Taensa.

During the late 17th and early 18th centuries, French colonists in the American Southeast initiated a power struggle with colonists living in the colony of Carolina. Traders from Carolina had established a large trading network among the indigenous peoples of the American Southeast, and by 1700 it stretched west as far as the Mississippi River. The Chickasaw tribe, who lived north of the Natchez, were frequently visited by Carolinian traders, thereby giving them access to firearms and alcohol. One of the most lucrative trades with Carolinian merchants involved trading in enslaved Indigenous people. For decades, the Chickasaw conducted slave raids over a wide region in the American Southeast, often being joined by allied Natchez and Yazoo warriors. These raiding parties moved over great distances to enslave people from hostile tribes. In one instance, a 1713 raiding party of Chickasaw, Natchez, and Yazoo raiders attacked the Chaouachas, an Indian tribe living near the mouth of the Mississippi River. The grand chief of the Chaouachas was killed; his wife and ten others were carried off to Carolina, where they were sold into slavery.

Although Carolinian merchants had been operating in the American Southeast for decades, French merchants rapidly established economic networks throughout the region within a few years of their arrival. Most Indian tribes in the region sought to maintain trade links with as many Europeans as possible, encouraging competition and price reductions. By the 1710s, the Natchez had become solidly integrated with the French, trading furs for firearms, blankets, alcohol, and other supplies. Despite this, the Natchez kept their markets open for all European merchants. The accelerating pace of European colonization exacerbated internal tensions within Natchez society. Several villages, led by the Grand Village of the Natchez and including the villages of Flour and Tioux, openly supported the French. Others, including White Apple, Jenzenaque, and Grigra, maintained their distance from the French and entertained the possibility of seeking alliances elsewhere. The Great Sun and Tattooed Serpent leaders lived in the Grand Village of the Natchez and were generally friendly toward the French. When violence broke out between the Natchez and the French, the village of White Apple was usually the main source of tensions, as in the Natchez revolt.

The French colonial authorities regularly described the Natchez as being ruled with absolute, despotic authority by the Great Sun and Tattooed Serpent. The existence of two opposing factions was well known and documented. The Great Sun and Tattooed Serpent repeatedly pointed out their difficulty in controlling the hostile Natchez. The White Apple faction likely functioned at least semi-independently. Whatever power the family of the Great Sun and Tattooed Serpent had over outlying villages was reduced in the late 1720s after both died. Relatively young, inexperienced leaders succeeded them. While the new Great Sun was technically the paramount chief of the Natchez, the chief of White Apple became the eldest Sun chief and had more political clout than the Great Sun. The French continued to hold the Great Sun responsible for the conduct of all Natchez villages. They insisted on dealing with the Natchez as if the people were a unified nation ruled from its capital, the Grand Village of the Natchez. (Note: An overview of the internal division in Natchez society, their role in the conflicts of the region, and the French misunderstandings of Natchez politics can be found in Lorenz 2000, pp. 158–163.)

During the 1710s and 1720s, French presence and settlement in Natchez territory increased from a handful of traders and missionaries to hundreds of settlers (some 400 French colonists and 200 enslaved Africans). They cultivated several large tobacco plantations, and maintained a military post at Fort Rosalie. French colonists often intermarried with Natchez women. At first, the Natchez welcomed the French settlers and assigned them land grants, although historians have noted it was unlikely they had the same concept of land ownership as the French.

== Conflicts with the French ==
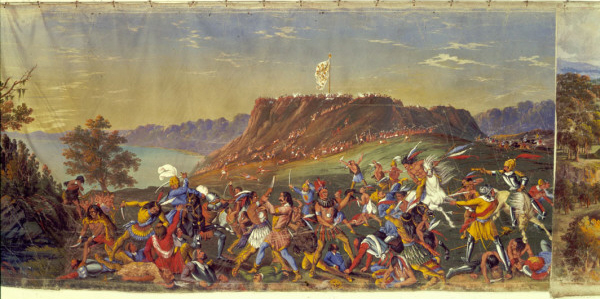
The Natchez revolt of 1729, where the Natchez slaughtered most of the French soldiers and colonists, with Fort Rosalie in the background, from a panoramic painting by John Egan, c. 1850

In the 1710s and 1720s, war broke out four times between the French and the Natchez. The French called these the First Natchez War (1716), the Second Natchez War (1722), the Third Natchez War (1723), and the Natchez Rebellion of 1729.

The last of these wars was the largest, in which the Natchez destroyed the French settlements in their territory. In retaliation, the French eventually killed or deported most of the Natchez people. Overshadowing the first three in scale and importance, the 1729 rebellion is sometimes called the Natchez War. All four conflicts involved the two opposing factions within the Natchez nation. The Great Sun's faction was generally friendly toward the French. Violence usually began in or was triggered by events among the Natchez of White Apple. In all but the last war, peace was regained largely due to the efforts of Tattooed Serpent of the Grand Village of the Natchez.

The First Natchez War of 1716 was precipitated by Natchez raiders from White Apple killing four French traders. Bienville, seeking to resolve the conflict, called a meeting of chiefs at the Grand Village of the Natchez. The assembled chiefs proclaimed their innocence and implicated the war chiefs of White Apple. The Choctaw assisted the French in fighting the 1716 Natchez War. After the 1716 Natchez War, the French built Fort Rosalie near the Grand Village of the Natchez. The present-day city of Natchez, Mississippi developed from the 1716 establishment of Fort Rosalie.

War broke out again in 1722 and 1723. Called the Second and Third Natchez Wars by the French, they were essentially two phases of a single conflict. It began in White Apple, where an argument over a debt resulted in a French trader killing one of the Natchez villagers. The French commander of Fort Rosalie reprimanded the murderer. Unsatisfied with that response, the Natchez warriors of White Apple retaliated by attacking nearby French settlements. Tattooed Serpent's diplomatic efforts helped restore peace. But within a year, Bienville led a French army into Natchez territory, intent on punishing the warriors of White Apple. Bienville demanded the surrender of a White Apple chief as recompense for the earlier Natchez attacks. Under pressure from the French and other Natchez villages, White Apple turned the chief over to the French.

== Natchez revolt in 1729 and aftermath ==
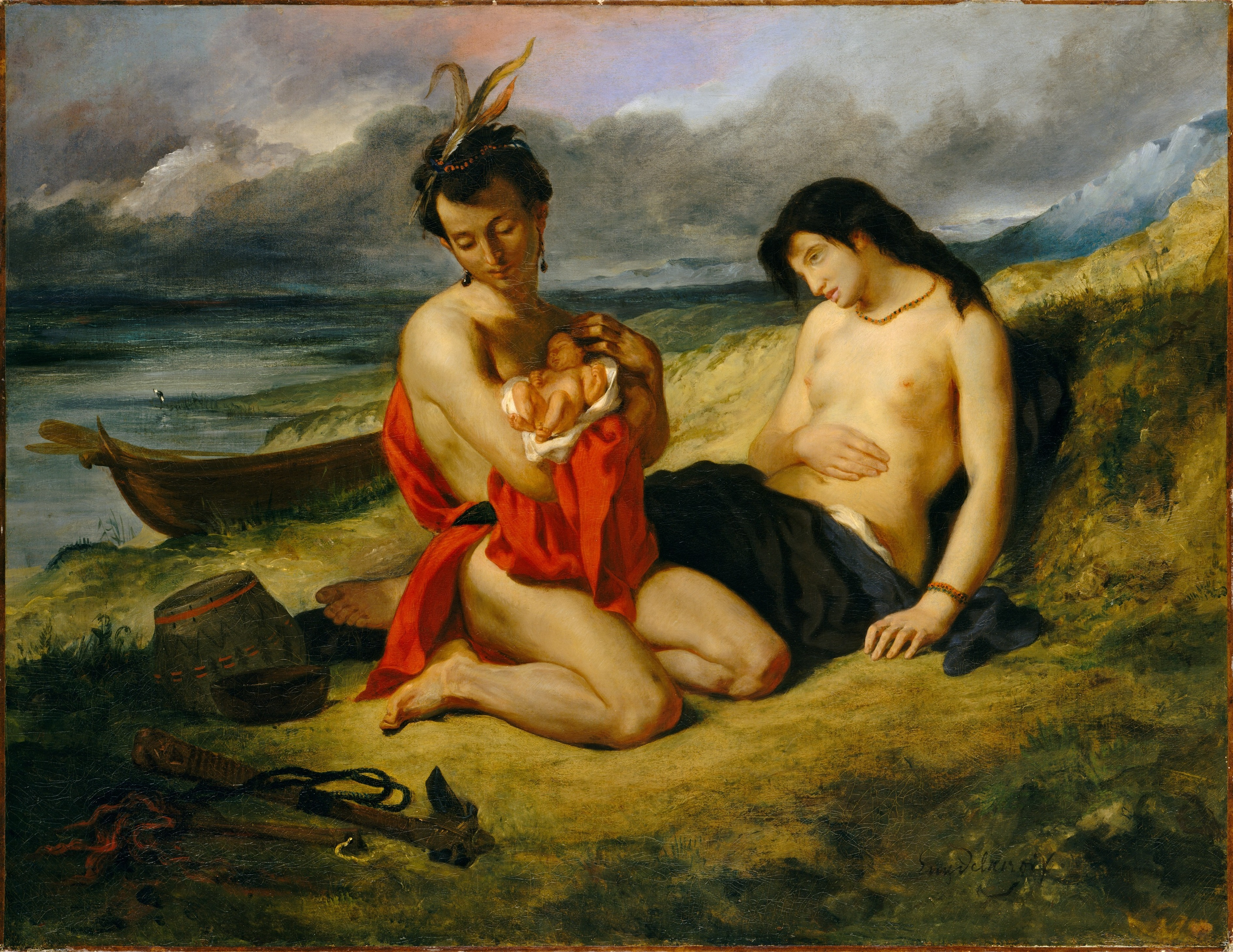
1835 oil painting by Eugène Delacroix of a Natchez mother and father with their newborn child on the banks of the Mississippi River, inspired by Chateaubriand's fictionalized account of the Natchez Wars in Louisiana

In August 1726, Étienne Perier arrived as the new governor of Louisiana with orders to further develop the Natchez settlement. Perier broke with Bienville's policy of diplomatic engagement with the Natchez and other tribes, and refused to recognize Native American ownership of their traditional lands. To oversee Fort Rosalie and the Natchez settlement, Perier appointed the Sieur de Chépart (also known as Etcheparre and Chopart), who was described by as "rapacious, haughty, and tyrannical", abusing soldiers, settlers, and the Natchez alike. Perier and Chépart entered a partnership to develop a large plantation on Natchez land.

In November 1729, Chépart announced the complete removal of the Natchez from their land in the near future and ordered them to vacate the village of White Apple so that he could use its land for a new tobacco plantation. This turned out to be the final affront to the Natchez, and they were unwilling to yield to the French demands. The chiefs of White Apple sent emissaries to potential allies, including the Yazoo, Koroa, Illinois, Chickasaw, and Choctaw. They also sent messages to the enslaved African workers on nearby French plantations, inviting them to join the Natchez in rising up to drive out the French.

On November 28, 1729, the Natchez led by Indian chief the Great Sun, attacked and destroyed the entire French settlement at Fort Rosalie, killing between 229 and 285 colonists and taking about 450 women and children captive.

After the attack on Fort Rosalie, Perier decided that the genocide of the Natchez was required to ensure the prosperity and safety of the French colony. He secured the neutrality of the Choctaw and engaged in the prosecution of the war of extermination against the Natchez.

The Natchez seized and occupied Fort Rosalie. Retaliation by the French and allied Choctaw forced the Natchez to evacuate, leaving the fort in ruins. In January 1730, the French attempted to besiege the Natchez's main fort, but they were driven off. Two days later, a force of about 500 Choctaw attacked and captured the fort, killing at least 100 Natchez, and recovered about 50 French captives and 50–100 enslaved Africans. French leaders were delighted, but surprised when the Choctaw demanded ransoms for the captives.

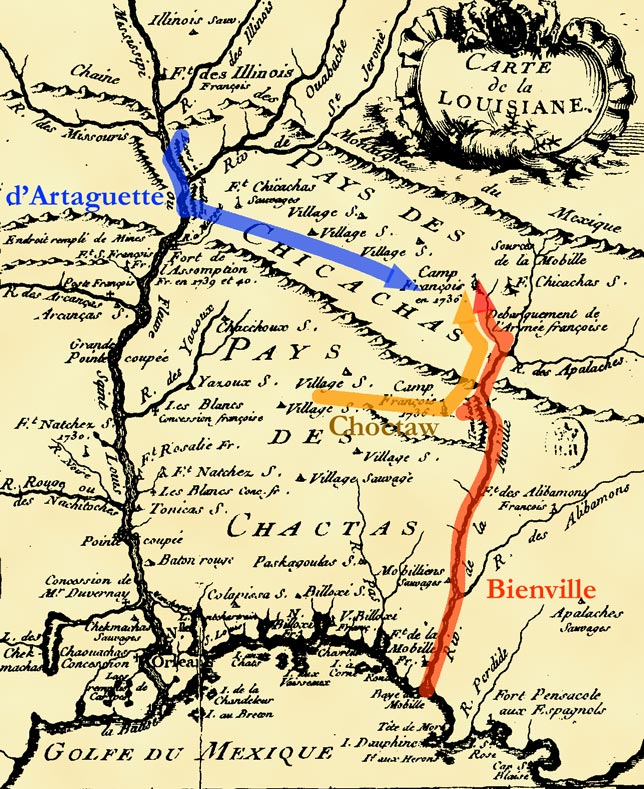
"Carte de Louisiane", from Dumont de Montigny (1753), Mémoires Historiques sur la Louisiane. Annotated to show paths of d'Artaguette and Bienville in the Chickasaw Campaign of 1736

The French and Natchez continued to attack each other until 1731. On January 21, 1731, Perier, with the troops of the colony and two battalions of marines commanded by his brother, Perier de Salvert, attacked the stronghold of the Natchez at White Apple. On the 24th, the Natchez made proposals for peace, and some chiefs met Perier, who suggested they enter a cabin that seemed deserted; as soon as they crossed its threshold, they were made prisoners by Perier. On January 25, 45 men, 450 women, and children surrendered and were taken as prisoners, but the rest of the Natchez and their chiefs escaped in the night. The next morning, only two sick men and one woman were found in the fort. Perier burned the fort, and on the 28th, the French began their withdrawal. Perier sold the chiefs, Great Sun, the Little Sun, the 45 other male prisoners, and the 450 women and children into slavery in Saint-Domingue.

Although significantly weakened by the defeat, the Natchez managed to regroup and make one last attack on the French at Fort St. Jean Baptiste in October 1731. With reinforcements from Spain and Native American allies, the French under the fort's commander Louis Juchereau de St. Denis mounted a counterattack and defeated the Natchez.

The Natchez revolt escalated into a broader regional conflict with far-reaching repercussions. The Yazoo and Koroa Indians, allied with the Natchez, suffered the same fate as the Natchez. The Tunica were initially reluctant to fight on either side. In the summer of 1730, a large group of Natchez sought refuge with the Tunica, and their request was granted. During the night, the Natchez turned on their hosts, killing 20 and plundering the town. In return, the Tunica attacked Natchez refugees throughout the 1730s and into the 1740s.

The Chickasaw tried to remain neutral, but when groups of Natchez began seeking refuge in 1730, the Chickasaw allied with the refugees against the French. By 1731, the Chickasaw had accepted many refugees. When, in 1731, the French demanded the surrender of Natchez living among them, the Chickasaw refused. French-Chickasaw relations rapidly deteriorated, resulting in the Chickasaw Wars. Some of the Natchez warriors who had found refuge among the Chickasaw joined them in fighting the French. The Natchez Wars and the Chickasaw Wars were also related to French attempts to gain free passage along the Mississippi River. During the 1736 campaign against the Chickasaw, the French demanded again that the Natchez among them be turned over. The Chickasaw, compromising, turned over several Natchez, along with some French prisoners of war.

During the 1730s and 1740s, as the French–Natchez conflict developed into a French–Chickasaw war, the Choctaw fell into internal discord. The rift between pro-French and pro-English factions within the Choctaw nation reached the point of violence and civil war.

Louisiana's Africans, both enslaved and free blacks, were also affected by the Indian wars. The Natchez had encouraged enslaved Africans to join them in rebellion. Most did not, but some did. In January 1730, a group of enslaved Africans fought off a Choctaw attack, giving the Natchez time to regroup in their forts. In June 1731, a group of enslaved Bambara, inspired by the Natchez revolt, attempted to organize a slave uprising, but French authorities disputed the Samba rebellion before they could act. More enslaved people fought for the French, however, as did some free people of color (gens de couleur libres).

Because of the contributions of the free men of color during the Natchez War, the French allowed them to join Louisiana's militias. This gave them important connections within colonial society, contributing to their achieving an independent social status between the French colonists and the enslaved people. In the 19th century, the free people of color established a relatively large class, especially in New Orleans. Many worked as highly skilled artisans; others became educated, and they established businesses and acquired property. Of French and African ancestry, the base of most Louisiana Creoles of color, they chiefly spoke French. They practiced Catholicism, while sometimes retaining ties to voodoo and African practices.

== Natchez after 1730 ==
After the war of 1729–1731, Natchez society was in flux, and the people scattered. Most survivors eventually settled among the Muscogee, Chickasaw, or with British colonists in the Thirteen Colonies. Most of the latter two Natchez groups ended up integrating with the Cherokee and Muscogee. In 1729, 480 Natchez were captured and sent to work as slaves on the sugar plantations of the Caribbean. Others probably had the same fate.

The Natchez settled mostly along the Hiwassee River in North Carolina. The main Natchez town, dating to about 1755, was located near present-day Murphy, North Carolina. Around 1740, a small group of Natchez refugees settled along a creek near the confluence of the Tellico River and the Little Tennessee River. The creek became known as Notchy Creek after the Natchez. The settlement was called Natchey Town or Natsi-yi (Cherokee for "Natchez Place"). It was the birthplace of the Cherokee leader Dragging Canoe, whose mother was Natchez and kidnapped as a young girl. In later years, Dragging Canoe's Cherokee father, Attacullaculla, lived in Natchey Town. Most of the Natchez living with the Cherokee accompanied them in the 1830s on the forced removal, the Trail of Tears to Indian Territory (later Oklahoma).

A few remained in North Carolina. Their descendants are part of the federally recognized Eastern Band of Cherokee Indians.

Most of the balance of Natchez citizens are within the Cherokee Nation (est. 185,000), the Mvskoke Nation, the Seminole Nation, and the Chickasaw Nation, with a few in the modern Choctaw Nation on their respective reservations in Oklahoma, which together cover nearly half of the state.

There are a significant number of Natchez citizens within the federally recognized Muscogee (Creek) Nation; approximately 12,000. The Natchez were constituent members of the historic Creek Confederacy and signatories on the 1790 Treaty of New York, 1796 Treaty of Colerain, and 1814 Treaty of Fort Jackson. During this time, the Natchez enjoyed signatory status and membership within the Creek Confederacy and established their town near the Coosa River in Talladega County, Alabama.

== Descendants and heritage groups ==
=== Oklahoma ===
In the early 20th century, enclaves of Natchez people lived within the Muscogee Nation and the Cherokee Nation in Oklahoma.

=== South Carolina ===
Theresa M. Hicks and Wes Taukchiray have written that small Natchez communities and settlements were historically dispersed throughout the Southeast, as far east as South Carolina, after being scattered from Mississippi by the French in 1731. They wrote that a small group of Natchez left the Cherokee and settled in what is now Colleton County, South Carolina, about six miles south of the present-day city of Walterboro in 1747. The Governor of the Province of South Carolina, James Glen, permitted this small group, composed of seven men, in addition to women and children, permission to settle near Edisto River. The group is documented to have lived between 1750 and 1763, four miles southwest of the former plantation of Thomas Eberson, within St. Bartholomew's Parish.

There are two state-recognized tribes which allege to be descended from these Natchez in South Carolina, the Edisto Natchez-Kusso Tribe of South Carolina and the Pee Dee Indian Tribe of South Carolina, which secondarily claims Natchez heritage through descent from the historic Pedee people. South Carolina additionally recognizes the Natchez Indian Tribe of South Carolina as a state-recognized heritage "Group" a legally distinct status apart from state-recognition as a tribe. All three of these entities presently lack federal acknowledgement by the Bureau of Indian Affairs.

== Language ==
The Natchez language is generally considered a language isolate. As originally proposed by John Swanton in the early 20th century, some scholars believe that it may be related to the Muskogean languages. Its last fluent speakers, Watt Sam and Nancy Raven, died in 1944 and 1957, respectively. In the 21st century, some Natchez descendants are working to revive it as a spoken language.

== Descent system ==
The Natchez were noted for having an unusual social system of noble classes and exogamous marriage. Members of the highest ranking class, called Suns, are thought to have been required to marry only members of the lowest commoner class, called Stinkards or commoners. The Natchez descent system has received extensive academic study. Scholars debate how the system functioned before the 1730 diaspora, and the topic has generated controversy. (Note: See the section titled "Natchez Descent System" in Lorenz 2000.)

Primary source documentation on the pre-1730 Natchez kinship and descent system is based on the records of a relatively small number of French colonists who documented Natchez social life between about 1700 and 1730. Fragmentary and ambiguous, the French accounts are the only historical accounts of Natchez society before 1730. Natchez oral traditions have also been studied. The first modern ethnographic study was done by John R. Swanton in 1911. Swanton's interpretations and conclusions are still generally accepted and widely cited. Later researchers have addressed various problems with Swanton's interpretation. Some researchers have proposed modifications of Swanton's model, while others have rejected most of it.

In Swanton's interpretation, social status among the Natchez was divided into two major categories, commoners and nobility. The nobility was further divided into three classes (or castes) called Suns, Nobles, and Honored People. Noble exogamy was practiced, meaning that members of the noble classes could marry only commoners. A person's social status and class were determined matrilineally. That is, the children of female Suns, Nobles, or Honoreds were born into the status of their mothers. However, the children of male Suns and Nobles did not take on commoner status from their mothers, as noble exogamy and matrilineal descent would appear to dictate, but rather were ranked one class below their fathers. In other words, children of male Suns became Nobles, while children of male Nobles became Honored, according to Swanton.

Many later researchers have focused on the so-called "Natchez Paradox" that Swanton's model is said to engender. The paradox is that if the rules described were followed strictly, over time, the commoner class would become depleted, while the lower nobility classes would grow larger.

Three general changes to Swanton's interpretation have been proposed to address the Natchez Paradox.

First, a form of asymmetrical descent may have been practiced, in which only male children of male nobility inherited the social class one step below their fathers. In contrast, female children of male nobles inherited their mothers' commoner status through matrilineal descent. Related to this is the idea that the Honored category was not a social class but rather an honorific title given to commoner men, and that it was not hereditary.

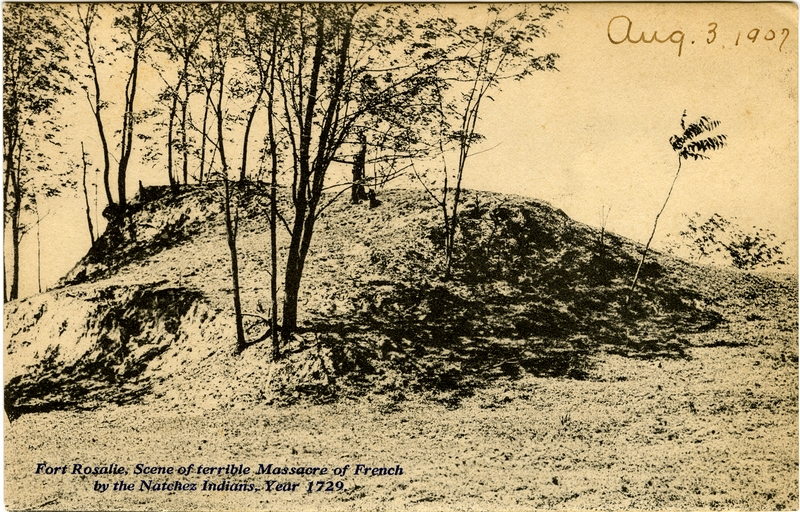
Postcard of Fort Rosalie, 1907

Second, the assimilation of foreign people, such as groups of Timucua, could have at least delayed the Natchez Paradox's effects. Researchers who argue for this idea often couple it with the proposal that the Natchez system of noble exogamy in the early 18th century was a relatively recent development in their society. According to this argument, during the relatively chaotic 16th and 17th centuries, the Natchez maintained their traditional social system by adapting it to new conditions. They assimilated foreigners as commoners and made a new requirement of noble exogamy.

Third, the social classes described by Swanton were not classes or castes, as the terms are generally used in English, but exogamous ranked clans or moieties, with patterns of descent common to most Native peoples of the American southeast. Tribes such as the Chickasaw, Creek, Timucua, Caddo, and Apalachee were organized into ranked clans, with the requirement that one cannot marry within one's clan. Related to this theory is the idea that Honored status was not a class or a clan, but a title. Sun status, likewise, may not have been a class but rather a term for the royal family. If true, Natchez society would have consisted of just two groups: commoners and nobles. The requirement of exogamy may have applied to the Suns only, rather than the entire nobility.

Some researchers argue that the prohibition against Suns' marrying Suns was largely a matter of incest taboo. In the early 18th century, all the Suns of a given generation appear to have been related within three degrees of consanguinity (siblings, first cousins, and second cousins). The custom of Suns' marrying commoners rather than Nobles may have been a preference rather than a requirement. Finally, while Swanton's interpretation claims that Nobles were also required to marry commoners, later researchers have questioned this idea. They have noted in particular a mistranslation of the primary sources and a misreading by Swanton. In other words, it could be that exogamous marriage was required only of Suns, and this requirement may have been mainly a result of the taboo against incest. (Note: An overview of these three general modifications of Swanton's system can be found in Lorenz 2000, pp. 152–155.)

Lorenz proposes that the entire kinship system was not based on classes, castes, or clans, but rather degrees of genealogical separation from the ruling Sun matriline. Lorenz's interpretation does not include asymmetrical descent or noble exogamy. Rather, a person was a Sun if they were within three degrees of matrilateral separation from the ruling matriline's eldest female Sun (called the "White Woman"). Nobles were those people who were four, five, or six degrees removed from the White Woman, while people seven degrees or more removed were commoners. In this system, the male children of male ruling Suns would naturally descend one "class" per generation, and would be required to marry outside the "class" to avoid incest. The only exception was the case of a male child of a male Noble, who acquired the Honored title by birth.

Many researchers agree that the Honored group was not a noble class but rather a title of prestige given to commoner men for acts of valor in war, or to commoner women who ritually sacrificed their babies upon the death of a Sun as part of funeral and mourning practices. In addition, people of Honored status could be promoted to Nobles for meritorious deeds.

== Ethnobotany ==
The Natchez gave Potentilla canadensis as a drug to those who are believed to be bewitched.

== Notable people ==
- Tattooed Arm, 18th-century female Sun (mother of a Great Sun)
- Tattooed Serpent (died 1725), war chief
- William Harjo LoneFight (Muscogee/Natchez, born 1966), president and CEO of American Native Services
- Nancy Raven (Cherokee/Natchez, ca. 1850–1930s) storyteller, cultural historian, one of the last native speakers of Natchez
- Archie Sam (United Keetoowah Band Cherokee/Natchez/Muscogee, 1914–1986), traditionalist, scholar, and stomp dance leader
- Watt Sam (Cherokee/Natchez, ca. 1857–1930s), medicine man, cultural historian, one of the last native speakers of Natchez
- Marguerite Scypion (ca. 1770s–after 1836), enslaved in Saint Louis, Missouri but won a freedom suit in a state court after a 30-year fight, based on descent from a Natchez mother after the Spanish had banned trade in enslaved Indians (1764)
- Tommy Wildcat (Cherokee Nation/Muscogee/Natchez, born 1967), traditionalist, flutist, cultural historian

== See also ==
- Avoyel
- Hernando de Soto Expedition
- Taensa
- History of the Tunica people
