= Natchez Indian Tribe of South Carolina =

State recognized group in South Carolina

- Official logo of the Natchez Indian Tribe of South Carolina
- Formation: December 19, 2000; 25 years ago
- Founder: Samuel E. Davis
- Founded at: Columbia, SC
- Type: Nonprofit
- Headquarters: Columbia, SC
- Members: 120 (2007)
- Official language: English
- Leader: Steve Davis, Chief

The Natchez Indian Tribe of South Carolina or Eastern Band of Natchez is a nonprofit organization and "state-recognized group" not to be confused with a state-recognized tribe. The state of South Carolina gave them the state-recognized group and special interest organization designation under the SC Code Section 1-31-40 (A) (7)(10), Statutory Authority Chapter 139 (100-111) in 2007.

The Natchez Indian Tribe of South Carolina claims descent from the Pee Dee and a group of Natchez who sought refuge along the Edisto River in South Carolina after being driven from their homelands near present-day Louisiana during the 18th century.

== Headquarters and purpose ==
The organization is headquartered in Columbia, South Carolina and maintains family ties in Orangeburg County with many members still living there and in other areas of the state. Previously called the Natchez-Pee Dee Indian Tribe of Orangeburg County, the group was originally led by Samuel E. "Redhawk" Davis until he died in 2011. Today, the group is led by Steve Davis. Members of the group take part in educational and cultural demonstrations to educate the general public about Native American lifeways and preserve their ancestral culture. The organization holds annual tribal gatherings in South Carolina and also attends an annual homecoming held each March in Natchez, Mississippi .

== Recognition status ==
South Carolina recognizes "Tribes", "Groups", and "Special Interest Organizations". "State Recognized Groups" are defined by South Carolina law as meaning "a number of individuals assembled together, which have different characteristics, interests and behaviors that do not denote a separate ethnic and cultural heritage today, as they once did. This group is composed of both Native American Indians and other ethnic races. They are not all related to one another by blood. A tribal council and governmental authority unique to Native American Indians govern them". While still called the Natchez-Pee Dee Tribe, the organization filed for state recognition as a "Tribe" in 2005. In the fall of that year, the South Carolina Commission for Minority Affairs review committee made the decision to withdraw the Natchez Tribe of South Carolina's petition and allow the organization to resubmit at a later date. In 2006 the organization reapplied for state recognition as a "Group" and achieved this official designation on February 2, 2007.

== Other activities ==
Former Chief Samuel E. Davis established the Natchez Community Headstone Restoration Project (NCHRP) in 2005 to offer assistance to low-income families throughout South Carolina by helping restore, repair, or provide headstones for their recently deceased relatives.

== See also ==
- Natchez people
- Brass Ankles
- Cherokee heritage groups
