= Samba rebellion =

Slave revolt in Louisiana

The Samba rebellion was a purported slave rebellion, described by the French historian Antoine-Simon Le Page du Pratz in his Histoire de la Louisiane. The revolt is said to have taken place in 1731, in what was then French Louisiana. Contemporary with the Natchez revolt, it was personified to its alleged leader, an enslaved man called "Samba Bambara" (a member of the Bambara people from West Africa). While Le Page du Pratz gives a brief recollection of the events, which was more a conspiracy to revolt rather than an actual revolt, his information is not verified by any existent official documents.

The African-born Samba is reported to have participated in a number of revolts after being enslaved in Africa and during transit to Louisiana. He is also presented by Le Page du Pratz as having served the French as an interpreter and a slave overseer. The insurrection was due to take place in June 1731, but is said to have been revealed to the colonial authorities after an argument between an enslaved woman and a drunken French marine. Le Page du Pratz claimed to have participated in arresting the conspirators. While Samba refused to reveal any information even under torture, eight other slaves did confess to the conspiracy. The accused were publicly executed on the Place d'Armes, Jackson Square in New Orleans, on the orders of Gov. Étienne Perier. The sole woman involved was hanged, while the men were killed by use of a breaking wheel.

In 1936, the National Association for the Advancement of Colored People's magazine The Crisis published an article claiming that the Samba planned to kill all the whites and to keep enslaved non-Bambara Africans. Later scholarship has questioned the details about the revolt, including whether Samba had participated in prior uprisings and if the Bambara were as homogenous of a group as the contemporary reports implied.

== See also ==
- History of slavery
- Atlantic slave trade
- 1733 slave insurrection on St. John
