= Antoine-Simon Le Page du Pratz =

French historian and ethnographer

Antoine-Simon Le Page du Pratz (1695?–1775) was a French ethnographer, historian, and naturalist who is best known for his Histoire de la Louisiane. It was first published in twelve installments from 1751 to 1753 in the Journal Economique, then completely in three volumes in Paris in 1758. After their victory in the Seven Years' War, the British published part of it in translation in 1763. It has never been fully translated into English.

The memoir recounts Le Page's years in the Louisiana colony from 1718 to 1734, when he learned the Natchez language and befriended native leaders. He gives lengthy descriptions of Natchez society and its culture, including the funeral rituals associated with the 1725 death of Tattooed Serpent, the second-highest ranking chief among the people.

It also includes his account of Moncacht-Apé, a Yazoo explorer who told him of completing travel to the Pacific Coast and back, likely in the late 17th or early 18th century. Through this traveler, Le Page learned of oral traditions held by indigenous people of the West Coast. They told of the first Native Americans reaching North America by a land bridge from Asia. Le Page's book was carried as a guide by the Lewis and Clark Expedition as it explored the Louisiana Purchase starting in 1804.

== Early life ==
Le Page Du Pratz was born in 1695 either in the Netherlands or France, and was raised in the latter country. He was educated, graduating from a French cours de mathematiques, and identified as an engineer and professional architect. Serving with King Louis XIV's dragoons in the French Army, he entered conflict in Germany in 1713 during the War of the Spanish Succession.

On 25 May 1718, Le Page left La Rochelle, France, with 800 men on one of three ships bound for Louisiana. He arrived on 25 August 1718. Le Page lived in La Louisiane from 1718 to 1734; about half of the period, 1720 to 1728, he lived near Fort Rosalie and Natchez on the Mississippi River. He had land and cultivated tobacco; in New Orleans he had bought two slaves, as well as a Chitimacha woman as a companion. She likely bore his children. In Natchez, he learned the language of the Natchez people, whose homeland this was, and befriended local native leaders.

When Le Page wrote his memoir more than a decade after returning to France, he used the verbatim words of many of his Native informants, rather than describing the "manners and customs of the Indians" in the detached fashion of so many later colonial authors. Because of his own interest in the origins of Native Americans, Le Page was especially attentive to the account by the Yazoo explorer Moncacht-Apé. He had traveled to the Pacific coast and back (a century before the later Lewis and Clark Expedition sponsored by the young United States). Le Page devoted three entire chapters to the Yazoo man's account of his travels. Moncacht-Apé was curious about the origins of his people and traveled to learn more. When he reached the Pacific coast, Moncacht-Apé heard Native oral histories that referred to an ancient land bridge from Asia.

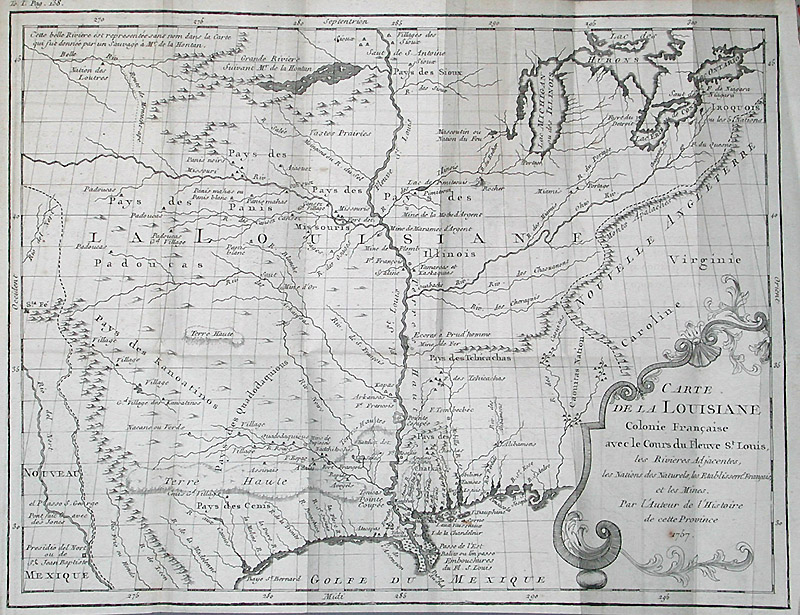
Carte de la Louisiane, or Map of Louisiana, Histoire de la Louisiane (1757)

Le Page lived at Natchez from 1720 to 1728 under the colonization scheme organized by John Law and the Company of the Indies. His familiarity with the local Natchez, and knowledge of their language and customs, is the basis for some of the unique aspects of his writings. He returned to New Orleans in 1728 to take an appointment as manager of the company's plantation across from the river from the city; he managed 200 slaves in the cultivation of tobacco. By this move, he avoided being killed in the Natchez revolt of 1729. Tensions and retaliatory attacks had escalated as European settlers encroached on Indian territory.

During the uprising by the Natchez, Chickasaw, and Yazoo, which Le Page described in detail, the Natives destroyed Fort Rosalie and killed nearly all of the male French colonists there. The Native Americans did not kill enslaved Africans or French women and children, whom they took as captives.

After the massacre, King Louis XV of France ended the concession of the Company of the Indies and seized control of the plantation which Le Page was managing. The French Army, bolstered by Indian allies, retaliated and attacked, putting down the Natchez Rebellion by 1731. They sold several hundred captive Indians into slavery and transported them to their colony of Saint-Domingue in the Caribbean, which was developed by slave labor for sugar cane plantations. Le Page du Pratz also wrote about the supposed Samba rebellion of 1731, in which he allegedly participated in arresting the conspiratorial slaves.

== Writings ==
Le Page du Pratz waited more than fifteen years after his return to France before he wrote and published his memoir of Louisiana. The Memoire sur la Louisiane was published by installments between September 1751 and February 1753 in the Journal Oeconomique (Economic Journal), a Paris periodical devoted to scientific and commercial topics. In 1758, the three octavo volumes of the Histoire de la Louisiane were published. Part of the book was devoted to his ethnographic descriptions of the Native peoples of Louisiana, particularly the Natchez. His account included descriptions of the funeral of the Tattooed Serpent, the second-highest ranking chief, with drawings of the funeral procession and people offering themselves for sacrifice. Other sections described the history of the colony, from the Spanish and French explorers of the sixteenth and seventeenth centuries through establishment of the French settlements along the Mississippi.

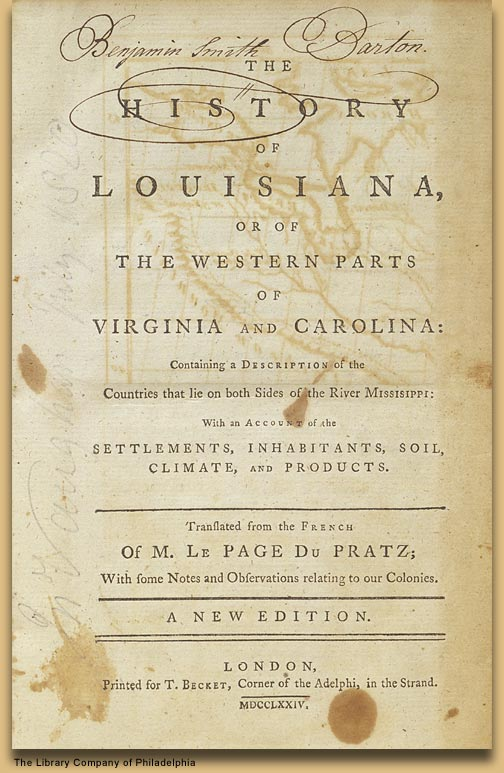
The title page to the one-volume English-language edition of 1774 which Benjamin Smith Barton loaned to Meriwether Lewis to take on the expedition of 1804–06.

In 1763, after the British had defeated France in the Seven Years' War, an English translation of part of Le Page du Pratz's work was published in London. The publishers changed the title, releasing it as The History of Louisiana, or of the Western Parts of Virginia and Carolina. This appeared to subordinate the former French colony to its British neighbors to the east, which had essentially claimed all lands west of each colony. The preface asserted that the British "nation may now reap some advantages from those countries... by learning from the experience of others, what they do or are likely to produce, that may turn to account." The Lewis and Clark Expedition believed Le Page's work important enough to include among the guides which they took on their two-year journey beginning in 1804.
