= Fort Rosalie =

United States historic place in Mississippi

- U.S. Historic district – Contributing property
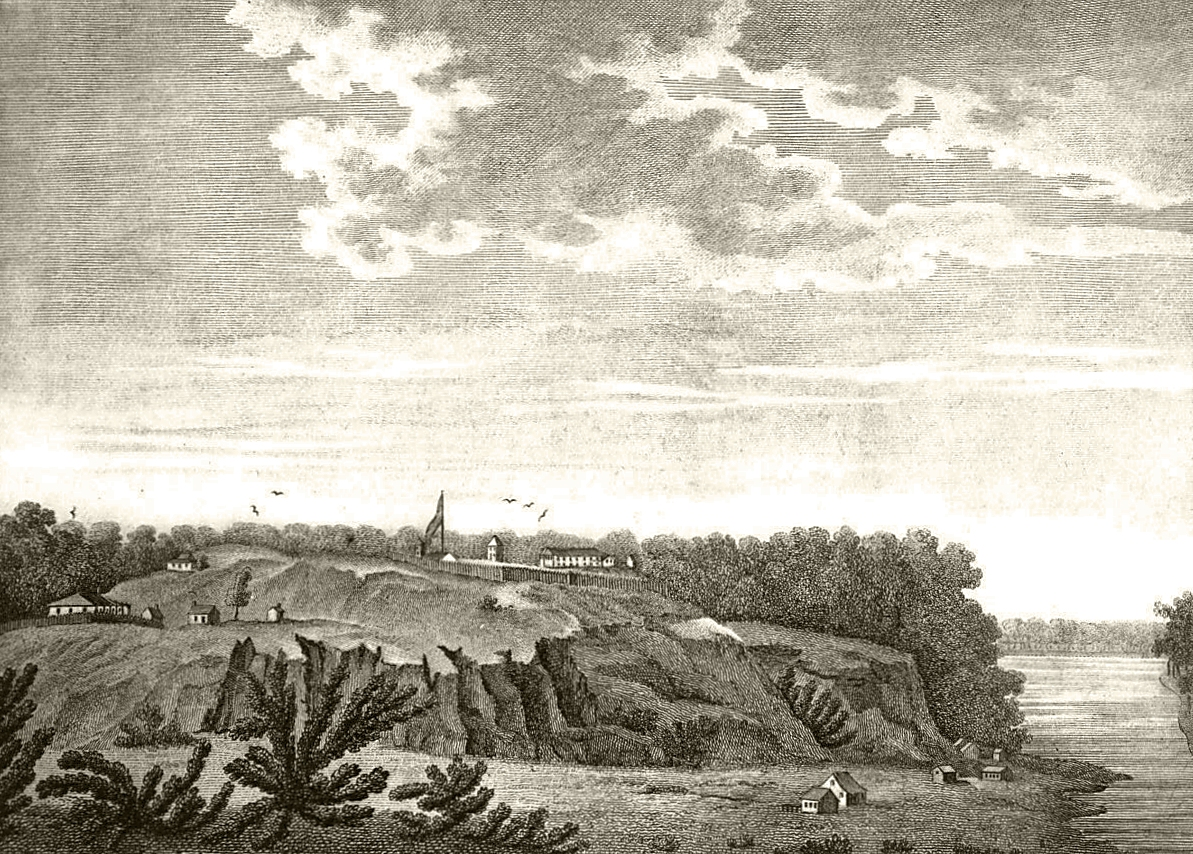
- Drawing of Fort Rosalie, on the Natchez bluff, above the Mississippi River, from a sketch made c. 1796

- Location within Mississippi Location within the United States
- Location: Natchez, Mississippi
- Coordinates: 31°33′24″N 91°24′36″W
- Architect: Jean-Baptiste Le Moyne, Sieur de Bienville
- Architectural style: log-built fort with blockhouses and enclosed within a stockade
- Part of: Natchez Bluffs and Under-the-Hill Historic District (ID72000685)
- Designated CP: April 11, 1972

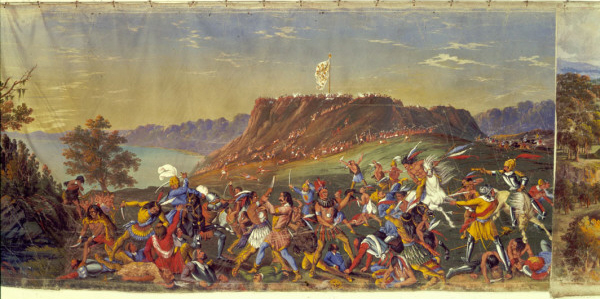
The Natchez Revolt of 1729 with Fort Rosalie in the background from a panoramic painting by John Egan, circa 1850

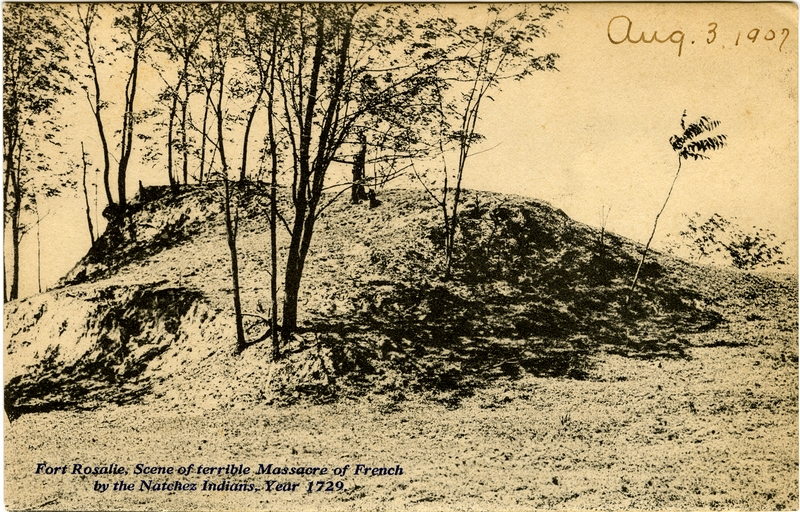
A postcard of the ruins of Fort Panmure, 1907

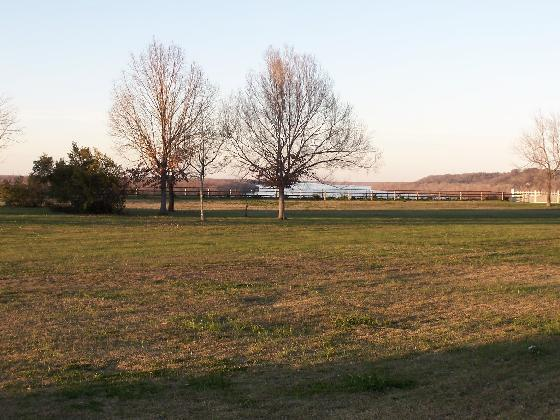
The site where the fort once stood

Fort Rosalie was built by the French in 1716 within the ancestral homeland of the Natchez people, one of the native peoples of the Americas, as part of France's colonial expansion in North America. The fort site is in the present-day city of Natchez, Mississippi, in the United States.

== Early history ==
As part of the peace terms that ended the First Natchez War in 1716, Jean-Baptiste Le Moyne de Bienville compelled the Natchez to provide labor and materials for the fort's construction. Sited close to the main Natchez settlement of Grand Village, Fort Rosalie served as the principal French military and trading post in Natchez territory.

French colonists established settlements and tobacco plantations in Natchez territory, with the fort serving as the local seat of colonial government. Escalating tensions driven by French colonial expansion and Natchez resistance erupted into violence several times during the 1720s, culminating in a coordinated Natchez revolt on November 29, 1729. Natchez fighters destroyed much of the French settlement, killing nearly all the men and capturing hundreds of women and children. The Natchez seized and occupied Fort Rosalie.

French and allied Choctaw military reprisals in early 1730 forced the Natchez to abandon the fort, which was in ruins. Through 1731, the French, with their more numerous Indian allies, continued military campaigns against the Natchez through 1731, killing, capturing, or dispersing most of the Natchez, resulting in the end of the Natchez people as a unified political nation. The French enslaved and deported many surviving Natchez people, many of whom were sent to French plantations in the Caribbean. Some survivors escaped and found refuge among the Chickasaw, Creek, and Cherokee of the region. The French rebuilt Fort Rosalie in the early 1730s.

== Fort Panmure ==
Following the Treaty of Paris in 1763 after the British won the Seven Years' War, France ceded the fort and part of present-day Louisiana to British control (with New Orleans and the land west of the Mississippi River going to Spain). The British renamed the fort Fort Panmure. The British fort was named after William Maule who was the Earl of Panmure.

=== Capture of Fort Panmure ===
The British controlled the fort for 16 years—from that cession (1763) until the Spanish campaign under Galvez in 1779. After Bernardo de Galvez conquered Baton Rouge (1779), Fort Panmure capitulated without further Spanish action. Spanish military intervention was only required in 1781 to suppress a rebellion by local British-aligned settlers. Galvez was the Governor of Spanish Luisiana and commander of Spanish colonial forces. During the American Revolutionary War, Spain declared war against Great Britain and held control of the fort from 1779 to 1798. After 1798, the United States assumed control of the territory, establishing the Mississippi Territory with Natchez as its first territorial capital.

== Today ==
The U.S. abandoned the fort in 1804. The colonial-era city of Natchez developed around the establishment of Fort Rosalie in 1716. Today, the site of the fort is part of Natchez National Historical Park.

== Sources ==
- "Fort Rosalie". North American Forts East: Mississippi.
- Barnett, Jim. "The Natchez Indians". Mississippi History Now. Archived from the original on August 20, 2007.
- DuVal, Kathleen (2006). "Interconnectedness and Diversity in French Louisiana" (PDF). In Waselkov, Gregory A. (ed.). Powhatan's Mantle: Indians in the Colonial Southeast, Revised and Expanded Edition. Lincoln, Nebraska: University of Nebraska Press. ISBN 0-8032-9861-7.
- Eakin, Sue; Culbertson, Manie (2006). Louisiana: The Land and Its People (4th ed.). Gretna, Louisiana: Pelican Publishing. ISBN 978-1-4556-0789-1.
- Gayarré, Charles (1854). History of Louisiana: The French Domination. Vol. 1. New York, New York: Redfield.
- James, D. Clayton (1993). Antebellum Natchez. Baton Rouge, Louisiana: LSU Press. ISBN 978-0-8071-1860-3.
- Lorenz, Karl G. (2000). "The Natchez of Southwest Mississippi". In McEwan, Bonnie G. (ed.). Indians of the Greater Southeast: Historical Archaeology and Ethnohistory. Gainesville, Florida: University Press of Florida. ISBN 0-8130-1778-5.
