= National Register of Historic Places listings in West Feliciana Parish, Louisiana =

Location of West Feliciana Parish in Louisiana

This is a list of the National Register of Historic Places listings in West Feliciana Parish, Louisiana.

This is intended to be a complete list of the properties and districts on the National Register of Historic Places in West Feliciana Parish, Louisiana, United States. The locations of National Register properties and districts for which the latitude and longitude coordinates are included below, may be seen in a map.

There are 32 properties and districts listed on the National Register in the parish, including 1 National Historic Landmark.

This National Park Service list is complete through NPS recent listings posted April 17, 2026.

== Current listings ==
	Name on the Register	Image	Date listed	Location	City or town	Description
1	3 V Tourist Court	3 V Tourist Court	January 21, 1993 (#92001832)	111 E. Commerce St. 30°46′44″N 91°22′32″W	St. Francisville	
2	Afton Villa Gardens	Afton Villa Gardens	February 24, 1983 (#83000554)	North of St. Francisville on U.S. Route 61; 30°51′06″N 91°23′17″W	St. Francisville	
3	Bloodhound Site		May 2, 1983 (#83000555)	Address Restricted	Angola	An archaeological site once occupied by the Tunica tribe.
4	Butler-Greenwood Plantation	Butler-Greenwood Plantation	April 17, 1979 (#79001103)	North of St. Francisville on U.S. Route 61; 30°49′11″N 91°23′23″W	St. Francisville	
5	Catalpa	Catalpa	July 12, 1984 (#84001367)	U.S. Route 61; 30°51′04″N 91°22′33″W	St. Francisville	
6	Como Plantation	Como Plantation	October 10, 2017 (#100001714)	5000 Como Rd. 30°54′23″N 91°31′18″W	Weyanoke	
7	Cottage Plantation	Cottage Plantation	March 17, 1975 (#75000857)	6 miles north of St. Francisville on U.S. Route 61; 30°51′11″N 91°21′37″W	St. Francisville	
8	John S. Dawson High School		June 15, 2015 (#15000348)	7565 Tunica Trace; 30°50′36″N 91°24′06″W	St. Francisville vicinity	
9	Grace Episcopal Church	Grace Episcopal Church	March 28, 1979 (#79001102)	510 Ferdinand St. 30°46′33″N 91°23′14″W	St. Francisville	
10	Hazelwood Plantation	Hazelwood Plantation	July 31, 1978 (#78001438)	Southeast of Laurel Hill on Hazelwood Rd. 30°56′56″N 91°19′56″W	Laurel Hill	
11	Highland		August 23, 1983 (#83000556)	Northwest of St. Francisville, off Highland Rd. 30°53′08″N 91°25′49″W	St. Francisville	
12	Laurel Hill		June 6, 1980 (#80001770)	Northeast of St. Francisville; 30°57′41″N 91°19′33″W	St. Francisville	
13	Live Oak	Live Oak	March 11, 1977 (#77000680)	1.3 miles south of Weyanoke; 30°56′00″N 91°27′17″W	Weyanoke	
14	Myrtles Plantation	Myrtles Plantation	September 6, 1978 (#78001439)	U.S. Route 61; 30°48′11″N 91°23′15″W	St. Francisville	
15	Oak Grove Plantation Dependencies		February 13, 1992 (#92000036)	U.S. Route 61, south of its junction with Louisiana Highway 421; 30°52′34″N 91°21′58″W	St. Francisville	
16	Oakley Plantation House	Oakley Plantation House	January 25, 1973 (#73000878)	4.5 miles east of St. Francisville at Audubon State Historic Site; 30°47′48″N 91°18′26″W	St. Francisville	John James Audubon worked here as Eliza Pirrie's art tutor, for four months in 1821. He painted 32 of his famous Birds of America during that time. Audubon's wife Lucy also taught at Oakley.
17	The Oaks		August 20, 1979 (#79001101)	U.S. Route 61; 30°48′34″N 91°23′12″W	Hardwood	
18	Propinquity	Propinquity	March 26, 1973 (#73000879)	Royal and Johnson Sts. 30°46′27″N 91°23′11″W	St. Francisville	
19	Red Hat Cell Block, Louisiana State Penitentiary	Red Hat Cell Block, Louisiana State Penitentiary	February 20, 2003 (#03000041)	Louisiana State Penitentiary; 30°57′56″N 91°36′49″W	Angola	
20	Rosale Plantation		December 8, 1980 (#80001771)	North of St. Francisville off U.S. Route 61; 30°51′52″N 91°21′36″W	St. Francisville	
21	Rosebank Plantation House		April 13, 1973 (#73000880)	Southeast of Weyanoke off Louisiana Highway 66; 30°55′27″N 91°26′33″W	Weyanoke	
22	Rosedown Plantation	Rosedown Plantation	August 7, 2001 (#01000765)	U.S. Route 61 and Louisiana Highway 10; 30°47′58″N 91°22′23″W	St. Francisville	
23	St. Francisville Historic District		April 2, 1980 (#80001772)	Royal and Prosperity Sts.; also Ferdinand and Sewell Sts. 30°46′28″N 91°23′09″W	St. Francisville	Second set of addresses represents a boundary increase of October 1, 1982
24	St. John's Episcopal Church	St. John's Episcopal Church	October 4, 1984 (#84000016)	Old Laurel Hill Rd. 30°57′24″N 91°20′29″W	Laurel Hill	
25	St. Mary's Episcopal Church	St. Mary's Episcopal Church	September 29, 1980 (#80001774)	Northwest of Weyanoke on Louisiana Highway 66; 30°57′56″N 91°28′11″W	Weyanoke	
26	Solitude Plantation House		January 27, 1983 (#83000558)	Northwest of St. Francisville on Tunica Rd. 30°49′17″N 91°25′26″W	St. Francisville	
27	Star Hill Plantation Dependency		July 24, 2003 (#03000680)	5018 U.S. Route 61; 30°45′56″N 91°19′00″W	Star Hill	
28	Star Hill Post Office and Store		February 4, 2000 (#00000038)	4630 U.S. Route 61; 30°45′43″N 91°18′24″W	St. Francisville	
29	Trudeau House		July 28, 1995 (#95000919)	Junction of Louisiana Highway 66 and Old Tunica Rd. 30°56′06″N 91°32′15″W	Tunica	
30	Trudeau Landing		June 17, 1977 (#77000679)	Address Restricted	Tunica	An archaeological site once occupied by the Tunica tribe.
31	Wakefield		June 6, 1980 (#80001773)	U.S. Route 61; 30°53′18″N 91°21′14″W	Wakefield	
32	Weyanoke	Weyanoke	November 15, 1990 (#90001750)	Sligo Rd., 5 miles north of its junction with Louisiana Highway 66; 30°56′14″N 91°25′03″W	Weyanoke	

== See also ==
- List of Louisiana state historic sites
- List of National Historic Landmarks in Louisiana
- National Register of Historic Places listings in East Feliciana Parish, Louisiana
