= Tunica treasure =

Native American artifact trove

Location of Tunica-Biloxi Indian Reservation in Louisiana

The Tunica treasure is a group of artifacts from the Tunica-Biloxi tribe discovered in the 1960s. Their discovery led to a protracted legal battle over their ownership, and the eventual passage of the Native American Graves Protection and Repatriation Act.

== Site ==
Trudeau Landing, which is on the National Register of Historic Places, is located in Tunica, Louisiana.

== Terminology ==
The term Tunica treasure was introduced by archaeologist Jeffrey Brain, a name which he later came to regret.

== Background ==
In the spring of 1541 Hernando de Soto and his army approached the eastern bank of the Mississippi River, coming upon the Province of Quizquiz (pronounced "keys-key"). These people spoke a dialect of the Tunica language, which is a language isolate. At that time, these related groups covered a large region extending along both sides of the Mississippi River in present-day Mississippi and Arkansas, as the expedition would soon learn.

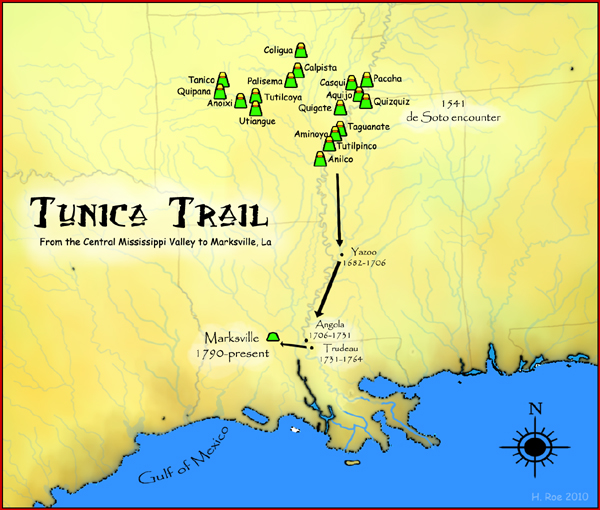
Tunica Trail showing migrations south from the Central Missisissippi valley. The Tunica moved to the Trudeau site in 1731 after the attack at Angola.

It was 150 years before another European group recorded the Tunica. In 1699 the LaSource expedition (coming downriver from French Canada) encountered the Tunica, describing them as a modestly sized tribe numbering only a few hundred warriors. They and other peoples had suffered from smallpox epidemics, which had high mortality rates as they had no natural immunity to this new disease carried by Europeans. (Pringle, Heather (4 June 2015). "How Europeans brought sickness to the New World". Online: Science.).

The Tunica were skilled traders and entrepreneurs, especially in the manufacture and distribution of salt, a valuable item to both native and Europeans.

By the early 18th century, the tribes along the lower Mississippi River were a target of Chickasaw raids for the English slave trade in South Carolina. By 1706 the Tunica decided to move.

As their enemies the Natchez were to their immediate south, they moved to the Mississippi side of the Mississippi and Red River confluence. This allowed them to keep control of their salt trade, as the Red River also connected to their salt source in the Caddoan areas.

They established a loose collection of hamlets and villages at present-day Angola, Louisiana. The archeological remains of a small hamlet from this time period were discovered in 1976 by an inmate of Angola Prison. It is known as the Bloodhound Site.

== Tunica treasure ==
In the 1960s, graves at the Trudeau Landing site in West Feliciana Parish, Louisiana were dug up by Leonard Charrier, a local self-described treasure hunter, who worked as a guard at Louisiana State Prison (Angola). He took many artifacts from the area, which had been deposited as grave goods with the more than 100 graves. The Tunica felt that he had stolen tribal heirlooms and desecrated the graves of their ancestors and were outraged at the violations. He tried to sell the artifacts to the Peabody Museum at Harvard University, but the transaction stalled when the museum found that he did not have legal title to the items.

In the 1970s the site was excavated by archaeologists, uncovering large amounts of pottery, European trade goods and other artifacts deposited as grave goods by the Tunica from 1731 to 1764 when they occupied the site. With help from the State of Louisiana, the tribe filed suit to gain title to the artifacts, which has subsequently become known as the "Tunica treasure". The case took a decade to be decided in the courts, but the ruling became a landmark in American Indian history. It helped to lay the groundwork for new federal legislation, the Native American Graves Protection and Repatriation Act (NAGPRA), passed in 1990.

A decade passed in the courts, but the ruling became a landmark in Native American history, and it helped lay the groundwork for new Federal legislation, the Native American Graves Protection and Repatriation Act, passed in 1990. It was also used to prove the ancient heritage of the Tunica peoples, and helped them to gain state and Federal recognition.

A museum to house the artifacts was built by the Tunica-Biloxi, in Marksville, Louisiana. They are using it also as a conservation and education center for preservation of their artifacts.

Because the artifacts had been separated from the original burials and connections were lost, the tribe decided to build a museum to house these items. Members of the tribe were trained as conservators in order to repair damage done to the artifacts by the centuries underground and handling during the ten-year court battle. The museum was built in the shape of the ancient temple mounds of their people, with the earthen structure to take the symbolic place of the original burial underground. It opened in 1989 as The Tunica-Biloxi Regional Indian Center and Museum. Due to structural problems, it was closed in 1999, with plans for a new larger facility underway. Today the Tunica Treasure collection is housed in the Tunica-Biloxi Cultural and Educational Resources Center, a state-of-the-art facility that includes a library, conservation center, distance-learning center, conference facilities, tribal offices, and museum on the tribal reservation in Marksville. Eighty percent of the artifacts of the Tunica Treasure have been restored.

== See also ==
- List of sites and peoples visited by the Hernando de Soto Expedition
- Mississippian culture
- List of Mississippian sites
- Southeastern Ceremonial Complex
- Mound Builders
