= Live Oak =

Live Oak may refer to:

- The live oak, any of several types of oak trees that have evergreen foliage.

== Localities in the United States ==
- Live Oak, Santa Cruz County, California, a census-designated place
- Live Oak, Sutter County, California, an incorporated city
- Live Oak, Florida, an incorporated city
- Live Oak (Weyanoke, Louisiana), plantation house and site listed on the NRHP in Louisiana
- Live Oak, South Carolina, a census-designated place
- Live Oak, Texas, an incorporated city
- Live Oak County, Texas

== High schools in the United States ==
- Live Oak High School (Morgan Hill, California)
- Live Oak High School (Louisiana), in Watson

== Other ==
- Live Oak Brewing Company, a craft brewery located in Austin, Texas
- LIVE OAK (planning group), the code name for a military planning group during the Cold War
- Live Oak Library, a LA County Library branch in Arcadia, California
