= Yazoo people =

Historical Native American tribe from Mississippi

Yazoo
Total population
- Extinct as a tribe

Regions with significant populations
- United States (Mississippi)

Languages
- Tunica language

Religion
- Native tribal religion

Related ethnic groups
- Tunica, Koroa, Tioux

The Yazoo were a tribe of the Native American Tunica people historically located along the lower course of the Yazoo River in an area known as the Mississippi Delta. They were closely related to other Tunica language–speaking peoples, especially the Tunica, Koroa, and possibly the Tioux.

== Language ==
Yazoo
- (unattested)
- Native to: United States
- Region: Mississippi
- Ethnicity: Yazoo
- Extinct: (date missing)
- Language family: Tunican?: Yazoo

Language codes
- ISO 639-3: None (mis)

Nothing is definitely known about their language, believed to be related to Tunica, a language isolate.

== History ==
=== 17th century ===
French explorers and missionaries documented the tribe. In 1699, Father Antoine Davion of the Quebec Seminary of Foreign Missions in New France (Canada) established a mission among the Tunica.

=== 18th century ===
At this time, the Yazoo, like the Chickasaw, were under the influence of the English traders from Carolina on the Atlantic coast. In 1702, the Yazoo aided the Koroa in killing the French priest Nicholas Foucault and his three companions. The seminary temporarily withdrew Fr Antoine from the area.

In 1718, the French established a fort near the village of St. Pierre to command the river. In 1722 the young Jesuit priest Jean Rouel was given the Yazoo mission near the French post. He worked there until the outbreak of the Natchez revolt in 1729.

At that time, the Yazoo and Koroa joined with the Natchez in attacking the French colonists, in an attempt to drive them out of the region altogether.

On November 29, 1729, the Natchez attacked Fort Rosalie, killing more than 200 people, including the Jesuit priest Paul Du Poisson. They carried off as captives most of the French women and children, and their African slaves. On learning of the event, the Yazoo and Koroa, on December 11, 1729, waylaid and killed Rouel and his black slave. The next day, they attacked the neighboring post, killing the whole garrison. The tribes buried Rouel's body. His bell and some books were afterward recovered and restored to the French by the Quapaw. Another priest, Stephen Doutreleau, was attacked on January 1, 1730, but was able to escape.

The Natchez War of 1729 was a disaster for French settlements in Louisiana. The colonists withdrew in retreat to New Orleans. It was also a disaster for the Natchez and Yazoo. The French allied with the Choctaw for retaliation and overwhelmingly defeated the Natchez and Yazoo. They sold survivors into slavery on Caribbean plantations. The Chickasaw captured many other Yazoo men and sold them into slavery to Carolina-based traders. This ended the Yazoo as a tribe; their survivors intermarried with the Chickasaw, Africans, and other peoples.

== In fiction ==
John Grisham's story "Casino", included in the short-story collection Ford County (2009), turns on a shady businessman in present-day Mississippi gathering several dozen people with purported Yazoo ancestry to seek tribal status. He gains federal recognition for them as a Native American tribe, which would enable them to use their land to develop a gaming casino.

== Notable Yazoo people ==
- Moncacht Apé was an explorer who, in the late 1600s or early 1700s, may have made the first recorded round trip transcontinental journey across North America.
