= Robert Ruffin Barrow =

American land and slave owner (1798–1875)

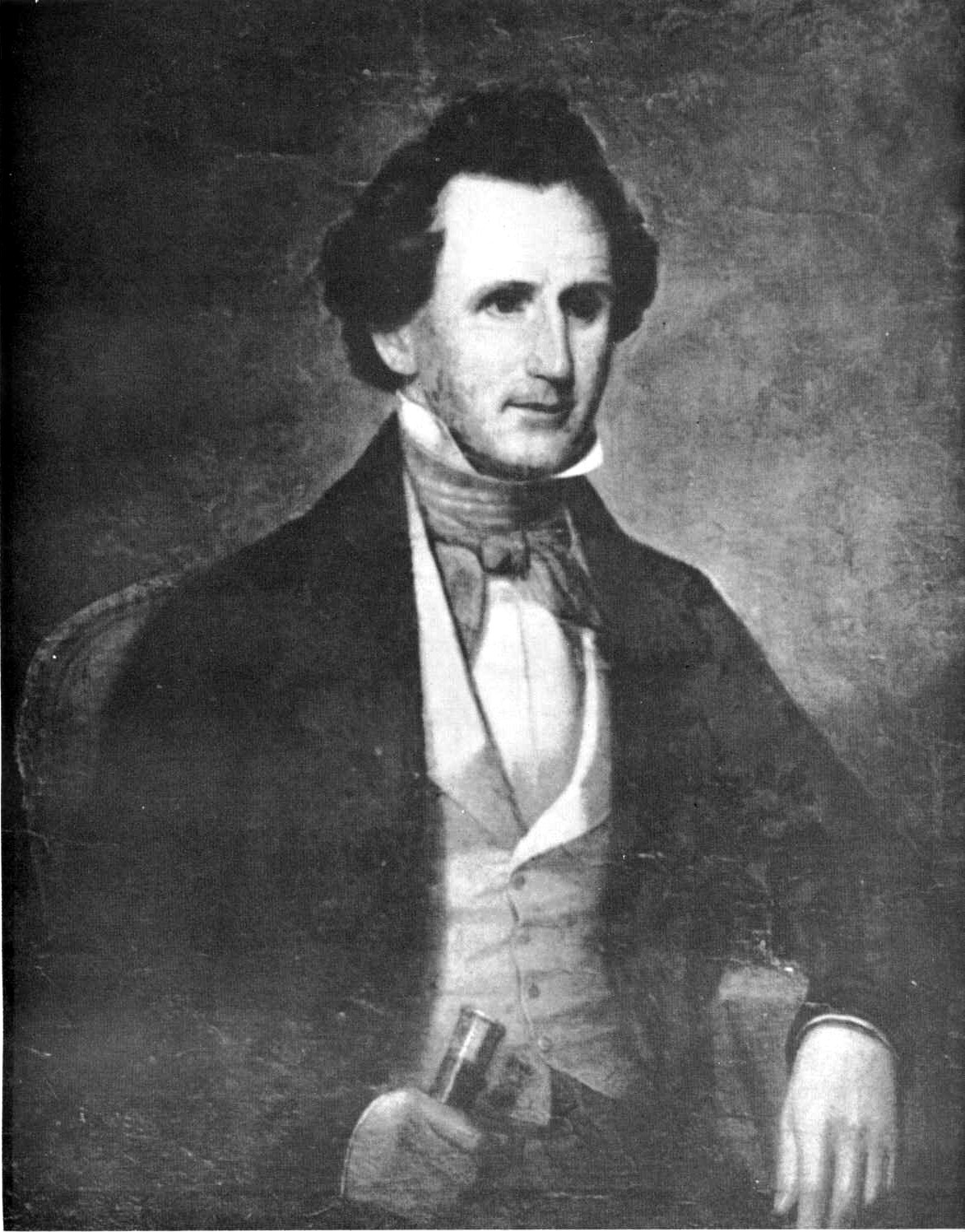
- Born: 1798; North Carolina, U.S.
- Died: 1875 (aged 76–77)
- Occupation: Planter
- Spouse: Volumnia Washington Hunley
- Children: 1 son, 1 daughter
- Parent: Bartholomew Barrow
- Relatives: Horace Lawson Hunley (brother-in-law)

Robert Ruffin Barrow (1798 – 1875) was one of the owners of the most land and slaves in the southern United States before the American Civil War. He owned sixteen plantations, mostly in Louisiana, and had large landholdings in Texas. He also invested money in projects in which he saw potential. The most well known investment he made was in the early submarine projects of his brother-in-law, Horace Hunley, for the Confederate States Navy.

== Early life ==
Barrow was born in 1798 in North Carolina. His father Bartholomew Barrow owned Afton Villa. His uncle William Barrow III owned Highland Plantation.

Robert Ruffin Barrow's first cousin and neighbor was Bennet Hillard Barrow, whose diary has been cited by historians for the extreme brutality he recorded toward his enslaved people. His diary records at least 160 whippings administered over a 23-month period, including several on a large scale ("had a general Whipping frollick," "Whipped about half to day").

== Career ==
Barrow was one of the largest landowners in Terrebonne Parish, Louisiana, where he owned six plantations: Residence, Caillou Grove, Honduras, Myrtle Grove, Crescent Farm, and Point Farm. Residence Plantation took its name from the fact that Barrow regarded it as his home. Its main house Residence Plantation House is currently on the National Register of Historical Places. He also owned the Donaldsonville Plantation in Ascension Parish, the Locust Grove Plantation in Assumption Parish, the Oak Grove Plantation in Lafourche Parish, and several plantations in Texas. He became "one of the wealthiest planters" in Louisiana, and the owner of hundreds of slaves.

During the American Civil War of 1861–1865, Barrow financed the construction of submarines for the Confederate States Navy. He lost much of his wealth as a result of the war, however much was regained back to his family and descendants.

Barrow was politically active in Louisiana.

== Personal life, death and legacy ==
Barrow married Volumnia Washington Hunley, the sister of Confederate Navy officer Horace Lawson Hunley, in 1850. They had a son, Robert Ruffin Jr., and a daughter, Volumnia Roberta.

Barrow died in 1875. His daughter Roberta, who inherited his Residence Plantation in Terrebone Parish, built the Residence Plantation House, now listed on the National Register of Historic Places.

== See also ==
- Alexander Barrow
- Residence Plantation House
