= Trudeau House =

Historic house in Louisiana, United States

- U.S. National Register of Historic Places
- Location within Louisiana Location within the United States
- Location: Junction of Louisiana Highway 66 and Old Tunica Rd., Tunica, Louisiana
- Coordinates: 30°56′6″N 91°32′15″W
- Area: less than one acre
- Built: c.1830
- Architectural style: Greek Revival, French Creole
- MPS: Louisiana's French Creole Architecture MPS
- NRHP reference No.: 95000919
- Added to NRHP: July 28, 1995

Trudeau House, near Tunica in West Feliciana Parish, Louisiana, was built in about 1830. It is a two-story brick and frame building with "hesitant touches of the Greek Revival style." It was listed on the National Register of Historic Places in 1995.

It has been believed to be associated with Oliver Pollock, who was involved in financing the American Revolution, operating out of New Orleans, but that now seems unlikely. Pollock owned the land before 1782 and after 1789. The land with the house was sold in 1813 and Pollock lived in Mississippi from 1819 until his death in 1823, however, so dating of the house to c. 1830 rules out direct association.

== See also ==
- Trudeau Landing
- National Register of Historic Places listings in West Feliciana Parish, Louisiana
