= Koroa =

Extinct Native American tribe

Total population
- Extinct as a nation, adopted into neighboring groups

Regions with significant populations
- United States (Mississippi)

Languages
- likely Tunican

Religion
- Indigenous religion

Related ethnic groups
- Tunica, Yazoo, Tioux

The Koroa (Tunica: korwa) were one of the groups of Indigenous people of the Southeastern Woodlands who lived in the Mississippi Valley before French colonization. The Koroa lived in the Yazoo River basin in present-day northwest Mississippi.

== Language ==
Koroa
- Akoroa
- (unattested)
- Native to: United States
- Region: Mississippi
- Ethnicity: Koroa
- Extinct: (date missing)
- Language family: Tunican?: Koroa

Language codes
- ISO 639-3: None (mis)

The Koroa are believed to have spoken a dialect of Tunica. However, French missionaries described the Koroa (which they spelled Courouais) as speaking the same language as the Yazoo but a different tongue from the Tunica. They may have described a distinct dialect or a related Tunican language.

== Name ==
Jacques Marquette referred to them by the name Akoroa.

== History ==
=== 15th century ===
The Koroa may be the polity identified by Hernando de Soto's expedition as the Coligua or Cologoa. They may have met the Spanish expedition in 1541 near present-day Little Rock, Arkansas.

=== 17th century ===
The Koroa lived on both sides of the Mississippi River when the French encountered them in the late 17th century. At least one of their villages was on the river's east bank. In 1682, La Salle visited a Koroa town on the Western side of the Mississippi twice, both on the descent and the return journey. His party feasted there, and saw Quinipissas, whom they described as the Koroa's allies, living in the village.

A 1698 French missionary expedition also found them living in the same area as the Tunica, Yazoo, and Houspé, and Father Antoine Davion was sent to convert them to Catholicism.

=== 18th century ===
In 1702, a French Catholic missionary named Nicolas Foucault was killed while prosleytizing his religion among the Koroa. The Koroa's leaders had the murderers executed. Many members of the Koroa were adopted by the Tunica, Chickasaw, or Natchez after European diseases had killed so many Koroa people.

== See also ==
- List of sites and peoples visited by the Hernando de Soto Expedition

== Sources ==
- Gibson, Arrell M. "The Indians of Mississippi," in McLemore, Richard Aubrey, ed. A History of Mississippi (Hattiesburg: University and College Press of Mississippi, 1973) vol. 1
