= Tunica Hills Wildlife Management Area =

Protected area in Louisiana, United States

- Tunica Hills WMA
- Location within Louisiana
- Location: West Feliciana Parish, Louisiana
- Coordinates: 30°55′56″N 91°30′24″W
- Area: 6,503 acres (26.32 km^{2})
- Established: 1991
- Governing body: Louisiana Department of Wildlife and Fisheries

Tunica Hills Wildlife Management Area, also called Tunica Hills WMA, are 6,503 acres (2,632 ha) of protected land consisting of a north and south tract, in West Feliciana Parish, Louisiana. The WMA is owned and managed by the Louisiana Department of Wildlife and Fisheries (LDWF).

A WMA Access Permit is required on all LDWF administered lands, including wildlife management areas, refuges and wetlands conservation areas. A self-clearing permit is required daily. Individuals holding a valid hunting license, fishing license, or a Wild Louisiana Stamp are exempt from the access permit requirement.

== Location and Description ==
The WMA, established in 1991, consists of the 2,346 acres (949 ha) North Tract and the 4,156 acres (1,682 ha) south tract on Old Tunica Road. The tracts are separated by Louisiana Highway 66. Tunica Hills Wildlife Management Area is within the western edge of the Mississippi Valley Loess Plains, in the loess bluff. escarpment. The WMA is bordered by Angola prison and the Mississippi River on the west, the Louisiana and Mississippi border on the north, and Thompson Creek and the Mississippi River on the east and south.

== Trails ==
The south tract has three trails. An access permit required:

- Trail A: 4.2 miles (6.8 km) loop classified as a moderate hike.
- Trail B: 3.4 miles (5.5 km) hike.
- Trail C: 3.7 miles (6.0 km) hike.

The north tract has a 5.7 miles (9.2 km) challenging trail.

== Fauna and flora ==
=== Flora ===
The under-story consists of the nearly extirpated Canada wild ginger, and the American ginseng. It is illegal to harvest in Louisiana, and is therefore illegal to export, as it is considered critically imperiled (S1). Other species are the Allegheny spurge, Canada nettle, Dutchman’s pipe, Eastern Redbud, fetid wake-robin (stinking Benjamin), Honewort, Hound’s tongue, Oak-leaf hydrangea, Mountain hydrangea, Paw paw, Red buckeye, River cane, silvery glade fern, Southern stoneseed, white baneberry (or doll’s eyes), The American columbo may have become extirpated.

The over-story consists of American beech, American holly, Bitternut hickory, Black walnut, Carolina basswood, cherrybark oak, cucumber magnolia, Honey locust, loblolly pine, Pyramid magnolia, Shumard oak, slippery elm, Southern magnolia, Southern sugar maple, sweet gum, tulip tree, and white ash.

=== Fauna ===
Acadian Flycatcher, Barred Owl, Black Vulture, Blue-gray gnatcatcher, Blue Jay, Brown Thrasher, Carolina chickadee, Carolina Wren, Cooper's hawk, and Eastern chipmunks, Eastern Towhee, Eastern Wood-Pewee, Fish Crow, Great crested flycatcher, Hooded Warbler, Indigo Bunting, Louisiana black bear, Louisiana waterthrush, Mississippi Kite, Northern cardinal, Red-eyed Vireo, Red-bellied Woodpecker, Red-shouldered hawks, Summer tanager, Timber rattlesnakes, Tufted titmouse, Turkey vultures, Webster's salamander, White-eyed Vireo, White-tailed deer, Wild turkey, Wood thrush, Worm-eating warbler, and Yellow-billed cuckoo, and Yellow-throated Vireo.
