= Alexander Barrow =

American politician (1801–1846)

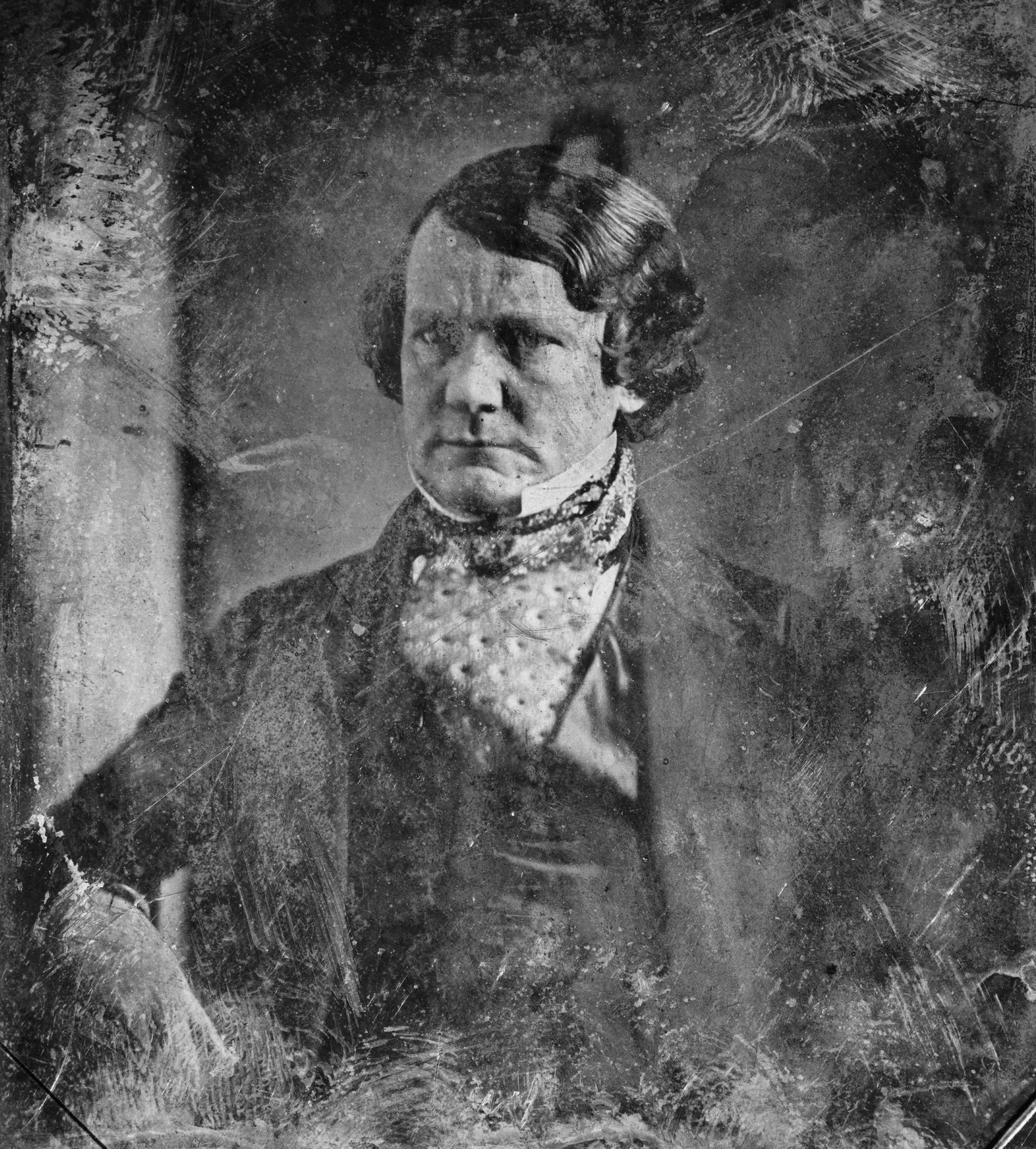

United States Senator from Louisiana
- In office March 4, 1841 – December 29, 1846
- Preceded by: Robert C. Nicholas
- Succeeded by: Pierre Soulé

Member of the Louisiana House of Representatives

Personal details
- Born: March 27, 1801 Nashville, Tennessee, US
- Died: December 29, 1846 (aged 45) Baltimore, Maryland, US
- Party: Whig
- Spouse: Mary Ann Barrow
- Education: United States Military Academy
- Profession: Politician, Lawyer, Planter

Alexander Barrow I (March 27, 1801 – December 29, 1846) was a lawyer, slave owner, and United States senator from Louisiana. He was a member of the Whig Party. He was the half-brother of Washington Barrow, sharing the same father.

Barrow was born south of Nashville, Tennessee, to Willie Barrow and his first wife Jane Greer. According to the memoirs of Jane Thomas, "Wiley Barrow was a very prominent man. He had about ten acres of ground in South Nashville. He had a great many locust-trees on his place, and it was called 'Barrow's Grove.' His first wife was Jane Greer, a sister of Mrs. Tom Tolbert. He had three children. David and Alexander moved to Mississippi, where they both became distinguished men. His daughter, Jane, married a distinguished young lawyer, Henry Crabb. After the death of his first wife, Wiley Barrow married Miss Anne Beck. She had three children, Washington, Micajah, and John E. Washington married Miss Anne Shelby, Micajah did not marry, and John E. moved to St. Louis."

Barrow attended the United States Military Academy in West Point, New York, from 1816 to 1818. Then he studied law and was admitted to the bar, in 1822, commencing practice in Nashville.

Soon afterward he relocated to Feliciana Parish, Louisiana, where he continued to practice law. Later he abandoned his legal career to become a planter.

Eventually, Alexander Barrow became involved in politics and was elected to the Louisiana House of Representatives, where he served for several years. While in state office, he denounced bans on slave imports, and said that the state's "wealth and property" were attributable "fair and fully upon the labor of slaves."

In 1840 Barrow was elected a Whig to the United States Senate, serving from 1841 until his death. There he was Chairman of the Committee on Public Buildings and Grounds during the 27th Congress and of the Committee on the Militia during the 27th and 28th Congresses. According to longtime Washington journalist Benjamin Perley Poore, Barrow was "the handsomest man in the Senate."

Senator Barrow died in Baltimore, Maryland, on December 29, 1846. His remains were interred in the family cemetery on Afton Villa plantation, near Bayou Sara, Louisiana.

Alexander and Mary Ann Barrow had three children, Alexander II, Willie Micajah, and Jane.

== See also ==
- List of members of the United States Congress who died in office (1790–1899)
- Robert Ruffin Barrow

== Sources ==
- Thomas, Jane Henry (1897). Old Days in Nashville, Tennessee. Nashville, Tennessee: Publishing house Methodist Episcopal church, South, Barbee & Smith, agents. hdl:loc.gdc/scd0001.00146133502. LCCN 08018615. OCLC 4159540. OL 140000W.

U.S. Senate
Preceded by Robert C. Nicholas	U.S. senator (Class 2) from Louisiana; March 4, 1841 – December 29, 1846; Served alongside: Alexandre Mouton, Charles M. Conrad and Henry Johnson	Succeeded by Pierre Soulé
