= St. John's Episcopal Church (Laurel Hill, Louisiana) =

Historic church in Louisiana, United States

- U.S. National Register of Historic Places
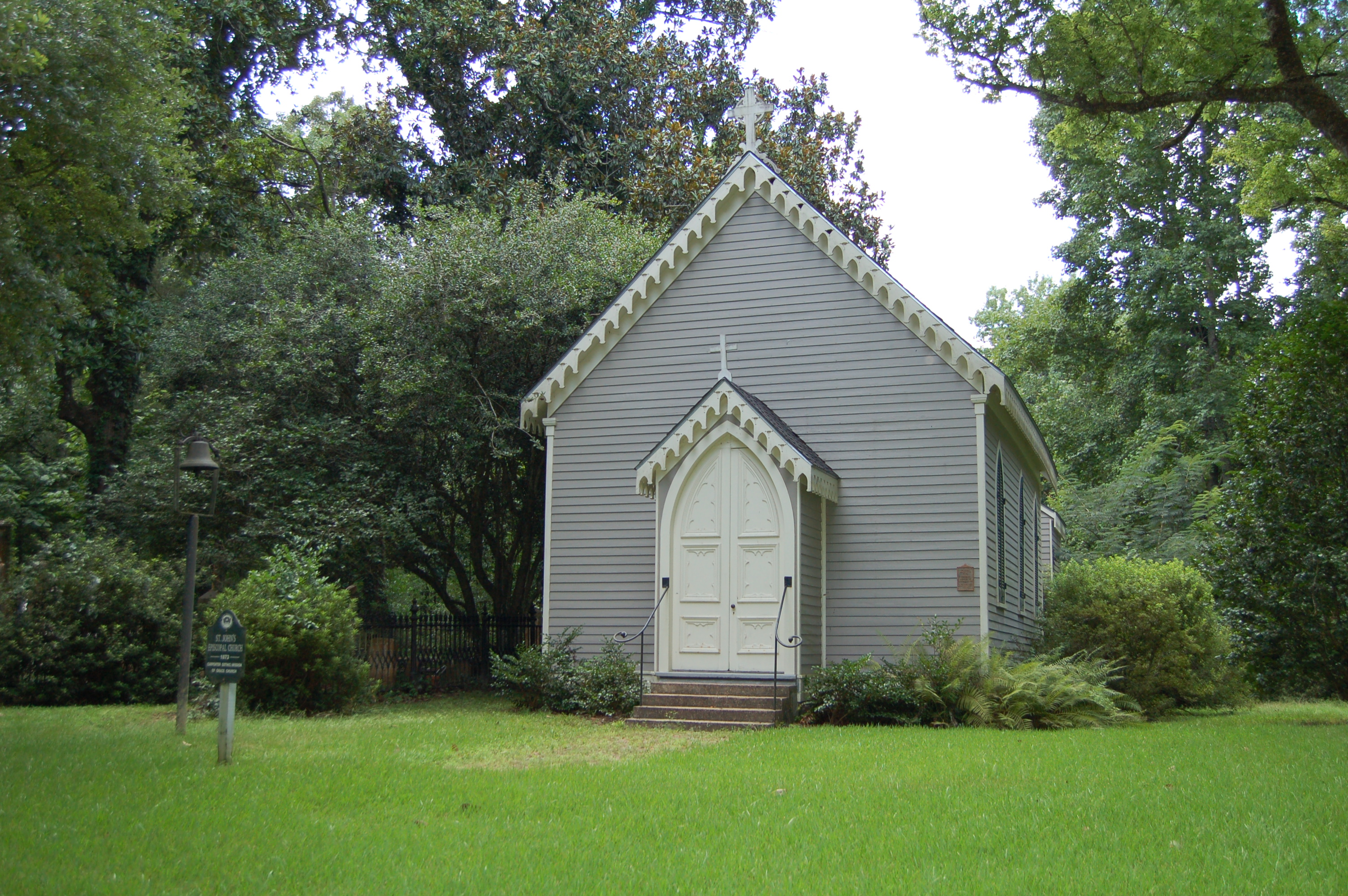

- Location within Louisiana Location within the United States
- Location: Old Laurel Hill Rd., Laurel Hill, Louisiana
- Coordinates: 30°57′24″N 91°20′29″W
- Area: 0.7 acres (0.28 ha)
- Built: 1873
- Architect: William Goddard
- Architectural style: Carpenter Gothic
- NRHP reference No.: 84000016
- Added to NRHP: October 4, 1984

St. John's Episcopal Church is a historic church on Old Laurel Hill Road in Laurel Hill, Louisiana. It is maintained as a chapel of Grace Church of West Feliciana Parish.

It was built in 1873 and added to the National Register in 1984.

== History ==
In 1872, the Reverend J.P. Lytton, of Woodville, Mississippi held Episcopalian services in Laurel Hill. The demand for services was large enough that Bishop Wilmer held services on March 17, 1873, and commissioned J. Burruss McGehee to be a lay reader to hold further services. These were held at first in the local Methodist chapel and then at the home of Colonel V.D. Walsh.

The parish was organized as St. John's Church on September 28, 1873, with the Reverend A.G. Bakewell as rector; McGehee as senior warden and Walsh as junior warden.

William Goddard built the church with the first service was held on November 23, 1873. Total cost of the construction including furniture was $2,200. Colonel Walsh contributed $1,000 and the church became a memorial to his only daughter, Susie Jessie Walsh. The church was consecrated on Whitsunday, May 14, 1874. Early rectors included J. Wilmer Turner, Frank E. Evans, and E.W. Hunter,

== See also ==
- Grace Episcopal Church (St. Francisville, Louisiana): also NRHP-listed in West Feliciana Parish
- St. Mary's Episcopal Church (Weyanoke, Louisiana): also NRHP-listed in West Feliciana Parish
- National Register of Historic Places listings in West Feliciana Parish, Louisiana
