= Residence Plantation House =

- U.S. National Register of Historic Places
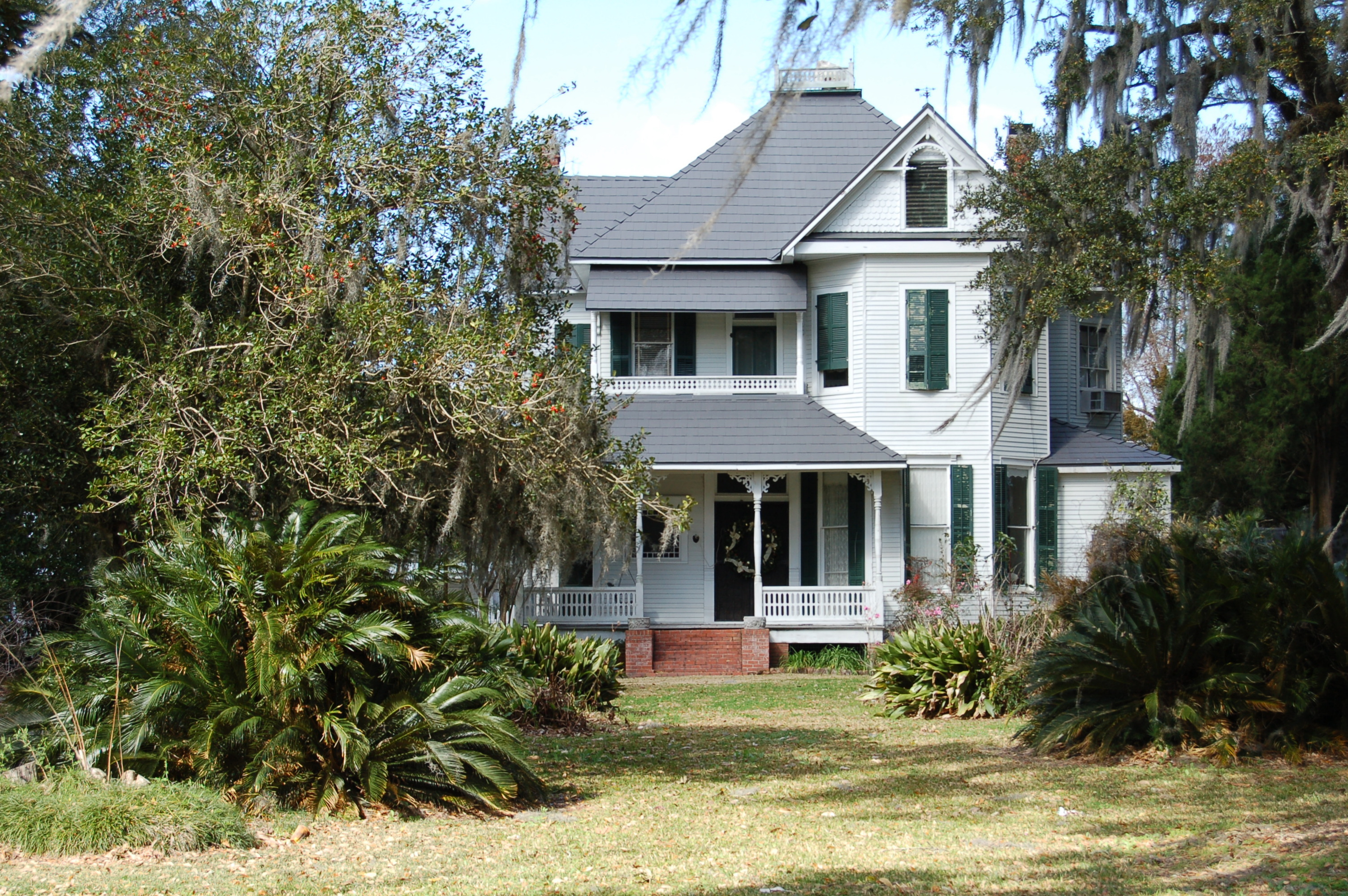

- Location within Louisiana
- Location: 8951 Park Avenue, Houma, Louisiana
- Coordinates: 29°35′53″N 90°41′21″W
- Area: 4.7 acres (1.9 ha)
- Built: 1898
- Architectural style: Queen Anne, Stick/eastlake
- NRHP reference No.: 01000943
- Added to NRHP: September 8, 2001

The Residence Plantation House is a historic house on a former plantation in Houma, Louisiana, U.S.. It was built in 1898 for Roberta Barrow, the daughter of sugar planter Robert Ruffin Barrow. Her father lived in a house on the plantation; Roberta "demolished her father's antebellum home and built the current structure on its site." Her grandfather was the owner of Afton Villa.

The house was designed in the Queen Anne architectural style, with Eastlake features. It has been listed on the National Register of Historic Places since September 8, 2001.
