= St. Mary's Episcopal Church (Weyanoke, Louisiana) =

Historic church in Louisiana, United States

- U.S. National Register of Historic Places
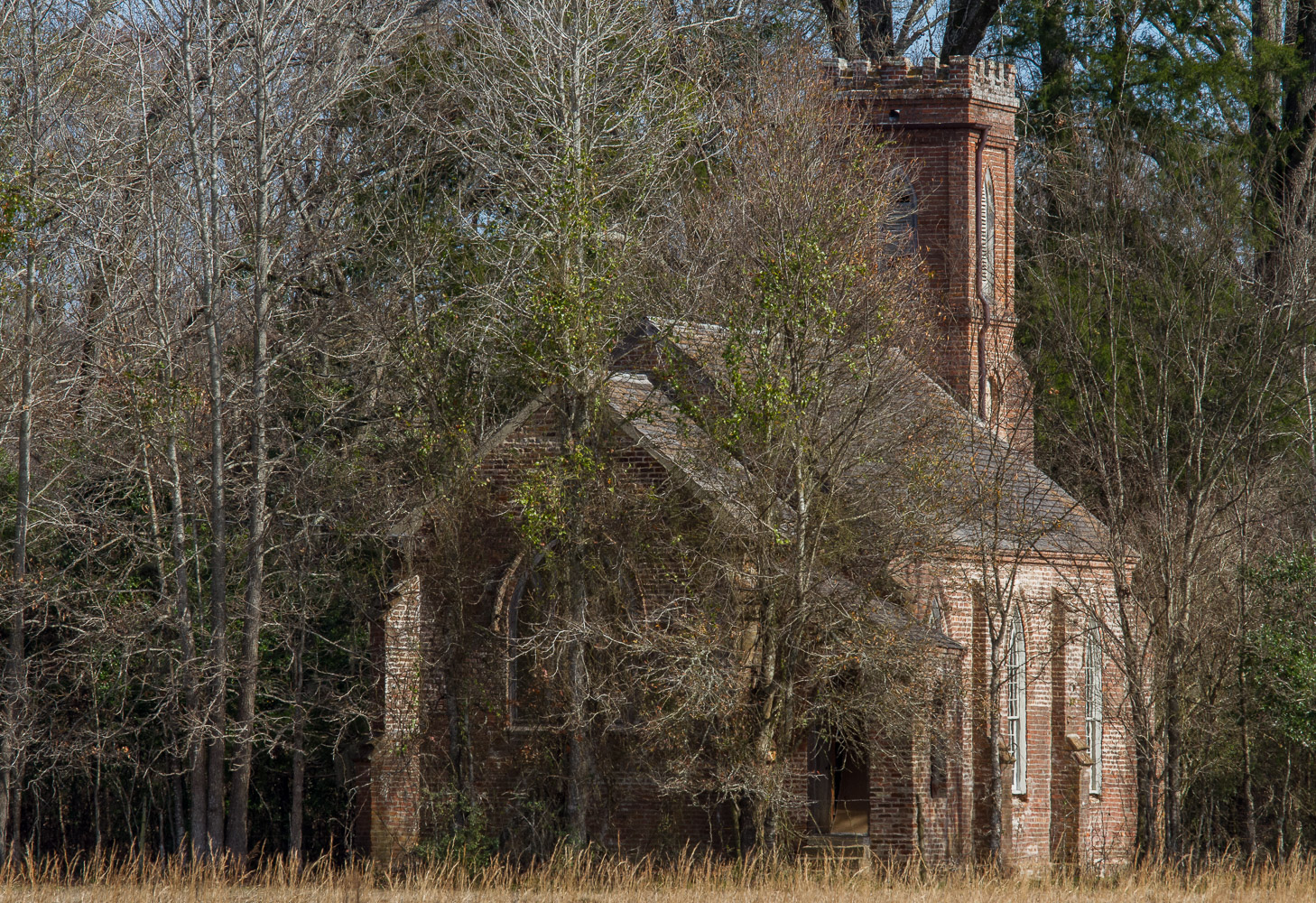
- St. Mary's Episcopal Church viewed from Louisiana Highway 66

- Location within Louisiana Location within the United States
- Nearest city: Weyanoke, Louisiana
- Coordinates: 30°57′56″N 91°28′11″W
- Area: less than one acre
- Built: 1857
- Architectural style: Gothic Revival
- NRHP reference No.: 80001774
- Added to NRHP: September 29, 1980

St. Mary's Episcopal Church is a historic church building located in Weyanoke, Louisiana.

St. Mary's Episcopal Church was built in 1857 to serve approximately 20 plantation families in the remote Tunica area north of St. Francisville, Louisiana. The church's design is attributed to Frank Wills, a New York architect who was a prominent proponent of the Gothic Revival style in the 19th century. Wills believed that the English country church was the ideal model for American Episcopal congregations, a belief reflected in St. Mary's design. Other churches by Wills in the region include Christ Church in Napoleonville, Louisiana, and the Chapel of the Cross near Madison, Mississippi.

In 1858, the church was consecrated by Bishop (later Confederate General) Leonidas Polk, the "Fighting Bishop" of Civil War fame. The church was built on the Old East Tunica Road on 5 acres of land donated by Sarah Mulford. The land's title description is written as "per aversionem," making the exact boundaries difficult to identify.

In 1928, the construction of State Highway 66, about half a mile west of the church, led to the abandonment of the old road. This left the church without vehicular access except via private farm roads. The church was deconsecrated in 1947 and now stands empty, gradually being overtaken by the surrounding forest, which has completely overgrown the graveyard north of the church and the old roadway.

St. Mary's Church was listed on the National Register of Historic Places in 1980. Its nomination describes it as " an elegant and generally well-proportioned example of mid-19th century Gothic Revival ecclesiastical architecture. It is one of only about twelve such examples in the state."

== See also ==
- Grace Episcopal Church (St. Francisville, Louisiana): also NRHP-listed in West Feliciana Parish
- St. John's Episcopal Church (Laurel Hill, Louisiana): also NRHP-listed in West Feliciana Parish
- National Register of Historic Places listings in West Feliciana Parish, Louisiana
