= Live Oak plantation, Louisiana =

Historic house in Louisiana, United States

- Live Oak
- U.S. National Register of Historic Places
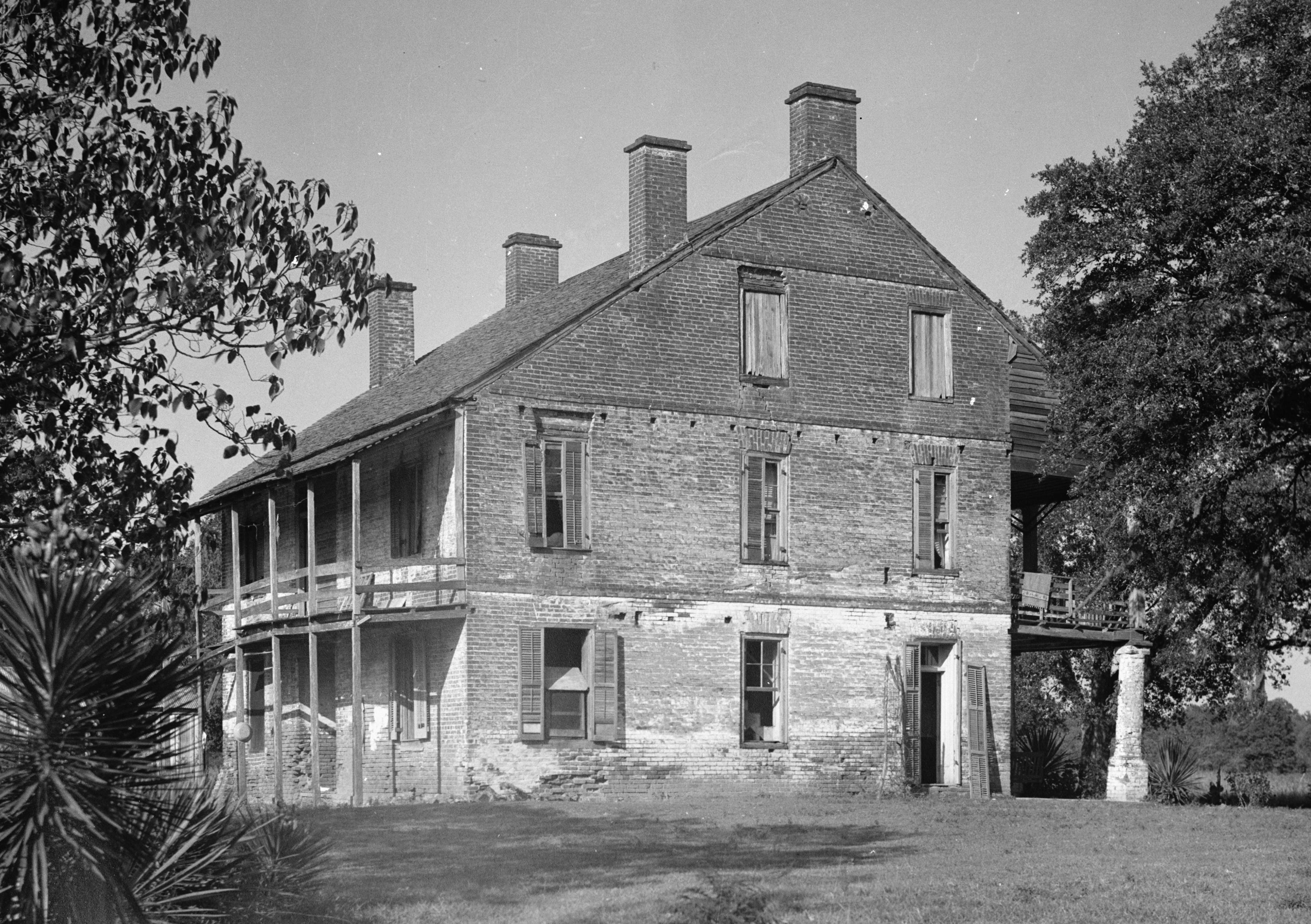
- Live Oak Plantation House in the 1970s

- Location within Louisiana Location within the United States
- Location: Weyanoke, West Feliciana Parish, Louisiana, United States
- Nearest city: Weyanoke, Louisiana
- Coordinates: 30.9335°N 91.4551°W
- Area: 115 acres (47 ha)
- Built: 1800
- Built by: Peter Murray
- Architectural style: Greek Revival
- Restored: 1975
- Restored by: Koch and Wilson Architects
- NRHP reference No.: 77000680
- Added to NRHP: March 11, 1977

Live Oak is a former plantation in Weyanoke, West Feliciana Parish, Louisiana, United States. The Live Oak Plantation House is one of the first houses in the Felicianas, built in 1808 with Spanish-influenced architecture, predating the American annexation of the Republic of West Florida in 1810. It is listed on the National Register of Historic Places under the name "Live Oak," as of March 11, 1977.

== Background ==
In a Spanish land concession, Alexander Ross of Natchez acquired 1,000 acres of land in 1796 and in 1802, 115 acres were sold to Elijah Adams, becoming Live Oak plantation. Elijah Adams was a Captain in the Confederate States Army, in the 2nd Division, 10th and 20th Consolidated Regiments of and Concordia and the Feliciana Parishes. Adams hired Cyrus Ratliff to build the now historic Anglo-American plantation house at the center of the over 100-acre property in 1806. Adams fought in the battle of New Orleans and later died on January 20, 1816, at 46 years old.

On January 13, 1817, the plantation was sold to Amos Web, the husband of one of Adams' daughters, Charlotte. Seven years later, the property was acquired by Bennett Barrow who moved to Louisiana from North Carolina early in the 1800s. Barrow owned numerous plantations across the Feliciana Parishes. His family owned the Live Oak Plantation for over 100 years, as it was sold in 1928 to William J. Lesassier.

Bert S. Turner, for whom the Louisiana State University department of construction management is named, purchased the Live Oak plantation house in the late 1970s and began the restoration of the centrally located Anglo-American plantation house. Turner hired New Orleans Architects Koch and Wilson to oversee the project.

Throughout the plantation's over 200-year history, it has been used as a rent house, post office, schoolhouse, and apothecary store. The Live Oak plantation was listed on the National Register of Historic Places on March 11, 1977. The 155 acres (63 ha) historical area includes Little Bayou Sara and the abandoned old Tunica Road. The Live Oak plantation house is one of the earliest houses in Feliciana Parish and reflects the Anglo-American influence of the late eighteenth and early nineteenth centuries. The Live Oak plantation is currently owned by architect, Victor F. Trahan.

== See also ==
- National Register of Historic Places listings in West Feliciana Parish, Louisiana
- List of plantations in Louisiana
