= Stephen Doutreleau =

Stephen Doutreleau (born in France, 11 October 1693; date of death uncertain, after 1747, in France) was a French Jesuit missionary who ministered to Native Americans and colonists in present-day Illinois, Mississippi and Louisiana for 20 years.

== Life ==
He became a Jesuit novice at the age of twenty-two and migrated in 1727 to Louisiana, with a group of Ursuline nuns. Soon after his arrival, he was sent to the Illinois mission. In 1728 he was recorded at Post Vincennes, "the fort on the Wabash" [River], which was established about that time.

On 1 January 1730, Doutreleau set out for New Orleans on business connected with the mission. In the previous two months, the Natchez Indians had massacred all the inhabitants of the small French village of Natchez and the Yazoo, a neighboring Indian tribe, also attacked the French. Two Jesuit missionaries, Paul Du Poisson (resident priest of Arkansas Post who had been visiting Natchez) and Jean Rouel, were killed in these uprisings.

Ignorant of the hostilities and accompanied by four or five French voyageurs, Doutreleau landed at the mouth of the Yazoo River to offer up the Mass. The Yazoo attacked the small party, killing one of the Frenchmen and wounding the missionary. Doutreleau escaped to his canoe with two of his companions; they fled down the Mississippi. When they reached the French camp at Tunica Bay, their wounds were dressed. After a night's rest, they continued and made it to New Orleans without attacks. They had accomplished a journey of four hundred leagues through a hostile country.

Shortly after, Doutreleau became chaplain of the French colonial troops in Louisiana. He accompanied them on one expedition. At his own request, he was sent back to the Illinois Indians, but how long he remained in the Illinois Country is uncertain.

At one time Doutreleau was chaplain of the hospital at New Orleans. In 1747 he returned to France, after twenty years as a missionary in the Mississippi Valley.
