= Grace Episcopal Church (St. Francisville, Louisiana) =

- U.S. National Register of Historic Places
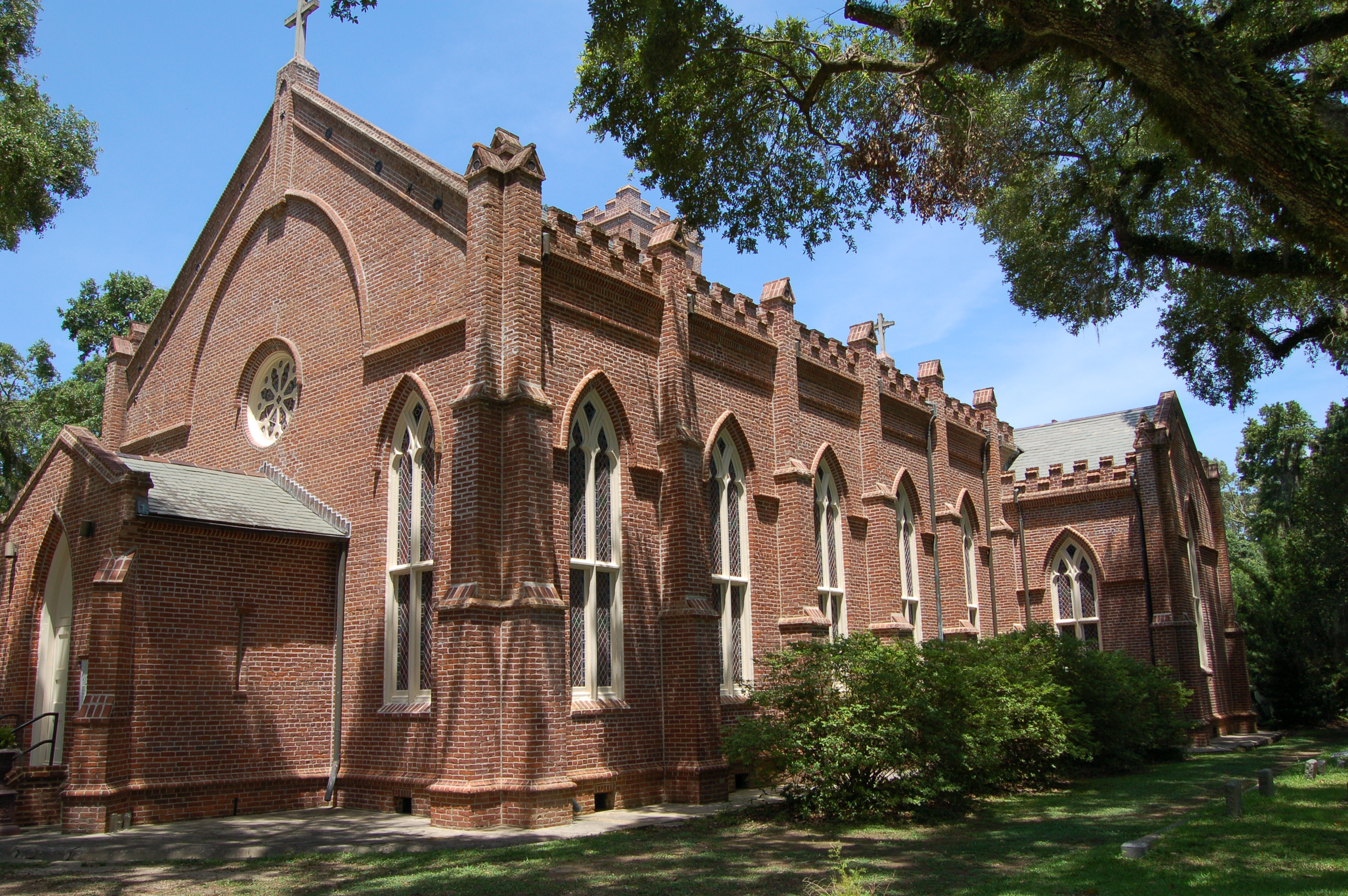

- Location within Louisiana Location within the United States
- Location: 510 Ferdinand St., St. Francisville, Louisiana
- Coordinates: 30°46′33″N 91°23′14″W
- Area: 9 acres (3.6 ha)
- Built: 1858
- Built by: Charles Nevitt Gibbons
- Architectural style: Gothic Revival
- NRHP reference No.: 79001102
- Added to NRHP: March 28, 1979

Grace Episcopal Church is an historic Episcopal church located at St. Francisville, West Feliciana Parish, Louisiana. The congregation was organized in 1827. The present church was completed in 1860, but it was heavily damaged by Union gunboats in 1863, during the Civil War.

The current appearance of the church dates to its repair and rebuilding in 1893. The organ dates to 1860. The church is one of the state's oldest Protestant churches.

== Notable burials ==
- Martha Hilliard Barrow Turnbull - owner of Rosedown Plantation
- Robert Hilliard Barrow - four-star General in the U.S. Marine Corps.
- John Bennett Dawson - 19th-century Louisiana Congressman.
- John Elliott Hart - Union Navy officer that died nearby on the Mississippi River; whose 1863 funeral has been commemorated, since 1999, with a festival, "The Day the War Stopped".
- Junius Wallace Jones - Major General, United States Air Force.
- Samuel Lawrason - state senator, author of the Lawrason Act of 1898.
- William Walter Leake - Confederate cavalry officer, who facilitated the Masonic burial of John E. Hart, above; later a state senator, circuit court judge, and newspaper publisher.
- George Mathews Jr. - presiding Judge of the Louisiana Supreme Court, 1813–1836.
- Joseph P. Newsham - 19th-century Congressman; he had served in the Union Army during the Civil War and moved to Louisiana after receiving disabling injuries.

== See also ==
- St. John's Episcopal Church (Laurel Hill, Louisiana): also NRHP-listed in West Feliciana Parish
- St. Mary's Episcopal Church (Weyanoke, Louisiana): also NRHP-listed in West Feliciana Parish
- National Register of Historic Places listings in West Feliciana Parish, Louisiana
