= Louisiana Highway 66 =

State highway in Louisiana, United States

Louisiana Highway 66
- Tunica Trace
- Route of LA 66 highlighted in red

Route information
- Maintained by Louisiana DOTD
- Length: 19.620 mi (31.575 km)
- Existed: 1955 renumbering–present
- Tourist routes: Louisiana Scenic Byway: Tunica Trace Byway

Major junctions
- West end: Begin state maintenance at Louisiana State Penitentiary in Angola
- East end: US 61 north of St. Francisville

Location
- Country: United States
- State: Louisiana
- Parishes: West Feliciana

Highway system
- Louisiana State Highway System; Interstate; US; State; Scenic
| ← US 65 | → LA 67 |
| ← SR 123 | SR 124 | → SR 125 |

Louisiana Highway 66 (LA 66) is a state highway located in southeastern Louisiana. It runs 19.62 miles (31.58 km) in a general east–west direction from the main entrance of the Louisiana State Penitentiary at Angola to a junction with U.S. Highway 61 (US 61) north of St. Francisville.

LA 66 winds through the scenic Tunica Hills of West Feliciana Parish and connects the prison facility with US 61, the main highway through the area. It is also steeped in history as the route is derived from an ancient Native American portage known as the Tunica Trace. The surrounding area contains burial mounds and other artifacts recalling this heritage. More recent historical sites include the antebellum Trudeau plantation located on the former site of a Tunica Indian village.

Several small rural communities are also located along LA 66, including Tunica, Retreat, and Weyanoke. LA 66 was designated in the 1955 Louisiana Highway renumbering, replacing former State Route 124. The route is also designated as the Tunica Trace Byway in the state's system of tourist routes known as the Louisiana Scenic Byways.

== Route description ==
From the west, LA 66 begins at the main entrance to the Louisiana State Penitentiary at Angola, formerly the site of a 19th century plantation now within the boundaries of the prison. The maximum security facility is located within a bend of Mississippi River in the northwestern corner of West Feliciana Parish near the Mississippi state line. LA 66 heads southeast through a thickly wooded rural area and passes through the tiny community of Tunica. The highway then curves to the northeast, passing between the north and south tracts of the Tunica Hills Wildlife Management Area.

After reaching a point about one mile (1.6 km) from the state line in an area known as Retreat, LA 66 curves back to the southeast and intersects LA 969, which connects to Pinckneyville, Mississippi. LA 66 maintains this general trajectory for the remainder of its route. Over the next 4.6 miles (7.4 km), the highway passes through the sparsely populated areas of Turnbull and Weyanoke before intersecting LA 968. This minor route leads to a point on the bank of the Mississippi River called Brandon.

LA 66 continues for another 6.4 miles (10.3 km), roughly following the east side of the serpentine Little Bayou Sara. It then bends eastward to cross the main branch of Bayou Sara, also known as Big Bayou Sara, by way of a pony truss bridge dating to the 1940s. LA 66 proceeds a short distance further to a junction with US 61 in the community of Bains. US 61 connects with Baton Rouge, the state capital, via St. Francisville to the south and Natchez, Mississippi to the north.

=== Route classification and data ===
LA 66 is an undivided two-lane highway for its entire length. The route is classified as a rural major collector by the Louisiana Department of Transportation and Development (La DOTD). Daily traffic volume in 2013 averaged 1,960 vehicles near the state penitentiary entrance, increasing to a peak 4,200 vehicles near the junction with US 61. The posted speed limit is 55 mph (90 km/h).

The entire route of LA 66 is known as the Tunica Trace Byway in the state-designated system of tourist routes known as the Louisiana Scenic Byways.

== History ==
=== Pre-1955 route numbering ===
State Route 124
- Location: Angola–Bains
- Length: 20.2 mi (32.5 km)
- Existed: 1926–1955

In the original Louisiana Highway system in use between 1921 and 1955, LA 66 was designated as State Route 124. It was an addition to the system that was designated in 1926 by an act of the state legislature.

Route 124. Beginning at Baines[sic] Station, Parish of West Feliciana on Route No. 3, thence running in a northwesterly direction to the town of Tunica, Louisiana, thence to Angola State Farm, and along the line as surveyed by the State Highway Commissioner.

— 1926 legislative route description

The Angola State Farm, now Louisiana State Penitentiary, began operations in the early 1900s. Its location was formerly the site of several 19th Century plantations on the east bank of the Mississippi River in West Feliciana Parish. The addition of Route 124 created a state-maintained access road from the prison to the main highway through the area, State Route 3, which became part of US 61 later the same year. Route 124 followed the existing Tunica Trace, an old Native American pathway that wound through the area's hilly terrain. A straighter path connecting more directly with the important town of St. Francisville was plotted and added to the state highway system in 1928 as State Route 325. However, it was never fully improved as a through route.

Route 124 was an unimproved dirt road when originally designated in 1926. The entire route was gravel surfaced by 1929 and then paved a decade later, in 1939. For most of its existence, Route 124 continued further into the prison grounds than the present LA 66. This extension paralleled the Louisiana and Arkansas Railway line which once traversed the property and crossed the Mississippi River by ferry into Pointe Coupee Parish. The route was truncated to its present terminus around 1953, shortly before the 1955 Louisiana Highway renumbering.

=== Post-1955 route history ===
LA 66 was created in 1955 as a direct renumbering of former Route 124.

La 66—From a point at or near the Angola Penal Farm through or near Tunica and Weynoke[sic] to a junction with La-US 61 at or near Baines[sic].

— 1955 legislative route description

Since then, the route has remained unchanged apart from reconstruction projects over the years which have straightened some of its sharper curves by cutting into the terrain. This is especially evident in Tunica, where a bypassed curve still exists as Crescent Road, and in the area immediately west of LA 969. The junction with US 61 has also been moved 0.2 miles (0.32 km) to the north with Parish Road 265 now following the original alignment there.

In 1988, the entire route of LA 66 was designated by the state legislature as the Tunica Trace Scenic Byway within the Louisiana Scenic Byways program. It was officially opened as a scenic route in October of that year with a dedication ceremony that included a representative of the Tunica-Biloxi Indian Tribe. The government of West Feliciana Parish also changed the highway's local name from the generic "Angola Road" to "Tunica Trace" to highlight the route's history.

== Major intersections ==
The entire highway is in West Feliciana Parish.

| Location | mi | km | Destinations | Notes |
|---|---|---|---|---|
| Angola | 0.000 | 0.000 | Begin state maintenance at Louisiana State Penitentiary entrance | Western terminus; located 0.1 miles (0.16 km) from Tunica |
| Retreat | 7.122 | 11.462 | LA 969 – Pinckneyville | Southern terminus of LA 969 |
| | 11.741 | 18.895 | LA 968 | Eastern terminus of LA 968 |
| | 18.121– 18.255 | 29.163– 29.379 | Bridge over Bayou Sara | |
| Bains | 19.620 | 31.575 | US 61 – Baton Rouge, Natchez | Eastern terminus |
1.000 mi = 1.609 km; 1.000 km = 0.621 mi
