= Trudeau Landing =

Archaeological site in Louisiana, US

Trudeau Landing site
- Tunica village
- Cultures: Tunica people
- Location: Tunica, Louisiana, West Feliciana Parish, Louisiana, USA
- Region: West Feliciana Parish, Louisiana

History
- Built: 1731
- Abandoned: 1764

Site notes
- Excavation dates: 1970s
- Trudeau Landing
- U.S. National Register of Historic Places
- Area: 26 acres (11 ha)
- Built: 1731
- Architectural style: Native American village and burial site
- NRHP reference No.: 77000679
- Added to NRHP: June 17, 1977

The Trudeau Landing site (16 WF 25), also known as Tunica Village and Trudeau, is an archaeological site in Tunica, unincorporated West Feliciana Parish, Louisiana, United States. It was once occupied by the Tunica tribe. Later European settlers developed it into the Trudeau Plantation.

== Tunica Treasure ==
In the 1960s, a guard at the local Louisiana State Prison (Angola) and self-described treasure hunter dug up graves at the site. He removed hundreds of artifacts from the area, which had been deposited as grave goods with the more than 100 graves. The Tunica felt that he had stolen tribal heirlooms and desecrated the graves of their ancestors and were outraged at the violations. He tried to sell the artifacts to the Peabody Museum of Archaeology and Ethnology at Harvard University, but the transaction stalled when the museum found that he did not have legal title to the items.

In the 1970s, archaeologists excavated the site and uncovered large amounts of pottery, European trade goods, and other artifacts deposited as grave goods by the Tunica from 1731 to 1764 when they were in residence.

The treasure-hunter sued the landowner to claim the artifacts were his in Carrier v. Bell. The court ruled that the artifacts were buried in graves, not abandoned, and so belonged to the Tunica tribe.

A decade passed in the courts, but the ruling became a landmark in Native American history, and it helped lay the groundwork for new U.S. federal legislation, the Native American Graves Protection and Repatriation Act, passed in 1990. It was also used to prove the early heritage of the Tunica peoples, and helped them to gain state and federal recognition.

The Tunica-Biloxi Indian Tribe built a museum to house the artifacts in Marksville, Louisiana. They are using it also as a conservation and education center to preserve their artifacts.

== See also ==
- Bloodhound Site
- Trudeau House
- National Register of Historic Places listings in West Feliciana Parish, Louisiana
