= Afton Villa Gardens =

Formal garden in Louisiana, U.S.

- U.S. National Register of Historic Places
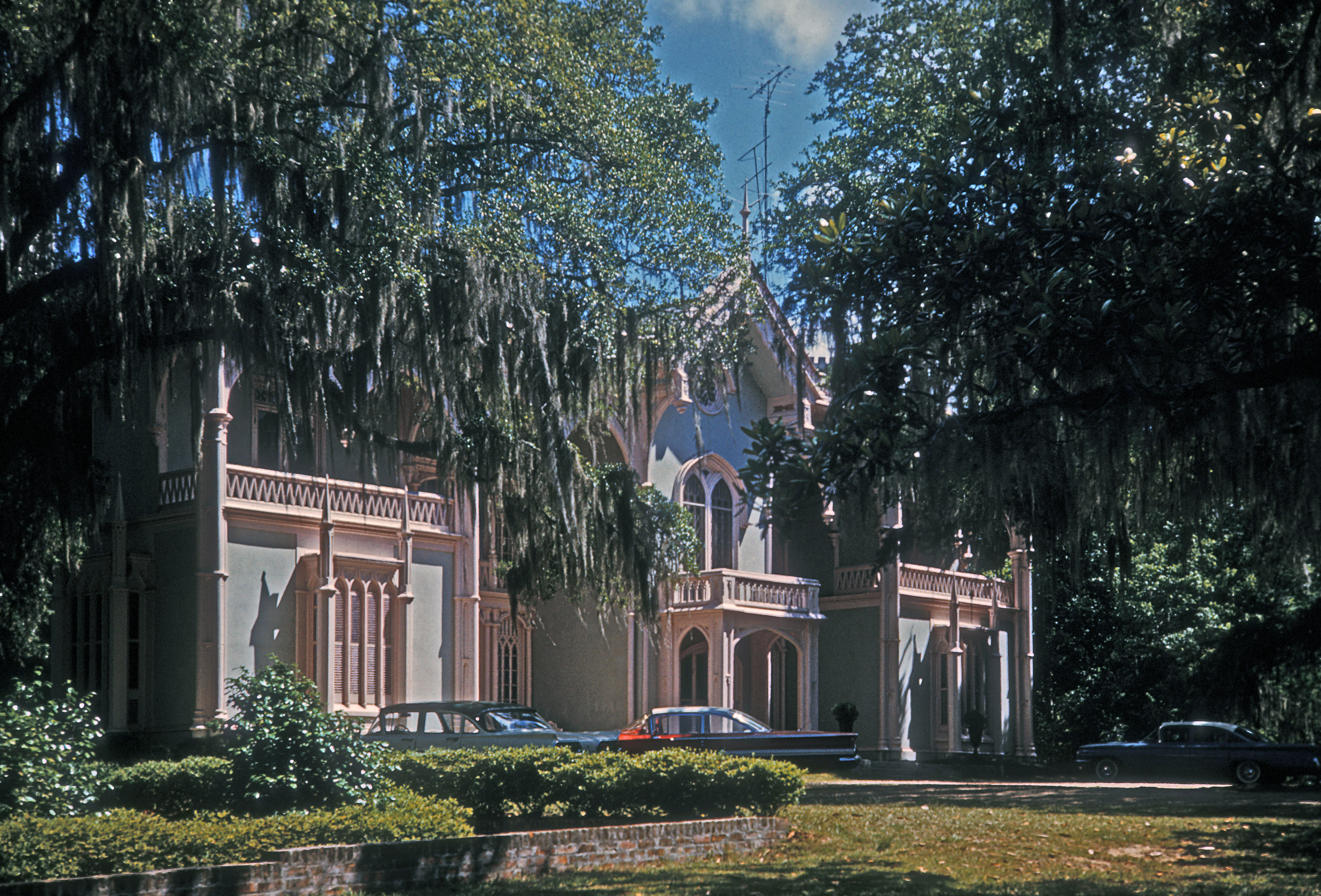
- Afton Villa, prior to its destruction by fire

- Location within Louisiana
- Nearest city: St. Francisville, Louisiana
- Area: 140 acres (57 ha)
- Built: 1849
- NRHP reference No.: 83000554
- Added to NRHP: February 24, 1983

Afton Villa Gardens is a historic formal garden established in the mid-nineteenth century in St. Francisville, Louisiana, U.S.

== History ==
The land belonged to William Barrow when it was purchased by his brother, Bartholomew Barrow, in 1820. The latter sold it to his son, David Barrow, in 1839. When Senator Alexander Barrow died in 1846, he was buried on the grounds. In 1849, David Barrow and his second wife, Susan A. Woolfolk, had a great house built. It was designed in the Gothic Revival architectural style. Meanwhile, they also designed formal gardens.

The mansion burned down in 1963, but the gardens are still maintained. They have been listed on the National Register of Historic Places since February 24, 1983.

== See also ==
- Residence Plantation House: owned by family member Roberta Barrow
- National Register of Historic Places listings in West Feliciana Parish, Louisiana
