= 3 V Tourist Court =

- U.S. National Register of Historic Places
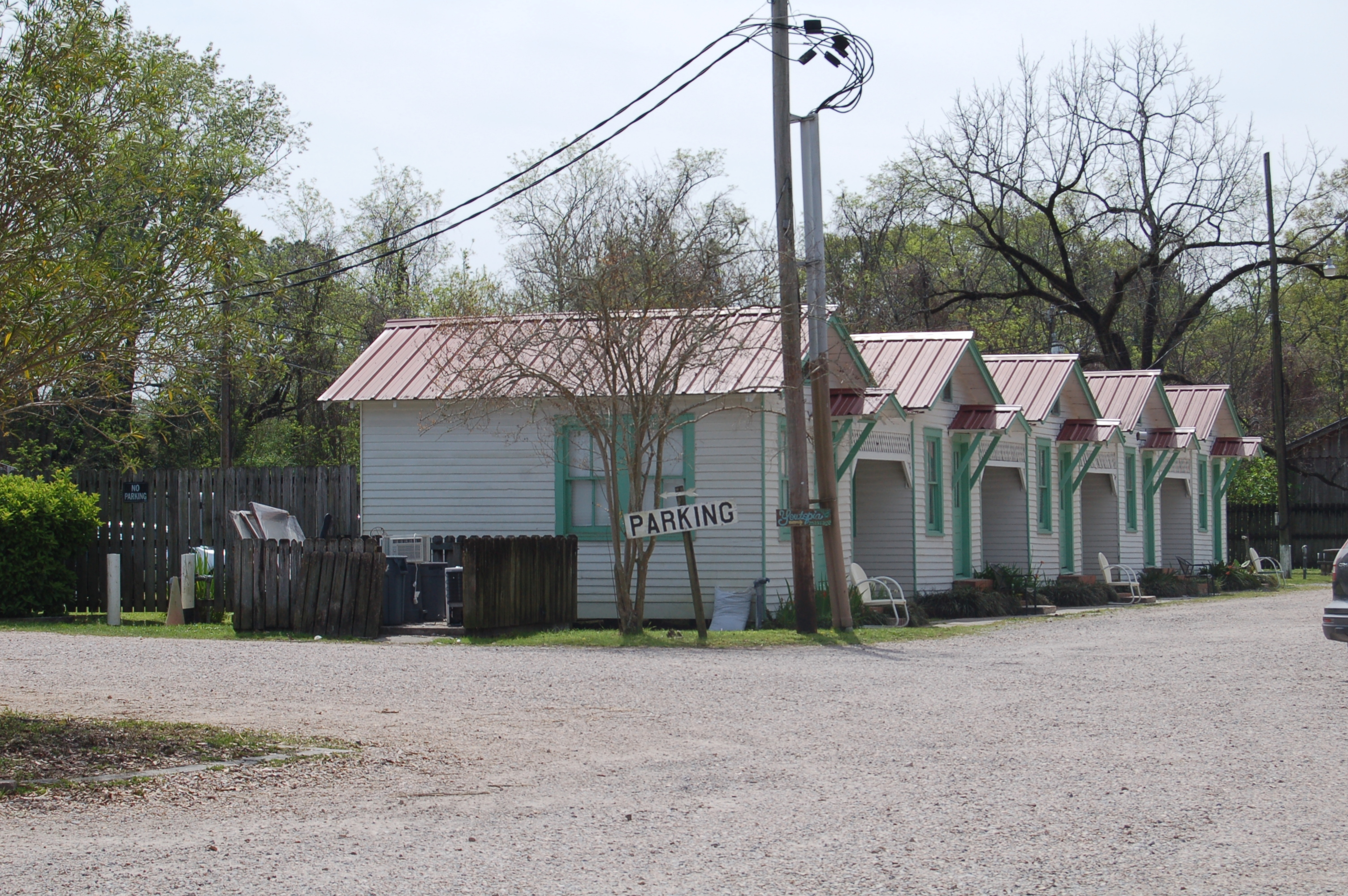

- Location within Louisiana Location within the United States
- Location: 5687 Commerce St., St. Francisville, Louisiana
- Coordinates: 30°46′45″N 91°22′32.6″W
- Area: 0.6 acres (0.24 ha)
- Architectural style: Bungalow/craftsman
- NRHP reference No.: 92001832
- Added to NRHP: January 21, 1993

The 3 V Tourist Court in St. Francisville in West Feliciana Parish, Louisiana was built in 1938. It listed on the National Register of Historic Places in 1993. It was originally listed with an address of 111 E. Commerce St., which is not found on current maps.

The complex has six small wood frame rental units reflecting Craftsman style, plus a manager's house and three non-contributing units.
