= Tunica people =

Native American tribes, Mississippi valley

Tunica
Tayoroniku
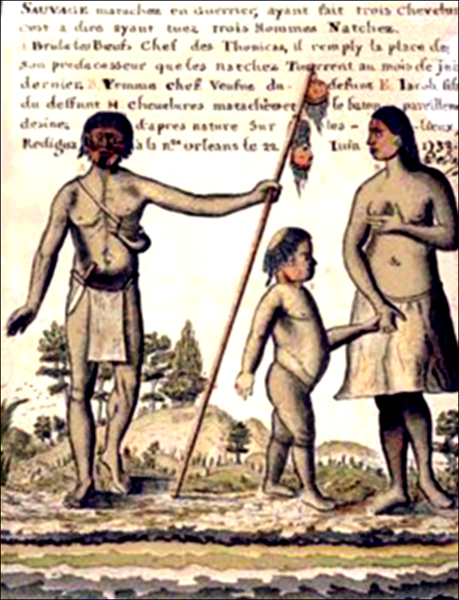
- Tunica chief, Brides les Boefs (translated as Buffalo Tamer), holding a staff with three Natchez scalps, their enemies and the son and wife of the slain chief Cahura-Joligo, 1732

Regions with significant populations
- United States (Mississippi, Arkansas, Louisiana)

Languages
- Tunica language (isolate)

Religion
- Native tribal religion

Related ethnic groups
- Yazoo, Koroa, Tioux

The Tunica people (Tunica: Tayoroniku) are a group of linguistically and culturally related Native American tribes in the Mississippi River Valley, which include the Tunica (also spelled Tonica, Tonnica, and Thonnica); the Yazoo; the Koroa (Akoroa, Courouais); and possibly the Tioux. They first encountered Europeans in 1541 – members of the Hernando de Soto expedition.

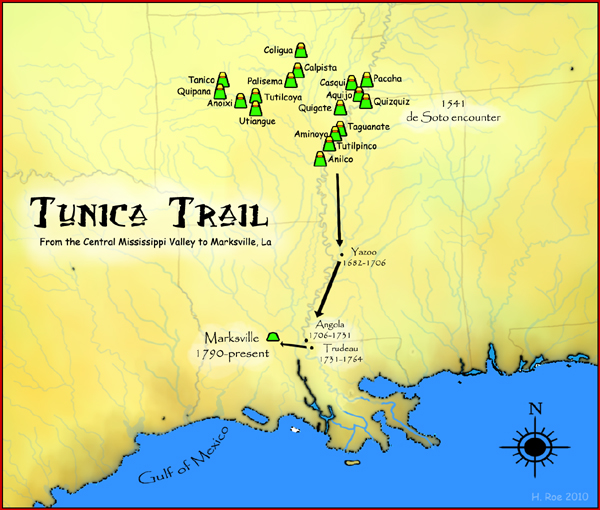
Tunica Trail from the central Mississippi Valley to Marksville, Louisiana

The Tunica language is an isolate.

Over the next centuries, under pressure from hostile neighbors, the Tunica migrated south from the Central Mississippi Valley to the Lower Mississippi Valley. Eventually they moved westward and settled around present-day Marksville, Louisiana.

Since the early 19th century, they have intermarried with the Biloxi tribe, an unrelated Siouan-speaking people from the vicinity of Biloxi, Mississippi and shared land. Remnant peoples from other small tribes also merged with them. In 1981 they were federally recognized and now call themselves the Tunica-Biloxi Indian Tribe; they have a reservation in Avoyelles Parish, Louisiana.

== Prehistory ==
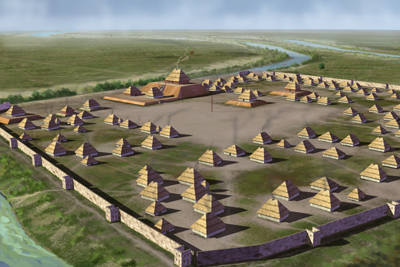
The Parkin site, circa 1539. Illustration by Herb Roe

By the Middle Mississippian period, local Late Woodland peoples in the Central Mississippi Valley had developed or adopted a full Mississippian lifestyle, with intensive maize agriculture, hierarchical political structures, mussel shell-tempered pottery and participation in the Southeastern Ceremonial Complex (SECC). At this time the settlement patterns were a mix of dispersed settlements, farmsteads and villages. Over the next centuries, settlement patterns changed to a pattern of more centralized towns, with defensive palisades and ditches, indicating a state of endemic warfare had developed between local competing polities. Material culture, such as pottery styles and mortuary practices, began to diverge at this point.

The archaeological evidence suggests that the Mississippi valley was home to several competing paramount chiefdoms, with supporting vassal states, all belonging to the same overall culture. The groups in the area are defined by archaeologists as archaeological phases, based on differentiation in these material cultures. They include the Menard, Tipton, Belle Meade-Walls, Parkin and Nodena phases. In the immediate vicinity of the future city of Memphis, Tennessee, two phases seem to have been paramount chiefdoms: Parkin and Nodena. The other phases were possible vassal states or allies in their competition for local supremacy.

The Parkin phase is centered on the Parkin site, a 17 acres (7 ha) palisaded village at the confluence of the St. Francis and Tyronza rivers. The large village was likely located at the confluence of the two rivers because the site enabled residents to control transportation and trade on the waterways.

The Nodena phase is believed to have been centered on the Bradley Site (3 Ct 7) and its nearby cluster of towns and villages. It is named for the Nodena site, located east of Wilson, Arkansas in Mississippi County on a meander bend of the Mississippi River. Scholars believe that because of pottery and mortuary similarities, the Belle Mead and Walls phase peoples were allies or vassals of the Nodena polity. The Parkin polity, defined by different mortuary practices and pottery, was competing.

== Protohistoric period ==
=== Spanish contact ===
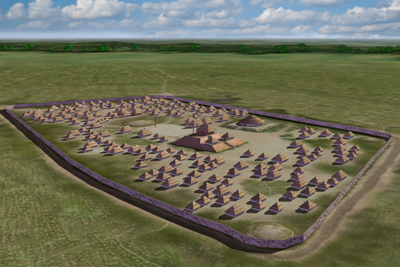
Illustration of the Nodena site

One mid-day we came upon a town called Quizquiz, and so suddenly to inhabitants, that they were without any notice of us, the men being away at work in the maize-fields. We took more than three hundred women, and the few skins and shawls they had in their houses.

— Luys Hernandez de Biedma describing the Quizquiz 1544

In the spring of 1541 Hernando de Soto and his army approached the eastern bank of the Mississippi River, coming upon the Province of Quizquiz (pronounced "keys-keys"). These people spoke a dialect of the Tunican language. At that time, these related groups covered a large region extending along both sides of the Mississippi River in present-day Mississippi and Arkansas.

Off to one side of the town was the dwelling place of the Curaca (chief). It was situated on a high mound which now served as a fortress. Only by means of two stairways could one ascend to this house…… The lord of the province, who like his land was called Quizquiz, was now old and sick in bed; but on hearing the noise and confusion in his village, he arose and came from his bedchamber. Then beholding the pillage and seizure of his vassals, he grasped a battle-ax and began to descend the stairs with the greatest fury, in the meantime vowing loudly and fiercely to slay anyone who came into his land without permission……But the memory of valiant deeds and triumphs of his bellicose youth, and the fact that he held sway over a province so large and good as his, gave him strength to utter those fierce threats and even fiercer ones.

— Inca Garcilaso de la Vega describing the Quizquiz 1605

Upon crossing the river, the expedition came upon the Province of Aquixo, and from there on to the Province of Casqui. The province had a long-standing feud with the Province of Pacaha, described by its participants as having lasted for generations. The Spaniards were impressed with the peoples of this region, its many towns, abundant agriculture and fine quality of the people. The settlements of this area are described thus by the admiring Spaniards:

This town was a very good one, thoroughly well stockaded; and the walls were furnished with towers and a ditch round about, for the most part full of water which flows in by a canal from the river; and this ditch was full of excellent fish of divers kinds. The chief of Casqui came to the Christians when they were entering the village and they entertained him bravely. In Aquixo, and Casqui, and Pacaha, they saw the best villages seen up to that time, better stockaded and fortified, and the people were of finer quality, excepting those of Cofitachequi.

— Rodrigo Ranjel describing the Casqui 1547–49

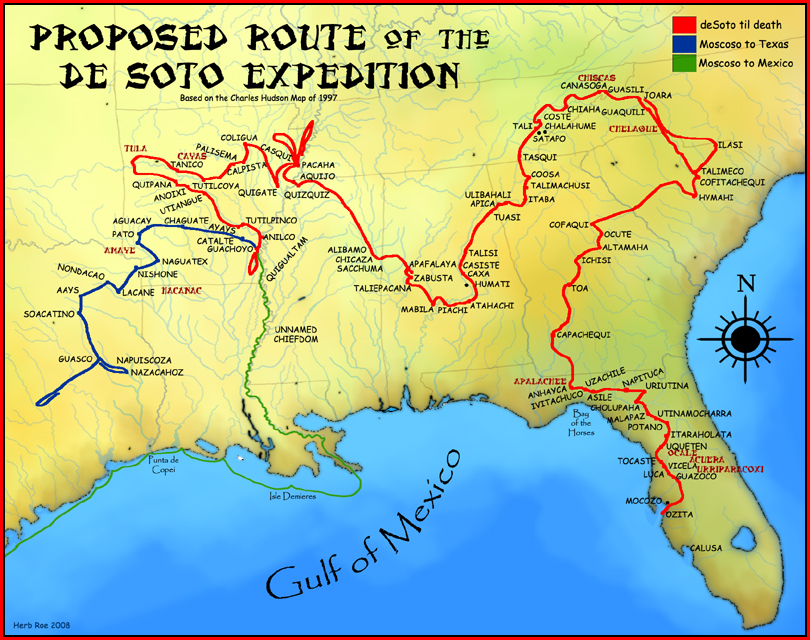
Proposed route for the de Soto Expedition, based on Charles M. Hudson map of 1997.

The expedition later visited the Province of Quigate, the Province of Coligua and Palisema. The chief of Palisema sent the expedition on to the land of the Cayas, where they found the town of Tanico. Linguistic analysis in the 1930s by John Swanton and in the 1980s by Robert L. Rankin point to the Koroa tribe as likely to have been the Coligua.

Archaeologists believe the location for the Province of Coligua may be the Greenbriar phase on the White River at the edge of the Ozark Highlands. Europeans also called the settlement Tanico, which is another name later applied to the Tunica, also making its identification as a Tunican group secure. The Tanico were salt-makers and salt-traders, procuring the salt from the sands of a stream that fed into the River of the Cayas (later identified as the Arkansas River). The people would scoop the sand in baskets, and run water through it, making a brine. The brine was strained and left to dry in shallow bowls, where the dried salt was later scraped off.

Scholars have evaluated the three surviving Soto narratives for topography, linguistics and cultural traits, combined with the results of archaeological excavations and analysis. Most archaeologists and ethnohistorians believe the following can be identified as equivalent sites: they are paired by archaeological phase and Soto references: Menard phase = Anilco, Walls phase = Quizquiz, Belle Meade phase = Aquixo, Parkin phase = Casqui, and Nodena phase = Pacaha.

The description of the ongoing war between the Casqui and Pacaha matches interpretations of the archaeological record, as do distances and topography mentioned in the narratives. Words recorded by the narratives at Pacaha, such as mochila, macanoche, and caloosa, match Tunica linguistic characteristics evaluated by Mary Haas in the 1940s. It is now theorized that the peoples of the Central Mississippi Valley, from Pacaha in the north to the Provinces of Anilco and Utiangüe in the south on the Arkansas River, were all Tunican.

=== French contact ===
It was another 150 years before another European group recorded the Tunica. In 1699 when encountered by the LaSource expedition (coming downriver from Canada), the Tunica were a modest-sized tribe numbering only a few hundred warriors, with about 900 people in total. While the Spanish had been in their territory only for a short time, their encounter had devastating effects. The accidental introduction of Eurasian infectious diseases, such as smallpox, ravaged the native populations, who had no acquired immunity. In addition, the expedition had played off local political rivalries, causing more conflict.

By the time the French arrived, the Central Mississippi Valley was sparsely occupied by the Quapaw, a Dhegiha Siouan-speaking people hostile to the Tunica. In the intervening century and a half since the de Soto Expedition, the Tunica and Koroa had relocated further south to the mouth of the Yazoo River in west central Mississippi.

== Historic period ==
=== Mouth of the Yazoo 1682–1706 ===
We arrived at the Tonicas about sixty leagues below the Ankanseas (Quapaw ). The first village is four leagues from the Mississippi inland on the bank of a quite pretty river; they are dispersed in little villages; they cover in all four leagues of country; they are about 260 cabins…. They are very peaceable people, well disposed, much attached to the French, living entirely on Indian corn, they are employed solely on their fields; they do not hunt like the other Indians.

— La Source describing the Tunica 1699

The French established a mission among the Tunica around the year 1700, on the Yazoo River near the Mississippi River in the present-day state of Mississippi. Archaeological evidence suggests that the Tunica had recently migrated to the region from eastern Arkansas, in the late 17th century. Father Antoine Davion was assigned as the missionary for the Tunica, as well as for the smaller tribes of the Koroa, the Yazoo, and Couspe (or Houspe) tribes. Unlike the northern tribes with which the French were familiar, the Tunica (and the nearby Taensa and Natchez) had a complex religion. They had built temples, created cult images, and had a priest class. The Tunica, Taensa, and Natchez retained chiefdom characteristics, such as a complex religion and, in the case of the Natchez, use and maintenance of platform mounds, after they had disappeared elsewhere. Paul du Poisson reported that regional tribes such as the Taensa and Natchez kept an eternal flame in their villages, and that when it went out, they would visit the Tunica to replenish it.

Several characteristics linked the Tunica to groups encountered by de Soto: their emphasis on agriculture; cultivation by men rather than women (as de Soto noted when describing Quizquiz); trade; and manufacture and distribution of salt, a valuable item to both native and Europeans. The trade in salt was an ancient profession among the Tunica, as evidenced by de Soto's noting salt production when visiting the village of Tanico. Salt was extremely important in the trade between the French and the various Caddoan groups in northwestern Louisiana and southwestern Arkansas. Scholars believe the Tunica were middlemen in the movement of salt from the Caddoan areas to the French.

=== Angola 1706–1731 ===
By the early 18th century, Chickasaw raided the Indian tribes along the lower Mississippi River to capture people for the Indian slave trade in South Carolina. They took an estimated 1,000 to 2,000 captives from the Tunica, Taensa, and Quapaw tribes during this period.

By 1706 the Tunica decided to move again. With their enemies the Natchez to their immediate south, they decided to move further, across the Mississippi and south to its confluence with the Red River, the next major river junction. This location enabled them to keep control of their salt trade, as the Red River also connected to their salt source in the Caddoan areas. They established a loose collection of hamlets and villages at their new home in present-day Angola, Louisiana.

In the early 20th century, Angola was developed as the site of the Louisiana State Penitentiary. In 1967, a corrections officer at the Louisiana State Penitentiary discovered the remains of a small hamlet at this site. The archeological site is now known as the Bloodhound Site.

During the 1710s and 1720s, war broke out four times between the French and the Natchez. The French called these the First Natchez War (1716), the Second Natchez War (1722), the Third Natchez War (1723), and the Natchez Rebellion of 1729. The last was the most widespread war; the Natchez attacked and killed many of the French in Natchez territory; in retaliation, the French gained the Choctaw as allies, eventually defeating the Natchez people. Of those who survived, thousands were sold into slavery and sent to the Caribbean, where the French had plantations on Saint-Domingue and Guadeloupe.

In November 1729 the French commander Sieur de Chépart ordered the Natchez to vacate one of their villages so that he could use its land for a new tobacco plantation. The chiefs of the village sent emissaries to potential allies, including the Yazoo, Koroa, Illinois, Chickasaw, and Choctaw. They also sent messages to the African slaves of nearby French plantations, inviting them to join the Natchez in rising up against the French. In November 1729, the Natchez attacked. Before the day was over, they destroyed the entire French colony at Natchez, including Fort Rosalie. Over 200 colonists, mostly French men, were killed and more than 300 women, children, and slaves were taken captive. War continued until January 1731, when the French captured a Natchez fort on the west side of the Mississippi River. Between 75 and 250 Natchez warriors escaped and found refuge among the Chickasaw. The young Great Sun and about 100 of his followers were captured, subsequently enslaved, and shipped to work French plantations in the Caribbean. The Natchez Rebellion expanded into a larger regional conflict with many repercussions. The Yazoo and Koroa Indians had allied with the Natchez and suffered their fate. The Tunica were initially reluctant to fight on either side. In June 1730 the Head Chief of the Tunica, Cahura-Joligo, agreed to let a small party of Natchez refugees settle near his village, with the provision that they should do so unarmed. He received thirty Natchez warriors into his village, after disarming them.

A few days later, the last chief of the Natchez arrived at the Tunica village with a hundred men, and an unknown number of women and children. They also concealed Chickasaw and Koroa in the canebrake around the village. Cahura-Joligo informed them that he could not receive them unless they gave up their arms. They replied that this was their intention, but asked if they could keep them awhile longer so their women did not get the impression that their unarmed men were prisoners. He consented to their request and proceeded to distribute food to his new guests. A celebratory dance was held till after midnight, when the Tunica retired to their cabins, thinking that the Natchez would do the same. The Natchez, Chicasaw and Koroa, attacked their hosts in their cabins, and killed all they managed to surprise while asleep. Cahura-Joligo killed four Natchez during the fighting, but was eventually killed along with twelve of his warriors. His war-chief Brides les Boeufs (Buffalo Tamer), with a dozen of his warriors, repulsed the attack and retook the Head Chief's cabin. He rallied his remaining warriors and, after fighting for five days and nights without interruption, regained control of the village. Twenty Tunica were killed and as many wounded in the fighting. They had killed 33 Natchez warriors and took three prisoners. Later they burned them in ritual punishment for the attack.

=== Trudeau Landing 1731–1764 ===
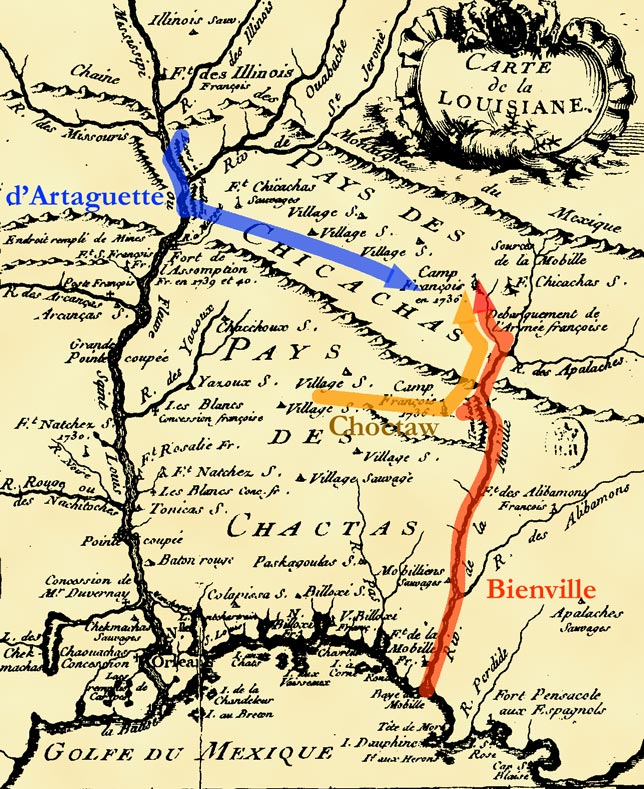
"Carte de la Louisiane" of Dumont de Montigny (1753). Shows the 1736 location of the Tunica.

After the attack and plundering of their village at Angola, in 1731 the Tunica moved a few miles away to the Trudeau site in West Feliciana Parish. The Tunica continued to prosper, practicing their vocation as traders and middlemen. They expanded on a relatively new business as horse traders. For at least a decade, the French had become dependent on the Tunica for supplying the valuable animals.

The chief received us very politely; he was dressed in the French fashion, and seemed to be not at all uneasy in that habit. Of all the savages of Canada (New France) there is none so depended on by our commandants as this chief. He loves our nation, and has no cause to repent of the services he has rendered it. He trades with the French, whom he supplies with horses and fowls, and he understands his trade very well. He has learned of us to hoard up money, and he reckoned very rich.

— Father Charlevoix describing a meeting with Cahura-Joligo in 1721

Because of the expense of shipping horses from France, the French found it cheaper to buy them in La Louisiane from the Tunica. They acquired the horses through a native trade network which had its origin in the Spanish colony of Mexico. The Tunica stayed at this location into the 1760s, when the French ceded control to the Spanish following the French defeat by the English in the Seven Years' War.

Proof of the tribe's prosperity during these years was revealed in the 1960s when the Trudeau site was discovered and excavated. Large amounts of European trade goods, including beads, porcelain, muskets, kettles and other items, as well as locally produced pottery in the Tunica tribal style, were buried as grave goods at the site. What has been called the "Trudeau Treasure" was the greatest amount of European trade goods found at any Native American site of this period.

The tribe's warriors and their allies attacked a British flotilla that came up the Mississippi River from New Orleans on March 15, 1764 at a bend in the river at Davion's Bluff.

=== Pointe Coupee 1764 to the early 1790s ===
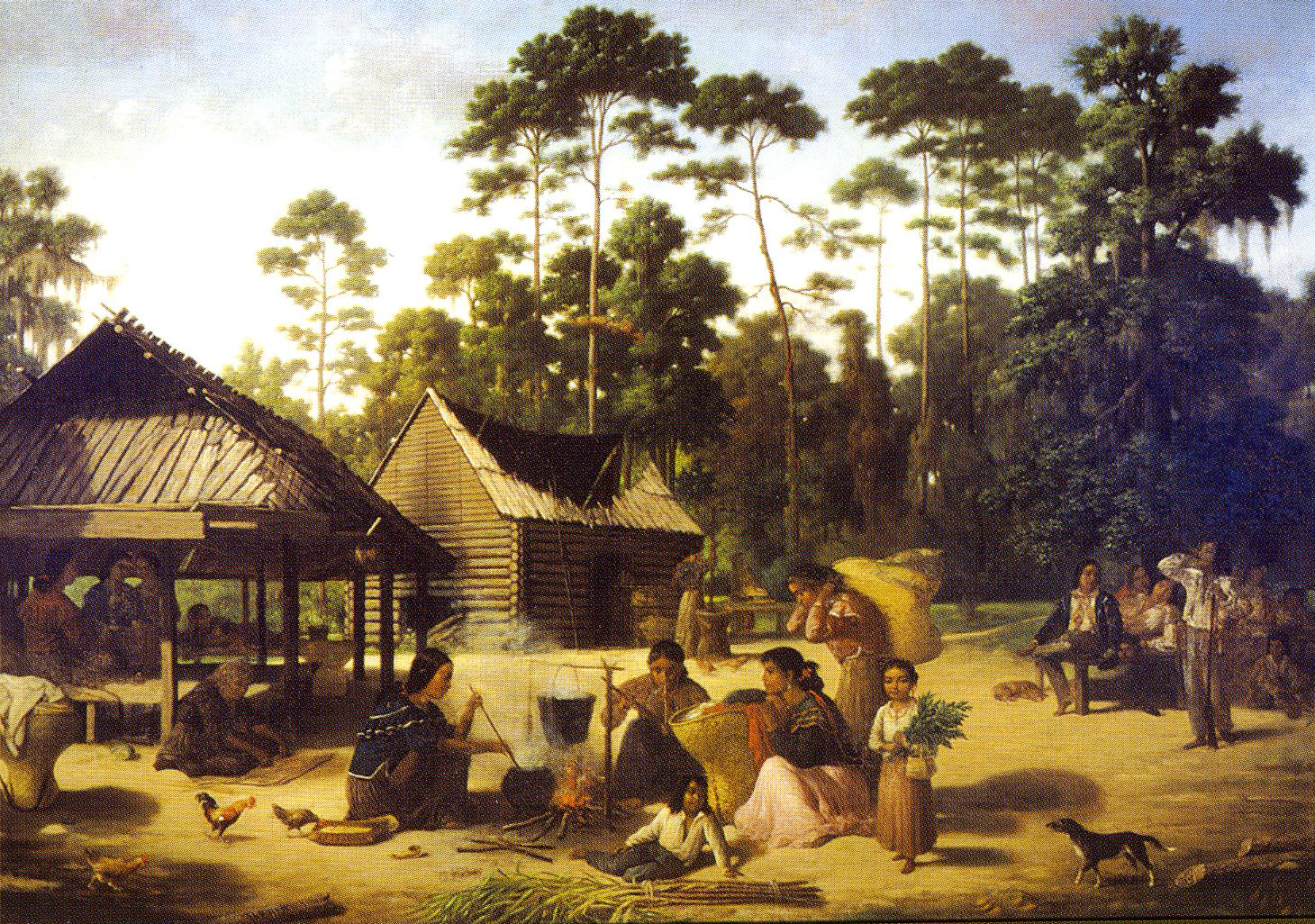
Choctaw village in Louisiana similar to Tunica villages of the time (François Bernard, 1869)

In 1764, the Tunica moved fifteen miles (24 km) south of the Trudeau Landing site to just outside the French settlement at Pointe Coupée. (Due to shifting of the Mississippi River, this area has eroded and the settlement was lost.) Other Native tribes had also settled in the area, including the Ofo, Pascagoula and the Siouan-speaking Biloxi. The latter came to have a long-term relationship with the Tunica. (After years of intermarriage, in 1981 the tribes gained federal recognition as the Tunica-Biloxi Nation of Louisiana.)

The Tunica began to rely more on hunting for their sustenance than farming, and often worked for Europeans as hunters or guides. During the late 18th century, numerous Anglo-American settlers entered the region from the American Southeast. The Tunica had become acculturated to European ways, although they still tattooed themselves and practiced some of their native religious customs. Their Head Chief during these years was Lattanash, with the elder Brides les Boefs continuing as the War Chief. The Ofo, Perruquier, was the spokesman for his tribe. By this time, his people had largely assimilated into the Tunica. With the British in charge of the Western Florida colony east of the Mississippi River, and the Spanish in control of Louisiana, it was a volatile time politically for the area.

Both groups vied for the allegiance of the Tunica, with the Spanish usually winning. In 1779 Governor Galvez led a force that included Tunica and other tribes to take the British-held town of Baton Rouge. It is the last recorded military campaign in which the Tunica are documented.

By sometime in the late 1780s or 1790s, the Tunica had decided to move again, probably because of the large influx of Anglo-Americans. They moved west to a site on the Red River occupied by the Avoyels, where they were subsequently granted land by the Spanish. Other tribes also settled in the area, such as the Ofo, and Biloxi. In 1794 a Sephardic Jewish immigrant from Venice, Italy, named Marco Litche (the French recorded him as Marc Eliche), established a trading post in the area. The settlement he founded became known as Marksville. It was noted on Louisiana maps as of 1809, after the United States acquired the territory by the Louisiana Purchase.

=== Marksville to the present ===
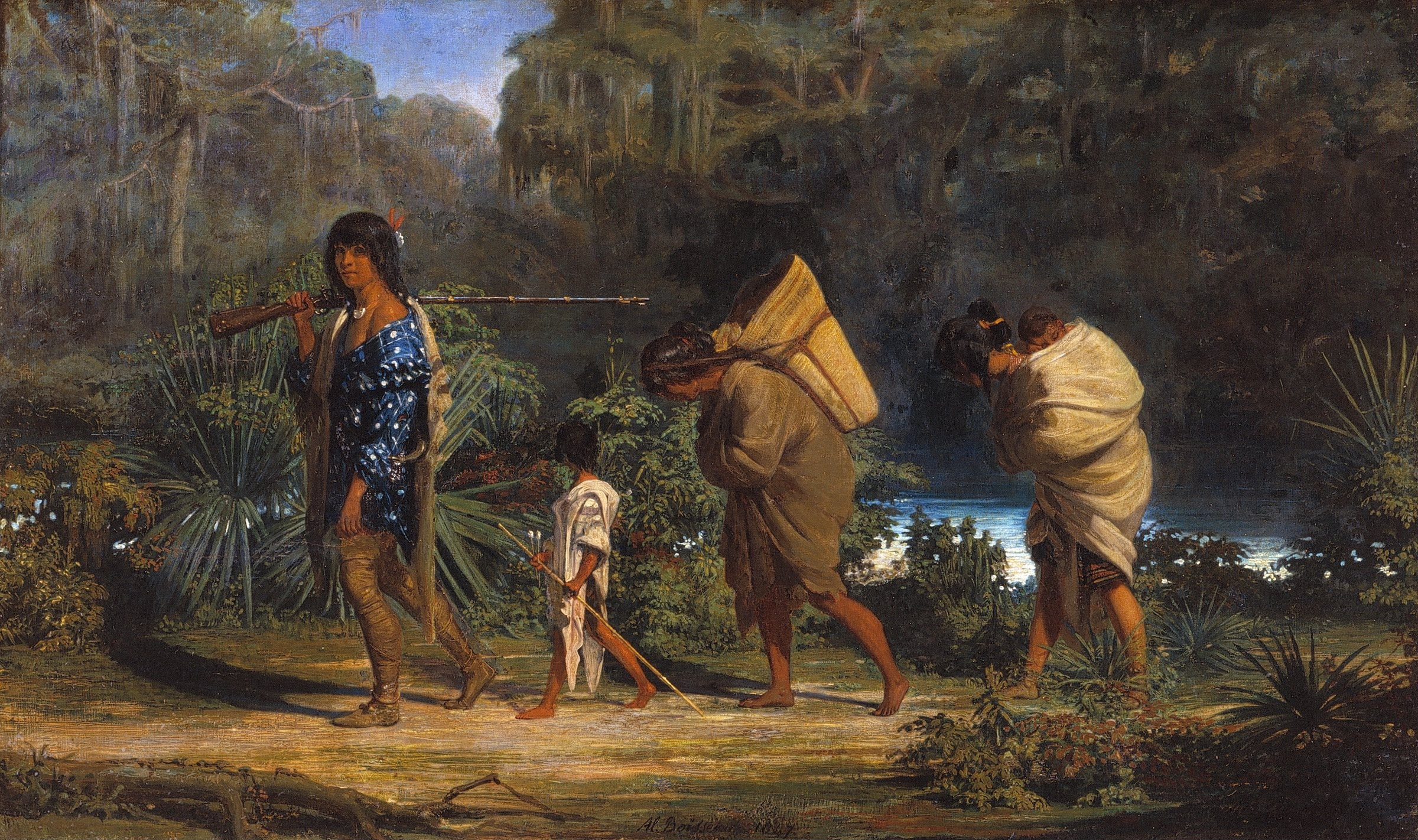
Louisiana Indians Walking Along a Bayou (Alfred Boisseau, 1847)

When the Tunica settled at what became Marksville, the Red River was still an important avenue of trade. By the late 19th century, railroads surpassed the rivers as the main means of transportation, and the Marksville area became a quiet backwater. Many small and peaceful tribes such as the Tunica were forgotten. The more bellicose tribes in the west took the attention of the United States as it expanded into their territories. The only U.S. Government mention of the Tunica from 1803 to 1938 was made in 1806 by an Indian Commissioner for Louisiana, who remarked that the Tunica numbered only about 25 men, lived in Avoyelles Parish and made their livings by occasionally hiring out as boatmen. Documents from the early 19th century record a second Tunica village with its own chief, located on Bayou Rouge, during the Tunicas' early years in Avoyelles Parish. Some Tunica moved west to Texas and Oklahoma, where they were absorbed by other Native groups.

Although the Tunica were prosperous at this time, eventually problems with their white neighbors would take its toll. The Indian Removal Act of 1830, signed by President Andrew Jackson, forced all of the major tribes east of the Mississippi River to be removed from their lands and relocated to reservations west of the river, or leave their tribes and accept US citizenship. This resulted in the infamous Trail of Tears for many of the Southeast natives, including the Five Civilized Tribes. Although the Tunica were not removed to Indian Territory, all Native Americans were under pressure. In 1841 the Tunica chief Melancon attempted to pull up fence posts fraudulently erected on Tunica land by an American trying to steal tribal land. The man, a local leader of the "Indian Patrol", shot Chief Melancon in the head in full view of other Tunica. He was not prosecuted by local authorities and succeeded in stealing the land from the Tunica.

After the Chief's death, the tribe kept the identity of the next chief a close secret for many years to avoid notice by unscrupulous neighbors. The Tunica became subsistence farmers, with some hunting and fishing to support themselves. Others turned to sharecropping on their white neighbors' lands. No longer prosperous, they managed to eke out a living through the 19th century. In the 1870s their chief, Volsin Chiki, helped reunite the tribe. He also encouraged revival of ancient tribal ceremonies, such as the Corn Feast.

As the 20th century dawned, the Tunica continued. They had managed to retain possession of the majority of their land, because it was held and worked in common by the whole tribe. Some still spoke the Tunica language, and their reinvigorated tribal ceremonies were practiced. Gradually, the Tunica merged with and absorbed other local groups (the Ofo, Avoyel, and Biloxi). The Tunica-Biloxi finally achieved federal recognition in 1981. They have maintained their tribal government, and the chieftainship existed up to the mid-1970s.

== Modern tribe ==
The modern "Tunica-Biloxi Indian Tribe" live in Mississippi and east central Louisiana. The modern tribe is composed of Tunica, Biloxi (a Siouan-speaking people from the Gulf coast), Ofo (also a Siouan people), Avoyel (a Natchezan people), Mississippi Choctaw (formerly Muskogean-speaking), European and African ancestry. Many live on the Tunica-Biloxi Indian Reservation in central Avoyelles Parish, just south of the city of Marksville, Louisiana. A part of the city extends onto reservation land. The reservation has a land area of 1.682 square kilometres (0.649 sq mi; 416 acres).

They operate Louisiana's first land-based casino, Paragon Casino Resort, opened in Marksville in June 1994. The tribe operates the casino to generate revenues to members, as well as to use some of their earnings for other economic development. It has also used these funds to fight for Native American rights. The 2000 census notes that 648 persons self-identified as Tunica.

Tribal government consists of an elected tribal council and tribal chairman. They maintain their own police force, health services, education department, housing authority, and court system. The tribal chairman since 1978 was Earl J. Barbry, Sr. The current Chairman of the Tribal Council is Marshall Pierite.

=== Tunica Treasure ===
In the 1960s a treasure hunter named Leonard Charrier began searching for artifacts at the Trudeau Landing site in West Feliciana Parish, Louisiana. The Tunica, who felt he had stolen tribal heirlooms and desecrated the graves of their ancestors, were outraged. In the 1970s the site was excavated by archaeologists, who uncovered pottery, European trade goods and other artifacts deposited as grave goods by the Tunica from 1731 to 1764, when they occupied the site.

With help from the State of Louisiana, the tribe filed a lawsuit for the title to the artifacts, which has become known as the "Tunica Treasure". It took a decade to be worked through the courts, but the ruling became a landmark in American Indian history. It helped to lay the groundwork for new federal legislation, the Native American Graves Protection and Repatriation Act, passed in 1990. Because the artifacts had already been separated from the original burials, the tribe decided to build a museum to house them. Members of the tribe were trained as conservators to repair damage by the centuries underground, and storage and handling during the ten-year court battle.

From 1989 to 1991 the Tunica had the museum designed in the shape of the ancient platform mounds of their people to house the Treasure. The earthen structure took the symbolic place of the original burial underground. That building was later closed and the collection was moved to a new building that houses a museum exhibit hall, conservation and restoration laboratory, facilities for the tribal community, and tribal government offices.

=== Federal recognition ===
The tribe began formal efforts to be recognized by the federal government in the 1940s under Chief Eli Barbry, who led a group to Washington, D.C. Federal recognition would have entitled the tribe to benefit from social programs under the Indian Reorganization Act of 1934. A succession of chiefs, including Chief Horace Pierite Sr, worked at the task. The Tunica Treasure was considered part of the proof of the historical continuity of the tribe. They were recognized by the United States government in 1981 as the Tunica-Biloxi Indian Tribe. The formally recognized name of the tribe is the Tunica-Biloxi Tribe of Louisiana.

== Tunica language ==
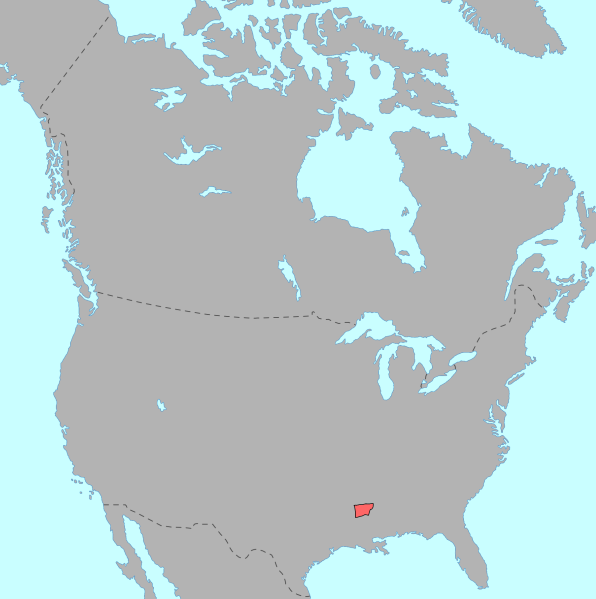
Tunica language

The Tunica (or Tonica, or less common form Yuron) language is a language isolate. The last known native speaker of Tunica, Sesostrie Youchigant, died in 1948. Linguist Mary Haas worked with Youchigant in the 1930s to describe what he remembered of the language, and the description was published in A Grammar of the Tunica Language in 1941, followed by Tunica Texts in 1950 and Tunica Dictionary in 1953. The Tunica tribe lived close to the Ofo and Avoyeles tribes, but communication between the three was only possible through the use of the Mobilian Jargon or French. Most modern Tunica speak English, with a few older members speaking French as a first language. Tunica is taught in weekly language classes, immersion programs, and a youth summer camp.

== See also ==
- List of sites and peoples visited by the Hernando de Soto Expedition
- Biloxi people
- Biloxi language
