= Retreat, Louisiana =

Unincorporated community in Louisiana, U.S.

Coordinates: 30°58′20″N 91°29′06″W

Retreat is an unincorporated community in West Feliciana Parish, Louisiana, United States.

== History ==
A post office called Retreat was established in 1940, and remained in operation until 1966. The community was so named on account of its idyllic setting. Variant names were "Retreat Plantation" and "Soldiers Retreat".
