= Antoine Davion =

Antoine Davion was originally from Saint-Omer in Artois, France. He served in various churches on the Île d'Orléans in Québec before departing for the Mississippi River in 1698 to help establish missions among the indigenous peoples. He would serve among the Tunica Indians from 1699 until about 1722 when he would retire to New Orleans. He would return to France and die among his family in 1726.
