= Bloodhound Site =

- U.S. National Register of Historic Places
- Location: West Feliciana Parish, Louisiana
- Area: 2.5 acres (1.0 ha)
- Built: 1729
- Architectural style: Native American village and burial site
- NRHP reference No.: 83000555
- Added to NRHP: May 2, 1983

The Bloodhound Site (16-WF-21) is an archaeological site in West Feliciana Parish, Louisiana, United States. It was once occupied by the Tunica tribe from 1700 to 1749.

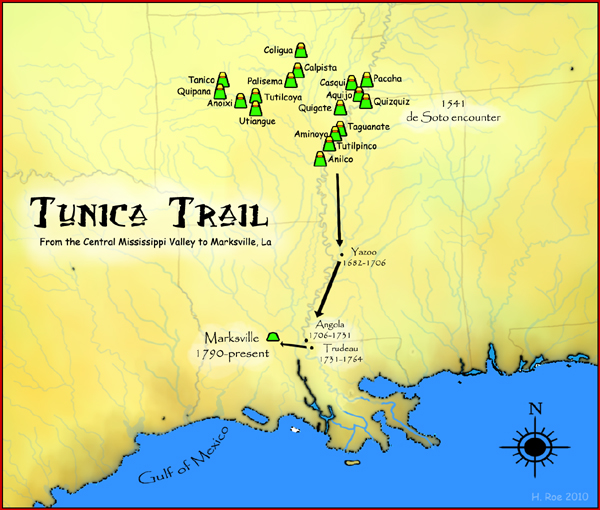
Tunica Trail map

== See also ==
- Trudeau Landing
- National Register of Historic Places listings in West Feliciana Parish, Louisiana
