= Weyanoke, Louisiana =

- Unincorporated community
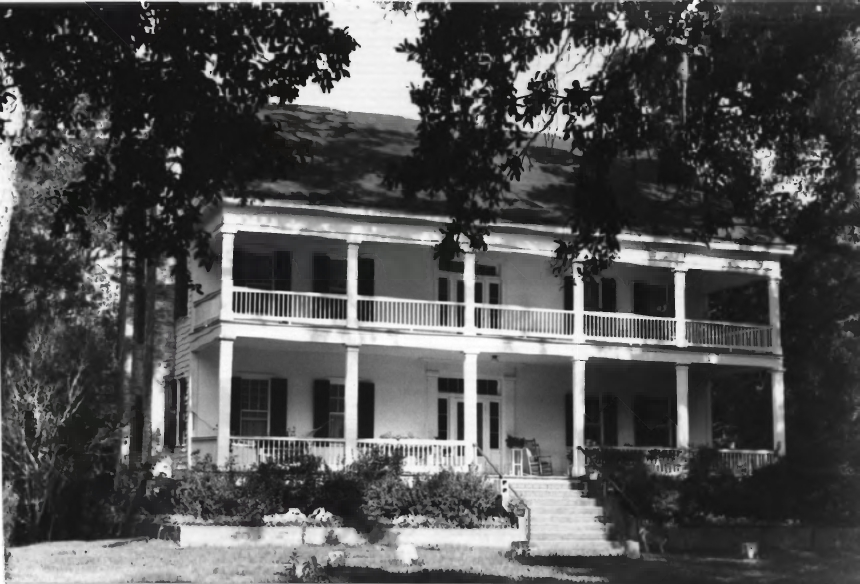
- Weyanoke historic house.

- Location within Louisiana Location within the United States
- Coordinates: 30°56′49″N 91°27′40″W
- Country: United States
- State: Louisiana
- Parish: West Feliciana
- Elevation: 151 ft (46 m)
- Time zone: UTC-6 (Central (CST))
  - Summer (DST): UTC-5 (CDT)
- ZIP code: 70787
- Area code: 225
- GNIS feature ID: 541214

Weyanoke is an unincorporated community in West Feliciana Parish, Louisiana, United States. Weyanoke is located on Louisiana Highway 66, 12.2 miles (19.6 km) north-northwest of St. Francisville. Weyanoke has a post office with ZIP code 70787. Some sites that are listed on the National Register of Historic Places within Weyanoke are St. Mary's Episcopal Church, Rosebank Plantation House and the Weyanoke house.
