= Tunica, Louisiana =

Unincorporated community in Louisiana, US

- Unincorporated community
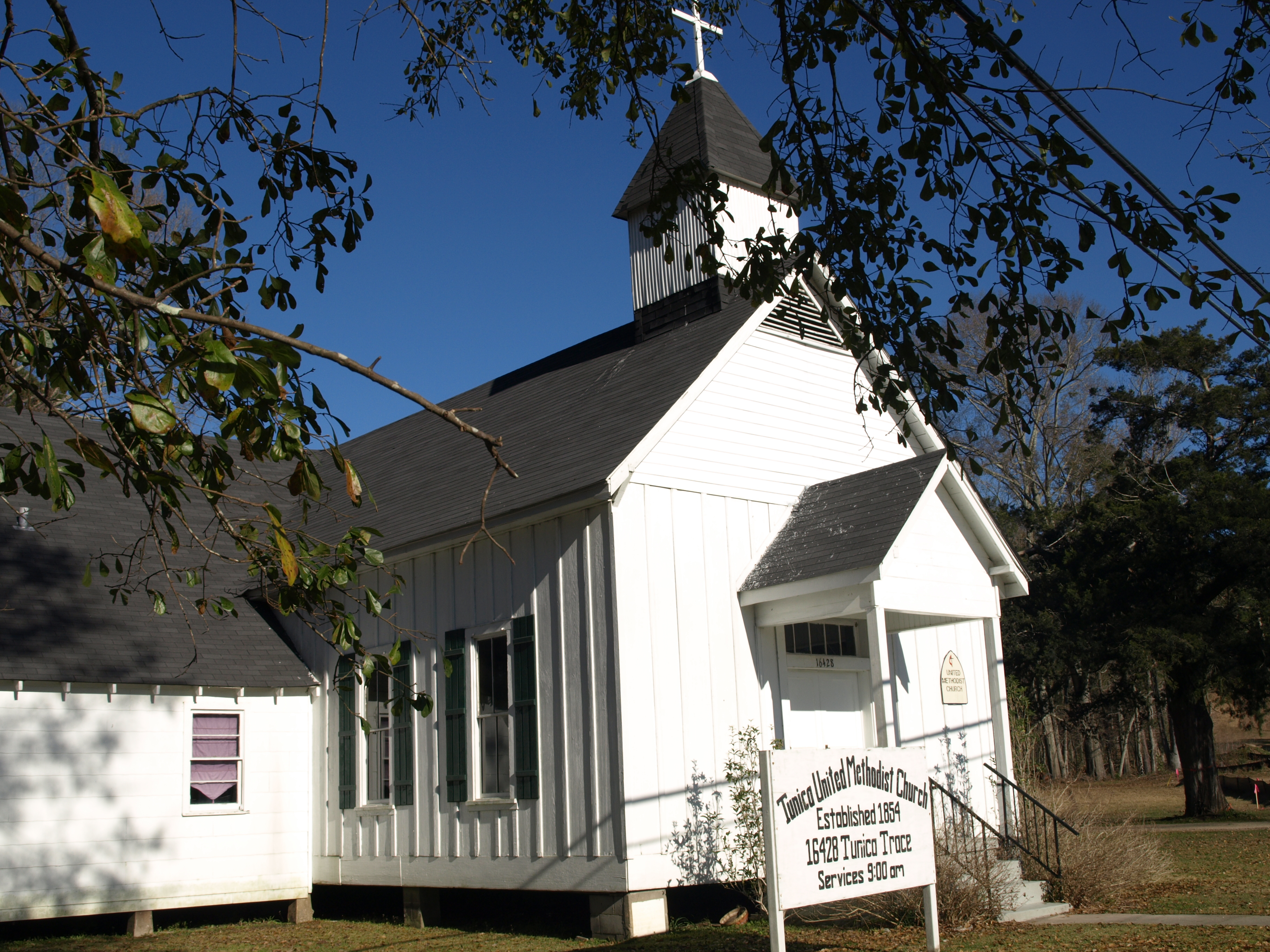
- Tunica United Methodist Church

- Location within the state of Louisiana
- Coordinates: 30°55′46″N 91°33′18″W
- Country: United States
- State: Louisiana
- Parish: West Feliciana
- Elevation: 66 ft (20 m)
- Time zone: UTC-6 (Central (CST))
  - Summer (DST): UTC-5 (CDT)
- ZIP code: 70782
- GNIS feature ID: 556277

Tunica is an unincorporated community in West Feliciana Parish, Louisiana, United States. Its elevation is 66 feet (20 m).

The United States Postal Service operates the Tunica Post Office along Louisiana Highway 66.

Two sites in Tunica are on the National Register of Historic Places: the Trudeau House and Trudeau Landing.

== Education ==
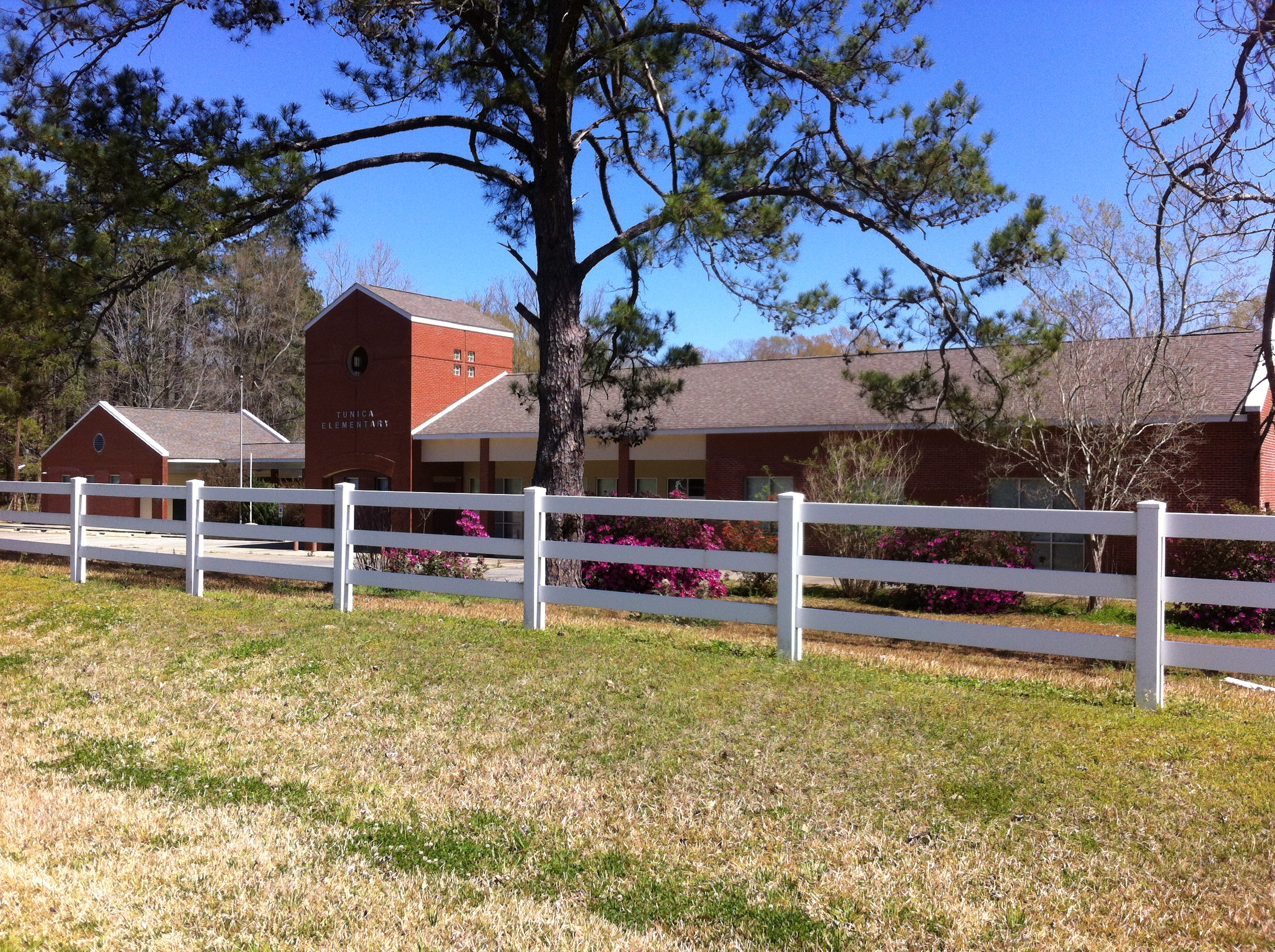
Tunica Elementary School

Residents are zoned to West Feliciana Parish Public Schools. Primary schools serving Tunica are Bains Lower Elementary School and Bains Elementary School in Bains. Secondary schools serving Tunica are West Feliciana Middle School and West Feliciana High School in Bains. The West Feliciana Parish Library is located in St. Francisville. The library, previously a part of the Audubon Regional Library System, became independent in January 2004. West Feliciana Parish is in the service area of Baton Rouge Community College.

Elementary school children previously attended Tunica Elementary School. The Tunica Elementary building, on Louisiana Highway 66, is 20 miles (32 km) from St. Francisville. The original school administration office and wings opened in 1953, with a third wing and multi-purpose building added at a later point. The school is several miles from the main entrance of Louisiana State Penitentiary (LSP), and some of its students lived on the LSP grounds and surrounding area within the Tunica Hills area. On May 18, 2011, due to budget cuts, the parish school board voted to close Tunica Elementary.

== Notable people ==
- Jesse Gray (1923–1988), community organizer and politician

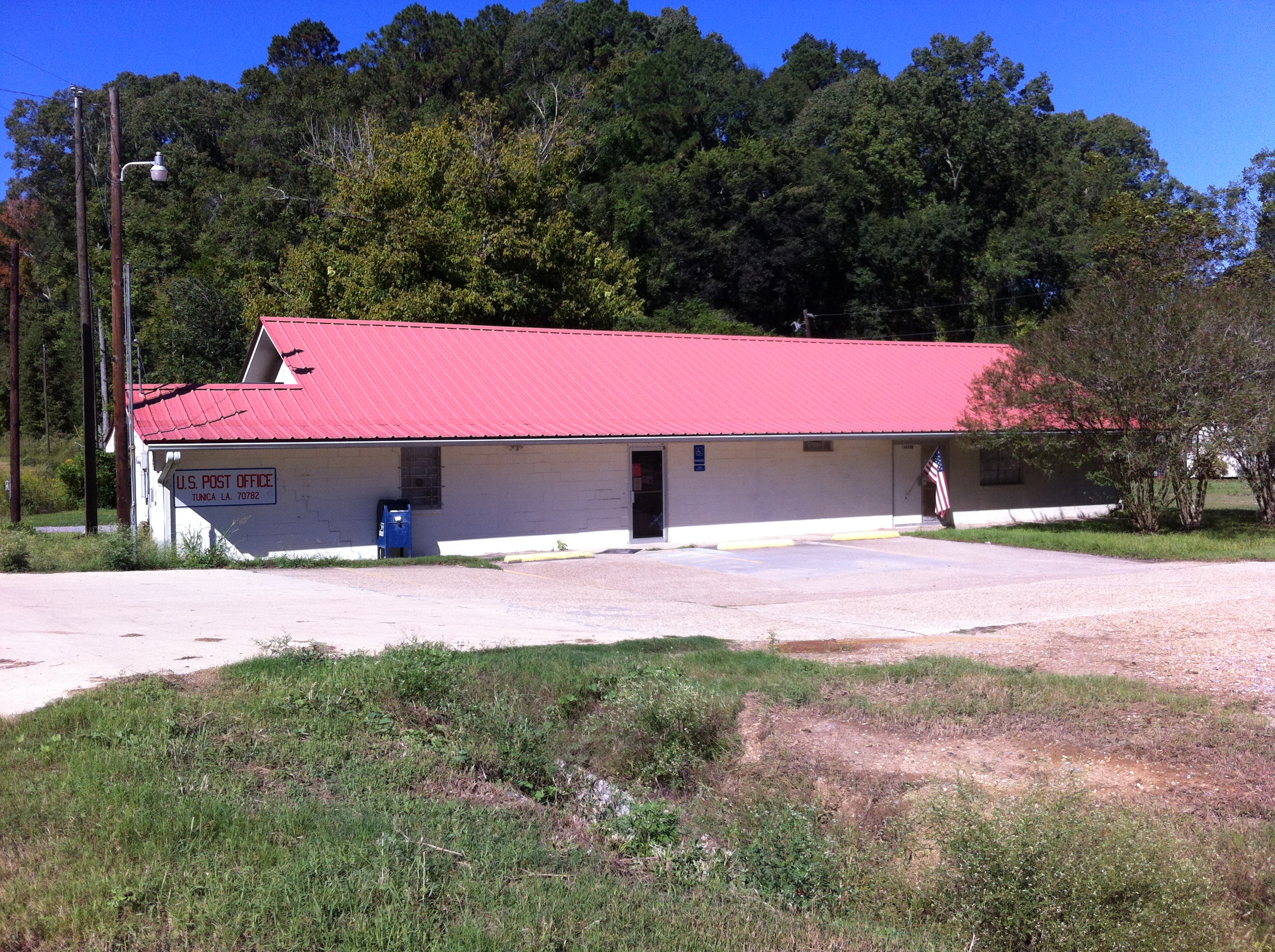
Tunica Post Office
