= Atakapa =

Former Native American tribe from Gulf of Mexico

Ishak
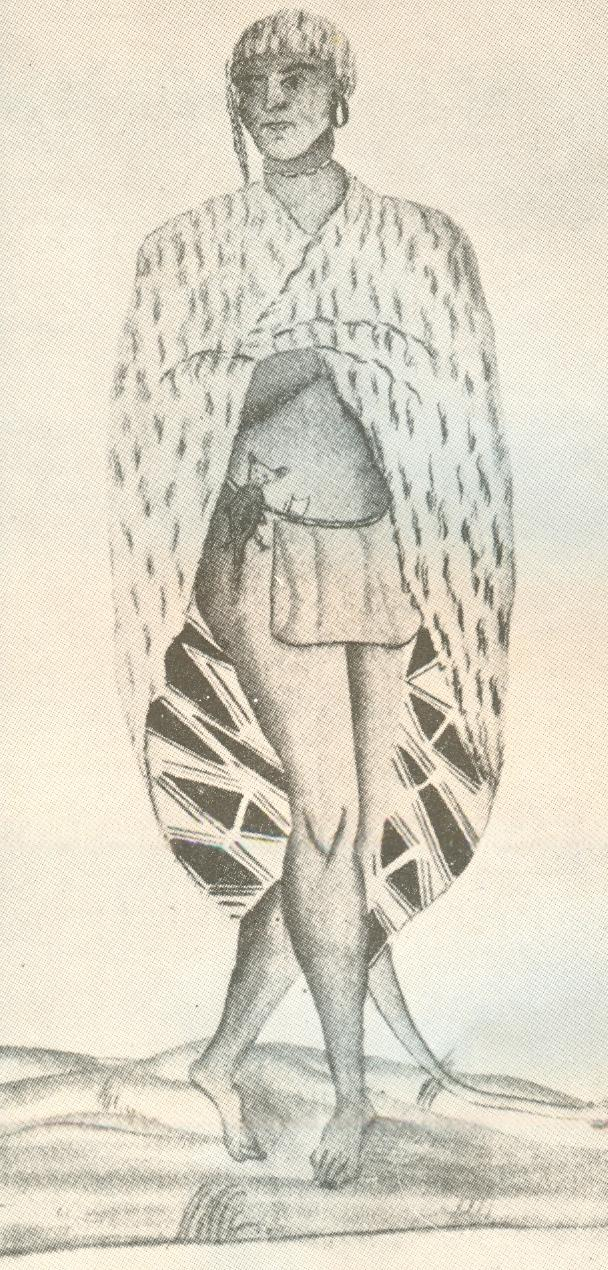
- An Attakapas, by Alexandre de Batz, 1735

Regions with significant populations
- United States (Louisiana, Texas)

Languages
- English, French, Spanish, Atakapa

Religion
- Christianity, Indigenous religion

Related ethnic groups
- Intermarried with Caddo, Koasati, and Houma

The Atakapa /əˈtækəpə, -pɑː/ or Atacapa were an Indigenous people of the Southeastern Woodlands, who spoke the Atakapa language and historically lived along the Gulf of Mexico in what is now Texas and Louisiana.

They included several distinct bands. They spoke the Atakapa language, which is a linguistic isolate.

In 1850, Chief Ló, the last recognized central leader of the Atakapa people, died. After his death, the Atakapa did not appoint a successor chief, leading to decentralization of tribal political governance. Survivors generally joined the Caddo, Koasati, and other neighboring peoples, although they kept some traditions. Some culturally distinct Atakapa descendants survived into the early 20th century, and assisted in the creation of an Atakapa language dictionary.

== Name ==
The Atakapa called themselves the Ishak, which translates as "the people." They were also called the Atacapaze, Atalapa, Attakapa, Attakapas, or Attacapa.

Atakapa is either a Choctaw or Mobilian term meaning "eater of human flesh". The Choctaw used this term due to their practice of ritual cannibalism. Europeans encountered the Choctaw first during their exploration, and adopted their name for this people to the west.

== Atakapa language ==
The Atakapa language (natively, Ishākkoy or Yukhíti Kóy) is a language isolate, once spoken along the Louisiana and East Texas coast, extinct since the mid-20th century. John R. Swanton in 1919 proposed a Tunican language family that would include Atakapa, Tunica, and Chitimacha. Mary Haas later expanded this into the Gulf language family with the addition of the Muskogean languages. As of 2001, linguists generally do not consider these proposed families as proven. Instead, linguist David V. Kaufman posits that the structural and lexical similarities across other regional languages such as Chitimacha and Tunica reflect an ancient Lower Mississippi Valley (LMV) sprachbund shaped by extensive trade and inter tribal contact.

== History ==
Atakapa believed they originated from the sea, and that an ancestral prophet laid out the rules of conduct.

=== 16th century ===
Atakapa in the 1500s.

The first documented European contact with the Atakapa occurred in November 1528, when survivors of the Spanish Pánfilo de Narváez were cast ashore on the upper Texas coast. Surviving crew landed on Isla de Malhado ("Isle of Misfortune"), today identified as Follet's Island. Among the survivors, Álvar Núñez Cabeza de Vaca, recorded that the island was inhabited by two groups: the Coco (Capoques) and the Han. The Han identified today as the Akokisa band of the Western Atakapa, noting that Han is derived from the Atakapa word aņ, meaning "house." Cabeza de Vaca's later account, La Relación provides the earliest ethnohistorical documentation of Atakapan lifestyles.

Following Hernando de Soto's expedition and Luis de Moscoso's 1542 exploration into inland Caddo territory to the north, European contact with coastal Atakapa bands remained low for over a century. Radiocarbon dating and excavations at coastal sites such as Mitchell Ridge on Galveston Island show Atakapa habitation of the area in economic and mortuary activity across the late prehistoric and 16th century protohistoric periods.

=== 17th century ===
In the 17th century, Atakapan populations inhabited six primary river drainage basins extending from the San Jacinto and Trinity rivers in southeast Texas to the Calcasieu, Mermentau, and Vermilion rivers in southwest Louisiana. These bands included the Akokisa, Bidai, Atakapa proper, Calcasieu, Opelousa, and Vermilion bands who shared dialects of the Atakapan language. These communities maintained regional trade networks across the Lower Mississippi Valley and Gulf Coast, exchanging dried and smoked fish, shark teeth, hides, and salt (produced near formations such as the Avery Island salt dome) with the neighboring Chitimacha, Caddo, and Karankawa for pottery, flint from the Avoyelles, and early European trade goods such as iron knives, axes, kettles, early trade muskets, glass trade beads, fine cloth, red ribbons, vermillion, tobacco, and small brass bells.

Direct European exploration continued in the 1680s following French efforts to claim the Gulf coast. In 1685, René-Robert Cavelier ,Sieur de La Salle established a short lived French settlement near Matagorda Bay. Between 1686 and 1687, la Salle and his lieutenant Henri Joutel traveled near upper Atakapa and Akokisa territories along the trinity and San Jacinto river basins. The Spanish in response dispatched search expeditions. In April 1687, Captains Martín de Rivas and Pedro de Iriarte explored Galveston Bay accompanied by Enríque Barroto. During this voyage along the Calcasieu River while searching for the French, the Spanish came across a 9 year old castaway Mexican boy, Nicolás de Vargas who had been adopted by a local Atakapan family. Barroto's log providing an early description of Atakapan deerskin garments, circular hair cutting and facial and body tattoos:

Coming on board, he wept with joy at seeing himself among Spaniards. His face has tatoos like these Indians, with a black line that goes down the front to the end of his nose, another from the lower lip to the end of the chin, another small one next to each eye and, on each cheek, a small black spot. Like the nose, the lips are also blackened, and the arms are painted with other markings. His clothing consisted of the deerskin that girded the waist, and the hair has a circular cut like a religious lay brother’s, with one line going down the neck to encircle the breasts like the other Indians of this nation.

— Enríque Barroto

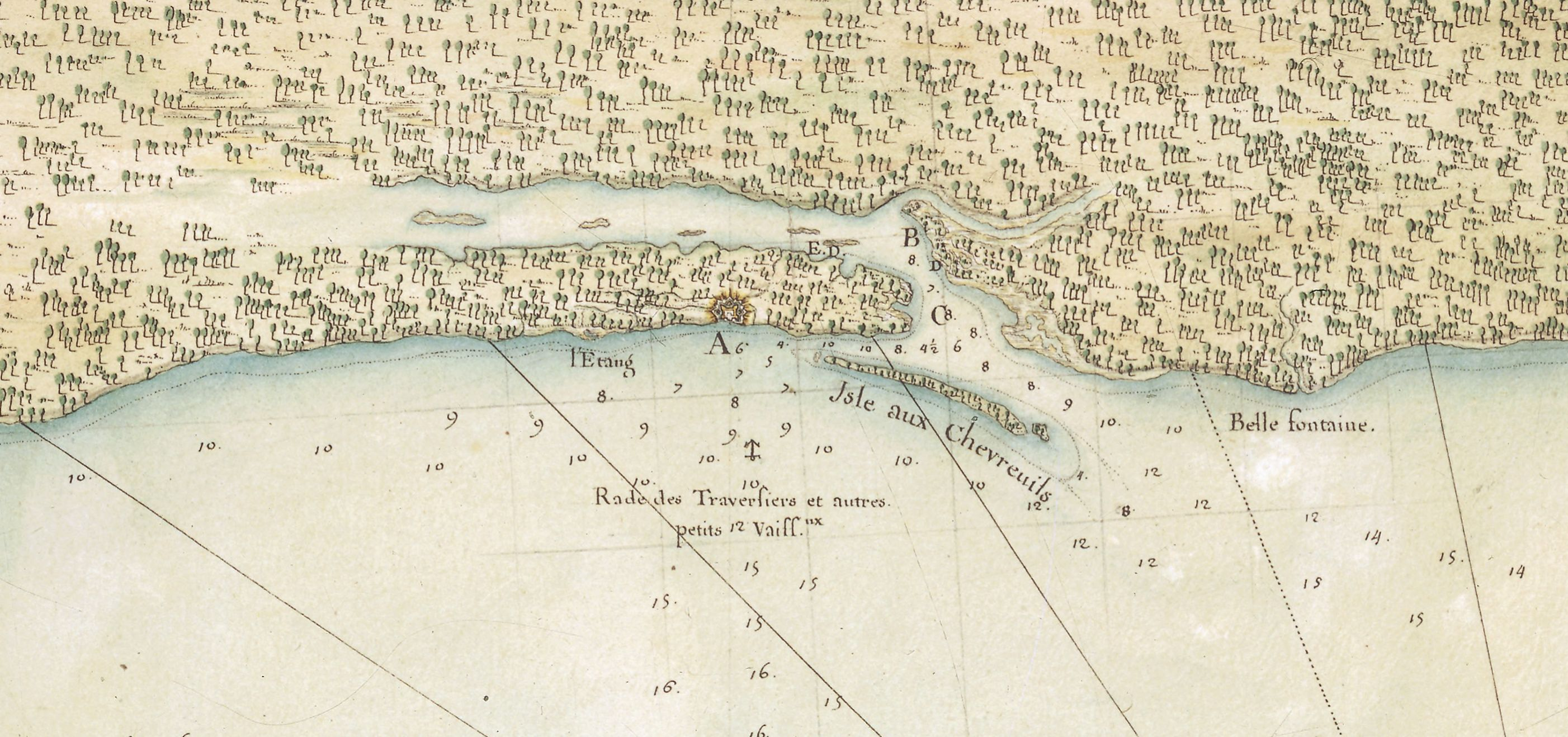
Vieux Biloxi (Fort Maurepas) on the Biloxi Coast (site B on the map)

Spanish land expeditions under Alonso de León crossed northern Atakapan trade trails in 1689 and 1690. By 1699, the French had founded Fort Maurepas, serving as the temporary capital of Louisiana (New France) near Biloxi, establishing a permanent European colonial presence along the Gulf Coast, creating frequent trade and diplomatic relations between French traders and Atakapan bands entering the 18th century.

=== 18th century ===
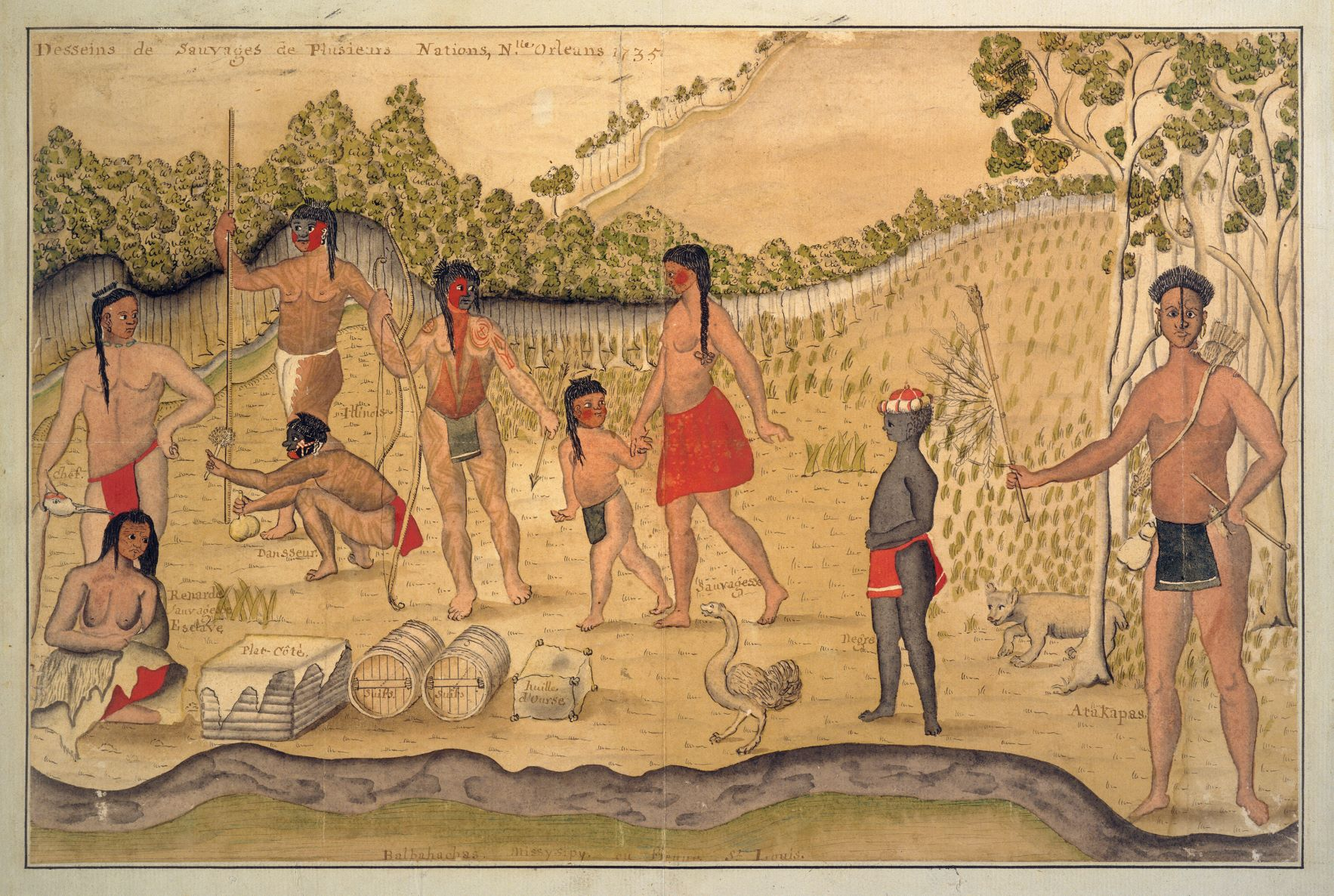
A watercolor sketch of 8 Indigenous people of various tribes and 1 boy of African descent in 1735. The man on the far right, with the calumet, is Atakapa.

In 1703, Jean-Baptiste Le Moyne, the French governor of La Louisiane, sent three men to explore the Gulf Coast west of the Mississippi River. The seventh nation they encountered were the Atakapa, who captured, killed and cannibalized one member of their party. In 1714 this tribe was one of 14 that were recorded as coming to Jean-Michel de Lepinay, who was acting French governor of Louisiana between 1717 and 1718, while he was fortifying Dauphin Island, Alabama. Atakapa, predominantly women and children, were among the indigenous tribes trafficked by Frenchmen at Fort St. Jean-Baptiste de Natchitoches, built in 1714.

The Choctaw told the French settlers about the "People of the West," who represented subdivisions or tribes. The French referred to them as les sauvages. The Choctaw used the name Atakapa, meaning "people eater" (hattak 'person', apa 'to eat'), for them. It referred to their practice of ritual cannibalism related to warfare.

In 1719, French explorer Francois Simars de Bellisle and four companions were marooned near Galveston Bay when their ship overshot Louisiana. After his companions died of starvation, Belleisle was taken captive before being stripped of his clothing by an Akokisa (Western Atakapa) band while they were gathering bird eggs. He lived among them for 18 months as a captive before being given to an elderly widow within the band. In February 1721, he was rescued after sending a letter delivered by Hasinai Caddo traders to French commander Louis Juchereau de Saint-Denis at Natchitoches.

During an early winter bison hunt on the Katy Prairie, Bellisle observed the Akokisa ambush a group of enemy Toyal hunters, dismembering and consuming a fallen warrior. Modern ethnohistorians understand these accounts as a form of exocannibalism as a ritual war custom done only on slain enemy warriors to absorb their valor or to symbolically punish their enemies, rather than a practice done out of hunger or on fellow kin. When Spaniards resorted to cannibalism out of starvation in 1528, Atakapan hosts were appalled.

In 1731, French commandant Louis Juchereau de Saint Denis sought emergency support from the Atakapa, Natchitoches, Caddo, and nearby Spanish soldiers during a Natchez attack on Natchitoches Post with the combined forces defeating the Natchez. Natchez survivors were captured by the Natchitoches, Caddos, and Ishak or enslaved by the French. In the early 18th century, some Atakapa married into the Houma tribe of Louisiana.

The French historian Antoine-Simon Le Page du Pratz lived in Louisiana from 1718 to 1734. He wrote a perspective of this practice among the Atakapa and apparent subsequent ending of it:

Along the west coast, not far from the sea, inhabit the nation called Atacapas, that is, Man-Eaters, being so called by the other nations on account of their detestable custom of eating their enemies, or such as they believe to be their enemies. In the vast country there are no other cannibals to be met with besides the Atacapas; and since the French have gone among them, they have raised in them so great a horror of that abominable practice of devouring creatures of their own species, that they have promised to leave it off: and, accordingly, for a long time past we have heard of no such barbarity among them.

— Antoine-Simon Le Page du Pratz

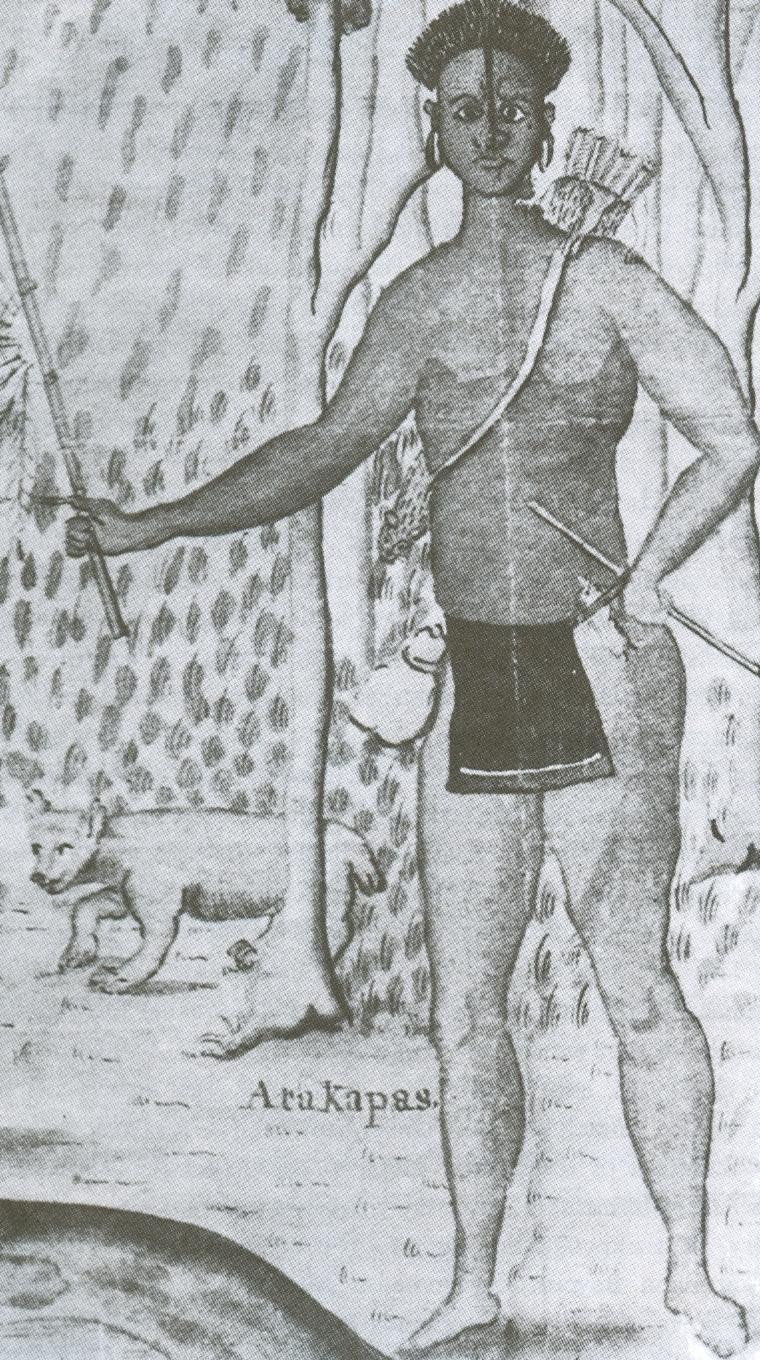
Detail from a drawing by Alexandre de Batz, 1735

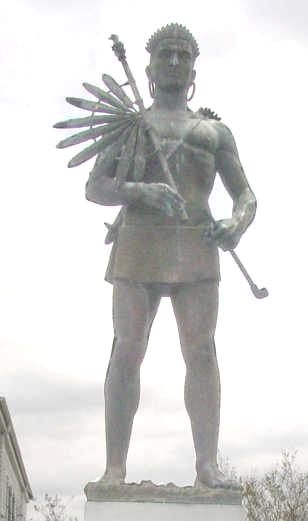
Atakapa statue in St. Martinville, Louisiana.

In 1760, the French Gabriel Fuselier de la Claire came into the Attakapas Territory, and bought all the land between Vermilion River and Bayou Teche from the Eastern Atakapa Chief Kinemo. Shortly after that a rival Indian tribe, the Opelousa, coming from the area between the Atchafalaya and Sabine rivers, exterminated the Eastern Atakapa. They had occupied the area between Atchafalaya River and Bayou Nezpique (Attakapas Territory).

In the spring of 1771, Quitachoulabenak, a female leader, led an Atakapa community of about 500 near modern day Lafayette, Louisiana and received Jean Bernard Bossu during his diplomatic mission to the Atakapa nation on behalf of Spanish authorities. Bossu wrote of his stay and wrote that she was adored by her people, describing that people nicknamed her "woman of valor" and continued to compare her to Queen Elizabeth. The Atakapa traded with the Chitimacha tribe and were close allies in the early colonial era. They also entered Lafourche in the 1770s. Members of the Tunica-Biloxi tribe joined the Atakapa tribe in the late 18th century.

=== 19th century ===
By the 19th century, the Atakapa were spread across several river basin in southwest Louisiana and southeast Texas, including the Bayou Vermillion, the Mermentau River, the Calcasieu River, and Galveston Bay. In 1805, the Indian Agent John Sibley estimated the Louisiana Atakapa population at about 50 men, with another 30 or so Tunica and Houma men who had married into their settlements.

During this time, eastern Atakapa bands participated in the cattle economy, registering livestock brands at the Poste des Attakapas (Saint Martinville) and in St. Landry Parish under leaders such as Chief Bernard and Celestine le Tortue.

==== American settlement begins ====
After the 1803 Louisiana Purchase, American territorial policies accelerated the transfer of Atakapa lands to Euro-American settlers. In land claims recorded in the American State Papers, large communal tracts of land along the Mermentau, Vermilion, and Queue de Tortue rivers were acquired by planters often through unratified deeds or disputed purchases from tribal leaders, exacerbated at times by evident low understanding of English. At the same time, indigenous enslavement and legal reclassification persisted on regional plantations, as highlighted in the 1817 Louisiana Supreme Court case, Séville v. Chrétien.

==== Death of Chief Ló and decentralization ====
By the mid 19th century, repeated outbreaks of diseases such as smallpox, cholera, dysentery, and typhoid fever severely decimated the Atakapa. Around 1850, Chief Ló, the last recognized central leader of the Atakapa (Yukhíti) people died. After his death, the Atakapa did not appoint a successor chief, leading to decentralization of tribal political governance.

In the 1870 U.S. Census for "Imperial Calcasieu" Parish, nine Atakapa and one Biloxi were recorded living along Prien Lake, in an Atakapa village known as Túl Núng. A further four individuals living outside the Indigenous settlements, who were listed as "Indian," were later identified as Atakapa.

==== Language documentation ====
In January 1885, ethnologist Albert S. Gatschet visited Lake Charles to document the Atakapa language, doing fieldwork with the native speakers Kishyúts (Louison Huntington) and Tóttoksh (Delilah Moss). Among the fieldnotes captured were also genealogical narratives describing Chief Ló and Chief Shukuhúy's lineage. Moss composed 13 pages of an initial manuscript by Gatschet, and assisted him in copyediting.

=== 20th century ===
Courtney Morris writes that in the early 20th century, Atakapa families were associated with the lakes along the Calcasieu River, that form the boundary between Carlyss and Hackberry. As the petrochemical industry rapidly expanded across southwest Louisiana and southeast Texas in the 1920s and 1930s, families migrated along industrial corridors to refining centers such as Port Arthur and Beaumont, Texas or the freedmen's town of Mossville, Louisiana.

In The Great Power of Small Nations: Indigenous Diplomacy in the Gulf South, historian Elizabeth N. Ellis uses Petites Nations for the smaller indigenous polities that French colonists called les petites nations. Ellis includes the Ishak in this category, explaining her use of the term, writing that "the people the French historically called Atakapa prefer to be identified as Ishak. She argues that many Petites Nations maintained their autonomy by remaining small and avoiding incorporation into larger nations, challenging portrayals of small indigenous polities as declining remnants.

==== Atakapa speakers ====
Onezime (Armojean) Reon, who was related to four of the other Atakapa speakers.

In 1907 through 1908, ethnologist, John R. Swanton visited Calcasieu Parish, identifying 9 known surviving fluent speakers living in the area.

Five were the brothers Onezime (Armojean) and Eugene Reon, their mother's sisters Delphine Williams and Ellen Esclovon, and their cousin Mary Cameron Jones. There were also the siblings Rosemond (Teet) and Eliza Verdine, as well as the unrelated Felix Wartell Jr. and Delilah Moss/Morse. Wartell's mother Victorine had previously owned land in Oklahoma.

In 1932, the Smithsonian published A Dictionary of the Atakapa Language, which collected together Gatschet's 1885 fieldnotes and Swanton's later recordings into the grammatical guide. In the dictionary, Gatschet wrote that a vowel he pronounced as 'ä' was pronounced by Reon as an 'ă', like in the English language.

=== 21st century ===
Modern multidisciplinary scholarship emphasizes that the Atakapa people did not vanish, rather persisted through documented familial lineages and cultural adaptations. Gregory Button and Kristina Peterson identify surviving Atakapa descendants in Louisiana and Texas and challenge accounts of Atakapa disappearance as an example of "the myth of the vanishing Indian."

==== Documented families ====
Carlyss, Louisiana, location of the Verdine Cemetery, where Rosemond (Teet) and Eliza Verdine were both buried.

Regarding the ten previously mentioned Atakapa language speakers, researchers Ted A. Campbell and Geoffrey Kimball write that while census enumerators reclassified Native peoples as "mulatto," "black," or "white" based on rigid phenotype instructions, Native identity was actively preserved within families. They say this was demonstrated by death certificates for language speakers Rosemond (Teet) Verdine and Felix Wartell Jr, where family members explicitly recorded their race as "Indian."

Descendants of the Atakapa from the Verdine and Doiron (Note: Teet Verdine married an Emily/Emedie Doiron. Campbell and Kimball write the Doiron family was associated with the Atakapa, and that the Atakapa Verdine family associated with them in Hackberry, Louisiana.) families are buried at the Verdine Cemetery in Carlyss, and Doiron Cemetery east of Hackberry. Kimball and Campbell say it is likely members of the Reon family, ancestral to speaker Armojean Reon, are buried in the Grand Lake Cemetery on Calcasieu Lake. Jo Beth Duncan, granddaughter of Arthemise Verdine of the Verdine family, assisted researchers in locating cemetery locations in 2025.

== Culture ==
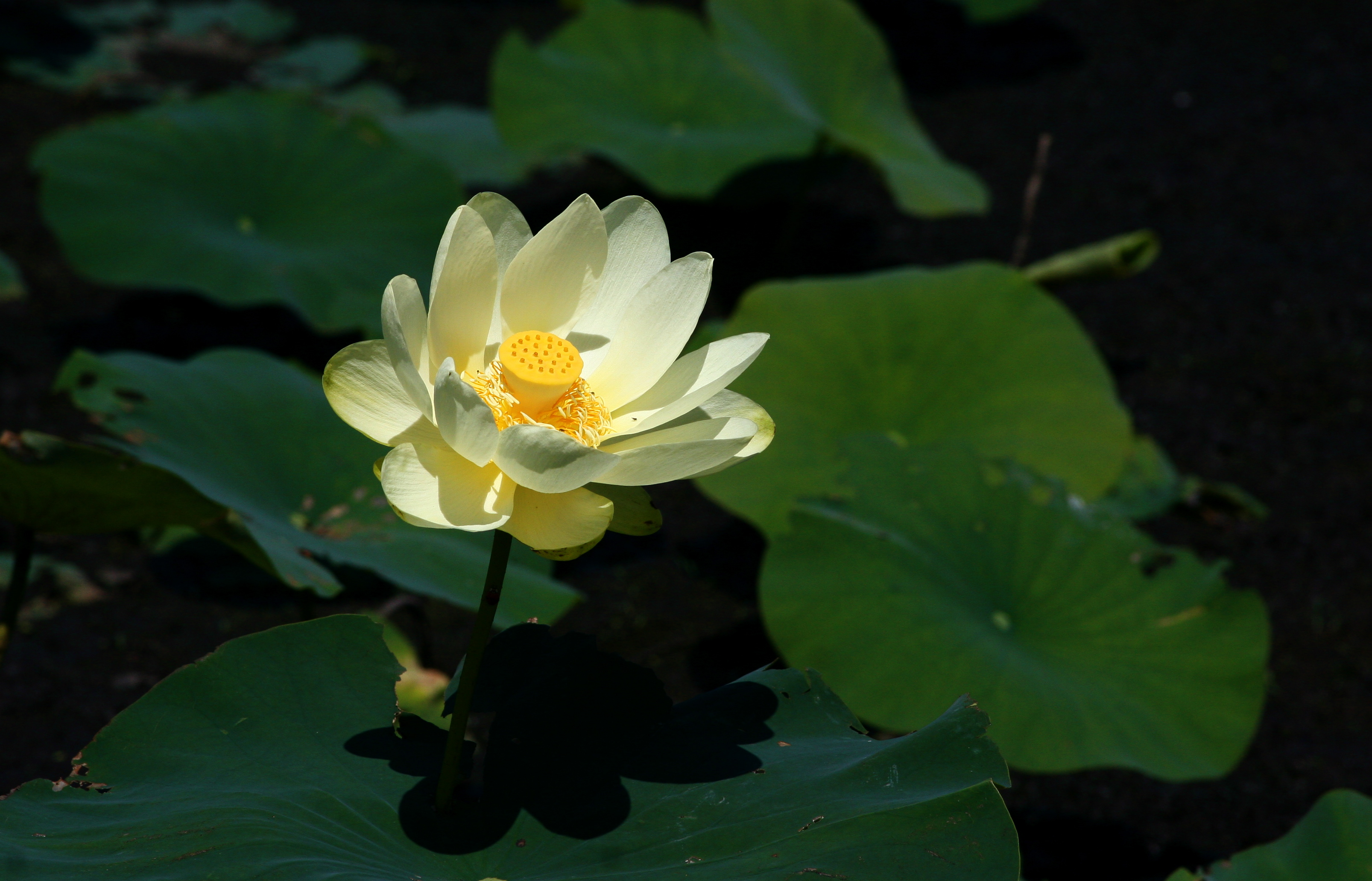
The Atakapan ate the rhizomes and seeds of the American lotus

=== Cuisine ===
The Atakapa ate a diet centralized around what was available to them on their traditional costal, river, and inland prairie environments. Food preparation and gathering was divided by gender.

Men were responsible for hunting large game, including white tailed deer, black bear,and bison. Bison being hunted on horseback by the early 18th century. Men also fished and engaged in aquatic hunting using bone or flint tipped harpoons, spears, and short darts, spearing flounder by torchlight, and taking alligators by spearing them in the eye or dragging them ashore. Male medicine men created plant-based fish poisons to sprinkle over lagoons to stun fish. Men also created ceramic vessels and lit fires.

Women were responsible for gathering wild foods including marsh potatoes, blackberries, strawberries, wild grapes, persimmons, prickly pear cactus fruit, pecans, walnuts, chinquapins, hickory nuts, acorns and the rhizomes and seeds of the American lotus (kathopsh) which served as a starchy food staple in the winter as it was stored easily. Bread was made from tubers. The seeds of the lotus were eaten raw or roasted to make a flour for porridge. Women also grew small plots of maize, beans, pumpkins, and trees of peaches, figs, plums, and apples. They collected firewood, and cooked meals.

Flounder was baked whole in earth pits. It was traded amongst bands, including to the Opelousas who considered flounder a fine delicacy. Smaller fish was impaled on reeds and smoked over fires. Meat and water were boiled in hide-lined earth pits, using heated stones or fired clay balls. Alligators were baked in pits of red hot oyster shells to render alligator oil. The oil was stored in earthen jugs for cooking, lamp fuel, skin protection against mosquitoes and sunburn, and perceived swimming buoyancy when applied to the skin.

Like other southeastern tribes, leaves of the yaupon holly were steeped into a ceremonial hot tea, known as black drink. Within the Akokisa band, it was drunk in large quantities to induce purging for spiritual purposes. However in some areas such as Lake Charles, it was considered a mild social beverage and not a ritual drink.

They used dugout canoes to navigate the bayous and close to shore, but did not venture far into the ocean.

In the summer, families moved to the coast. In winters, they moved inland and lived in villages of houses made of pole and thatch. The Bidai lived in bearskin tents. The homes of chiefs and medicine men were erected on earthwork mounds made by several previous cultures including the Mississippian.

== Subdivisions or bands ==
=== Eastern Atakapa ===
The Eastern Atakapa groups lived in present-day Acadiana parishes in southwestern Louisiana and are organized as three major regional bands:

- The Otse, Teche Band, lived on the prairies and coastal marshes in the Mermentau River watershed, along the Bayou Nezpique, Bayou des Cannes, and Bayou Plaquemine Brule, containing the freshwater Grand and White lakes, and around St. Martinville on Bayou Teche in present-day St. Martin, Lafayette, St. Landry, St. Mary, Acadia and Evangeline parishes in southern Louisiana.
- The Tsikip, Opelousa, Opelousas Band Before European contact in the 18th century, they lived between the Atchafalaya River and Sabine River (at the present-day border of Texas-Louisiana) to the west of the lower Mississippi River. Later they were centered in the area around present-day Opelousas, Louisiana and the prairies around St. Landry Parish. They were at times associated with the neighboring Eastern Atakapa and Chitimacha peoples. They were warlike and preyed on neighbors to defend their own territory. In 1760 Chief Kinemo of the Eastern Atakapa sold the tribal lands between the Vermilion River and Bayou Teche to Frenchman Gabriel Fuselier de la Claire; the angry Opelousa exterminated the Eastern Atakapa bands for selling off communal lands. The Opelousa band may have spoken an Eastern Atakapan dialect.

=== Western Atakapa ===
- The Akokisa or Orkokisak ("persimmon-gathering people"), the westernmost Atakapa (Ishāk) tribe inhabited the lower Trinity and San Jacinto river basins, Cypress Creek, and Galveston Bay in present day southeast Texas. They spoke the Orkokisak dialect of Ishākkoy. Akokisa villages persisted along Houston area waterways through the 19th century before merging with neighboring Bidai and Atakapa proper families.
- The Bidai were based around Bedias Creek, ranging from the Brazos River to Neches River, Texas.
- The Deadose, a band of Bidai that separated in the early 18th century, lived north of the other Bidai between the confluence of the Angelina River and Neches River and the upper end of Galveston Bay in east-central Texas. Around 1720 they moved westward between the Brazos and Trinity rivers; later they settled near missions on the San Gabriel River (with the Bidai and Akokisa) in the Texas Hill Country. Between 1749 and 1751 they gathered (with the Akokisa, Orcoquiza, Bidai, and Patiri) at the short-lived San Ildefonso Mission near the mouth of Brushy Creek; some settled near the Alamo Mission in San Antonio. In the second half of the 18th century, the Deadose were closely associated with Tonkawan groups (Ervipiame, Mayeye, and Yojuane). Suffering high mortality from epidemics of measles and smallpox, survivors joined kindred Bidai, Akokisa and Tonkawa. They lost their distinctive tribal identity in the latter part of the 18th century.
- The Patiri or Petaros lived north of the San Jacinto River valley between the Bidai to the north and the Akokisa in the south of Texas. This places them in the Piney Woods of East Texas, west of the Trinity River in the area between Houston and Huntsville. Little is known about them. Potentially they were a southern Bidai band.
- The Tlacopsel, Acopsel, or Lacopspel — it is believed that they lived in the same general area as the Bidai and Deadose. The location of their settlements in southeast Texas are unknown. They are known only from Spanish documents of the eighteenth century, when they were referred to for requesting missions from the Spanish in east central Texas.

== State-recognized tribes ==
Two state-recognized tribes in Louisiana claim descent from Atakapa people. They are not federally recognized as Native American tribes.

=== Point au Chien Indian Tribe ===
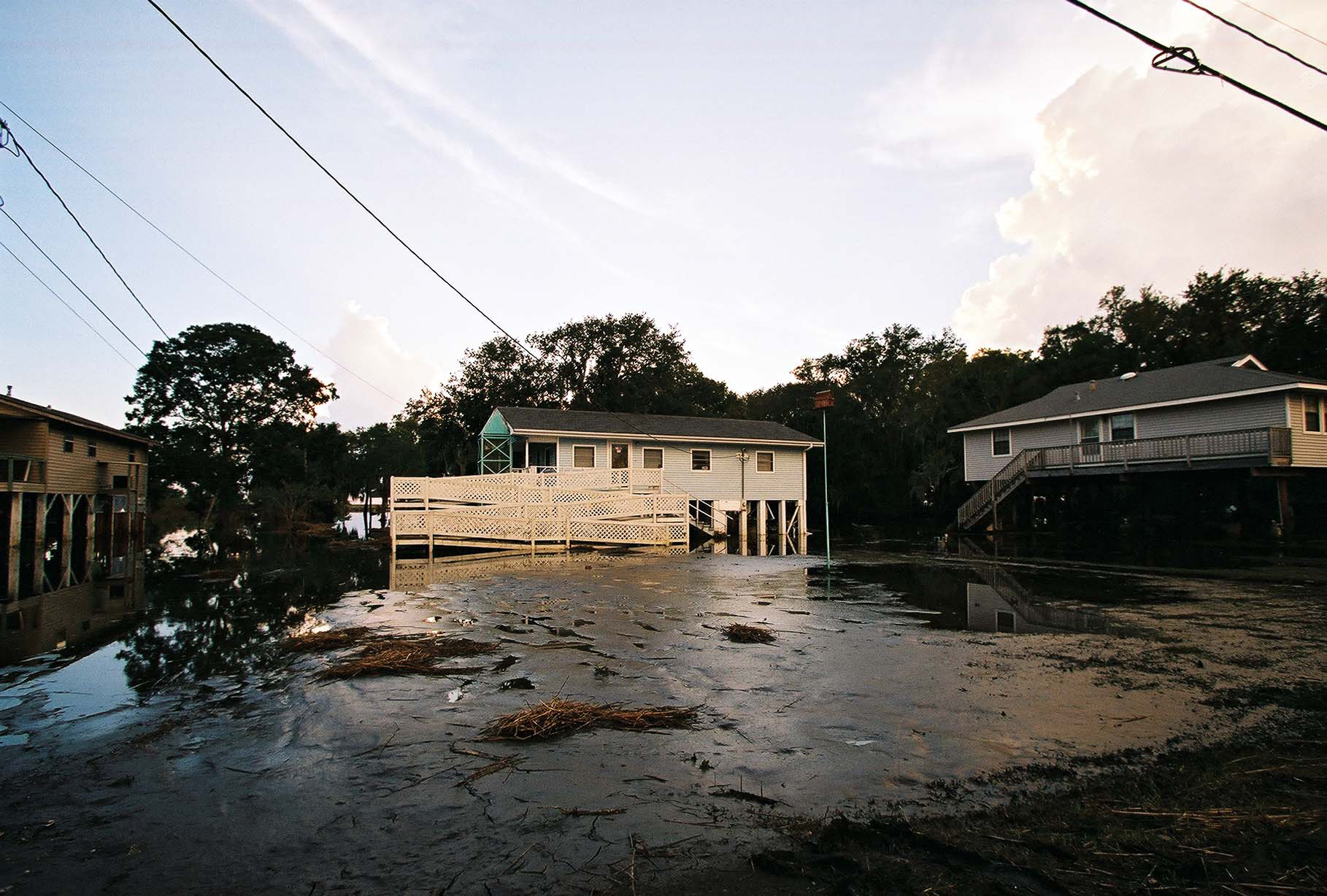
Point-Aux-Chenes, Louisiana in 2002.

Elizabeth Ellis mentions the Pointe-au-Chien Indian Tribe trace their origins partially to small groups of Atakapa. She argues that the Pointe-au-Chien are not federally recognized due to their nature as a Petite Nation, saying their history is portrayed via disappearance and decline.

=== Biloxi-Chitimacha Confederation of Muskogees ===
The Biloxi, Chitimacha Confederation of Muskogees, Inc. claims descent from the historical Atakapa, among other tribes. The U.S. Bureau of Indian Affairs states they could not provide evidence of this descent.

== Cultural heritage groups ==
Numerous unrecognized organizations identify as Atakapa descendants, and some have unsuccessfully petitioned Louisiana, Texas, and the United States for status as a recognized tribe. A member of the "Atakapa Indian de Creole Nation," claiming to be trustee, monarch, and deity, filed several lawsuits in federal court claiming, among other things, that the governments of Louisiana and the United States seek to "monopolize intergalactic foreign trade." The suits were dismissed as frivolous.

These organizations are not federally recognized or state-recognized as Native American tribes.

One such group is the [[[Atakapa Ishak Nation]] based in Louisiana. Self-identified descendants of the Atakapa had begun organizing petition efforts for federal tribal recognition in the 1990s. One of them, Hubert Daniel Singleton recalled an area of Lake Charles, that he called the "dummyline," saying Atakapa descendants resided there in the 1930s. Singleton said local dialects in Lake Charles retained ancestral Atakapa phrasing and cultural expressions throughout the mid-20th century.

Civic bodies, including the Atakapa Ishak Tribe of Southeast Texas and Southwest Louisiana, began to organize following a reunion of claimed descendants in 2006, to manage community affairs, seek both informal and formal recognition of the tribe.

The Atakapa Ishak Tribe of Southeast Texas and Southwest Louisiana, also called the Atakapa Ishak Nation, based in Lake Charles, Louisiana obtained nonprofit status in 2008 as an "ethnic awareness" organization. In 2007, the Atakapa-Ishak Nation of Southeast Texas and Southwest Louisiana sent a letter of intent to petition for federal recognition.

The Atakapas Ishak Nation presents a 1781 census of the Church of Attacapas (in current day-St. Martin's Parish) as a list of 'Indian names'. Scholar Renate Bartl writes that the names are mostly French and English. She says it is highly questionable the names are Atakapa, due to the census listing every single person living in the church parish. She writes that the claim of the group to Native American identity is highly questionable as a result.

=== Grand Bayou Village ===
In Plaquemine Parish, Grand Bayou Village houses the 'Atakapa-Ishak/Chawasha community' and is only accessible by boat. Button and Peterson describe the community as having occupied the site for at least three hundred years, and say they intermarried with the United Houma Nation. Residents of Grand Bayou have also participated in collaborative research incorporating oral histories and traditional ecological knowledge (TEK) into efforts to preserve cultural knowledge and ways of responding to tropical storms and hurricanes.

== Legacy ==
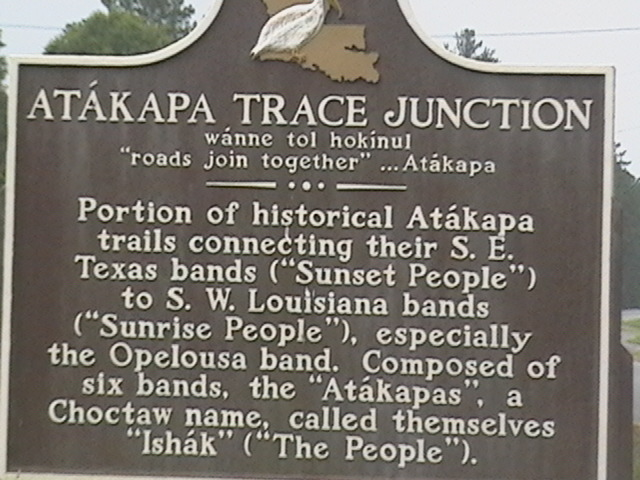
Plaque for Attakapa Trace Junction

The names of present-day towns in the region can be traced to the Ishak; they are derived both from their language and from French transliteration of the names of their prominent leaders and names of places. The town of Mermentau is a corrupted form of the local chief Nementou. "Plaquemine," as in Bayou Plaquemine Brûlée and Plaquemines Parish, is derived from the Atakapa word pikamin, meaning 'persimmon'. Bayou Nezpiqué was named for an Atakapan who had a tattooed nose. Bayou Queue de Tortue was believed to have been named for Chief Celestine La Tortue of the Atakapas nation. The name Calcasieu comes through French from an Atakapa name, Katkōsh Yōk ('Crying Eagle').

The city of Lafayette, Louisiana, is planning a series of trails, funded by the Federal Highway Administration, to be called the "Atakapa–Ishak Trail". It will consist of a bike trail connecting downtown areas along the bayous Vermilion and Teche, which are now accessible only by foot or boat.

== See also ==
- USS Atakapa (ATF-149)
- Attakapas Parish
