= Atakapa Ishak Nation =

Cultural organization in Louisiana

- Atakapa Ishak Tribe of Southeast Texas and Southwest Louisiana
- Named after: Atakapa people and their autonym, Ishak
- Formation: 2008
- Founder: Hugh Daniel Singleton
- Founded at: Prairie Laurent, Louisiana
- Type: nonprofit organization
- Tax ID no.: EIN 80-0156227
- Legal status: 501(c)(3) nonprofit
- Location: Lake Charles, Louisiana, United States
- Members: estimated 900 (2012)
- Principal chief: Edward Chretien Jr.
- Website: atakapa-ishak.org

The Atakapa Ishak Nation, officially named the Atakapa Ishak Tribe of Southeast Texas and Southwest Louisiana, is a cultural heritage organization based in Lake Charles, Louisiana of an estimated 900 individuals who identify as descendants of the Atakapa people. Members with positions in the organization say the tribe overlaps with the Louisiana Creoles, and that the historic Atakapa people are ancestral to modern Louisiana Creoles.

They developed through mass organizing, mostly under the leadership of claimed Atakapa descendant Hubert Singleton in 1996. They held a reunion in 2006, and in 2008, the Atakapa Ishak Tribe of Southeast Texas and Southwest Louisiana was formed, a 501(c)(3) nonprofit based in Lake Charles. It engages in efforts to obtain government recognition, language renewal, and historical and contemporary awareness.

The Atakapa Ishak Nation is an unrecognized organization. Despite using the word nation in its name, the group is neither a federally recognized tribe nor a state-recognized tribe. Disagreements within the tribe led it to split into three factions in 2012. Louisiana rejected the Atakapa Ishak Nation's application for state recognition.

== Historical timeline and scholarship ==
=== 18th century ===
The Atakapas Ishak Nation presents a 1781 census (Note: Specifically April 1st, 1781.) of the Church of Attacapas (in current day-St. Martin's Parish) as a list of 'Indian names'. Scholar Renate Bartl writes that the names are mostly French and English, and only included free Black and "English" people.

She says it is highly questionable the names are Atakapa, due to the census listing every single person living in the church parish. She writes that the claim of the group to Native American identity is highly questionable as a result, and labels it noncredible.

=== 19th century ===
Historians Ted Campbell and Geoffrey Kimball link the historical Atakapa tribe to the Atakapa Ishak Nation, using Atakapa Ishāk to describe both the historic tribe and modern day claimants. They write that changing racial classifications in public records, including identities that were "consistently unrecognized in censuses" for Atakapa descendants, and the loss of central political organization after Chief Lo's death around 1850, obscured continuing Atakapa identity, writing that the Atakapa Ishāk "did not 'die out' and they are not 'extinct' today".

==== Indian Removal (1820s) ====
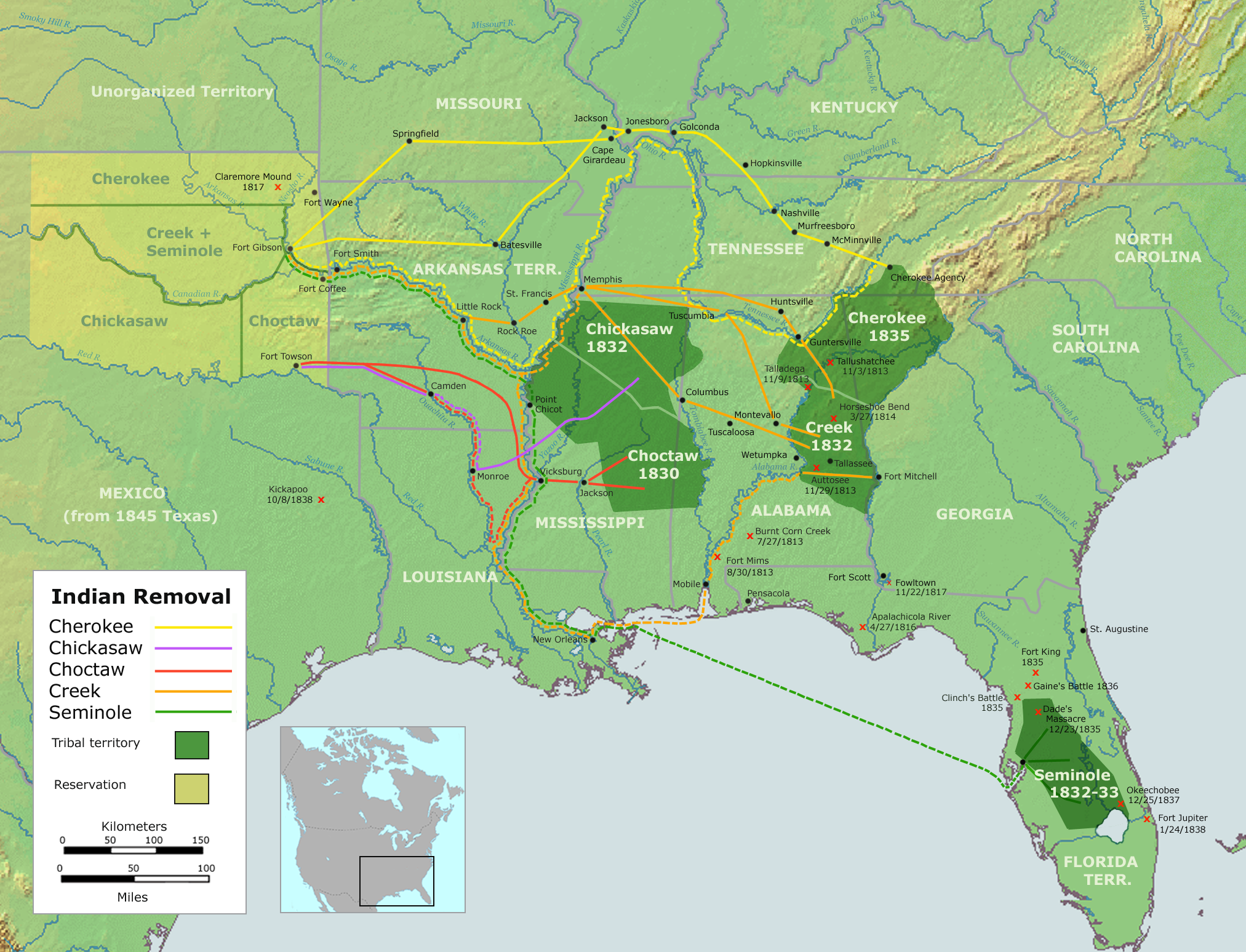
Former Texas sub-chief Mary Leblanc said Indian Removal was underway in the 1820s, so the Atakapa Ishak Nation hid in swamps to avoid Europeans.

When questioned about how the Atakapa Ishak Nation avoided Indian Removal (1830–1847), former Texas sub-chief Mary Leblanc said they heard 'gossip' from a large group of Cherokee, who she said were migrating into the area in the 1820s to escape Cherokee removal (1838–1839). She said the Cherokee said that Indian Removal was underway in multiple areas, and the ancestors of the Atapaka Ishak Nation hid in local swamps in response.

==== Postbellum (1870) ====
Leblanc said they did not have significant issues until after the American Civil War in 1870, when whites began moving to the area in larger numbers. She said they stayed in the swamps due to hostility towards them.

=== 20th century ===
The Atakapa Ishak Nation state they were misidentified as 'Creoles, Creole Indians [sic], and Creoles of Color.'

Bartl writes that Andrew Jolivette "argues that all Creoles living in the United States are of partly Native American ancestry and therefore share a Native American ethnic identity." She says some Creole communities have intermixed with Native Americans, but says these cases are limited to certain local areas, giving the Verdin family of the United Houma Nation as an example. Bartl writes that neither the Louisiana Creole Heritage Center nor standard literature on Creoles and Louisiana Native Americans "define Creole identity as being partly Native American."

In Swamp Souths, scholar, Rain Prud'homme-Cranford writes that according to Atakapa-Ishak Nation tribal member Jeffrey Darensbourg, he says that the "tribe has historically interwoven itself with African peoples who've found themselves on our lands, so much so that we have sometimes referred to ourselves as 'Creole Indians.'"

==== The Dummyline (1930s) ====
Linguist David Kaufman and council member Darensbourg write that Hubert Singleton self-published several books about tribal history and language, including The Dummyline: A Neighborhood Unique in which he described the Dummyline, an impoverished area in Lake Charles. He said Atakapa lived there in the 1930s.

==== Migrations ====
Mary Leblanc said that most of the tribe had come out of hiding by the 1950s. In a 1996 interview, Singleton, described as an Atakapa, said that some families in a first wave of emigration had moved to cities in the Great Lakes region, and in a second wave, to the West Coast for employment and educational opportunities, with many children and grandchildren of these waves living in Chicago, Detroit, Los Angeles, and San Francisco.

==== Organization (1996) ====
Kaufman and Darensbourg write that that in 1996, the Atakapa-Ishak Nation of Southwest Louisiana and Southeast Texas was reorganized in Prairie Laurent, Louisiana. They say a majority of the work was carried out by retired linguist and member Hubert Singleton.

Singleton's self-published works of the 1990s such as The Indians Who Gave Us Zydeco are described by Darensbourg and Kaufman, who write that they describe tribal cultural influence in zydeco, food, (specifically maque choux) and place names. In The Indians Who Gave Us Zydeco, Singleton is described to have provided Ishak translations of the Paster Noster and Ave Maria alongside Christmas carols, Silent Night, and Away in a Manger.

Prud’homme-Cranford writes that Singleton in The Indians Who Gave Us Zydeco, proposes that the word "zydeco" comes from the Atakapa word for dance, "shi" and that word for youths, "ishol—Shi ishol" in its pronunciation and its translation by early Spanish and French settlers became "zy ikol" or "zydeco." She says that while Singleton's claim strengthens the Indigenous roots of Zydeco, Ishak tribal members stand by the claim that zydeco is an Indigenous form of music, but disagree with Singleton's translation, citing a conversation with Darensbourg

Singleton described the planned gathering as a first time homecoming, with a short memorial for tribal ancestors along Lake Charles' eastern shore. A November 10th Southwest Daily News notice listed the display of tribal colors, prayers, address, a march to five ceremonial poles, and the placement of a memorial wreath and a ritual involving lake water.

In 1997, the Atakapa Ishak Nation's tribal council was formed. They elected Shirley Barnaba as tribal president, who was still serving as president in 2003.

=== 21st century ===
==== 2006 reunion ====
Historians Ted Campbell and linguist Geoffrey Kimball write that the Atakapa Ishak held a reunion in 2006 and describe the Atakapa Ishak Nation as seeking informal and formal recognition. They write that "their descendants [Atakapa-Ishāk] today are seldom recognized". An article in The Beaumont Enterprise dates the Nation's formation to the same year, saying council member Mary Leblanc was an organizer of the event. She was quoted as saying that members of the tribe were seeking a more formal arrangement. Mary LeBlanc was reported to teach children Atakapan arts over the summers.

In a column published on November 26th that year, Velmer Smith described the event occurring in Crosby, Texas. She writes that it was the time the first in over 100 years that 450 Atakapa Ishak people met "as One Nation." She said that Rachel Mouton, the Atakapa Ishak Nation's director of publications and communications, conducted the meeting and presented a short history of the Ishak people, while Billy LaChapelle, who she identified as an Atakapa descendant, opened the reunion with a prayer in English and Atakapa. The Atakapa Ishak Nation's Chief, Michael Amos introduced Louisiana council participants, including Hugh Singleton. Smith wrote the gathering ended with a blanketing ceremony honoring Singleton for his work in bringing awareness to Atakapa Ishak history.

==== Official formation ====
In 2008, the Atakapa Ishak Nation formed the Atakapa Ishak Tribe of Southeast Texas and Southwest Louisiana, a 501(c)(3) nonprofit organization, based in Lake Charles, Louisiana, Edward Chretien Jr. is listed as president. Council member Jeffery Darensbourg says it is the largest organized Ishak group.

== Recognition efforts ==
=== State recognition efforts ===
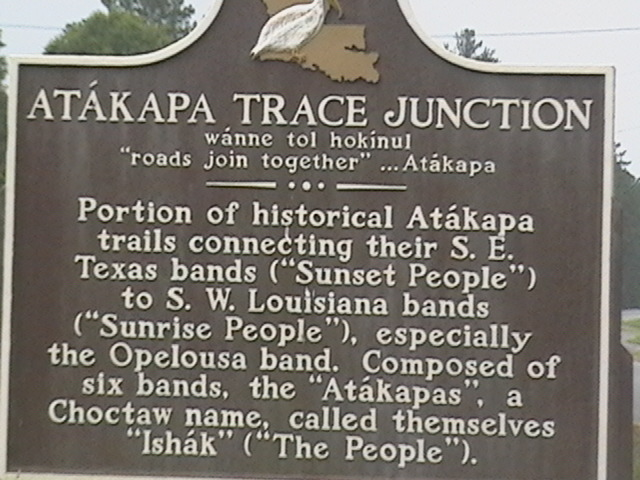
The Atakapa Trace Junction historical marker erected in 2003

==== 2003 state recognition campaign ====
In May 2003, American Press reporter, Shawn Martin, describes that House Concurrent Resolution 150 (HCR 150) filed by Louisiana representative, Elcie J. Guillory, D-Lake Charles, to recognize the Atakapa-Ishak Tribe of Southwest Louisiana as an Indian tribe of the state, was submitted to the Criminal Justice Committee for a hearing. The resolution described by Martin states that the Atakapa-Ishak Tribe of Southwest Louisiana has existed in Southwest Louisiana since prehistoric times based on the findings of ethnological work by Albert Gatschet and John Swanton of the Smithsonian Institute, and that tribal members have served the United States in all of its wars and "have been good citizens and have contributed to the state of Louisiana for over three centuries." Barnaba and Guillory said they sought recognition for historical reasons and not for gaming purposes. Guillory planned to invite tribal representatives, Singleton, Barnaba, and Velmer Smith to testify before the committee. Barnaba was reported saying that at the time, members were meeting at St. Jules Catholic Church, and that she had planned on consulting church officials about records that document descendants. She also says that the Chitimacha Tribe had invited the tribe to a Native American celebration scheduled for June 8th of that year. Smith is also reported to of helped place a historical marker earlier that year, recognizing the Atakapa-Ishak Indians on U.S. 190 in the Junction Community of Beauregard Parish.

On June 4th, 2003, the committee considered HCR 150. After a discussion that lasted 45 minutes, it voted 5-2 to defer the resolution. The American Press reported that the measure was dead for that legislative session. Committee chairman, Representative Danny Martiny, R-Metairie, said that Louisiana lacked specific criteria for state recognition of tribes, and that legislators are reluctant to recognize tribes due to concerns about Indian casinos. Guillory following the vote, said he would propose a different measure to study the possibility of establishing criteria for state tribal recognition. Martiny said that the problem was not with current tribal members, but rather other tribes who are not as well intentioned as the Atakapa-Ishak, that will use a lack of criteria as an excuse to open casinos. Tribal president, Barnaba said the tribe only wanted recognition for historical reasons only. Velmer Smith testified to the committee that both tribal members and local residents did not want an Indian casino.

==== 2009 state recognition campaign ====
In May 2009, Representative Albert Franklin for D-Lake Charles introduced House Concurrent Resolution 74, assigned to the Criminal justice Committee. The resolution stated that the modern Atakapa had adopted a compound name of Atakapa-Ishak, and that modern research had shown that members of Atakapa-Ishak Tribe of Southwest Louisiana have maintained the Atakapa language, in addition to their culture. Louisiana rejected the Atakapa Ishak Nation's application for state recognition.

=== Federal recognition efforts ===
In 2007, the Atakapa-Ishak Nation of Southeast Texas and Southwest Louisiana sent a letter of intent to petition for federal recognition.

The Atakapa Ishak Nation's recognition project involved documenting the lineage and ancestry of approximately 4,500 people believed to have Atakapa descent. During this process, there were disagreements over leadership and local control amongst the people living across southeastern Texas and Southwestern Louisiana.

==== Split into three factions ====
The tribe split into three factions after the election of Edward Chretien Jr. as chief, amid complaints the family was ill organized. Chretien says that half of the 1,800 members, who paid dues to the tribe, had broken away. The Beaumont Enterprise wrote that Chretien and the other leaders said the decision could hinder federal recognition, and that membership of the splinters could be excluded once the family received recognition.

The tribe's petition is considered inactive, per a letter sent to the nation by the Interior Department on January 23, 2014 following an inquiry as to whether Atakapa-Ishak could move forward in the petition process, circumventing Chretien.

==== Post-split ====
In November 2024, Texas A&M University's Department of History denotes that historian W. Dale Weeks was helping the Atakapa-Ishak tribe seek federal recognition so its leadership could pursue funding for community needs.

In 2025, KPLC reported that the nation's chief-in-waiting Maaliyah Papillon said the federal recognition process of who counts as Indigenous does not consider Louisiana's multicultural roots. She said that the government invented a "blood quantum test" one had to pass.

== Language and cultural work ==
=== Language renewal ===
Writing in 2019, linguist David Kaufman and council member Jeffrey Darensbourg reported they knew of no fluent or near fluent speakers. They write that the last fluent speaker of Ishak died sometime between 1946 and 1970, with some tribal members of the Atakapa Ishak Nation recalling deceased relatives 'who spoke some Indian'. They identify surviving fragments from Alvin "Pem" Broussard, identified as an Ishak-Cajun artist in Coteau Holmes, knowing phrases learned directly from speakers decades earlier. Darensbourg and Kaufman also assert that the previous dictionary in 1932 by Gatschet and Swanton was an obstacle to learners, with both authors writing that a new then forthcoming single volume dictionary was being written by linguist Kaufman with support from the Atakapa Ishak Tribe to solve the organizational issues of the previous 1932 dictionary.

==== Dictionary ====
David Kaufman's Atakapa Ishākkoy Dictionary, first issued in 2019, later appeared in a revised second edition, published in 2022. The dictionary includes contributions from members of the Atakapa-Ishak Nation discussing its use in language renewal, with Kaufman also recognizing the foundation of Ishākkoy language revitalization by Hugh Singleton, and thanking other Ishāk community members. Kaufman also describes in his dictionary, meetings with Atakapa Ishak Nation members who were relearning the language. Darensbourg in Kaufman's dictionary also notes that Donna Pierite of the Tunica-Biloxi Tribe helped in efforts on consulting for words in the dictionary, helping change the original Ishākkoy term for "monkey", which was originally kush mēl tikáw (like a black person) to wulkishāk tikáw (like a raccoon man).

== Writers, artists, and film ==
Jeffery Darensbourg.

Jeffery Darensbourg is an Atakapa-Ishak council member and tribal representative, who publishes the zine Bulbancha Is Still a Place. His visual poem, Bulbancha #2, was shown at the 2019 New Orleans Poetry Festival. Darensbourg is a Louisiana Creole, and also identifies as Choctaw.

In April 2025, KPLC, identifies Maaliyah Papillon as the tribes chief-in-waiting, and reports that her self directed documentary, Ishak, which presented the community through the experiences of Papillon learning from elders was scheduled for broadcast on Louisiana Public Broadcasting. The American Press reported a screening and presentation by Papillon, in Lake Charles on April 8th of that year, addressing local Atakapa-Ishak history and ongoing efforts to preserve culture and language.

=== Andrew Jolivette ===
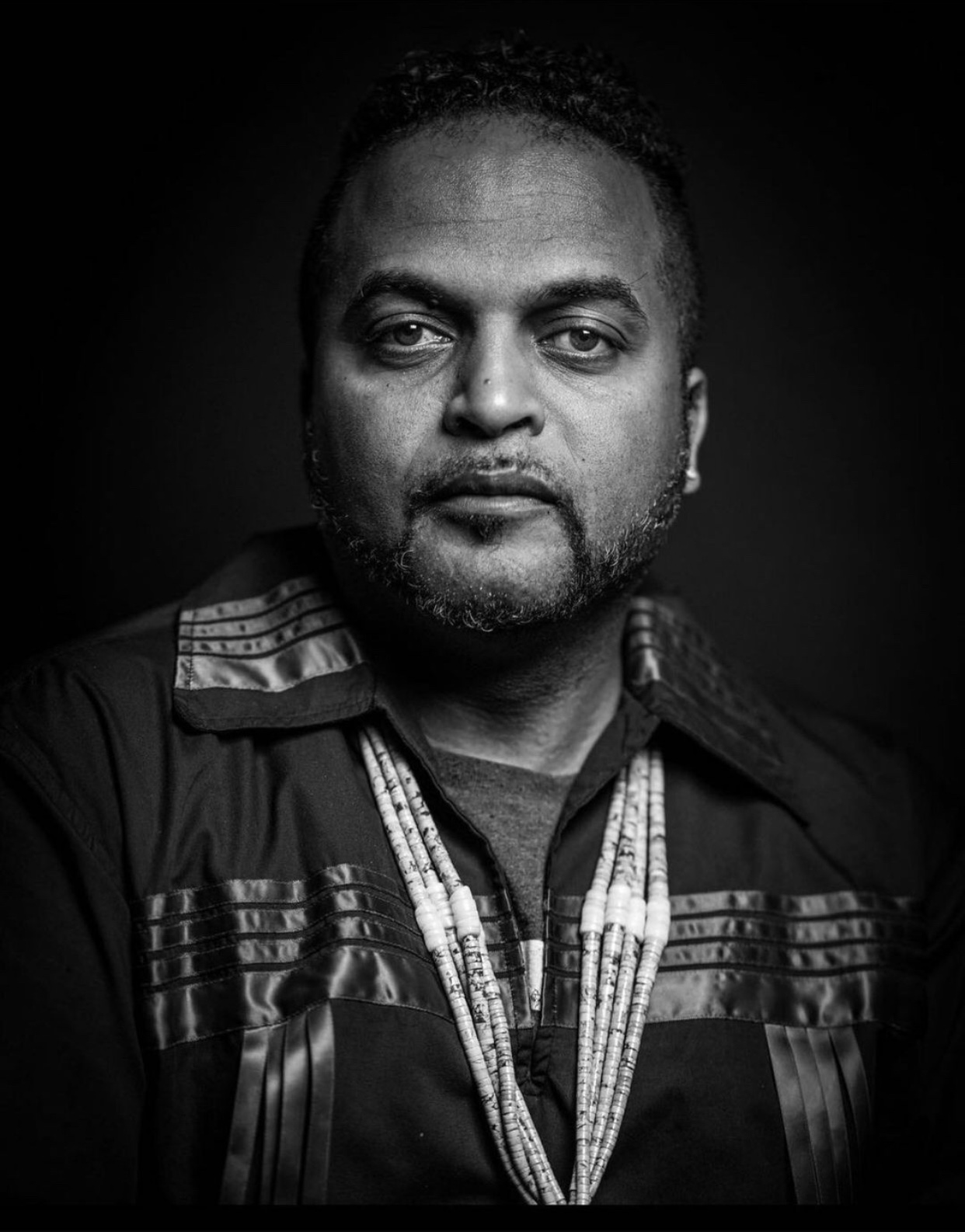
Andrew Jolivette.

Andrew Jolivette is a member of the Atakapa Ishak Nation and a sociologist. He was formerly the historian of the Atakapa Ishak Nation and is a Louisiana Creole.

In The Oxford Handbook of Indigenous Sociology, Jolivette discusses kinship and responsibilities toward land and community from the perspective of his own Atakapa family and affiliation. Jolivette writes on his great grandmother who was a traiteur, or medicine person and says she worked to heal blood illness and blood related conditions, and uses the expression wi hokišak kuš, meaning that people are related or connected to describe an Ishak understanding of responsibilities extending to land, water, ceremony, and medicine.

== See also ==
- Grand Bayou Indian Village
- Apalachee Indians Talimali Band
- List of organizations that self-identify as Native American tribes
- Talimali Band of Apalachee Indians
- Self-categorization theory
- Social identity theory
