= Bidai language =

Extinct language of eastern Texas, United States

Bidai
- Quasmigdo
- Native to: United States
- Region: Texas
- Ethnicity: Bidai
- Extinct: 19th century?
- Language family: unclassified (language isolate? Atakapan?)

Language codes
- ISO 639-3: None (mis)
- Glottolog: bida1238

Bidai (also spelled Beadeye, Bedias, Bidey, Viday, etc.; autonym: Quasmigdo) is an unclassified extinct language formerly spoken by the Bidai people of eastern Texas. Zamponi (2024) notes that the numerals do not appear to be related to those of any other languages and hence proposes that Bidai may be a language isolate.

== Word list ==
Rufus Grimes, a Texan settler in Navasota, Grimes County, sent a letter dated November 15, 1887, to Albert S. Gatschet that contained several Bidai words. The word list was published in Gatschet (1891: 39, fn. 2).

gloss	Bidai
one	namah
two	nahonde
three	naheestah
four	nashirimah
five	nahot nahonde
six	nashees nahonde
boy	púskus
corn	tándshai

== Comparison of numerals ==
Below is Zamponi's (2024) comparison of Bidai numerals with those of neighboring languages.

language	one	two	three	four	five	six
Bidai	namah	nahonde	naheestah	nashirimah	nahot nahonde	nashees nahonde
W. Atakapa	tanuʹk, taʹnuk	tsīk	lāt	(h)imatoʹl	nīt, nit	latsīʹk
Karankawa	náatsa	háikia	kaxáji	hájo hakn	náatsa béhema	hájo háikia
Tonkawa	we·ʔis-pax	ketay	metis	sikit	kaskwa	sikwa·law
Caddo	’wísts’i’	bít	daháw’	híwí’	diːsik’an	dáːnkih
Adai	nancas	nass	colle	tacache	seppacan	pacanancus
Mobilian Jargon	(a)čaf(f)a	tok(o)lo	točena	ošta	taɫape	han(n)ale

Anthony Grant (1995) finds the following cognates shared with Choctaw and Mobilian Jargon.

language	boy	corn
Bidai	púskus	tándshai
Choctaw	poškoš ~ poskos ‘child’	tãci’
Mobilian Jargon	posko(š) ~ poškoš ‘baby, child’	tãče ‘baby, child’

== See also ==
- Akokisa language
- Bayogoula language
- Calusa language
- Congaree language
- Cusabo language
- Guale language
- Sewee language
- Shoccoree-Eno language
