= Bayou Nezpique =

River in Louisiana, United States

Coordinates: 30.2040°N 92.5863°W

Nezpique River (locally pronounced /ˈnɛpəkeɪ/, translated to "tattooed nose bayou") is a small river located in the Mermentau River basin of south Louisiana, USA. The river is 70 miles (110 km) long and is navigable by small shallow-draft boats for 23 miles (37 km) of lower course.

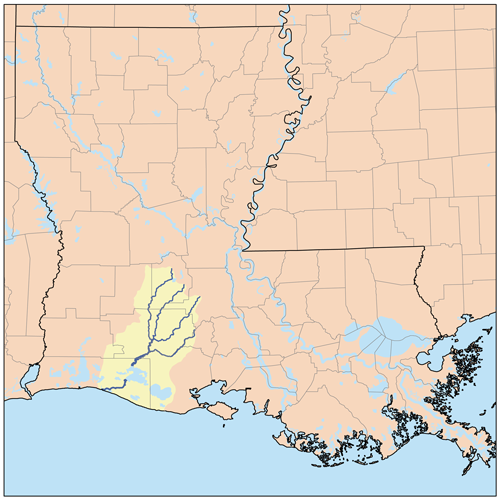
Map of the Mermentau River watershed showing the Mermantau River and its four largest tributaries (from left to right) River Nezpique, Bayou des Cannes, Bayou Plaquemine Brule, and Bayou Queue de Tortue.

The area was first settled by the Attakapa Indian tribe but the river was named by French colonists after the Attakapa village along the Bayou Nezpiqué.

Later William Wikoff bought property here, some 2,733 acres (11 km^{2}) on the west bank of the river, from Le Tortue, an Attakapa Indian, and his son Celestine. Le Tortue (tortoise in French) was chief of the village of Nezpiqué; the transaction was recorded in 1791. In 1932, linguist William A. Read explained that the word Nezpiqué, or "tattooed nose", "simply emphasizes the fact that the Indians in its vicinity practiced the art of tattooing."

The river depth in the Upper Bayou region in Evangeline Parish is about 7–10 feet average, while in the lower river course, it deepens to about 35–40 feet average.

Since the late 20th century, the Nezpique River is controlled by the Upper Bayou Nezpique No 7 Dam, which was completed in 1970 in Evangeline Parish. The dam was constructed for flood control purposes and its normal surface area is 1 acre (4,000 m^{2}). It is of earth construction and its length is 1,741 feet (531 m). Maximum discharge is 746 cubic feet (21.1 m^{3}) per second. Its capacity is 1,500 acre-feet (1,900,000 m^{3}).

The River also contains the Crooked Creek Reservoir, which is impounded by the Upper Bayou Nezpique No 3 Dam in Evangeline Parish, which is used for flood control and recreation purposes. Construction was completed in 1974 and it has a normal surface area of 432 acres (1.7 km^{2}).

== See also ==
- List of rivers in Louisiana
