= Bayou Queue de Tortue =

Waterway in the Mermentau River basin of south Louisiana

Coordinates: 30.0927°N 92.6259°W

Bayou Queue de Tortue (pronounced "KYOOD tor-TYOO", in Cajun French [t͡ʃœd.tɔɾ.t͡ʃy], translated to "turtle-tail bayou") is a waterway in the Mermentau River basin of southern Louisiana in the United States. The bayou is 55 miles (89 km) long and is partly navigable.

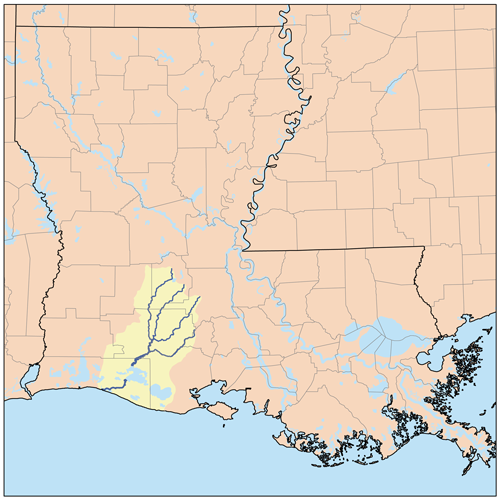
Map of the Mermentau River watershed showing the Mermentau River and its 4 largest tributaries (from left to right) Bayou Nezpique, Bayou des Cannes, Bayou Plaquemine Brule, and Bayou Queue de Tortue

The bayou begins near Lafayette and forms the natural boundary separating Lafayette Parish and Acadia Parish to the west and Acadia Parish and Vermilion Parish to the south.

The area was first settled by the Attakapa Indian tribe. Bayou Queue de Tortue is believed to have been named for Chief Celestine La Tortue of the Attakapas nation. This name is used to describe the early village near Rayne called Queue de Tortue. The Queue de Tortue village was on property purchased from the Indians in 1801 by John Lyon, one of Acadia Parish's colonial settlers. He paid $87 for land on the south side of Bayou Queue de Tortue, in what is now Vermilion Parish, described as "fifty arpents front by the ordinary depth" of 40 arpents.

In the 1940s Bayou Queue de Tortue flooded the town of Gueydan. Vermilion Parish constructed a small levee in the 1950s. This levee closed off normal flowage of Maree Michel Canal into Bayou Queue de Tortue, but also prevented floodwaters from inundating Gueydan during reverse flow or other flooding situations. From historical maps, this levee was increased in height and possible length from approximately 7 feet (2.1 m) to 12 feet (3.7 m) in height. Today, the bayou is silting, causing additional flooding in low-lying areas of Acadia Parish that kills the existing vegetation, which in turn increases erosion and sedimentation that fills the bayou.

== See also ==
- List of rivers in Louisiana
