= Andrew Jolivette =

American sociologist

Andrew Jolivétte
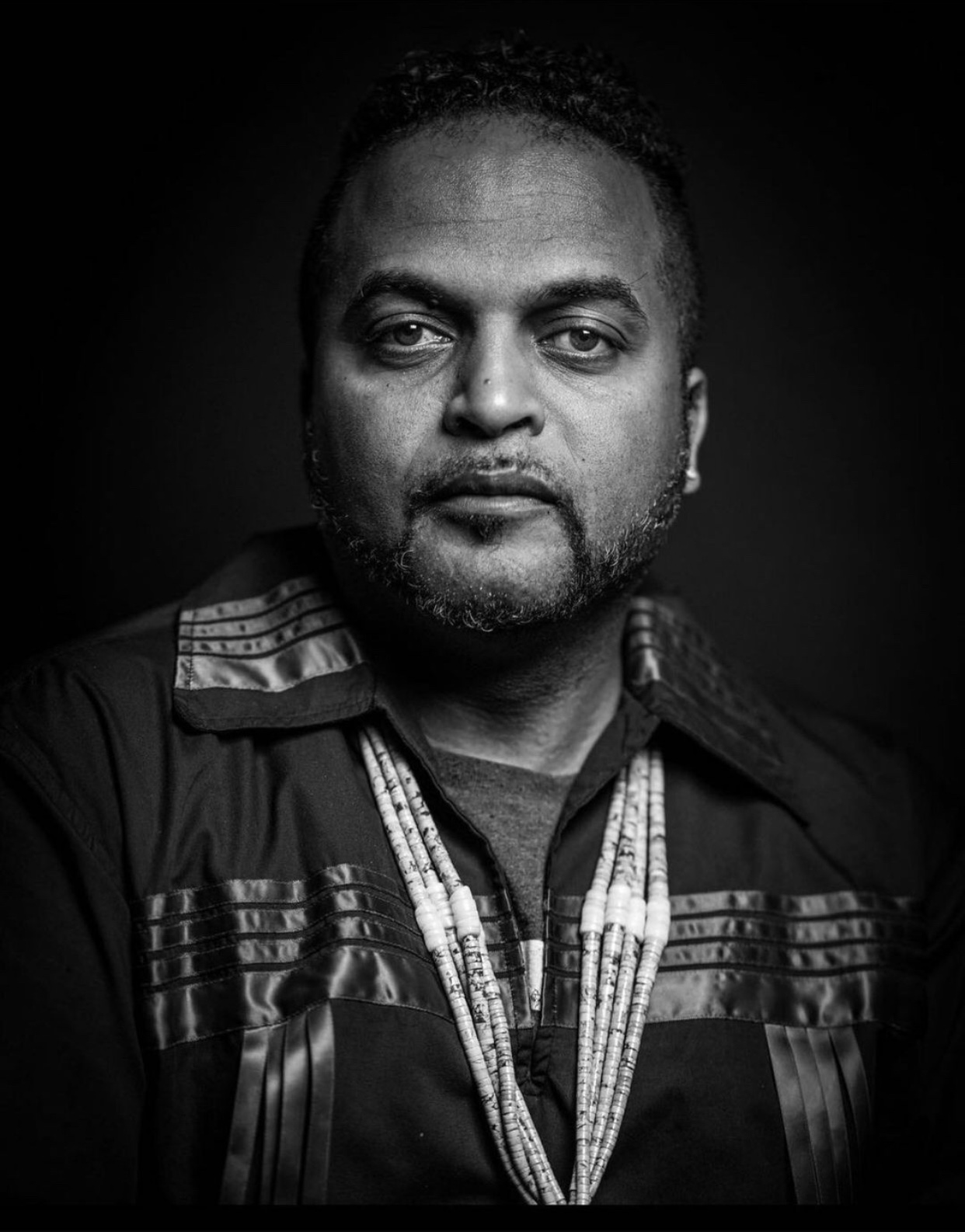
- Born: Andrew James Jolivette; 1975 (age 50–51)
- Occupation: Sociologist

Academic background
- Education: University of San Francisco (BA); San Francisco State University (MA); University of California, Santa Cruz (PhD)
- Thesis: Creole Diaspora: (Re)articulating the Social, Legal, Economic, and Regional Construction of American Indian Identity (2003)

Academic work
- Discipline: Ethnic studies
- Institutions: University of California–San Diego

Andrew James Jolivétte is an American sociologist and author. He is a professor at the University of California, San Diego, where he is chair of the department of Ethnic Studies. He is the co-chair of UC Ethnic Studies Council.

He is a member of the Atakapa Ishak Nation of Louisiana.

== Background ==
Jolivétte was born in San Francisco in 1975 to Annetta Donan Foster Jolivette and Kenneth Louis Jolivétte. Born and raised in San Francisco, he attended Catholic schools and lived in the Bay Area for decades before moving to Southern California. He is a Louisiana Creole, and writes that the United States should recognize all Creoles of color as American Indians.

Jolivétte is a member of the Atakapa Ishak Nation of Louisiana, which is based in Lake Charles, Louisiana and is an unrecognized tribe. The organization claims descent from Atakapa, also known as Ishak, and is neither a federally recognized tribe or a state-recognized tribe. He says he is also of Opelousa, Kaskaskia, Chitimacha, Mi'kmaq, Metis, Algonquin, and Coahuiltecan descent. (Note: In addition, he says he is of Nigerian, Senegambian, Ghanaian, Cameroonian, Guinean, French, Spanish, Italian, Cajun, Mexican, Congolese, Angolan, Southern East African, Canadian, Isleño, Irish, Haitian, Portuguese, English, Scottish, and German descent.) He writes that activist Jacqueline Keeler operates through a 'colonial framework' when requiring government recognition of Native American identity, and spoke in defence of Andrea Smith when she committed Indigenous identity fraud.

He was the focus of an investigation by Keeler, questioning the legitimacy of his tribe.

== Education ==
Jolivétte earned his bachelor's degree in sociology with a minor in English literature and a certificate in ethnic studies from the University of San Francisco. He earned his master's degree in sociology from San Francisco State University in 1999. His thesis was titled, "Native America: White Indians, Black Indians and the Contemporary Privilege of Color." He earned his doctoral degree in sociology from the University of California, Santa Cruz in 2003, with a dissertation titled "Creole Diaspora: (Re)articulating the Social, Legal, Economic, and Regional Construction of American Indian Identity."

== Career ==
Jolivétte was a professor and chair of the American Indian studies department at San Francisco State University from 2010 to 2016. He became the founding Director of the Native American and Indigenous Studies (NAIS) Program at the University of California, San Diego, in 2020. The NAIS Program includes a minor, graduate certificate, and culture bearer-in-residence program. Jolivétte is co-chair of the University of California Ethnic Studies Council.

He was formerly the historian of the Atakapa Ishak Nation.

=== Commentary ===
Scholar Renate Bartl writes that Jolivétte misquoted sources in his work. In The Cane River Creoles of Color (Mills 1977), she says he quotes that ancestress Marie Thérèze Coincoin was 'of African and indigenous American origins', when the text, and the sources used by Mills, only specify her being of African origins. She spotlights a directly modified passage, which he cites from Mills:

...Coincoin turned to African and Indigenous American cultural remedies including a knowledge of herbal medicines gained from her own parents. (Jolivétte 2007, 13)

whereas Mills writes: "Marie Thérèze, who has gained from her African parents a knowledge of herbal medicines..." (Mills 1977, xxvii). Bartl writes that this, in addition to other discrepancies, harm the scientific reliability of the work presented.

== Bibliography ==
- Cultural Representation in Native America. Rowman Altamira. 2006. ISBN 0-7591-0985-0.
- Louisiana Creoles: Cultural Recovery and Mixed-race Native American Identity. Lexington Books. 2007. ISBN 978-0-7391-1896-2.
- Obama and the Biracial Factor: The Battle for a New American Majority. Policy Press. 2012. ISBN 978-1447301004.
- Research Justice: Methodologies for Social Change. Policy Press. 2015. ISBN 978-1447324638.
- Indian Blood: HIV and Colonial Trauma in San Francisco's Two-Spirit Community. University of Washington Press. 2016. ISBN 978-0295998503.
- American Indian and Indigenous Education: A Survey Text for the 21st Century. Cognella. 2019. ISBN 978-1516590438.
- Louisiana Creole Peoplehood: Afro-Indigeneity and Community. University of Washington Press. 2021. ISBN 9780295749495.
- Gumbo Circuitry: Poetic Routes, Gastronomic Legacies. That Painted Horse Press. 2022. ISBN 978-1928708155.

=== Anthologies ===
- Crash Course: Reflections on the Film Crash for Critical Dialogues About Race, Power, and Privilege, ed. Michael Benitez Jr. and Felicia Gustin (2007).
- John Brown Childs, Hurricane Katrina: Response and Responsibilities, ed. John Brown Childs (2005)
- "Critical Mixed Race Studies: New Approaches to Resistance and Social Justice," in Color Struck: Essays on Race and Ethnicity in Global Perspective, ed. Julius Adekunle and Hettie V Williams (2010).
