= Bidai =

Historic Native American tribe of eastern Texas

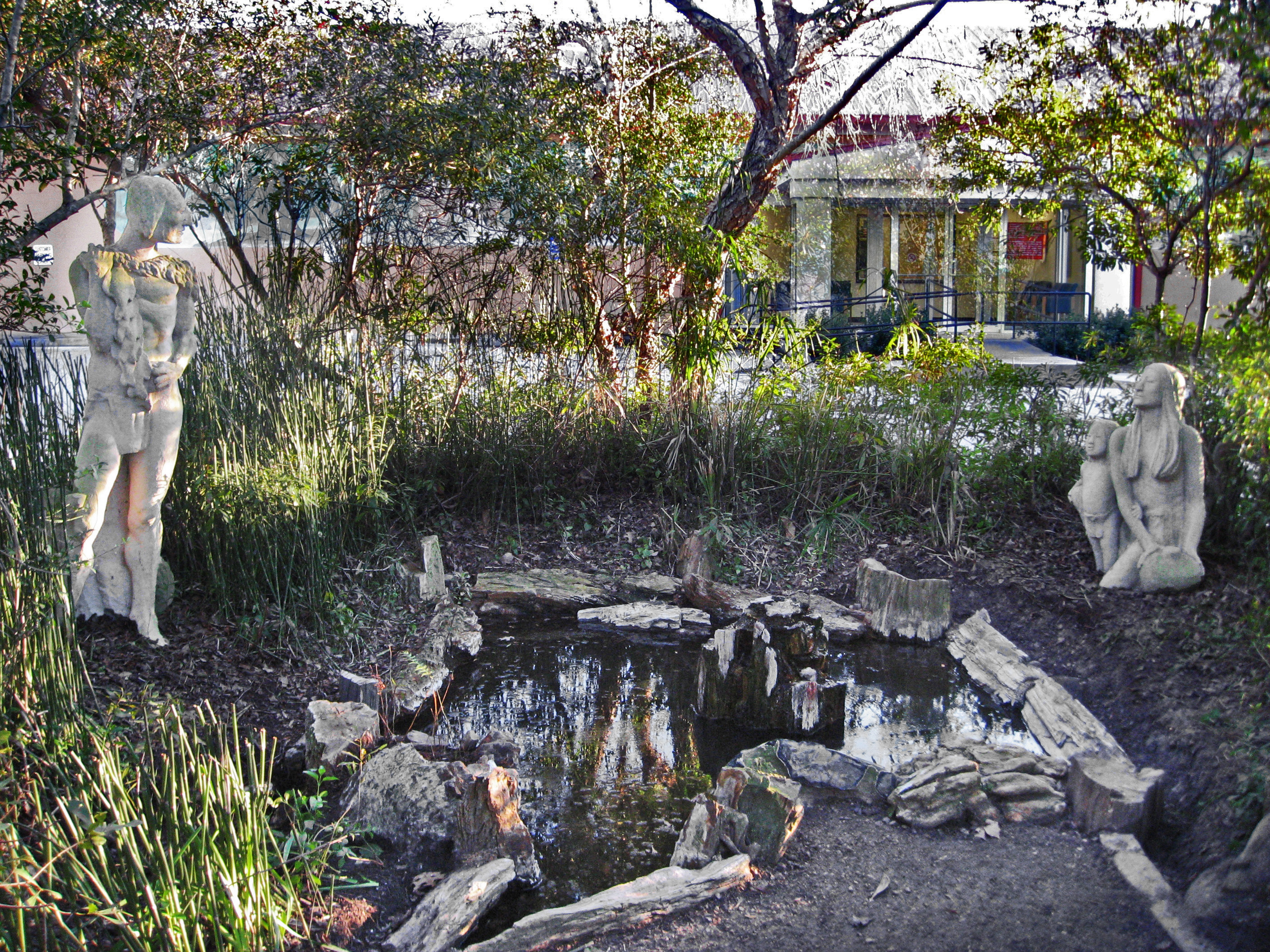
- A tribute to the Bidai tribe, in Huntsville, Texas

Total population
- Extinct as a tribe, descendants merged with the Caddo

Regions with significant populations
- Eastern Texas, U.S.

Languages
- Bidai language

The Bidai, who referred to themselves as the Quasmigdo, were a tribe of American Indians from eastern Texas.

The name Bidai is Caddo language term for "brushwood".

== History ==
Their oral history says that the Bidai were the original people in their region.

=== 17th century ===
Their central settlements were along Bedias Creek that flows into the Trinity River, but their territory ranged from the Brazos River to the Neches River. The first written record of the tribe was in 1691, by Spanish explorers who said they lived near the Hasinai.

=== 18th century ===
French explorer François Simars de Bellisle described them as agriculturalists in 1718 and 1720. He wrote that they were allied with the Akokisa.

They had three distinct villages or bands in the 18th century. The Deadose were the northernmost band of Bidai, who broke off in the early 18th century. The 18th-century population of Bidai was estimated to be 600 with 200 additional Deadoses.

In the mid-18th century, some Bidai settled at Mission San Francisco Xavier de Horcasitas. In 1770, the Bidai colluded with French settlers to sell guns to the Lipan Apaches, as all parties were enemies with the Spanish.

The Bidai suffered several epidemics during 1776–77, reducing their population by at least half, from about 100 to 50. The survivors joined neighboring tribes, such as the Akokisas and Koasati.

=== 19th century ===
Some settled on the Brazos Indian Reservation in present-day Young County, Texas, and were removed with the Caddo to Indian Territory. The remaining Bidai formed one village about 12 miles from Montgomery, Texas, growing corn and picking cotton for hire in the mid-19th century.

=== 20th century ===
Ethnographer John Reed Swanton identified one Bidai descendant in 1912. Andre Sjoberg published an ethnohistory of the Bidai in 1951.

== Lifeways ==
The Bidai hunted, gathered, fished, grew maize, and bartered their surplus maize. They snared game and trapped them in cane pens. During the summer months, they lived along the coasts, but in winters they moved inland in which they lived in bearskin tents.

Before contact, the Bidai made their own ceramics but quickly adopted metal utensils from European trade. They still made pottery into the 19th century and also wove a variety of baskets. In 1803, Dr. John Sibley wrote that Bidai had "an excellent character for honesty and punctuality."

The structure of their cradleboards altered the shape of their skulls. They also enhanced their appearance through body and facial tattooing.

Bidai medicine men were herbalists and performed sweatbathing. Patients could be treated by being raised on scaffolds over smudge fires. While other Atakapan bands are known for their ritual cannibalism, the practice was never recorded among the Bidai.

== Language ==
Bidai was a possible language isolate that became extinct by the end of the 19th century. The only attested Bidai words are:

- namah (one)
- nahone (two)
- naheestah (three)
- nashirimah (four)
- nahot nahonde (five)
- nashees nahonde (six)
- púskus (boy)
- tándshai (corn)

== Name ==
Bidai has been spelled Biday, Bedies, Bidaises, Beadweyes, Bedies, Bedees, Bidias, Bedais, Midays, Vidais, Vidaes, Vidays. Their name could be Caddo, meaning "brushwood", and having reference to the Big Thicket near the lower Trinity River about which they lived. Their autonym was Quasmigdo.
