= Attakapas County, Orleans Territory =

Administrative subdivision, 1805–1807

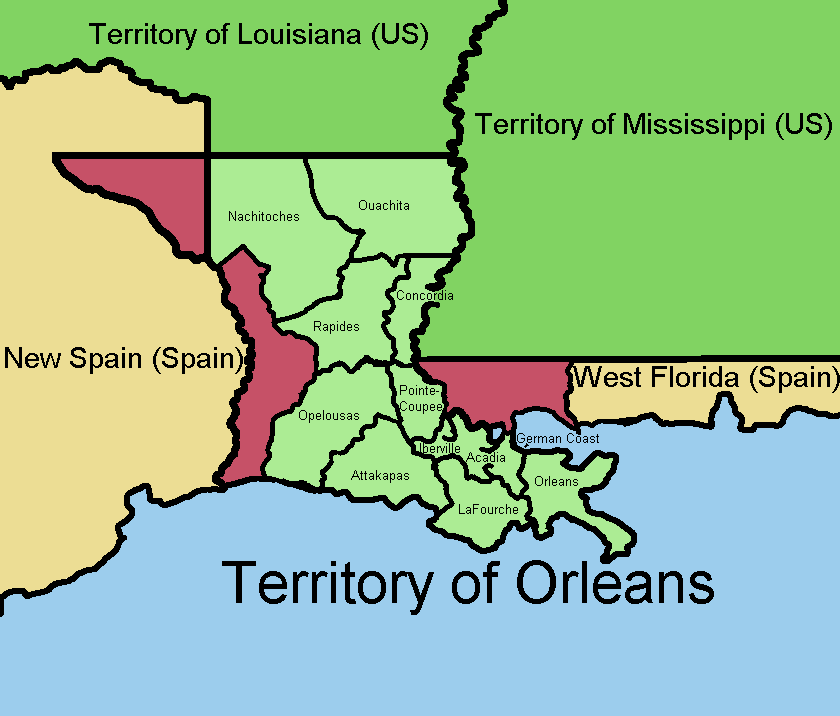
Map of Orleans Territory in 1804; Attakapas Parish is in the south

Attakapas Parish, a former parish (county) in southern Louisiana, was one of the twelve parishes in the Territory of Orleans, newly defined by the United States federal government following its Louisiana Purchase in 1803.

== Early history ==
Prior to European colonization, the area was primarily home to the Atakapa tribe.

== Foundation ==
Attakapas Parish was formally created from the Attakapas and Opelousas districts in 1805 by Governor William C. C. Claiborne. It occupied the triangle between the Mermentau River on the west, the Atchafalaya River on the east, and the Gulf of Mexico to the south.

In 1811, the parish was divided into St. Martin and St. Mary parishes. As population increased, the region was further subdivided in 1823, 1844, and 1868 to create Lafayette, Vermillion, and Iberia parishes, respectively.

== Colonial settlement ==
The first Europeans arrived in the 1730s, and they were predominantly French or of French descent.

=== Acadian migrations ===
In the 1760s and 1780s, following British victory over France in the Seven Years War, it took over French territory in North America east of the Mississippi River. They expelled most Acadians from their homes in Nova Scotia; some were resettled among various French and (other) British domains: the thirteen British Atlantic coast colonies, England, France, Saint-Domingue, Cayenne (French Guiana), and the Falkland Islands.

In 1765 Joseph Broussard, also known as Beausoleil, led approximately 193 Acadians who had been involved in guerilla warfare against the British in Canada to settle in the Attakapas District. These early settlers were located between modern Breaux Bridge and Loreauville. This was two years after France had transferred most of its Louisiana colony to Spain (after losing the Seven Years' War), although the French colonial governor Charles Philippe Aubry was still in charge of this territory.

These settlers became the nexus for future waves of Acadian immigration, when their dispersed relatives could gather sufficient funds and permissions from the various national entities under whose control they found themselves.

== Military ==
At its core of the Attakapas country was the Poste des Attakapas trading post, which developed as the current city of St. Martinville. This was a French colonial garrison in the 1760s, and then a "remote outpost" when the Spaniards took over. The Americans used it as a "sporadically" garrisoned U.S. Army fort from 1804 to 1819.

== Slavery ==
By the time that the former Attakapas Territory/District became Attakapas Parish, the Acadians living there had developed a prosperous agricultural economy based on cattle, enhanced by small-scale vegetable and corn farming. They relied on the labor of enslaved African Americans. The Attakapas District census of 1803 listed "2,270 whites, 210 free people of color, 1,266 slaves; in all 3,746 souls."

The region became a major center of both Cajun culture and Creole culture in Louisiana. European Americans and African Americans both adhered to Catholicism, and French-influenced culture and language, as well as absorbing and sharing aspects of African American and Native American cultures, including food.

== See also ==
- St. Martin of Tours Catholic Church (St. Martinville, Louisiana)

== Sources ==
- Attakapas County Map, 1805. Encyclopedia Louisiana
