= Huntress (schooner) =

General characteristics
- Type: Slave ship
- Sail plan: Topsail hermaphrodite schooner

Huntress of New York was a topsail hermaphrodite schooner that transported slaves. Huntress was the last slave ship to leave the Congo region.

In March 1865, Huntress left with a capacity of 200 slaves headed for Louisiana. When the Slave Trade was made illegal in 1808, traders turned to fast ships, largely topsail schooners or brigs, to outrun the vessels of the British Royal Navy's West Africa Squadron and the U.S. Navy's African Slave Trade Patrol, whose role was to intercept slave ships and take them into custody.

"Negro Island" in the Mermentau River is rumored to have been the location where the slaves died. However, records show a Huntress type vessel landed a cargo of enslaved men and women in Cuba in 1864.
