= St. Martin of Tours Catholic Church (St. Martinville, Louisiana) =

Historic church in Louisiana, United States

- Saint Martin of Tours Catholic Church
- U.S. National Register of Historic Places
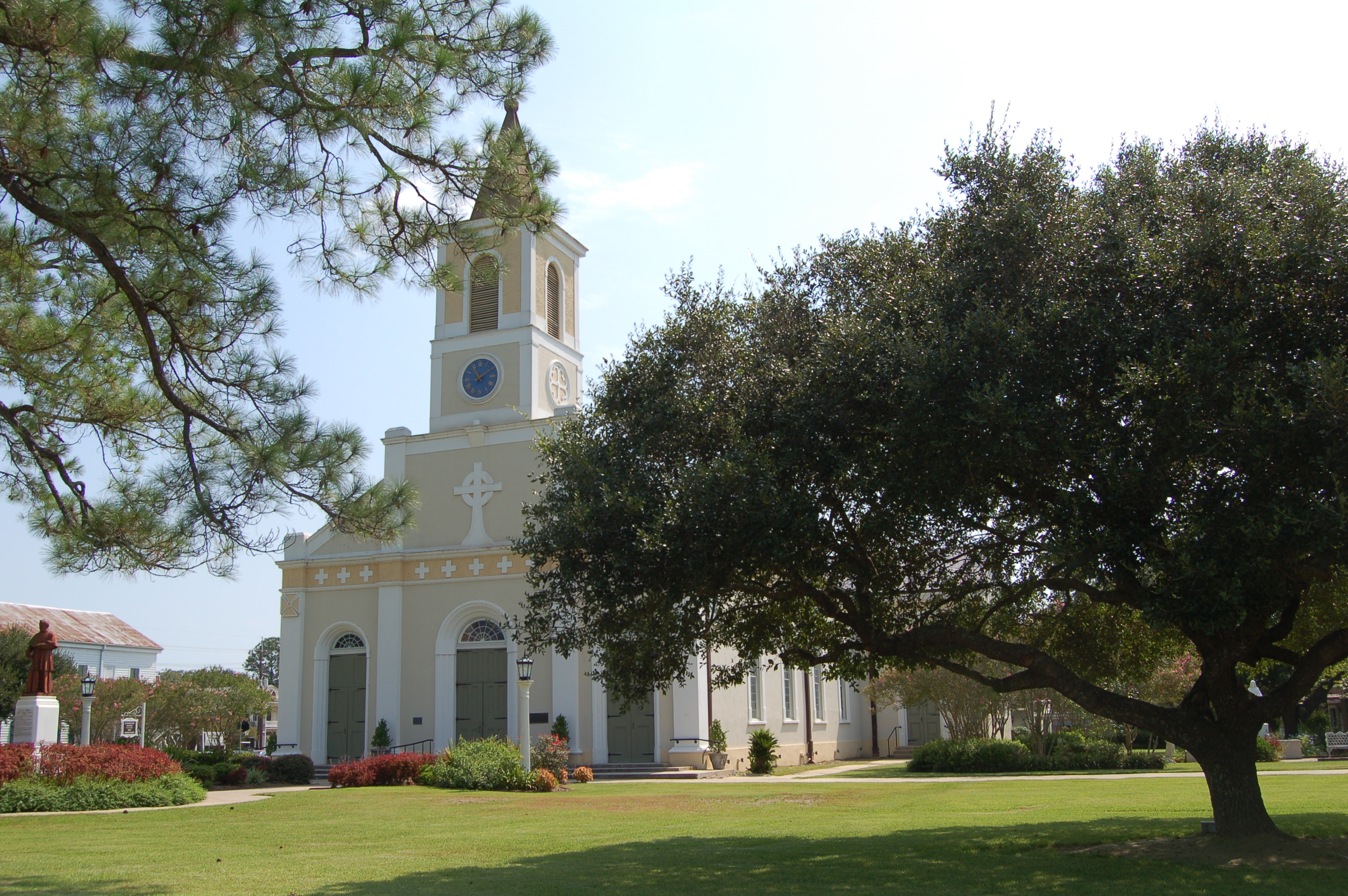

- Location within Louisiana Location within the United States
- Location: 133 S. Main St., Saint Martinville, Louisiana
- Coordinates: 30°7′22″N 91°49′41″W
- Area: 4.1 acres (1.7 ha)
- Built: 1840
- Architect: Robert R. Benson
- Architectural style: Romanesque
- NRHP reference No.: 72001454
- Added to NRHP: April 10, 1972

Saint Martin of Tours Catholic Church (French: Église catholique Saint Martin de Tours) is a historic church at 133 S. Main Street in Saint Martinville, Louisiana. The church was added to the National Register in 1972. It was formerly called the Attakapas Church (French: l'Église des Attakapas), when it was founded.

== Background ==
=== Founding ===
The church was founded in 1765 by Father Jean-Louis de Civrey and Acadian refugees settling in Atakapas district. He initially named it l'Église des Attakapas, or the Attakapas Church, which it was still called during the 1810 church census of Attakapas (St. Martin) Parish.

The first church was probably designed by French military engineer Lieutenant Louis Andry. The church was incorporated in 1814 by an act of the Louisiana legislature.

=== Current church ===
Another act passed in 1820 authorized the congregation to run a lottery to raise funds to build a new church. Completed in 1840, the current building was consecrated in 1844.

It was built originally as a simple rectangular plan church of the Roman basilica type, with the nave separated by a row of Doric columns from side aisles. It was expanded in the 1870s by addition of transepts and a semi-circular apse as well as by extension of the nave.

=== Monuments ===
Next to the church is a monument dedicated to the Militiamen of St. Martinville who fought in General Bernardo de Galvez's army at the Battle of Baton Rouge (1779). 36 of the militiamen were French Creoles, three were Acadians, and three colonial Americans, one's citizenship is not known. The monument was erected by the Louisiana Daughters of the American Revolution. There is a statue of Evangeline behind the church.

=== Census analysis ===
The recently created Atakapa Ishak Tribe of Southeast Texas and Southwest Louisiana states that all names listed on the 1781 census of St. Martin of Tours are 'Indian names'. Scholar Renate Bartl writes this is highly questionable, as the census represents all people in the parish at the time. She writes that the names are mostly French and English, and only included free Black and 'English' people.

== See also ==
- La Chapelle des Attakapas, a reproduction of the original church
