= Grand Lake (Louisiana) =

Lake in the United States of America

- Location within Louisiana Location within the United States
- Location: Cameron Parish, Louisiana
- Coordinates: 29°53′N 92°45′W
- Basin countries: United States
- Max. length: 10 mi (16 km)
- Max. width: 8 mi (13 km)
- Surface area: 42,100 acres (170 km^{2})
- Surface elevation: 12 ft (3.7 m)

Grand Lake is a freshwater lake located in Cameron Parish, Louisiana. The lake is not located in the community of Grand Lake, Louisiana.

== Location ==
According to the United States Army Corps of Engineers, Grand Lake is located in the extreme south-central part of the state about 12 miles (19 km) south of the town of Lake Arthur, Louisiana. It is a large circular lake approximately 42,100 acres (170 km^{2}) in size and is about 8.25 by 8.25 miles (13.28 by 13.28 km).

== Mermentau River ==
The Mermentau River flows through its western extremities therefore it is difficult to say whether the lake is an enlargement of the river or not. The lake is isolated from roads and highways and has no direct accesses. It has to be accessed from the Intracoastal Waterway that goes across its northern extremity, from points around the town of Lake Arthur to the north or from the town of Grand Chenier to the south. The Gulf of Mexico is easily accessed from this lake.
