= Traiteur (faith healer) =

Native Creole healer

In Louisiana, the term traiteur (sometimes spelled treateur) describes a man or woman (a traiteuse) who practices what is sometimes called faith healing. A traiteur is a Creole (or Cajun) healer or a traditional healer of the French-speaking Houma Tribe, whose primary method of treatment involves using the laying on of hands. An important part of Creole folk religion, the traiteur combines Catholic prayer and medicinal remedies. They are called to treat a variety of ailments, including: earaches, toothaches, warts, tumors, angina, and bleeding. In the past, they substituted for trained physicians in remote rural areas of Acadiana. Most traiteurs consider their healing abilities a gift from God.

Traiteurism is a very old tradition with a growing number of adherents, mostly due to it being passed down through generations. Traditionally, the rituals of the traiteur are passed down to the opposite gender. So a male must pass it down to a female, and vice versa. The traiteur must be asked to perform the treatments and will rarely offer them outright unless the need is great, and they can not ask for a payment of any kind, although it is acceptable to receive gifts for treating a person. However, gifts for a true traiteur are never required.

In Southern Louisiana, the co-existence of conventional medicine and traiteurs offers patients a range of resources for treating illness. Traiteurs and their patients do not view the two systems as conflicting. Lousay Aube, a retired Louisiana traiteur, says that prayers for healing are the main reason that traiteurs are sought. For example, if treating someone with a Coup-de-Soleil, or sunstroke, one would perform the ritual, then have the patient drink as much water as they could while lying down and then wiping the patient with a towel dampened in cool water. When a traiteur becomes ill, he goes to the doctor, yet he also employs week-long ceremonial candles (which are highly commercialized), Catholic Novenas (a Catholic rite involving nine days or weeks of recitation of a series of prayers), native traditional herbs, and perhaps a visit by another traiteur to get well. Some will use herbal remedies if they are known, the herbal remedies begin to cross over into voodoo being that both originated with the Creole people.

Switching from one healing system to another is common among these practitioners and their patients, whose religious syncretism is matched by syncretism among medical systems. Another example of this fluidity is evident in the language with which the patients label their illnesses. Lousay Aube, a healer, is shown at his weekly home "clinic" hours one Saturday treating patients. One woman describes her condition as la mal angle, Louisiana French for shingles, while another woman explains that she has herpes zoster, the medical term for the virus. Even in language, the traditional and the biomedical is heard to exist side by side without conflict. Katharine Poissot-Kinney, a practicing generational Creole traiteuse in Louisiana, also advises those seeking healing not to stop medical care until cleared by their physicians. Kinney uses a mixture of many spiritual practices that are common among traiteurs, including those from her Native American background in her healing practices and refuses payment of any kind.

The prayers of the traiteur that are passed down for generations through family members are kept secret to safeguard their potency. Kinney has one prayer in a native dialect that is untranslatable. The rituals involved with traiteurism are simple and time-honored, and they are careful to not transgress the teachings of the Catholic Church. While practitioners of this method of healing may use different ritual styles, treatment practices and prayers, there is always a spiritual component. Despite this, the methods of the traiteurs are purported to be able to work on a person regardless of faith or spirituality, should one be so moved as to ask for a treatment.

Traditionally, traitement (or treatment) consists of the laying of hands on and praying over the patient in-person; in fact, many traditionalists claim that the powers of the traiteur cannot cross bodies of water or, at the least, bodies of water between traiteur and patient may limit the effectiveness of the traitement. However, some traiteurs are willing to provide their services even if the person seeking treatment is not physically present: according to Becca Begnaud (a traiteur from Scott, Louisiana) and Erin Segura (an instructor at Louisiana State University with specific research interests in oral history and folklore, especially women in faith healing traditions), some traiteurs are willing to pray over their patients via the telephone, and Segura described once being treated via text message.

== See also ==
- Cajuns
- Louisiana Creole people
