= Maque choux =

Creole vegetable braise

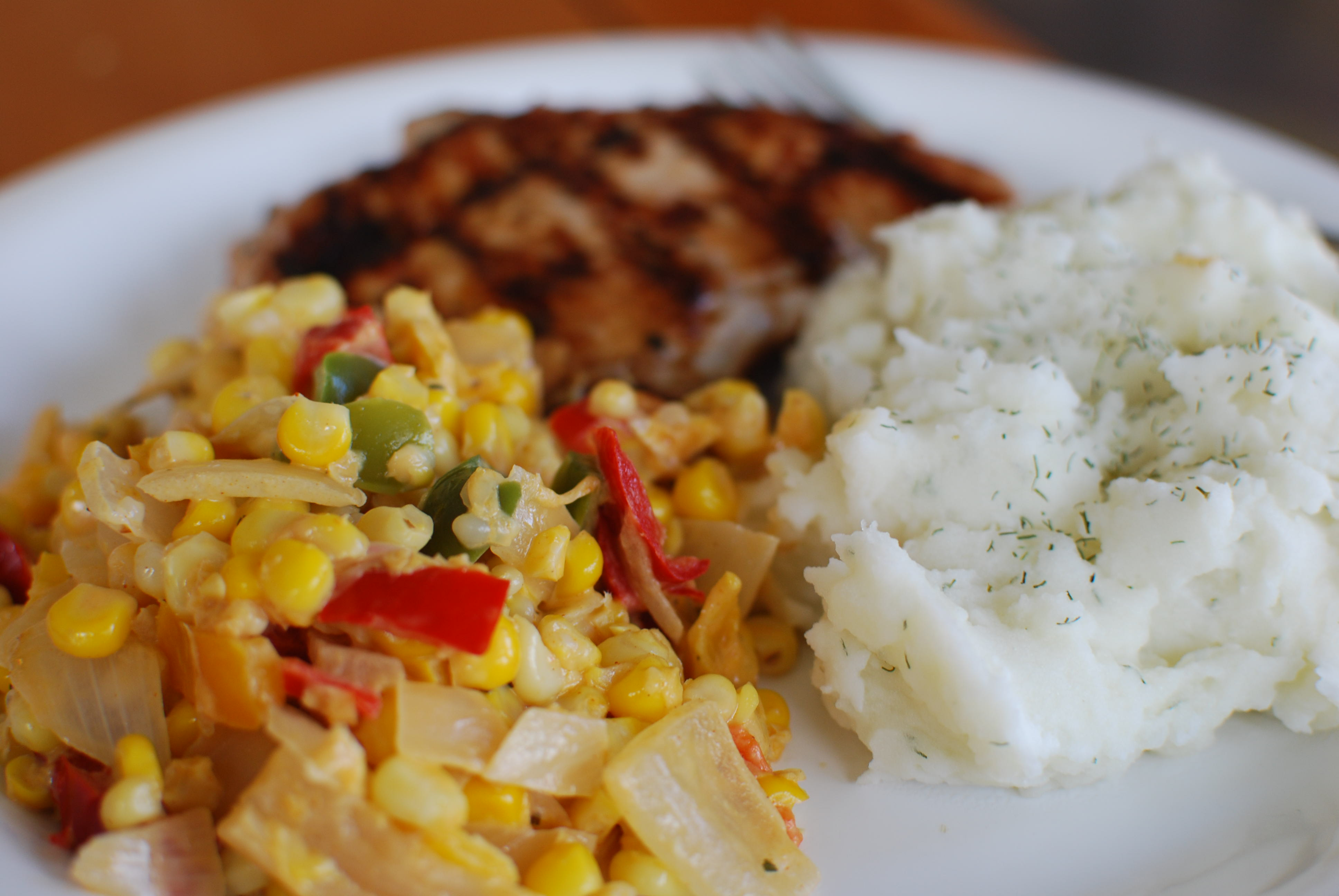
Maque choux (left) with dill mashed potatoes

Maque choux /ˈmɑːkʃuː/ is a traditional dish of Louisiana. It is thought to be an amalgam of Creole and Native American cultural influence, and the name is likely to derive from the French interpretation of the Native American name.

It contains corn, green bell pepper, onion, and sometimes garlic, celery, okra, and tomato. The ingredients are braised in a pot. Historically bacon grease was used for the braising stage, although various combinations of oil, butter, or cream may be substituted. The vegetables are then left to simmer until they reach a tender consistency, with chicken stock or water added as necessary. The dish is finished with salt and a combination of red and black pepper. Some cooks include hot sauce and a bit of sugar for greater complexity.

Maque choux is usually served as an accompaniment; however, it can also act as a base for a main meal and use local ingredients such as bite-sized portions of chicken or crawfish. Shrimp is often added in the later stages of cooking as well.
