= Sewee language =

Unclassified Indigenous language of the Americas

Sewee
- Native to: United States
- Region: South Carolina
- Ethnicity: Sewee
- Era: attested 1670
- Language family: unclassified (Siouan-Catawban?)

Language codes
- ISO 639-3: None (mis)
- Linguist List: 07z
- Glottolog: None

The Sewee language is a poorly attested and unclassified language once spoken by the Sewee, a historical Indigenous people of the Southeastern Woodlands from present-day South Carolina.

== Vocabulary ==
Some Sewee words were recorded in 1670 by Nicholas Carteret and William Owen.

- appada ‘friend’ (?) (recorded by Carteret)
- hiddie dod ‘a word of great kindness among them’ (recorded by Owen)
- hiddeskeh ‘sickly’ (recorded by Owen)
- Hiddy doddy Comorado Angles Westoe Skorrye ‘English very good friends, Westoes are nought’ (recorded by Carteret) (Comorado is a Spanish loanword, from camarada 'comrade')

Based on the geographical location of the Sewee people, Zamponi (2024) hypothesizes that the Sewee language may have been a Siouan-Catawban language, although he could not find any evidence of Siouan-Catawban morphemes in any attested Sewee words and phrases.
