= Bayou des Cannes =

Waterway in the Mermentau River basin of southern Louisiana

Coordinates: 30.548°N 92.537°W

Bayou des Cannes (pronounced "DAI KAIN", translated to "bayou of the reeds" or "bayou of the stalks") is a waterway in the Mermentau River basin of southern Louisiana. The bayou is 66 miles (106 km) long and is navigable near the shallow-draft port at the mouth.

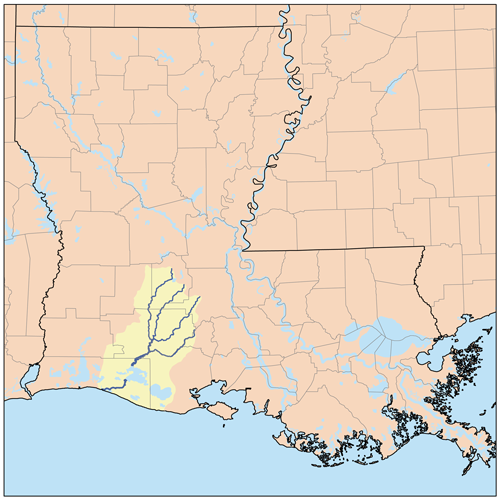
Map of the Mermentau River watershed showing the Mermantau River and its 4 largest tributaries (from left to right) Bayou Nezpique, Bayou des Cannes, Bayou Plaquemine Brule, and Bayou Queue de Tortue.

One of the first settlers of the area was Fabien and Louis Richard. The scenery of the area contained slow moving water, draped with moss-covered cypress trees and tupelo. The banks were veritable cascades of cypress knees. It was only navigable by pirogue or canoe. During the 18th century, few Acadians settled the rougher northwestern prairies. Four families (29 people) made their home between Bayou Des Cannes and Bayou Blaize LeJeune. This was the farthest west that Acadians would settle until in 1803, seven Opelousas Acadian families moved to Bayou Mallet, Bayou Jonas, Bayou Nezpique and Bayou des Cannes.

During the 1930s, the Point-Aux-Loups (point-ah-loo) (French for "Wolves Point") Springs Ballroom was originally built by the Louisiana Irrigation & Mills Company. This brick structure served as the main pumping plant which serviced southwest Louisiana farmers with irrigation to their rice crops. The building housed two large Fairbanks-Morse engines that pumped water at 60,000 US gallons per minute (230,000 L/min) out of Bayou des Cannes and into the flumes that carried water 0.25 miles (400 m) above ground into man-made canals throughout Acadia Parish.

== See also ==
- List of rivers in Louisiana
