= Akokisa =

Historic Indigenous tribe of Texas

Atakapa Ishak
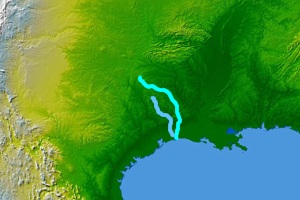
- Location of the Sabine River

Total population
- Ceased to exist as a tribe by the early 19th century

Regions with significant populations
- United States (Southeastern Texas)

Languages
- Akokisa (Atakapa?)

Religion
- Christianity, Indigenous religion

Related ethnic groups
- Atakapa, Bidai

The Akokisa (also known as the Accokesaws, Arkokisa, or Orcoquiza) were an Indigenous tribe who lived on Galveston Bay and the lower Trinity and Sabine rivers in Texas, primarily in the present-day Greater Houston area. They were a band of the Atakapa Indians, closely related to the Atakapa of Lake Charles, Louisiana.

== History ==
=== 16th century ===
Álvar Núñez Cabeza de Vaca wrote about the Akokisa in 1528, calling them the "Han".

=== 18th century ===
An early reported encounter with the Akokisa by a European person was in 1719 when Simars de Bellisle, a French officer, was held captive by the Akokisa until 1721. His account of his captivity provides some information about Akokisa culture.

John Sibley in 1805 reported that they previously lived near Matagorda Bay on the west bank of the Texan Colorado River in ancient times.

Around the 1750s the Akokisa were divided into five village groups. Some Akokisa people entered the San Ildefonso Mission in 1748–49 but left in 1755. That mission was abandoned and replaced by Nuestra Señora de la Luz Mission, built in 1756-57 on the Trinity River, to serve the Akokisa and Bidai tribes.

=== 19th century ===
In 1805, the Akokisa were reduced to two villages. One coastal village lay between the Sabine and Neches Rivers; the other was on the west side of the Colorado River. The Akokisas may have been absorbed into other tribes at the wake of the Texas Revolution of 1835–36.

== Name ==
The name Akokisa is of unknown origin, although John R. Swanton has speculated that the name may be from the Atakapa word icāk meaning "person". The Akokisa have also been known by the following names and spelling variations: Arkokisa, Caque, Han, Orcoquiza, Accocesaw, Accockesaw, Accokesaus, Accokesaw,

== Culture ==
Akokisa people lived in settled villages and built airy structures to cope with their warm climate. Their homes were beehive-shaped and thatched with grass or palmetto leaves. A hearth would be located in the center of the floor with a smokehole in the ceiling. During summer months, an Akokisa would sleep in a Chickee, a raised platform with a thatched roof and open sides. Beds were made of straw, covered with animal skins.

For water transportation and fishing, Akokisas carved cypress logs into dugout canoes.

Both men and women decorated their bodies and faces with tattoos.

The Akokisa, like the Atakapa, practiced cannibalism, which may have been connected to their religious beliefs. Cannibalistic efforts were described as consumption of enemies' flesh after a battle by Simars de Bellisle, who observed them firsthand. Akokisa were hunter-gatherers and had a diet of deer, fish, oysters and bison.

Black drink was used for purification in certain ceremonies.

They are reported to have grown "superfine" maize. Tubers of the greenbrier vine provided meal for baking and cooking. During warm seasons they ate bird eggs, fish, shellfish, and American lotus rhizomes and seeds; during cold seasons they moved further inland and hunted deer, bear, and bison. Horses were used to hunt bison. Tanned deer hides and bear fat were their primary commercial exports.

Almost nothing is known about their kinship systems, life cycle, or marriage customs.

== Language ==
Akokisa
- Native to: United States
- Region: Texas
- Ethnicity: Akokisa
- Extinct: 19th century
- Language family: Atakapan ?: Akokisa

Language codes
- ISO 639-3: None (mis)
- Glottolog: None

The Akokisa language is extinct and nearly unknown.

Swanton claimed that the Akokisa spoke a language related to Atakapa based on the similarity of a vocabulary of 45 words ascribed to the Akokisa collected by Captain Jean Béranger in 1721 on Galveston. However, there is no clear evidence that this document actually represents the language of Akokisa (Béranger provides a tribal designation for the vocabulary).

Sibley also reported that they had their own language "peculiar to themselves" and used sign language to communicate with other Indians (also reported for other peoples in eastern Texas). He did not connect them with the Atakapa.

Only two other Akokisa words have been found in Spanish records: Yegsa meaning "Spaniard(s)" and Quiselpoo, a female name.

== See also ==
- List of Native American peoples in the United States

== Bibliography ==
- Bolton, Herbert E. (1915). Texas in the middle eighteenth century: Studies in Spanish colonial history and administration. University of California publications in history (No. 3). Berkeley: University of California.
- Folmer, Henri. (1940). De Bellisle on the Texas coast. Southwestern Historical Quarterly, 44 (2), 204–231.
- Gatschet, Albert S.; & Swanton, John R. (1932). A Dictionary of the Atakapa language, accompanied by text material. Bureau of American Ethnology Bulletin (No. 108). Washington, D.C.: Smithsonian Institution.
- Goddard, Ives. (2005). The indigenous languages of the Southeast. Anthropological Linguistics, 47 (1), 1-60.
- Margry, Pierre (Ed.). (1879–1888). Découvertes et établissements des Français dans l'ouest et dans le sud de l'Amérique Septentrionale (1614–1754) (Vol. 6, pp. 320–347). Paris: Maison-neuve et Cie. (Reprinted 1974 by AMS Press).
- Martin, Jack. (2004). Languages. In R. D. Fogelson (Ed.), Handbook of North American Indians: Southeast (Vol. 14, pp. 68–86). Washington, D.C.: Smithsonian Institution.
- Newcomb, William W., Jr. (2004). Atakapans and neighboring groups. In R. D. Fogelson (Ed.), Handbook of North American Indians: Southeast (Vol. 14, pp. 659–663). Washington, D.C.: Smithsonian Institution.
- Sibley, John. (1806). Historical sketches of the several Indian tribes in Louisiana, south of the Arkansas River, and between the Mississippi and River Grand [5 April 1805]. In T. Jefferson (Ed.), Message from the President of the United States communicating the discoveries made in exploring the Missouri, Red River, and Washita (p. 48–62). New York: G. F. Hopkins.
- Swanton, John R. (1911). Indian tribes of the lower Mississippi valley and adjacent coast of the Gulf of Mexico. Bureau of American Ethnology Bulletin (No. 43). Washington, D.C.: Government Printing Office.
- Villiers du Terrage, Marc de; & Rivet, Paul. (1919). Les indiens du Texas et les expéditions françaises de 1720 et 1721 à la 'Baie Saint-Bernard'. Journal de la Société des Américanistes de Paris, 14, 127–149.
