= Bayou Plaquemine Brule =

Waterway in the Mermentau River basin of south Louisiana

Coordinates: 30.21615°N 92.57413°W

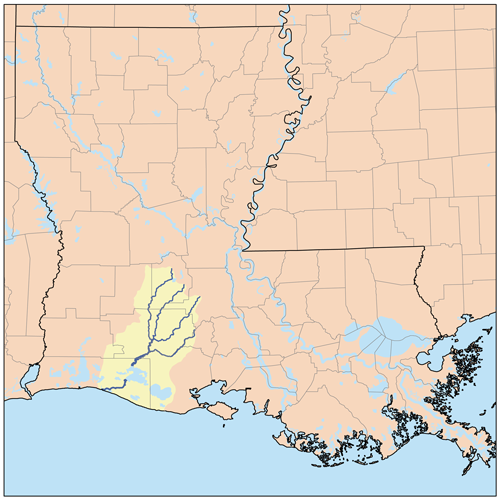
Map of the Mermentau River watershed showing the Mermantau River and its 4 largest tributaries (from left to right) Bayou Nezpique, Bayou des Cannes, Bayou Plaquemine Brule, and Bayou Queue de Tortue

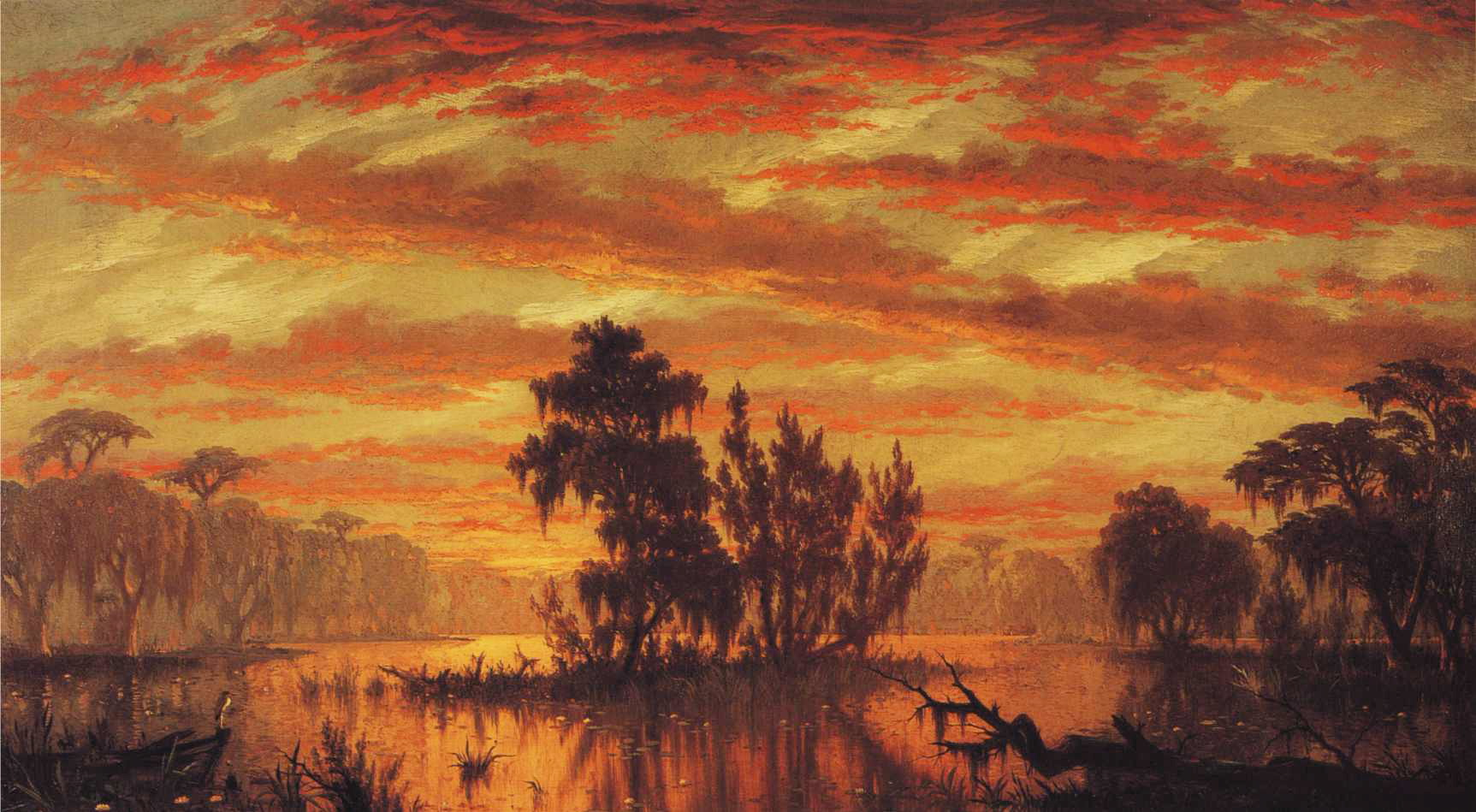
Bayou Plaquemines, 1881 painting by Joseph Rusling Meeker

Bayou Plaquemine Brulé (/ˈplækɪmɪn ˈbruːli/ PLAK-im-in BROO-lee; historically spelled Plakemine; translating to "burnt persimmon bayou") is a waterway in the Mermentau River basin of south Louisiana. The bayou is 58 miles (93 km) long and is navigable for 19 miles (31 km) of its lower course.

One of the first settlers of the area was Michel Comeau.

== See also ==
- List of rivers of Louisiana
