= Francois Simars de Bellisle =

French Shipwreck survivor (c. 1695-1763)

- Born: 1695
- Died: 1763 (aged 67–68)
- Occupation: Sailor

Francois Simars de Bellisle (c. 1695-1763) was a Frenchman who was shipwrecked on the Bolivar Peninsula, near present-day Galveston, Texas, in 1722. He had been sailing for New Orleans. He was captured by Akokisa natives, and had to subsist for some time on the land. His documentation of this ordeal is considered the first account of the Akokisa tribe.
