= Mermentau River =

River in southern Louisiana, United States

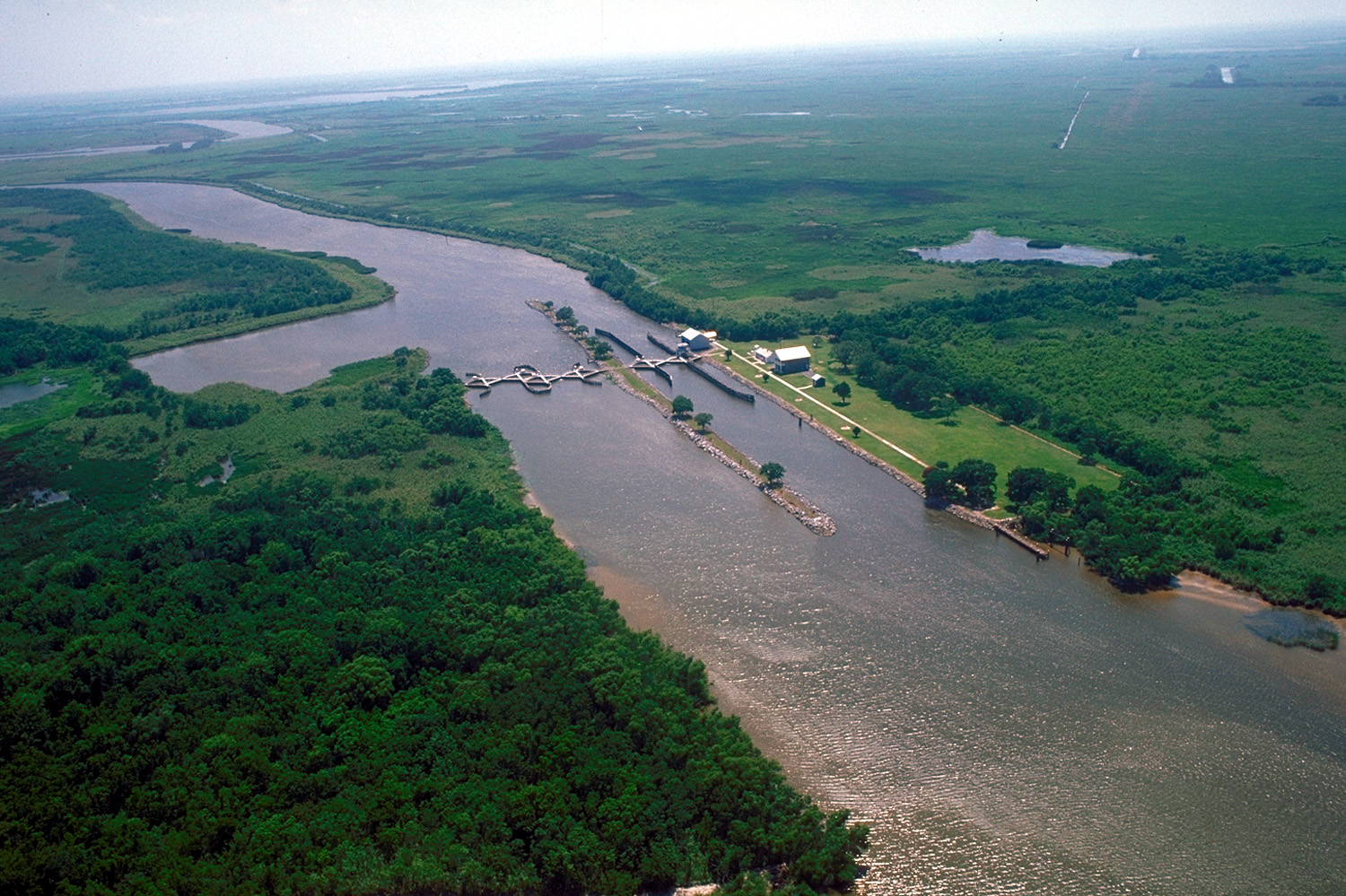
- Mermentau River at the Catfish Point Control Structure, where the river flows out of Grand Lake
- Mermentau River

Location
- Country: United States
- State: Louisiana
- Parishes: Acadia; Jefferson Davis; Vermilion; Cameron

Physical characteristics
- Source: Confluence of Bayou des Cannes and Bayou Plaquemine Brulee
  - location: Acadia Parish
  - coordinates: 30°12′58″N 92°34′26″W
- Mouth: Gulf of Mexico
  - location: Cameron Parish, between Calcasieu Pass and Vermilion Bay (Louisiana)
  - coordinates: 29°46′16″N 92°59′42″W
- Length: 112 km (70 mi)

The Mermentau River (French: Rivière Métave) is a 112-kilometer-long (70 mi) river in southern Louisiana in the United States. It enters the Gulf of Mexico between Calcasieu Lake and Vermilion Bay on the Chenier Coastal Plain.

The Mermentau River supplies freshwater for the Mermentau Basin. The Chenier Basin is located between the Mermentau Basin and the Gulf of Mexico, and is unique in that it no longer contains any true estuarine Gulf habitat, although historically the basin served as a productive estuarine nursery ground. Freshwater inflow is from the Catfish Point Control Structure. Presently, several large freshwater lakes (Grand Lake, White Lake) and confined wetlands dominate the region. These habitats are confined within the mainland and isolated from the influence of saltwater by a series of water control structures or locks.

A significant percentage of the basin lands are publicly owned as Federal refuges and State wildlife management areas. Pirate Jean Laffite is rumored to have sailed into the area during the 19th century, possibly stashing gold treasure.

== Landmarks ==
The Mermentau River contains the infamous "Negro Island" (also known as "Skull Island") situated near the tiny village of Grand Chenier in extreme southeastern Cameron Parish. In March 1867, John W. Sweeney, Jr., found "countless skulls, skeletons, and leg bones, each of the latter still shackled by a rusting leg iron to the skeleton lying beside it." Since the Civil War had recently ended, slave captains knew that if a slave ship were caught with Africans aboard, the slaver captain would be tried for violating the 1820 U.S. Law on Slave Trade, the penalty of which was a charge of piracy and death by hanging. Without a doubt the shackled and starving Africans on Skull Island died quickly. Researchers believe this human cargo could possibly be the missing slaves from the topsail hermaphrodite schooner Huntress. This schooner was the last slave ship which left the Congo region of Africa in March 1865 with a capacity of 200 slaves.
