= Indigenous peoples of the Southeastern Woodlands =

Indigenous groups in the US

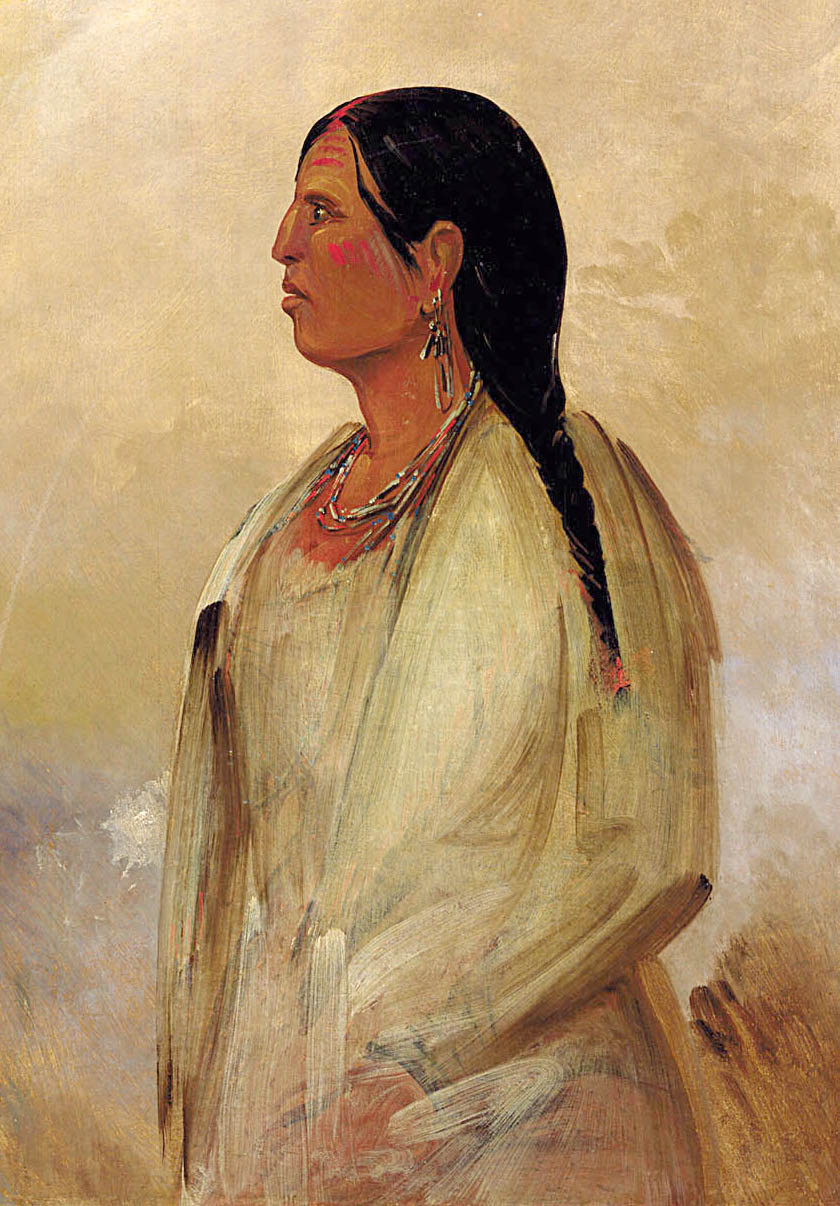
Painting of a Choctaw woman by George Catlin

Indigenous peoples of the Southeastern Woodlands, Southeastern cultures, or Southeast Indians are an ethnographic classification for Native Americans who have traditionally inhabited the area now part of the Southeastern United States and the northeastern border of Mexico, that share common cultural traits. This classification is a part of the Eastern Woodlands. The concept of a southeastern cultural region was developed by anthropologists, beginning with Otis Mason and Franz Boas in 1887. The boundaries of the region are defined more by shared cultural traits than by geographic distinctions. Because the cultures gradually instead of abruptly shift into Plains, Prairie, or Northeastern Woodlands cultures, scholars do not always agree on the exact limits of the Southeastern Woodland culture region. Shawnee, Powhatan, Waco, Tawakoni, Tonkawa, Karankawa, Quapaw, and Mosopelea are usually seen as marginally southeastern and their traditional lands represent the borders of the cultural region.

The area was linguistically diverse, major language groups were Caddoan and Muskogean, besides a number of language isolates.

== List of peoples ==
- Acolapissa (Colapissa), Louisiana and Mississippi
- Ais, eastern coastal Florida
- Alafay (Alafia, Pojoy, Pohoy, Costas Alafeyes, Alafaya Costas), Florida
- Amacano, Florida west coast
- Apalachee, northwestern Florida
- Atakapa (Attacapa), Louisiana west coast and Texas southeastern coast
  - Akokisa, Texas southeast coast
  - Bidai, Texas southeast coast
  - Deadose, eastern Texas
  - Eastern Atakapa, western coastal Louisiana
  - Orcoquiza, southeast Texas
- Patiri, eastern Texas
  - Tlacopsel, southeast Texas
- Avoyel ("little Natchez"), Louisiana
- Bayogoula, southeastern Louisiana
- Biloxi, Mississippi
- Chacato (Chatot, Chactoo), west Florida
- Caddo Confederacy, Arkansas, Louisiana, Oklahoma, Texas
  - Adai (Adaizan, Adaizi, Adaise, Adahi, Adaes, Adees, Atayos), Louisiana and Texas
  - Cahinnio, southern Arkansas
  - Doustioni, north central Louisiana
  - Eyeish (Hais), eastern Texas
  - Hainai, eastern Texas
  - Hasinai, eastern Texas
  - Kadohadacho, northeastern Texas, southwestern Arkansas, northwestern Louisiana
  - Nabedache, eastern Texas
  - Nabiti, eastern Texas
  - Nacogdoche, eastern Texas
  - Nacono, eastern Texas
  - Nadaco, eastern Texas
  - Nanatsoho, northeastern Texas
  - Nasoni, eastern Texas
  - Natchitoches, Lower: central Louisiana, Upper: northeastern Texas
  - Neche, eastern Texas
  - Nechaui, eastern Texas
  - Ouachita, northern Louisiana
  - Tula, western Arkansas
  - Yatasi, northwestern Louisiana
- Calusa, southwestern Florida
- Cape Fear Indians, North Carolina southern coast
- Catawba (Esaw, Usheree, Ushery, Yssa), North Carolina, South Carolina
- Chakchiuma, Alabama and Mississippi
- Chawasha (Washa), Louisiana
- Cheraw (Chara, Charàh), North Carolina
- Cherokee, western North Carolina, eastern Tennessee, later Georgia, northwestern South Carolina, northern Alabama, Arkansas, Texas, Mexico, and currently North Carolina and Oklahoma

- Chickamauga, eastern Tennessee

- Chickanee (Chiquini), North Carolina
- Chickasaw, Alabama and Mississippi, now Oklahoma
- Chicora, coastal South Carolina
- Chine, Florida
- Chisca (Cisca), southwestern Virginia (16th century), northern Florida (late 16th century – early 18th century)
- Chitimacha, Louisiana
- Choctaw, Mississippi, Alabama, and parts of Louisiana; later Oklahoma
- Chowanoc (Chowanoke), North Carolina
- Congaree (Canggaree), South Carolina
- Coree, North Carolina
- Croatan, North Carolina
- Cusabo coastal South Carolina
- Eno, North Carolina
- Escamacu, South Carolina
- Etiwan, South Carolina
- Grigra (Gris), Mississippi
- Guacata (Santa Luces), eastern coastal Florida See (Ais people)
- Guacozo, Florida
- Guale (Cusabo, Iguaja, Ybaja), coastal Georgia
- Guazoco, southwestern Florida coast
- Houma, Louisiana and Mississippi
- Jaega (Jobe), eastern coastal Florida
- Jaupin (Weapemoc), North Carolina
- Jororo, Florida interior
- Keyauwee, North Carolina
- Koasati (Coushatta), formerly eastern Tennessee, currently Louisiana, Oklahoma, and Texas
- Koroa, Mississippi
- Luca, southwestern Florida coast
- Lumbee, North Carolina
- Machapunga, North Carolina
- Matecumbe (Matacumbêses, Matacumbe, Matacombe), Florida Keys
- Mayaca, Florida
- Mayaimi (Mayami), interior Florida
- Mayajuaca, Florida (See Ais people)
- Mikasuki (Miccosukee), Florida
- Mobila (Mobile, Movila), northwestern Florida and southern Alabama
- Mocoso, western Florida
- Mougoulacha, Mississippi
- Muscogee, Tennessee, Georgia, Alabama, Mississippi, Florida, later Oklahoma
  - Abihka, Alabama, later Oklahoma
  - Alabama, formerly Alabama, southwestern Tennessee, and northwestern Mississippi, now Oklahoma and Texas
    - Pakana (Pacâni, Pagna, Pasquenan, Pak-ká-na, Pacanas), central Alabama, later Texas
  - Apalachicola Province, (Lower Towns of the Muscogee (Creek) Confederacy), Alabama and Georgia
    - Apalachicola (town), Alabama, Georgia and South Carolina
    - Coweta (town), Alabama and Georgia
    - Cusseta (town), Alabama and Georgia
    - Hitchiti (town), Alabama and Georgia
    - Oconee (town), Alabama and Georgia
    - Sabacola (town) (Sawakola, Sabacôla, Savacola, Sawokli), Alabama and Georgia
  - Chiaha, Creek Confederacy, Alabama
  - Eufaula tribe, Georgia, later Oklahoma
  - Kialegee Tribal Town, Alabama, later Oklahoma
  - Osochee (Osochi, Oswichee, Usachi, Oosécha), Creek Confederacy, Alabama
  - Tallapoosas, Creek Confederacy, Alabama
  - Thlopthlocco Tribal Town, Alabama, Georgia, later Oklahoma
  - Tukabatchee, Muscogee Creek Confederacy, Alabama
- Naniaba, northwestern Florida and southern Alabama
- Natchez, Louisiana and Mississippi later Oklahoma
- Neusiok (Newasiwac, Neuse River Indians), North Carolina
- Norwood culture, Apalachee region, Florida, c. 12,000 BCE — 4500 BCE
- Ofo (Mosopelea), Arkansas and Mississippi, eastern Tennessee
- Okchai (Ogchay), central Alabama
- Okelousa, Louisiana
- Opelousas, Louisiana
- Pacara people, Florida (See Amacano people)
- Pamlico, formerly North Carolina
- Pascagoula, Mississippi coast
- Pee Dee (Pedee), South Carolina and North Carolina
- Pensacola, Florida panhandle and southern Alabama
- Potoskeet, North Carolina
- Quinipissa, southeastern Louisiana and Mississippi
- Roanoke, North Carolina
- Saluda (Saludee, Saruti), South Carolina
- Santee (Seretee, Sarati, Sati, Sattees), South Carolina (no relation to Santee Sioux), South Carolina
- Santa Luces, Florida (See Ais people)
- Saponi, North Carolina, Virginia
- Saura, North Carolina
- Saxapahaw (Sissipahua, Shacioes), North Carolina
- Secotan, North Carolina
- Seminole, Florida and Oklahoma
- Sewee (Suye, Joye, Xoye, Soya), South Carolina coast
- Shakori, North Carolina
- Shoccoree (Haw), North Carolina, possibly Virginia
- Sissipahaw, North Carolina
- Sugeree (Sagarees, Sugaws, Sugar, Succa), North Carolina and South Carolina
- Surruque, east central Florida
- Suteree (Sitteree, Sutarees, Sataree), North Carolina
- Taensa, Mississippi
- Tawasa, Alabama
- Tequesta, southeastern coastal Florida
- Timucua, Florida and Georgia
  - Acuera, central Florida
  - Agua Fresca (or Agua Dulce or Freshwater), interior northeast Florida
  - Arapaha, north central Florida and south central Georgia?
  - Cascangue, coastal southeast Georgia
  - Icafui (or Icafi), coastal southeast Georgia
  - Mocama, coastal northeast Florida and coastal southeast Georgia
    - Saturiwa, northeast Florida
    - Tacatacuru, coastal southeast Georgia
  - Northern Utina north central Florida
  - Ocale, central Florida
  - Oconi, interior southeast Georgia
  - Potano, north central Florida
  - Tucururu (or Tucuru), central? Florida
  - Utina (or Eastern Utina), northeast central Florida
  - Yufera, coastal southeast Georgia
  - Yui (Ibi), coastal southeast Georgia
  - Yustaga, north central Florida
- Tiou (Tioux), Mississippi
- Tocaste, Florida
- Tocobaga, Florida
- Tohomé, northwestern Florida and southern Alabama
- Tomahitan, eastern Tennessee
- Topachula, Florida
- Tunica, Arkansas and Mississippi
- Utiza, Florida
- Uzita, Tampa Bay, Florida
- Vicela, Florida
- Viscaynos, Florida
- Waccamaw, South Carolina
- Wateree (Guatari, Watterees), North Carolina
- Waxhaw (Waxsaws, Wisack, Wisacky, Weesock, Flathead), North Carolina and South Carolina
- Westo, Virginia and South Carolina, extinct
- Winyah, South Carolina coast
- Woccon, North Carolina
- Yamasee, Florida, Georgia
- Yazoo, southeastern tip of Arkansas, eastern Louisiana, Mississippi
- Yuchi (Euchee), central Tennessee, then northwest Georgia, now Oklahoma

== Federally recognized tribes ==
1. Alabama-Coushatta Tribes of Texas
2. Alabama-Quassarte Tribal Town, Oklahoma
3. Caddo Nation of Oklahoma
4. Catawba Indian Nation, South Carolina
5. Cherokee Nation, Oklahoma
6. Chickasaw Nation, Oklahoma
7. Chitimacha Tribe of Louisiana
8. Choctaw Nation of Oklahoma
9. Coushatta Tribe of Louisiana
10. Eastern Band of Cherokee Indians of North Carolina
11. Jena Band of Choctaw Indians, Louisiana
12. Kialegee Tribal Town, Oklahoma
13. Miccosukee Tribe of Indians of Florida
14. Mississippi Band of Choctaw Indians, Mississippi
15. Muscogee (Creek) Nation, Oklahoma
16. Poarch Band of Creek Indians of Alabama
17. Seminole Tribe of Florida
18. Seminole Nation of Oklahoma
19. Thlopthlocco Tribal Town, Oklahoma
20. Tunica-Biloxi Indian Tribe of Louisiana
21. United Keetoowah Band of Cherokee Indians in Oklahoma

== History ==
The following section deals primarily with the history of the peoples in the lengthy period before European contact. Evidence of the preceding cultures have been found primarily in archeological artifacts, but also in major earthworks and the evidence of linguistics. In the Late Prehistoric time period in the Southeastern Woodlands, cultures increased agricultural production, developed ranked societies, increased their populations, trade networks, and intertribal warfare. Most Southeastern peoples (excepting some of the coastal peoples) were highly agricultural, growing crops like maize, squash, and beans for food. They supplemented their diet with hunting, fishing, and gathering wild plants and fungi.

Belonging in the Lithic stage, the oldest known art in the Americas is the Vero Beach bone found in present-day Florida. It is possibly a mammoth bone, etched with a profile of walking mammoth; it dates to 11,000 BCE.

=== Poverty Point culture ===
The Poverty Point culture inhabited portions of the state of Louisiana from 2000–1000 BCE during the Archaic period. Many objects excavated at Poverty Point sites were made of materials that originated in distant places, indicating that the people were part of an extensive trading culture. Such items include chipped stone projectile points and tools; ground stone plummets, gorgets and vessels; and shell and stone beads. Stone tools found at Poverty Point were made from raw materials that can be traced to the relatively nearby Ouachita and Ozark mountains, as well as others from the more distant Ohio and Tennessee River valleys. Vessels were made from soapstone which came from the Appalachian foothills of Alabama and Georgia. Hand-modeled lowly fired clay objects occur in a variety of shapes including anthropomorphic figurines and cooking balls.

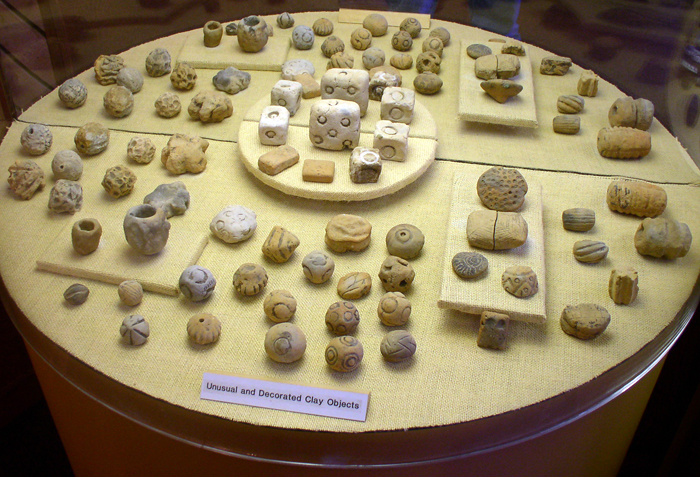
"Poverty point objects," earthenware, believed to be for cooking, Poverty Point

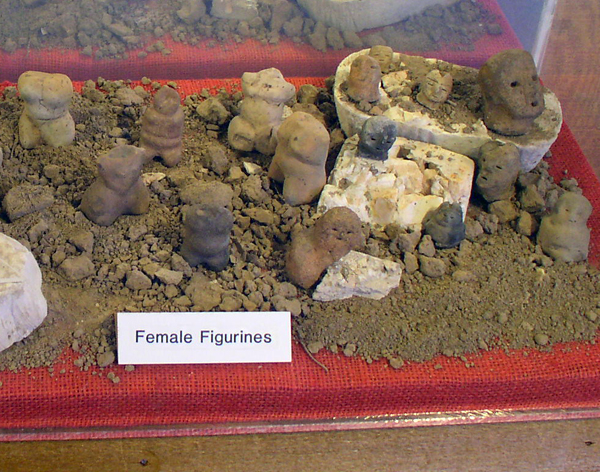
Clay female figurines, Poverty Point

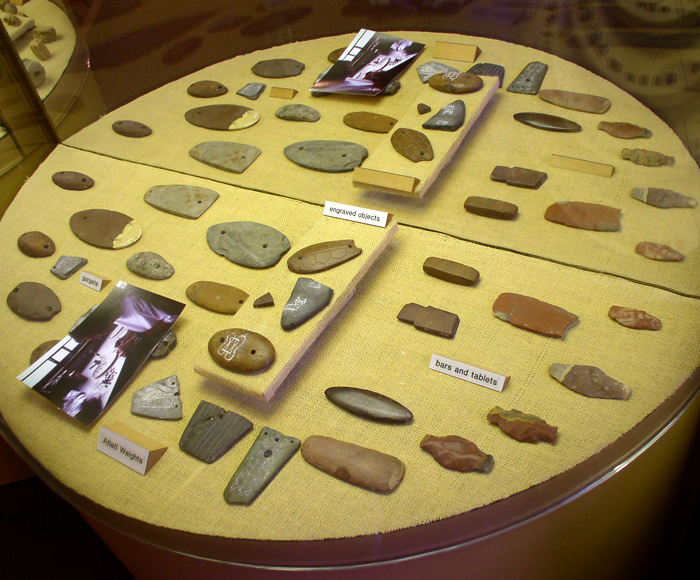
Carved shell gorgets and atlatl weights, Poverty Point

=== Mississippian culture ===
Mississippian cultures flourished in what is now the Midwestern, Eastern, and Southeastern United States from approximately 800 CE to 1500 CE, varying regionally. After adopting maize agriculture the Mississippian culture became fully agrarian, as opposed to the preceding Woodland cultures that supplemented hunting and gathering with limited horticulture. Mississippian peoples often built platform mounds. They refined their ceramic techniques and often used ground mussel shell as a tempering agent. Many were involved with the Southeastern Ceremonial Complex, a multi-regional and multi-linguistic religious and trade network that marked the southeastern part of the Mississippian Ideological Interaction Sphere. Information about Southeastern Ceremonial Complex primary comes from archaeology and the study of the elaborate artworks left behind by its participants, including elaborate pottery, conch shell gorgets and cups, stone statuary, and Long-nosed god maskettes. The Calusa peoples, of southern Florida, carved and painted wood in exquisite depictions of animals.

By the time of European contact the Mississippian societies were already experiencing severe social stress. Some major centers had already been abandoned. With social upsets and diseases unknowingly introduced by Europeans many of the societies collapsed and ceased to practice a Mississippian lifestyle, with an exception being the Natchez people of Mississippi and Louisiana. Other tribes descended from Mississippian cultures include the Alabama, Biloxi, Caddo, Choctaw, Muscogee Creek, Tunica, and many other southeastern peoples.

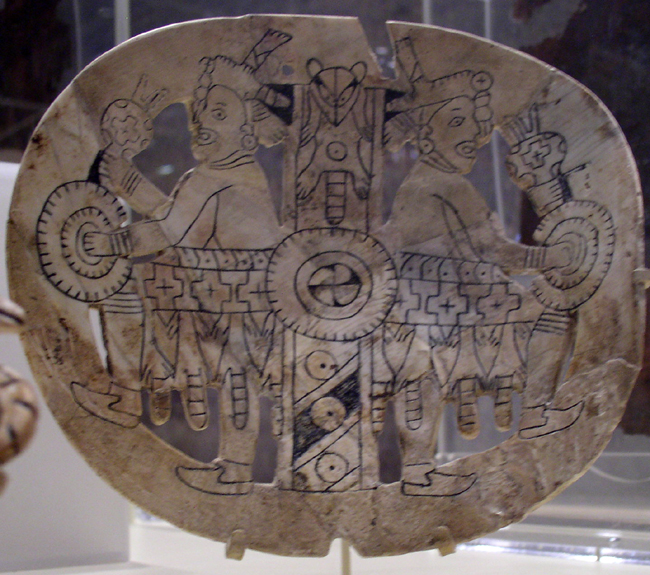
Engraved shell gorget, Spiro Mounds, Oklahoma (Mississippian culture)

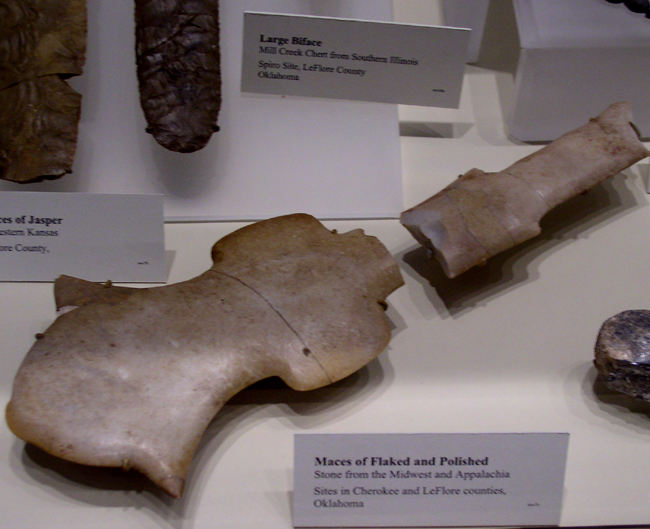
Ceremonial stone mace, Spiro Mounds, Oklahoma (Mississippian culture)

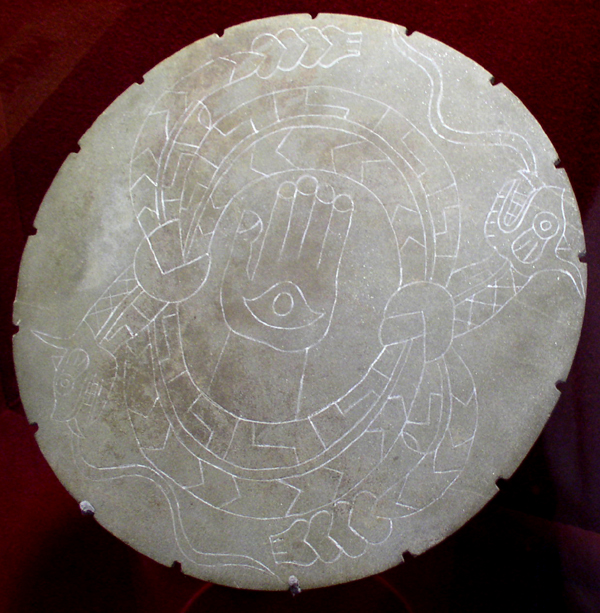
Engraved stone palette, Moundville, Alabama, back used for mixing paint (Mississippian culture)

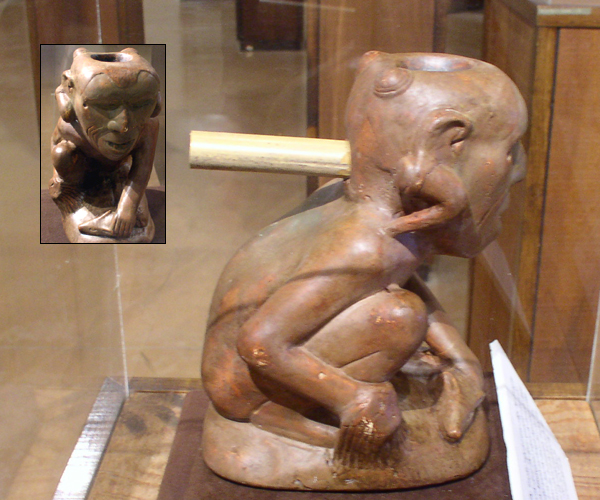
Stone effigy pipe, Spiro Mounds (Mississippian culture)

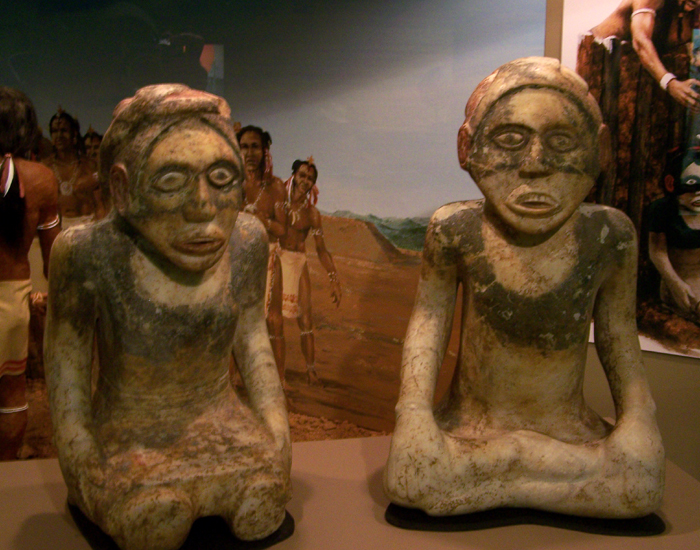
Stone effigies, Etowah site, Georgia (Mississippian culture)

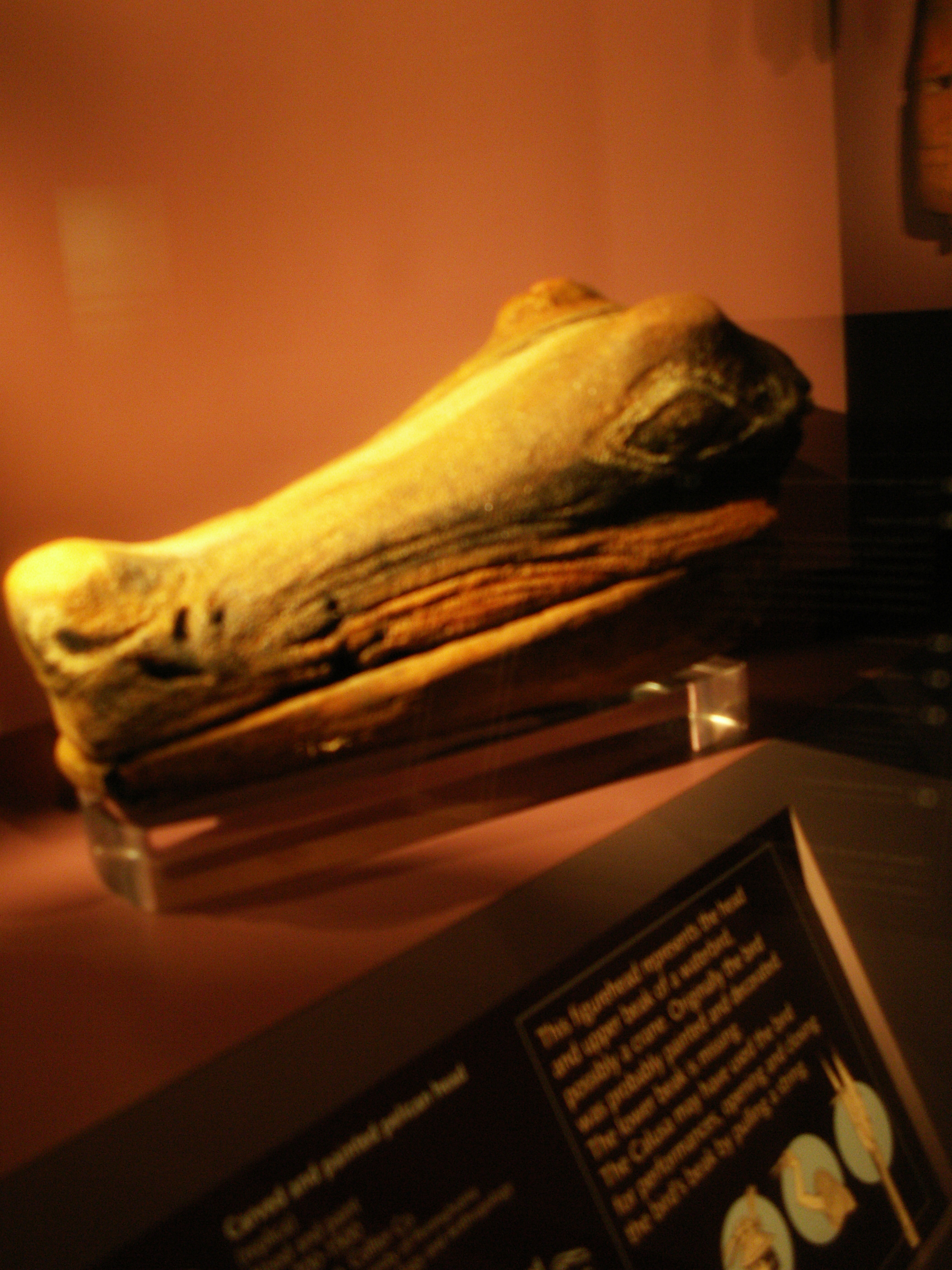
Alligator effigy, wood carving, Calusa, Florida

=== Post-European contact ===
During the Indian Removal era of the 1830s, most southeastern tribes were forcibly relocated to Indian Territory west of the Mississippi River by the US federal government, as European-American settlers pushed the government to acquire their lands. Some members of the tribes chose to stay in their homelands and accept state and US citizenship; others simply hid in the mountains or swamps and sought to maintain some cultural continuity. Since the late 20th century, descendants of these people have organized as tribes; in a limited number of cases, some have achieved federal recognition but more have gained state recognition through legislation at the state level.

== Culture ==
A sacred religious symbol to the Southeastern peoples was the solar cross which was a symbol of both the sun and fire. It had several variations, the one shown is from the Caddo from East Texas.

Frank Speck identified several key cultural traits of Southeastern Woodlands peoples. Social traits included having a matrilineal kinship system, exogamous marriage between clans, and organizing into settled villages and towns. Southeastern Woodlands societies were usually divided into clans; the most common from pre-contact Hopewellian times into the present include Bear, Beaver, Bird other than a raptor, Canine (e.g. Wolf), Elk, Feline (e.g. Panther), Fox, Raccoon, and Raptor. They observe strict incest taboos, including taboos against marriage within a clan. In the past, they frequently allowed polygamy to chiefs and other men who could support multiple wives. They held puberty rites for both boys and girls.

Southeastern peoples also traditionally shared similar religious beliefs, based on animism. They used fish poison, and practiced purification ceremonies among their religious rituals, as well as the Green Corn Ceremony. Medicine people are important spiritual healers.

Many southeastern peoples engaged in mound building to create sacred or acknowledged ritual sites. Many of the religious beliefs of the Southeastern Ceremonial Complex or the Southern Cult, were also shared by the Northeastern Woodlands tribes, probably spread through the dominance of the Mississippian culture in the 10th century.

The main agricultural crops of the region were the Three Sisters: winter squash, maize (corn), and climbing beans (usually tepary beans or common beans). Originating in Mesoamerica, these three crops were carried northward over centuries to many parts of North America. The three crops were normally planted together using a technique known as companion planting on flat-topped mounds of soil. The three crops were planted in this way as each benefits from the proximity of the others. The tall maize plants provide a structure for the beans to climb, while the beans provide nitrogen to the soil that benefits the other plants. Meanwhile, the squash spreads along the ground, blocking the sunlight to prevent weeds from growing and retaining moisture in the soil.

== See also ==
- Classification of Indigenous peoples of the Americas
- Indigenous people of the Everglades region
- Northeastern Woodlands tribes
- Stomp dance
- Trail of Tears
