= Demographics of Arkansas =

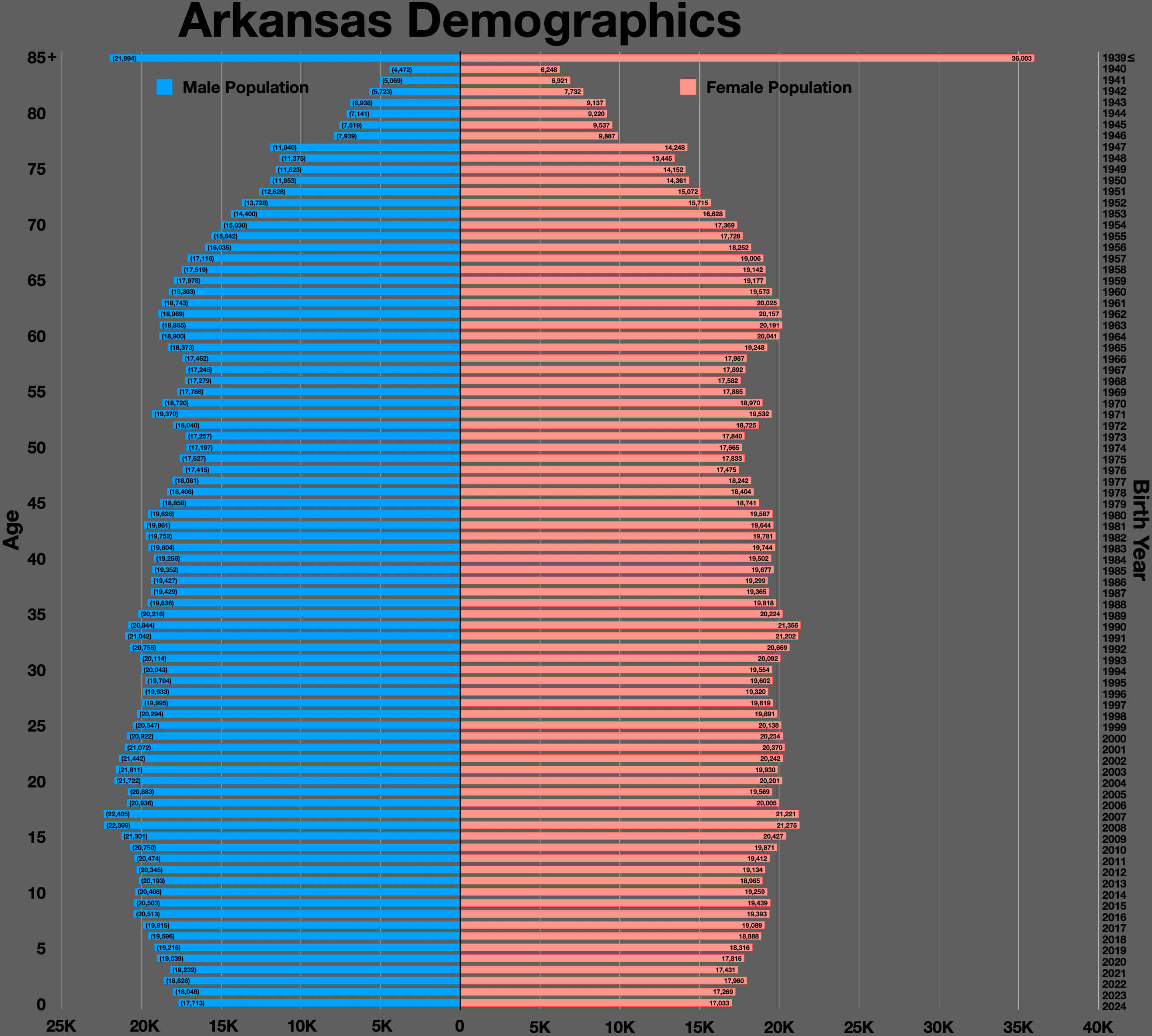
Arkansas population pyramid

Arkansas is the 32nd largest U.S. state, with a population of 3,011,524 as of the 2020 United States census.

== Demographics ==
Historical population
Census	Pop.	Note	%±
1810	1,062		—
1820	14,273		1,244.0%
1830	30,388		112.9%
1840	97,574		221.1%
1850	209,897		115.1%
1860	435,450		107.5%
1870	484,471		11.3%
1880	802,525		65.6%
1890	1,128,211		40.6%
1900	1,311,564		16.3%
1910	1,574,449		20.0%
1920	1,752,204		11.3%
1930	1,854,482		5.8%
1940	1,949,387		5.1%
1950	1,909,511		−2.0%
1960	1,786,272		−6.5%
1970	1,923,295		7.7%
1980	2,286,435		18.9%
1990	2,350,725		2.8%
2000	2,673,400		13.7%
2010	2,915,918		9.1%
2020	3,011,524		3.3%
2025 (est.)	3,114,791		3.4%
Source: 1910–2020, 2025

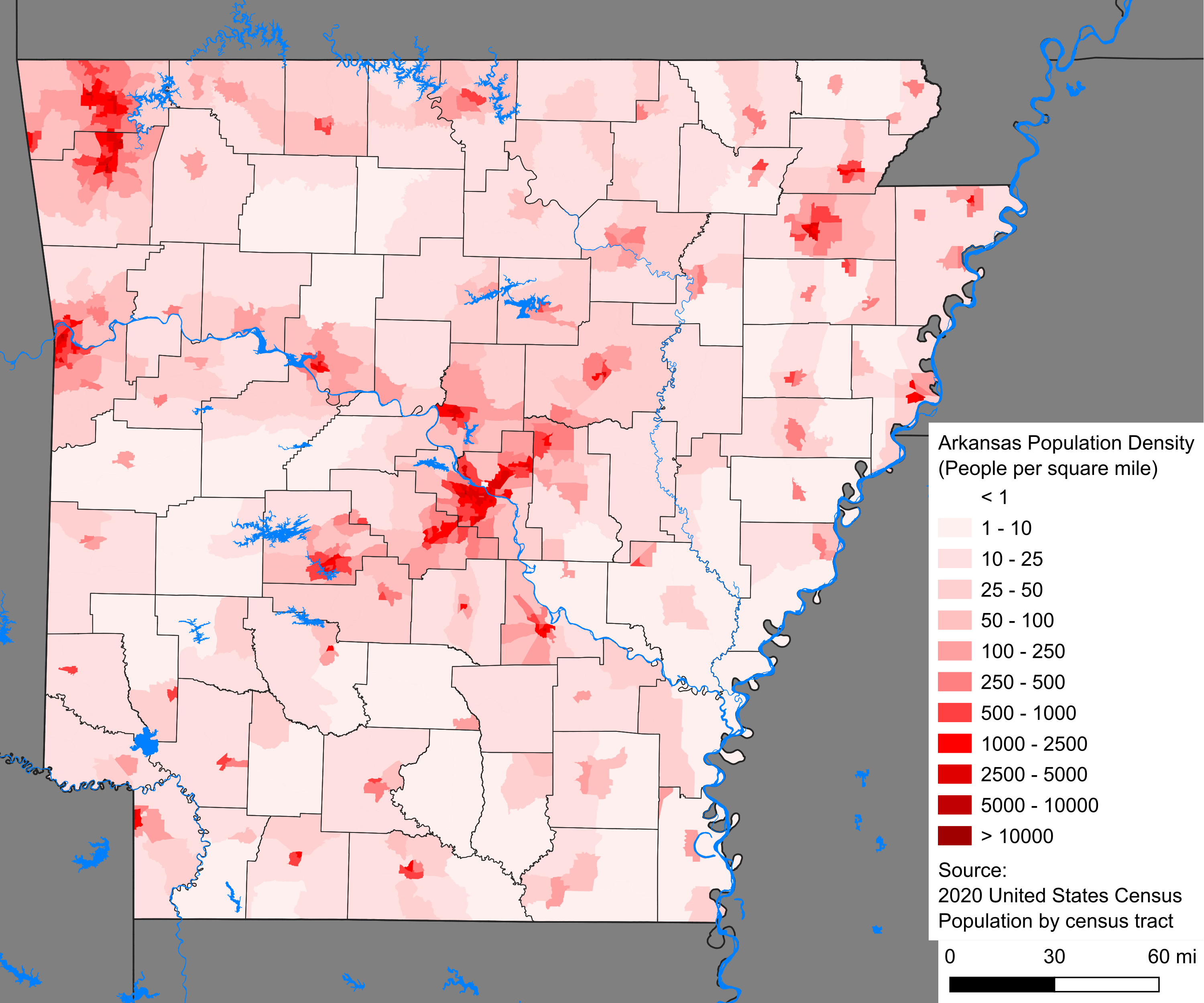
Arkansas population density map as of 2020

The United States Census Bureau estimates that the population of Arkansas was 3,045,637 on July 1, 2022, a 1.13% increase since the 2020 United States Census

As of 2022, Arkansas had an estimated population of 3,045,637, which is an increase of 11,835, or 0.2%, from the prior year and an increase of 62,286, or 2.14%, since the year 2010. This includes a natural increase since the last census of 52,214 people (that is 198,800 births minus 146,586 deaths) and an increase due to net migration of 57,611 people into the state. Immigration from outside the United States resulted in a net increase of 21,947 people, and migration within the country produced a net increase of 35,664 people. It is estimated that about 48.8% is male, and 51.2% is female. From 2000 through 2006 Arkansas has had a population growth of 5.1% or 137,472. The population density of the state is 51.3 people per square mile.

According to the 2020 United States Census, Arkansas had a population of 3,011,524. The racial composition of the population was:

- 70.2% White American
- 15.1% Black or African American
- 0.9% Native Americans and Alaska Natives
- 1.7% Asian American
- 0.5% Native Hawaiian and Other Pacific Islander
- 4.5% from some other race
- 7.1% from two or more races

8.5% of the population was Hispanic or Latino of any race.

Demographics of Arkansas – Racial and ethnic composition Note: the US Census treats Hispanic/Latino as an ethnic category. This table excludes Latinos from the racial categories and assigns them to a separate category. Hispanics/Latinos may be of any race.
Race / Ethnicity (NH = Non-Hispanic)	Pop 2000	Pop 2010	Pop 2020	% 2000	% 2010	% 2020
White alone (NH)	2,100,135	2,173,469	2,063,550	78.56%	74.54%	68.52%
Black or African American alone (NH)	416,615	447,102	449,884	15.58%	15.33%	14.94%
Native American or Alaska Native alone (NH)	16,702	20,183	20,549	0.62%	0.69%	0.68%
Asian alone (NH)	19,892	35,647	51,210	0.74%	1.22%	1.70%
Pacific Islander alone (NH)	1,494	5,509	14,280	0.06%	0.19%	0.47%
Other race alone (NH)	1,332	2,121	8,047	0.05%	0.07%	0.27%
Mixed race or Multiracial (NH)	30,364	45,837	147,157	1.14%	1.57%	4.89%
Hispanic or Latino (any race)	86,866	186,050	256,847	3.25%	6.38%	8.53%
Total	2,673,400	2,915,918	3,011,524	100.00%	100.00%	100.00%

==== 2025 American Community Survey one-year estimates ====
Racial Makeup of Arkansas (2025): 1. White alone (68.2%); 2. Black alone (14.7%); 3. Native American alone (0.93%); 4. Asian Alone (2.01%); 5. Pacific Islander Alone (0.38%); 6. Other race alone (3.53%); 7. Two or more races (10.3%)	Racial/Ethnic Makeup of Arkansas excluding Hispanics from racial categories (2025); NH=Non-Hispanic: 1. White NH (66.1%); 2. Black NH (14.5%); 3. Native American NH (0.73%); 4. Asian NH (1.99%); 5. Pacific Islander NH (0.38%); 6. Other race NH (0.28%); 7. Two or more races NH (6.31%); 8. Hispanic Any Race (9.75%)	Racial Makeup of Hispanics in Arkansas (2025): 1. White alone (21.8%); 2. Black alone (2.04%); 3. Native American alone (1.99%); 4. Asian Alone (0.19%); 5. Pacific Islander Alone (0.00%); 6. Other race alone (33.3%); 7. Two or more races (40.6%)

According to the 2006–2008 American Community Survey, the ten largest ancestry groups in the state African American (15.5%), Irish (13.6%), German (12.5%), American (11.1%), English (10.3%), French (2.4%), Scotch-Irish (2.1%), Dutch (1.9%), Scottish (1.9%) and Italian (1.7%).

Before the arrival of Europeans, Native American tribes such as Caddo, Quapaw, and Osage Nations inhabited the state. Cherokee people have a history in the state after voluntary and forced removals in the 1810s to 1830s, the Cherokee Nation is located in neighboring Oklahoma (its Northeastern side facing the Arkansas state line) and both citizens and descendants reside in Benton, Washington and Crawford counties. European Americans have a strong presence in the northwestern Ozarks and the central part of the state. African Americans live mainly in the southern and eastern parts of the state. Arkansans of Irish, English and German ancestry are mostly found in the far northwestern Ozarks near the Missouri border. Ancestors of the Irish in the Ozarks were chiefly Scotch-Irish, Protestants from Northern Ireland, the Scottish lowlands and northern England: part of the largest group of settlers from Great Britain and Ireland before the American Revolution. English and Scotch-Irish immigrants settled throughout the backcountry of the South and in the more mountainous areas. Americans of English ancestry are found throughout the state. Greeks settled in Little Rock, Greek communities also grew up in Fort Smith, Pine Bluff, Hot Springs, and other parts of Arkansas. There is also an Italian community in Arkansas. There is small community of Roma in Arkansas. Romanichal are present in state. Arkansas also has a growing Hispanic population. Many of the Hispanics in Arkansas are of Mexican descent. Asians are present in the state. There is a Chinese, Indian and Hmong presence in Arkansas.

== Vital statistics ==
Year	Population	Live births	Deaths	Natural change	Crude birth rate (per 1,000)	Crude death rate (per 1,000)	Natural change (per 1,000)	Crude migration change (per 1,000)
2000	2,678,588	37,783	28,217	9,566	14.1	10.5	3.6	
2001	2,691,571	37,010	27,759	9,251	13.8	10.3	3.5	1.4
2002	2,705,927	37,437	28,513	8,924	13.8	10.5	3.3	2.0
2003	2,724,816	37,784	27,918	9,866	13.9	10.2	3.7	3.3
2004	2,749,686	38,573	27,528	11,045	14.0	10.0	4.0	5.0
2005	2,781,097	39,208	28,055	11,153	14.1	10.1	4.0	7.3
2006	2,821,761	40,961	27,901	13,060	14.5	9.9	4.6	9.8
2007	2,848,650	41,378	28,191	13,187	14.5	9.9	4.6	4.8
2008	2,874,554	40,669	29,322	11,347	14.1	10.2	3.9	5.1
2009	2,896,843	39,808	28,673	11,135	13.7	9.9	3.8	3.9
2010	2,921,546	38,540	28,916	9,624	13.2	9.9	3.3	5.2
2011	2,938,773	38,715	29,653	9,062	13.2	10.1	3.1	2.8
2012	2,948,793	38,347	30,117	8,230	13.0	10.2	2.8	0.6
2013	2,954,563	37,832	30,437	7,395	12.8	10.3	2.5	-0.5
2014	2,961,050	38,511	30,467	8,044	13.0	10.3	2.7	-0.5
2015	2,970,210	38,886	31,617	7,269	13.1	10.6	2.5	0.6
2016	2,980,475	38,274	31,756	6,518	12.8	10.7	2.1	1.3
2017	2,990,702	37,520	32,588	4,932	12.5	10.9	1.6	1.8
2018	2,997,195	37,018	32,336	4,682	12.4	10.8	1.6	0.6
2019	3,004,206	36,564	32,888	3,676	12.2	10.9	1.3	1.1
2020	3,014,399	35,251	38,108	-2,857	11.7	12.6	-0.9	4.3
2021	3,027,127	35,965	40,070	-4,105	11.9	13.2	-1.3	5.6
2022	3,047,429	35,471	37,855	-2,384	11.6	12.4	-0.8	7.4
2023	3,069,856	35,264	35,758	-494	11.5	11.6	-0.1	7.5
2024	3,096,080	35,395	35,976	-581	11.4	11.6	-0.2	8.7
2025	3,114,791	35,545	36,085	-540	11.4	11.6	-0.2	6.2

== Native American tribes ==
There are no federally recognised Native American tribes in Arkansas. In the past, the territory that is now Arkansas was inhabited by the Caddo, Cahinnio, Casqui, Cherokee, Mitchigamea (who summered in Arkansas and wintered in modern Illinois), Nasoni, Pacaha, Quapaw/Arkansas, Tula, and Tunica. The surviving of these peoples now live in Oklahoma.

== Languages ==
Before Native Americans were devastated in Arkansas, Indigenous languages such as Quapaw, Caddo, Osage, and Tunica were spoken there. Spanish is the most widely spoken non-English language in the state. After Spanish, the most common languages are Ilocano, Samoan, Hawaiian, and other Austronesian languages, followed by Vietnamese, Tagalog, and Chinese.

== Ancestry ==
=== Births data ===
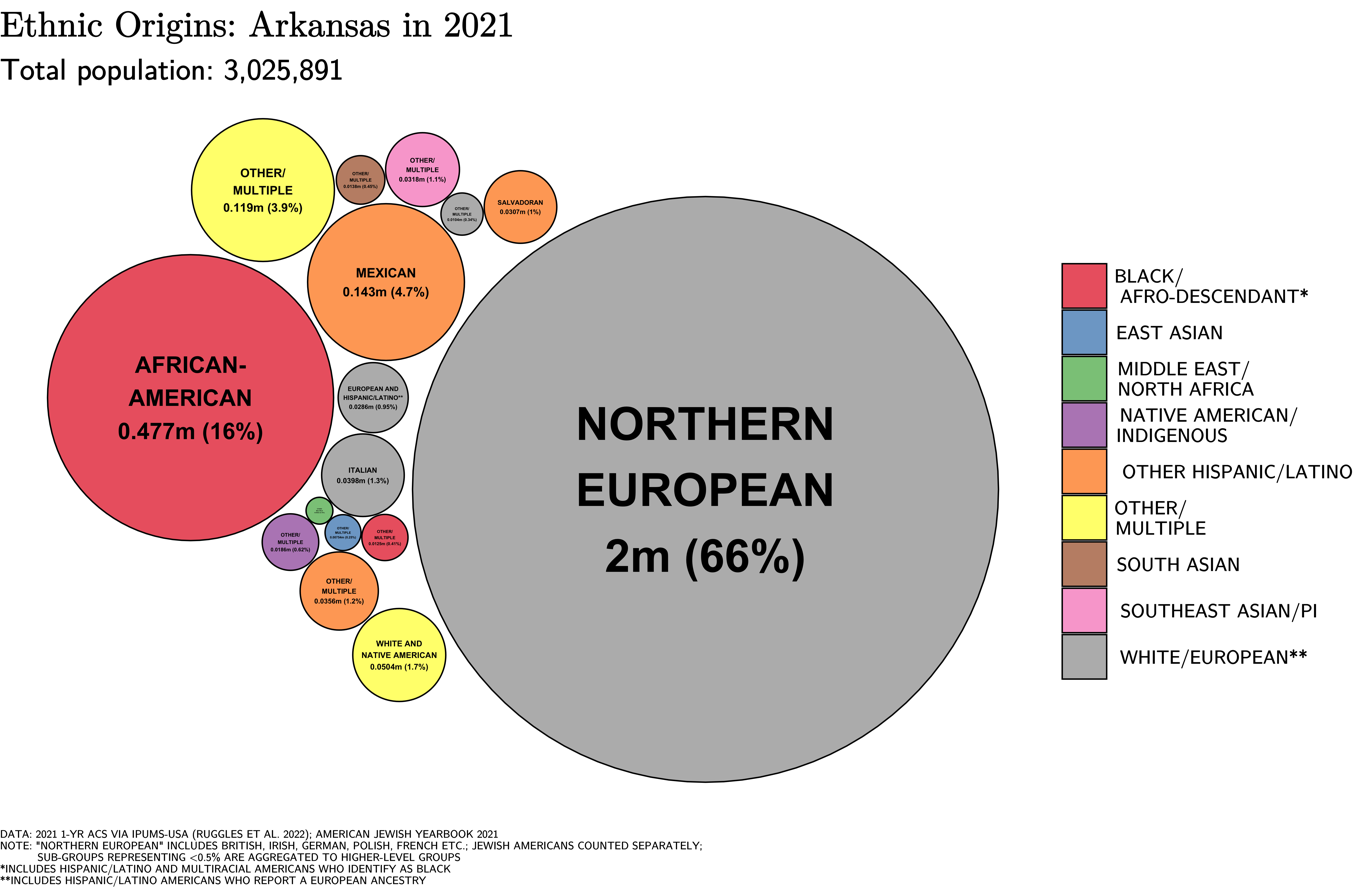
Ethnic origins in Arkansas

Note: Births in table don't add up, because Hispanics are counted both by their ethnicity and by their race, giving a higher overall number.

Live Births by Single Race/Ethnicity of Mother
Race	2014	2015	2016	2017	2018	2019	2020	2021	2022	2023	2024
White	25,940 (67.4%)	25,714 (66.1%)	24,953 (65.2%)	24,089 (64.2%)	23,609 (63.8%)	23,065 (63.1%)	22,106 (62.7%)	22,862 (63.6%)	22,539 (63.5%)	22,163 (62.8%)	22,511 (63.6%)
Black	7,376 (19.1%)	7,767 (20.0%)	7,098 (18.5%)	7,082 (18.9%)	6,966 (18.8%)	6,998 (19.1%)	6,834 (19.4%)	6,661 (18.5%)	6,301 (17.8%)	6,379 (18.1%)	5,725 (16.2%)
Asian	1,202 (3.1%)	1,234 (3.2%)	805 (2.1%)	783 (2.1%)	775 (2.1%)	772 (2.0%)	825 (2.3%)	815 (2.3%)	777 (2.2%)	813 (2.3%)	877 (2.5%)
Pacific Islander	...	...	420 (1.1%)	470 (1.3%)	498 (1.3%)	539 (1.5%)	449 (1.3%)	522 (1.4%)	545 (1.5%)	534 (1.5%)	521 (1.5%)
American Indian	301 (0.8%)	353 (0.9%)	233 (0.6%)	239 (0.6%)	220 (0.6%)	191 (0.5%)	183 (0.5%)	217 (0.6%)	194 (0.5%)	205 (0.6%)	183 (0.5%)
Hispanic (any race)	3,837 (10.0%)	4,008 (10.3%)	4,064 (10.6%)	4,048 (10.8%)	4,099 (11.1%)	4,088 (11.2%)	3,939 (11.2%)	4,069 (11.3%)	4,227 (11.9%)	4,305 (12.2%)	4,664 (13.2%)
Total	38,511 (100%)	38,886 (100%)	38,274 (100%)	37,520 (100%)	37,018 (100%)	36,564 (100%)	35,251 (100%)	35,965 (100%)	35,471 (100%)	35,264 (100%)	35,395 (100%)

- Since 2016, data for births of White Hispanic origin are not collected, but included in one Hispanic group; persons of Hispanic origin may be of any race.

According to the 2006–2008 American Community Survey, 93.8% of Arkansas's population (over the age of five) spoke only English at home. About 4.5% of the state's population spoke Spanish at home. About 0.7% of the state's population spoke any other Indo-European language. About 0.8% of the state's population spoke an Asian language, and 0.2% spoke other languages.

In 2006, Arkansas has a larger percentage of tobacco smokers than the national average, with 24.0% of adults smoking.

=== Religion ===
Arkansas, like most other Southern states, is part of the Bible Belt and is predominantly Protestant. The religious affiliations of the people as of 2001 are as follows:

- Christian: 86.0%
  - Protestant: 78.0%
    - Baptist: 39.0%
    - Methodist: 9.0%
    - Pentecostal: 6.0%
    - Church of Christ: 6.0%
    - Assemblies of God: 3.0%
    - Other Protestant: 15.0%
  - Roman Catholic: 7.0%
  - Eastern Orthodox: <1.0%
  - Other Christian: <1.0%
- Non-religious: 14.0%
- Other religions: <1.0%
- Jewish: <1.0%
- Muslim: <1.0%

The largest denominations by number of adherents in 2000 were the Southern Baptist Convention with 665,307; the United Methodist Church with 179,383; the Roman Catholic Church with 115,967; and the American Baptist Association with 115,916.
