= Yatasi =

Historical Native American tribe from Louisiana

Total population
- merged into the Caddo Nation

Regions with significant populations
- formerly Louisiana

Languages
- Natchitoches language, Caddo language, English

Religion
- Indigenous religion

Related ethnic groups
- Natchitoches peoples within the Caddo confederacy

The Yatasi (Caddo: Yáttasih) were Native American people from northwestern Louisiana and part of the Natchitoches Confederacy of the Caddo Nation. Today, they are enrolled in the Caddo Nation of Oklahoma.

== History ==
Before European contact, the Yatasi lived in the area south of modern Shreveport.

=== 17th century ===
In 1686, French explorer Henry de Tonti visited Yatasi settlements on the Red River. He wrote about them in 1690. They welcomed the French expedition but did not provide him with guides. At the time, the Yatasi were at war the Kadohadacho.

=== 18th century ===
The Yatasi allied with French colonists in 1701. In the early 18th century, the Chickasaw tribe attacked the Yatasi and killed a great number of them. With their numbers reduced, they joined the Ouachita, Doustioni, and Natchitoches Indians at the Natchitoches trading depot. In 1712 to 1714, French-Canadian colonist Louis Juchereau de St. Denis offered the Yatasi protection against the Chickasaws.

During this time the Yatasi traded with the French, then later the Spanish. The Yatasi provided bear fat and bison and deer hides in exchange for cloth, blankets, metal tools and weapons, combs, glass beads, flint, ammunition, vermillion dye, mirrors, and copper.

On 21 April 1770, French-born Indian agent of Spanish Louisiana, Athanase De Mézières y Clugny (c. 1715–1779) presented the Yatasi chief with a medal and presents from the King of Spain. That day the Kadohadacho and Yatasi both agreed to allow Spain proprietorship of their lands and promised not to supply the Comanche, Wichita, Tawakoni, and Kichai tribes with weapons or ammunition.

=== 19th century ===
Introduced diseases devasted the Yatasi, and by 1805, only 8 Yatasi men and 25 Yatasi women and children survived. After the United States took over control of Louisiana, Dr. John Sibley became the Indian agent who oversaw relations with the Yatasi and neighboring tribes. They continued participating in the fur trade, providing bear, deer, beaver, otter, and other furs. In 1826, only 26 Yatasi survived.

== Language ==
The Yatasi spoke a Caddoan language and were culturally similar to surrounding groups such as the Adai. The Yatasi language is attested only in a nine-page vocabulary collected by Albert Gatschet in the 1880s and now archived at the National Anthropological Archives.

== Synonymy ==
"Yáttasih" is a Kadohadacho term, meaning, "Those other people." They were also called the Yataché, Yattapo, Yattassees, Yattasces, Yattasees, Yattasie, Natasse, and Yatachés. Nada and Choye might be two additional Yatasi groups.
