= Sadammo =

The Sadammo (also Caitsodammo, Sadamon, Sadujam, Sadamona, Sadujames) were a Native American tribe, possibly Apache, living in the region of present-day Texas.

The term appears in documents from the 17th and 18th centuries, which describe the Sadammo as enemies of the Hasinai and Kadohadacho, and allies of the Nadamins. The Sadammo are most often considered to be Apache, but some writers have identified them with the Toyals, Nadamins, or Tayos.

17th-century documents describe the Sadammo as a numerous people, living in houses covered with buffalo hide. They owned horses, mules, and iron tools.
