= Eyeish =

Historical Native American tribe in Texas

Total population
- merged into Caddo Confederacy

Regions with significant populations
- Texas

Languages
- Caddoan language

Religion
- Indigenous religion

Related ethnic groups
- other Caddo peoples

The Eyeish were a Native American tribe from present-day eastern Texas.

== History ==
The Eyeish were part of the Caddo Confederacy, although their relationship to other Caddo tribes was ambiguous, and they were often hostile to the Hasinai. They historically lived on the Eyeish Creek, located between the Neches and Sabine Rivers.

Spanish explorers encountered the tribe in 1542 and reported large herds of buffalo in the area. The tribe was not on the best terms with tribes located west of the Trinity River or those to the north near the Red River.

Franciscan monks who traveled on Domingo Ramón's 1716–17 expedition through Texas founded Mission Nuestra Señora de los Dolores de los Ais; however, the Eyeish were not generally accepting of Spanish missionary efforts. After 50 years, the mission only recorded eleven baptisms, seven burials, and three marriages.

In the 18th century, the tribe contracted European diseases such as smallpox and measles from the French and Spanish explorers in the region. The populations decreased but rebounded, from a low of 20 tribal members recorded by John Sibley in 1805, to 160 families recorded in 1828. By then, they lived between the Brazos and Colorado Rivers.

Ultimately, they joined the Wichita and Caddo tribes in Indian Territory.

== Synonymy ==
The tribe is also known as the A'-ish, Aiaichi, Aliche, Aliches, Aiche, Ayays, Hais, Ays, Ahijitos, Aaya, Aays, or Aas. The group known as Hauydix may also have been the Eyeish.

They are not, however, considered to be the same tribe as the Aijados encountered by the Mendoza Expedition of 1683–84, nor are they the same as the Ais people from Florida.

== Language ==
Eyeish
- Region: Texas
- Extinct: 19th century
- Language family: unclassified (Adai?)

Language codes
- ISO 639-3: None (mis)
- Linguist List: 07l
- Glottolog: None

Although the Eyeish people were clearly connected to the Caddo people politically, it is not clear what language they spoke nor how that language relates genealogically to other known languages. Explorer John Sibley wrote that the Eyeish language was one of three unique languages spoken by the Eyeish, the Adai and the Yatasi and Natchitoches people and that Eyeish was spoken by no other group: ‘[it] differs from all other, and is so difficult to speak or understand, that no nation can speak ten words of it.’ He collected a wordlist in 1807 for Thomas Jefferson, but this was lost when a thief stole Jefferson's linguistic papers as they were being moved from Washington, DC to Monticello in Jefferson's second term. Sibley also reported that the Eyeish and Adai were bilingual in Caddo, which was used as a contact language. However, according to informant Caddo Jake's report to John R. Swanton, Eyeish was mutually intelligible with the Adai language. There is no sufficient evidence to conclusively relate Adai to Caddoan languages, the only documentation being a list of 275 words compiled by Sibley. Allan Taylor and Alexander Lesser and Gene Weltfish have speculated that Adai belonged to the Caddoan language family and was possibly a dialect of Caddo.
