= Nanatsoho =

Native American tribe

The Nanatsoho were a Native American tribe that lived at the border of Arkansas, Oklahoma, and Texas.

== History ==
The Nanatsoho were part of the Kadohadacho branch of the Caddo Confederacy. During the late 17th and early 18th centuries, they settled along the Great Bend of the Red River, in present day Bowie and Red River Counties.

Henri Joutel, a French adventurer, was the first known European to contact the Nanatsoho in 1687.

In 1719 French explorer Jean-Baptiste Bénard de la Harpe met Nanatsoho chiefs at a Nasoni village. On 7 April 1719, La Harpe arrived at their settlement on the north bank of the Red River in present day Oklahoma. They lived between the Nasoni and Kadohadacho. Their settlement near a ford, and Nanatsoho hunters have excellent access to buffalo, beaver, and black bear, near tributaries to the Red River.

Ultimately, they assimilated into other Kadohadacho tribes in the 19th century. They are enrolled in the Caddo Nation of Oklahoma today.

== Synonymy ==
The tribe is also known as the Natsoho, Natsoo, Natsoto, Nadsoo, Natsvto, and Nathosos.

== Namesake ==
Nanatsoho Springs in Texas was named for this tribe.
