= Nabiti =

Native American tribe

The Nabiti are a Native American tribe from eastern Texas. Their name means "Cedar Place" in the Caddo language.

== History ==
The Nadaco were part of the Hasinai branch of the Caddo Confederacy, although early European explorers identified the Nabiti as enemies of the Hasinai – a testament to the shifting alliances on the South Plains. They lived in settled villages on the banks of the Angelina River.

Spanish priest Fray Casañas wrote about the Nabiti in 1691. He described them as being one of nine Hasinai tribes and that their territory sat between that of the "Cacháe" (Cacachau) and the "Nasayaha" (Nasoni).

Today, Nabiti people are enrolled in the Caddo Nation, headquartered in Binger, Oklahoma.

== Synonymy ==
The Nabiti were also known as the Amediche, Nabiri, Namidish, Naodiche, Naondiche, Naviti, and Nawidish.
