= Oswichee Creek =

Stream in Georgia, U.S.

Coordinates: 32°18′5.54″N 84°56′15.74″W

Oswichee Creek is a stream in the U.S. state of Georgia. It is a tributary to the Chattahoochee River.

Oswichee was the name of a tribe of the indigenous peoples of the Southeastern Woodlands. A variant spelling is "Oswitchee Creek".
