= Raven Halfmoon =

Caddo painter and sculptor

- Born: 1991 (age 34–35); Norman, Oklahoma, United States
- Citizenship: Caddo Nation; United States
- Education: University of Arkansas
- Website: www.ravenhalfmoon.com

Raven Halfmoon (born 1991) is a painter and sculptor from the Caddo Nation known for oversize clay-based sculptures.

== Biography ==
A member of the Caddo Nation, Halfmoon grew up in Binger and Norman, Oklahoma. She was introduced to working with clay at the age of thirteen and was influenced by Caddo artist Jeri Redcorn. She studied at the University of Arkansas, graduating with a double bachelor's degree in cultural anthropology and ceramics and painting. Halfmoon completed two-year residency at the Archie Bray Foundation for the Ceramic Arts in 2021.

Halfmoon's first solo exhibit, Okla Homma to Manahatta, debuted in 2021 at Ross+Kramer in New York City. It was developed during her Bray Foundation residency. The title of the show combined the Choctaw phrase that gave Oklahoma its name with the Lenape word for Manhattan. The collection consisted of ten large-scale pieces, some weighing upwards of 450 pounds and standing 6 feet tall.

== Education ==
Halfmoon at the age of thirteen was taught how to make clay vessels that were a part of her culture, by the Caddo elders such as Jeri Redcorn. Within her time At the start of her career, she attended the University of Arkansas, within that time frame there she was able to obtain two bachelor's degrees one in ceramics and the other in cultural anthropology. Her time in college allowed her to experiment, having a 3-ft kiln access she always tried to make big pieces of work, in her continued work she uses the coil method. During her time in college, her work had expanded in the Caddo traditions during the time of her classes, taking an anthropology class she learned more about her culture such as how the Olmec heads Easter islands were made.

== Artmaking process ==
The artwork that she focuses on sculpting, which relies on using her ancestry in her Caddo nation, she uses her artwork to revisit old Caddo pottery traditions.

== Select artworks ==
Bah'hatteno Nut'tehsi, (Red River Girl in Caddo), 2021.

The size of the piece comes out as 134.6 x 86.4 x 96.5 cm. Halfmoon features two women's heads facing outwards. the description of the image is a toned dark sculpture with white covered on the top of the head with two red marks of red dripping down the sculpture's face. The intent of the artwork Raven creates is imposing recognizable artwork that shows the artwork through the Caddo nation, to take away the idea of stereotypes about her culture. The current location of this sculpture is in the Ross + Kramer gallery in New York.

Natural Hands, Natural Rider, 2020

This sculpture that was set up is another representation of her culture in the artwork we see this clay sculpture made of a woman riding a horse. In the work that was put into this piece, Raven wanted to break the idea of the romanticized version of stereotypes of her culture and wanted to put out there the strength her work shows of the strong Caddo tribe women. This artwork was created to express her heritage made sure to put into her artwork the color red as it expressed through native American culture of the missing indigenous women who have gone missing who at the same time are those who are being silenced. The same materials used to create this piece used clay to make sure they hold together as one piece to be moved into the kiln and heated up together. Currently, the piece is 114.3 x 55.9 x 110.5 cm, currently located in the Ross + Kramer gallery in New York.

I'm A Covergirl Type Of Girl, 2017

Though most of Raven's artwork has reflected her culture, this artwork has reflected more modernized pieces of still a part of bringing in her cultural practice of the type of pottery artwork they use though this artwork has reflected more modern use. Within the same technique that she used to create her giant piece sculptures of the culture, she used clay to stack up her pieces so they could be fired all at once, though still holding a tribute of making giant pieces of work. The design of the sculpture is dark black stoneware, while red glaze was used on the top of it making the idea of lipstick and the height 30. 5 x 35.6 x 66 cm. The work currently resides in Kourri + Corrao Gallery in New Mexico.

=== Sun Twins, 2023 ===
Artist was born on 1991 in Oklahoma City and lives in Norman, OK. "Sun Twins" is a sculpture of two sisters side by side. She used clay to create this piece. Her artwork shows the strong feminisms. She also uses stoneware, glaze. The size of this sculpture is 77 x 49 x 28 in 195.6 x 124.5 x 71.1 cm.

== Exhibitions ==
- Ancestors - Newmark Gallery (2022)
- HASINAI (Caddo) : Our People - Tinworks Art (2021)
- Okla Homma to Manahatta - Ross+Kramer (2021)
- The New Native - Nino Mier Gallery (2019)

=== Solo exhibitions ===
- Flags of our mother | Ridgefield | Connecticut | USA | Jun 25, 2023 - Jan 07, 2024
- Sunsets in the west | Santa Monica | Los Angeles | California | USA | Mar 25, 2023 - Apr 22, 2023
- Raven Halfmoon: The New Native | Los Angeles | California | USA | Sep 14, 2019 - Oct 26, 2019
- Raven Halfmoon: Okla Homma To Manahatta | Chelsea | New York | USA | Jan 08, 2021 - Feb 14, 2021
- Raven Halfmoon: Caddo Girl in a Material World | Miami | Florida | USA | Nov 07, 2020 - Dec 05, 2020
- ONLINE: Raven Halfmoon: Rumination in Isolation | Lexington | Massachusetts | USA | May 21, 2020
- Raven Halfmoon: New Monuments | Missoula | Montana | USA | Aug 02, 2022 - Dec 31 2022
- Raven Halfmoon | Ghent | New York | USA | Mar 19, 2022 - Jun 12, 2022

=== Group exhibitions ===
- Bates College, Museum of Art | Lewiston | Maine | USA | Oct 27, 2023 - Mar 04, 2024
- Indian Theater: Native Performance, Art, and Self-Determination since 1969 | Annadale on Hudson | New York | USA | Jun 24, 2023 - Nov 26, 2023
- Ceramic Group Show: Ghost | Santa Fe | Santa Fe | New Mexico | USA | Aug 04, 2023 - Sep 09, 2023
- American Woman | New York | USA | Jan 16, 2020 - Mar 07, 2020
- Burke Prize 2019 | Midtown | New York | USA | Oct 03, 2019 - Apr 12, 2020
- 100 Years 100 Women | Old City | Philadelphia | Pennsylvania | USA | Aug 18, 2020 - Sep 27, 2020
- LIMBO act II | Antwerp | Belgium | Oct 17, 2020 - Nov 15, 2020
- The Body, The Object, The Other Park | La Brea | Los Angeles | California | USA | Jan 25, 2020 - Jan 10 2021
- Figure 9 | West Town | Chicago | Illinois | USA | Apr 16 2021 - May 29, 2021
- Pollen On A West Wind | Upper East Side | New York | USA | Feb 09, 2023 - Mar 25, 2023
- In the Middle of Everywhere | Saskatoon | Saskatchewan | Canada | Jun 04, 2022 - Feb 26, 2023
- You Are Heleswv (Medicine) | Atlanta | Georgia | USA | Jun 11, 2022 - Sep 04, 2022
- Light Up The Sky | Los Angeles | California | USA | Jul 09, 2022 - Aug 13, 2022
- Separate/Together | Toronto | Ontario | Canada | Jan 22, 2022 - Feb 26, 2022
- Clay Pop | Soho | New York | USA | Sep 10, 2021 - Oct 30, 2021
- ArtNow 2021 | Oklahoma City | Oklahoma | USA | Jul 29, 2021 - Sep 13, 2021
