= LaRue Parker =

Caddo tribal leader

Sunda LaRue Martin Parker

Chairperson of the Caddo Nation of Oklahoma leader
- Succeeded by: Brenda Shemayme Edwards

Personal details
- Born: July 21, 1935
- Died: May 20, 2011 (aged 75) Anadarko, Oklahoma
- Spouse(s): Leonard Parker, m. 1951
- Children: Six children
- Parent(s): Michael Martin, Wynema Southerland Martin

Sundra LaRue Martin Parker (1935–2011) was the former Chairperson of the Caddo Nation of Oklahoma. She served as chairperson as early as 2000, and was re-elected over opposition candidate, Christine Smith Noah, in the July 9, 2005 election. In 2009, Park was succeeded in the position by Brenda Shemayme Edwards.

Parker was born on 21 July 1935. Her parents were Michael and Wynema Southerland Martin. Her father, Michael Martin, or Silver Moon, of Verden, Oklahoma was a prolific painter with several pieces in the Caddo Heritage Museum's permanent collection.

LaRue was Caddo tribal princess in 1951. On 29 December 1951, Parker married Leonard Parker, and together they had six children.

Parker died on 20 May 2011 in Anadarko, Oklahoma.
