= Natchitoches people =

Historic Native American tribe from Louisiana and Texas

Natchitoches
Náshit'ush

Total population
- Estimated 1600 members

Regions with significant populations
- United States (formerly Louisiana and Texas, today Oklahoma)

Languages
- Natchitoches language, Caddo language, English

Religion
- Indigenous religion

Related ethnic groups
- other members of the Caddo Confederacy, especially the Kadohadacho and Hainai confederacies

The Natchitoches (/ˈnækətɪʃ/ NAK-ə-tish; Caddo: Náshit'ush) are a Native American tribe from northwestern Louisiana and Texas. They organized themselves in one of the three Caddo-speaking confederacies along with the Hasinai (between the Sabine and Trinity rivers in eastern Texas), and Kadohadacho (at the borders of Texas, Oklahoma, Arkansas, and Louisiana).

== History ==
Natchitoches territory was along the Red River of the South in northeastern Texas and northwestern Louisiana, they were important allies of the French in the 17th and 18th centuries, played a major role in the subjugation of the Natchez in the Natchez uprising and the so-called Natchez wars.

In the early 17th century, the Natchitoches were joined by some of the remnants of the Kadohadacho, a tribe with many members who had been killed or enslaved by the Chickasaw. They settled on the Cane River around present-day Natchitoches, Louisiana, which is a city named after the tribe.

== Name ==
Many historians have claimed that the name Natchitoches is derived from the Native word nashitosh meaning "pawpaw people". However, Native American linguist John R. Swanton wrote that the word may actually be derived from nacicit meaning "Place where the soil is the color of red ochre".

== Member tribes ==
Member tribes of the historic Natchitoches Confederation:

- Doustioni or Dotchetonne (Note: Other variants: Souchitioni or Dulcinoe.) were a band who likely lived near the Gulf of Mexico. The French edition led by Sieur de la Salle in 1682 recorded them as allies of the Kadohadacho. J. R. Swanton identified them as a Caddo tribe from the area around Bayou Dauchite in northwestern Louisiana, both are not proven. At the invitation of their French allies, they settled near the related Lower Natchitoches on the Red River. Severely decimated by disease and war, they lost their independent identity and were absorbed by the other Caddo tribes. No further record of the tribe survives.
- (Lower) Natchitoches (Caddo: Náshit'ush or Nashitosh) (lived in the vicinity of the French trading post Natchitoches in Northwest Louisiana; the Upper Natchitoches were part of the Kadohadacho Confederacy to the north)
- Ouachita or Washita (Caddo: Wishita – "good hunting grounds", (Note: Other variants: Yesito.) (lived along the Ouachita River named after them and along the Black River (the name for the lower reaches of the Quachita River after the confluence of the Taensa River) in northeastern Louisiana, about 1690 they settled near Pargoud Landing near today's Monroe, Louisiana, joined the Natchitoches Confederation around 1720 due to losses from disease and wars)
- Yatasi or Lower Yatasi (Caddo: Yáttasih – "Those other people", (Note: Other variants: Yataché, Natasse, Yatache or Yattasses, possible villages or subtribes: Nada and Choye.) lived in the area south of modern Shreveport in Northwest Louisiana, the French were welcomed by the Yatasi as allies in the fight against the then hostile Kadohadacho. At the beginning of the 18th century, the Chickasaw killed a large number of Yatasi, so that the majority joined the Natchitoches Confederation, but a small splinter group - the Upper Yatasi - joined the Kadohadacho Confederation, were important intermediaries first with the French, later with the Spanish, even after the takeover of Louisiana by the Americans they kept the fur trade.)

== Today ==
Descendants of the Natchitoches along with other members of the Caddo Confederacy tribes are enrolled in the federally recognized Caddo Nation of Oklahoma.

In 2017, the State of Louisiana state-recognized the Natchitoches Tribe of Louisiana, affirming its distinct cultural and historical identity. This recognition acknowledges the unique heritage of the Natchitoches people and their continued presence in the region.

== See also ==
- Nacogdoche

== Sources ==
- Edmonds, Randlett (2003). Nusht'uhtiʔtiʔ Hasinay: Caddo Phrasebook. Richardson, TX: Various Indian Peoples Publishing. ISBN 1-884655-00-9.
- Lauber, Almon Wheeler (1969) [1913]. Indian Slavery in Colonial Times Within the Present Limits of the United States. New York: AMS Press [Columbia University Press]. p. 30.
