= Adai language =

Extinct language of Louisiana

Adai
- Adaizan, Adaize
- Tenánat Hadéyas
- Native to: United States
- Region: Louisiana
- Ethnicity: Adai people
- Extinct: Late 19th-century
- Revival: 21st-century
- Language family: Unclassified
- Dialects: Eyeish (uncertain)

Language codes
- ISO 639-3: xad
- Glottolog: adai1235
- Linguasphere: 64-BCA-a
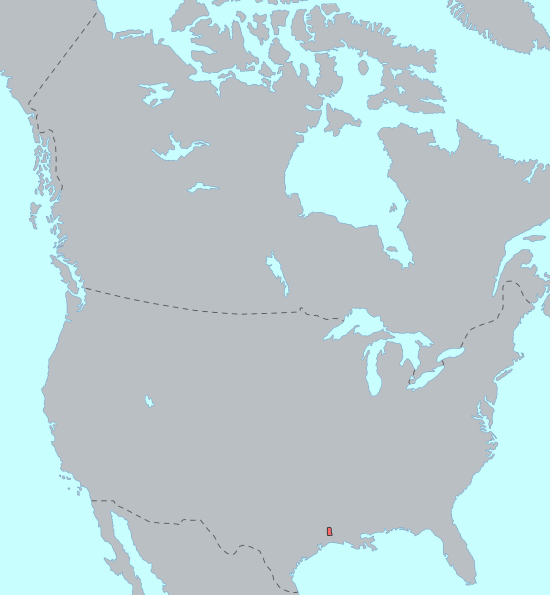
- Pre-contact distribution of Adai

Adai (also known as Adaizan, Adaizi, Adaise, Adahi, Adaes, Adees, Atayos) is an extinct Native American language that was spoken in northwestern Louisiana. It is currently undergoing revitalization by the Adai nation in Louisiana.

== Classification ==
The precise classification of Adai is controversial; it is either a language isolate or part of the larger Caddoan languages. Early 19th and 20th century scholars like Albert Gatschet and John Swanton believed Adai to be a Caddoan language. However, the main issue in the classification of Adai is the lack of materials. Besides an early 19th-century word list of less than 300 items, there is not much else known about the language. Without more words, it is difficult to be certain of its genetic affiliations.

The doctor John Sibley published his word list in 1804. Sibley's word lists of Native American languages are not generally considered to be very accurately transcribed. In the case of Adai, there is no way to verify the information and/or pronunciation he has provided due to a lack of other materials.

== History ==
Adai was spoken in a small region, today located in northwestern Louisiana. They first encountered European settlers in the 16th-century near Robeline, Louisiana. In 1715, the Mission of Adayes was established near where many Adai people lived. In 1792, fourteen Adai families relocated to Texas, and only 100 Adai people remained by the beginning of the 19th-century. After the Louisiana Purchase in 1803, the doctor John Sibley worked on documenting some words in the Adai language. He created a list of 275 items that are the only known surviving materials related to Adai.

In 1805, it was reported that there was an Adai settlement remaining near Lake Macdon. By 1820, only 30 people spoke Adai and the language went extinct in the late 19th-century. Recently, there have been efforts to revitalize the language by the Adai people. The linguist behind the program was trained by the Defense Language Institute at the Presidio of Monterey, California and has translated works like the Star-Spangled Banner into Adai.
