= Tula people =

Historic Native American tribe in Arkansas

Tula
Total population
- extinct

Regions with significant populations
- Arkansas

Languages
- possibly Caddoan language

Religion
- Indigenous religion

Related ethnic groups
- other Caddo peoples

The Tula were a Native American group that lived in what is now western Arkansas. The Tula are known to history only from the chronicles of Spanish conquistador Hernando de Soto's exploits in the interior of North America.

== History ==
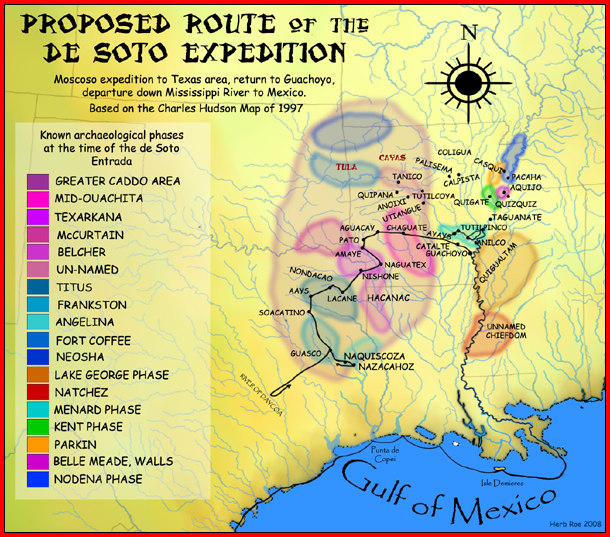
de Soto route through the Caddo area, with known archaeological phases marked

The Tula were possibly a Caddoan people, but this is not certain. Based on the descriptions of the various chroniclers, "Tula Province", or their homeland, may have been at the headwaters of the Ouachita, Caddo, Little Missouri, Saline, and Cossatot Rivers in Arkansas. They may have lived along the Arkansas River in western Arkansas.

They are also thought to have lived in the northern Ouachita Mountains in the Petit Jean and Fourche valleys.

De Soto entered Tula territory on September 30, 1541, near present-day Fort Smith, Arkansas and violently clashed with the tribe multiple times during the beginning of October 1541. His secretary, Rodrigo Ranjel described the Tula as, "the best fighting people that the Christians met with." A statue was erected in the late 20th century to commemorate the Tula, but de Soto scholars suspect that the location of the statue does not correspond with the Tula's actual homeland. The Tula are thought to be the first Caddo band to encounter Europeans.

The 16th-century Spanish chroniclers wrote that the Tula practiced cranial deformation and tattooed their faces. They fought with large spears.

An archaeological site, Bluffton Mound site (3YE15), 35 to 40 miles southwest of the Arkansas River is associated with the Tula. The site is a Caddoan Mississippian culture mound center.

Ethnographer John Reed Swanton proposed that the Tula assimilated into other Kadohadacho tribes, whose descendants would be enrolled in the Caddo Nation of Oklahoma today.

== Language ==
Their language was unlike the Quapaw language, leading historians to believe they spoke a Caddoan language.

== Synonymy ==
The word "Tula" is not a Caddo word. The tribe and province are also known as Tulia.

== See also ==
- List of sites and peoples visited by the Hernando de Soto Expedition
