= Jeri Redcorn =

Native American Oklahoman pottery artist

- Born: Jereldine Elliot; November 23, 1939 (age 86); Albuquerque, New Mexico
- Citizenship: Caddo Nation of Oklahoma, United States
- Known for: ceramics
- Movement: Caddo pottery
- Website: redcornpottery.com

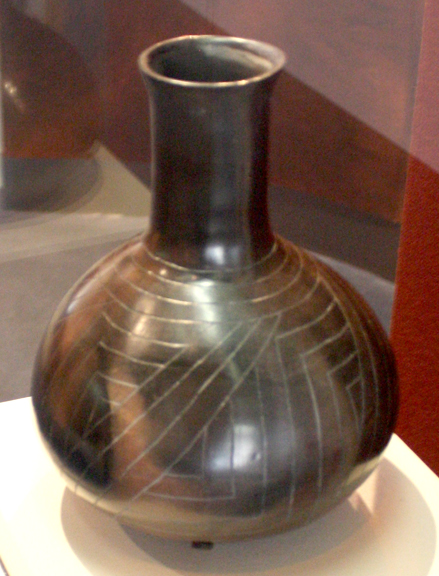
Caddo pot by Jereldine Redcorn (2005), collection of the Oklahoma History Center.

Jereldine "Jeri" Redcorn (born November 23, 1939) is an Oklahoman artist who single-handedly revived traditional Caddo pottery.

== Background ==
Jereldine Redcorn was born on 23 November 1939 at the Indian Hospital in Albuquerque, New Mexico. Her father was Caddo, and her mother was Potawatomi. Redcorn grew up in Colony, Oklahoma, living on the allotment lands of her Caddo grandmother, Francis Elliot. Her tribal name is Bah-ha Nutte, meaning "River Woman." She graduated from Colony High School, then earned a Bachelor of Science degree from Wayland Baptist University in Plainview, Texas and her master's degree from the Pennsylvania State University in University Park, Pennsylvania.

== Revival ==
In 1991, Redcorn and fellow members of the Caddo Cultural Club visited the Museum of the Red River in Idabel, Oklahoma. There they saw hundreds of precontact Caddo pots, which even the tribal elders were completely unfamiliar with. "That day we were so excited that we decided as a group, as a tribe, we would learn how to do it and make Caddo pottery once again," Redcorn said. Her brother taught her the basics of coiled pottery. With extreme difficulty, she learned burnishing and engraving techniques.

== Artwork ==
In 1991, Redcorn began experimenting and teaching herself how to make pottery using traditional Caddo methods, which involve coiling the clay and incising for decoration. She uses metal or bone tools to incise her pots with ancestral Caddo designs and hand fires them, instead of using a commercial kiln. To add color, she rubs red clay into the incised designs.

== Collections ==
Redcorn's pottery is found in several public collections, including the following:

- Bob Bullock Texas State History Museum
- Oklahoma History Center
- Smithsonian Institution National Museum of the American Indian, George Gustav Heye Center
- Smithsonian Institution National Museum of Natural History.

In 2009, First Lady Michelle Obama displayed a pot by Jeri Redcorn, Intertwining Scrolls, in the White House.

== Personal life ==
Redcorn was married to Charles Redcorn, an Osage Nation author. Together, they lived in Norman, Oklahoma until his death in 2017.
