= Ouachita people =

Historical Native American tribe in Louisiana

Ouachita
Total population
- merged into Caddo Confederacy

Regions with significant populations
- Louisiana

Languages
- Caddoan language

Religion
- Indigenous religion

Related ethnic groups
- other Caddo peoples

The Ouachita were a Native American tribe who lived in northeastern Louisiana along the Ouachita River.

== History ==
The Ouachita were loosely affiliated with the Caddo Confederacy. Their traditional homelands were the lower reaches of the Ouachita River in present-day northeastern Louisiana and along the Black River. Around 1690, the tribe is believed to have settled at Pargoud Landing on the Ouachita River. This was later the site of a French trading post, and ultimately the present-day city of Monroe, Louisiana developed around it.

Jean-Baptiste Le Moyne, Sieur de Bienville, a French-Canadian colonizer, encountered the Ouachita people in 1700. He first met members of the tribe transporting salt to the Taensa. Bienville traveled to the principal Ouachita village, which he described as housing 70 people in five houses. The Ouachita assimilated into the Natchitoches tribe by the 1720s. Today's descendants are enrolled in the Caddo Nation of Oklahoma.

The Ouachita are known for their traditional practice of burying horses.

== Name ==
According to the Encyclopedia of Oklahoma History and Culture, Ouachita is a French spelling of a Native word washita, which translates as "good hunting ground". Louis R. Harlan claimed that "Ouachita" is composed of the Choctaw words ouac for buffalo and chito for large, together meaning "country of large buffaloes". At one time, herds of buffalo inhabited the lowland areas of the Ouachitas. Historian Muriel H. Wright wrote that "Ouachita" is composed of the Choctaw words owa for hunt and chito for big, together meaning "big hunt far from home".

The Ouachita Mountains of Oklahoma and Arkansas and Ouachita River of Arkansas and Louisiana were named for the tribe, as was Lake Ouachita. The Washita River, Ouachita Parish, Louisiana, and Washita County, Oklahoma, were also named for the tribe, as well as the town of Washita, Oklahoma.

The tribe may also be known as the Yesito.
