= Cahinnio =

Historical Native American tribe in Arkansas

Total population
- merged into Caddo Confederacy

Regions with significant populations
- Arkansas, now Oklahoma

Languages
- Caddoan language

Religion
- Indigenous religion

Related ethnic groups
- other Caddo peoples

The Cahinnio were a Native American tribe that lived in Arkansas.

The Cahinnio were part of the Caddo Confederacy, possibly affiliated with Kadohadacho. In 1687 French explorer René-Robert Cavelier, Sieur de La Salle encountered the tribe, they settled near Red River, in southwest Arkansas.

In July 1687, Father Anastasius Douay, a French priest, visited a Cahinnio village near present-day Arkadelphia, Arkansas.

In the 1680s, French explorer Henri Joutel traveled with the La Salle expedition, to Cahinnio territory. He wrote that they presented his expedition with two loaves of corn bread, describing it as "the finest and the best we had so far seen; they seemed to have been baked in an oven, and yet we not noticed any among them." Joutel noted that corn was an important food staple among the Cahinnio, as were beans and sunflower seeds. Additionally he recorded that the Cahinnio used deer hide for pouches and bearskins for rugs.

The Cahinnio were known for their superior bows, which they made from Osage orange wood.

During the 18th century, the Cahinnio moved northwest, possibly due to new sources of salt and horses. They settled along the southern bank of the Ouachita River. By 1763, they moved to the upper Arkansas River. In 1771, the Cahinnio and several neighboring tribes signed a peace treaty with the French.

Ultimately, they assimilated into other Kadohadacho tribes by the 19th century. They are enrolled in the Caddo Nation of Oklahoma today.

== Synonymy ==
The tribe is also known as the Cachaymon, Cahaynohoua, Caynigua, Cahainihoua, Cainione, and Caynaya.
