= Hainai =

Indigenous American tribe

The Hainai (Caddo: Háynay) were a Native American tribe that lived in what is now east Texas.

== Nomenclature ==
The Hainai are also sometimes called Ainais, Aes, Ainay, Ais, Aix, Aynais, Aynays, Ays, Ayses, Ioni, Huawni, or Ayonai.

== History ==
The Hainai were the leading group in the Hasinai confederacy. They were a part of the Caddo Nation, and traditionally lived on the Neches and Angelina rivers to the west of present-day Nacogdoches. In 1805, the group was reported to consist of 80 warriors by Dr. John Sibley, the Indian agent of the United States at Natchitoches, Louisiana. In 1837 the Republic of Texas makes reference to the Hainai in connection with Yowani Choctaws living on Attoyac Bayou in what is now southeastern Rusk County, Texas. The historian Mooney also noted the Yowani as a part of the Caddo Confederacy. The direct connection, aside from Texas references between the Hainai and the Yowani is unknown. One theory from the late historian/genealogist Cecil Lee Pinkston-Vinson was that Choctaw Tom, an influential Caddo leader who was a Yowani married to a Caddo woman, had his encampment attacked by forces led by Captain Peter Garland just off the Brazos Reservation. The attackers were a vigilante force from Erath County, Texas resulting in the death of twenty-eight Indians. Choctaw Tom was believed to be the son of Yowani leader Atahobia. His descendants are believed to have traveled north to the present Caddo Nation.

Today, the Hainai Caddo descendants are enrolled citizens of the Caddo Nation of Oklahoma with its headquarters in Binger, Oklahoma.
