= Caddo =

Native American tribe in Oklahoma

Caddo Hasí꞉nay
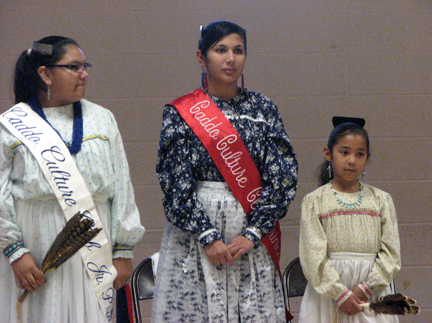
- Caddo Nation citizens, members of the Caddo Cultural Club, Binger, Oklahoma, 2008

Total population
- approximately 6,300

Regions with significant populations
- Oklahoma, United States (formerly Arkansas, Louisiana, and Texas)

Languages
- English, formerly Caddo

Religion
- Ghost Dance, Native American Church, Christianity

Related ethnic groups
- Pawnee, Wichita, Kichai, Arikara; Caddo Confederacies: Adai, Cahinnio, Eyeish, Hainai, Hasinai, Kadohadacho, Nabedache, Nabiti, Nacogdoche, Nadaco, Nanatsoho, Nasoni, Natchitoches, Nechaui, Neche, Ouachita, Tula, Yatasi

The Caddo people (Caddo language: Hasí꞉nay) comprise the Caddo Nation of Oklahoma, a federally recognized tribe headquartered in Binger, Oklahoma. They formerly spoke the Caddo language.

The Caddo Confederacies were networks of Indigenous peoples of the Southeastern Woodlands, who historically inhabited much of what is now northeast Texas, western Louisiana, southwestern Arkansas, and southeastern Oklahoma. Prior to European contact, they were the Caddoan Mississippian culture, who constructed huge earthwork mounds at several sites in this territory, flourishing about 800 to 1400 CE. In the early 19th century, Caddo people were forced to a reservation in Texas. In 1859, they were removed to Indian Territory.

== Government and civic institutions ==
Map of Caddo Nation's tribal jurisdictional area (OTSA) and nearby jurisdiction areas, shared with Wichita and Affiliated Tribes and Delaware Nation.

The Caddo Nation of Oklahoma was previously known as the Caddo Tribe of Oklahoma. The tribal constitution provides for election of an eight-person council, with a chairperson.

Some 6,000 people are enrolled in the nation, with 3,044 living in Oklahoma. Individuals are required to document at least 1/16 Caddo ancestry to enroll as citizens.

In July 2016, Tamara M. Francis was reelected as the chairman of the Caddo Nation. Chairman Tamara Francis is the daughter of the first elected female chairman, Mary Pat Francis. She was the fourth elected female leader of the Caddo Nation.

As of 2025, the tribal council consists of:

- Chairman: Bobby Gonzalez
- Vice Chairwoman: Kelly Howell Factor
- Secretary: Jennifer Reeder
- Treasurer: Verna Castillo
- Anadarko representative: Tracey Martine
- Binger representative: Kara Dougherty
- Fort Cobb representative: Arlene Kay O'Neal
- Oklahoma City representative: Brittany Habbart.

The tribe has several programs to invigorate Caddo culture. It sponsors a summer culture camp for children. The Hasinai Society and Caddo Culture Club both teach and perform Caddo songs and dances to keep the culture alive and pass it on to the next generations. The now-defunct Kiwat Hasinay Foundation was dedicated to preserving and increasing use of the Caddo language.

== Precontact history ==
=== Archaeology ===
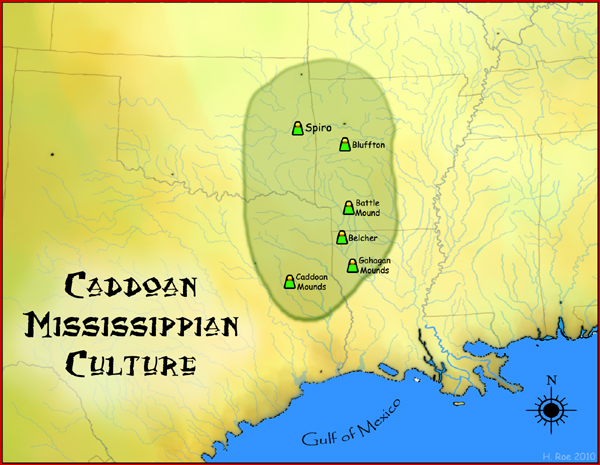
Map of the Caddoan Mississippian culture and some important sites

The Caddo are thought to be an extension of Woodland period peoples, the Fourche Maline and Mossy Grove cultures, whose members were living in the area of Arkansas, Louisiana, Oklahoma, and Texas areas between 200 BCE and 800 CE. The Wichita and Pawnee are also related to the Caddo, since both tribes historically spoke Caddoan languages.

By 800 CE, this society had begun to coalesce into the Caddoan Mississippian culture. Some villages began to gain prominence as ritual centers. Leaders directed the construction of major earthworks known as platform mounds, which served as temple mounds and platforms for residences of the elite. The flat-topped mounds were arranged around leveled, large, open plazas, which were usually kept swept clean and were often used for ceremonial occasions. As complex religious and social ideas developed, some people and family lineages gained prominence over others.

By 1000 CE, a society that is defined by archaeologists as "Caddoan" had emerged. By 1200, the many villages, hamlets, and farmsteads established throughout the Caddo world had developed extensive maize agriculture, producing a surplus that allowed for greater density of settlement. In these villages, artisans and craftsmen developed specialties. The artistic skills and earthwork mound-building of the Caddoan Mississippians flourished during the 12th and 13th centuries.

The Spiro Mounds, near the Arkansas River in present-day southeastern Oklahoma, were some of the most elaborate mounds in the United States. They were made by Mississippian ancestors of the historic Caddo and Wichita tribes, in what is considered the westernmost area of the Mississippian culture. The Caddo were farmers and enjoyed good growing conditions most of the time. The Piney Woods, the geographic area where they lived, was affected by the Great Drought from 1276 to 1299 CE, which covered an area extending to present-day California and disrupted many Native American cultures.

Archeological evidence has confirmed that the cultural continuity is unbroken from prehistory to the present among these peoples. The Caddoan Mississippian people were the direct ancestors of the historic Caddo people and related Caddo-language speakers, such as the Pawnee and Wichita, who encountered the first Europeans, as well as of the modern Caddo Nation of Oklahoma.

=== Religion ===
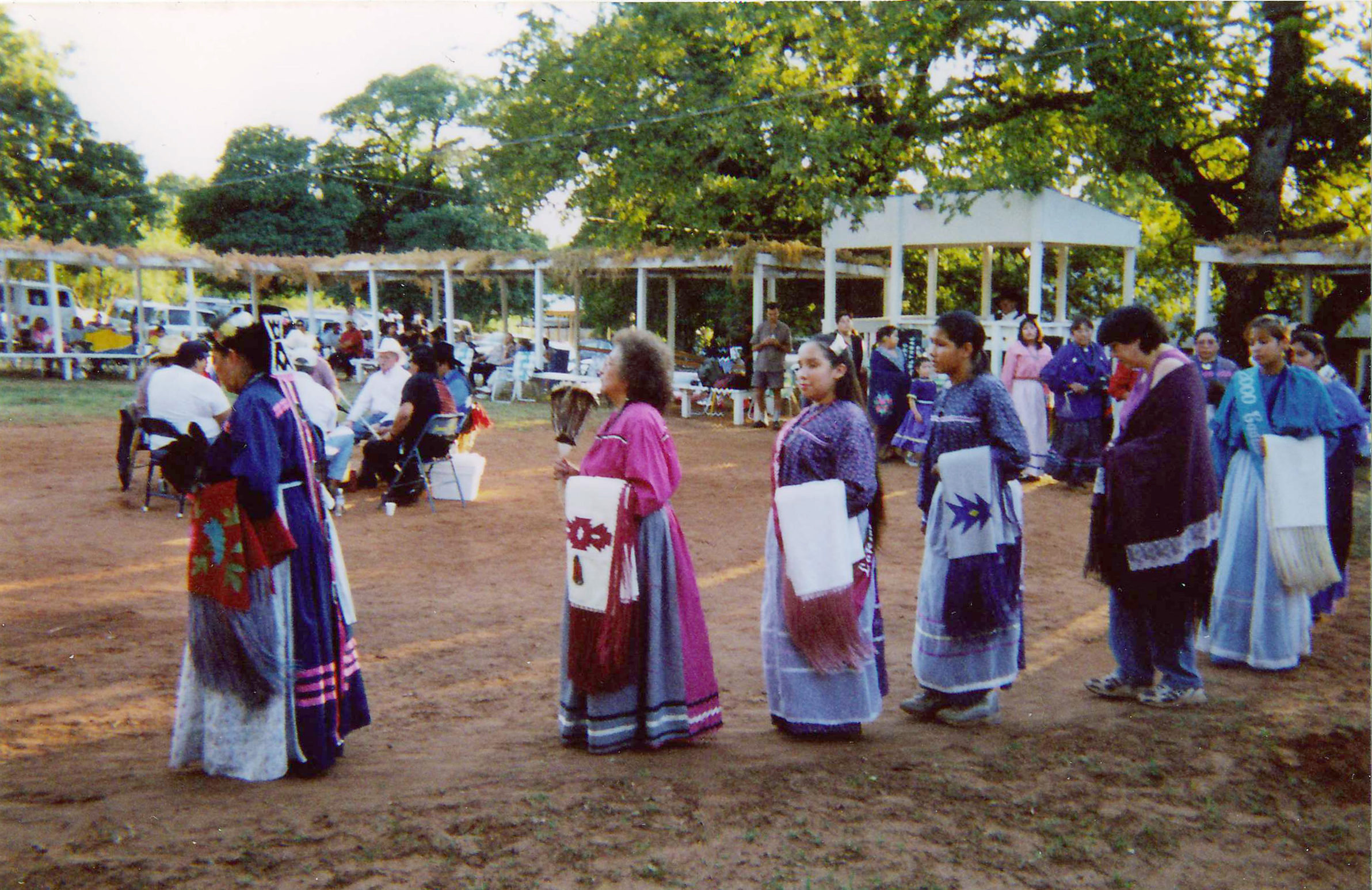
Caddo turkey dance, Caddo National Complex, Binger, Oklahoma, 2000: The turkey dance relays Caddo history.

The Caddo creation story, as told in their oral history, says the tribe emerged from a cave, called Chahkanina or "the place of crying", located at the confluence of the Red River of the South and Mississippi River (in northern present-day Louisiana). Their leader, named Moon, instructed the people not to look back. An old Caddo man carried a drum, a pipe, and fire, all of which have continued to be important religious items to the people. His wife carried corn and pumpkin seeds. As people and accompanying animals emerged, the wolf looked back. The exit from the underground closed to the remaining people and animals.

The Caddo peoples moved west along the Red River, which they called Bah'hatteno in Caddo. A Caddo woman, Zacado, instructed the tribe in hunting, fishing, building dwellings, and making clothing. Caddo religion focuses on Kadhi háyuh, translating to "Leader Above" or "Leader in the Sky". In early times, the people were led by priests, including a head priest, the xinesi, who could commune with spirits residing near Caddo temples. A cycle of ceremonies developed around important periods of seasonal corn cultivation. Tobacco was also cultivated, and was and is used ceremonially. Early priests drank a purifying sacrament drink made of wild olive leaves.

=== Territory ===
Centuries before extensive European contact, some of the Caddo territory was invaded by migrating Dhegihan Siouan–speaking peoples - the Osage, Ponca, Omaha, Quapaw, and Kaw. They moved west beginning about 1200 CE after years of warfare with the Haudenosaunee nations in the Ohio River area of present-day Kentucky. The powerful Iroquois took control of hunting grounds in the area.

The Osage in particular fought the Caddo, pushed them out of some former territory, and became dominant in the region of present-day Missouri, Arkansas, and eastern Kansas. These tribes had become settled in their new territory west of the Mississippi prior to mid-18th-century European contact.

Most of the Caddo historically lived in the Piney Woods ecoregion of the United States, divided among the state regions of East Texas, southern Arkansas, western Louisiana, and southeastern Oklahoma. This region extends up to the foothills of the Ozarks. The Piney Woods are a dense forest of deciduous and pinophytal flora covering rolling hills, steep river valleys, and intermittent wetlands called "bayous". Caddo people primarily settled near the Caddo River.

When they first encountered Europeans and Africans, the Caddo tribes organized themselves in three confederacies: Natchitoches, Hasinai, and Kadohadacho. They were loosely affiliated with other neighboring tribes, including the Yowani Choctaw. The Natchitoches lived in now northern Louisiana, the Haisinai lived in East Texas, and the Kadohadacho lived near the border of Texas, Oklahoma, and Arkansas.

The Caddo people had a diet based on cultivated crops, particularly maize (corn), but also sunflower, pumpkins, and squash. These foods held cultural significance, as did wild turkeys. They hunted and gathered wild plants, as well.

=== Culture ===
The Caddo Native Americans had a culture that consisted of the hunting and gathering dynamic. The men hunted year round, while the young and healthy women were responsible for the gathering of fruits, seeds, and vegetables for the tribe. Elderly women planted and cultivated the seeds for the season's crop. Gathered items included maize, sunflowers, beans, melons, tobacco, and squash during the warm seasons. Acorns and roots were gathered and processed to provide food other than meat in the cold seasons when crops did not grow.

The men used handcrafted bows and arrows to hunt animals such as wild turkey, quail, rabbits, bears, and bison during winters. Most tools and items were made by women. They made wooden mortars, as well as pots and other utensils out of clay. These wood and clay tools were carved and molded to help with daily jobs such as cooking meals for the tribe. These tools were viewed with such reverence that men and women were buried with the items that they had made.

The Caddo also decorated their bodies. Men favored body modifications and ornamentation such as the painting of skin, jewelry, ear piercing, and hair decorations, like braids, adorned with bird feathers or animal fur. While the women of the tribe wore some jewelry and styled their hair similarly to men, most used the art of tattooing to decorate their bodies. Such tattoos covered most of the body, including the face.

== Post-contact history ==
The Caddo first encountered Europeans and Africans in 1541 when the Spanish Hernando de Soto Expedition came through their lands. De Soto's force had a violent clash with one band of Caddo Indians, the Tula people, near present-day Caddo Gap, Arkansas. This historic event has been marked by the modern town with a monument.

The Spanish were considered outsiders. All Franciscan missions were set up in peripheral locations in relation to temples complexes which were the center of the Caddo's world. The Caddos didn't want to move near the missions because they would abandon their sacred fires. According to Fray Isidro Felix de Espinosa, the Caddo believed "our [Spanish] fire is different." On a deeper level the security of the Caddo relied on centuries of living in dispersed settlements.

French explorers in the early 18th century encountered the Natchitoche in northern Louisiana. They were followed by fur traders from French outposts along the Gulf Coast. Later Catholic missionaries from France and Spain also traveled among the people. The Europeans carried infections such as smallpox and measles, because these were endemic in their societies. As the Caddo peoples had no acquired immunity to such new diseases, they suffered epidemics with high fatalities that destroyed the tribal populations. Influenza and malaria were additional new diseases that caused many deaths among the Caddo.

French traders built their trading posts and associated forts near Caddo villages. These were already important hubs in the Great Plains trading network well before the 18th and 19th centuries. These stations attracted more French and other European settlers. Among such settlements are the present-day communities of Elysian Fields and Nacogdoches, Texas, and Natchitoches, Louisiana. In the latter two towns, early explorers and settlers kept the original Caddo names of the villages.

Having given way over years before the power of the former Ohio Valley tribes, the later Caddo negotiated for peace with the waves of Spanish, French, and finally Anglo-American settlers. After the 1803 Louisiana Purchase, by which the United States took over the former French colonial territory west of the Mississippi River, the US government sought to ally with the Caddo peoples. During the War of 1812, American generals such as William Henry Harrison, William Clark, and Andrew Jackson crushed pro-British uprisings among other southeast Indians, in particular the Creek, also known as Muscogee. Tensions within their tribe resulted in near civil war among the Creek.

Due to the Caddo's neutrality and their importance as a source of information for the Louisiana Territory government, the US forces left them alone, but following Congressional passage of the Indian Removal Act of 1830 under President Andrew Jackson, the federal government embarked on a program of removal of tribes from the Southeast to enable European-American settlement. Land-hungry migrants pressed from the east.

In 1835, the Kadohadacho, the northernmost Caddo confederacy, signed a treaty with the US to relocate to independent Mexico (which then included present-day Texas). The area for their reservation in East Texas had been lightly settled by Mexican colonists, but rapidly increasing immigration of European Americans was occurring here. In 1836, the Anglo-Americans declared independence from Mexico and established the Republic of Texas, an independent nation. The name "Texas" is derived from the Hasinai word táysha, through the Spanish Tejas, meaning "friend".

On December 29, 1845, the US admitted Texas as a state. At that time, the US federal government forced the Hasinai and the Kadohadacho, as well as remnants of allied Delaware (Lenape) and Yowani to relocate onto the Brazos Reservation. White settlers increased pressure for the Brazos Reservation Indians to move north to Indian Territory. White Texans violently attacked a Caddo encampment just off the reservation on December 26, 1858. Captain Peter Garland from Erath County led this vigilante group. Choctaw Tom led the Caddo. Married to a Hasinai woman, Tom was killed in this fight, along with two other Caddos and five Anadarkos. In 1859, many of the Caddo were relocated to Indian Territory north of Texas (which became the state of Oklahoma in 1907). After the Civil War, the Caddo were concentrated on a reservation located between the Washita and Canadian Rivers in Indian Territory.

In the late 19th century, the Caddo adopted the Ghost Dance religion, which was widespread among American Indian nations in the West. John Wilson, a Caddo/Delaware medicine man who spoke only Caddo, was an influential Ghost Dance leader. Practitioners believed that the dance would help them return to their traditional ways and to stop European-American intrusions into their land and culture. In 1880, Wilson became a peyote roadman. The tribe had known the Half Moon peyote ceremony, but Wilson introduced the Big Moon ceremony to them. The Caddo Nation remains very active in the Native American Church today.

=== Late 19th century to present ===
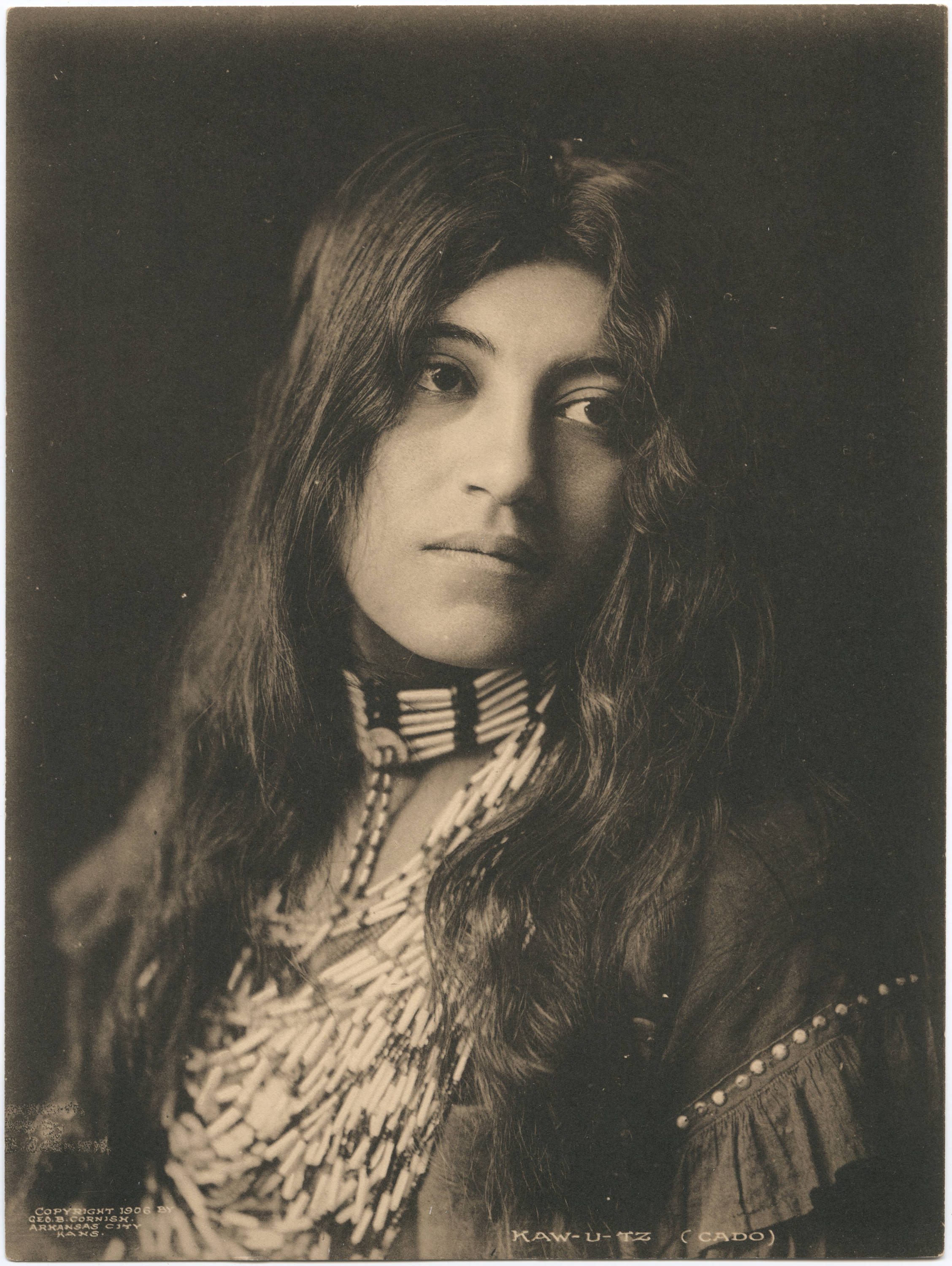
Kaw-u-tz, photographed in 1906

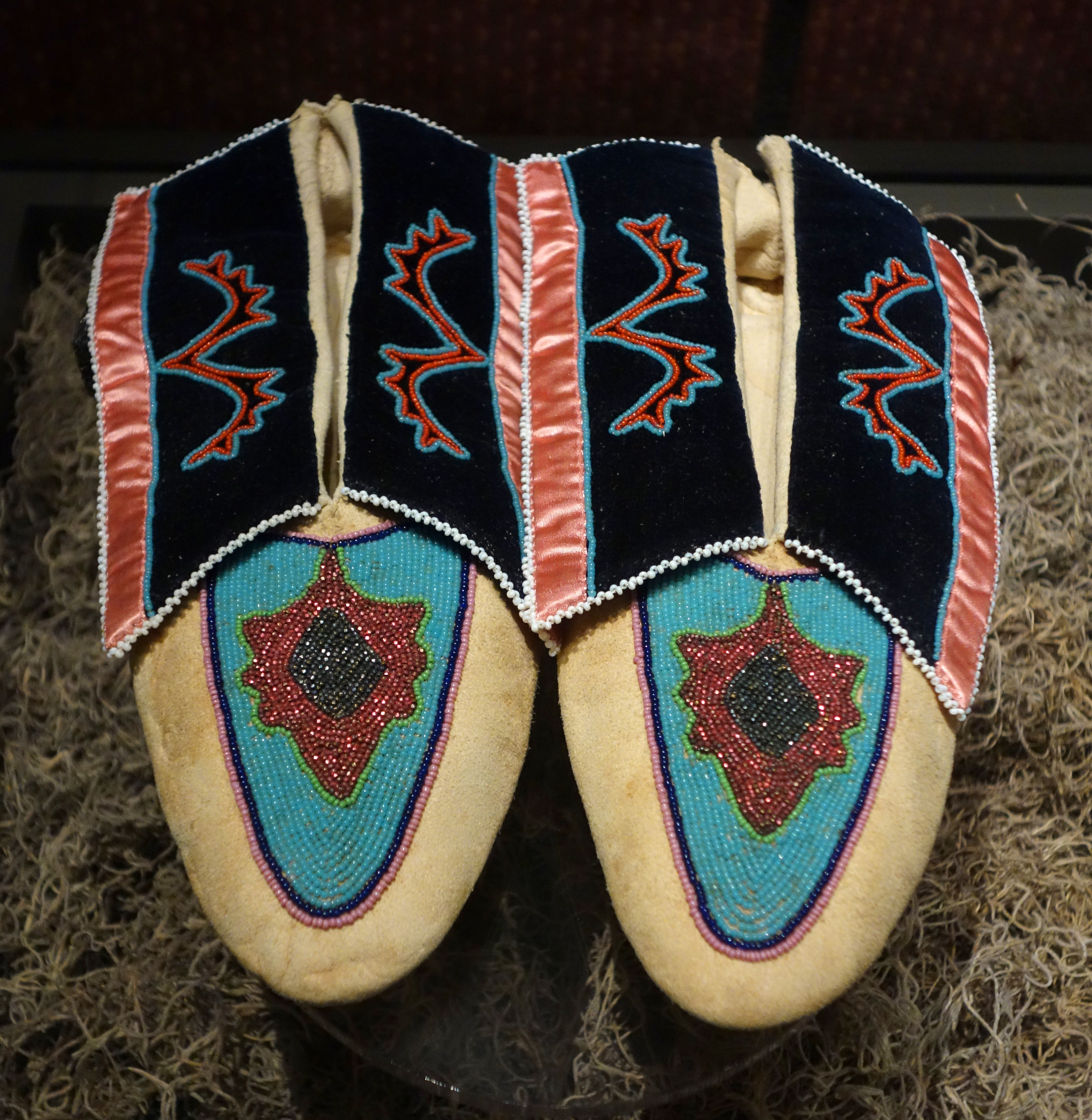
Moccasins made by Mrs. Sien-Coit Sturm (Caddo), circa 1909, collection of the Bata Shoe Museum, in Toronto, Ontario

Congress passed the Dawes Act to promote assimilation of tribes in Indian Territory and to extinguish Indian land claims to enable admission of the territory as a state. It authorized the break-up and distribution of tribal communal landholdings into 160-acre allotments for individual households for them to establish subsistence family farms along the European-American model. Any tribal lands remaining after such allotments were to be declared "surplus" and sold, including to non-Native Americans. At the same time, tribal governments were to be ended, and Native Americans were to be accepted as US citizens, subject to state and federal laws. Numerous European Americans had already settled outside the tribal territories.

The Caddo vigorously opposed allotment. Whitebread, a Caddo leader, said, "because of their peaceful lives and friendship to the white man, and through their ignorance were not consulted, and have been ignored and stuck away in a corner and allowed to exist by sufferance." Tribal governments were dismantled at this time, and Native Americans were expected to act as state and US citizens. After some period, the adverse effects of these changes were recognized. The Caddo and other Native American peoples suffered greatly from the disruption of their traditional cultures, and lost much of their lands in the decades after allotment.

== 20th-century reorganization ==
Under the federal Indian Reorganization Act of 1934 and the Oklahoma Indian Welfare Act of 1936, the Caddo restored their tribal government. They adopted a written constitution and a process of electing officials. They organized in 1938 as the Caddo Indian Tribe of Oklahoma. They ratified their constitution on January 17, 1938. In 1976, they drafted a new constitution, which continues elected representative government.

During the 20th century, Caddo leaders such as Melford Williams, Harry Guy, Hubert Halfmoon, and Vernon Hunter have helped shape the tribe. In the early 1980s, Mary Pat Francis was the first woman to be elected as tribal chair. Her daughter, Tamara Michele Francis, was elected in 2015, following a time of high divisions. She was re-elected in 2016.

In a special election on June 29, 2002, the tribe adopted six amendments to the constitution. Tribal enrollment is open to individuals with a documented minimum of 1/16 degree Caddo blood quantum.

== 21st-century tribal issues ==
Sometimes, severe disagreements have developed among factions of the tribe that have not been resolved in elections. In August 2013, a group led by Philip Smith attempted to recall Brenda Shemayme Edwards, the chairman of the tribal council. This faction conducted a new election, but the victor stepped down, and Edwards refused to leave office. In October 2013, Smith and his supporters broke into the Caddo Nation headquarters. They chained the front doors from the inside and blocked the entrance to the administration building. The opposition called the Bureau of Indian Affairs Police.

Operation of the tribe was split between two factions. The Court of Indian Offenses, which had been overseeing issues for a year because of the internal conflict, in October 2014 ordered a new election for all positions.

In the January 2015 elections, all the top tribal positions were won by women: Tamara Michele Francis as chair, Carol D. Ross as vice chair, Jennifer Reeder as secretary, and Wildena G. Moffer as treasurer.

In July 2016, Tamara M. Francis was re-elected as the chairman of the Caddo Nation. The 2016 council consisted of Chairman Francis, Vice Chairman Carol D. Ross, Acting Secretary Philip Martin, Treasurer Marilyn McDonald, Oklahoma City Representative Jennifer Wilson, Binger Representative Marilyn Threlkeld, and Fort Cobb Representative Maureen Owings. Chairman Francis is the daughter of the first elected female chairman, Mary Pat Francis (who was elected in the 1980s). Tamara Francis is the fourth elected female leader of the Caddo Nation.

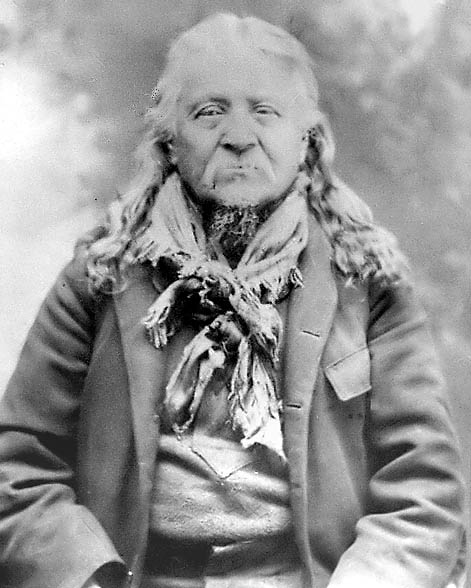
John Wilson (1840-1901), Caddo peyote roadman

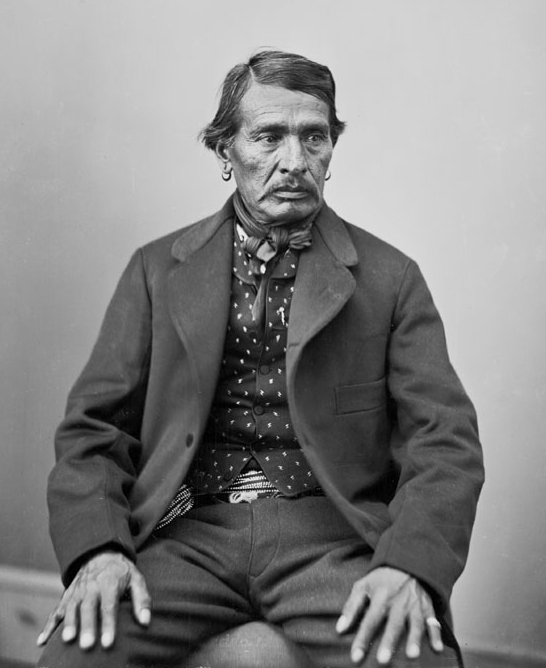
Sho-e-tat (Little Boy) or George Washington (1816-1883), Louisiana Caddo leader

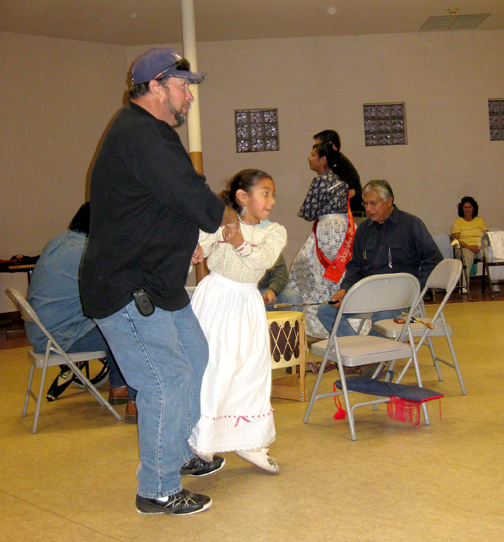
A stirrup dance by the Caddo Culture Club, Caddo National Complex, Binger, 2008

== Notable people ==
- T. C. Cannon, Kiowa/Caddo painter and printmaker
- Chase Kahwinhut Earles, ceramic artist
- Raven Halfmoon, sculptor and painter
- LaRue Parker, tribal chairperson
- Jeri Redcorn, Caddo/Potawatomi ceramic artist
- Louis Weller (1904–1979), professional American football player
- John Wilson, Peyote roadman

== See also ==
- Caddo Lake
- List of sites and peoples visited by the Hernando de Soto Expedition
- Caddo Mounds State Historic Site
- Gahagan Mounds Site
- Spiro Mounds
