= Kadohadacho =

The Kadohadacho (Note: Alternate spellings include: Cadodacho, Caddudacho, Cadodache, Cadodacho, Cadogdacho, Cadudacho, Caodache, Caodacho, Cododacho, Caudacho, Caudodocho.) (Caddo: Kadawdáachuh) are a Native American tribe within the Caddo Confederacy. Today they are enrolled in the Caddo Nation of Oklahoma.

== History ==
The Kadohadacho traditionally lived at the borders of Texas, Oklahoma, Arkansas, and Louisiana. They cultivated crops, such as corn, beans, squash, and pecans, and manufactured bows and pottery for trade.

Traveling parties of Kadohadacho encountered the Hernando De Soto expedition in 1541, but the Spaniards did not enter their territory. In 1687, the tribe welcomed the survivors of the La Salle expedition into their villages in Texas. From that point onward, the Kadohadacho maintained friendly relations with the French.

In the 17th and 18th centuries, they were one of three clusters of Caddo tribes. Their group consisted of four communities settled near the Great Bend of the Red River, in modern-day Lafayette County, Arkansas.

During the early 18th century, they were attacked and many were either slain or enslaved by the Chickasaw. Some remnants of the tribe fled west and joined the Nassoni and the Caddoan-speaking Natchitoches. By the late 18th century, the remaining Kadohadacho joined their Nachitoches relatives in northwestern Louisiana.

== Removal ==
In 1845 the US federal government removed both the Kadohadacho and the Hasinai to the Brazos Reservation in Texas. In 1859, these tribes were again removed, with other Caddo tribes, to Indian Territory on a reservation located between the Canadian and Washita Rivers.

== Today ==
The Kadohadacho are enrolled members of the Caddo Nation of Oklahoma, headquartered in Binger, Oklahoma, along with the Hasinai, the Hainai, and other Caddo tribes. The Kadohadacho dialect of the Caddo language, closely related to the Hasinai and Natchitoche dialects, is still spoken today.
