= Nasoni =

Native American tribe from eastern Texas and southwestern Arkansas

The Nasoni are a Native American tribe from eastern Texas and southwestern Arkansas.

== History ==
The Nasoni were divided into two bands. The Upper Nasoni, who lived along the Red River in the southwestern corner of Arkansas. They were affiliated with the Kadohadacho branch of the Caddo Confederacy. The Lower Nasoni, who lived between the Sabine and Angelina Rivers in present-day Rusk County, Texas. They were part of the branch of the Caddo Confederacy.

Hernando De Soto encountered the Lower Nasoni in 1541. During René-Robert Cavelier, Sieur de La Salle's 1686 expedition, members of his party were greeted by the Lower Nasoni and carried into their town for welcoming festivities.

During the 17th through 19th centuries, European diseases, particularly smallpox, wreaked havoc upon Nasoni and other Caddo groups, forcing them to consolidate for survival.

In 1719, French explorers established a fort and trading post on the Red River, Le Poste des Cadodaquious, opposite of an Upper Nasoni village. They traded firearms, ammunition, metal tools, beads, clothing, and accessories for hides and horses. The Upper Nasoni allied with the French from 1719 to 1762.

In 1716, Spanish monks founded the San José de los Nazones Mission to serve the Nadaco and the Lower Nasoni tribes. The Lower Nasoni allied with the Spanish during the 18th century. By 1880, their population had been so ravaged by disease, that it is believed they assimilated into the Nadaco tribe.

Today, Nasoni people are enrolled in the Caddo Nation, headquartered in Binger, Oklahoma.

== Synonymy ==
Hernando De Soto referred to the tribe as the Nassohone. The Lower Nasoni were called Nasaya, Nasayaha, Nasayaya, Nasoui, Nassoni, Nassonite, Nazone, Nazoni. The Nasoni were also called Assony and Nisohoni.
