= Caddoan languages =

Family of Native American languages

Caddoan
- Geographic distribution: Great Plains, North America
- Linguistic classification: One of the world's primary language families
- Subdivisions: Northern; Caddo †

Language codes
- ISO 639-5: cdd
- Linguasphere: 64-B
- Glottolog: cadd1255
- Pre-contact distribution of Caddoan languages

The Caddoan languages are a family of languages native to the Great Plains spoken by tribal groups of the central United States, from present-day North Dakota south to Oklahoma. There are only 2 currently spoken languages, as the number of speakers for this family has declined markedly due to European colonization, lack of institutional support, and other factors.

== Family division ==
Five languages belong to the Caddoan language family:

- Caddoan languages
  - Caddo †
  - Northern Caddoan
    - Wichita †
    - Pawnee–Kitsai
      - Kitsai †
      - Pawnee–Arikara
        - Pawnee (10 speakers)
        - Arikara (10 speakers)

Caddo, Kitsai and Wichita have no speakers left. Kitsai stopped being spoken in the 19th century when its members were absorbed into the Wichita tribe. Wichita stopped being spoken in 2016, when the last native speaker of Wichita, Doris McLemore (who left recordings and language materials), died. Caddo stopped being spoken in 2025, when the last native speaker, Edmond Johnson, died.

All of the remaining Caddoan languages spoken today are severely endangered. As of 2007, both the Pawnee and Arikara languages only had 10 speakers. Pawnee is spoken in Oklahoma by small numbers of tribal elders. Arikara is spoken on the Fort Berthold Reservation in North Dakota.

Prior to colonization and US expansion, speakers of Caddoan languages were more widespread. The Caddo, for example, lived in northeastern Texas, southwestern Arkansas, and northwestern Louisiana, as well as southeastern Oklahoma. The Pawnee formerly lived along the Platte River in what is now Nebraska.

== Prehistory ==
Glottochronology is a controversial method of reconstructing, in broad detail, the history of a language and its relationships, though it may still provide useful insights and generalizations regarding a family's history. In the case of Proto-Caddoan, it appeared to have divided into two branches, Northern and Southern, more than 3000 years ago. (The division of the language implies also a geographic and/or political separation).

South Caddoan, or Caddo proper, evolved in north-eastern Texas and adjacent Oklahoma, Arkansas, and Louisiana. Other than Caddo, no daughter languages are known, but some unrecorded ones likely existed in the 16th and the 17th centuries.

Northern Caddoan evolved into several different languages. The language that became Wichita, with several different dialects, branched off about 2000 years ago. Kitsai separated from the Northern Caddoan stem about 1200 years ago, and Pawnee and Arikara separated 300 to 500 years ago.

== External relations ==
Adai, a language isolate from Louisiana is known only from a 275-word list collected in 1804, and may be a Caddoan language, however documentation is too scanty to determine with certainty. Adjacent to the Caddo lived the Eyeish or Ais—not to be confused with the Ais of Florida—who also spoke a language that may have been related to Caddoan.

Some linguists believe that the Caddoan, Iroquoian, and Siouan-Catawban languages may be connected in a Macro-Siouan language family, but their work is suggestive and the theory remains hypothetical. Similar attempts to find a connection with the Algonquian languages have been inconclusive. There is insufficient evidence for linguists to propose a hypothetical Macro-Algonquian/Iroquoian language family.

== Reconstruction ==
Some Proto-Northern Caddoan reconstructions by Chafe (1979):

gloss	Proto- Northern Caddoan	Pawnee	Arikara	Wichita	Caddo
arm	*win-	pí:ruʔ	wí:nuʔ	wi:rʔa	mí:suh
blood	*pat-	pá:tuʔ	pá:tuʔ	wa:ckicʔa	bahʔuh
bone	*kis-	kí:suʔ	čí:šuʔ	ki:sʔa	
egg	*nipik-	ripí:kuʔ	nipí:kuʔ	nikʷi:kʔa	nibih
eye	*kirik-	kirí:kuʔ	ciríːkuʔ	kirikʔa	
intestine	*riyac-	ré:cuʔ	né:suʔ	niya:cʔa	nahč’uh
leg	*kas-	ká:suʔ	ká:xuʔ	ka:sʔa	k’á:suh
liver	*karik-	karí:kuʔ	karí:kuʔ	karikʔa	kánk’uh
skunk	*niwit	ríwit	níwit	niwi:c	wihit
sun	*sak-(h)un-	sakú:ruʔ	šakú:nuʔ	sa:khirʔa	sak’uh
wood	*yak-	rá:kuʔ ’box’	há:kuʔ ’box’	haːkʔa/-ya:k-	yaʔk’uh

For Proto-Caddoan, Chafe (1979) reconstructs the following phonemes.

Vowels
	Front	Central	Back
High	*i		*u
Low		*a	

Consonants
	Labial	Alveolar	Palatal	Velar	Glottal
Nasal		*n			
Stop	*p	*t		*k	*ʔ
Affricate		*ts ⟨c⟩			
Fricative		*s			*h
Approximant	*w	*r	*j ⟨y⟩		

== Vocabulary ==
Below is a list of basic vocabulary of Northern Caddoan languages from Parks (1979):

No.	English	Arikara	Pawnee	Kitsai	Wichita
1	I	-t-	-t-	-t-	-c-
2	thou	-x-	-s-	-s-	-s-
3	we	-sir-	-cir-	-ci- (incl. dual)	-cíːy-
4	this	ti	ti	tiʔi	tiʔi
5	that	i	i	i-, anini ‘by that’	haːríːh
6	chest	waːkuːkáu?	awaːkiːsuʔ	nikokíːsu	khiːkʔa
7	not	ka-	ka-	ka-	kírih
8	all	čitúːʔ	kituː	akwác	asséːhah
9	many	ranihuːn	kari	nirahkina ‘there are many’	iyarhah
10	one	áxkux	ásku	arísku	ass
11	two	pítkux	pítku	cásu, cúsu	wicha
12	big	rihuːn	rihuːr	nikin	tac; Riwaːc
13	woman	sápat	cápat	cakwákt	kaːhiːkʔa
14	man	wíːta	píːta	wiːta	wiːc
15	person	sáhniš	cáhriks	kírika	ihaːs
16	fish	čiwáhtš	kacíːki	nitát	kaːcʔa
17	bird	níkus	ríkucki	kuːcáke, kucáki	ichir
18	dog	xáːtš	ásaːki	anúːsa	kicíyeːh
19	tree	naháːpi	rahaːpe	yáku (wood); ayákwi	tiyaːhkw
20	seed	načiríːkuʔ	rákiriːkuʔ	nikiríːkʔu	nikiːsʔa
21	leaf	sčeːkaráːkuʔ	kskéːkaraːkuʔ	yakánu	kíʔincaːcʔa
22	root	kasukaːwíuʔ	rákapahcuʔ	ayakakunayahkasa	ʔaskiːcʔa
23	bark	haːkiskúːxuʔ	ráːkickuːsuʔ	yakatakuác	tíːkʔacʔiyaːcʔa
24	skin	sahnišskúːxuʔ	ckáriːtuʔ	arahkita	kithaːrʔa
25	meat	tsástš	kísacki	neːtanaːs, awánas	ʔarasʔa
26	blood	páːtuʔ	páːtuʔ	kwáːtu	waːckicʔa
27	bone	číːšuʔ	kíːsuʔ	kíːsu	kiːsʔa
28	grease	čisahítš	kícahihtuʔ	yahtkiríyu ‘hot’; kinasíːtu ‘lard’	kiraːsʔa
29	egg	nipíːkuʔ	ripíːkuʔ	nikwíːku	nikwiːkʔa
30	horn	aríːkuʔ	paːríːkuʔ, aríːkuʔ	aríːku	ʔarikʔa
31	tail	nitkúːʔ	ritkuːʔu	nitkúhu	kiːyaːkʔa
32	feather	híːtuʔ	íːtuʔ	híːtuʔ	niːsʔa
33	hair	úːxuʔ	úːsuʔ	ickóːsu	tiyaːcʔa
34	head	páxuʔ	páksuʔ	kwitácuʔ íckoʔo ‘about head’	weʔekʔa
35	eye	čiríːkuʔ	kiríːkuʔ	kiriːkʔu	kirikʔa
36	nose	siníːtuʔ	icúːsuʔ	icúːsu	tisʔa
37	mouth	haːkáʔuʔ	háːkauʔ	háːku	haːkaʔa
38	tooth	áːnuʔ	áːruʔ	anhíːsuʔ	aːkʔa
39	tongue	háːtuʔ	háːtuʔ	háːtuʔ	hacʔa
40	fingernail	šwíːtuʔ	kspíːtuʔ	kskwíːtu	iskwicʔa
41	foot	áxuʔ	ásuʔ	asúʔ	asʔa
42	knee	paːčíːšuʔ	páːkiːsuʔ	kirikisnayus	kiːskwasʔa
43	hand	íšuʔ	íksuʔ	íksuʔ	iskʔa
44	neck	číːsuʔ	kíːcuʔ	natíːnu	kiticʔa
45	breasts	éːtuʔ	éːtuʔ	isáːtu	eːcʔa
46	liver	karíːkuʔ	karíːkuʔ	karíːku	karikʔa
47	drink	čiːka	kíːka	kíːka	-kikʔa
48	eat	waːwa-a	waːwa-a	wawaʔánu, wáwaʔa	-waːwaʔa
49	bite	kaʔus	kauc	takocóhu ‘bite it’	-taʔa
50	see	ut... e.rik	ut... eːrik	tuciʔeːriksu ‘he sees it’	ʔiːs
51	hear	atka-u	atka-u	atkarahkus ‘hear it’	ʔaːckhéʔe
52	know	ut...reːsiːš	ir...raːʔiːta	atihayaki ‘I know it’	wickaʔa
53	sleep	itka	itka	itka	-hiʔinck
54	die	koːt	hurahac	híːksta ‘died’	-teʔes
55	kill	koːtik	kuːtik	ki	ki
56	swim	huːseːriːtik	huːceːriːtik	nutoceríːtik ‘he swims’	-arhiya ‘to bathe’
57	fly	awanu	awari	niahak, -a-	ʔiːtoː (+loc.)ʔa
58	laugh	awaxk	awask	awas naʔaʔa ‘comes in air’	-wakharikikw
59	come	in...a	in...a	ináhu ‘he is coming’	u-a... ʔa
60	lie	ša	sa	sa	ʔirhawi
61	sit	kux	ku	wi	ʔicaki
62	stand	arič	arik	áriki	ariki
63	cut	kakatk	kakatk	kakatk	-kack
64	say	waːko	waːku	wáku	wakʔa
65	sun	šakúːnuʔ	sakúːruʔ	sakúːnu	saːkhirʔa
66	moon	páh	pá	cúhkwá	wáːh
67	star	sákaːʔa	úːpirit	nikwírik	híːkwirikʔa
68	water	tstóːxuʔ	kíːcuʔ	akicóːnu	kicʔa
69	rain	tsuhíːnuʔ	ácuhuːruʔ	nahacaʔa	a...hiriʔa (verb only)
70	stone	kanítš	karítki	kátanu	ʔikaːʔa
71	sand	čiwíhtuʔ	kíwiktuʔ	kiwíktu	kiːchaːrʔa
72	earth	hunáːnuʔ	huráːruʔ	hunáːna	hiraːrʔa
73	cloud	skarahkataháːnuʔ	ckáuʔ	nácton	keʔeːrʔa
74	smoke	naːwíːšuʔ	ráːwiːsuʔ	aːrosː	ickweʔeːkʔa
75	fire	čeːkáʔuʔ	keːkauʔ ‘flame’	akiak	yecʔa (n.); -keʔe ‘be a fire’
76	ash	itkanahtúːsuʔ	karáktuhcuʔ	itkáːnu	ickhaːrʔa ‘dust, sand’
77	burn	in...kunistaʔa	kahuːriktik, ir...kunstaʔa	nahúniku, -hurik	-hiri
78	path	hatúːnuʔ, -sat-	hatúːruʔ	nuhyaːtáta ‘path goes’	hachirʔa; -yac ‘to be path’
79	mountain	wáːʔuʔ	wáːuʔ	arakauh	nawaːreʔerhárih ‘where there are mountains’
80	red	pahaːt	pahaːt	kwahtnyú	kwaːc
81	blue	tareːʔuːx	tareːʔuːs	arayósː	kawʔac
82	yellow	rahkatáːn	rahkataːr	kisísː, kwanis	narisis
83	white	čiːsawatáːn	taːkaːr	kahcnú	khac
84	black	katíːt	katíːt	katinuk	kaːrʔiːs
85	night	nitkaháːnuʔ	rátkahaːruʔ	natki-	ckhaːrʔa
86	hot	in...awiristo	ir...awirictu	rahtátkiu ‘it’s hot’	wariːckhaːrʔa
87	cold	in...raːnanaːxitu	ir...raraːsitu	nahenóːku ‘it’s cold’	-hkwic
88	sated	kaːwačiːt	kaːwakiːt	ahinoːsana ‘becomes sated’	tawaːwi
89	good	un...heːr	ur...heːr	ickuruːku, ickorók	acs
90	round	riwiru	riwiru	ariwíok	táriwiːk
91	three	tawihk-	tawihk-	táwihko	tawhaː
92	grass	húːnuʔ	íːruʔ	acíːu	híːyaːkhaːrʔa
93	guts	néːsuʔ	réːcuʔ	kiréːcu, kiriacu	niyaːcʔa
94	wind	hutúːnuʔ	hutúːruʔ	hutúːnu	niweʔéːrʔa
95	foggy	pihuː	pihuː	rúsca	-ʔiskwaːwi
96	urinate	kaːsuː	kaːcuː	wíahas ‘he urinates’	-aːhas
97	tie	ut...tareːpi	ut...tareːpu	atonocakósk ‘I tie it’	-thiyaki
98	sing	raːkaroːk	raːkaruːk	kurawáknu ‘he is singing’	kiraːh
99	spit out	hawat	hawat	ahatkicowati ‘he spits’	hawati
100	cry	čikak	kikak	akikakóhu	ʔiriki
