= Caddo language =

Extinct Caddoan language of the Southern US

Caddo
- Hasí꞉nay
- Pronunciation: [hasí:nəj]
- Native to: United States
- Region: Caddo County, western Oklahoma
- Ethnicity: 6,300 Caddo people (2016, tribal enrollment estimate)
- Extinct: July 14, 2025 with death of Edmond Johnson
- Revival: 2022
- Language family: Caddoan: Caddo
- Dialects: Hasinai; Hainai; Kadohadacho; Natchitoches; Yatas

Language codes
- ISO 639-2: cad
- ISO 639-3: cad
- Glottolog: cadd1256
- ELP: Caddo
- Linguasphere: 64-BBA-a
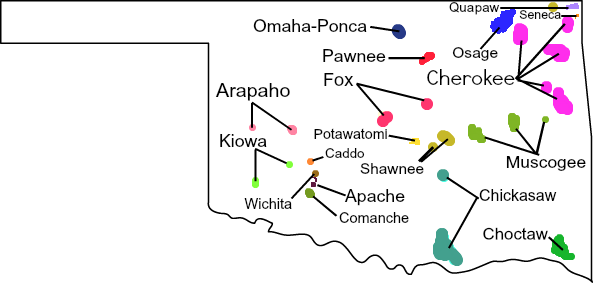
- Map showing the distribution of Oklahoma Indian Languages

Caddo (endonym: Hasí꞉nay, pronounced [hasíːnəj]) is a Caddoan language indigenous to the Southern United States and the traditional language of the Caddo Nation. It is recently dormant, with the last native speaker dying in 2025, down from 25 native speakers in 1997; nevertheless there are revitalization programs. Caddo had several mutually-intelligible dialects. The most commonly used dialects were Hasinai and Hainai; others included Kadohadacho, Natchitoches and Yatasi.

== Classification ==
Caddo is member of the Caddoan language family; this family includes the Pawnee-Kitsai (Keechi) languages (Arikara, Kitsai, and Pawnee) and the Wichita language. Like Caddo, Kitsai and Wichita are now dormant.

Another language, Adai, is postulated to have been a Caddoan language while it was extant, but because of scarce resources and the language's extinct status, this connection is not conclusive, and Adai is generally considered a language isolate.

== Revitalization ==
The Caddo Nation is making a concentrated effort to save the Caddo language. The Kiwat Hasí꞉nay ('Caddo Home') foundation, located at the tribal home of Binger, Oklahoma, offered regular Caddo language classes, in addition to creating dictionaries, phrase books, and other Caddo language resources. They also made a long-term project of trying to record and digitally archive Caddoan oral traditions, which are an important part of Caddo culture.

As of 2010, a Caddo app is available for Android phones. As of 2012, the Caddo Nation teaches weekly language classes; language CDs, a coloring book, and an online learning website are also available.

There is a Caddo grammar, published August 2018, and an in-depth examination of the Caddo verb, published in 2004.

In August 2022 the Caddo Nation Language Preservation Program was launched. The program's goals are to archive resources in the language, share their resources through community events and programs, and develop a curriculum to teach the language.

== Phonology ==
=== Consonants ===
Caddo has 19 contrastive consonants, a normal-sized consonant inventory. It is somewhat unusual in that it lacks liquid consonants. The IPA symbols for the consonants of Caddo are given below:

| | | Bilabial | Alveolar | Palatal | Velar | Glottal |
|---|---|---|---|---|---|---|
| Nasal | | m | n | | | |
| Plosive | voiceless | p | t | | k | ʔ |
| Plosive | voiced | b | d | | | ʔ |
| Plosive | ejective | | tʼ | | kʼ | ʔ |
| Affricate | plain | | ts | tʃ | | |
| Affricate | ejective | | tsʼ | tʃʼ | | |
| Fricative | | | s | ʃ | | h |
| Glide | | | | j | w | |

Caddo also features contrastive gemination of consonants, which is generally indicated in orthography by a double letter: ⟨nɑ́ttih⟩ "woman".

=== Vowels ===
Caddo has three contrastive vowel qualities: /i/, /a/ and /u/, and two contrastive vowel lengths, long and short.

| | Front | Central | Back |
|---|---|---|---|
| High | i iː | | u uː |
| Low | | a aː | |

However, there is a great deal of phonetic variation in the short vowels. The high front vowel /i/ is generally realized as its lower counterpart /ɪ/, and the high back vowel /u/ is similarly often realized as its lower counterpart /ʊ/. The low central vowel /ä/ has a wider range of variation, pronounced (most commonly) as /ɐ/ when it is followed by any consonant except a semivowel or a laryngeal consonant, as a low central /ä/ at the end of an open syllable or when followed by a laryngeal consonant, and as /ə/ before a semivowel.

In general, the long vowels do not feature this kind of variation but are simply lengthened versions of the phonemes that are represented in the chart.

Caddo also has four diphthongs, which can be written a number of different ways; the transcription below shows the typical Caddo Nation orthography (a vowel paired with a glide) and the IPA version, represented with vowels and offglides.

- ay /aj/ – like English eye
- aw /aw/ – somewhat like British English out
- iw /iw/ – like the English interjection ew!
- uy /uj/ – somewhat like English boy

=== Tone ===
Caddo has three lexical tones: a low tone (e.g. /ù/), unmarked in the orthography ⟨u⟩; a high tone (e.g. /ú/), marked by an acute accent over the vowel ⟨ú⟩; and falling tone, which always occurs on long vowels (e.g. /ûː/) and is marked by a grave accent over the vowel ⟨ù꞉⟩.

Tone occurs both lexically (as a property of the word), non-lexically (as a result of tonological processes), and also as a marker of certain morphological features. For instance, the past tense marker is associated with high tone.

==== Tonological processes ====
There are three processes that can create non-lexical high tone within a syllable nucleus. See the section below for an explanation of other phonological changes which may occur in the following examples.

1. H-deletion
  VhCC → V^{High}CC
  An /h/ before two consonants is deleted and the preceding vowel gains high tone:
  /kiʃwɑhn-t-ʔuh/ → [kiʃwɑ́nːt'uh] "parched corn"
2. Low tone-deletion
  VRV^{Low}C → V^{High}RC
  A low tone vowel following a resonant (sonorant consonant) is deleted, and the preceding vowel gains a high tone.
  /sa-baka-nah-hah/ → [sawkɑ́nːhah] "does he mean it?"
3. Backwards assimilation
  VRV^{High} → V^{High}RV^{High}
  A vowel preceding a resonant and a high tone vowel gains high tone.
  /nanɑ́/ → [nɑ́nɑ́ː] "that, that one"'

=== Phonological processes ===
==== Vowel syncope ====
There are two vowel syncope processes in Caddo, which both involve the loss of a low-tone vowel in certain environments. The first syncope process is described above as low tone-deletion. The second syncope process is interconsonantal syncope, described below:

VCV^{Low}CV → VCCV
A low-tone vowel in between a vowel-consonant sequence and a consonant-vowel sequence is deleted.
(Shown with intermediary form): /kak#(ʔi)t'us-jaʔah/ → kahʔit'uʃaʔah → [kahʔit'uʃʔah] "foam, suds"

==== Consonant cluster simplification ====
As a result of the syncope processes described above, several consonant clusters emerge that are then simplified by way of phonological process. At the present stage of research, the processes seem to be unrelated, but they represent a phonetic reduction in consonant clusters; therefore, they are listed below without much further explanation.

1. nw → mm
2. tw → pp
3. tk → kk
4. n → m / __ [+labial]
5. ʔʔ → ʔ
6. hh → h
7. ʔ+Resonant → Resonant+ʔ / syllable final

==== Syllable coda simplification ====
Similar to the consonant cluster simplification process, there are four processes by which a syllable-final consonant is altered:

1. b → w / syllable final
2. d → t / syllable final
3. k → h / syllable final (but not before k)
4. tʃ → ʃ / syllable final

==== Word boundary processes ====
There are three word-boundary processes in Caddo, all of which occur word-initially:

1. n → t / # __
2. w → p / # __
3. y → d / # __

ni-huhn-id-ah/ → [tihúndah] "she returned"

Such processes are generally not applicable in the case of proclitics (morphemes that behave like an affix and are phonologically dependent on the morpheme to which they are attached). An example is the English articles.

==== Glottalization ====
Caddo has a glottalization process by which any voiceless stop or affricate (except p) becomes an ejective when it is followed by a glottal stop.

[-sonorant, -continuant, -voice, -labial, -spread glottis] → [+constricted glottis] / ___ [+constricted glottis, -spread glottis]
A voiceless stop or affricate (except p) becomes an ejective when it is followed by a glottal stop.
/sik-ʔuh/ → [sik'uh] "rock"

==== Palatalization ====
Caddo has a palatalization process that affects certain consonants when they are followed by /j/, with simultaneous loss of the /j/.

1. /kj/ → [tʃ]
2. /sj/ → [ʃ]

/kak#ʔa-k'as-jaʔah/ → [kahʔak'a ʃʔah] " one's leg"

(Melnar includes a third palatization process, /tj/ → [ts]. However, /ts/ is not a palatal affricate so it has not been included here. Nevertheless, the third process probably occurs.)

==== Lengthening ====
Caddo has three processes by which a syllable nucleus (vowel) may be lengthened:

Process One
V^{High}(Resonant)CVC# → V^{High}(Resonant)ːCVC#
When the second-to-last syllable in a word has a nucleus consisting of a high tone vowel (and, optionally, a resonant), and the last syllable has the form CVC, the high tone nucleus is then lengthened.
/bak-'ʔawɑ́waʔ/ → [bahʔwɑ́ːwaʔ] "they said"

Process Two
V(Resonant)ʔ → V(Resonant) ː / in any prepenultimate syllable
In any syllable before the penultimate, a glottal stop coda is deleted, and the remaining nucleus is lengthened.
/hɑ́k#ci-(ʔi)bíhn-saʔ/ → [hɑ́hciːbíːsaʔ] " I have it on my back"

Process Three

1. ij → iː
2. uw →uː

Any syllable nucleus with ij or uw must convert to a long vowel.

== Influence ==
The Caddo word táy:sha’ ([tə́jːʃaʔ]), meaning 'ally' or 'friend', is the ultimate origin of the place name Texas.
