= Indigenous peoples of Louisiana =

Total population
- 0.7% (2020)

Languages
- Native American languages, American Indian English

Religion
- Native American religion, Native American Church

The state of Louisiana is home to four federally recognized Native American tribes. They are as follows.

- Chitimacha Tribe of Louisiana
- Coushatta Tribe of Louisiana
- Jena Band of Choctaw Indians
- Tunica-Biloxi Indian Tribe

== Reservations ==
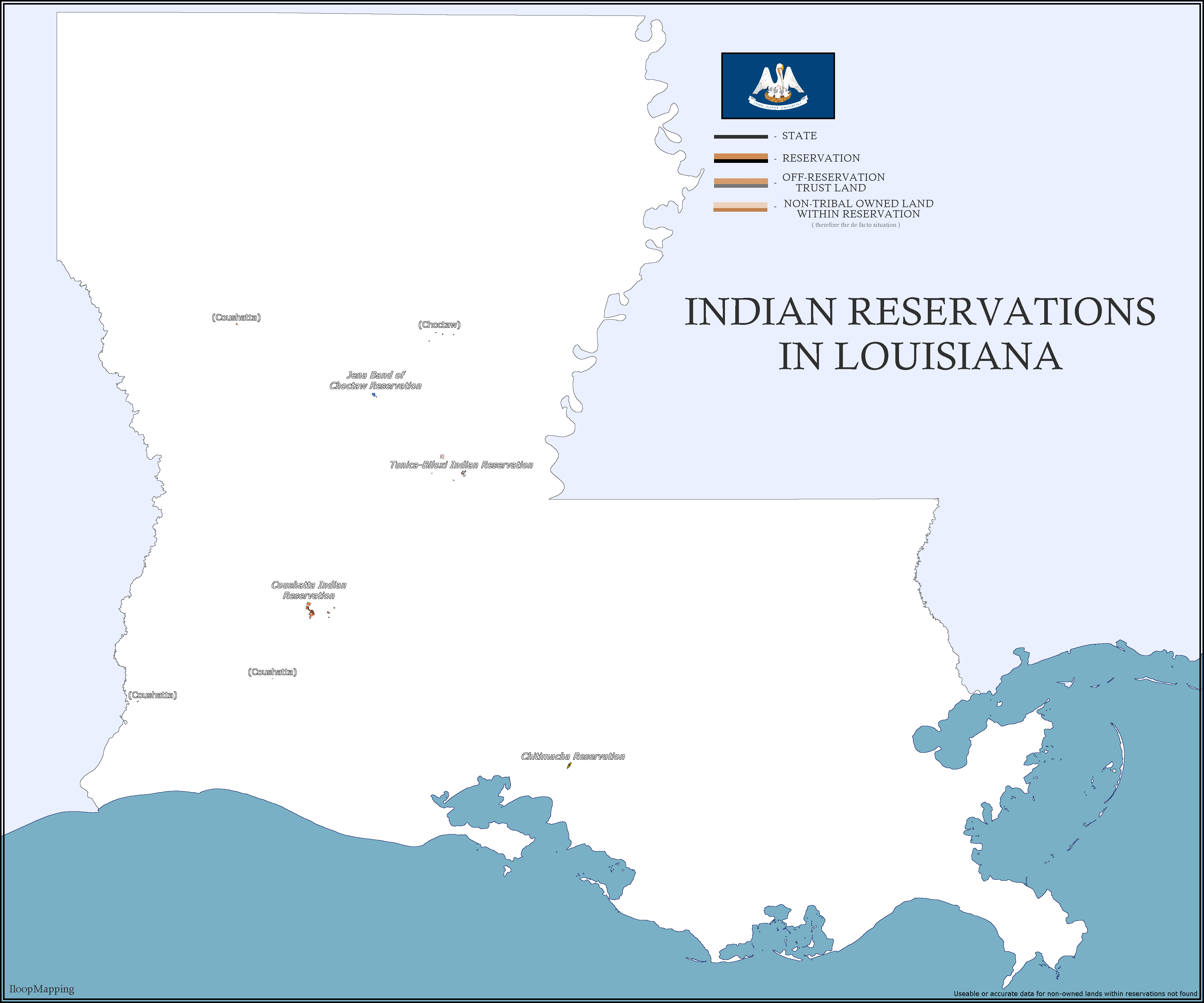
Map of Indian reservations in Louisiana.

== Historical tribes ==
Indigenous peoples of the Southeastern Woodlands who have historically lived in Louisiana include the following.

- Acolapissa
- Apalachee
- Apalachicola
- Atakapa
- Bayogoula
- Biloxi
- Caddo

- Adai
- Hasinai
- Kadohadacho
- Natchitoches
- Ouachita
- Yatasi

- Chaouacha
- Chitimacha
- Choctaw
- Houma
- Koasati
- Mosopelea
- Mougoulacha
- Natchez
- Okelousa
- Opelousa
- Quinipissa
- Taensa
- Talapoosa
- Tangipahoa
- Tunica
- Xanna

== State-recognized tribes ==
The Louisiana Office of Indian Affairs oversees state–tribal relations. They work with 11 state-recognized tribes, that are as follows.

1. Addai Caddo Tribe, Robeline, LA
2. Bayou Lafourche Band of the Biloxi-Chitimacha Confederation of Muskogees, Denham Springs, LA
3. Choctaw-Apache Community of Ebarb, Zwolle, LA
4. Clifton-Choctaw, also the Clifton Choctaw Tribe of Louisiana, Clinton, LA
5. Four Winds Tribe, Louisiana Cherokee Confederacy
6. Grand Caillou/Dulac Band of the Biloxi-Chitimacha Confederation of Muskogees
7. Isle de Jean Charles Band
8. Louisiana Choctaw Tribe
9. Natchitoches Tribe of Louisiana
10. Pointe-au-Chien Tribe
11. United Houma Nation

== Archaeological cultures ==
- Baytown culture
- Caddoan Mississippian culture
- Clovis culture
- Coles Creek culture
- Dalton tradition
- Eastern Agricultural Complex
- Fourche Maline culture
- Hopewell tradition
- Marksville culture
- Plaquemine culture
- Poverty Point culture
- Tchefuncte culture
- Troyville culture

== See also ==
- History of Louisiana
