= List of unclassified languages of North America =

A number of languages of North America are too poorly attested to classify.

== Campbell et al. (2007) ==
Lyle Campbell et al. (2007) list the following extinct and nearly unattested language varieties of North America as unclassifiable due to lack of data.

- Eyeish
- Coree
- Sewee
- Cusabo
- Shoccoree-Eno
- Pascagoula
- Quinipissa
- Opelousa
- Pedee
- Bayogoula
- Okelousa
- Congaree
- Winyaw (see Winyaw)
- Santee (see Santee tribe; distinguish Santee Sioux)
- Okchai-Chacato (see Okchai, Chatot people)
- Tequesta
- Guale
- Sanan
- Yamasee
- Akokisa
- Avoyel
- Tocobaga (see Tocobaga)
- Houma (Note: Western Muskogean language)
- Neusiok (see Neusiok people) (Note: either Algonquian or Iroquoian)
- Ubate
- Cape Fear
- Pensacola (see Pensacola people)
- Bidai
- Wateree (see Wateree people)
- Mobile
- Michigamea
- Pakana
- Saxapahaw
- Keyauwee
- Guachichil^{†}
- Suma-Jumano^{†} (see Suma & Jumanos)
- Huite^{†}
- Concho^{†}
- Jova^{†}
- Acaxee^{†} (see Acaxee)
- Xixime (Jijime)^{†}
- Zacatec^{†} (see Zacatecos; perhaps the same as Acaxee)
- Tahue^{†}
- Guasave^{†}
- Toboso^{†} (see Tobosos)

† Ethnographic evidence suggests these varieties might have been Uto-Aztecan. See Uto-Aztecan languages § Extinct languages for more.

== Others ==
Other unclassified languages of North America include:

- Chumbia language
- Guerrero Chontal language

== See also ==
- Category:Unclassified languages of North America
- List of extinct languages of North America
- List of extinct Uto-Aztecan languages
- Languages of North America
- List of unclassified languages of South America
