= Mougoulacha =

Historic Native American tribe from Louisiana, U.S.

Imongolosha

Total population
- extinct as a tribe, merged into the Houma

Regions with significant populations
- Louisiana

Languages
- Southern Muskogean language

Religion
- Indigenous religion

Related ethnic groups
- Acolapissa, Okelousa, Quinapissa, Tangipahoa

The Mougoulacha were a Native American tribe that lived near Lake Pontchartrain in Louisiana.

Some sources indicate that the Mougoulacha may have been the same tribe as the Quinipissa, Acolapissa, and the Tangipahoa. John Reed Swanton suggests that the Quinipissa merged into the surviving Mougoulacha. According to several sources related to the Houma, many tribes in the area of Lake Pontchartrain were called Mougoulacha.

== Name ==
The name Mougoulacha, also spelled Mugulasha is a simplified version of the name Imongolosha, which may translate as "People from the other side".

== Population ==
Ethnologist James Mooney estimated that the Mougoulacha, Bayagoula, and Quinipissa had a combined population of 1,500 in 1650. In 1699 Iberville said that the Bayagoula and Mougoulacha together had about 180 to 250 warriors and an estimated 1,250 people.

== Language ==
The Mougoulacha language was a Southern Muskogean languages, closely related to Choctaw and Chickasaw.

== History ==
In the year 1699 Pierre Le Moyne d'Iberville journeyed to the east of the Mississippi River Delta and encountered the Mougoulacha tribe. d'Iberville was amazed that the Mougoulacha chief was wearing a blue serge coat. The chief said that the coat was given to him many years ago when Henri de Tonti explored the area. The Mougoulacha chief then showed d'Iberville a letter that was written in French. d'Ibberville determined that the letter was left by Tonti with the Quinipissa tribe fourteen years earlier. This led d'Iberville to believe that the Mougoulacha were actually the remaining members of the Quinipissa tribe.

The Bayagoula and Mougoulacha settled together in one village by 1699, but in the spring of 1700, the Bayagoula attacked and almost completely destroyed the Mougoulacha. After that, the tribe is not described again by chroniclers of the time.

== Culture ==
The tribe maintained perpetual fires burning in two village temples. The temples were the same size as their homes but decorated with animal carvings. The explorer d'Iberville said that he saw many carvings of opossums which they called choucouacha in their Native language along with offerings of deer, bear, and bison skins inside the temple. A Jesuit priest named Paul du Ru said that the Mougoulacha had two temples in each village located on opposite sides of a large plaza.
