= Languages of America =

Languages of America may refer to:

- Languages of the United States
- American language (disambiguation)
