= American language =

American language(s) may refer to:

- Languages of North America, indigenous, (former) colonial, and immigrant languages spoken in North America
  - Languages of the United States, numerous languages spoken in the US
    - American English, the most commonly used and national language of the US
- Indigenous languages of the Americas, languages spoken by indigenous peoples from North America and South America
- Languages of South America, indigenous, (former) colonial, and immigrant languages spoken in South America
- American Sign Language, the sign language of deaf communities in the US and English-speaking parts of Canada
- The American Language, a 1919 book
