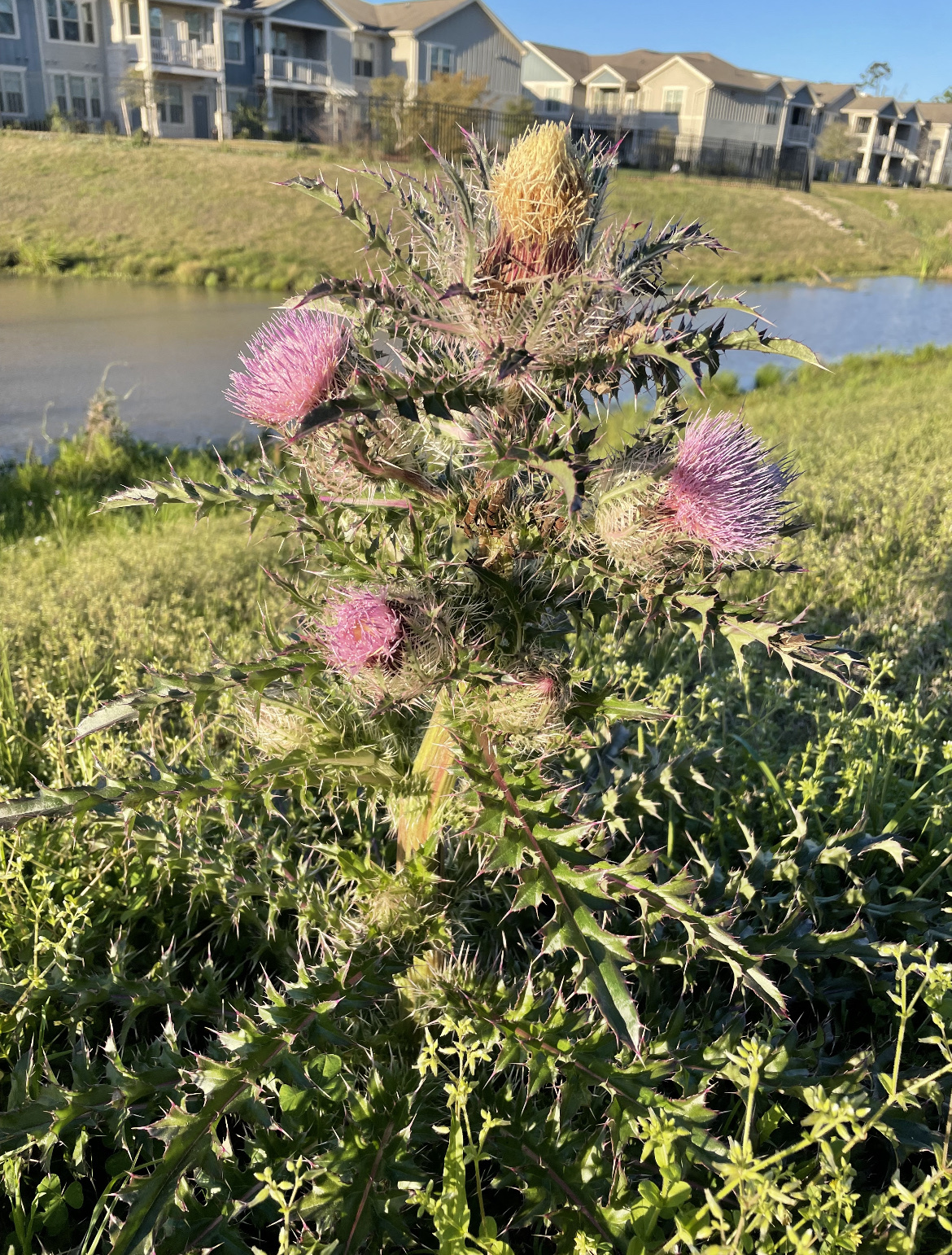

Scientific classification
- Kingdom: Plantae
- Clade: Embryophytes
- Clade: Tracheophytes
- Clade: Spermatophytes
- Clade: Angiosperms
- Clade: Eudicots
- Clade: Asterids
- Order: Asterales
- Family: Asteraceae
- Genus: Cirsium
- Species: C. horridulum

Binomial name
- Cirsium horridulum Michx.

Synonyms
- Synonymy: Carduus horridulus Pers.; Carduus pinetorum Small; Carduus spinosissimus Walter; Carduus vittatus Small, syn of var. vittatum; Cirsium chrismarii (Klatt) Petr.; Cirsium pinetorum (Small) Small 1913 not Greenm. 1905; Cirsium vittatum (Small) Small, syn of var. vittatum; Cnicus chrismarii Klatt; Cnicus horridulus (Michx.) Pursh; Cirsium megacanthum Nutt., syn of var. megacanthum; Carduus smallii (Britton) H.E.Ahles, syn of var. vittatum; Cirsium smallii Britton, syn of var. vittatum

= Cirsium horridulum =

Species of thistle

Cirsium horridulum, called bristly thistle, purple thistle, or yellow thistle is a North American species of plants in the tribe Cardueae within the family Asteraceae. It is an annual or biennial.100 The species is native to the eastern and southern United States from New England to Florida, Texas, and Oklahoma as well as to Mexico, Belize, Guatemala, Honduras, and the Bahamas.

Thomas Nuttall (1786–1859) described var. megacanthum as "one of the most terribly armed plants in the genus."

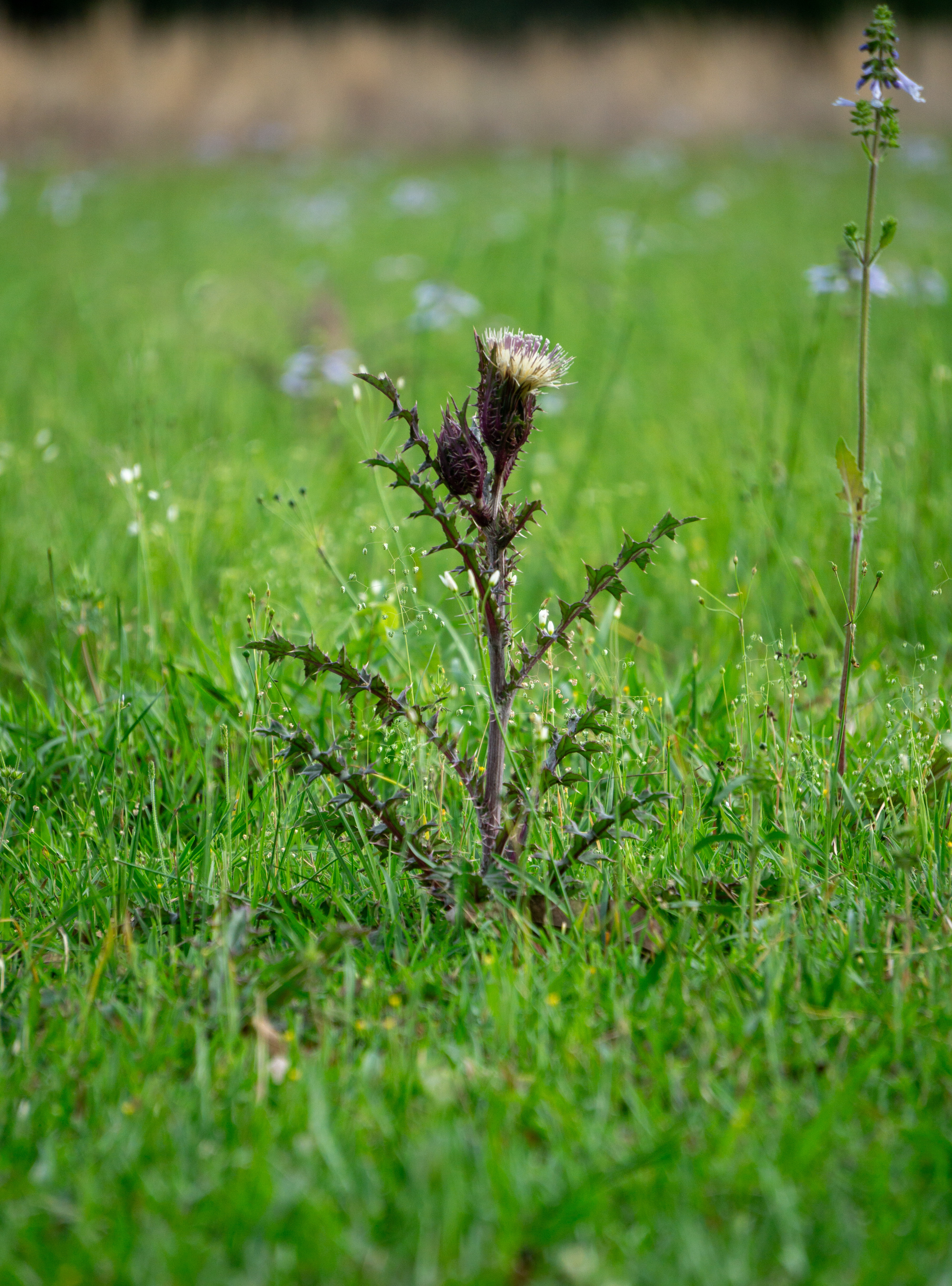
Early Flowering Stage

== Description ==
Cirsium horridulum is a biennial herb up to 2.5 meters (8 ft) tall, with a large taproot and fleshy side roots that sometimes sprout new shoots. Leaves are up to 40 centimeters (16 in) long with thick, sharp spines along the edges. There are usually several flower heads, also with sharp spines, each head with disc florets but no ray florets. Flower color varies from one plant to the next: white, yellow, pink, red or purple.

Varieties

- Cirsium horridulum var. horridulum – from Maine to Guatemala
- Cirsium horridulum var. megacanthum (Nutt.) D.J.Keil – from the Florida Panhandle to Texas and Oklahoma
- Cirsium horridulum var. vittatum (Small) R.W.Long – from North Carolina to Louisiana

== Conservation status in the United States ==
It is endangered in Connecticut, New Hampshire, and Pennsylvania. It is listed as threatened in Rhode Island.

== As a noxious weed ==
The Cirsium genus is listed as a noxious weed in Arkansas and Iowa.

== Native American ethnobotany ==
The Houma people make an infusion of the leaves and root of the plant in whiskey. They use it as both as an astringent, and drink it to clear phlegm from lungs and throat. They also eat the tender, white hearts of the plant raw. The Seminole use the spines of the plant as darts for their blowguns.

== Ecology ==
C. horridulum is a facultative upland species that can grow in wetlands, but is usually found in non-wetland ecosystems. Its seeds are cypsela that are dispersed by birds and wind.

It is a larval host to the little metalmark and the painted lady butterflies. Its flowers are popular for their nectar and pollen with butterflies and bumble bees.

The leaf epidermis is enclosed by both an inner and outer cuticle, which helps minimize the risk of pathogens entering the plant.

Cirsium horridulum is insect pollinated and is recorded to have been visited in northern Florida by Agapostemon splendens, Ceratina, Eucera dubitata, and Lasioglossum reticulatum.
