= Quide =

The Quide were a band of Native Americans, friends of the Jumano, in the area around what is now Texas. In 1683, Juan Sabeata reported them as desiring missionaries. They are recorded as having lived three days' travel east of the mouth of the Concho River.

== See also ==
"Quide Indians" in the Handbook of Texas Online
