= Acolapissa =

Historical Native American tribe

Háklo-pisa

Total population
- extinct as a tribe, merged into the Houma people in the 18th century

Regions with significant populations
- Mississippi, Louisiana

Languages
- Acolapissa language

Religion
- Indigenous religion

Related ethnic groups
- Bayogoula, Houma, Natchitoches
- Swanton 281, 284

The Acolapissa were a small tribe of Indigenous peoples of the Southeastern Woodlands of North America. They lived along the banks of the Pearl River, between present-day Louisiana and Mississippi. They are believed to have spoken a Muskogean language, closely related to the Choctaw and Chickasaw spoken by other Southeast tribes of the Muskogean family.

== Name ==
The name Acolapissa is likely an anglization of háklo-pisa, meaning "those who listen and see", or okla pisa, meaning "those who look out for people", according to anthropologist John Reed Swanton.

== Early history ==
=== 17th century ===
The Acolapissa had at least six villages. Pierre Le Moyne d'Iberville claimed that the Tangipahoa settlement was an additional Acolapissan settlement. In 1699, a band of 200 Chickasaw, led by two English slave traders, attacked several Acolapissa villages, intending to take captives as slaves to be sold in Charleston, South Carolina.

=== 18th century ===
Around 1702, the Acolapissa moved from Pearl River and settled on a bayou on the north side of Lake Pontchartrain. Shortly afterward, Louis Juchereau de St. Denis sent the Natchitoches tribe to live with the Acolapissa, who welcomed them and allowed them to settle close to their own village. After that time, in the year 1722 they moved farther west, into the area around the future New Orleans along the Mississippi River. Pressured by French settlement in the area and suffering high mortality from new infectious diseases carried by the Europeans, the Acolapissa tribe eventually merged with the Bayogoula. By the year 1739, these remnants were absorbed into the Houma people and ceased to exist separately as tribes. Their descendants intermarried.

== Population ==
Pierre Le Moyne d'Iberville wrote that in the year 1699 the population of the Acolapissa consisted of 250 families and around 150 men. However the research by anthropologist James Mooney in the 20th century determined that a more accurate count was proposed by Jean-Baptiste Bénard de la Harpe, who found that the tribe population was around 1,500 people. In 1722, Father Pierre François Xavier de Charlevoix wrote that the Acolapissa tribe had 200 warriors.

== Etymology and spelling ==
According to Allen Wright, the word Acolapissa (okla pisa) means "those who look out for people" in the Choctaw language, one of the Muskogean languages. Other spelling versions of the tribe's name included: Aquelou pissas (a French transliteration), Quinipissa, Cenepisa, Colapissa, Coulapissa, Equinipicha, Kinipissa, Kolapissa, and Mouisa.

== Culture ==
The Acolapissa adorned their bodies with tattoos. Given the warm and humid climate, they wore very little clothing. They built dwellings from local resources, with reed and thatch roofs.

Some sources indicate that the Acolapissa may have been the same tribe as the Quinipissa or the Tangipahoa. According to several sources related to the Houma, several tribes in the area of Lake Pontchartrain were called Mougoulacha.

== Language ==
Acolapissa
- Native to: United States
- Region: Pearl River
- Ethnicity: Acolapissa
- Extinct: 18th century
- Language family: Muskogean: Western; Acolapissa

Language codes
- ISO 639-3: –

The Acolapissa language was one of the Muskogean languages and was closely related to the Choctaw and Chickasaw.

== Today ==
The tribe is classified as extinct.
