= Anxau =

Extinct North American Indigenous people

Total population
- extinct by the 18th century

Regions with significant populations
- Southeastern Texas, U.S.

Languages
- Coahuilteco variant

Religion
- Indigenous religion

Related ethnic groups
- Coahuiltecan, Pampopa, Payaya

The Anxau people (sometimes spelled "Xauno" and "Xana") were a hunter-gatherer tribe of Coahuiltecan people. They lived south of present-day San Antonio, Texas, mostly near the Medina River between present-day Medina and Bexar counties.

The Anxau are believed to have been affiliated with the Pastia people.

== History ==
=== 17th century ===
In 1690, early Spanish explorers and missionaries (including Damián Massanet) encountered a number of ethnically distinct bands of aboriginal peoples near the Medina River who spoke a common Coahuiltecan dialect. These tribes also shared similar societal values and traditions. This group included the Anxau, Pampopa, Pastia, Payaya, and others.

=== 18th century ===
The Anxau people were extinct by the 18th century.

== Legacy ==
The tribe was cited in an archaeological survey of the land of Lackland Air Force Base.

In 2010, a sculpture unveiled at the Texas State Capitol included the Anxau among a list of extinct tribes.
