= Quinipissa =

Historic Native American tribe from Louisiana, U.S.

Total population
- extinct as a tribe, merged into the Mugulasha

Regions with significant populations
- Louisiana

Languages
- Southern Muskogean language

Religion
- Indigenous religion

Related ethnic groups
- Acolapissa, Okelousa, Quinapissa, Tangipahoa

The Quinipissa (sometimes spelled Kinipissa in French sources) were an Indigenous people of the Southeastern Woodlands who were living on the lower Mississippi River, in present-day Louisiana, as reported by René-Robert Cavelier, Sieur de La Salle in 1682.

In 1682, La Salle encountered a group of Quinipissa living with the Koroa in a village on the western bank of the Mississippi River.

The Quinipissa joined the Mougoulacha. The combined group shared a village with the Bayagoula. In 1700, the Bayagoula massacred both the Quinipissa and Mougoulacha, and they were not mentioned again by chroniclers of the time.

== Language ==
Quinipissa
- Region: Louisiana
- Extinct: 1700
- Language family: unclassified (Bayagoula?)

Language codes
- ISO 639-3: None (mis)
- Linguist List: 093
- Glottolog: None

The Quinipissa may have spoken the same language as the Mougoulacha and Bayagoula. The Bayagoula language is only attested with a single word.

Albert Gatschet considered Quinipissa a Muskogean language Coast Choctaw ("Coast Chaʼhta") based on evidence that many peoples of this area spoke the lingua franca Mobilian Jargon and have names that appear to be exonyms of Mobilian Jargon or Muskogean origin. This is repeated by John W. Powell and John Swanton. However, a map by Nicolas de Fer states that all nations of this region spoke different languages and barely understood each other. Thus, there is no real linguistic evidence to conclude that the Quinipissa are Muskogean.

== Bibliography ==
- de Fer, Nicolas. (1701). Les costes aux environs de la Riviere de Misisipi, decouverte par Mr. de la Salle en 1683, et reconnues par Mr. le chevallier d'Yberville en 1698 et 1699.
- Gatschet, Albert S. (1884). A migration legend of the Creek Indians (Vol. 1). Philadelphia: D. G. Brinton.
- Goddard, Ives. (2005). The indigenous languages of the Southeast. Anthropological Linguistics, 47 (1), 1-60.
- Margry, Pierre (Ed.). (1876-1886). Découvertes et établissements des Français dans l'ouest et dans le sud de l'Amérique septentrionale (1614-1754) (Vols. 1–6). Paris: D. Jouaust.
- Powell, John W. (1891). Indian linguistic families of America north of Mexico. Bureau of American Ethnology annual report (No. 7, pp. 1–142). Washington, D.C.: Government Printing Office.
- Swanton, John R. (1911). Indian tribes of the lower Mississippi Valley and adjacent coast of the Gulf of Mexico. Bureau of American Ethnology bulletin (No. 43). Washington, D.C.: Government Printing Office.
