= Chaouacha =

Extinct Native American tribe of Louisiana

Total population
- Extinct as a tribe (after 1802)

Regions with significant populations
- Louisiana

Languages
- possibly dialect of Chitimacha

Religion
- Indigenous religion

Related ethnic groups
- Chitimacha

The Chaouacha (or Chawasha) were an Indigenous people of Louisiana. They were likely related to the Chitimacha.

The French massacred many of them in retaliation for the Natchez revolt against French colonists in which they had had no part.

== History ==
=== 17th century ===
When first written about, they lived on the west bank of the Mississippi River, just south of New Orleans. In 1699, they were reported to be allied with the Ouacha (or Washa), the Okelousa, and the Opelousa.

=== 18th century ===
In December 1729, following an attack by the Natchez on Fort Rosalie the prior month, French colonists feared a widespread Indian rebellion or a combined revolt by Native Americans and enslaved people. The governor of Louisiana, Étienne Perier, ordered a force of 80 enslaved Africans under the command of Louis Tixerant, a Company of the Indies warehouse keeper, to massacre the Chaouacha community, rewarding the men by freeing them from slavery. The French killed at least seven Chaouacha men and kidnapped women and children whom they took to New Orleans. Survivors from the tribe petitioned Perier to release the prisoners, as the tribe was not involved in the Natchez revolt, which he did. The Choctaw, French allies against the Natchez, objected to Perier's attack on the Chaouacha and encouraged other small tribes in the region to relocate away from the French to lands under Choctaw protection.

Perier reported to his superiors that he had destroyed the Chaouacha, but evidence suggests the tribe remained distinct until the late 18th-century before assimilating into other tribes.

=== 19th century ===
An 1802 mention by French colonist Baudry de Lozières describes them as "Tchaouachas: Reduced to 40 warriors. A wandering indolent and lazy nation, settled near the French in 1712. Corn is the only assistance one can expect of them."
