= Languages of North America =

The languages of North America reflect not only that continent's indigenous peoples, but the European colonization as well. The most widely spoken languages in North America (which includes Central America and the Caribbean islands) are English, Spanish, and to a lesser extent French, and especially in the Caribbean, creole languages lexified by them.

== Indigenous languages ==
North America is home to many language families and some language isolates. In the Arctic north, the Eskimo–Aleut languages are spoken from Alaska to Greenland. This group includes the Aleut language of the Aleutian Islands, the Yupik languages of Alaska and the Russian Far East, and the Inuit languages of Alaska, Yukon, the Northwest Territories, Nunavut, and Greenland.

The Na-Dené languages, of which the most numerous and widespread are the Athabaskan languages, include the languages of central and eastern Alaska and northwestern Canada, as well as the Apachean languages of the Southwestern United States. The Algic languages, including the large Algonquian branch, are widespread across Canada and the United States; they include Cree, Anishinaabe (Ojibwe), Mi'kmaq, and Blackfoot. The Iroquoian languages dominate the area around the Saint Lawrence River and the eastern Great Lakes, but also include Cherokee. The Siouan–Catawban languages, including Crow and Sioux, dominate the Great Plains. Many small language families are spoken in the Pacific Northwest from British Columbia to California.

The Uto-Aztecan languages are found throughout the Western United States, northern and central Mexico, and as far south as El Salvador; they include Hopi, O'odham, and Nahuatl (descended from Aztec). Other large families in Mexico include the Mayan languages (also spoken in Belize and Guatemala), the Mixe–Zoque languages, and the Oto-Manguean languages. In the Caribbean, the Arawakan languages were formerly widespread, but are now limited to Garifuna on the Central American mainland; the family is still well represented in South America, however. The Chibchan languages are spoken in Costa Rica and Panama as well as South America.

== Introduced languages ==
The most widely spoken language in North America is English, followed by Spanish, and then French. These three languages were brought to North America as a result of the colonization of essentially the entire continent by settlers from Europe.

English is the predominant language of the United States, most provinces of Canada, and of Bermuda and the Cayman Islands; it is spoken alongside English-based creole languages in Anguilla, Antigua and Barbuda, the Bahamas, Barbados, Belize, Grenada, Jamaica, Montserrat, Saint Kitts and Nevis, Saint Vincent and the Grenadines, Trinidad and Tobago, the Turks and Caicos Islands, and the Virgin Islands. In addition, it is the official language of Dominica and Saint Lucia, where the French-based Antillean Creole is also widely spoken.

Spanish is the dominant language in Mexico and all of Central America apart from Belize, as well as the Caribbean nations of Cuba and the Dominican Republic, and also in the U.S. commonwealth of Puerto Rico (where English is spoken as well); it is also widely spoken in the United States.

French is the dominant language in Quebec and Saint Pierre and Miquelon, and is spoken in Manitoba, Prince Edward Island, Ontario, New Brunswick, Nova Scotia, Maine, New Hampshire, Vermont, and Louisiana. It is spoken alongside French-based creole languages in Saint Lucia, Dominica, Guadeloupe, Haiti, Martinique, Saint Barthélemy, and the French side of Saint Martin. French is one of the two official and national languages of Canada.

Russian was once widely spoken in Alaska as it was the language of administration, commerce, and the settlers there that often intermarried with the locals (they numbered no more than a thousand), creating a sizable biracial population. The language began to decline after the United States purchased the land from the Russian Empire in 1867. Nonetheless, the language, called "Old Russian" by its speakers, is still spoken today in parts of Alaska like Ninilchik and Kodiak by descendants of Russian colonists and Russified Alaskan Natives and is known for its archaic Russian vocabulary and indigenous influences, though the vast majority of speakers are elderly, so that this unique Russian dialect is heavily endangered. In addition, a Russian creole/mixed language known as Medny Aleut language was once spoken in some of the Aleutian Islands. Only a few elderly people still speak it. There has also been sizable recent immigration from Russia in the past few decades, leading to a new generation of Russian-speaking Alaskans. Other Slavic languages brought to the continent by North American settlers include the Canadian Ukrainian and Texas Silesian dialects.

Though no German state played a major role in the European colonization of the Americas, German people did found their own colonies. Pennsylvania Dutch, Hutterite German, Texas German, all of which developed in North America, as well as Plautdietsch are spoken by descendants of these settlers in the United States, Canada, and Mexico.

Other introduced languages include Danish in Greenland, where it is spoken by nearly everyone (mostly as a second language) due to centuries of colonization by Denmark. Danish was once the language of administration of the US Virgin Islands before the purchase by the United States. Dutch in Aruba and the Netherlands Antilles, where it is spoken alongside the Portuguese Creole language in Papiamento. In modern times North America has immigrant speakers of many languages from around the world. For details see Languages of Canada, Languages of the United States, and Languages of Mexico. Some historic languages include Gholan Language and Quechua.

Yiddish, another Germanic language with Aramaic and Hebrew words and Slavic influence, is spoken by Jewish Hassidic and Orthodox communities and in some families from Jewish extraction in many parts of America and in the US, and Canada.

Many Christian communities from the Middle East speak Neo-Aramaic in many cities in the States and Canada.

Indians were brought to the Caribbean from South Asia during the mid-19th century to the early 20th century to work on the sugar cane, cocoa bean, rice and coffee bean plantations after slavery was abolished. Caribbean Hindustani is spoken by Indo-Caribbeans in islands in the Caribbean like Trinidad and Tobago and Jamaica where a majority of the Indians are North Indian. Tamil and Telugu was spoken as the lingua franca of Indians in islands like Martinique and Guadeloupe, where the majority of Indians are Dravidians (South Indians). Recent immigration beginning in the 1960s from India to Canada and the United States has increased the prevalence of Indian languages in those countries, with Punjabi once had the highest ranking in Canada among Indian languages, being the third most-spoken language by the 2011 Canadian census. But now in the most recent 2016 census, Punjabi has been superseded by Mandarin and Cantonese to be the fifth. Today, Hindi, Urdu, and other South Asian languages are also spoken throughout North America.

Canadian Gaelic is an endangered dialect of Scottish Gaelic spoken by the descendants of Scottish Highlander settlers in Nova Scotia.

== See also ==
- Anglo-America
- Canadian French
- Caribbean Spanish
- Caribbean Hindustani
- Central American Spanish
- French language in the United States
- German in North America
- Languages of the Caribbean
- List of extinct languages of North America
- List of unclassified languages of North America
- Mexican Spanish
- North American English
- Spanish language in the United States
- Latin America
