= Bayogoula =

Historic Native American tribe from Louisiana, U.S.

Total population
- extinct as a tribe, merged into the Houma

Regions with significant populations
- Louisiana

Languages
- Southern Muskogean language

Religion
- Indigenous religion

The Bayogoula (also known as the Bayagoula, Bayagola, or Bayugla) were a Native American tribe from Louisiana in the southern United States.

John Reed Swanton translated the name ⟨Bayogoula⟩ to mean "bayou people" and wrote that they lived near Bayou Goula in Iberville Parish, Louisiana. Their name has been written as ⟨Bayou Goula⟩.

== Language ==
The Bayogoula language is undocumented and hence also unclassified. They may have spoken a Southern Muskogean language, related to the Choctaw language and Houma language.

== History ==
=== 17th century ===
Ethnologist James Mooney estimated that the Bayagoula, Quinipissa, and Mugulasha had a combined population of 1,500 in 1650. In 1699, the Bayagoula were one of the first tribes in Louisiana to meet French colonist Pierre Le Moyne d'Iberville. They shared a village with the Mugulasha, a related tribe. The Houma attacked them that winter, and next spring in 1700, the Bayagoula attacked and destroyed the Mugulasha.

=== 18th century ===
In 1706, Taensa refugees who had settled with the Bayogoula attacked them. Surviving Bayogoula settled near New Orleans and then moved to Ascension Parish. In 1715, they had an estimated 40 warriors. By 1739, they settled in between the Houma and Acolapissa.

The Tunica tribe moved into the community soon thereafter. In 1706, the Tunica ambushed the Bayagoula and almost killed all of them. By 1721, the rest of the tribe had suffered many deaths from smallpox, a new infectious disease carried by the French and other Europeans, among whom it was endemic. The remaining Bayagoula are believed to have moved to the area of the present-day Ascension Parish of Louisiana. Some likely joined nearby villages of the Houma and Acolapissa who lived in the area, whilst others likely intermarried with neighboring French, Spanish, and German colonists.
