= Nicolas de la Salle =

American politician (died 1710)

Nicolas de la Salle (died 31 December 1710) was the first commissary appointed by the French King in the colony of Louisiana. He was the adversary of Jean-Baptiste Le Moyne de Bienville and eventually responsible for his removal from the office of governor.

La Salle was part of the René-Robert Cavelier, Sieur de La Salle expedition of 1682, in which all of the Mississippi basin was claimed for France.

He was also the brother-in-law of René-Robert Cavelier, as Nicolas married Robert's sister.
