= Mardi Gras Act of 1875 =

Legislation creating a legal holiday in Louisiana

In 1875, the Louisiana State Legislature declared Mardi Gras a legal holiday in the state of Louisiana. The holiday is observed on the day before Ash Wednesday (also known as Fat Tuesday).

Establishing the state holiday made it possible for people to celebrate Mardi Gras legally, including suspending laws against concealing one's identity with a mask for the day, though it continues to be illegal on every other day of the year. Critics maintain that this holiday has facilitated anonymity which has led to unabashed drunkenness, drug abuse, violence against individuals and businesses, and other criminal activity.

== History ==
Mardi Gras is the celebration before Lent – a period in which people of some Christian denominations fast, give up other delicacies, or both – where people traditionally eat a large meal before the fasting period, hence the name translating to "Fat Tuesday."

The history of Mardi Gras in the United States started with Pierre Le Moyne d'Iberville's defense of the Louisiane territory (modern-day Alabama, Mississippi, Louisiana, and parts Texas.) He and his men settled a camp around 60 miles away from present-day New Orleans on Mardi Gras in 1699. They named it "Pointe du Mardi Gras", (Mardi Gras Point), accordingly. They also held a small gala in celebration, making it the first Mardi Gras in North America.

=== French rule ===
Both free and enslaved people in the French territory of Louisiana were recorded as having celebrated Mardi Gras as early as 1732. Balls were a prominent aspect of these early Mardi Gras celebrations; then governor of Louisiana, Pierre de Rigaud, marquis de Vaudreuil-Cavagnial, held several in his home that set the stage for future upper-class celebrations. Congo Square became a place where freemen and slaves congregated and also began to practice Mardi Gras celebrations, open and freely.

=== Spanish rule ===
After the French-Indian War Louisiana was ceded to Spain in the Treaty of Paris of 1763. With this change in leadership over the region, Mardi Gras celebration began to be put to a halt. People of color were prohibited from wearing masks, feathers, and attending night time balls, all actions indicative of Mardi Gras celebrations. They continued to form organizations in which they celebrated, however. The high society balls that used to be held in French Louisiana were also put to a stop in this time period. This is when Mardi Gras celebrations began to be seen in a negative light in North America, which eventually led to the Mardi Gras Act of 1875.

=== American rule ===
The Louisiana purchase granted a total of around 827,000 square miles of land to the United States for around 15 million dollars. Taking place in 1803, ownership of the land around New Orleans had changed three times within a 105-year time span. Under early American rule, rules implemented by the Spanish continued to be upheld, like banning masked balls and public disguises. After a major slave revolt in 1811, and the rise of a popular belief that spies for Aaron Burr were using masks as disguises, regulations got more intense. Because of these regulations, people of color (both of African and Native American descent) began to form Krewes in which they would organize their own celebrations (they are still in operation and help to organize the parade and other celebrations today). As time went on, Creoles and other members of the New Orleans community were able to convince the American Government to reinstate the balls in 1823 and later in 1827 make masking on the street legal. In 1841, the first formal parade in celebration of Mardi Gras was held. During the Civil War float building was prohibited, but people continued to march on foot in celebration. Finally, with the passing of this act, Mardi Gras became a legal holiday in the state of Louisiana.
