= Xanna =

Historical Indigenous people of Texas and Louisiana, U.S.

Total population
- extinct as a tribe

Regions with significant populations
- Eastern Texas and Western Louisiana, U.S.

Languages
- unattested

Religion
- Indigenous religion

The Xanna were a historical Native American tribe from East Texas and West Louisiana. They lived southeast of the Hasinai, a band of the Caddo Confederacy.

In 1691, the Spanish established a Spanish mission in their region.

Tribes that neighbored the Xanna in the late 17th century included the Canonidiba, Casiba, Dico, Vinta, Tobo, Caquixadoquix, Conanonizachitous, and Zanomi. They were all allies of the Tejas band of the Asinai Confederacy, part of the Caddo Confederacy.

== See also ==
- Native American tribes in Texas
