= Troyville Earthworks =

Native American site in Louisiana

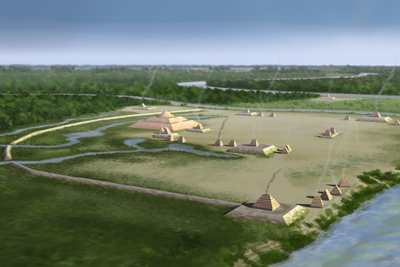
- Artists conception of Troyville Earthworks

- Location within Louisiana today
- 31°37′36.59″N 91°48′56.12″W
- Cultures: Baytown culture, Troyville culture-Coles Creek culture
- Location: Catahoula Parish, Louisiana, United States
- Region: Catahoula Parish, Louisiana

History
- Built: 100 BCE
- Abandoned: 1100 CE

Site notes
- Architectural styles: platform mounds, plaza
- Excavation dates: 1931-1932,
- Archaeologists: Winslow Walker

Troyville Earthworks (16 CT 7) is a Woodland period Native American archaeological site with components dating from 100 BCE to 700 CE during the Baytown to the Troyville-Coles Creek periods. It once had the tallest mound in Louisiana at 82 feet (25 m) in height. It is located in Catahoula Parish, Louisiana in the town of Jonesville. The site is the type site for the Troyville culture of the lower Ouachita and Tensas River valleys. Before it was destroyed for bridge approach fill in 1931, the main mound at Troyville was one of the tallest in North America.

== Site description ==
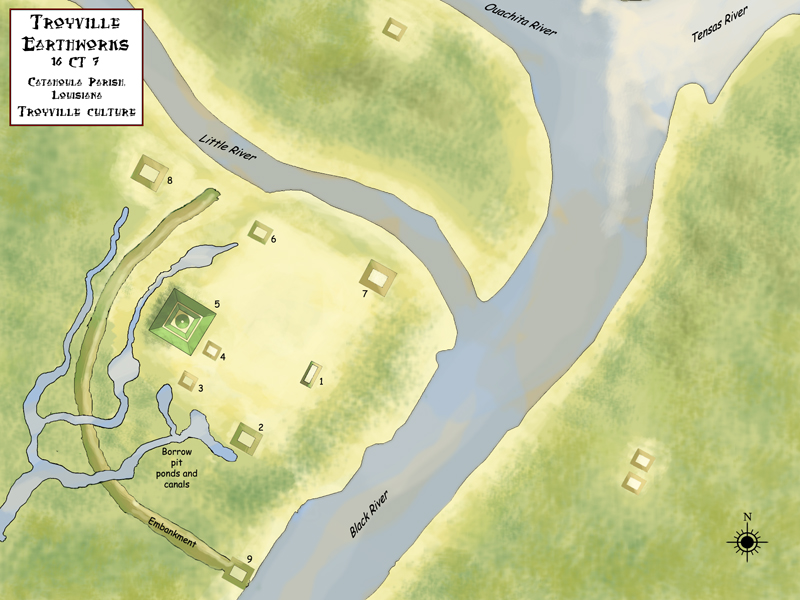
Layout of the site

The site is at the confluence of the Tensas, Ouachita, and Little Rivers. It had nine platform mounds and a perimeter embankment that were built before 700 CE. A historian, John W. Monette, in 1844 described the complex as occupying close to 400 acres and noted the existence of twelve small mounds and one large one. The embankment was started during the Middle Baytown period, with periodic repair work taking place during the Late Baytown period. The largest mound, Mound 5 ( also known as the "Great Mound" ), was 82 feet (25 m) in height. It was the tallest precolumbian mound in Louisiana and the second tallest in North America. Its base covered an acre of ground and had three levels, the bottom two rectangular and the third on the top a truncated conical mound. Monette described the lower level of Mound 5 as being 300 feet (91 m) by 150 feet (46 m) at its base and rising to the height of 30 feet (9.1 m). He described the conical mound at the top as 30 feet (9.1 m). Measurements for the smaller mounds at the site were about 12 feet (3.7 m) to 20 feet (6.1 m) in height with bases measuring 150 feet (46 m) by 60 feet (18 m). Four of the mounds were surrounded on the southern and western side of the plaza by the embankment, which measured 10 feet (3.0 m) in height, 10 feet (3.0 m) in width and 100 feet (30 m) across.

By the time of the American Civil War, the mound had been reduced in size to 50 feet (15 m) in height. During the Civil War, the mound was reduced even further when some of its fill was removed to construct Confederate rifle pits. In 1871 the town of Jonesville was founded on the site and more of Mound A's fill was used to fill ditches (borrow pits created by the removal of earth to construct the mounds themselves) and level the land as the town grew. The townspeople frequently camped out on the mounds during flooding.

In 1883 the site was visited by the prominent ethnologist Cyrus Thomas, who described the group as then consisting of six mounds within an embankment, with some of the smaller mounds having been largely destroyed. One had been turned into a modern cemetery, which can still be seen today on the grounds of the local Methodist Church. The Great Mound had also been reduced, by this time it was only 45 feet (14 m) in height, 270 feet (82 m) in length and 180 feet (55 m) in width. In 1931 the mound was drastically reduced in size, the majority of its remaining mass being used as fill for a nearby bridge approach. Today the mound is only 3 feet (0.91 m) in height.

== Excavations ==
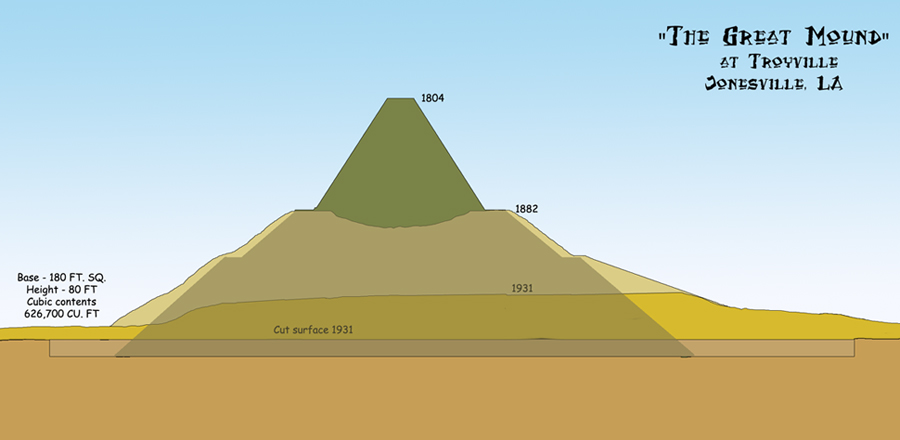
Different heights and profiles of Mound 5

The site takes its name from the Troy Plantation, which was part of a Spanish land grant of 1,000 acres made to John Hebrard in 1786. William Dunbar was the first European to make note of the mound site in his report to Thomas Jefferson for the Red River expedition of 1804. It is the first written description of an archaeological site in Louisiana.

In 1931 and 1932 the Smithsonian archaeologist Winslow Walker excavated parts of the site. He found woven cane matting, palmetto fronds, and wooden planks within the mound, materials used by the Native Americans as part of the complex engineering to build the large structure. These materials had been used to construct a "cane dome", which had been layered like an onion by alternating layers of split cane and mound fill to strengthen the structure. The builders also used different colors of dirt, including blue clays and red clays. Walker also discovered a log palisade and steps made of tree trunks up one corner of the mound. He published a 103-page booklet on his work.

In the late 2000s parts of the site were being investigated for purchase by The Archaeological Conservancy, a nonprofit organization that plans to protect the site from future degradation. The Conservancy purchased the site of Mound 4 and the old house located on the property was demolished. The Conservancy plans to landscape and fence the site and use it as a research preserve.

== See also ==
- Monks Mound
- Culture, phase, and chronological table for the Mississippi Valley
