= Tangipahoa =

Native American tribe

The Tangipahoa were a Native American tribe that lived just north of Lake Pontchartrain and between the Pearl River and the Mississippi River.

== Etymology ==
The name Tangipahoa is derived from the Muskogean words (tonche pahoha) which translates to "corncob people" or "people of the corn" or "corncob". It is from this Native American tribe that the modern Tangipahoa Parish gets its name, as well as the Tangipahoa River and the village of Tangipahoa.

== Population ==
Pierre Le Moyne d'Iberville wrote that in the year 1650 the population of both the Acolapissa and Tangipahoa combined consisted of 250 families and around 150 men. However the research by James Mooney determined that a more accurate count was proposed by Jean-Baptiste Bénard de la Harpe when he found that the tribe population was around 1500 people.

== Language ==
The Tangipahoa language was closely related to Choctaw and Chickasaw, which are both Muskogean languages.

== History ==
On March 31, 1682, Henri de Tonti on a journey with René-Robert Cavelier, Sieur de La Salle wrote that they camped at Maheoula, a Tangipahoa settlement. Pierre Le Moyne d'Iberville claimed that the Tangipahoa settlement was an Acolapissa settlement and that they were of the same tribe. The Tangipahoa settlement was destroyed sometime in the 17th century. When La Salle reached the village he said he saw that it was burned and that there were bodies laying in the village. La Salle wrote that when he asked the Bayogoula tribe what had happened they claimed that the Tangipahoa village was destroyed by the Houma people. The remaining Tangipahoa tribe members are believed to have reunited with the Acolapissa and eventually merged with the Bayogoula and then the Houma.
