= Fourche Maline culture =

Woodland Period Native American culture

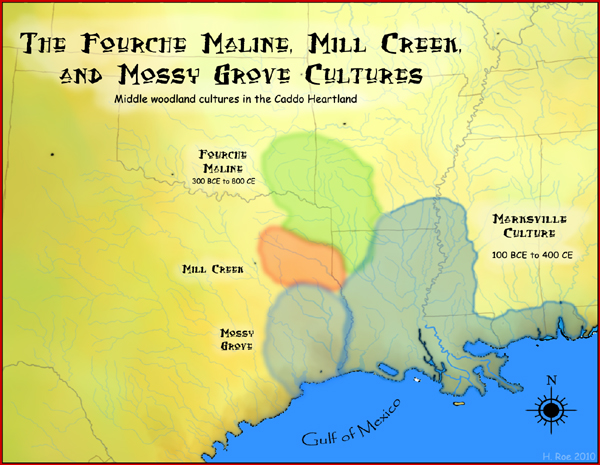
Map of the Fourche Maline, Mill Creek, Marksville, and Mossy Grove cultures

The Fourche Maline culture (pronounced foosh-ma-lean) (Note: Oklahoma Historian Muriel Wright translated the French name as meaning "treacherous fork" in English.) was a Woodland Period Native American culture that existed from 300 BCE to 800 CE, in what are now defined as southeastern Oklahoma, southwestern Arkansas, northwestern Louisiana, and northeastern Texas. They are considered to be one of the main ancestral groups of the Caddoan Mississippian culture, along with the contemporaneous Mill Creek culture of eastern Texas. This culture was named for the Fourche Maline Creek, a tributary of the Poteau River. (Note: The stream name often appears in print as Fourche Marine River, Fourche Marine Creek, and simply Fourche Maline.) Their modern descendants are the Caddo Nation of Oklahoma.

== Description ==
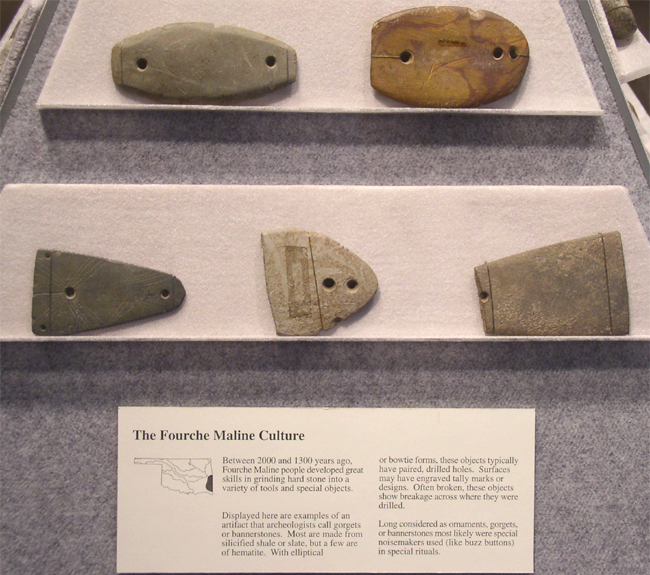
Fourche Maline culture gorgets and bannerstones

In the late 1930s archeologists with the federal Work Projects Administration excavated a series of sites in the Wister Valley of southeastern Oklahoma. The middens at these sites were unusually thick and dark, and were called "black mounds" by the excavators. They contained a blend of Archaic, Woodland, and Mississippian culture artifacts. These sites became the type sites for the Fourche Maline culture. Early during this time period, ceramic pottery had been introduced into the area, probably from Tchefuncte culture peoples to the southeast in Louisiana. The population became more sedentary and began to establish semi-permanent villages and to practice agriculture, planting various cultigens of the Eastern Agricultural Complex, including maize.

The populations began to expand, and trade with various non-local people also began to increase. Trade with people to the southwest brought the bow and arrow. Trade with the Marksville culture and other Hopewellian peoples brought exotic goods from the Gulf Coast such as fresh water pearls, sea shells, sharks' teeth, and copper from northern areas. An increase in the hierarchical structuring of the Fourche Maline society also began during this period; researchers have not determined if it arose independently or was influenced by Hopewell culture. The dead were cared for in increasingly elaborate rituals, as the first burial mounds were built at this time. Political power began to be consolidated, and the elite organized the construction of the first earthwork platform mounds at ritual centers. They were used for ceremonies and sometimes residences by the developing hereditary political and religious leadership.

Archeological excavations at McCutcheon-McLaughlin site in Latimer County, Oklahoma in the mid 1970s revealed many details about the lives and deaths of the Fourche Maline people. They were more healthy when eating the nuts, seeds, tubers, fish and game of their hunting-gathering period than were their descendants, who depended on maize cultivation, and degenerative diseases such as arthritis were less frequent. However, their lives were difficult. The most often identified cause of death among the burials excavated was warfare. Researchers found several mass graves with the bodies injured by projectile points. One specific group of nine, mostly women and children, was found showing assault by a type of chert projectile point foreign to the area. This foreign material, from the Springfield plateau of southwest Missouri and northern Arkansas, was not available to the Fourche Maline people for their own points. Archaeologists believe that a raiding party from that area may have surprised and attacked the Fourche Maline group when their warriors were away. The survivors buried their dead in a single mass grave.

It is uncertain whether the people who occupied these sites were permanent or temporary residents, but they definitely influenced later inhabitants of the Arkansas and Red River Valleys and throughout present-day Eastern Oklahoma.

== Pottery ==
Fourche Maline pottery was tempered with grog, bone, grit, and sand. Believed to have been made by the women, it is known for its distinct shape, mainly flat-based vessels with thick walls, similar to flower pots. Common varieties found in archaeological sites are Williams plain, Cooper Boneware and Ouachita plain.

== See also ==
- Hopewell tradition
