= Houma language =

Western Muskogean language

Houma
- Uma
- Native to: United States
- Region: Louisiana
- Ethnicity: Houma people
- Extinct: after 1907
- Revival: 2013
- Language family: Muskogean: Western Muskogean; Houma

Language codes
- ISO 639-3: None (mis)
- Glottolog: choc1276 Choctaw

Houma (Houma: uma) is a Western Muskogean language that was spoken in the Central and Lower Mississippi Valley by the Indigenous Houma people. There are currently no native speakers; however, efforts continue to bring the Houma language back to its people through a group of dedicated Houma persons and linguists, the Houma Language Project.

The Indigenous Houma language is thought to have fallen out of use by the late 19th century due to European-American encroachment. In 1907, John R. Swanton interviewed an elderly Houma woman to collect vocabulary from the Houma language. As a result of a language shift that began during the French colonial period and trading in Louisiana, most Houma people today speak Louisiana French, while American English is also widely used. In light of their distinct society and isolated geography, as many as 3,000 mostly elderly people living on Houma tribal lands in the Lafourche Basin are believed to be monolingual speakers of French. More recently, efforts have been made to collect vocabulary and grammar from elders to revitalize the language.

== Classification ==
Based on a list gathered by Swanton of seventy-five words and three sentences, linguists have concluded that the Houma spoke a Western Muskogean language (akin to Choctaw or Chickasaw).

== Phonology ==
The Houma Language Project reconstructs the following phoneme inventory:

=== Vowels ===
	Front			Back		
	Short	Long	Nasal	Short	Long	Nasal
High-close	i	iː	ĩ	u	uː	ũ
Mid-open	ɛ	ɛː	ɛ̃			
Low	a	aː	ã			

=== Consonants ===
		Labial	Alveolar	Palatal	Velar	Glottal
Stop	voiceless	p [p]	t [t]	tc [t͡ʃ]	k [k]	‘ [ʔ]
Stop	voiced	b [b]	d [t]			
Fricative		f [f]	s [s]	lh [θ]		h [h]
Nasal		m [m]	n [n]			
Trill						
Approximant		w [w]	l [l]	y [j]		
