= Okelousa =

Native American people in Louisiana

The Okelousa were a Native American people in Louisiana, United States. They lived west and north of Pointe Coupee Parish, Louisiana.

18th-century French explorer Jean-Baptiste Bénard de la Harpe and French ethnographer Antoine-Simon Le Page du Pratz wrote about the Okelousa, who were allied with the neighboring Washa and Chawasha peoples. They are distinct from the similarly named Opelousa.

== Language ==
They likely spoke a Muskogean language.

== Name ==
Their name comes from the Choctaw word for "black water". The name has also been written as Obquilouzas and Oqué-Loussas.

== Population ==
At the end of the 18th century, an estimated 700 Okelousa lived in 80 houses. By 1715, there were an estimated 100 to 120 combined Okelousa, Washa, and Chawasha, and 60 to 75 by 1758. American ethnographer John Reed Swanton wrote that they either ceased to exist or merged with the Houma.
