= Houma people =

Native American tribe located in Louisiana, United States

Houma
Houma
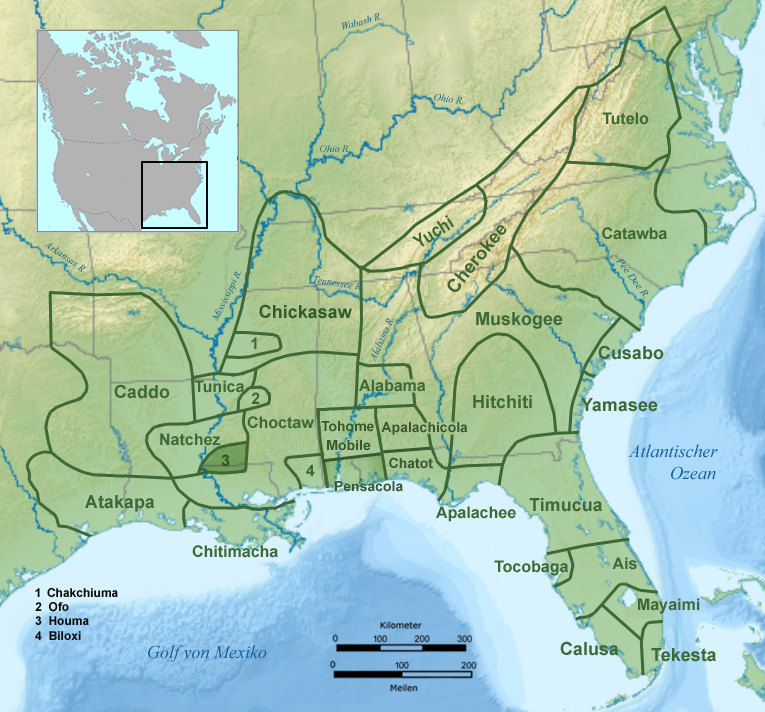
- 18th-century Houma territory

Total population
- 600–700 (1699)

Regions with significant populations
- United States (Louisiana, western Mississippi)

Languages
- originally Houma language, later French, Louisiana French, Isleño Spanish, and English

Religion
- Indigenous religion and Catholicism

Related ethnic groups
- Choctaw and other Muscogeean peoples; French Louisianians

The Houma (/ˈhoʊmə/) are a historical Native American people of Louisiana and Mississippi on the east side of the Red River of the South. They once spoke a Western Muskogean language.

== Language ==
The Houma spoke the Houma language, which is poorly attested but believed to be a Western Muskogean language. The language has been extinct since at least 1907, when anthropologist John Reed Swanton collected a list of 75 Houma words which were similar to the Choctaw language.

== Name ==
Houma, homa, or humma means "red" in Choctaw language. John Reed Swanton speculated that their name might be a shorterned version of saktci-homa meaning "red crayfish," which he thought might connect them to the Chakchiuma people.

The town of Houma was founded in 1834 and was named after the Houma tribe, which resided near the town in a settlement known as the Bayou Cane community.

== Territory ==
When French explorers first encountered the Houma in the late 17th century, they lived in what is now Wilkinson County, Mississippi, and West Feliciana Parish, Louisiana along the Red River and Mississippi River. They gradually migrated west further in to Louisiana.

== History ==
=== 17th century ===
The Houma tribe was recorded by the French explorer René-Robert Cavelier, Sieur de La Salle, in 1682 as living along the Red River on the west side of Mississippi River.

In 1682, the French explorer Nicolas de la Salle noted in his journal that he had passed near the village of the Oumas. French explorer Henri de Tonti made an alliance with the Houma in 1686. Pierre Le Moyne d'Iberville visited their settlement in 1699 and wrote a detailed account of it. The Houma welcomed him with song, smoked tobacco with him, and held a dance for him. They wore minimal clothing, primarily foot-wide belts and breechcloths, and adornments such as feathers and copper jewelry. Later French explorers estimated that about 600 to 700 Houma lived in their main village, which neighbored the Bayogoula.

By 1699–1700, the Houma tribe and the Bayougoula tribe had established a border for their hunting grounds by placing a tall red pole marked by sacred animal carcasses and feathers in the ground. Named Istrouma or Ete' Uma by those tribes and Baton Rouge by French colonizer Pierre Le Moyne d'Iberville, this marker was at a site five miles above Bayou Manchac on the Mississippi's east bank. The area developed as a trading post and the modern city of Baton Rouge, Louisiana.

=== 18th century ===
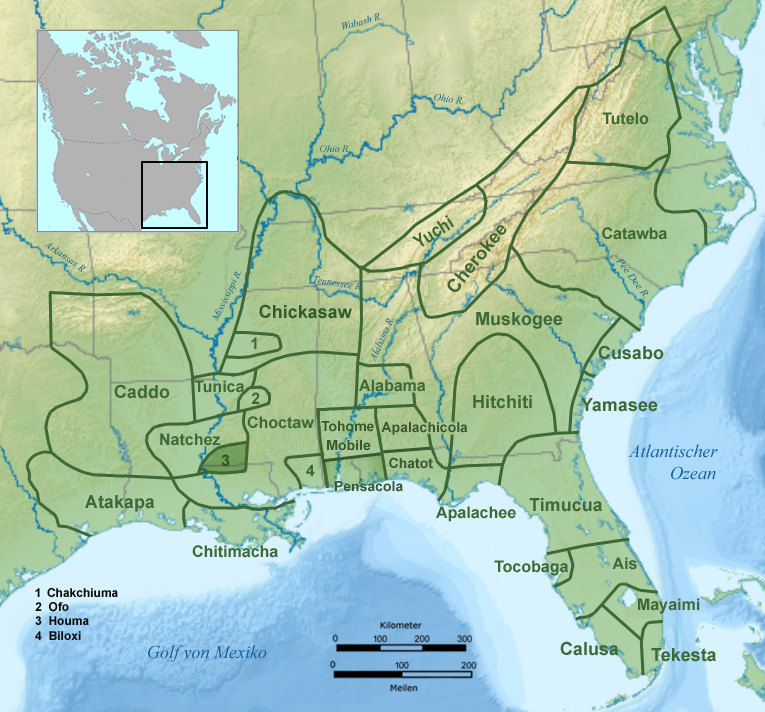
18th-century Houma territory

In 1700, Pierre Le Moyne d'Iberville returned to the Houma village and discovered that half of them had died from disease. A Jesuit priest whom the French had left with the Houma had overseen the construction of a church which was in place in 1700. The Jesuit missionary Jacques Gravier described the Houma as playing chunkey and their village as having 80 cabins. He described their temple with several carved and painted religious statues and a fire-keeper tending to the remains of a female chief. They grew abundant crops, including corn and squash, and raised chickens.

Gravier described Houma women's clothing as similar to the Tunica's, featuring a fringed skirt and robes of turkey feathers or muskrat skins. They tattooed their faces, wore their hair in braids, and blackened their teeth, as did the neighboring Tunica and Natchez people.

In either 1706 or 1709, Tunica people moved in with the Houma but then massacred them. Due to this attack, by 1709, the Houma moved to Bayou St. John and then on to Ascension Parish, Louisiana. They maintained two settlements, the smaller Little Houmas on the Mississippi River and the larger Great Houma village more than one and a half miles inland.

In 1758, French naval officer Louis Billouart wrote that the Houma population had been greatly reduced but they had about 60 fighting men. The Houma continued to live in the Great Houma village at least through 1776, when French creoles Alexander Latil and Maurice Conway bought about 81 acres of land from the Houmas. At that time, the Houma's chief was Calabe, and Bayogoula and Acolapissa refugees had joined their community.

Historian Thomas Hutchins wrote that they still lived in the same area in 1784 and had 25 warriors. Natchiabe was one of their chiefs in 1784.

=== 19th century ===
In 1803, the United States paid for French land claims in what became the United States through the Louisiana Purchase. This included Houma lands. In his An Account of Louisiana (1803), President Thomas Jefferson wrote that about 60 "Houmas or Red Men" lived 25 leagues upriver of New Orleans. In 1805, American surgeon John Sibley wrote: "There are a few of the Houmas still living on the east side of the Mississippi, in Ixusees [Ascension] Parish, below Manchack, but scarcely exist as a nation.". Sibley wrote that the Houma had intermarried with the Tunica and Atakapa.

=== 20th century ===
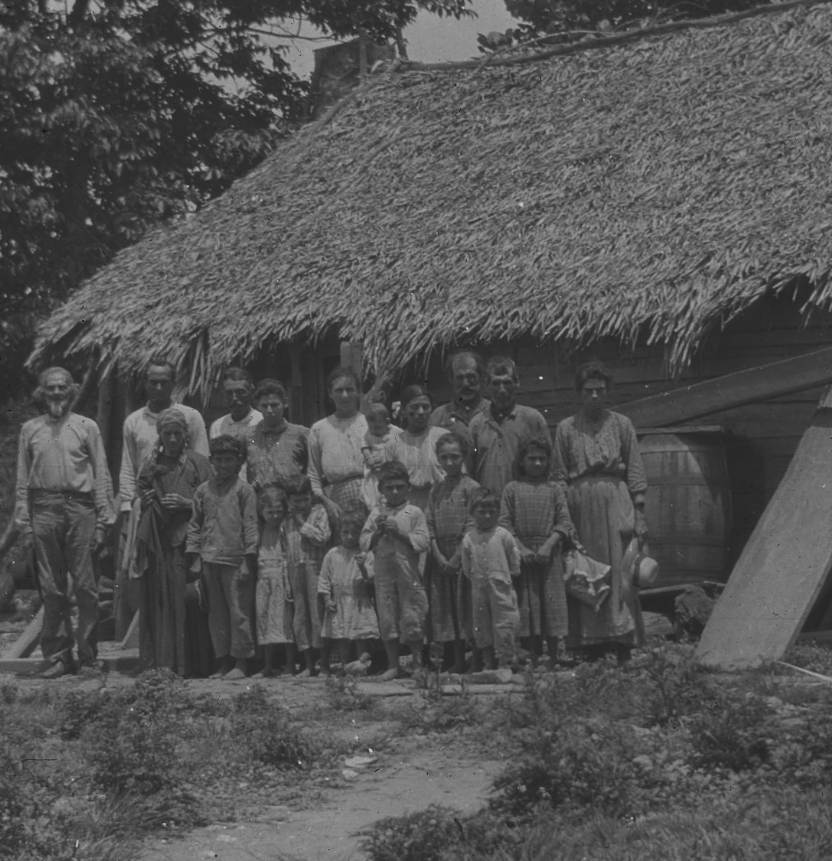
Houma people standing by thatched house.

Anthropologist John Reed Swanton visited surviving Houma people in 1907 when they lived in six settlements in six different bayous. They had intermarried with neighboring tribes, African-Americans, and European-Americans. They hunted, fished, and worked on sugarcane plantations. Their leader was Bob Verret. Despite reportedly descending from several tribes, including the Bayogoula, Acolapissa, Biloxi, and Chitimacha and possibly the Washa, Chawasha, and others, they identified as "Houma" at that time.

Houma residing in Terrebonne Parish were segregated in schooling until 1963, when the Naquin v. Terrebonne Parish School Board ruling stated that they should be allowed to enroll in white schools in accordance with federal mandate. A plan for full integration of Houma into schools was submitted by August 13, 1964. On April 28, 1966, a desegregation order was signed and Houma, European-Americans, and African-Americans formed an integrated student body in Terrebonne Parish.

== Ethnobotany ==
The Houma people take a decoction of dried Gamochaeta purpurea for colds and influenza. They make an infusion of the leaves and root of Cirsium horridulum in whiskey, and use it as an astringent, as well as drink it to clear phlegm from lungs and throat. They also eat the plant's tender, white heart raw. A decoction of the aerial parts of the Berchemia scandens vine was used for impotency by the Houma people.

== Modern identification ==
=== State recognition ===
The state of Louisiana has one state-recognized tribe that identifies as being of Houma descent, the United Houma Nation.

In 1972, the Houma Tribe was formed, primarily representing eastern communities, while the Houma Alliance was created in 1974 by members of western settlements dissatisfied with the organization. The Houma received state recognition in 1977, and the two organizations merged in 1979 to form the United Houma Nation.

According to the United Houma Nation Inc., as of 2023 they have approximately 17,000 members. Most of these reside within a six-parish area that encompasses 4,750 square miles (12,300 km^{2}). These parishes are St. Mary, Terrebonne, Lafourche, Jefferson, Plaquemines, and St. Bernard.

=== Petition for federal recognition ===
The United Houma Nation petitioned for federal recognition with the Bureau of Indian Affairs (BIA) in 1979.

In 1994, the BIA published a preliminary finding that the United Houma Nation did not meet three of the seven criteria for recognition as an Indian tribe. There was no evidence that the United Houma Nation descended from any historical Indian tribe, their ancestors did not constitute a distinct social community before 1830, and their ancestors exercised no political influence over a community before 1830.

They described the UHN as presenting a unique case, stating that the group constituted a distinct community of verifiable Native American ancestry whose elderly members retained knowledge of words from Native American Languages into the 20th century. A majority of the group's ancestral settlements were identified as "Indian" in federal censuses. However the BIA concluded that the group could not be definitively documented to be descended from a single historical tribe.

The ancestors of the UHN were "predominantly French, Acadian, German, and African" who settled near Bayou Terrebonne around the 1790s. Three Native American ancestors were identified; however, their tribes affiliation could not be determined, and each moved to the settlement independently. Two of these ancestors founded the Courteau and Verdin families, while one married into the Billiot family. By 1820, the Verdin, Courteau, and Billiot families were living adjacent to one other and are the three founding families of the UHN. The families subsequently intermarried with non-Indigenous families, and established additional settlements connected to the original community.

In Its response to the Proposed Finding, the UHN cited an 1892 statement referring to "a remnant of the Houmas, intermarried with negroes and other Indians who have a village on Bayou Terre Bonne and number 336 souls". The response also referenced an 1868 letter written by a pastor in Montegut describing Native Americans living on the Bayous neighbouring Bayou Terrebonne.

The United Houma Nation has an active petition for federal acknowledgment under the newer 2015 criteria. The BIA is waiting for the United Houma Nation to submit further documentation.
