= Opelousa =

Historical Native American tribe in Louisiana

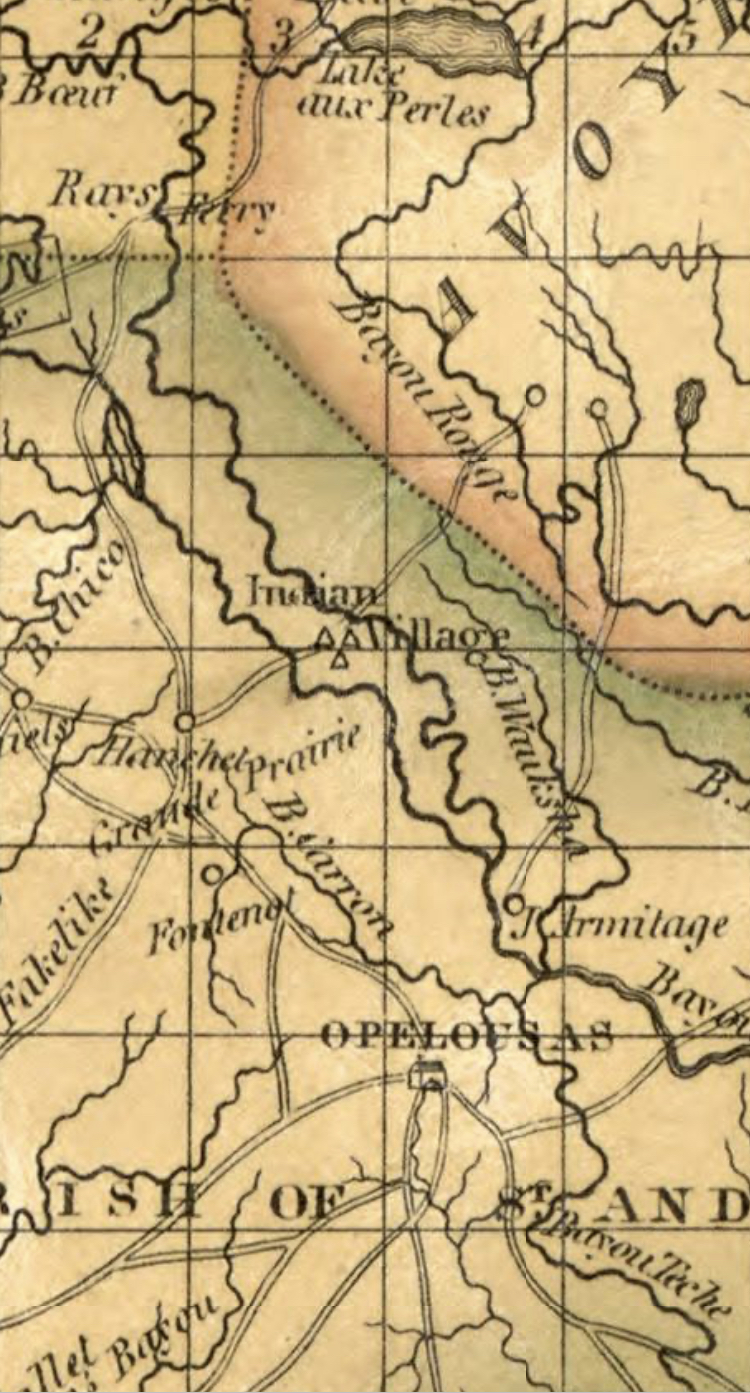
- Indian village north of Opelousas on 1820 map of Louisiana may be associated with the Appalousa people (LCCN 2013593202)

Total population
- extinct as a tribe, likely merged into the Atakapa in the early 19th century

Regions with significant populations
- central-southwest Louisiana

Languages
- unattested

Religion
- Indigenous religion

Related ethnic groups
- Atakapa

The Opelousa (also Appalousa) were an Indigenous people of the Southeastern Woodlands in Louisiana. They lived near present-day Opelousas, Louisiana, west of the lower Mississippi River, in the 18th century. At various times, they allied with the neighboring Atakapa and Chitimacha peoples.

== Territory ==
Michel De Birotte, who lived in Louisiana from 1690 to 1734 and spent 40 years living among the Indians, wrote the Appalousa lived just west of two small lakes. This description is thought to apply to Leonard Swamp (east of present-day Opelousas). During the period, this was the westernmost channel of the Mississippi River. Due to mineral deposits and the great number of leaves covering the bottom, the lake waters appeared black. The Appalousa who hunted and fished in the lake found their legs became stained black from these waters. Appalousa and Atakapa tribes originated in the same region in central-southwest Louisiana.

== History ==
Their 18th-century village had about 40 men. They raised corn, cattle, and pigs. From American State Papers, a member of the Appalousa and Atakapa region in 1814, said that both tribes had villages on the north and south parts of the bayou.

The Appalousa are referred to as also the Lopelousas and Oqué-Loussas by Antoine-Simon Le Page du Pratz, an 18th-century French historian and ethnographer, but it is still debated if these are all the same tribe. Du Pratz said that this tribe resided on lakeshores that had a black appearance due to the leaves that covered the bottoms of the lakes. This connects to one theory of how they received the names "black leg, black hair, black skull," etc. This is also debated as other historians and explorers have stated that the people of the tribe would paint their legs black to contrast with their lighter skin.

As settlers pushed into Mississippi further west, the territory that the Appalousas resided in came to be known as the Opelousas district which remains a district in Louisiana today. The name is also used for St Landry Parish in Louisiana. An 1890 history of southwest Louisiana reported, "Mr. Alfred Louaillier states that within his recollection there were more Indians to be seen in the streets of Opelousas than there are negroes at the present days."

== Origin story ==
The Atakapa origin story, which they shared with neighboring tribes, describes two forbidden lovers from different tribes, one an elite woman and the other a warrior. The women's father did not approve and followed them to swamplands where they met and killed the warrior. The woman retaliated by stabbing herself which saddened the great spirit and hung her hair in an oak tree, turning gray and spreading through the trees over time. This story served as an example of the importance of Appalousa territorial history. This history also emphasized its profitability and economics which led French traders to establish the city of Opelousas in 1740.

== Religion ==
There is very little known about the practices and religion of the Appalousa tribe; however, tracing genealogy in St. Landry Parish, Louisiana lists Appalousas Indians that were buried and baptized. This list includes Appalousa Indians as well as Indians from other tribes across Louisiana. Joseph Willis, an African American Baptist preacher was among the tribe prior to 1812.

== Population ==
According to findings from a few historians, the Appalousa population in 1715 was roughly 130 men, and by 1908, there were 9 people in the tribe. There is debate over the population growth of the tribe but what is consistent is their slow decline towards the early 19th century.

First mentioned in an unpublished report by Bienville (former governor of Louisiana), a small wandering tribe, 1715 the population was about 130 men/warriors, 1805 the population was about 40 and 1814 the tribe was at about 20 members.

The first record of Appalousa territory was found in the 1690s and it was not until 1712 that both the Opelousa and Atakapa regions were recorded as settlements in Louisiana.

== Language ==
Opelousa
- Region: Louisiana
- Extinct: (date missing)
- Language family: unclassified

Language codes
- ISO 639-3: None (mis)
- Linguist List: 07p
- Glottolog: None

John Sibley reported in an 1805 letter to Thomas Jefferson that the Opelousa spoke a language different from all others but many understood Atakapa (itself a language isolate) and French. (This area had been colonized by the French since the mid-18th century.) Their language is completely undocumented.

In the early 20th century, anthropologists John R. Swanton and Frederick W. Hodge tentatively classified the Opelousa language as Atakapa.

Their languages were linguistically similar as both Opelousa and Atakapa are Choctaw words. It is unclear whether the word "Opelousa" itself is unclear whether it is a Choctaw word, but translations from Choctaw include "black above", "black legs", and other variations. In 1805, John Sibley, Indian Agent of New Orleans territory, said that the word Appalousa meant "black head" or "black leg" and while similar to Atakapa, their language was unheard of but understood Atakapa as well as French.

== Name ==
The origin of the name "Appalousa" is unknown but speculated to be Choctaw, with "aba" meaning "above" or "api" meaning "body" or "leg" followed by "lusa", meaning "black." The meaning of Opelousa changes depending on which Choctaw elements are correct, "aba" and lusa have translations to "black hair" but using "api" and "lusa" translates to "black legs."

The tribe may have painted or stained their lower legs a dark color.

== Relations with other tribes ==
Tribes in Texas used the Appalousa as middlemen in selling horses stolen from the Spanish to the French in New Orleans. Had relations with the Atakapas, Chitimacha, and Avoyel tribes of the surrounding region and acted as a middleman between them in trade. They received fish from the Chitimacha and Atakapa which was traded with the Avoyel for flint because they had an overabundance of it although it was most likely traded and exchanged with other tribes.

Historians have come together to dismiss the fate of the Appalousa and other tribes of the southwestern region of Louisiana, writing that the Appalousa and Atakapas no longer exist. These smaller Native tribes were struck with disease, malnutrition, and colonization which may have contributed to this conclusion. Historians and researchers also pass on theories of intermarriage and interracial relations with the French. However, Andrew Jolivétte argues that descendants of these tribes assimilated and intermarried with Creoles.

According to Claude Medford, a Choctaw craftsman, around the 1920s, the Appalousas camped at Ringrose plantation, sold palmetto stems and cane split baskets to the owners of the plantation and engaged in games of stickball with the Tunica.

=== Conflict ===
The population decreased due to conflict with whites and the Muskhogean tribe. The only diet known is fish, more specifically flounder, a favorite of the region, which they also used in trade for flints. The Appalousa went to war with the Avoyel tribe (that may have belonged to the larger Muskhogean tribe). As the latter refused to trade flints that they had an abundance of, some Avoyels were captured and according to some, they were eaten, although it is unknown and debated whether acts of cannibalism occurred in the Appalousa or Atakapa tribes.
