= Muskogean languages =

Language family of Southeast US

Muskogean
- Geographic distribution: Southeastern North America
- Linguistic classification: One of the world's primary language families
- Early form: Proto-Muskogean
- Subdivisions: Choctaw–Chickasaw; Alabama–Koasati; Hitchiti–Mikasuki; Muscogee; Apalachee †; Houma †

Language codes
- Glottolog: musk1252
- Pre-contact distribution of Muskogean languages

Muskogean (/məs.ˈkoʊ.ɡi.ən/, məs-KOH-ghee-ən; also Muskhogean) is a language family spoken in the Southeastern United States. The state with the largest population of speakers today is Oklahoma. Members of the family are Indigenous languages of the Americas. Typologically, Muskogean languages are highly synthetic and agglutinative. One documented language, Apalachee, is no longer spoken, and the remaining languages are critically endangered.

== Genetic relationships ==
=== Family division ===
The Muskogean family consists of Alabama, Chickasaw, Choctaw, Muscogee (or Creek), Koasati, Apalachee, and Hitchiti-Mikasuki. Hitchiti is generally considered a dialect of Mikasuki. "Seminole" is sometimes used for either a dialect of Muscogee spoken in Oklahoma, or to refer to the Mikasuki which is the ancestral language of most Florida Seminoles, while "Cow Creek Seminole" more specifically refers to a dialect of Muscogee spoken by a minority of Seminoles in Florida.

The major subdivisions of the family have long been controversial, but the following lower-level groups are universally accepted: Choctaw–Chickasaw, Alabama–Koasati, Hitchiti–Mikasuki, and Muscogee. Apalachee is no longer spoken; its precise relationship to the other languages is uncertain, but Mary Haas and Pamela Munro both classify it with the Alabama–Koasati group.

==== Haas's classification ====
For connections among these groupings, one influential classification is that of Mary Haas and Karen Booker, in which "Western Muskogean" (Choctaw-Chickasaw) is seen as one major branch, and "Eastern Muskogean" (Alabama-Koasati, Hitchiti-Mikasuki, and Muscogee) as another. Within Eastern Muskogean, Alabama-Koasati and Hitchiti-Mikasuki are generally thought to be more closely related to each other than to Muscogee. That classification is reflected in the list below:

- Muskogean
  - Western Muskogean
    - Chickasaw
    - Choctaw (also called Chahta, Chacato)
  - Eastern Muskogean
    - Muscogee (also called Muskogee, Maskoke, Mvskoke, Seminole, and Creek)
    - Hitchiti-Mikasuki (also called Miccosukee or Seminole)
    - Apalachee–Alabama–Koasati
      - Apalachee †
      - Alabama (also called Alibamu)
      - Koasati (also called Coushatta)

==== Munro's classification ====
A different classification has been proposed by Pamela Munro. In her classification, the languages are divided into a "Southern Muskogean" branch (Choctaw-Chickasaw, Alabama-Koasati, and Hitchiti-Mikasuki) and a "Northern Muskogean" one (Muscogee). Southern Muskogean is then subdivided into Hitchiti-Mikasuki and a "Southwestern Muskogean" branch containing Alabama-Koasati and "Western Muskogean" (Choctaw-Chickasaw). The classification is reflected in the list below:

- Muskogean
  - Northern Muskogean
    - Muscogee
  - Southern Muskogean
    - Hitchiti-Mikasuki
    - Southwestern Muskogean
      - Apalachee †
      - Alabama–Koasati
        - Alabama
        - Koasati
      - Western Muskogean
        - Chickasaw
        - Choctaw

=== Broader relationships ===
==== Possible Muskogean languages ====
Several sparsely attested languages have been claimed to be Muskogean languages. George Broadwell suggested that the languages of the Yamasee and Guale were Muskogean. However, William Sturtevant argued that the "Yamasee" and "Guale" data were Muscogee and that the language(s) spoken by the Yamasee and Guale people remain unknown. It is possible that the Yamasee were an amalgamation of several different ethnic groups and did not speak a single language. Chester B. DePratter describes the Yamasee as consisting mainly of speakers of Hitchiti and Guale. The historian Steven Oatis also describes the Yamasee as an ethnically mixed group that included people from Muskogean-speaking regions, such as the early colonial-era native towns of Hitchiti, Coweta, and Cussita.

The Amacano, Chacato, Chine, Pacara, and Pensacola people, who lived along the Gulf Coast of Florida from the Big Bend Coast to Pensacola Bay, are reported to have spoken the same Muskogean language, which may have been closely related to Choctaw.

Sparse evidence indicates that a Muskogean language was spoken by at least some of the people of the in Cofitachequi in northeastern South Carolina. If so, that would be the most eastern outpost of Muskogean. The people of Cofitichequi were probably absorbed by nearby Siouan and Iroquoian speakers in the late 17th century.

A vocabulary of the Houma may be another underdocumented Western Muskogean language or a version of Mobilian Jargon, a pidgin based on Western Muskogean.

==== Gulf ====
The best-known connection proposed between Muskogean and other languages is Mary Haas' Gulf hypothesis, in which she conceived of a macrofamily comprising Muskogean and a number of language isolates of the southeastern US: Atakapa, Chitimacha, Tunica, and Natchez. While well-known, the Gulf grouping is now generally rejected by historical linguists. Some Muskogean scholars continue to assert that Muskogean is related to Natchez.

== Features ==
=== Nouns ===
Nouns in Muskogean languages may take prefixes indicating the person and number of a possessor. Noun phrases may be marked for grammatical case, with a distinction between subjects (nominative case) and nonsubjects (oblique case). Some Muskogean languages have affixes indicating plural nouns (generally human nouns) or groups.

=== Verbs ===
Muskogean verbs are highly synthetic, with affixes for tense, aspect, person, number, direction, and mood. While case marking is nominative–accusative, person marking is active–stative, with separate series of agent, patient, and indirect object person markers.

Verbs have a complex system of ablaut indicating aspect. In Muskogean linguistics, the different forms are known as "grades" or "themes".

All the languages make use of suppletive verbs indicating the number of the subject in an intransitive verb or the number of the direct object in a transitive verb.

Innately-numbered verbal stems, Mikasuki:

haca:l-om
stand.SG.SBJ
"(one) is standing"

loko:k-om
stand.DU
"(two) stand"

loko:ka:c-om
stand.PL
"(three or more) stand"

== Vocabulary ==
Below is a list of basic vocabulary in five Muskogean languages from Broadwell (1992):

Muskogean basic vocabulary from by Broadwell (1992)

gloss	Chickasaw	Choctaw	Alabama	Mikasuki	Muscogee
all	mõma	mõma	óyha	maamos-	omalka
ashes	hottok	hitokchobi	histo	tolhambi	iisso
belly	ittakoba'	iffoka	ikfi	lampi	nalhki
big	ishto	chito	coba	coob-	lhakkii
bird	foshi'	hoshi	foosi	foosi	foswa
bite	kisili	kopooli	kachalhlhi	kabalikci	akkita
black	losa	losa	loca	looci	lasti
blood	issish	issish	lhakhani	picikci	caati
bone	foni'	foni	cokfoni	-fooni	iffoni
breast	ip shik	ip shik	pisi	owaaci	hokpi
burn	lowa	lowah	libatli	yill-	noklhita
claw	iyyakchosh	iyyakchosh	iyyaksi	iiyakoosi	ilinkososwa
cloud	hoshonti	hoshõti	onoolici	hosoti	aholocii
cold	kapassa	kapassa	kasatka	kapaali	kasappi
come	minti	m ti	ila	ont-	atita
die	illi	illi	illi	il-	ilita
dog	ofi'	ofi	ifa	iifi	ifa
drink	ishko	ishko	isko	isk-	iskita
dry	shila	shila	solotka	sokook-	kalhpii
ear	haksibis	haksobish	hakco	hacoobi	hakco
earth	yakni'	yakni	ihaani	yakni	iikana
eat	impa	pa	ipa	imp-	hompita
egg	akankoshi'	akãkoshi	akaakocóòsi	onaasi	costaki
eye	ishkin	nishkin	ittilhi	iti	tolhwa
fat (grease)	niha	bila	nitokci	niihi	nihaa
fire	lowak	lowak	tikba	iiti	tootka
fish	nani'	nani	lhalho	lhaalhi	lhalho
fly, to	wakaa	hika	wakayka	yakaal-	tamkita
foot	iyyi'	iyyi	iyyi	iyi	ili
full	kayya	kayya	kayya	labakni	fackita
give	ima	ima	inka	iik-	imita
good	chokma	achokma	kano	hiilhi	h lhi
green	okchamali	okchamaali	okcakko	honotbitalakci	laani
hair	pãshi'/hishi'	pãshi/hishi	hissi	tokisi	issi
hand	ilbak	ibbak	ilbi	ilbi	inki
head	ishkobo'	noshkobo	isbakko	yoosi	ika
hear	hánglo	haklo	haalo	hakl-	pohita
heart	chõkash	chõkash	conoska	conosbi	fiiki
horn	lapish	lapish	lapihci	lap-i	yapi
I	ano'	ano	ana	aani	ani
kill	abi	abi	ibi	ill c	iliicita
knee	iyyinto'lhka'	iyyi kalaaha	ittôlhpa	tolhpi	tolhkowa
know	ithána	ikhana	sobayli	ataalh	kilhlhita
lie down, to	tí'wa	talaaya	baláàli	talaal	wakkita
liver	salakha	salakha	illopi	lopi	lopi
long	falaa	falaaya	baski	backi	capki
louse	issap	issap	icha	hicahci	icka
man	hattak nakni'	hattak nakni	naani	nakni	honanwa
many	lawa	lawa	lawa	aconki	solkii
meat (flesh)	nipi'	nipi	nipo	akni	apiswa
mountain	onchaba	habik	bokkoscaaha		iikanhalwii
mouth	iti	itialbi	icokhalbi	ici	cokwa
name	holhchifo	hohchifo	holcifa	hocilki	hocifka
neck	nokhistap	ikkõla	nokbi	nokbi	nokwa
new	himitta	himmona	hahpa	himaci	mocasi
night	oklhili'	ninak	tanka	niilhaki	nilhii
nose	ibichchala'	ibishakni	ibisaani	ibi	yopoo
not	ki'yo	kiiyo	mánko	maati	monks
one	chaffa	achaffa	caffaaka	lhaamin	hamkin
person (human)	hattak	hattak	aati	yaati	isti
rain	omba	õba	oyba	okoob-	oskita
red	homma	homma	homma	kitisci	caati
road (path)	hina'	hina	hini	hini	nini
root	haksish	hakshish	assikci	aski	yalomka
round	lhibokta	kalaaha	bonotka	polocki	polooki
say	aachi	aachi	manka	kaac	maakita
sand	shinok	shinok	sanco	samooci	oktaaha
see	p sa	p sa	hicha	hica	hicita
seed	nihi'	nihi	hilhikci	yiilhi	nilhka
sit	bínni'li	biniili	cokóòli	cokool-	leykita
skin	hakshop	hakshop	affakci	halbi	halhpi
sleep	nosi	nosi	noci	nooc-	nocita
small	iskanno'si	osi	cinoofa	wink-	cotki
smoke	shobohli	shobohli	sobotli	ockoci	ikkoci
stand	híkki'ya	hikiiya	lokóòli	lokooka	hoylhita
star	foshik	fichik	hociilhi	owaaciki	kocacampa
stone	tali'	tali	tali	tali	cato
sun	hashi'	hashi	hasi	haasi	hasi
swim	yopi	okshiniili	oohapka	opahk-	omeyyita
tail	hasimbish	has bis	haci	haaci	haci
that	yamma	ma	akki	ma	ma
this	yappa	pa	ya	ya	ya
thou	ishno'	chishno	isna	cihn-	ciimi
tongue	isõlash	ittõlas	icoolaksi	cokolaasi	tolaaswa
tooth	noti'	noti	innati	-nooti	noti
tree	itti'	itti	itto	ahi	ito
two	toklo	toklo	tôklo	toklan	hokkoolin
walk	nõwa	nowa	ciyahli	cayahl	yakapita
warm (hot)	lashpa	lashpa	ikba	hãyyi	hayyita
water	oka'	oka	oki	ooki	oywa
we	poshno'	pishno	posna	pohni	poomi
what	nanta	natah	náàsi	naaki	naaki
white	tohbi	tohbi	hatka	hatki	hatki
who	kata	katah	náksi	noolh-	isteyma
woman	ihoo	ohooyo	tayyi	tayki	hoktii
yellow	lakna	lakna	laana	lakni	laanii

== Proto-language ==
Proto-Muskogean
- Reconstruction of: Muskogean languages

=== Phonology ===
Proto-Muskogean is reconstructed as having the consonants (given in IPA transcription):

	Labial	Alveolar		Palatal	Velar	
	Labial	Median	Lateral	Palatal	Plain	Labialized
Stops	*p	*t			*k	*kʷ
Affricates		*ts		*tʃ		
Fricatives		*s	*ɬ	*ʃ	*x	*xʷ
Nasals	*m	*n				
Approximants			*l	*j		*w
Other		*θ [n̥]				

The phonemes reconstructed by Haas as */x/ and */xʷ/ show up as /h/ and /f/ (or /ɸ/), respectively, in all Muskogean languages; they are therefore reconstructed by some as */h/ and */ɸ/. */kʷ/ appears as /b/ in all the daughter languages except Muscogee for which it is /k/ initially and /p/ medially. The value of the proto-phoneme conventionally written ⟨θ⟩ (or ⟨N⟩) is unknown; it appears as /n/ in Western Muskogean languages and as /ɬ/ in Eastern Muskogean languages. Haas reconstructed it as a voiceless /n/ (that is, */n̥/), based partly on presumed cognates in Natchez.
