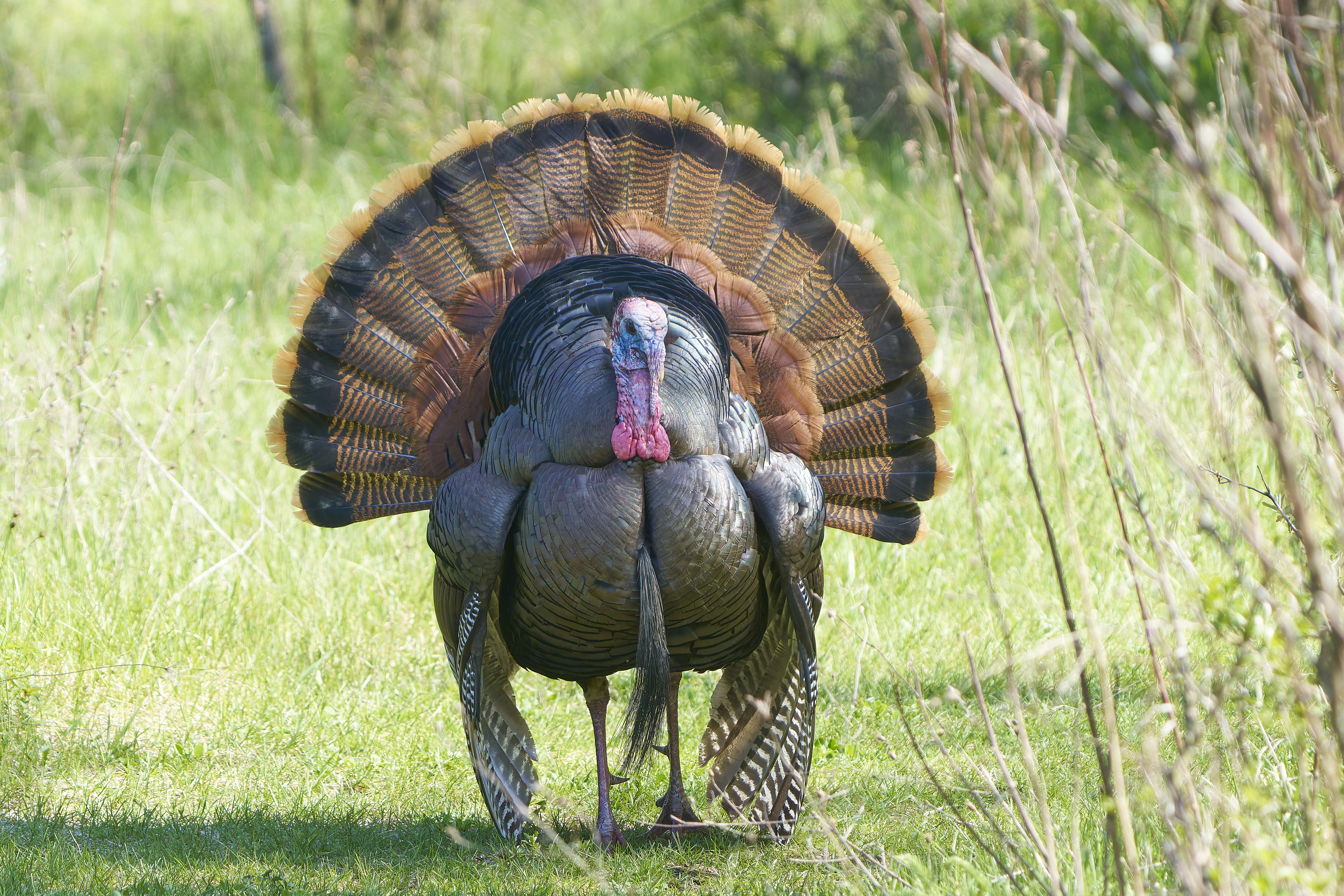
- Male (tom/gobbler) wild turkey displaying
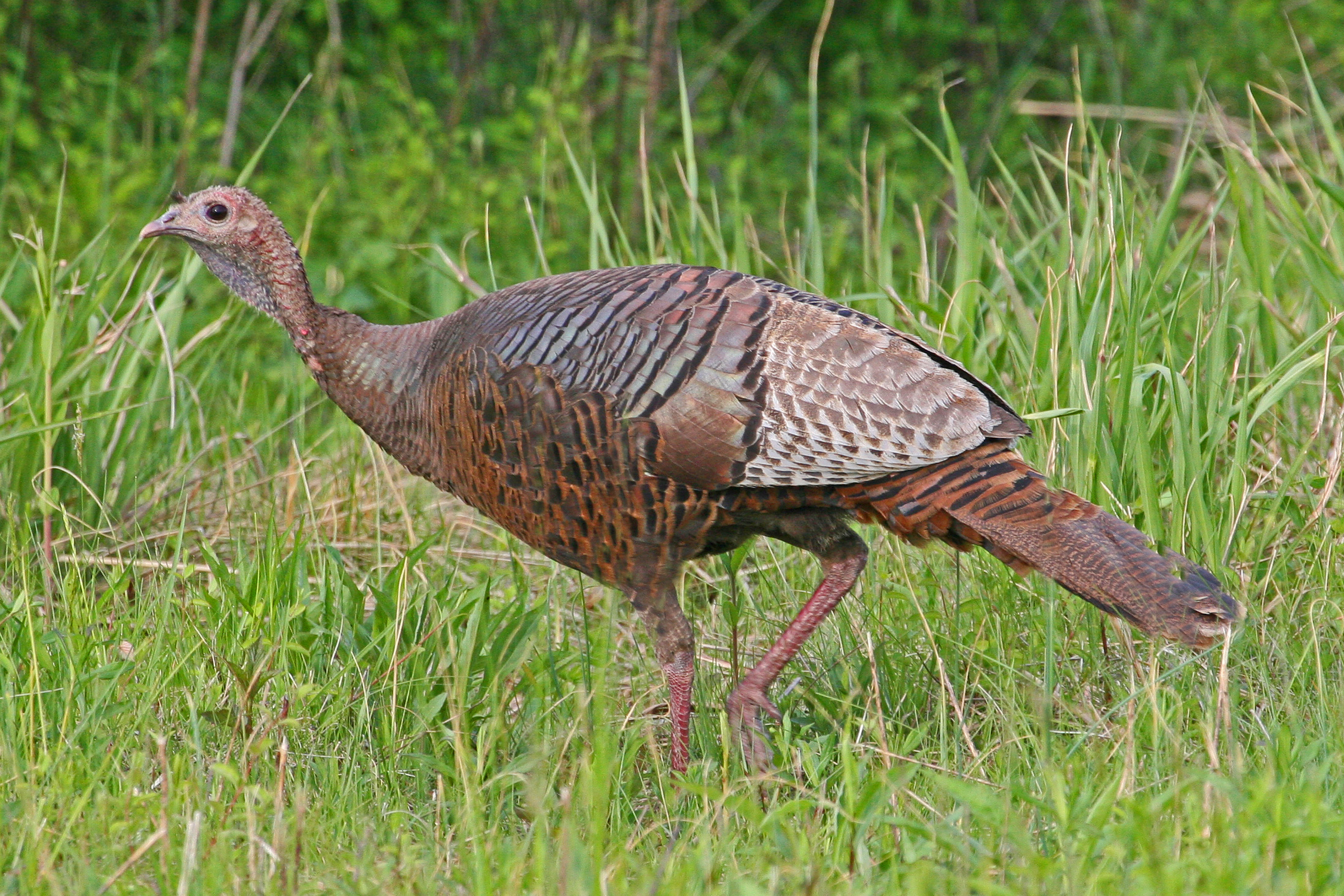
- Female (hen)

Conservation status
- Least Concern (IUCN 3.1)

Scientific classification
- Kingdom: Animalia
- Phylum: Chordata
- Class: Aves
- Order: Galliformes
- Family: Phasianidae
- Genus: Meleagris
- Species: M. gallopavo

Binomial name
- Meleagris gallopavo Linnaeus, 1758

Subspecies
- 6, see text

= Wild turkey =

Species of turkey native to North America

The wild turkey (Meleagris gallopavo) is an upland game bird native to North America, one of two extant species of turkey and the heaviest member of the order Galliformes. It is the ancestor to the domestic turkey (M. g. domesticus), which was originally derived from a southern Mexican subspecies of wild turkey (not the related ocellated turkey).

== Taxonomy ==
The wild turkey was formally described in 1758 by the Swedish naturalist Carl Linnaeus in the tenth edition of his Systema Naturae under its current binomial name Meleagris gallopavo. The type locality is Mexico. The genus name Meleagris is from Ancient Greek μελεαγρις/meleagris meaning "guineafowl". The specific epithet gallopavo is a late Medieval Latin word for a wild turkey: it combines Latin gallus meaning "fowl" and pavo meaning "peacock". The word was used in 1555 by the Swiss naturalist Conrad Gessner in his Historiae animalium.

Six subspecies are recognised:

Subspecies	Common name	Distribution
Meleagris gallopavo gallopavo Linnaeus, 1758	South Mexican wild turkey	south Mexico
Meleagris gallopavo intermedia Sennett, 1879	Rio Grande wild turkey	north Texas to central east Mexico
Meleagris gallopavo merriami Nelson, 1900	Merriam's wild turkey	west USA
Meleagris gallopavo mexicana Gould, 1856	Gould's wild turkey	northwest, central north Mexico (includes onusta)
Meleagris gallopavo osceola Scott, 1890	Florida wild turkey	Florida (USA)
Meleagris gallopavo silvestris Vieillot, 1817	Eastern wild turkey	south Canada and central, east USA

== Description ==
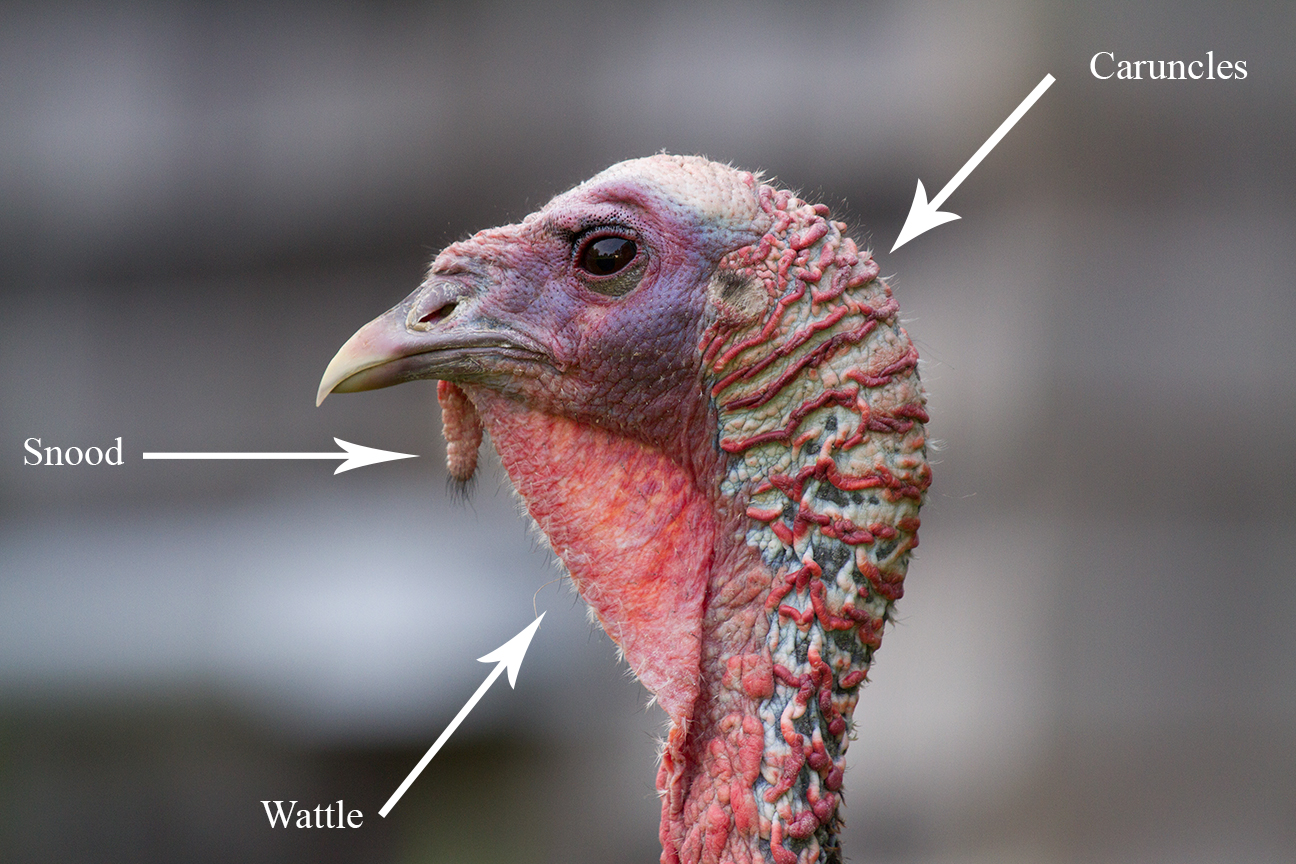
Close-up of head features

An adult male (tom or gobbler) normally weighs from 5 to 11 kg (11 to 24 lb) and measures 100–125 cm (39–49 in) in length. The adult female (hen) is typically much smaller at 2.5–5.4 kg (5.5–11.9 lb) and is 76 to 95 cm (30 to 37 in) long. Per two large studies, the average weight of adult males is 7.6 kg (17 lb) and the average weight of adult females is 4.26 kg (9.4 lb). The record-sized adult male wild turkey, according to the National Wild Turkey Federation, weighed 17.06 kg (37.6 lb), with records of tom turkeys weighing over 13.8 kg (30 lb) uncommon but not rare. Considering its maximum and average weight, it is among the heaviest flying birds in the world.

The wings are relatively small, as is typical of the galliform order, and the wingspan ranges from 1.25 to 1.44 m (4 ft 1 in to 4 ft 9 in). The wing chord is only 20 to 21.4 cm (7.9 to 8.4 in). The bill is also relatively small, as adults measure 2 to 3.2 cm (0.79 to 1.26 in) in culmen length. The tarsus of the wild turkey is quite long and sturdy, measuring from 9.7 to 19.1 cm (3.8 to 7.5 in). The tail is also relatively long, ranging from 24.5 to 50.5 cm (9.6 to 19.9 in).

Fully-grown wild turkeys have long, reddish-yellow to grayish-green legs. Each foot has three front toes, with a shorter, rear-facing toe; males have a spur behind each of their lower legs, used to spar with other males.

The body feathers are generally blackish and dark, sometimes gray-brown, overall, with a coppery sheen that becomes more complex in older males. Mature males have a large, featherless, reddish head and red throat, with red wattles on the throat and neck. The head has fleshy, unique growths called caruncles, which may be used to identify certain birds from one another. When toms are excited, a fleshy flap on the bill (called a snood) expands, and this, the wattles and the bare skin of the head and neck all become red with enhanced flow of blood to the head. Tail feathers are of the same length in adults but of different lengths in juveniles.

Males have a long, dark, fan-shaped tail and glossy, bronze wings. As with many other species of Galliformes, turkeys exhibit strong sexual dimorphism. The male is substantially larger than the female, and his feathers have areas of red, purple, green, copper, bronze, and gold iridescence. The preen gland (uropygial gland) is also larger in males compared to females. In contrast to the majority of other birds, they are colonized by bacteria of unknown function (Corynebacterium uropygiale). Males typically have at least one "beard", a tuft of coarse hair-like filaments (mesofiloplumes), growing from the center of the breast. Beards grow continuously during the turkey's lifespan and a one-year-old male has a beard up to 5 in (13 cm) long. Approximately 10% of females have a beard, usually shorter and thinner than that of the male.

Females have feathers that are duller overall, in shades of brown and gray. Parasites can dull the coloration of both sexes; in males, vivid coloration may serve as a signal of health. The primary wing feathers have white bars. Turkeys have approximately 5,000 to 6,000 feathers. Juvenile males are called jakes; the difference between jakes and toms is that jakes have very short "beards" and tail fans with longer feathers in the middle. The tom's tail fan feathers are uniform in length.

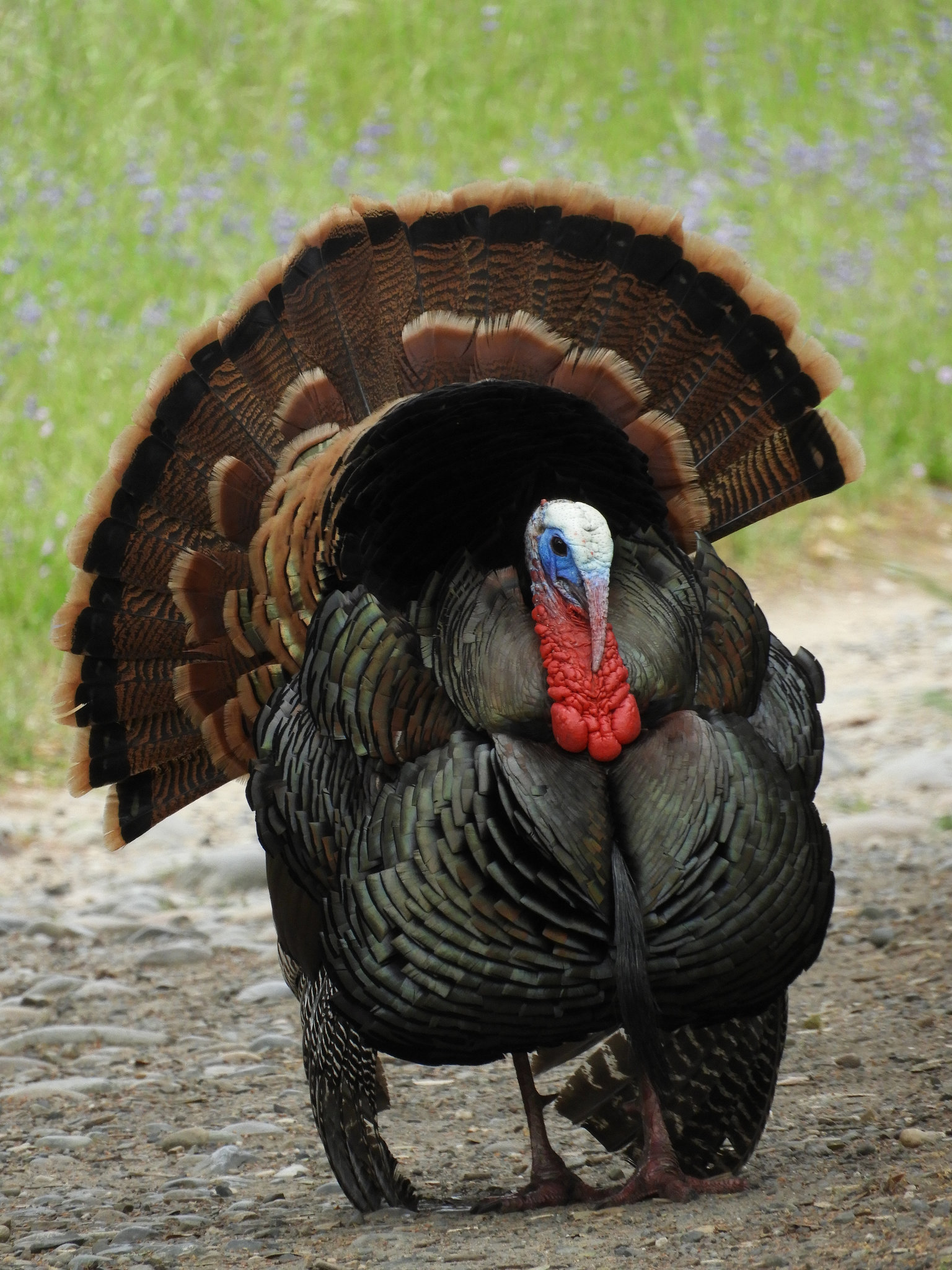
Closeup of a tom M. g. intermedia, at Sacramento County, California

The turkey has the second-highest maximum average weight of any North American bird, after the trumpeter swan (Cygnus buccinator). By average mass, however, several other American birds surpass the mean weight of the turkey, including the American white pelican (Pelecanus erythrorhynchos), the tundra swan (Cygnus columbianus columbianus), the endangered California condor (Gymnogyps californianus), and whooping crane (Grus americana).

== Habitat ==
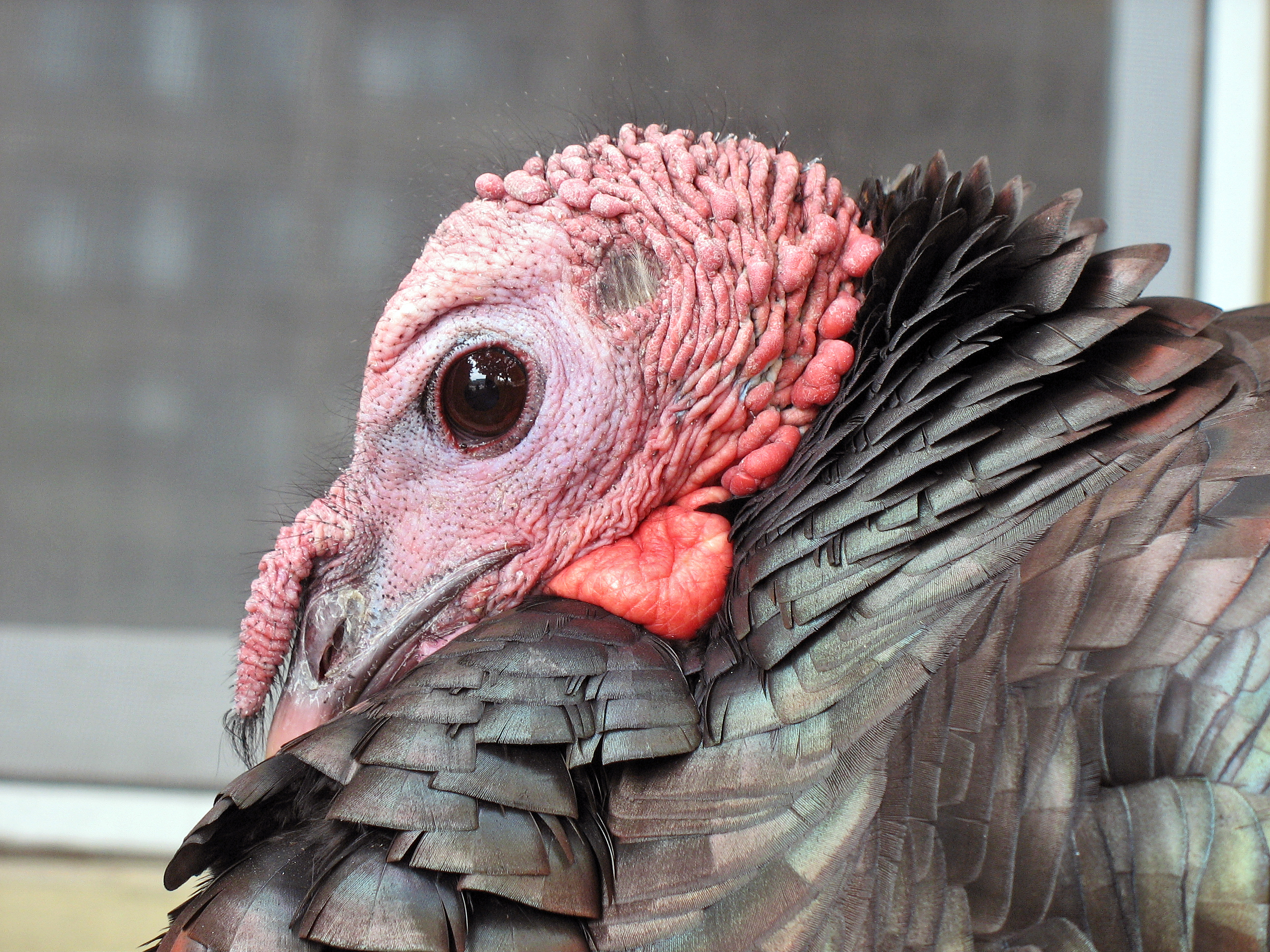
Eastern subspecies

Wild turkeys prefer hardwood and mixed conifer-hardwood forests with scattered openings such as pastures, fields, orchards and seasonal marshes. They seemingly can adapt to virtually any dense native plant community as long as coverage and openings are widely available. Open, mature forest with a variety of interspersion of tree species appear to be preferred. In the Northeast of North America, turkeys are most profuse in hardwood timber of oak-hickory (Quercus-Carya) and forests of red oak (Quercus rubra), beech (Fagus grandifolia), cherry (Prunus serotina) and white ash (Fraxinus americana). Best ranges for turkeys in the Coastal Plain and Piedmont sections have an interspersion of clearings, farms, and plantations with preferred habitat along principal rivers and in cypress (Taxodium distichum) and tupelo (Nyssa sylvatica) swamps.

In the Appalachian Plateau and Cumberland Plateau birds occupy mixed forest of oaks and pines on southern and western slopes, also hickory with diverse understories. Bald cypress and sweet gum (Liquidambar styraciflua) swamps of south Florida; also hardwood of Cliftonia (a heath) and oak in north-central Florida. Lykes Fisheating Creek area of south Florida has up to 51% cypress, 12% hardwood hammocks, 17% glades of short grasses with isolated live oak (Quercus virginiana); nesting in neighboring prairies. Original habitat here was mainly longleaf pine (Pinus palustris) with turkey oak (Quercus laevis) and slash pine (Pinus elliottii) "flatwoods", now mainly replaced by slash pine plantations.

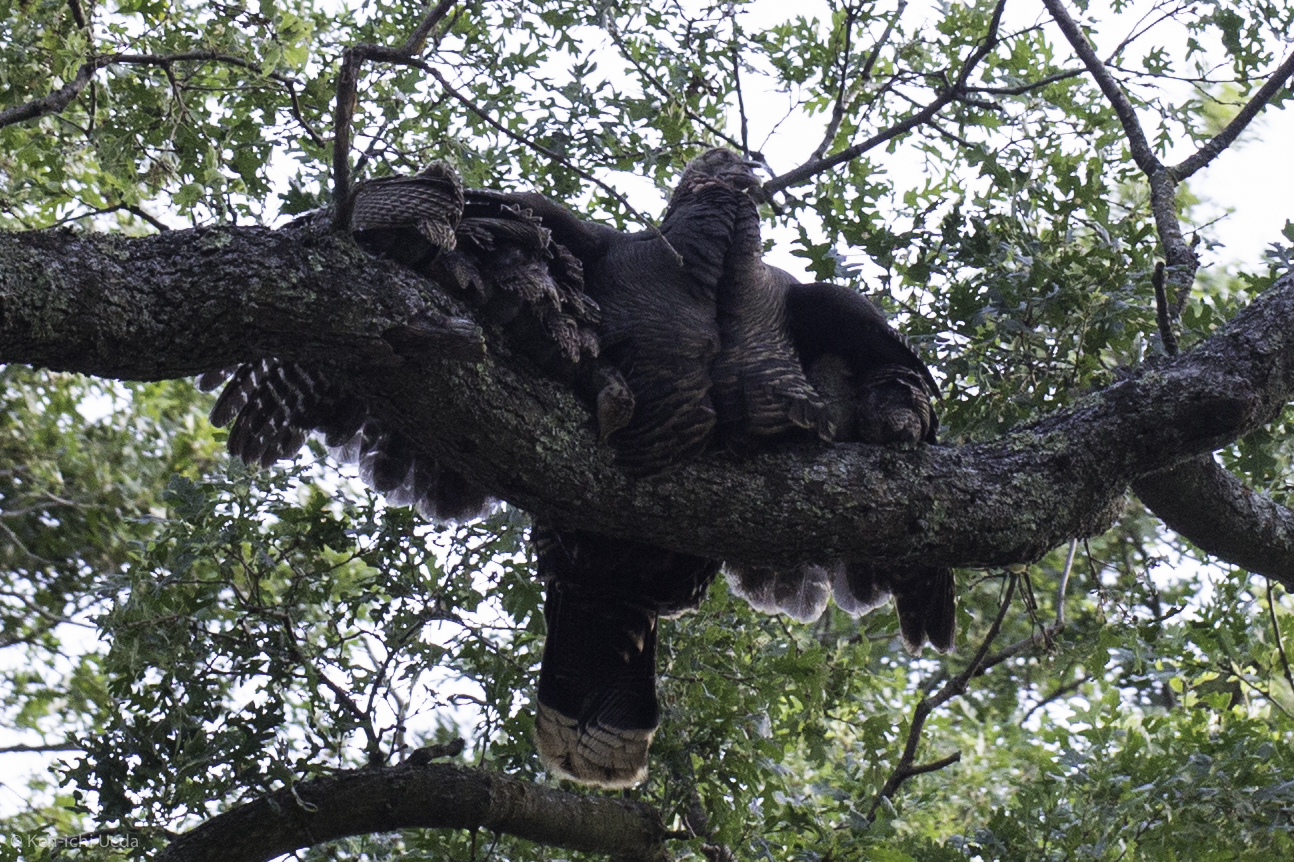
Female sheltering her young for the evening, at Mount Diablo State Park

In California, turkeys live in a wide range of habitats; acorns are a favorite food, in addition to wild oats (Avena barbata), drawing turkeys to areas of open oak forest and oak savanna across the central areas of the state. They frequent the lower-elevation oak woodlands of the Sierra Nevada foothills and Coast Ranges, and the central coast north through Mendocino County, which is primarily open conifer forest with various species of ferns growing in the understory. They can also be found in the conifer foothills and fern-heavy forested areas of the Klamath Mountains and Cascade Range in the northern areas of the state. In San Diego County, turkeys tend to be found farther from the coast, usually a minimum of 30–50 miles inland, at reasonably higher elevation; there is a healthy turkey population inhabiting the montane conifer woods and open oak forest habitats of the Cleveland National Forest, a region which borders on high desert and generally receives very minimal annual precipitation. Turkeys in these areas can be found in dense thickets of manzanita (Arctostaphylos), often growing on arid hillsides, for shelter and nesting sites, as well as rocky and boulder-strewn chaparral foothills.

== Behavior ==
=== Flight ===
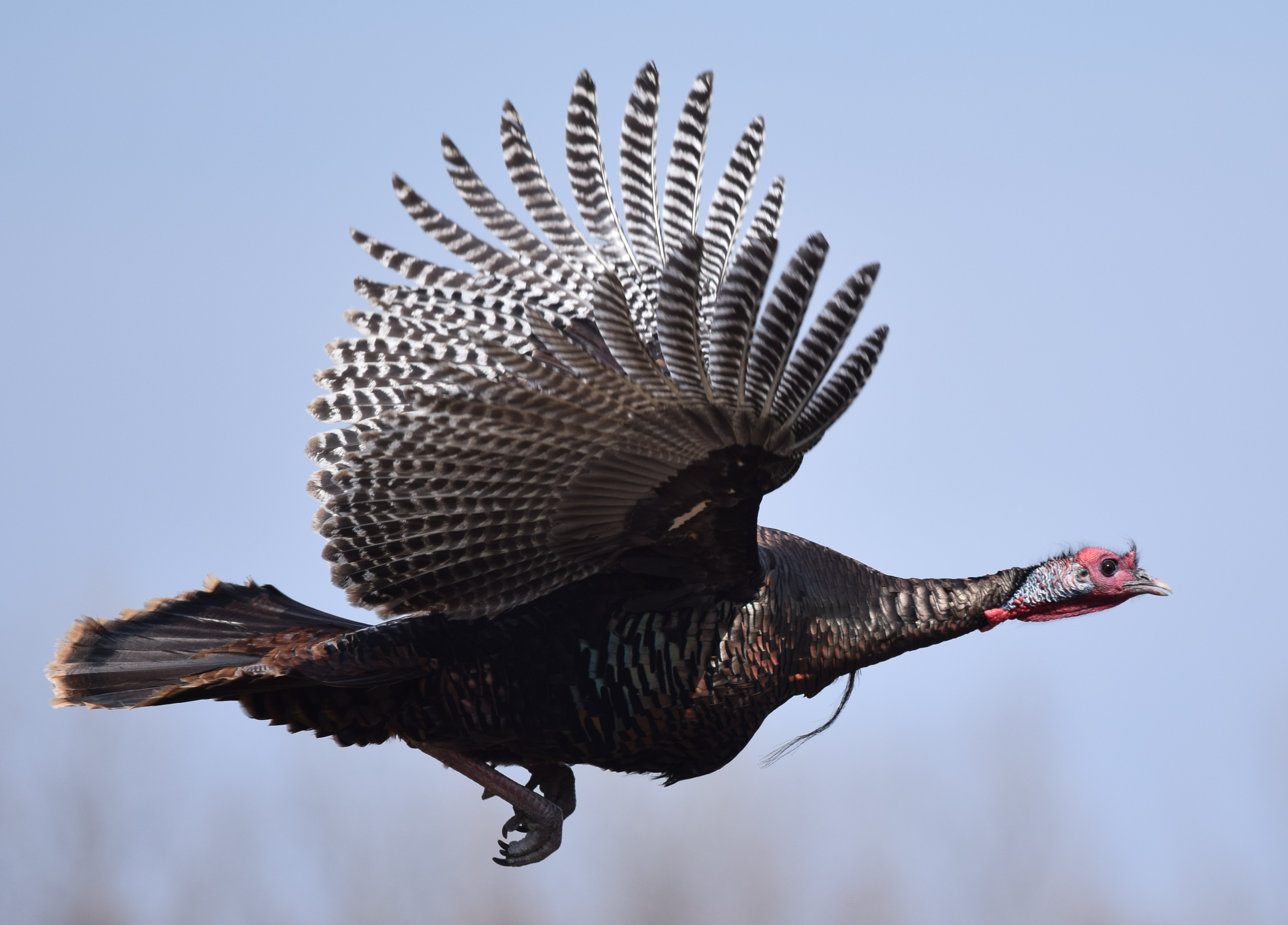
Wild turkey in flight

Despite their weight, wild turkeys, unlike their domesticated counterparts, are agile, fast fliers. In ideal habitat of open woodland or wooded grasslands, they may fly beneath the canopy top and find perches. They usually fly close to the ground for no more than 400 m (a quarter mile).

Wild turkeys have very good eyesight during the day. However, their vision is very poor at night so at twilight most turkeys will roost well off the ground in trees for safety. Because wild turkeys do not migrate, in snowier parts of the species's habitat like the Northeast, Rockies, much of Canada, and the Midwest, they shelter in conifer trees during blizzards.

=== Vocalizations ===
Male singing or “gobbling”

Wild turkeys have many calls: assembly call, gobble, plain yelp, purr, cluck and purr, cluck, cutt, excited yelp, fly-down cackle, tree call, kee kee run, and putt. In early spring, males older than a year old and, occasionally to a lesser extent, males younger than a year old gobble to announce their presence to females and competing males. The gobble of a wild turkey can be heard up to a mile away. In some seasons, gobbling is reduced as a result of weather; pressure, precipitation, and temperature are cited as being the three main weather-related reasons for a reduction in gobbling. Males also emit a low-pitched "drumming" sound, produced by the movement of air in the air sac in the chest, similar to the booming of a prairie chicken. In addition they produce a sound known as the "spit", which is a sharp expulsion of air from this air sac.

=== Foraging ===
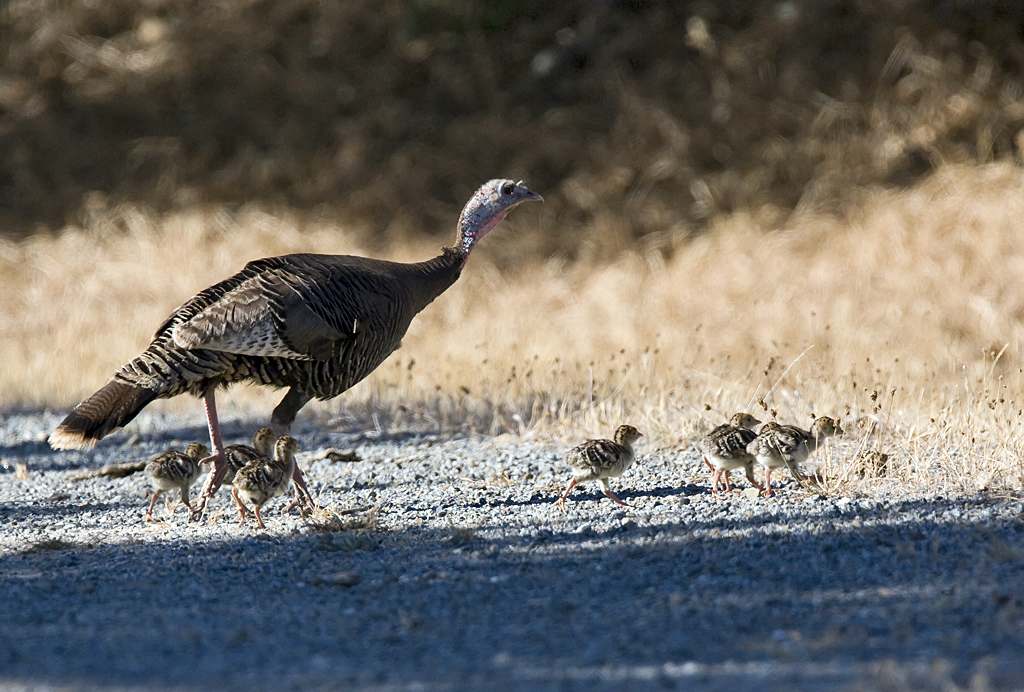
Hen with poults

Wild turkeys are omnivorous, foraging on the ground or climbing shrubs and small trees to feed. They prefer eating acorns, nuts, and other hard mast of various trees, including hazel, chestnut, hickory, and pinyon pine, as well as various seeds, berries such as juniper and bearberry, buds, leaves, fern fronds, roots, and insects. Turkeys also occasionally consume amphibians such as salamanders and small reptiles such as lizards and small snakes. Poults have been observed eating insects, berries, and seeds. Wild turkeys often feed in cow pastures, sometimes visit backyard bird feeders, and favor croplands after harvest to scavenge seeds on the ground. Turkeys are also known to eat a wide variety of grasses.

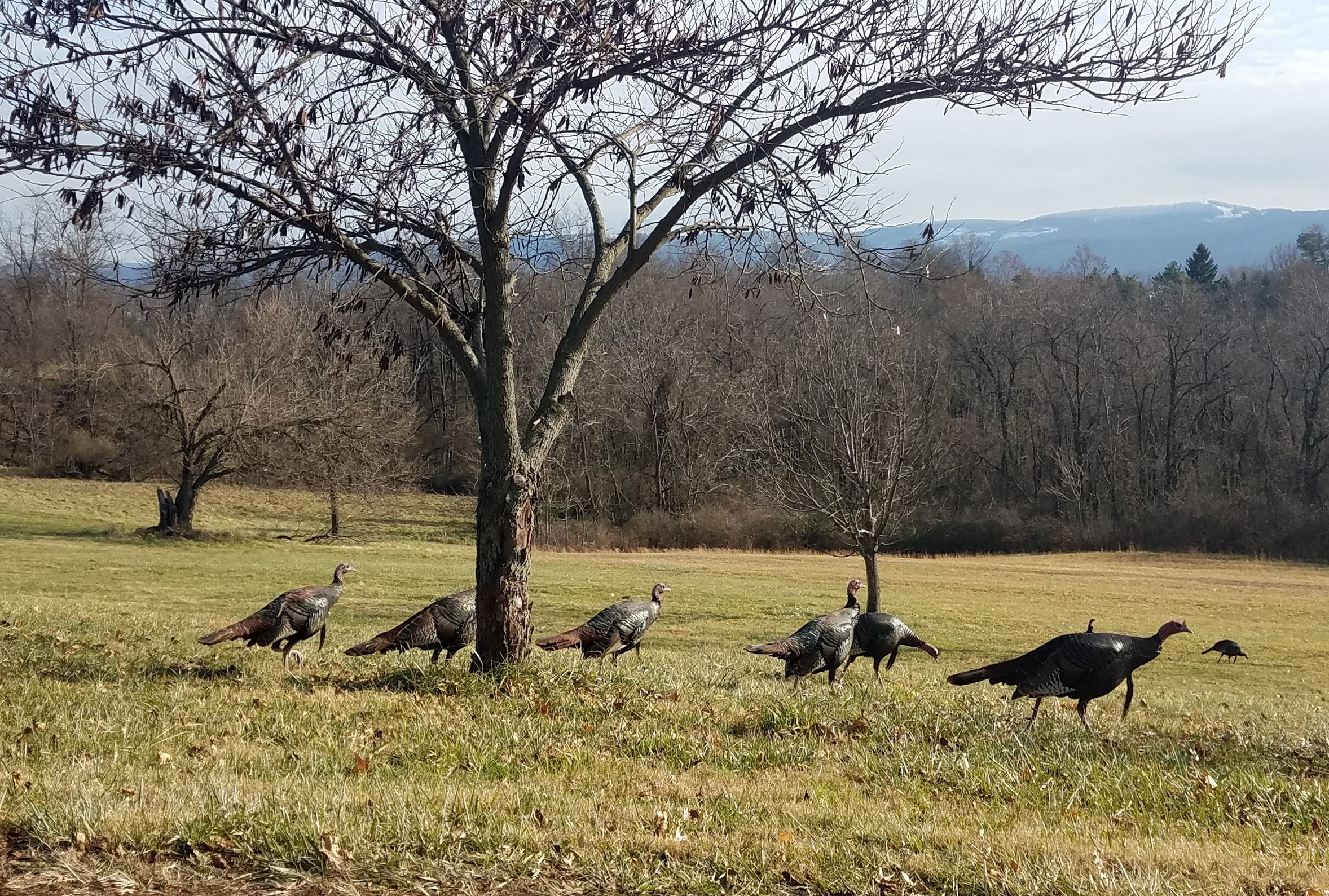
Wild turkeys foraging in the Appalachian Foothills of Pennsylvania

Turkey populations can reach large numbers in small areas because of their ability to forage for different types of food. Early morning and late afternoon are the desired times for eating.

=== Social structure and mating ===
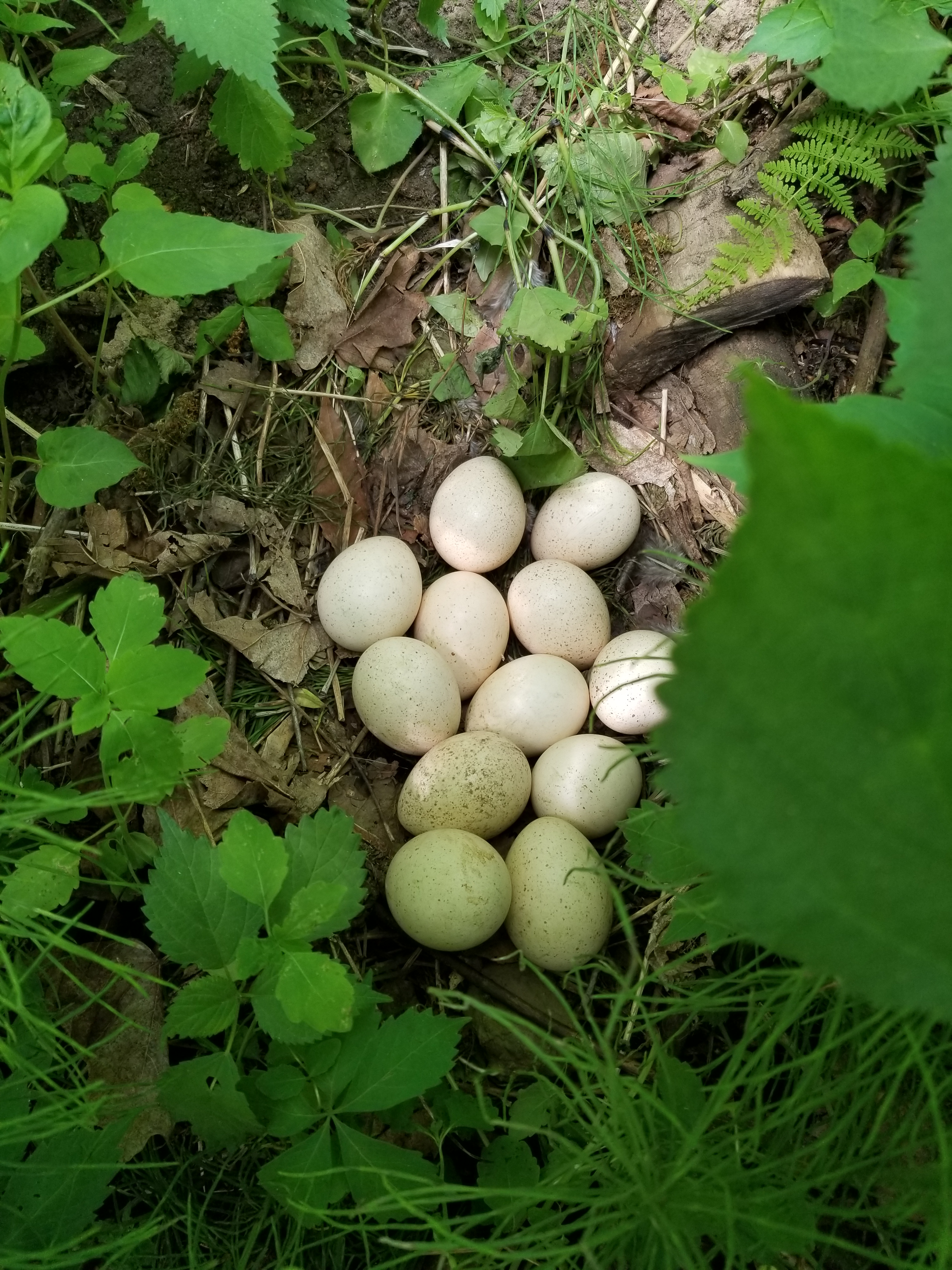
Nest in Ontario

Males are polygamous, mating with as many hens as they can. Male wild turkeys display for females by puffing out their feathers, spreading out their tails, and dragging their wings. This behavior is most commonly referred to as strutting. Their heads and necks are colored with red, white, and blue. The color can change with the turkey's mood, with a solid white head and neck being the most excited. They use gobbling, drumming/booming, and spitting as signs of social dominance, and to attract females. Courtship begins during the months of March and April, which is when turkeys are still flocked together in winter areas.

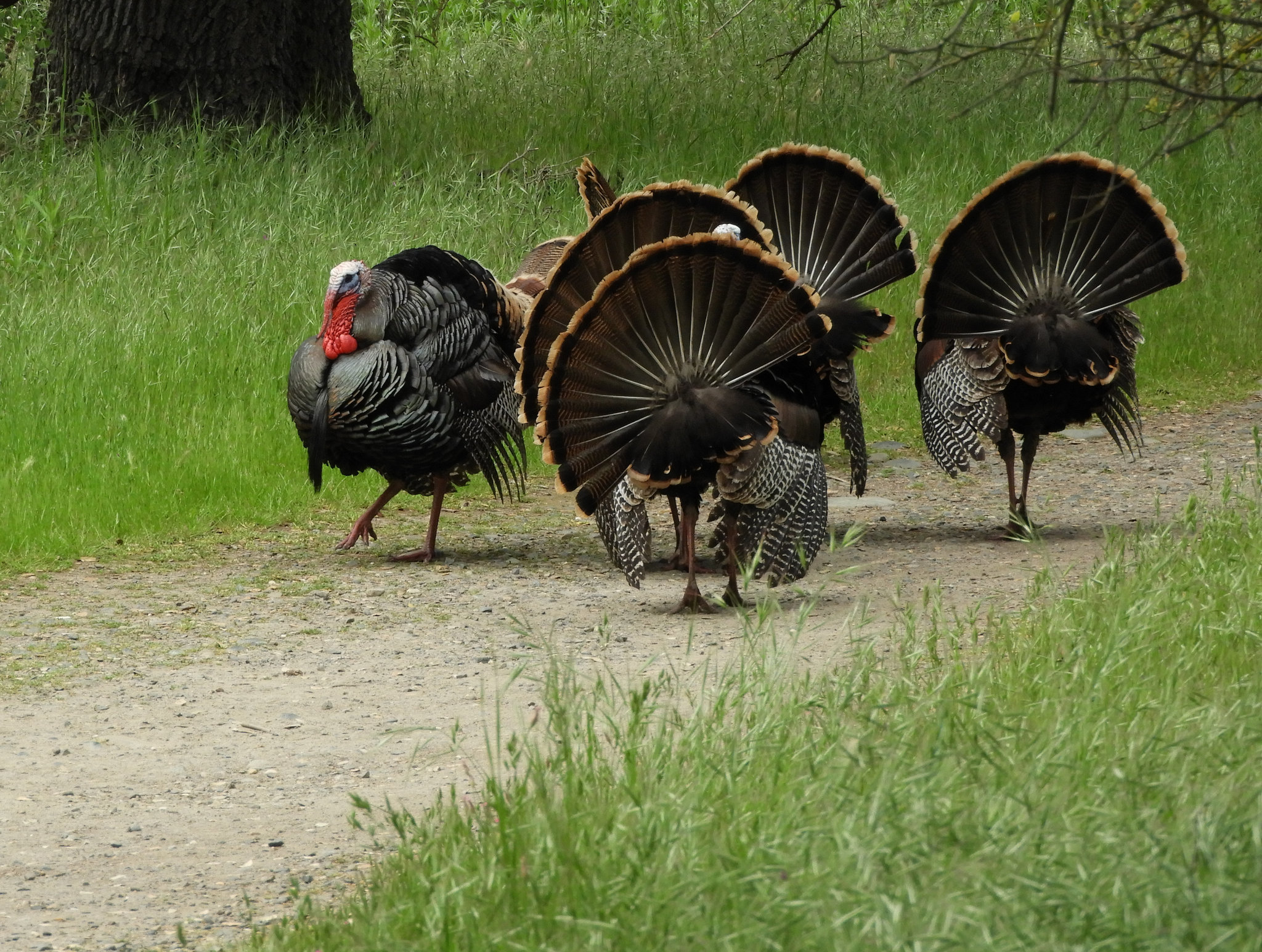
Tom M. g. intermedia courting in a group, at Sacramento County, California

Males may be seen courting in groups, often with the dominant male gobbling, spreading his tail feathers (strutting), drumming/booming, and spitting. In a study, the average dominant male that courted as part of a pair of males fathered six more eggs than males that courted alone. Genetic analysis of pairs of males courting together shows that they are close relatives, with half of their genetic material being identical. The theory behind team-courtship is that the less-dominant male has a greater chance of passing along shared genetic material than if he were courting alone.

When mating is finished, females search for nest sites. Nests are shallow dirt depressions engulfed with woody vegetation. Hens lay a clutch of 10–14 eggs, usually one per day. Eggs measure 4.9–6.9 cm (1.9–2.7 in) in length and 4.1–4.7 cm (1.6–1.9 in) in width. The eggs are incubated for at least 28 days. The poults are precocial and nidifugous, leaving the nest in about 12–24 hours. Turkeys are a ground nesting bird, and because of this they are heavily preyed on; reproductively-active wild turkeys have a lower annual survival rate due to predation of nests.

== Positive relationships with other wild species ==
Turkeys will occasionally forage with deer and squirrels, and may even play with them. By foraging together, each can help the other watch for predators with their different senses: the deer with their improved olfactory sense, the turkey with its superior sight, and squirrels providing an additional set of eyes from the air.

== Predators ==
Predators of eggs and nestlings include common ravens (Corvus corax), common crows (Corvus brachyrhynchos), Mexican long-nosed armadillos (Dasypus mexicanus), feral hogs (Sus scrofa), raccoons (Procyon lotor), Virginia opossums (Didelphis virginiana), striped skunks (Mephitis mephitis), eastern spotted skunks (Spilogale putorius), red foxes (Vulpes vulpes), gray foxes (Urocyon citnereoargenteus), groundhogs (Marmota monax), among other rodents. Predators of poults in addition to nestlings and eggs also include several species of snake, namely coachwhips (Mastiocophis flagellum), black rat snakes (Pantherophis obsoletus), corn snakes (Pantherophis guttatus), and eastern pine snakes (Pituophis melanoleucus).

Avian predators of poults include raptors such as bald eagles (Haliaeetus leucocephalus), barred owl (Strix varia), red-shouldered (Buteo lineatus), red-tailed (Buteo jamaicensis), white-tailed (Geranoaetus albicaudatus), Harris's hawks (Parabuteo unicinctus), Cooper's hawk (Astur cooperii), and broad-winged hawk (Buteo platypterus) (both likely of very small poults). Mortality of poults is greatest in the first 14 days of life, especially of those roosting on the ground, decreasing most notably after half a year, when they attain near adult sizes.

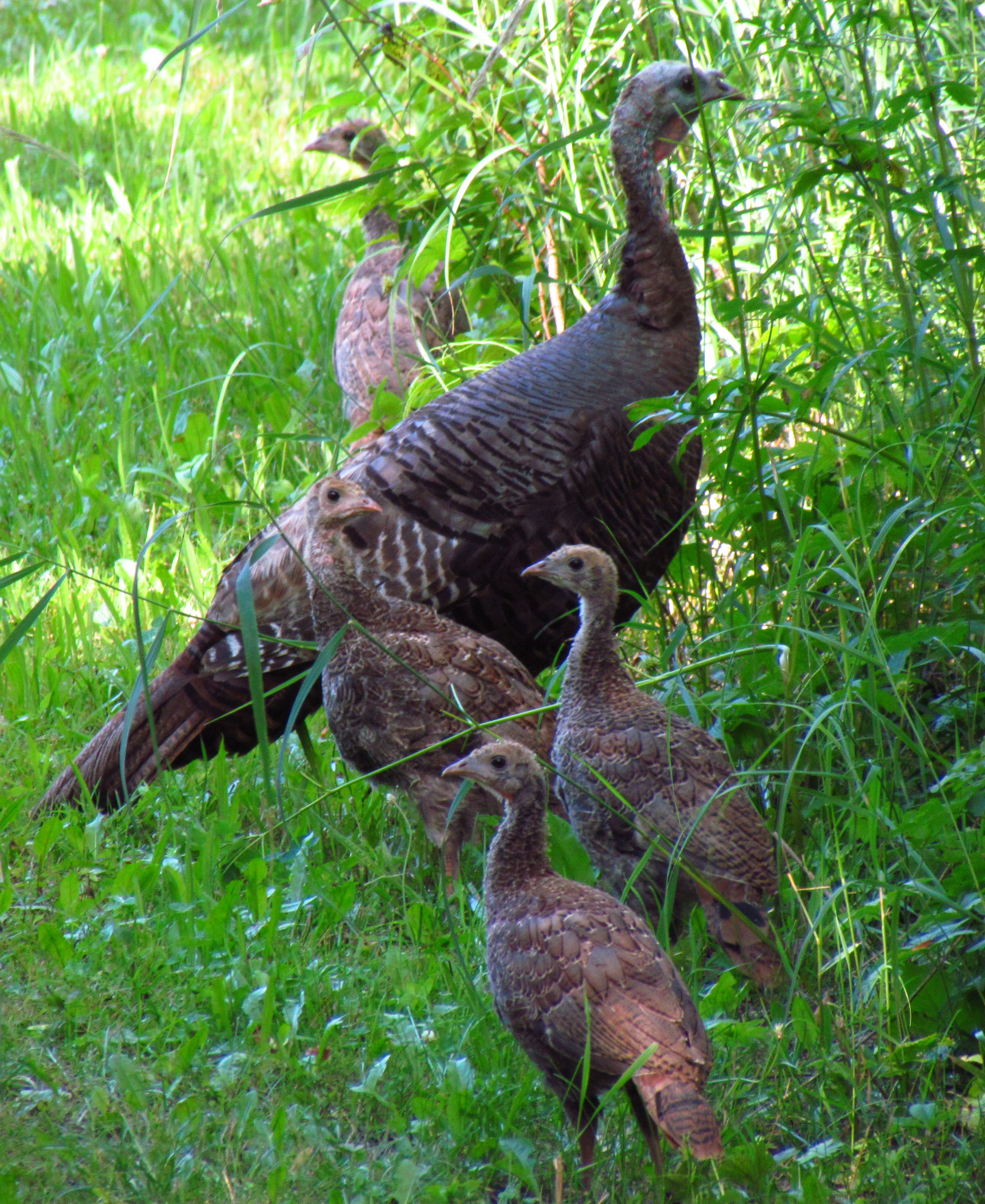
Hen with juveniles

In addition to poults, hens and adult-sized fledglings (but not, as far as is known, adult male toms) are vulnerable to predation by great horned owls (Bubo virginianus), American goshawk (Astur atricapillus), domestic dogs (Canis familiaris), domestic cats (Felis catus), and red foxes (Vulpes vulpes). Predators of both adults and poults include coyotes (Canis latrans), gray wolves (Canis lupus), bobcats (Lynx rufus), cougars (Puma concolor), Canada lynx (Lynx canadensis), golden eagles (Aquila chrysaetos), and possibly American black bears (Ursus americanus), which also will eat the eggs if they find them. The American alligator (Alligator mississippiensis) is a predator to all turkeys of all ages in the Southeast and will eat them if they get too close to water. Humans are now the leading predator of adult turkeys. When approached by potential predators, turkeys and their poults usually run rather than fly away, though they may also fly short distances if pressed. Another alternative behaviour, common in Galliformes, is that when surprised with no time to flee, the poults hide under the wings and body of the hen while she sits tight and still. Presumably, the hen has vocal and behavioural signals that trigger the poults to instinctively run to the hen for cover.

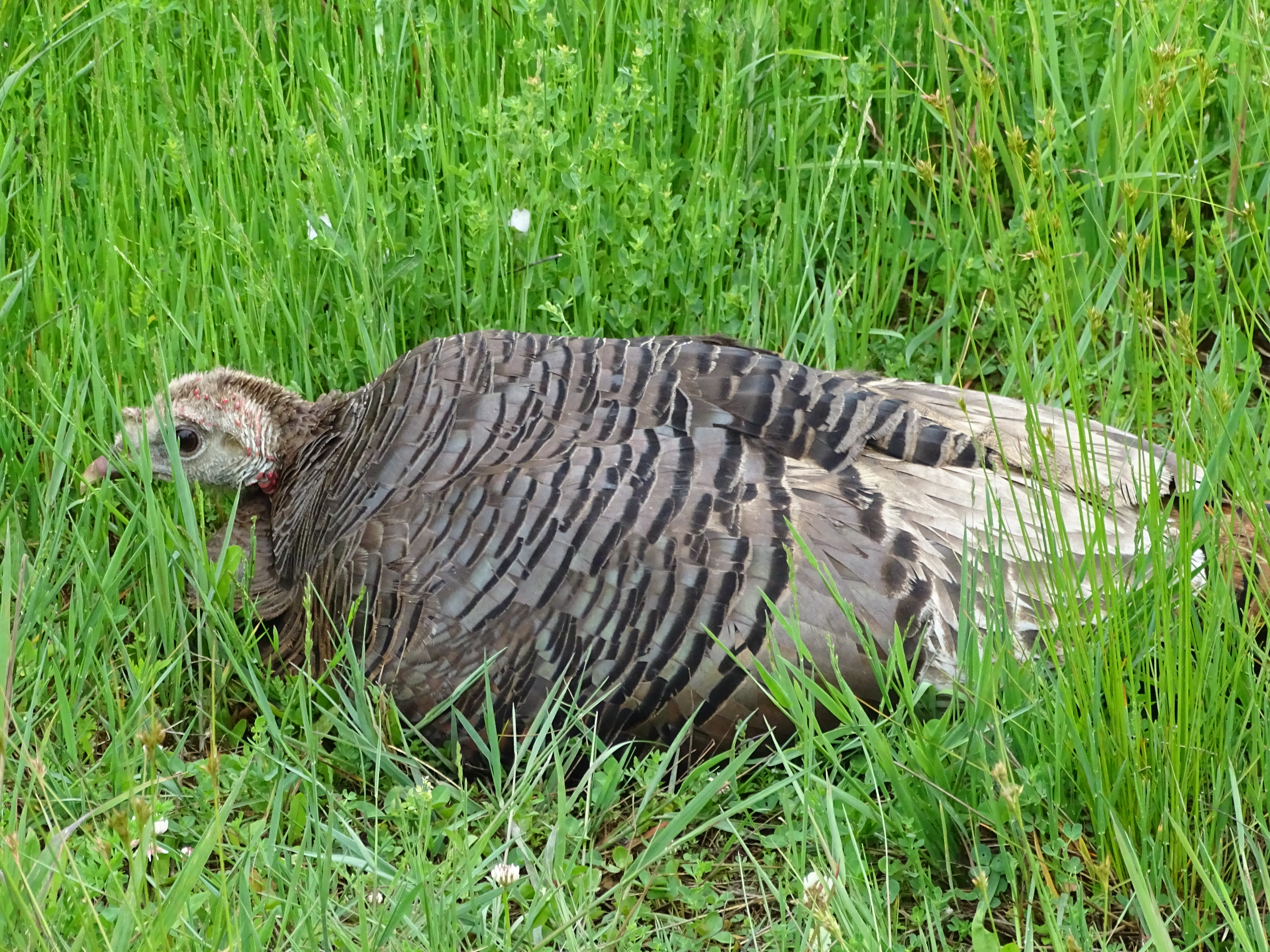
A hen caught in the open hides her young poults beneath her wings and body.

Occasionally, if cornered, adult turkeys may try to fight off predators and large male toms can be especially aggressive in self-defense. When fighting off predators, turkeys may kick with their legs, using the spurs on their back of the legs as a weapon, bite with their beak, and ram with their relatively large bodies and may be able to deter predators up to the size of mid-sized mammals. Hens have been observed chasing off at least two species of hawks in flight when their poults are threatened.

Wild turkeys are not usually aggressive towards humans, but can be frightened or provoked to behave with aggression. They are most likely to attack if startled, cornered, harassed, or if approached too closely. Attacks and potential injuries can usually be avoided by giving wild turkeys a respectful amount of space and keeping outdoor spaces clean and undisturbed. Also, turkeys that are habituated to seeing people, at places like parks or campgrounds, can be tame and will even feed from the hands of people. Male toms occasionally will attack parked cars and reflective surfaces, thinking they see another turkey and must defend their territory.

== Range and population ==
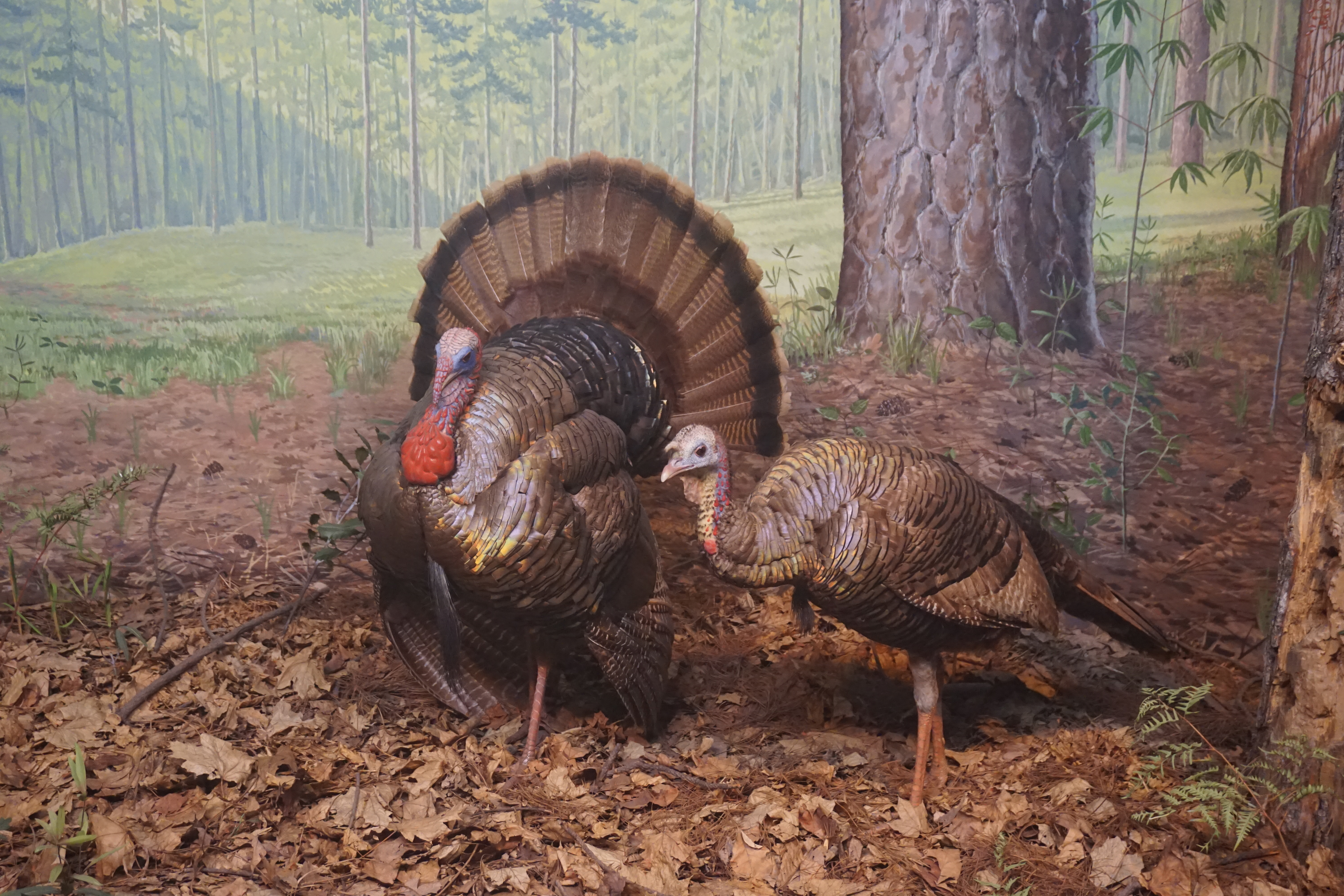
A Bird of the Deciduous Forest, Wild Turkey, Georgia diorama at the Milwaukee Public Museum

At the beginning of the 20th century the range and numbers of wild turkeys had plummeted due to overhunting and habitat loss. When Europeans arrived in the New World, they were found from the southeastern US to Mexico. Turkeys were first domesticated by native peoples in Mexico and brought back to Europe during colonization. European settlers brought domesticated turkeys to the northern portions of North America during the 17th century. Habitat loss and market hunting were major factors in the decline of wild populations for the next two centuries.

Game managers estimate that the entire population of wild turkeys in the United States was as low as 30,000 by the late 1930s. By the 1940s, it was almost totally extirpated from Canada and had become localized in pockets in the United States, in the north-east effectively restricted to the Appalachians, only as far north as central Pennsylvania. Prior to reintroduction efforts, wild turkeys became extinct in 18 US states. New York and Vermont lost their wild turkey populations in the 1850s, and the species was locally extinct for over a century in some areas.

Early attempts at reintroduction used hand-reared birds, but human influence resulted in the birds being unable to survive in the wild. Game officials later made efforts to protect and encourage the breeding of the surviving wild population. They would wait for numbers to grow, catch the surplus birds with a device that would have a projectile net that would ensnare the creature, move it to another unoccupied territory, and repeat the cycle. Over time this included some in the western states where it was not native. There is evidence that the bird does well when near farmland, which provides grain and also berry-bearing shrubs at its edges. As wild turkey numbers rebounded, hunting became legal in 49 U.S. states (excluding Alaska). In 1973, the total U.S. population was estimated to be 1.3 million, and current estimates place the entire wild turkey population at 7 million individuals. Since the 1980s, "trap and transfer" projects have reintroduced wild turkeys to several provinces of Canada as well, sometimes from across the border in the United States. They appear to be very successful as of 2018 as wild turkeys have multiplied rapidly and flourished in places where they were not expected to survive by Canadian scientists, often quite far north of their original expected range.

Attempts to introduce the wild turkey to Britain as a game bird in the 18th century were unsuccessful. (Note: These birds were imported from Mexico, then called the Spanish West Indies. They did not come from Turkey or India, as was widely believed.) George II is said to have kept a flock of a few thousand in Richmond Park near London, but they were too easy for local poachers to steal, and the fights with poachers became too dangerous for the gamekeepers. They were hunted with dogs and then shot out of trees where they took refuge. Several other populations, introduced or escaped, have survived for periods elsewhere in Britain and Ireland, but seem to have died out, perhaps from a combination of lack of winter feed and poaching. Small populations, probably descended from farm as well as wild stock, in the Czech Republic and Germany have been more successful, and there are wild populations of some size following introductions in Hawaii and New Zealand.

The Californian turkey (Meleagris californica) is an extinct species of turkey indigenous to the Pleistocene and early Holocene of California. It became extinct about 10,000 years ago. The present Californian wild turkey population derives from wild turkeys introduced to the region during the 1960s and 1970s from other areas by game officials. They proliferated after 2000 to become an everyday sight in the East Bay by 2015.

== Subspecies ==
There are subtle differences in the coloration, habitat, and behavior of the different subspecies of wild turkeys. The six subspecies are:

=== Eastern wild turkey (Meleagris gallopavo silvestris) ===
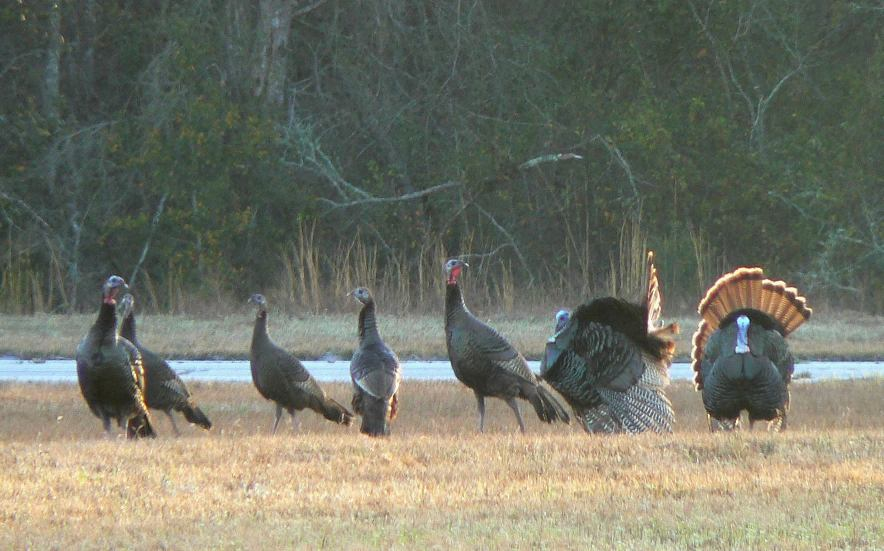
Eastern wild turkey

This was the turkey subspecies Europeans first encountered in the wild: by the Puritans, the founders of Jamestown, the Dutch who lived in New York, and by the Acadians. Its range is one of the largest of all subspecies, covering the entire eastern half of the United States from Maine in the north to northern Florida and extending as far west as Minnesota, Illinois, and into Missouri. In Canada, its range extends into Southeastern Manitoba, Ontario, Southwestern Quebec (including Pontiac, Quebec and the lower half of the Western Quebec Seismic Zone), and the Maritime Provinces. They number from 5.1 to 5.3 million birds. They were first named 'forest turkey' in 1817, and can grow up to 4 ft (1.2 m) tall. The upper tail coverts are tipped with chestnut brown. Males can reach 30 lb (14 kg) in weight. The eastern wild turkey is heavily hunted in the Eastern USA and is the most hunted wild turkey subspecies.

=== Osceola wild turkey or Florida wild turkey (Meleagris gallopavo osceola) ===
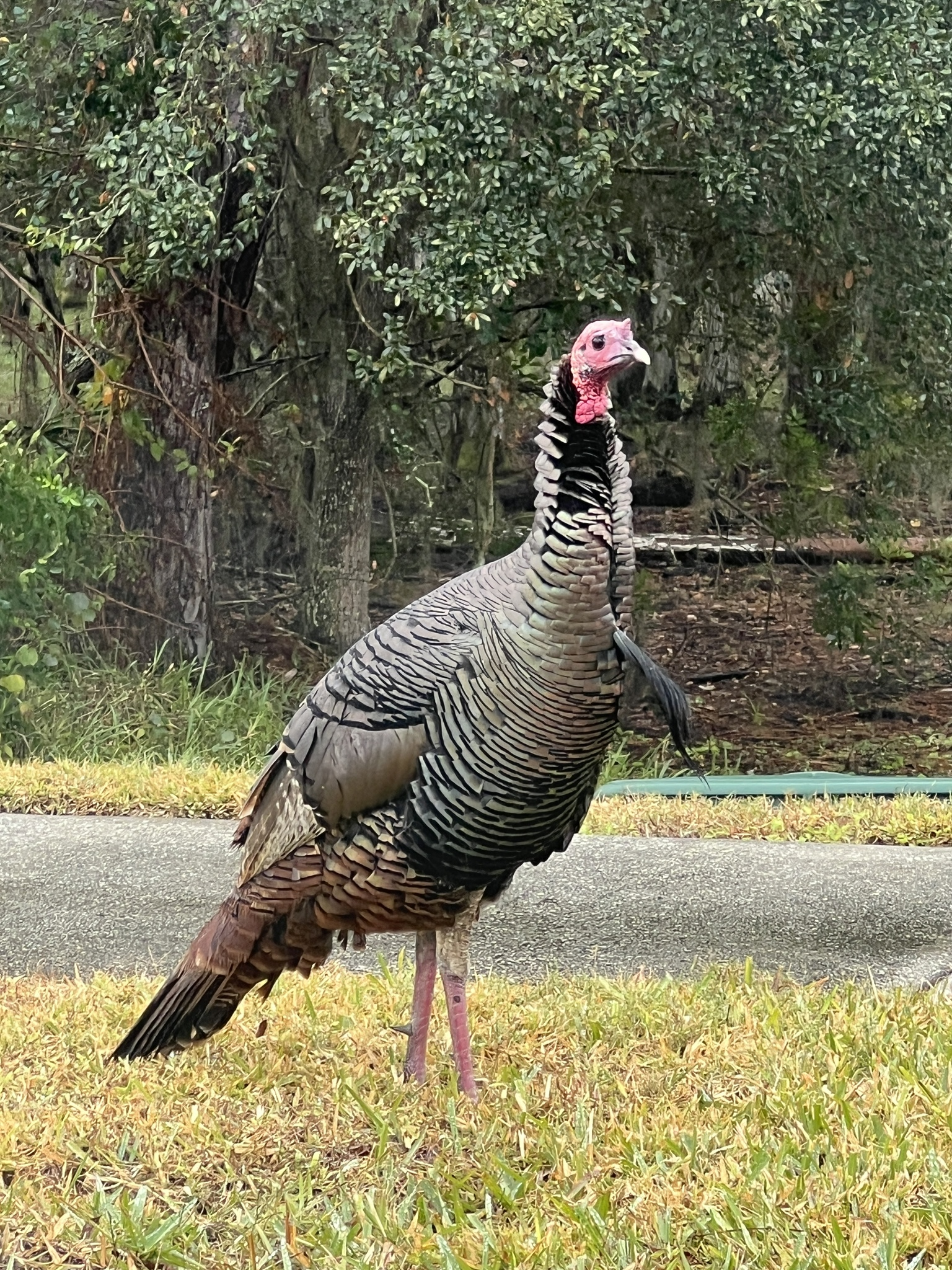
M. g. osceola in Florida

Most common in the Florida peninsula, they number from 80,000 to 100,000 birds. This bird is named for the famous Seminole leader Osceola, and was first described in 1890. It is smaller and darker than the eastern wild turkey. The wing feathers are very dark with smaller amounts of the white barring seen on other subspecies. Their overall body feathers are an iridescent green-purple color. They are often found in scrub patches of palmetto and occasionally near swamps, where amphibian prey is abundant. Osceola turkeys are the smallest subspecies weighing 16 to 18 pounds (7 to 8 kg).

=== Rio Grande wild turkey (Meleagris gallopavo intermedia) ===
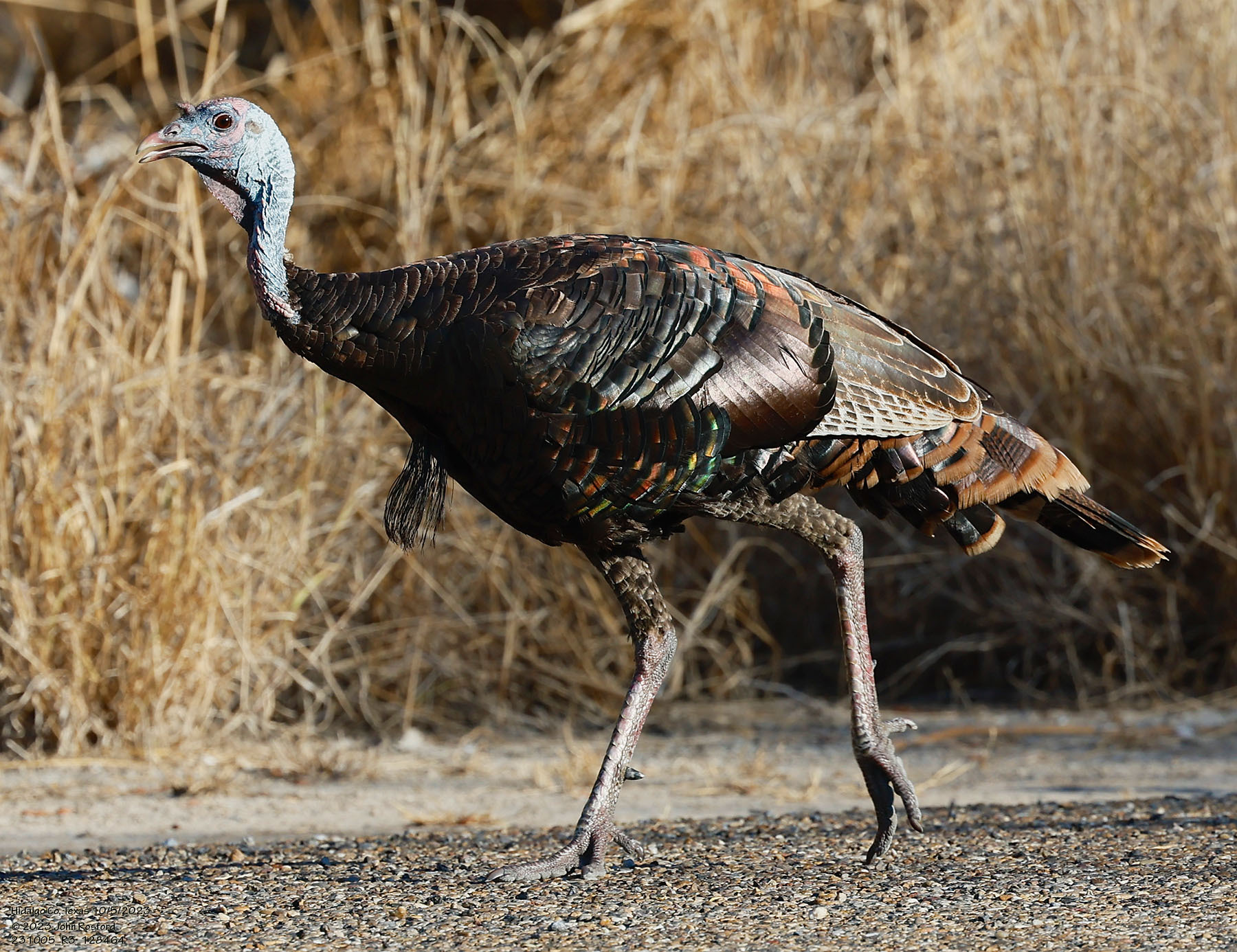
M. g. intermedia have relatively long legs.

The Rio Grande wild turkey ranges through Texas to Oklahoma, Kansas, New Mexico, Colorado, Oregon, Utah, and was introduced to central and western California, as well as parts of a few northeastern states. It was also introduced to Hawaiʻi in the late 1950s. Population estimates for this subspecies are around 1,000,000. This subspecies, native to the central plain states, was first described in 1879, and has relatively long legs, better adapted to a prairie habitat. Its body feathers often have a green-coppery sheen. The tips of the tail and lower back feathers are a buff-to-very light tan color. Its habitats are brush areas next to streams, rivers or mesquite, pine and scrub oak forests. The Rio Grande turkey is gregarious.

=== Merriam's wild turkey (Meleagris gallopavo merriami) ===
The Merriam's wild turkey ranges through the Rocky Mountains and the neighboring prairies of Wyoming, Montana and South Dakota, as well as much of the high mesa country of New Mexico, Arizona, southern Utah and the Navajo Nation, with number from 334,460 to 344,460 birds. The subspecies has also been introduced into Oregon. The initial releases of Merriam's turkeys in 1961 resulted in establishing a remnant population of Merriam's turkeys along the east-slope of Mt. Hood and natural immigration of turkeys from Idaho has established Merriam's flocks along the eastern border of Oregon. Merriam's wild turkeys live in ponderosa pine and mountainous regions. The subspecies was named in 1900 in honor of Clinton Hart Merriam, the first chief of the U.S. Biological Survey. The tail and lower back feathers have white tips and purple and bronze reflections.

=== Gould's wild turkey (Meleagris gallopavo mexicana) ===
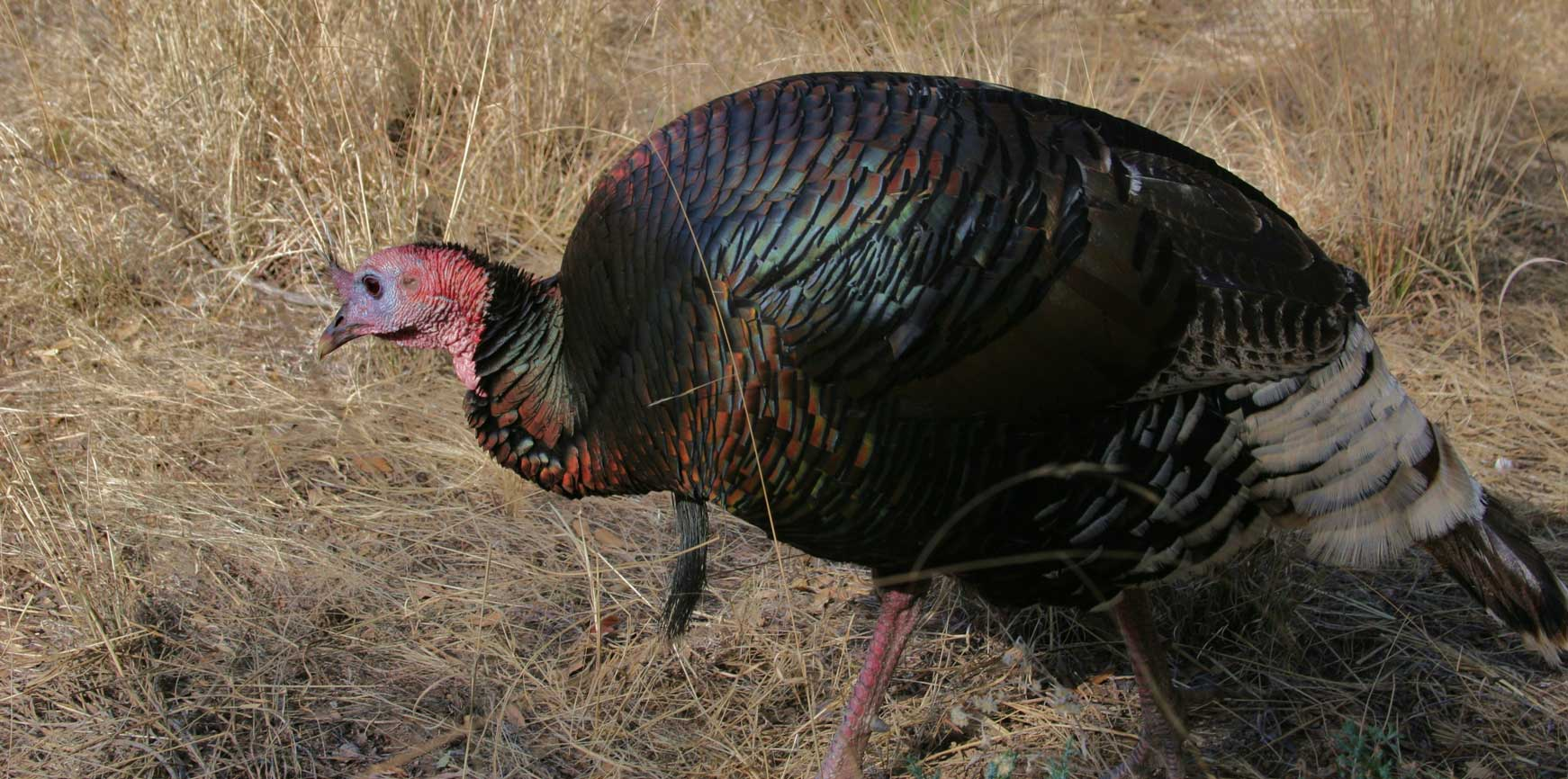
Gould's wild turkey

Native from the central valleys to the northern mountains of Mexico and the southernmost parts of Arizona and New Mexico. Gould's wild turkeys are heavily protected and regulated. The subspecies was first described in 1856. They exist in small numbers in the U.S. but are abundant in northwestern portions of Mexico. A small population has been established in southern Arizona. Gould's are the largest of the six subspecies. They have longer legs, larger feet, and longer tail feathers. The main colors of the body feathers are copper and greenish-gold. This subspecies is heavily protected owing to its skittish nature and threatened status.

=== South Mexican wild turkey (Meleagris gallopavo gallopavo) ===
The south Mexican wild turkey is considered the nominate subspecies, and the only one that is not found in the United States or Canada. In central Mexico, archaeological M. gallopavo bones have been identified at sites dating to 800–100 BC. It is unclear whether these early specimens represent wild or domestic individuals, but domestic turkeys were likely established in central Mexico by the first half of the Classic Period (c. AD 200–1000). Late Preclassic (300 BC–AD 100) turkey remains identified at the archaeological site of El Mirador (Petén, Guatemala) represent the earliest evidence of the export of the south Mexican wild turkey (Meleagris gallopavo gallopavo) to the ancient Maya world. The south Mexican wild subspecies, M. g. gallopavo, was domesticated either in Mexico or by Preclassic peoples in Mesoamerica, giving rise to the domestic turkey (M. g. domesticus). The Spaniards brought this tamed subspecies back to Europe with them in the mid-16th century; from Spain it spread to France and later Britain as a farmyard animal, usually becoming the centerpiece of a feast for the well-to-do. By 1620 it was common enough so that Pilgrim settlers of Massachusetts could bring turkeys with them from England, unaware that it had a larger close relative already occupying the forests of Massachusetts. It is one of the smallest subspecies and is best known in Spanish from its Aztec-derived name, guajolote. This wild turkey subspecies is thought to be critically endangered, as of 2010.

Female wild turkey with young from Birds of America by John James Audubon

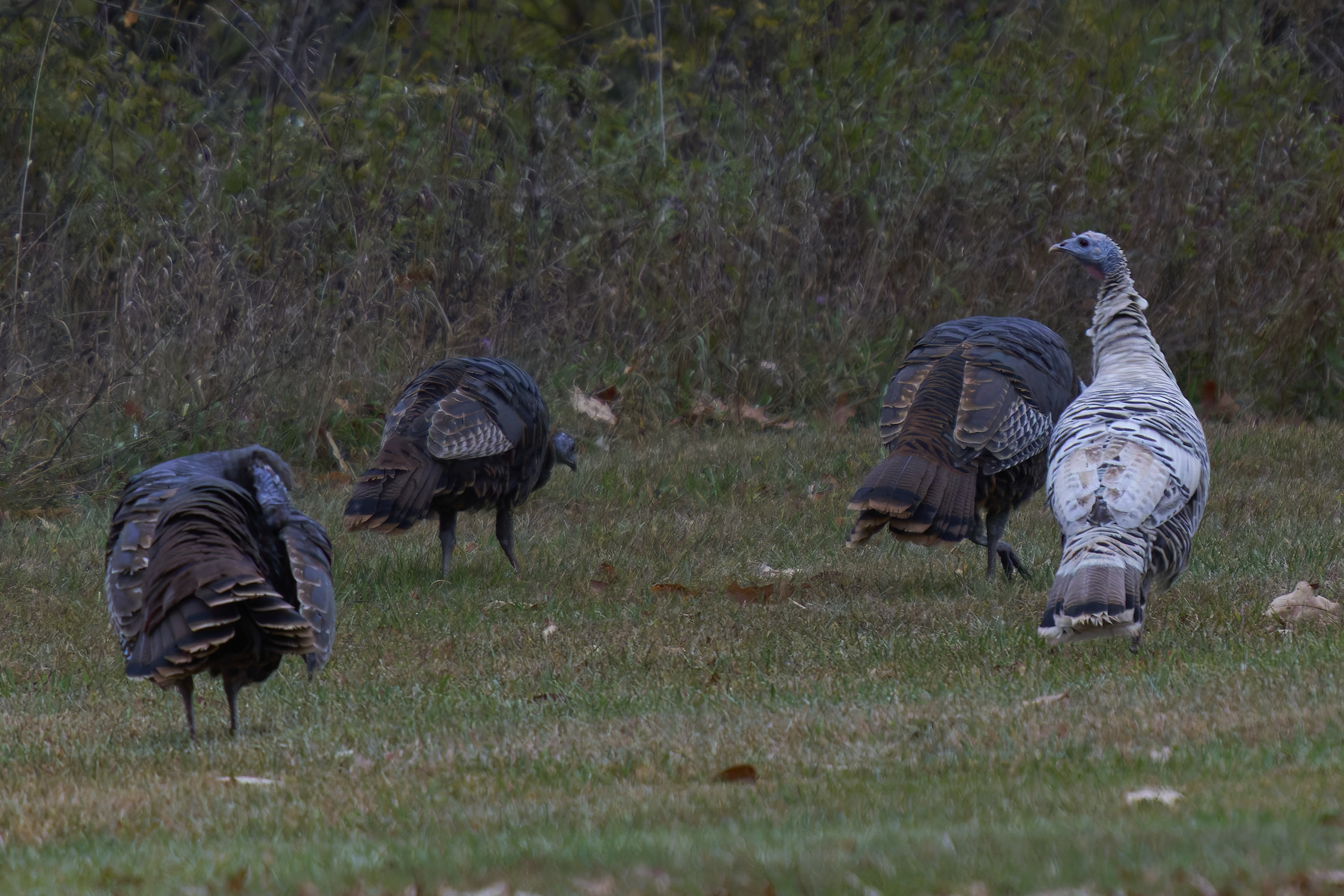
Smoke-morph wild turkey (right), a relatively rare color morph almost exclusively manifested in females

== Benjamin Franklin and the myth of U.S. national bird suggestion ==
The idea that Benjamin Franklin preferred the turkey as the national bird of the United States comes from a letter he wrote to his daughter Sarah Bache on 26 January 1784. The main subject of the letter is a criticism of the Society of the Cincinnati, which he likened to a chivalric order and felt contradicted the ideals of the newly founded American republic. In one section of the letter, Franklin remarked on the appearance of the bald eagle on the Society's crest:

Others object to the Bald Eagle, as looking too much like a Dindon, or Turkey. For my own part I wish the Bald Eagle had not been chosen the Representative of our Country. He is a Bird of bad moral Character. He does not get his Living honestly. You may have seen him perched on some dead Tree near the River, where, too lazy to fish for himself, he watches the Labour of the Fishing Hawk [osprey]; and when that diligent Bird has at length taken a Fish, and is bearing it to his Nest for the Support of his Mate and young Ones, the Bald Eagle pursues him and takes it from him. With all this Injustice, he is never in good Case but like those among Men who live by Sharping & Robbing he is generally poor and often very lousy. Besides he is a rank Coward: The little King Bird not bigger than a Sparrow attacks him boldly and drives him out of the District. He is therefore by no means a proper Emblem for the brave and honest Cincinnati of America who have driven all the King birds from our Country ...

I am on this account not displeased that the Figure is not known as a Bald Eagle, but looks more like a Turkey. For in Truth the Turkey is in Comparison a much more respectable Bird, and withal a true original Native of America ... He is besides, though a little vain & silly, a Bird of Courage, and would not hesitate to attack a Grenadier of the British Guards who should presume to invade his Farm Yard with a red Coat on.

Franklin never publicly voiced opposition to the bald eagle as a national symbol, nor did he ever publicly suggest the turkey as a national symbol. The story has been called a myth.

== Significance to Native Americans ==
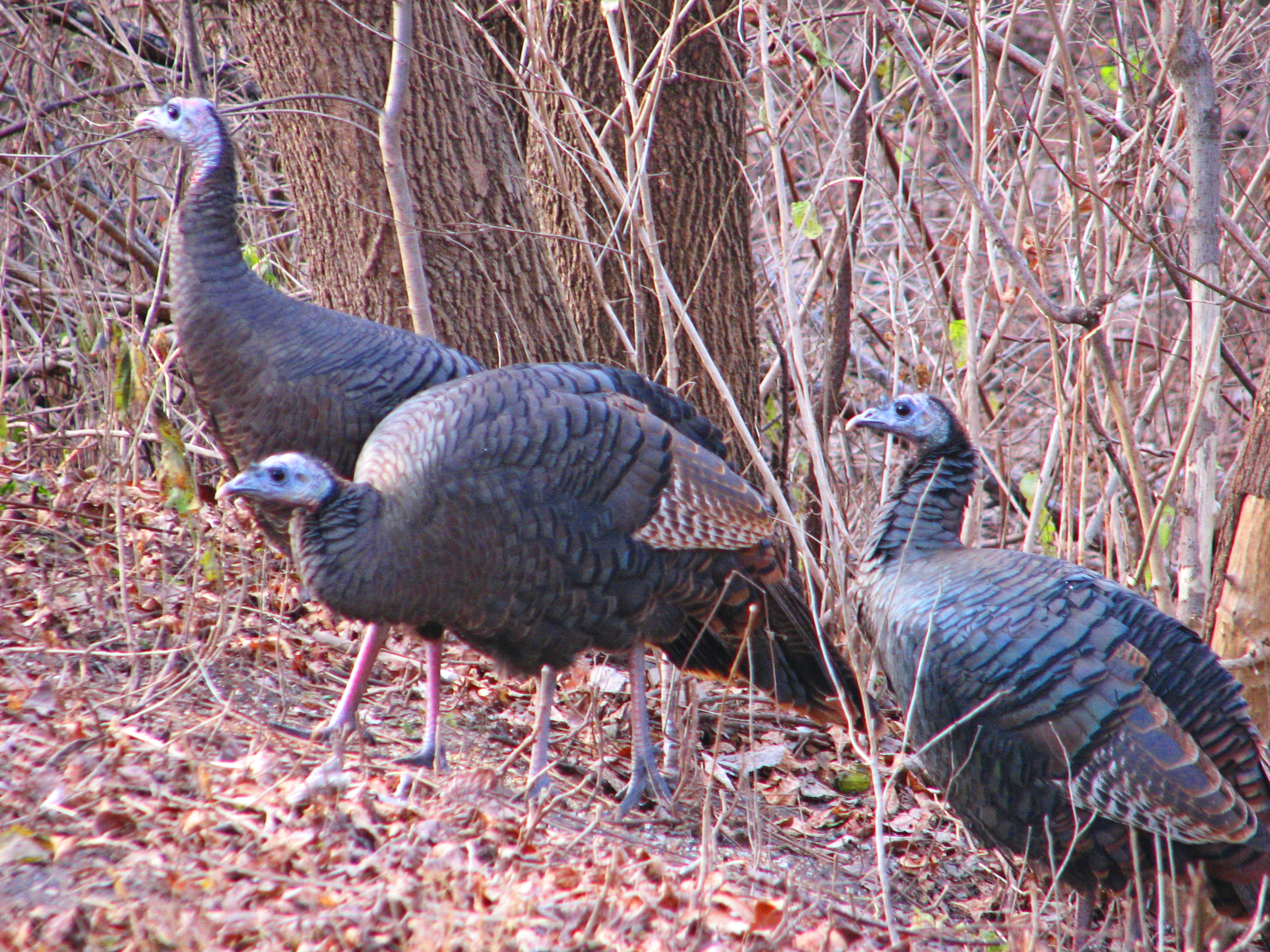
Eastern wild turkey (M. g. silvestris) hens

The wild turkey, throughout its range, plays a significant role in the cultures of many Native American tribes all over North America. It is a favorite meal in eastern tribes. Eastern Native American tribes consumed both the eggs and meat, sometimes turning the latter into a type of jerky to preserve it and make it last through cold weather. They provided habitat by burning down portions of forests to create meadows which would attract mating birds, and thus give a clear shot to hunters. The feathers of turkeys also often made their way into the rituals and headgear of many tribes. Many leaders, such as Catawba chiefs, traditionally wore turkey feather headdresses.

Significant peoples of several tribes, including Muscogee Creek and Wampanoag, wore turkey feather cloaks. The turkey clan is one of the three Lenape clans. Movements of wild turkeys inspired the Caddo tribe's turkey dance. The Navajo people of Northeastern Arizona, New Mexico and Utah call the turkey Tązhii and relate the bird to the corn and seeds which The Turkey in Navajo folklore brought from the Third Navajo World. It is one of the Navajos' sacred birds, with the Navajo people using the feathers and parts in multiple traditional ceremonies.

== See also ==
- Heritage turkey
- Turkeypox virus
