= Nickel silver =

Shiny alloy of copper, nickel, and zinc

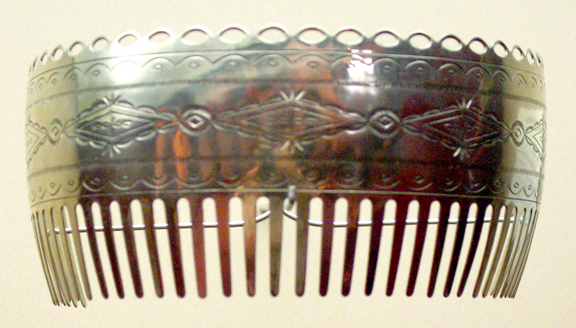
"German silver" hair comb, made 1984

Nickel silver, maillechort, German silver, argentan, new silver, nickel brass, albata, or alpacca is a cupronickel (copper with nickel) alloy with the addition of zinc. The usual formulation is 60% copper, 20% nickel and 20% zinc. Nickel silver does not contain silver, but resembles it, which can make it attractive as a cheaper and more durable substitute. It is also well suited for plating with silver because of its very similar colour, which makes any areas where the silver plating inevitably becomes worn through with use much less obvious.

A naturally occurring ore composition in China was smelted into the alloy known as paktong or báitóng (白銅) ('white copper' or cupronickel). The name German Silver refers to the artificial recreation of the natural ore composition by German metallurgists. All modern, commercially important, nickel silvers (such as those standardized under ASTM B122) contain zinc and are sometimes considered a variety of brass.

== History ==
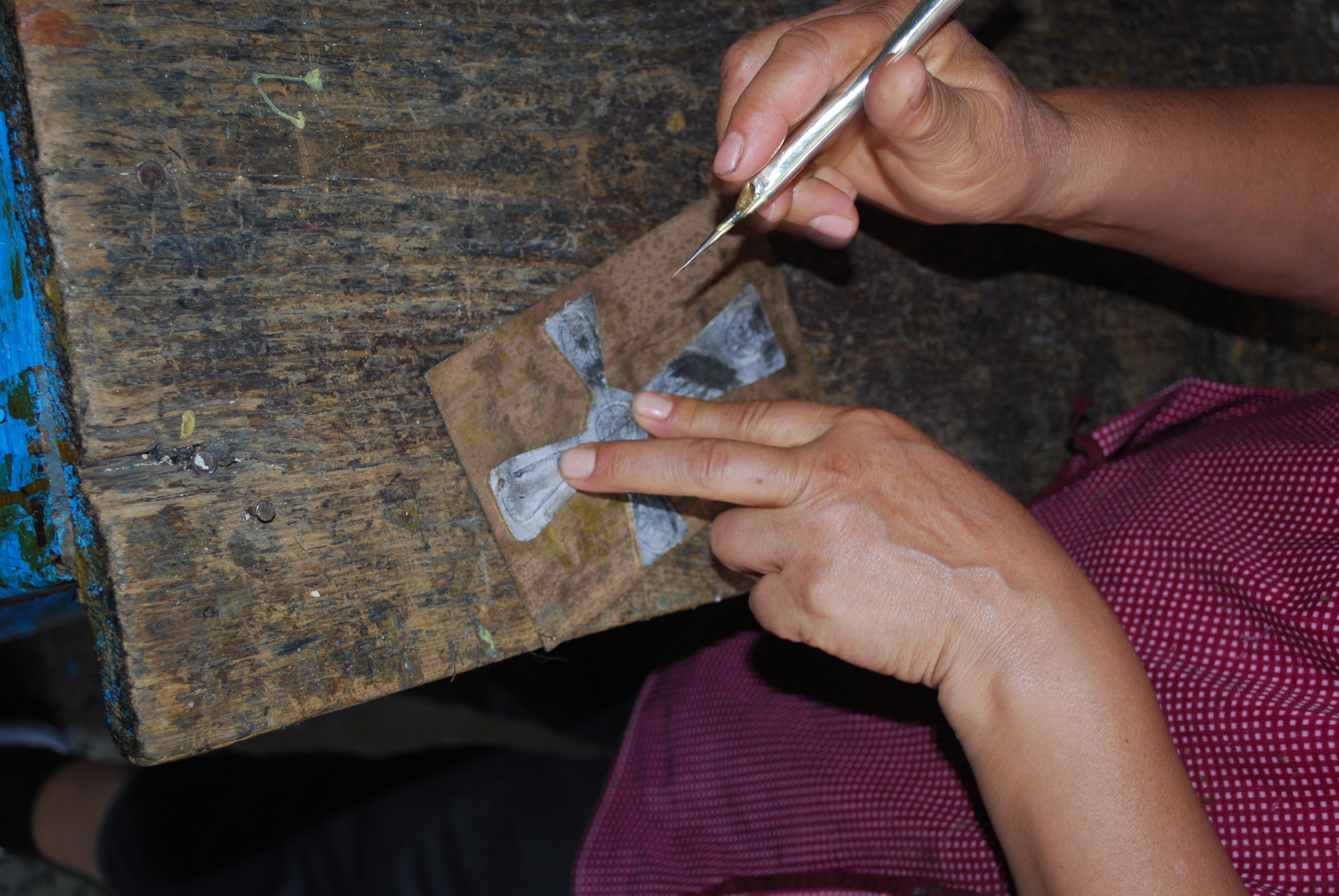
Tracing a cross onto a piece of crude nickel silver at a workshop in San Miguel Allende, Guanajuato, Mexico

Nickel silver was first used in China, where it was smelted from readily available unprocessed ore. During the Qing dynasty, it was "smuggled into various parts of the East Indies", despite a government ban on the export of nickel silver. It became known in the West from imported wares called baitong (Mandarin) or paktong (Cantonese) (白 銅, literally "white copper"), for which the silvery metal colour was used to imitate sterling silver. According to Berthold Laufer, it was identical to khar sini, one of the seven metals recognized by Jābir ibn Hayyān.

In Europe, consequently, it was at first called paktong, which is about the way baitong is pronounced in the Cantonese language. The earliest European mention of paktong occurs in the year 1597. From then until the end of the eighteenth century there are references to it as having been exported from Canton to Europe.

German artificial recreation of the natural paktong ore composition, however, began to appear from about 1750 onward. In 1770, the Suhl metalworks were able to produce a similar alloy. In 1823, a German competition was held to perfect the production process: the goal was to develop an alloy that possessed the closest visual similarity to silver. The brothers Henniger in Berlin and Ernst August Geitner in Schneeberg independently achieved this goal. The manufacturer Berndorf (founded in 1843) named the trademark brand Alpacca, which became widely known in northern Europe for nickel silver. In 1830, the German process of manufacture was introduced into England, while exports of paktong from China gradually stopped. In 1832, a form of German silver was also developed in Birmingham, England.

After the modern process for the production of electroplated nickel silver was patented in 1840 by George Richards Elkington and his cousin Henry Elkington in Birmingham, the development of electroplating caused nickel silver to become widely used. It formed an ideal, strong and bright substrate for the plating process. It was also used unplated in applications such as cutlery.

== Uses ==
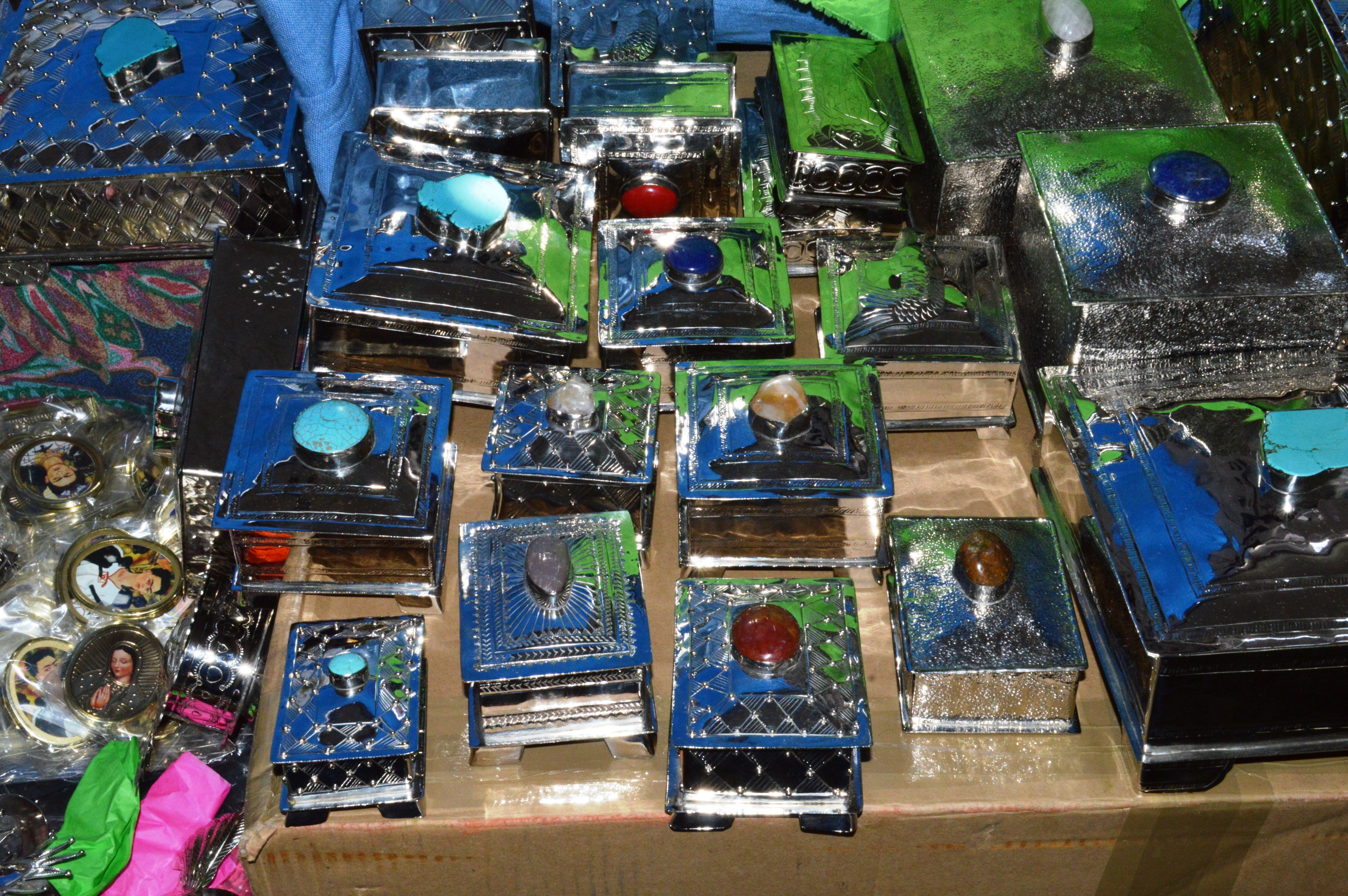
Nickel silver pieces from the Ruth Cortez Rodriguez workshop in Mexico

Nickel silver first became popular as a base metal for silver-plated cutlery and other silverware, notably the electroplated wares called EPNS (electroplated nickel silver). It is used in zippers, costume jewelry, for making musical instruments (e.g., flutes, clarinets), and is preferred for the track in electric model railway layouts, as its oxide is conductive. Better quality keys and lock cylinder pins are made of nickel silver for durability under heavy use. The alloy has been widely used in the production of coins (e.g. Portuguese escudo and the former GDR marks). Its industrial and technical uses include marine fittings and plumbing fixtures for its corrosion resistance, and heating coils for its high electrical resistance.

In the nineteenth century, particularly after 1868, North American Plains Indian metalsmiths were able to easily acquire sheets of German silver. They used them to cut, stamp, and cold hammer a wide range of accessories and also horse gear. Presently, Plains metalsmiths use German silver for pendants, pectorals, bracelets, armbands, hair plates, conchas (oval decorative plates for belts), earrings, belt buckles, necktie slides, stickpins, dush-tuhs, and tiaras. Nickel silver is the metal of choice among contemporary Kiowa and Pawnee in Oklahoma. Many of the metal fittings on modern higher-end equine harness and tack are of nickel silver.

Early in the twentieth century, Nickel silver was widely used for decorative automobile parts and fittings, many having polished nickel silver radiators.The famous Rolls-Royce Silver Ghost introduced in 1907 being one example. Nickel silver has good malleability and can easily be soft soldered which makes it very suitable for this type of component. Unfortunately whilst very corrosion resistant, nickel silver tends to oxidise and become dull with exposure to the atmosphere and needs frequent polishing to remain bright and shiny. Once lower maintenance chromium plating became widely available at the beginning of the 1930s, chrome plated brass or steel quickly began to replace nickel silver for car radiator shells and other brightwork. After about 1920, it became widely used for pocketknife bolsters, due to its machinability and corrosion resistance. Prior to this, the most common metal was iron.

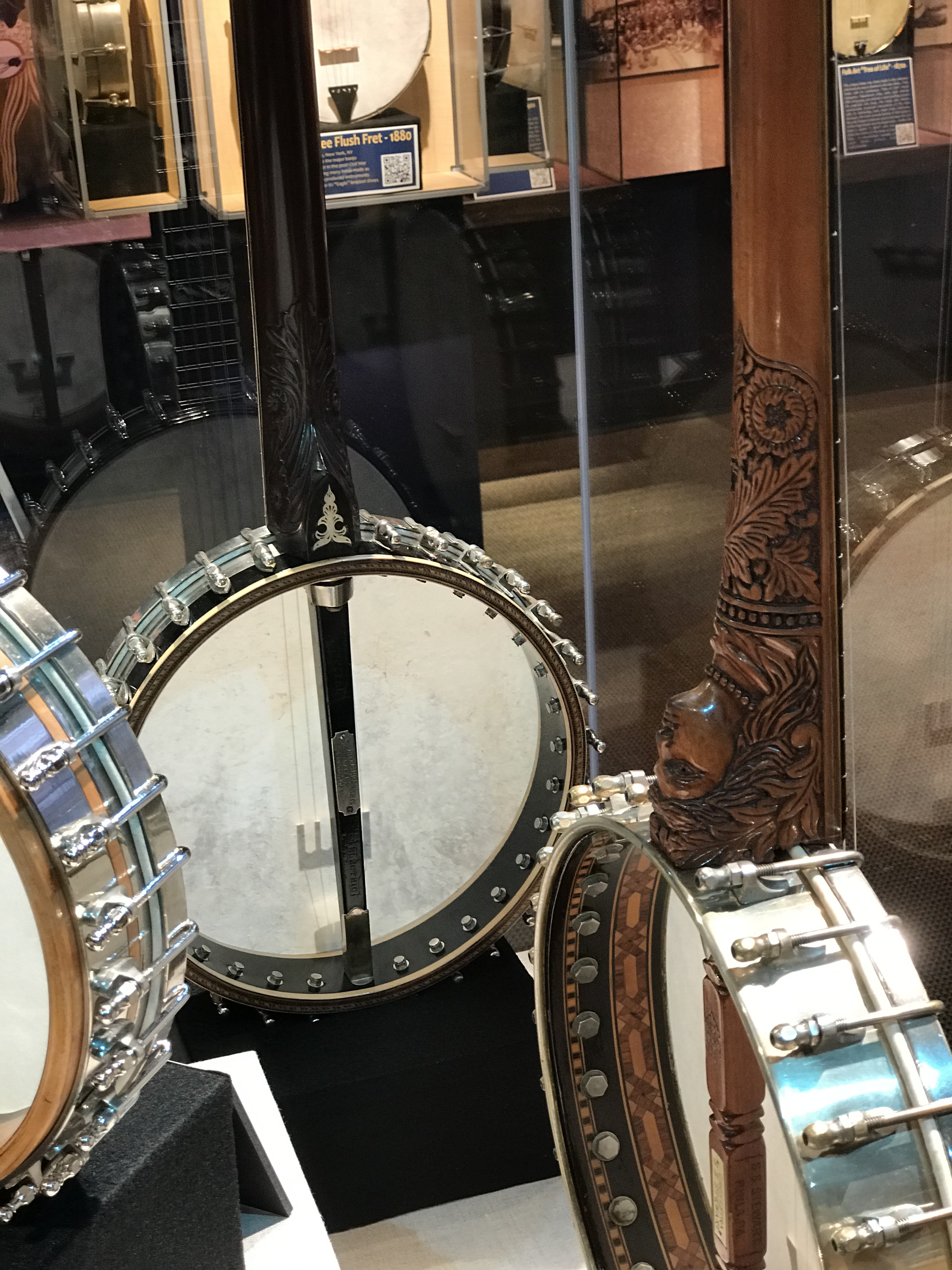
19th century banjos used German silver rims over wood for tonal quality and appearance

Musical instruments, including the flute, saxophone, trumpet, and French horn, string instrument frets, and electric guitar pickup parts, can be made of nickel silver. Many professional-level French horns are entirely made of nickel silver. Some saxophone manufacturers, such as Keilwerth, offer saxophones made of nickel silver (Shadow model); these are far rarer than traditional lacquered brass saxophones. Student-level flutes and piccolos are also made of silver-plated nickel silver, although upper-level models are likely to use sterling silver. Nickel silver produces a bright and powerful sound quality; an additional benefit is that the metal is harder and more corrosion resistant than brass. Because of its hardness, it is used for most clarinet, flute, oboe and similar wind instrument keys, normally silver-plated. It is used to produce the tubes (called staples) onto which oboe reeds are tied.

Many parts of brass instruments are made of nickel silver, such as tubes, braces or valve mechanism. Trombone slides of many manufacturers offer a lightweight nickel silver (LT slide) option for faster slide action and weight balance. The material was used in the construction of the National tricone resophonic guitar. The frets of guitar, mandolin, banjo, bass, and related string instruments are typically nickel silver. Nickel silver is sometimes used as ornamentation on the great highland bagpipe.

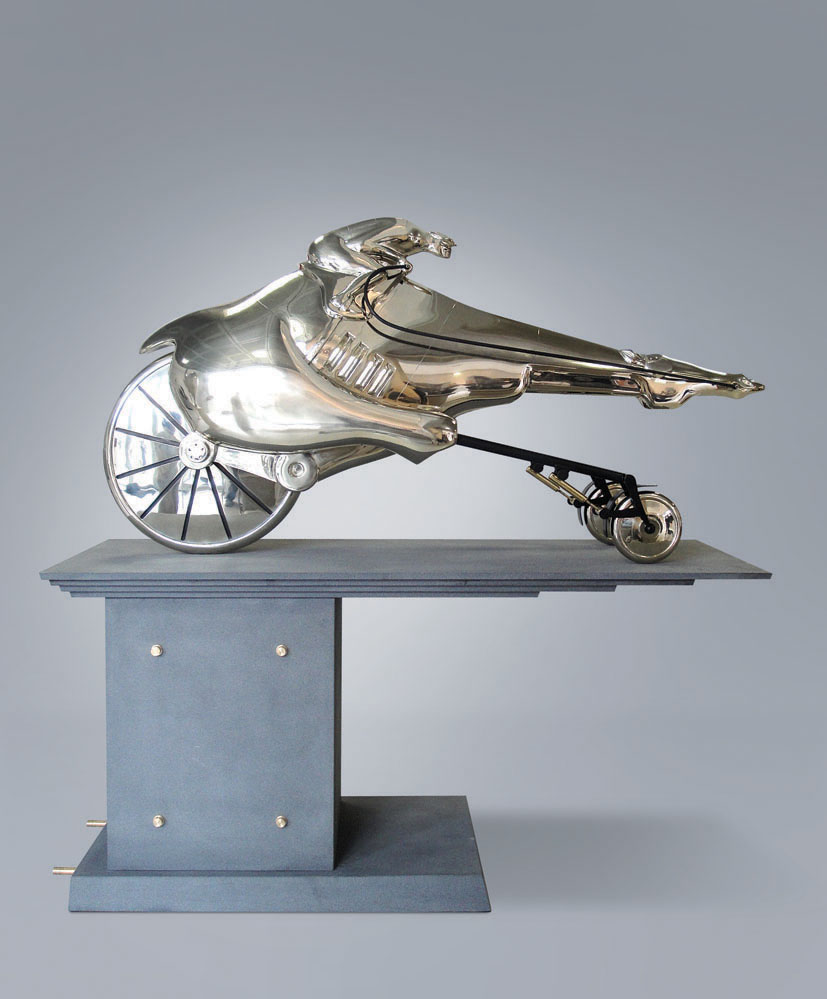
Willem Lenssinck, Formula 1 Racing Horse

Nickel silver is also used in artworks. The Dutch sculptor Willem Lenssinck has made several pieces from German silver. Outdoors art made from this material easily withstands all kinds of weather.

Nickel silver, known as alpaca silver, is the most frequent material used in the fabrication of bombillas, a utensil for drinking mate.

== See also ==
- Argentium sterling silver
- Britannia silver
- Britannia metal
- Cupronickel
- Sheffield plate
- Nickel Directive
- List of named alloys
