= Dush-toh =

Traditional woman's hair ornament of the Caddo people

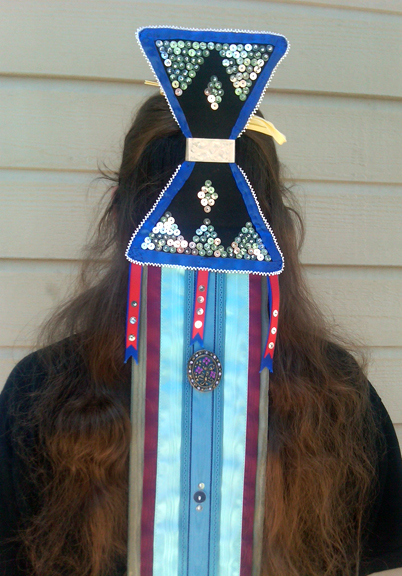
Caddo girl modeling a doosh-toh made by Tracy Burrows (Caddo-Delaware)

A dush-toh, also spelled dush-too, dush-tooh, or dush-tuh, is a customary Caddo hair ornament worn by girls and women during dances, particularly the Turkey Dance. Neighboring tribes, such as the Kickapoo and Delaware, have similar women's hair ornaments.

A dush-toh consists of an embellished, butterfly- or hourglass-shaped frame that is worn on the back of the head with ribbons that flow down the back, almost to the ground. They were made in the 19th and 20th centuries, as well as into the present.

== Frame ==
The top of the butterfly-shaped frame is typically 4.25 inches wide and the bottom is usually 4-5/8 inches wide. The frame is 7.5 inches tall. The frame can be covered in black felt and edged with colored ribbons on both sides. Further embellishments include white seed beads sewn along the edges and silver studs placed according to the individual's preference. A silver band runs around the narrowest point of the frame, which is tied to the hair. A wooden hairpin can also be used to hold the dush-toh in place. German silver spots can be attached to the frame and beaded rosettes may be used to decorate the center of the frame.

== Ribbons ==
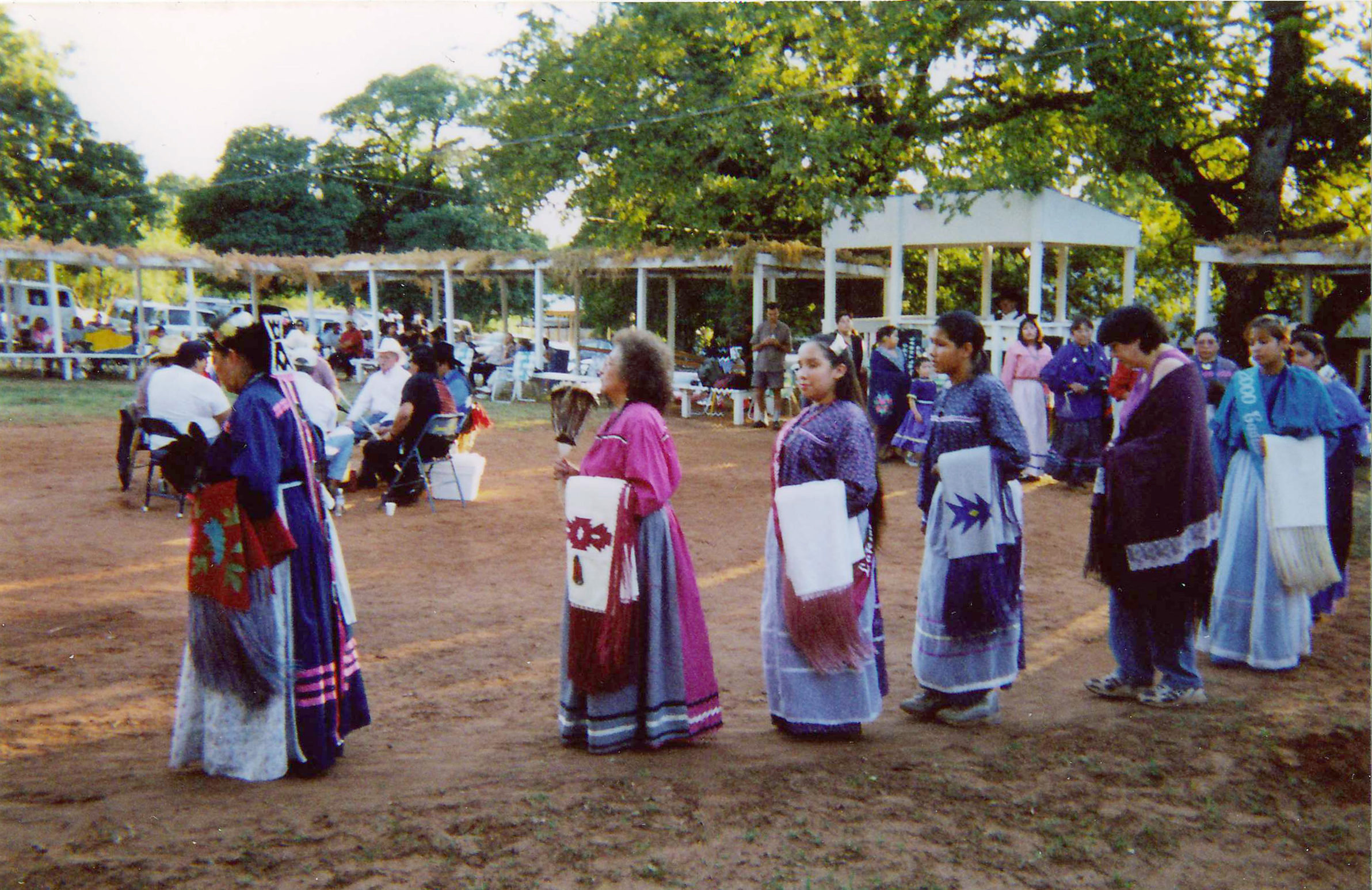
Turkey Dance, Caddo Tribal Complex, Binger, Oklahoma, 2000. The dush-toh worn by the dancer on the far left is visible.

The ribbons, usually of watered silk, are attached to the bottom of the headpiece. Four layers of ribbons are typically sewn to one ribbon band, which is sewn to the felt on the frame. Ribbons can be solid colors or plaid. They run down the back to the hemline of the dancer's dress. Bells, or cai'-coo-tze, can be sewn to the bottom for weight and a musical sound. Ribbons can be embellished with shell, mirrors, German silver medallions, or beadwork rosettes.

== Classes ==
The Caddo Nation offers classes in making dush-tohs to Caddo youth during their annual summer camp.
