= Willem Lenssinck =

Dutch-German sculptor and designer (born 1947)

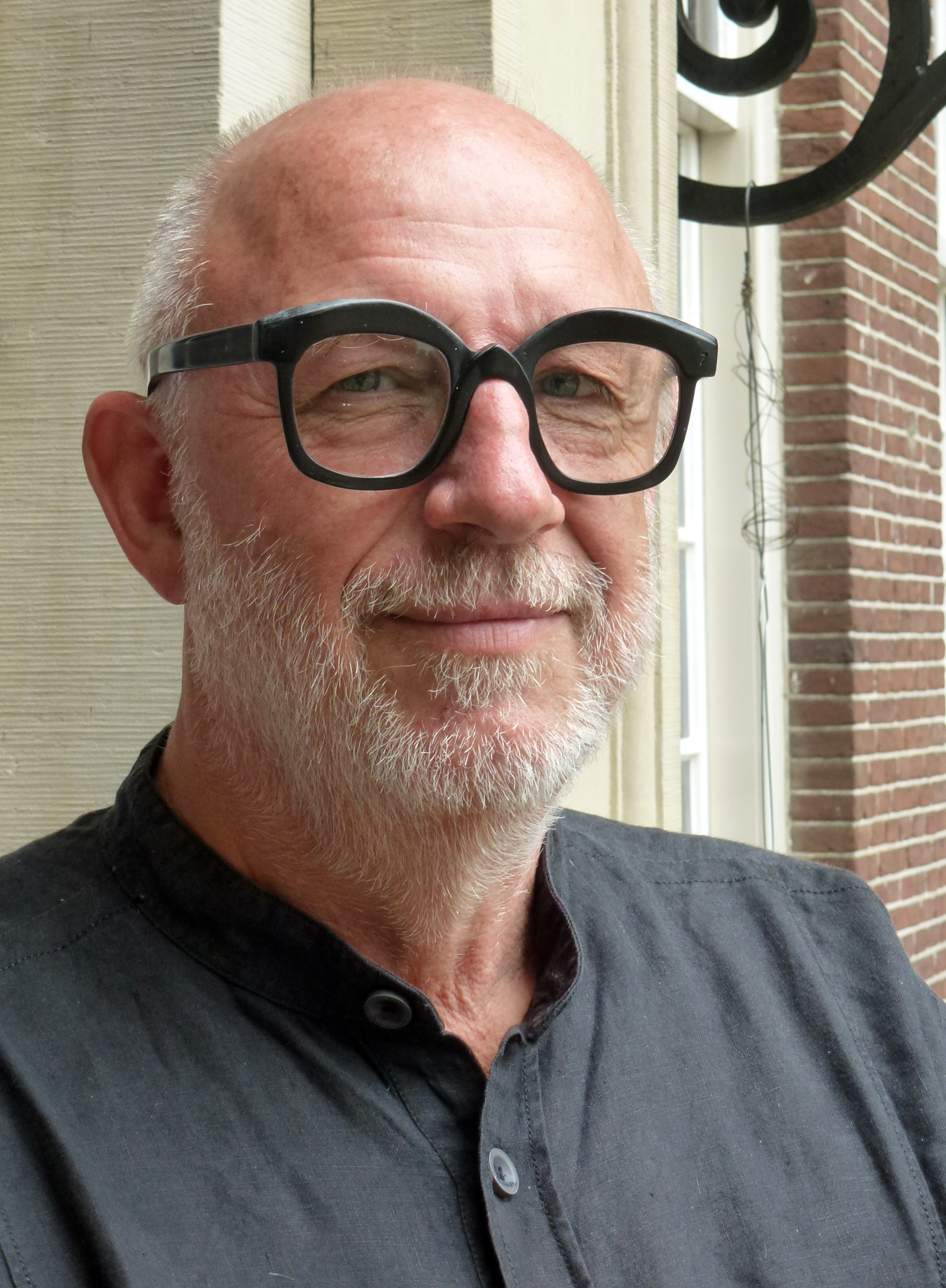
- Willem Lenssinck in 2016
- Born: Wilhelmus Joannes Lenssinck; 21 April 1947; Woerden, Netherlands
- Known for: sculpting, designing

Willem Lenssinck (*Woerden, The Netherlands, April 21, 1947) is a Dutch-German sculptor and designer.

== Life and work ==
Willem Lenssinck, son of a Dutch father and a German mother, grew up in Harmelen in The Netherlands. In the 1950s, the family moved to Utrecht, where Lenssinck later attended the Academy of Fine Arts (HKU). In the year of his graduation, 1969, he was recommended by his teachers to Royal Delft and immediately hired as a designer for industrial ceramics.

Since 1972 Lenssinck is self-employed and worked on numerous assignments in ceramic or bronze. Since 1985 the artist lives in Langbroek. In 2001 he married Catherine Laimböck-Vermeulen, the daughter of the painter Piet Vermeulen. Lenssinck is father of Jeroen Lenssinck and stepfather of Lia Laimböck, both also active as artists.

Today Lenssinck focusses solely on free work; sculptures in bronze, German silver, stainless steel or aluminium as well as the design of furniture and lighting objects. His sculptures are characterised by a futuristic look, sharp lines and smooth, highly polished surfaces. Favourite subjects of his work are 'horse and machine' - as a symbol of technological development of the 20th century - female figures, guard figures and bulls. Since 2005 Lenssinck uses new 3D design processes to overcome technical limitations of traditional plaster models, such as enlargements or miniaturisation. Willem Lenssinck's works can be found, among others, in the collections of the British Museum (London), Museum Beelden aan Zee (Scheveningen), Museum Buitenplaats (Eelde), the collection IHK Hannover, the private collection of Silvio Berlusconi and other private collections throughout the world.

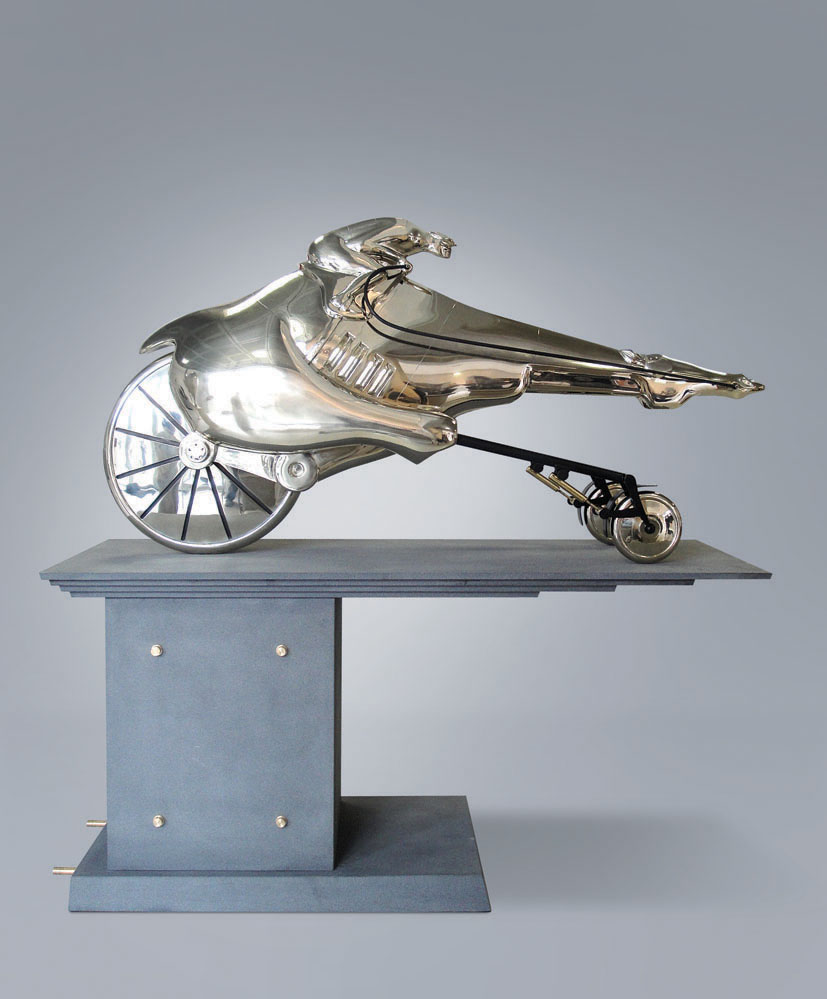
Willem Lenssinck - Formula I Racing Horse (2014), neusilber

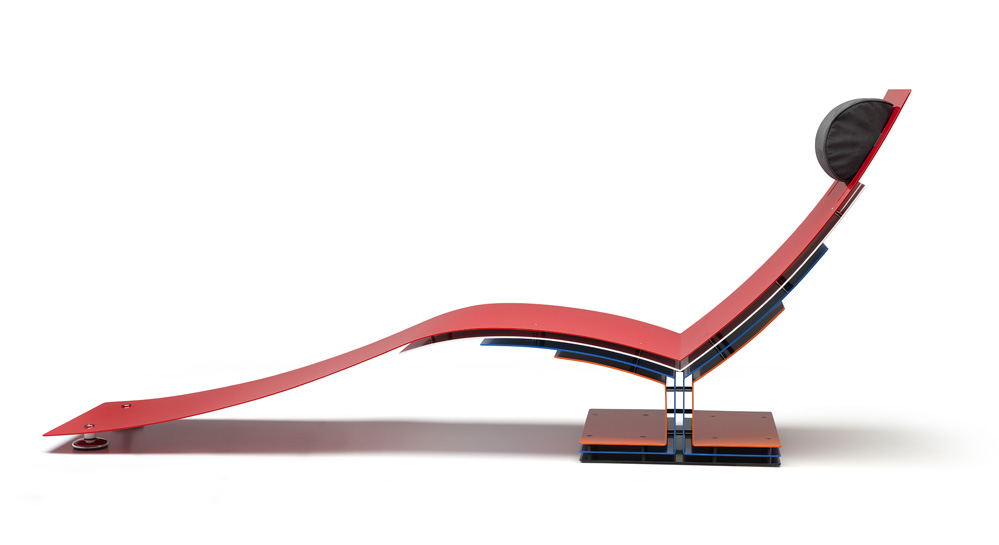
Royal Dutch Chair (2012), LSD design

In 1991 Lenssinck received the Pieter d'Hont Award for his artistic work. His sculptures were regularly present at art fairs like PAN Fine Art Fair, Amsterdam, and TEFAF (The European Fine Art Fair) in Maastricht. In 2007, the monograph "Willem Lenssinck" was published on the occasion of his sixtieth birthday. The Louwman Museum at The Hague showed Lenssinck's work during the exhibition "Horse Power" in 2015.

== Exhibitions (selection) ==
- 1990 - 1993 Pan Fine Art Fair, Amsterdam
- 1992 - 2016 Galerie Laimböck, Langbroek
- 1993 - 2015 TEFAF, Maastricht
- 1993 Kunsthaus Bühler, Stuttgart
- 1994 Museum Beelden aan Zee, Scheveningen
- 1994 Art Fair Herrenhausen, Hannover
- 1995 Lineart, Gent
- 1996 Tresor Fine Art Fair, Singapore
- 2000 Museum De Buitenplaats, Eelde
- 2007 Steendruk Museum, Valkenswaard
- 2010 - 2012 Art Fair Zurich, Zurich
- 2013 Art Fair, West Palm Beach
- 2015 Louwman Museum, The Hague

== Literature ==
- Willem Lenssinck Sculpture - Design. Langbroek, 2007. ISBN 90-902-1461-5
