= Turkey dance =

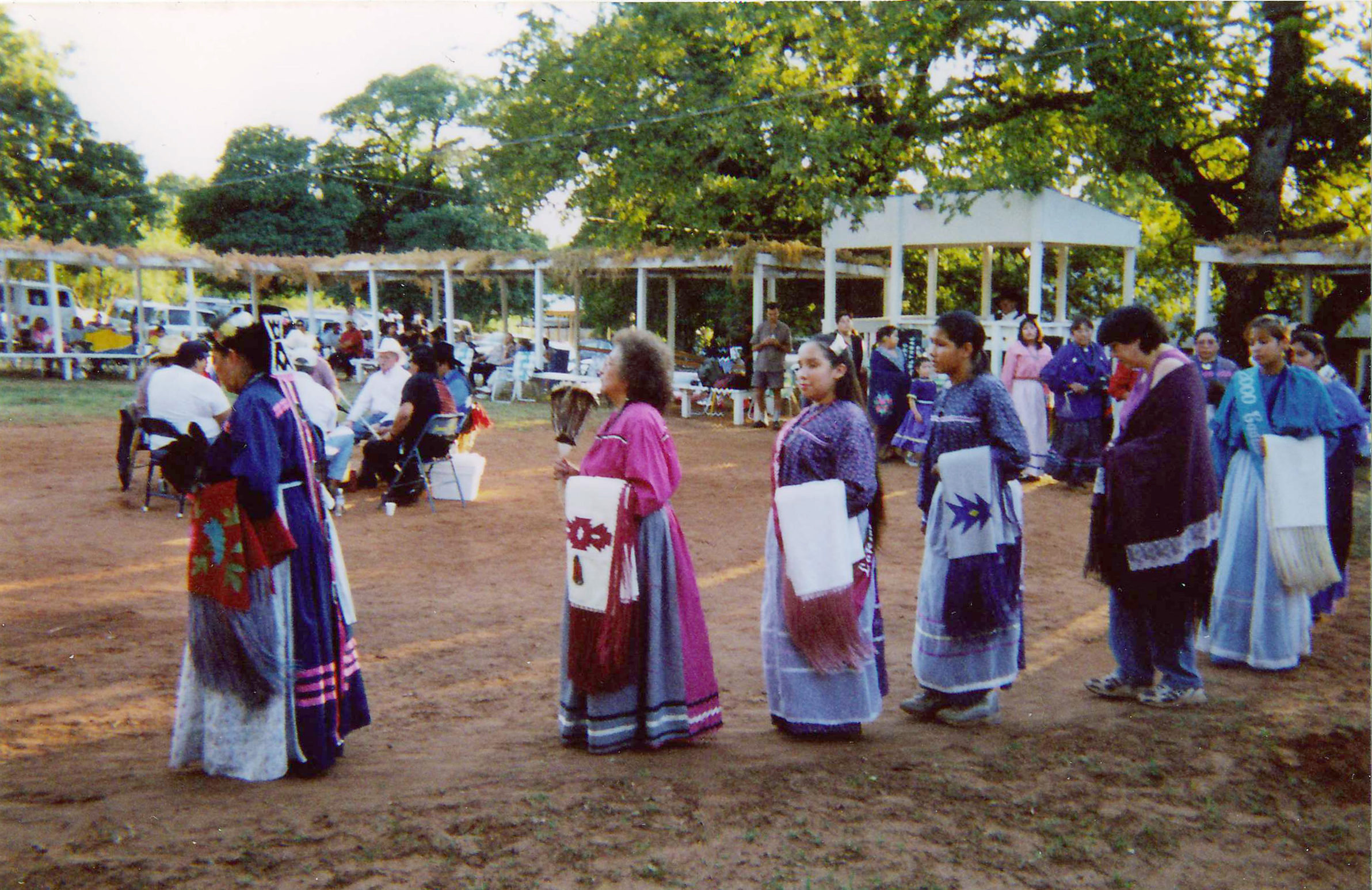
Turkey Dance, Caddo Tribal Complex, Binger, Oklahoma, 2000

The turkey dance (Caddo: Núh Kaʔáwshan) is one of the most important traditional dances among Caddo people. Women dance the turkey dance, while men drum and sing the songs, which describe events in Caddo history.

The dance takes place in the afternoon and is finished by sunset, when turkeys return to their roosts. Caddos traditionally founded their villages and camps near turkey roosts, because the turkeys served as sentinels — creating noises when people approached.

== History ==
The turkey dances are ancient, and several stories of their origin exist. One explanation is that a Caddo man, hunting in the forest, heard singing. The source was a rafter of turkey hens dancing in a circle around a tom turkey. The hunter carefully observed and memorized the dance to share it with his tribe.

18th-century Spanish missionaries wrote descriptions of Hasinai women dancing the turkey dance when warriors returned to their village. In the 21st century, Caddo women still dance with a ceremonial cane presented to the tribe by the Spanish before 1809.

The Caddo have continuously maintained the turkey dance, but it particularly enjoyed a revival after World War II.

== Dance ==
In a day of Caddo dances, the turkey dance is the first one performed. The dance has several phases. In the past, women danced around a pole. During the third phase the women cluster around the men drumming in the center of the dance area. During the final phase, the women dancers get to choose male dance partners. The dance is concluded with a flag song and the lowering of the US flag in honor of Caddo veterans. The dance movements of the women may have been inspired by turkey movements.

Today turkey dances are usually held at the Caddo National Tribal Complex dance grounds in Binger, Oklahoma. The Hasinay Society and Caddo Cultural Club both perform turkey dances.

== Regalia ==
Caddo women's dance regalia include handmade dresses, broadcloth blankets, beadwork, and dush-tohs, which are plaques adorned with brass or mirrors and flowing ribbons. Dresses are ankle-length with ribbons sewn around the skirt. Blouses match the skirts in color and have flared yokes. Over their skirts, women wear full-length aprons.

== Songs ==
52 Caddo turkey dance songs are still sung today. They recount Caddo historical events in the many dialects that comprise the Caddo language. Many recount military exploits, but they begin with oral history of the creation of the Caddo people. One song tells about the overnight creation of Caddo Lake. As Cecile Elkins Carter writes, "The dances celebrate Caddo survival."
