= Jean Baptiste Brevelle II =

French creole explorer and soldier of the Louisiana colony

- Born: 1730; Native American village on the frontier of French Louisiana
- Died: 1806; Isle Brevelle, Natchitoches Parish, Louisiana
- Other names: Jean Baptiste Brevel II, Jean Baptiste Brevel, Jr.
- Occupations: Explorer; Trader; Translator; Soldier
- Years active: 1745-1804
- Known for: Exploring the Continental divide of the Americas and establishing Isle Brevelle, the birthplace of Louisiana Creole culture
- Spouse: Marie Francoise Poissot (m. 1760; died 1800)
- Children: 4 sons and 9 daughters
- Parents: Jean Baptiste Brevelle (father); Anne des Cadeaux (mother)
- Family: Brevelle Family

Jean Baptiste Brevelle II (French: Jean Baptiste Brevel II) was a French and Native American explorer, translator and soldier of the militia at Fort St. Jean Baptiste des Natchitoches in present-day Natchitoches, Louisiana and Le Poste des Cadodaquious in Texas.

== Early life ==
Brevelle was born in 1730 at a Caddo village on the frontier lands of French Louisiana near Fort St. Jean Baptiste des Natchitoches. His father, Jean Baptiste Brevelle, was a Parisian-born trader and soldier stationed at the fort. His mother, Anne des Cadeaux, was a Native American slave. Brevelle spent the first several years living in Native American villages following his father's military and trade assignments with various Caddo tribes in Louisiana, Arkansas and Texas.

In 1736, the family returned to Natchitoches where he was baptized in the Catholic Church in what would later become the Roman Catholic Diocese of Natchitoches. His father obtained permission from Fort Commandant Louis Juchereau de St. Denis to marry his mother and free her from slavery. After the publication of three banns, his parents were married in Natchitoches.

== Explorer of French Louisiana and New Spain ==
Fort St. Jean Baptiste des Natchitoches was a fortified post on Red River of the South to establish France's claims to the region and to prevent the Spanish forces in the province of Texas from advancing across the border. Being half Indian and with his knowledge of Caddo customs and languages, Brevelle enlisted in the militia serving as a soldier and translator for the French colonial government. His assignments took him on the El Camino Real (English: The King’s Highway) in Louisiana and Texas. Brevelle mapped areas along the Red, Sabine, and Trinity Rivers as he lived among and traded with the Natchitoches, Adai, Hasinai, Nasoni, Yatasi, Tawakoni and Kadohadacho Indians.

In 1762, France ceded the colony to Spain as part of the Treaty of Fontainebleau. The treaty followed the last battle in the French and Indian War. Brevelle then served the colonial government of New Spain as a translator and soldier.

In 1767, Brevelle led a band of his Caddo kinsmen across Louisiana, Texas and New Mexico. He left the supply base at Le Poste des Cadodaquious and traveled to Sante Fe and was one of the first explorers of the Continental Divide of the Americas. His knowledge of Native American languages and customs helped to negotiate and establish trade agreements with the various Native American tribes. Upon returning to Natchitoches, his travels had brought him wealth and a sizable land grant, which today bears his name: Isle Brevelle. The 30-mile long isle is 2-4 miles in width and located south of Natchitoches along the Red River and Cane River.

== Personal life ==
in 1760, Brevelle married Marie Francoise Poissot, the daughter of a wealthy French officer; a remarkable feat for a half-breed and son of a slave. Together, they had 13 children (4 sons and 9 daughters). He built a plantation on Isle Brevelle where he grew tobacco and raised livestock. The plantation was also an exporter of lumber, leather and bear grease to the growing port of New Orleans.

== Legacy ==
Brevelle died in 1806 on his plantation at Isle Brevelle near Bayou Brevelle but he and his family left a lasting legacy in Louisiana.

Brevelle was one of the first Creoles. John Sibley, Indian Agent and council to Louisiana's first U.S. governor, in 1804 reported to the U.S. Congress that Isle Brevelle was named for its earliest settler, Jean Baptiste Brevelle II. Bayou Brevelle and Brevelle Rail Station are also named after him.

Fort St. Jean Baptiste des Natchitoches became the town of Natchitoches, the oldest permanent settlement in the Louisiana Purchase territory.

The former Brevelle Plantation (now Isle Brevelle) is home to the Cane River Creole National Historical Park and is the birthplace of Creole culture. In Louisiana, the term Creole is defined as native-born people of ethnic European background mixed with Native American and/or African. Brevelle's story and that of his sister are documented in the records of the Catholic Church and in their interviews with Indian Agent Dr. Sibley after the Louisiana Purchase which are on file in the American State Papers, Library of Congress, and the Annals of Congress.

St. Augustine Parish (Isle Brevelle) Church, Bayou Brevelle, and Isle Brevelle in Natchitoches Parish and Brevelle Lake in Red River County are named for this pioneer family.

"The Caddo left their names, art, and culture in Louisiana. Several colonial European families can claim Caddoan ancestors: Grappes, Brevelles, Balthazars, and others."

== See also ==
- Cane River (film)
- National Register of Historic Places listings in Natchitoches Parish, Louisiana
