= Detroit High School (Texas) =

Coordinates: 33.6691°N 95.2688°W

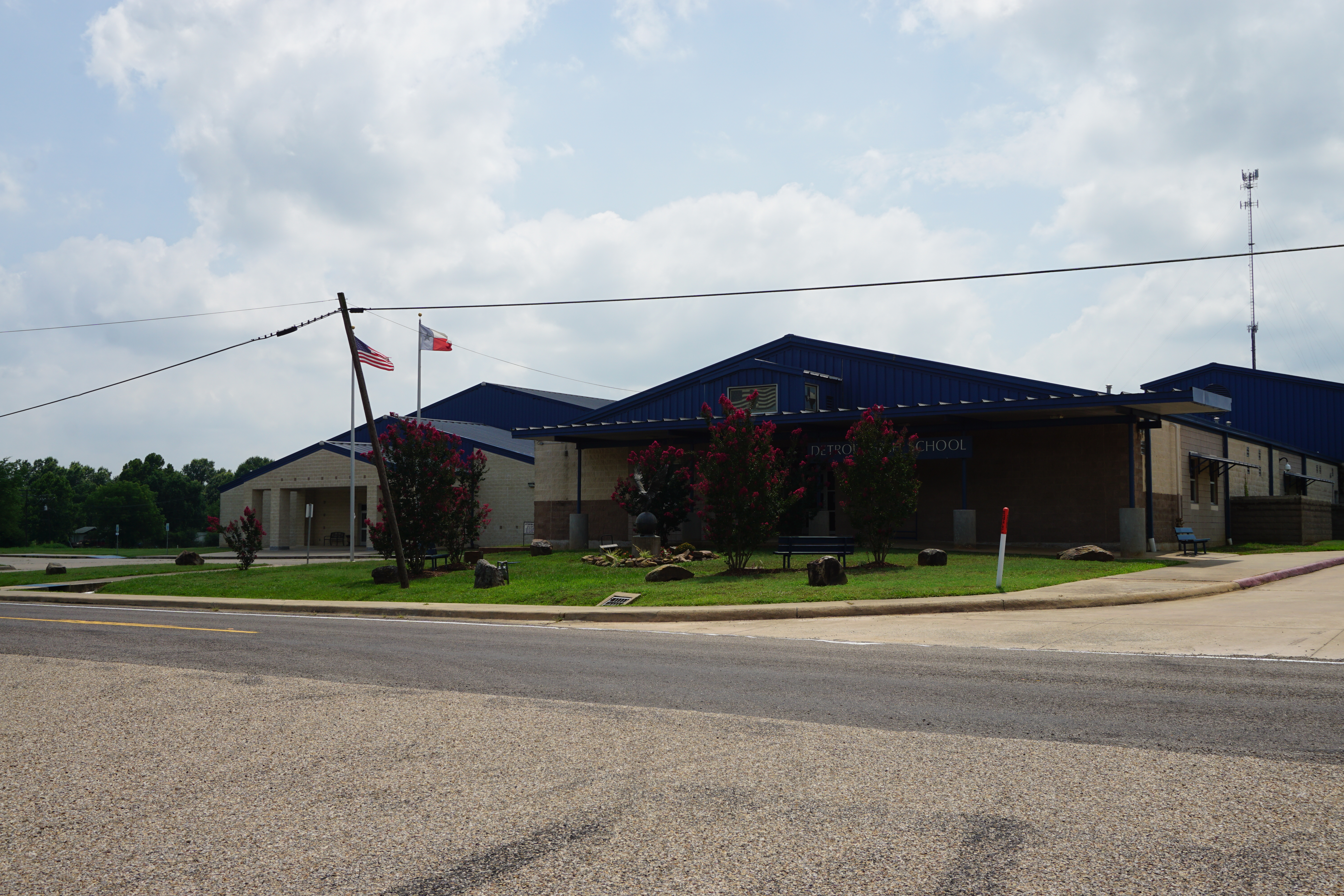
- Detroit High School

Location
- FM 410 North; Detroit, Texas 75436-9506; United States

Information
- School type: Public high school
- School district: Detroit Independent School District
- Principal: Jonathan Lloyd
- Teaching staff: 16.42 (FTE)
- Grades: 9-12
- Enrollment: 148 (2023–2024)
- Student to teacher ratio: 9.01
- Colors: Blue, black, and white
- Athletics conference: UIL Class 2A
- Mascot: Eagle
- Yearbook: The Eagle
- Website: Detroit High School

Detroit High School is a public high school located in Detroit, Texas (USA) and classified as a 2A school by the UIL. It is part of the Detroit Independent School District located in west central Red River County. In 2015, the school was rated "Met Standard" by the Texas Education Agency.

== Athletics ==
The Detroit Eagles compete in these sports -

Cross Country, Volleyball, Football, Basketball, Golf, Track, Softball & Baseball

=== State Titles ===
- Girls Track -
  - 1991(1A)
