= Shawnee Creek (Texas) =

Stream in Red River County, Texas

Shawee Creek
- Shawnee Creek Shawnee Creek (Texas) (the United States)

Location
- Country: United States
- State: Texas
- County: Red River

Physical characteristics
- Source: Brevelle Lake, Big Slough
- Mouth
  - coordinates: 33°24′35″N 94°52′32″W
- Length: 16 m (52 ft)

Shawnee Creek is a series of interconnected, natural waterways totaling over 16 miles in length in Red River County, Texas. This winding, stream flows south, then southeast to its mouth on the Sulphur River, five miles west of the Bowie county line.

The nearby town of Shawnee, Texas took its name from Shawnee Creek.

== History ==
The entire area historically was part of the Caddo Confederacy. French explorer Jean Baptiste Bénard de La Harpe founded the military fort Le Poste des Cadodaquious in 1719. The post was garrisoned with French soldiers including Jean Baptiste Brevelle from Fort St. Jean Baptiste des Natchitoches and their Native American wives, including Anne des Cadeaux. The fort remained in continuous use until 1770. In the 1820s, the Shawnee temporarily settled in the area. Shawnee Creek is named for a band of Shawnee that lived along the banks of the creek.

== See also ==
- Brevelle Lake
