= Annona, Texas =

- Town
- Interactive map of Annona, Texas
- Coordinates: 33°34′55″N 94°54′47″W
- Country: United States
- State: Texas
- County: Red River

Area
  - Total: 0.80 sq mi (2.07 km^{2})
  - Land: 0.80 sq mi (2.07 km^{2})
  - Water: 0 sq mi (0.00 km^{2})
- Elevation: 374 ft (114 m)

Population (2020)
  - Total: 184
  - Density: 230/sq mi (88.9/km^{2})
- Time zone: UTC-6 (Central (CST))
  - Summer (DST): UTC-5 (CDT)
- ZIP code: 75550
- Area codes: 903, 430
- FIPS code: 48-03360
- GNIS feature ID: 2412367
- Website: cityofannona.com

Annona is a town in Red River County, Texas, United States. The population was 184 at the 2020 census.

== Geography ==
According to the United States Census Bureau, the town has a total area of 0.8 square miles (2.1 km^{2}), all land.

The climate in this area is characterized by hot, humid summers and generally mild to cool winters. According to the Köppen Climate Classification system, Annona has a humid subtropical climate, abbreviated "Cfa" on climate maps.

== Demographics ==
Historical population
Census	Pop.	Note	%±
1890	267		—
1930	426		—
1940	446		4.7%
1950	392		−12.1%
1960	369		−5.9%
1970	373		1.1%
1980	471		26.3%
1990	329		−30.1%
2000	282		−14.3%
2010	315		11.7%
2020	184		−41.6%
U.S. Decennial Census; 2020 Census

As of the census of 2000, there were 282 people, 116 households, and 72 families residing in the town. The population density was 349.8 inhabitants per square mile (135.1/km^{2}). There were 142 housing units at an average density of 176.2 per square mile (68.0/km^{2}). The racial makeup of the town was 43.62% White, 37.59% African American, 2.48% Native American, 12.41% from other races, and 3.90% from two or more races. Hispanic or Latino of any race were 16.67% of the population.

There were 116 households, out of which 23.3% had children under the age of 18 living with them, 41.4% were married couples living together, 17.2% had a female householder with no husband present, and 37.1% were non-families. 33.6% of all households were made up of individuals, and 22.4% had someone living alone who was 65 years of age or older. The average household size was 2.43 and the average family size was 3.14.

In the town, the population was spread out, with 23.8% under the age of 18, 10.6% from 18 to 24, 20.9% from 25 to 44, 23.8% from 45 to 64, and 20.9% who were 65 years of age or older. The median age was 39 years. For every 100 females, there were 83.1 males. For every 100 females age 18 and over, there were 80.7 males.

The median income for a household in the town was $26,731, and the median income for a family was $26,625. Males had a median income of $22,955 versus $20,417 for females. The per capita income for the town was $11,984. About 11.4% of families and 12.3% of the population were below the poverty line, including 14.1% of those under the age of eighteen and 20.5% of those 65 or over.

== See also ==
- Brevelle Lake
- Sulphur River
