= Avery Secondary School =

Avery High School

Location
- 150 San Antonio St; Avery, Texas 75554; United States; 33°33′9″N 94°47′12″W

Information
- School type: Public high school
- School district: Avery Independent School District
- Principal: Brent Jackson
- Staff: 19.52 (FTE)
- Grades: 6-12
- Enrollment: 171 (2023–2024)
- Student to teacher ratio: 8.76
- Colors: Maroon & White
- Athletics conference: UIL Class A
- Mascot: Bulldogs/Lady Bulldogs
- Website: School Website

Avery High School is a high school located in Avery, Texas (USA). It is part of the Avery Independent School District located in east central Red River County. In 2022, the school received an "A" rating from the Texas Education Agency

== Athletics ==
The Avery Bulldogs compete in the following sports:

- Baseball
- Basketball
- Cross Country
- Golf
- Softball
- Track and Field
- Volleyball
