= Maple, Texas =

Maple, Texas may refer to:

- Maple, Bailey County, Texas
- Maple, Red River County, Texas
