= Avery, Texas =

- Town
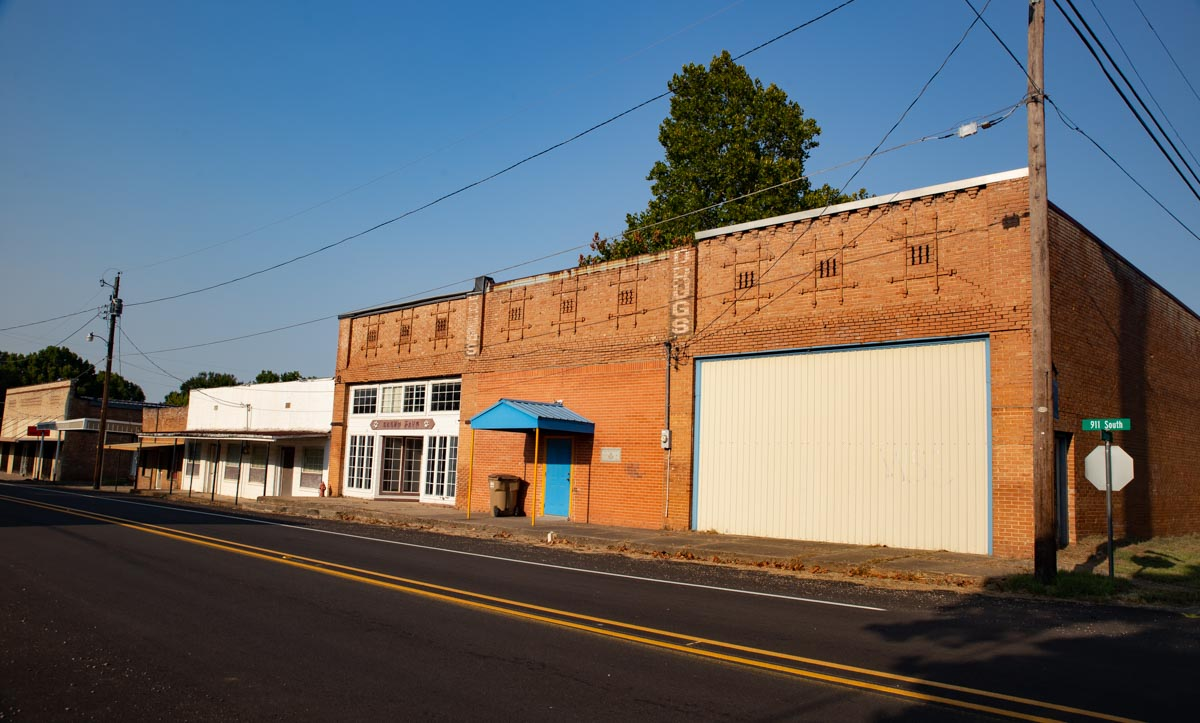
- Downtown Avery
- Interactive map of Avery, Texas
- Coordinates: 33°33′08″N 94°46′49″W
- Country: United States
- State: Texas
- County: Red River

Area
  - Total: 0.97 sq mi (2.52 km^{2})
  - Land: 0.95 sq mi (2.46 km^{2})
  - Water: 0.023 sq mi (0.06 km^{2})
- Elevation: 466 ft (142 m)

Population (2020)
  - Total: 421
  - Density: 443/sq mi (171/km^{2})
- Time zone: UTC-6 (Central (CST))
  - Summer (DST): UTC-5 (CDT)
- ZIP code: 75554
- Area codes: 903, 430
- FIPS code: 48-05072
- GNIS feature ID: 2411656
- Website: https://averytx.com/

Avery is a town in Red River County, in the U.S. state of Texas. The population was 421 at the 2020 census. From the 1920s through the early 1960s Avery was one of the largest tomato producing and shipping cities in northeastern Texas.

== History ==
The town was established in the 1870s. Avery is located on U.S. Highway 82, sixteen miles southeast of Clarksville in eastern Red River County. When the Texas and Pacific railroad was being constructed through the county in the 1870s, the managers of the railroad planned a station at the site and named it Douglass. Settlement in the community was slow because the surrounding area was so sparsely populated. When a correspondent of the Clarksville Standard newspaper visited Douglass in early 1881, he found a collection of families living in tents. Later that year, when Isaac Bradford and his partner opened their general store, a post office was established there, and the name of the town was changed to Isaca. In 1902 the name was changed to Avery, in honor of Ed Avery, the first railway station agent. In 1884, the population was estimated at thirty, and by 1896 it had increased to forty-eight. By 1900 Avery had three churches, a school, and a population of 176. During the first decade of the twentieth century, cotton ginning was an important local industry. By 1914, the town had two banks; a weekly newspaper, the Avery News, published by H. H. Morgan; and a population estimated at 500. The population reached its highest point in the late 1920s with a reported 800 residents, before declining sharply to a low of 300 in the early 1930s. Avery was incorporated before the 1940 census, when it reported 477 residents. The population subsequently remained relatively stable. The 1980 census recorded 520 residents, and in 1986 nine businesses were reported. In 1990 the population was 430. By 2000, the population increased to 462.

== Geography ==
According to the United States Census Bureau, the town has a total area of 1.0 square mile (2.6 km^{2}), of which 0.9 square miles (2.3 km^{2}) is land and 0.04 square miles (0.10 km^{2}) (3.06%) is water.

== Demographics ==
Historical population
Census	Pop.	Note	%±
1940	477		—
1950	442		−7.3%
1960	343		−22.4%
1970	491		43.1%
1980	520		5.9%
1990	430		−17.3%
2000	462		7.4%
2010	482		4.3%
2020	421		−12.7%
U.S. Decennial Census

As of the census of 2000, there were 462 people, 210 households, and 136 families residing in the town. The population density was 487.9 inhabitants per square mile (188.4/km^{2}). There were 241 housing units at an average density of 254.5 per square mile (98.3/km^{2}). The racial makeup of the town was 96.54% White, 1.30% African American, 0.22% Native American, and 1.95% from two or more races. Hispanic or Latino of any race were 0.43% of the population.

There were 210 households, out of which 26.7% had children under the age of 18 living with them, 43.8% were married couples living together, 13.8% had a female householder with no husband present, and 34.8% were non-families. 34.8% of all households were made up of individuals, and 21.4% had someone living alone who was 65 years of age or older. The average household size was 2.20 and the average family size was 2.75.

In the town, the population was spread out, with 22.7% under the age of 18, 8.9% from 18 to 24, 22.7% from 25 to 44, 25.1% from 45 to 64, and 20.6% who were 65 years of age or older. The median age was 43 years. For every 100 females, there were 88.6 males. For every 100 females age 18 and over, there were 76.7 males.

The median income for a household in the town was $21,146, and the median income for a family was $27,917. Males had a median income of $23,333 versus $16,346 for females. The per capita income for the town was $13,180. About 14.3% of families and 21.5% of the population were below the poverty line, including 22.3% of those under age 18 and 30.5% of those age 65 or over.

== Education ==
The town of Avery is served by the Avery Independent School District and is home to the Avery High School Bulldogs.

== See also ==
- Brevelle Lake
- Sulphur River
