= Senator Aiken (disambiguation) =

George Aiken was a United States Senator from Vermont from 1941 to 1975. Senator Aiken may also refer to:

- William Aiken Jr. (1806–1887), South Carolina State Senate
- A. M. Aikin Jr. (1905–1981), Texas State Senate
- George M. Aitken (fl. 1935), Oregon State Senate
