= Cuthand, Texas =

Unincorporated community in Texas, US

Coordinates: 33°28′03″N 95°03′20″W

Cuthand is an unincorporated community in Red River County, Texas, United States.

== History ==
A post office called Cuthand was established in 1867, and remained in operation until 1953. According to tradition, the name derives from a pioneer incident in which an Indian injured his hand.
