= Beaumont race riot of 1943 =

1943 period of racial violence in Beaumont, Texas, United States

- Part of civil unrest during World War II
- Date: June 15–17, 1943
- Location: Beaumont, Texas
- Caused by: Alleged rape of white woman by a black man
- Methods: rioting, arson, pogrom

Parties
White rioters	Texas State Guard; Texas Highway Patrol; Texas Rangers Black civilians

Number
4,000	1,975

Casualties
- Deaths: 3
- Injuries: 50+
- Arrested: 200+

The 1943 race riot in Beaumont, Texas was an anti-Black terrorist event that erupted on June 15, 1943 and ended two days later. It was related to wartime tensions in the overcrowded city, which had been flooded by workers from across the South. White workers from the Pennsylvania Shipyard in Beaumont attacked local black residents and destroyed their property following a rumor that a white woman had been raped by a black man. Two black men and one white man were killed in the widespread violence and more than 50 were injured. More than 200 were arrested and black residents were temporarily banned from going to work.

The Beaumont event was one of several riots in the summer of 1943 in which black people suffered as victims and had the greatest losses in property damage. They were related to social competition and tensions arising from the wartime build-up. Some cities were struggling to accommodate the influx of black and white defense workers, dealing with shortages in housing and strained services.

Beaumont had become a destination for tens of thousands of workers in the defense industry; from 1940 to 1943 the city had grown from 59,000 to 80,000 persons, with African Americans maintaining a proportion of roughly one third of the total. Workers were attracted to the buildup of high-paying jobs in the defense industry, concentrated at the shipyard, as Beaumont was located on the Neches River northeast of Houston on the Gulf Coast. Executive Order 8802 was issued by the president to prohibit discrimination among defense contractors, and African Americans sought a share of opportunities in the high-paying jobs in Texas. New residents in Beaumont competed for jobs and housing in the crowded town, where whites had imposed segregated facilities, as was common across the South.

== Background ==
In 1942, socioeconomic conditions worsened as wartime shortages affected more people. This aggravated interracial tensions in Beaumont. Economic restrictions limited the availability of consumer goods, but defense workers were making good money and were ready for some goods after the privations of the Great Depression. President Franklin D. Roosevelt announced a policy to end discrimination in employment in the defense industries through his Executive Order 8802 of 1941; he wanted to encourage all American citizens to support the war effort. From 1940 to 1943, Beaumont had grown more than 36% from 59,000 to 80,000 persons; both African Americans and whites flocked to the city for the industrial jobs. As the population grew, African Americans maintained their proportion of roughly one third of the total population.

Although public facilities were racially segregated under state law and African Americans had been disenfranchised by Southern states since the turn of the century, they sought the high-paying defense jobs at the shipyards, as had thousands of white workers. The yards employed thousands of workers; Pennsylvania Shipyard was one of the largest, with 8500 workers.

Racial animosity and friction during the Jim Crow era were not unusual, but wartime conditions made matters worse. More serious than the economic restrictions were service problems in the city caused by the huge increase in population. The city transportation could not keep up, and crowds added to the tensions between passengers on the segregated system. On June 30, 1942, there were confrontations on four separate buses: blacks were forced to stand or take inferior seats under Jim Crow practices. In one altercation on July 27, Charles J. Reco, a black military policeman, was shot four times and clubbed by Beaumont police as they removed him from a bus following a minor complaint of his knees sticking into the 'white section.' His military unit protested to the United States Department of War over the treatment by local police.

Four unrelated events amplified the mounting racial tensions in Beaumont. In the months before the riot, numerous atrocities were exacted upon African Americans in Houston, Texas, and the surrounding counties.

== Rioting ==
In the immediate event, starting June 15, 1943, a white woman in Beaumont said she had been raped by a black man. Learning of the charge, white workers confronted blacks at the Pennsylvania Shipyard and violence erupted. About 2,000 white workers, joined by 1,000 more whites, advanced on the jail where suspects were held. By the time they reached the jail, the mob numbered 4,000. The woman was unable to identify any prisoner as her alleged assailant. Breaking into small groups, white mobs attacked and terrorized black neighborhoods near the jail in the central and north parts of the city, and destroyed 100 homes.

The mayor requested assistance from the Texas Defense Guard (Later known as Texas State Guard). Adjutant General A. B. Knickerbocker of Texas sent one battalion of Texas Defense Guard from Beaumont and two battalions from Port Arthur, and acting governor A. M. Aikin Jr., speaker pro tem of the State House, established a curfew and martial law. A total of about 1,800 guardsmen, 100 state highway police, and 75 Texas Rangers were ordered in to the city. The state highway police closed it off to prevent whites from outside entering the city to join the violence. The armed forces declared the city off limits for all military personnel. Black workers were banned from going to work, although the curfew was lifted by the end of June 16. Mayor Gary closed liquor stores, parks, and playgrounds to prevent any gathering of large crowds. After the mayor ended the curfew on June 16, the guardsmen left town.

Martial law was maintained by state units until June 20, during which more violence took place. By the end of the violence, one black man and one white man were dead, 50 persons were injured, and more than 200 were arrested. Another black man died from his injuries months later.

== Aftermath ==
By June 20, a military tribunal had reviewed the cases of the 206 arrested. Twenty-nine cases were turned over to police authorities on charges of assault and battery, unlawful assembly, and arson. The remainder of suspects were released. No one was prosecuted for the deaths that occurred during the riots. Gradually blacks were allowed to return to work and defense production was resumed.

== In film ==
The Example is a 2016 short film about the riot written by Gordon S. Williams and directed by Wyatt Cagle.

== See also ==
- List of incidents of civil unrest in the United States
