= Red River County, Texas =

County in Texas, United States

- County
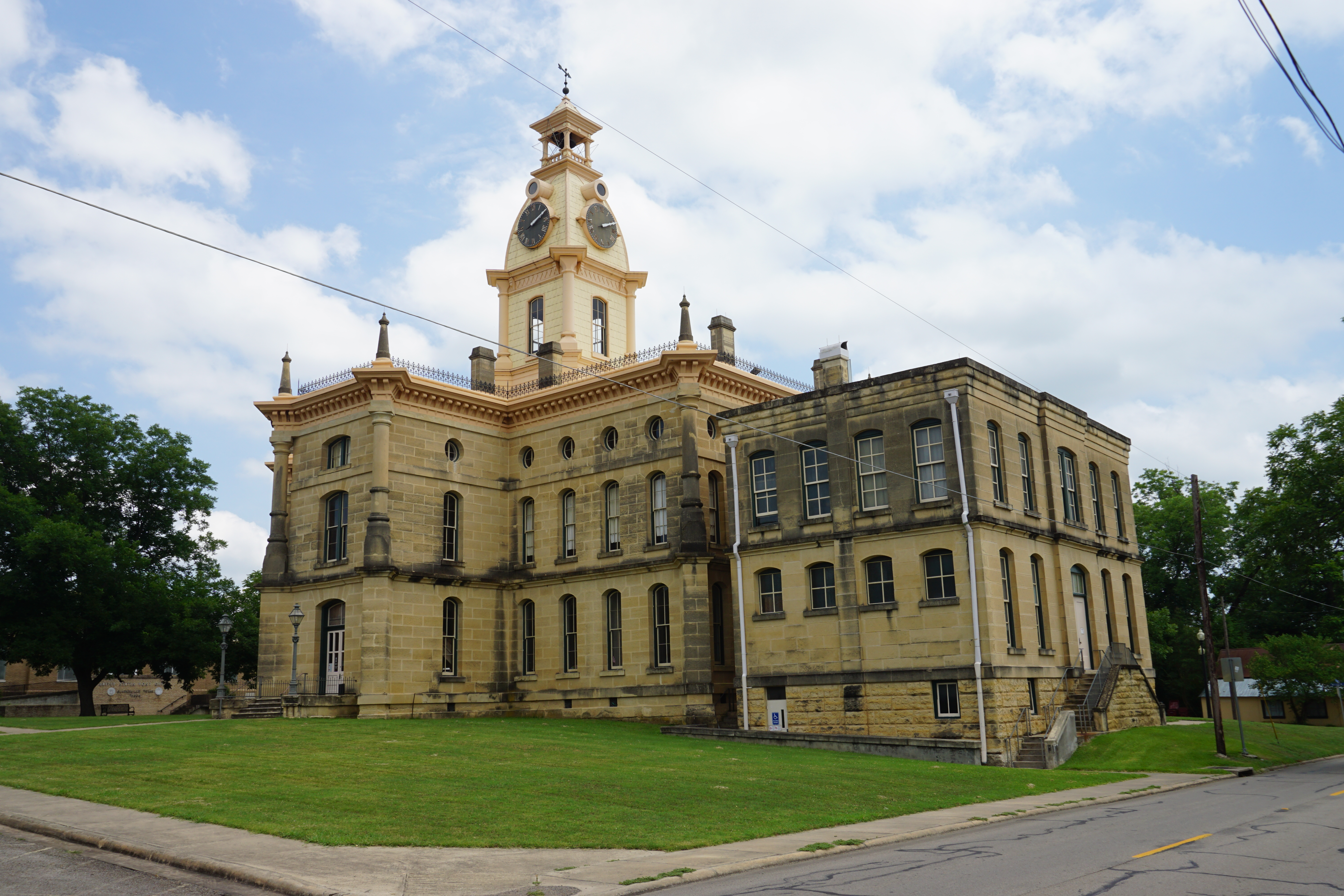
- Red River County Courthouse

- Location within the U.S. state of Texas
- Coordinates: 33°37′N 95°03′W
- Country: United States
- State: Texas
- Founded: 1837
- Named for: Red River of the South
- Seat: Clarksville
- Largest city: Clarksville

Area
  - Total: 1,057 sq mi (2,740 km^{2})
  - Land: 1,037 sq mi (2,690 km^{2})
  - Water: 20 sq mi (52 km^{2}) 1.9%

Population (2020)
  - Total: 11,587
  - Estimate (2025): 11,816 ▲
  - Density: 11.17/sq mi (4.314/km^{2})
- Time zone: UTC−6 (Central)
  - Summer (DST): UTC−5 (CDT)
- Congressional districts: 1st, 4th
- Website: www.co.red-river.tx.us

Red River County is a county in the U.S. state of Texas. As of the 2020 census, its population was 11,587. Its county seat is Clarksville. The county was created in 1835 and organized in 1837. It is named for the Red River, which forms its northern boundary. Red River County was the birthplace of John Nance Garner, 32nd Vice President of the United States.

== Geography ==
According to the U.S. Census Bureau, the county has a total area of 1,057 square miles (2,740 km^{2}), of which 20 sq mi (52 km^{2}) (1.9%) are covered by water.

=== Rivers and lakes ===
- Sulphur River
- Red River
- Shawnee Creek
- Brevelle Lake

=== Major highways ===
- U.S. Highway 82
- U.S. Highway 271
- State Highway 37
- Spur 38

=== Adjacent counties ===
- McCurtain County, Oklahoma (north)
- Bowie County (east)
- Morris County (southeast)
- Titus County (south)
- Franklin County (southwest)
- Delta County (southwest)
- Lamar County (west)
- Choctaw County, Oklahoma (northwest)

== Communities ==
=== Cities ===
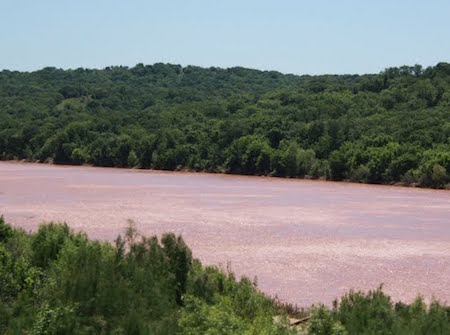
Red River, Texas

- Bogata
- Clarksville (county seat)
- Deport (mostly in Lamar County)
- Detroit

=== Towns ===
- Annona
- Avery

=== Unincorporated communities ===
- Aikin Grove
- Albion
- Bagwell
- Boxelder
- Cuthand
- English
- Maple
- Negley
- Peters Prairie
- McCoinville

=== Ghost town ===
- Opah

== Demographics ==
Historical population
Census	Pop.	Note	%±
1850	3,906		—
1860	8,535		118.5%
1870	10,653		24.8%
1880	17,194		61.4%
1890	21,452		24.8%
1900	29,893		39.3%
1910	28,564		−4.4%
1920	35,829		25.4%
1930	30,923		−13.7%
1940	29,769		−3.7%
1950	21,851		−26.6%
1960	15,682		−28.2%
1970	14,298		−8.8%
1980	16,101		12.6%
1990	14,317		−11.1%
2000	14,314		0.0%
2010	12,860		−10.2%
2020	11,587		−9.9%
2025 (est.)	11,816	▲	2.0%
U.S. Decennial Census; 1850–2010 2010–2020

=== Racial and ethnic composition ===
Red River County, Texas – Racial and ethnic composition Note: the US Census treats Hispanic/Latino as an ethnic category. This table excludes Latinos from the racial categories and assigns them to a separate category. Hispanics/Latinos may be of any race.
Race / Ethnicity (NH = Non-Hispanic)	Pop 1980	Pop 1990	Pop 2000	Pop 2010	Pop 2020	% 1980	% 1990	% 2000	% 2010	% 2020
White alone (NH)	12,505	11,107	10,868	9,503	8,499	77.67%	77.58%	75.93%	73.90%	73.35%
Black or African American alone (NH)	3,221	2,857	2,538	2,211	1,738	20.00%	19.96%	17.73%	17.19%	15.00%
Native American or Alaska Native alone (NH)	72	61	79	92	102	0.45%	0.43%	0.55%	0.72%	0.88%
Asian alone (NH)	17	14	17	23	51	0.11%	0.10%	0.12%	0.18%	0.44%
Native Hawaiian or Pacific Islander alone (NH)	x	x	1	0	0	x	x	0.01%	0.00%	0.00%
Other race alone (NH)	6	5	3	3	13	0.04%	0.03%	0.02%	0.02%	0.11%
Mixed race or Multiracial (NH)	x	x	139	179	418	x	x	0.97%	1.39%	3.61%
Hispanic or Latino (any race)	280	273	669	849	766	1.74%	1.91%	4.67%	6.60%	6.61%
Total	16,101	14,317	14,314	12,860	11,587	100.00%	100.00%	100.00%	100.00%	100.00%

=== 2020 census ===
As of the 2020 census, the county had a population of 11,587. The median age was 48.0 years. 19.9% of residents were under the age of 18 and 25.0% of residents were 65 years of age or older. For every 100 females there were 98.1 males, and for every 100 females age 18 and over there were 95.8 males age 18 and over.

<0.1% of residents lived in urban areas, while 100.0% lived in rural areas.

There were 5,085 households in the county, of which 25.2% had children under the age of 18 living in them. Of all households, 45.0% were married-couple households, 21.3% were households with a male householder and no spouse or partner present, and 29.4% were households with a female householder and no spouse or partner present. About 33.1% of all households were made up of individuals and 17.8% had someone living alone who was 65 years of age or older.

There were 6,134 housing units, of which 17.1% were vacant. Among occupied housing units, 73.0% were owner-occupied and 27.0% were renter-occupied. The homeowner vacancy rate was 2.1% and the rental vacancy rate was 9.4%.

=== 2000 census ===
As of the 2000 census, 14,314 people, 5,827 households, and 4,067 families resided in the county. From the 2000 census, the population density was 14 people per square mile (5.4 people/km^{2}). The 6,916 housing units had an average density of 7 units per square mile (2.7/km^{2}). The racial makeup of the county was 78.04% White, 17.80% African American, 0.59% Native American, 0.12% Asian, 2.30% from other races, and 1.15% from two or more races. About 4.67% of the population were Hispanics or Latinos of any race.

Of the 5,827 households, 28.0% had children under 18 living with them, 53.5% were married couples living together, 11.8% had a female householder with no husband present, and 30.2% were not families. About 27.7% of all households were made up of individuals, and 14.6% had someone living alone who was 65 or older. The average household size was 2.41 and the average family size was 2.91.

In the county, the age distribution was 23.9% under 18, 7.8% from 18 to 24, 24.4% from 25 to 44, 24.3% from 45 to 64, and 19.7% who were 65 or older. The median age was 40 years. For every 100 females, there were 92.9 males. For every 100 females 18 and over, there were 89.8 males.

The median income for a household in the county was $27,558 and for a family was $33,436. Males had a median income of $24,609 versus $17,566 for females. The per capita income for the county was $15,058, making it one of the economically poorest counties in the state of Texas. About 13.1% of families and 17.3% of the population were below the poverty line, including 25.2% of those under 18 and 17.7% of those 65 or over.

== Education ==
Thesse school districts serve Red River County:

- Avery Independent School District (ISD)
- Clarksville ISD
- Detroit ISD
- Prairiland ISD (mostly in Lamar County)
- Rivercrest ISD (partly in Titus County, small portion in Franklin County)

Areas in Clarksville ISD, Detroit ISD, Prairiland ISD, and Rivercrest ISD (formerly Talco-Bogata CISD) within this county are assigned to Paris Junior College. Areas in Avery ISD are assigned to Texarkana College.

== Notable people ==
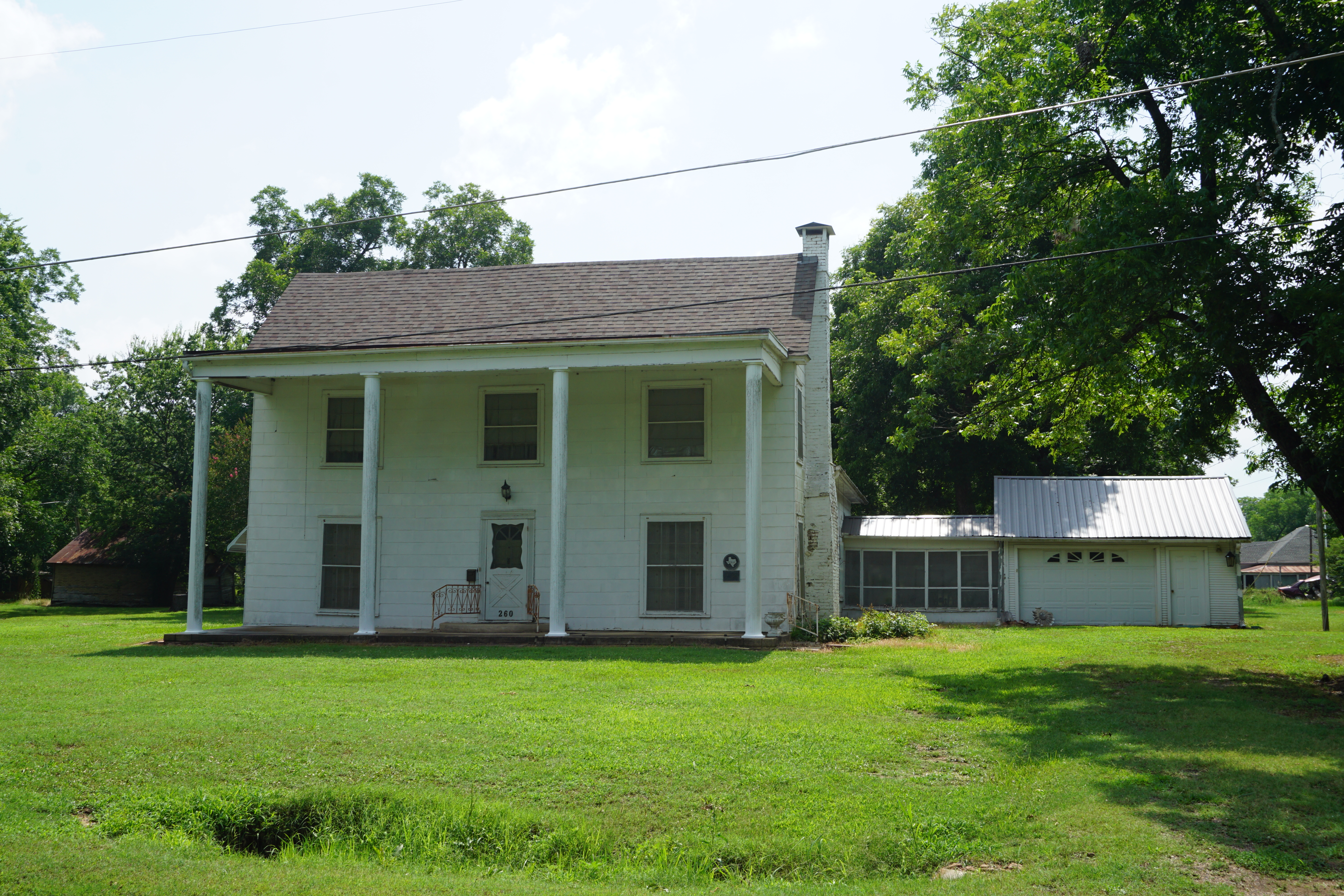
The John Nance Garner Home in Detroit

- Jean Baptiste Brevelle (1698–1754), early 18th century explorer, trader and soldier of Fort Saint Jean Baptiste des Natchitoches and Le Poste des Cadodaquious, the first European settlement in the area. Namesake of Brevelle Lake.
- Edward H. Tarrant (1799–1867), for whom Tarrant County was named, lived in Red River County when he first moved to Texas in the 1830s.
- John "Cactus Jack" Garner (1868–1967), Vice President of the U.S. who served for eight years under President F. D. Roosevelt, was born in Red River County, in 1868.
- Jim Leavelle (1920–2019), Dallas homicide detective, who became renowned for escorting Lee Harvey Oswald when Oswald was shot by Jack Ruby, was born here in 1920.
- John Edward Williams (1922–1994) author, editor and professor known for his novels Butcher's Crossing (1960), Stoner (1965), and Augustus (1972), which won a U.S. National Book Award.
- William Humphrey (1924–1997), author of Home from the Hill and The Ordways and other works was born and raised in Red River County. Home from the Hill was made into a movie starring George Hamilton among other great stars.
- J. D. Tippit (1924–1963), Dallas policeman, who was shot to death a short time after the John F. Kennedy assassination. A monument to J.D. Tippit is located on Highway 37 South. He was born and raised in Red River County.
- Tommie Smith (1944–), set the world and Olympic records with a time of 19.83 seconds and became the 200-meter Olympic champion at the 1968 Summer Olympics, which were held in Mexico

== Politics ==
Red River County is represented, as of January 2015, in the Texas House of Representatives by the Republican Gary VanDeaver, the former superintendent of the New Boston Independent School District in New Boston, Texas.

Red River County is located within District 1 of the Texas House of Representatives. Red River County is located within District 1 of the Texas Senate.

United States presidential election results for Red River County, Texas
Year	Republican		Democratic		Third party(ies)	
Year	No.	%	No.	%	No.	%
1912	255	12.11%	1,498	71.13%	353	16.76%
1916	356	14.11%	2,021	80.10%	146	5.79%
1920	799	22.58%	2,263	63.96%	476	13.45%
1924	311	8.78%	3,183	89.84%	49	1.38%
1928	1,172	41.30%	1,666	58.70%	0	0.00%
1932	145	4.35%	3,181	95.44%	7	0.21%
1936	199	6.89%	2,685	93.00%	3	0.10%
1940	555	12.45%	3,899	87.46%	4	0.09%
1944	466	12.19%	2,991	78.24%	366	9.57%
1948	323	8.16%	2,987	75.49%	647	16.35%
1952	1,964	36.04%	3,484	63.93%	2	0.04%
1956	1,956	43.14%	2,567	56.62%	11	0.24%
1960	1,527	34.79%	2,850	64.94%	12	0.27%
1964	1,257	27.01%	3,391	72.86%	6	0.13%
1968	1,305	25.57%	2,245	43.99%	1,554	30.45%
1972	3,112	69.54%	1,361	30.41%	2	0.04%
1976	1,852	33.47%	3,670	66.33%	11	0.20%
1980	2,225	38.54%	3,501	60.64%	47	0.81%
1984	2,979	54.05%	2,518	45.68%	15	0.27%
1988	2,475	43.79%	3,165	56.00%	12	0.21%
1992	1,735	30.68%	2,686	47.50%	1,234	21.82%
1996	1,783	39.06%	2,339	51.24%	443	9.70%
2000	2,941	56.54%	2,219	42.66%	42	0.81%
2004	3,379	61.55%	2,097	38.20%	14	0.26%
2008	3,461	68.51%	1,539	30.46%	52	1.03%
2012	3,549	69.94%	1,482	29.21%	43	0.85%
2016	3,926	76.07%	1,149	22.26%	86	1.67%
2020	4,517	77.72%	1,246	21.44%	49	0.84%
2024	4,682	80.78%	1,103	19.03%	11	0.19%

United States Senate election results for Red River County, Texas1
Year	Republican		Democratic		Third party(ies)	
Year	No.	%	No.	%	No.	%
2024	4,498	78.40%	1,148	20.01%	91	1.59%

United States Senate election results for Red River County, Texas2
Year	Republican		Democratic		Third party(ies)	
Year	No.	%	No.	%	No.	%
2020	4,452	77.67%	1,191	20.78%	89	1.55%

Texas Gubernatorial election results for Red River County
Year	Republican		Democratic		Third party(ies)	
Year	No.	%	No.	%	No.	%
2022	3,482	81.47%	764	17.88%	28	0.66%

== See also ==
- National Register of Historic Places listings in Red River County, Texas
- Recorded Texas Historic Landmarks in Red River County
