= Aikin Grove, Texas =

- Unincorporated community
- Location within Texas Location within the United States
- Coordinates: 33°33′20″N 95°02′55″W
- Country: United States
- State: Texas
- County: Red River
- Elevation: 377 ft (115 m)
- Time zone: UTC-6 (Central (CST))
  - Summer (DST): UTC-5 (CDT)
- Area codes: 430 & 903
- GNIS feature ID: 1379325

Aikin Grove (also Aiken Grove) is an unincorporated community in Red River County, Texas, United States.

== Notable person ==
A. M. Aikin, Jr. (1905–1981), Texas state representative, was born in Aikin Grove.
