= A. M. Aikin Jr. =

American politician (1905–1981)

Member of the Texas Senate from the 1st district
- In office January 3, 1953 - January 9, 1979
- Preceded by: Howard A. Carney
- Succeeded by: Vernon Edgar Howard

Member of the Texas Senate from the 8th district
- In office January 12, 1937 - January 3, 1953
- Preceded by: Tom A. DeBerry
- Succeeded by: George Parkhouse

Member of the Texas House of Representatives from the 37th district
- In office January 10, 1933 - January 12, 1937
- Preceded by: Wilburn Haywood Wiggs
- Succeeded by: Thomas David Wells Jr.

Personal details
- Born: October 9, 1905 Aikin Grove, Texas, U.S.
- Died: October 24, 1981 (aged 76) Paris, Texas, U.S.
- Party: Democratic
- Spouse: Welma Morphew
- Children: 1
- Education: Paris Junior College; Cumberland University
- Occupation: Lawyer and haberdasher

Alexander Mack Aikin Jr. (October 9, 1905 – October 24, 1981) was an American politician who served in the Texas House of Representatives and the Texas Senate as a Democrat. He was elected to the House of Representatives in 1932, and after serving two terms was elected to the Senate in 1937. In total, he served for 46 years in the two chambers of the Texas Legislature, making him the longest-tenured legislator in the history of Texas at the time of his retirement in January 1979.

Aikin earned a reputation as a staunch supporter of education, and was given the honorific "the father of modern Texas education". He is best known for working with Governor Beauford H. Jester to pass the Gilmer-Aikin Act of 1949.

Aikin served on the Senate Finance Committee from 1937 to 1979; he was also the chair of the committee from 1967 until 1979. In 1943, Aikin also served as president pro tempore of the Senate and, in the absence of Governor Coke R. Stevenson and the Lieutenant Governor, as acting governor for 14 days. The A. M. and Welma Aikin Regional Archives and the A. M. Aikin Symposium at Paris Junior College (PJC), as well as two chairs at the University of Texas at Austin, have been named in his honor.

== Early life ==
Alexander Mack Aikin Jr. was born on October 9, 1905, in Aikin Grove, Red River County, Texas. His family moved to Lamar County in 1907, and Aikin attended grade school in Milton and high school in Deport. He then attended Paris Junior College (PJC) in Paris and Cumberland University in Lebanon, Tennessee, the latter of which he graduated from with a Bachelor of Laws degree in 1932.

== Political career ==
A member of the Democratic Party, Aikin's political career began in 1932 with his election to the Texas House of Representatives. In 1937, after serving two terms in the House of Representatives, he was elected to the Texas Senate. From 1948 onwards, he did not face an opponent in any election that he contested. In total, he served for 46 years in the two chambers of the Texas Legislature, making him the longest-tenured legislator in the history of Texas at the time of his retirement in January 1979. During his entire political career, he missed only two and a half days that the legislature was in session.

Aikin earned a reputation as a staunch supporter of education, and according to Daisy Harvill "he supported every major educational bill passed by the legislature" and was given the honorific "the father of modern Texas education". Among his most significant legislative achievements were his sponsorship of the 1933 bill that established the Teacher Retirement System, which became a constitutional amendment in 1937; his cosponsoring of the 1949 Gilmer-Aikin Act of 1949 (with Representative Claud Gilmer of Rocksprings), which established a centralized, statewide education system along with the Minimum Foundation school program that guaranteed funding levels for public schools and minimum teachers' salaries procured by the state; and his sponsorship of a 1956 amendment to set $100 a month as the minimum retirement compensation for teachers in an effort to attract better talent to the profession. Aikin was also an advocate for all-weather farm roads, largely because of the increased accessibility that they provided to schools, as well as the M. D. Anderson Hospital, the principal cancer treatment center in Texas.

Aikin served on the Senate Finance Committee, which is charged with handling state budget and tax bills, from his election to the Texas Senate in 1937 to his retirement in 1979; he was also the chair of the committee from 1967 until 1979. In 1943, he served as president pro tempore of the Senate and, in the absence of Governor Coke R. Stevenson and the Lieutenant Governor, as acting governor for 14 days. During his brief tenure as acting governor, Aikin briefly declared martial law in Beaumont due to a race riot; he did so at the request of local officials and with the approval of Governor Stevenson. Aikin became dean of the Senate in 1963, and dean emeritus upon his retirement in 1979.

== Personal life ==
Outside of his political career, Aikin worked as the senior partner in both the law firm Aikin & Townsend and Aikin's Men's Wear haberdashery, both in Paris. In 1929, he married Welma Morphew, a landscape beautification advocate and future PJC regent with whom he had one son. Aikin died on October 24, 1981, at St. Joseph's Hospital in Paris, at the age of 76; he had been hospitalized since September 6. His funeral was held at First United Methodist Church in Paris on October 26, where he was eulogized by United States Senator Jack English Hightower of Vernon and former State Senator A. R. "Babe" Schwartz of Galveston. He was also memorialized on October 29 with a brief service in the Texas Senate in which he was eulogized by Lieutenant Governor William P. Hobby Jr. and once again by State Senator Schwartz.

== Legacy ==
Aikin was honored with the proclamation of "A. M. Aikin Day" in 1973, during which his portrait was hung in the Texas Senate chamber, "a rare honor for a lawmaker who was still serving".

Aikin was further honored with the establishment of the A. M. and Welma Aikin Regional Archives at PJC's Mike Rheudasil Learning Center in 1978. It serves as a repository for his personal papers in addition to showcasing a gallery exhibit and a replica of his Texas Senate office, as well as a reading room for researchers. The Aikin Regional Archives additionally contains local and regional history collections, including manuscripts, maps, newspapers, photographs, and other documents, as well as local government records from Delta, Fannin, Lamar, and Red River counties due to its status as a regional depository for the Texas State Library and Archives Commission.

In 1979, the A. M. Aikin Symposium was established at PJC as a two-day seminar for high school students addressing "fiscal responsibility in government".

Furthermore, the A. M. Aikin Regents Chair in Junior and Community College Education and the A. M. Aikin Regents Chair in Education Leadership were established in 1985 at the University of Texas at Austin. The total endowment of the two chairs was $1 million; former PJC president Louis B. Williams led the fundraising effort for the endowment, while the total gift of $500,000 was matched with funds from the Permanent University Fund to establish the memorial chairs.

== See also ==
- History of education in Texas#Gilmer-Aikin Act of 1949
