= History of education in Texas =

The history of education in Texas covers public and private schooling at the elementary, secondary and higher levels from the colonial era to the present.

In breaking away from Mexico in 1836, the grievances in the Declaration of Independence complained of the failure of the Mexican government "to establish any public system of education, although possessed of almost boundless resources." Texans learned that it would take many decades to build a public school system. In the meantime, they relied on tutors, private religious schools, and ad-hoc arrangements whereby a few neighbors would hire a teacher, and provide room and boarding and a room to teach in. State funding was promised time and again and rarely materialized.

Religion was a powerful force, with Baptists, Methodists, Catholics and smaller denominations setting up colleges in which most students were enrolled in from grades 1 to 12, with a minority in higher education. That minority grew larger in time until established private colleges flourished in the 20th century.

Washington entered the scene during Reconstruction, operating schools for the freed slaves. Outside philanthropists kept up schools for African Americans into the 20th century. After 1875, a statewide plan was in operation for towns and most rural areas. By 1900, the nationwide Progressive era inspired Texas reformers to modernize education, train teachers, and consolidate the surrounding one-room schools into a good school in the county seat, usually with a high school. Rural Texas resisted the reformers but they could not resist the strong forces of urbanization and industrialization. After 1947 the rural schools were consolidated. In the 1960s the legal segregation of Blacks and Hispanics ended. In the 1980s, upgrading performance in tests became a statewide priority, and the methods promoted in Texas became a national model.

== History ==
=== Before 1875 ===
Under Spain and Mexico, schooling was a low priority in Texas. As an independent country from 1836 to 1848, private schooling was a priority for the elite. As a state, Texas had difficulty establishing a good educational system.

Mirabeau B. Lamar, the second president of the independent Republic of Texas, is called the "Father of Texas Education" due to his pioneering efforts to establish the first public education system. He strongly emphasized the necessity of public education, famously stating that a "cultivated mind is the guardian genius of democracy." He convinced the legislature to set aside three leagues of land in each county to be devoted to school development. He also allotted 50 leagues of land for the eventual support of two universities, Texas A&M University in 1876, and the University of Texas in 1883. Although no facilities were constructed during his term, he provided the base for a statewide public school system with 18,000 acres of public land for public schools. In 1839, he founded the Texas State Library.

An ambitious 1854 law established public school districts with elected trustees to oversee education. Building costs and teachers' salaries were to be funded by the state. However, due to insufficient funds and citizens' reluctance to pay taxes, the plan failed. The fund provided only $1.50 per student per year, far too little to support any school. Later funding schemes set aside revenue from sales of government-owned land. However, the land was then pledged to proposed railroads, which defaulted, so very little money went to education. All these failures meant that Texans lacked a formal public education system until the 1870s. There were very few public schools in operation.

Schooling was left to private initiative. Rich families had private tutors, whereas other families hired itinerant teachers who lived with parents and taught their children reading, writing, and arithmetic. Here and there, a private school was set up to provide basic education to children whose parents could afford tuition. More upscale academies offered Latin, Greek and geometry. Schools typically admitted both boys and girls, though some separated them by gender. Female institutes emphasized music and art but largely followed the same curriculum as boys' academies, including ancient languages and mathematics.

Campbell notes that there were numerous private schools that called themselves "colleges." Most of their students were in grades 1 through 12. Even early religious-affiliated schools like Baylor University, founded by Baptists in 1845, offered little actual college-level coursework. Wealthier Texans seeking higher education often sent their sons out of state. Over the years, successful colleges dropped their primary and secondary students and concentrated on a curriculum that resembled established schools back East. Their professors mostly taught Latin, Greek, philosophy, and math. There were few courses on English literature or science, and none on business. Students formed clubs that helped them educate each other and establish friendship networks that advanced all their careers. Academic achievement schools are difficult to assess due to the lack of structured curricula or formal degrees. Teachers, paid directly by students' families, faced limitations in enforcing rigorous standards.

Discipline issues were common, with schools sometimes hiring teachers for their ability to physically punish students. To maintain their reputations, schools held public examinations that were often rehearsed performances rather than genuine assessments of learning. Critics at the time dismissed these events as mere showmanship. Private school education was prohibitively expensive for most families. Tuition ranged from $15 for primary students to $30 for advanced instruction, with additional costs for music courses, books, supplies, and boarding. Given that land cost less than $10 per acre and a bale of cotton sold for under $50, few families could afford formal schooling for their children. Despite limited formal education, Campbell concludes that most Anglos in Texas were literate, as reflected in census reports and a thriving newspaper industry. By 1860, the state had three daily papers, three tri-weeklies, and sixty-five weeklies, covering a range of news and opinions. Though lacking extensive newsgathering infrastructure, these publications were driven by bold editors and strong political partisanship.

=== Rural vs. urban ===
Rural schools, typified by the iconic one-room schoolhouse, represent a foundational element in the educational and social development of Texas before the mid 20th century. These institutions were centers for basic literacy and numeracy and served as crucial community hubs, frequently becoming the focal point for social gatherings and political arguments. Farmers were proud of their neighborhood school, where their children learned and their daughters taught. They distrusted the towns, and consolidation meant losing their local school and sending the children to a professionalized institution in the town.

In 1913, there were 8,500 school districts in rural Texas and 590 in urban Texas. They educated 643,000 rural and 374,000 urban students. School property per student was worth $15 per rural student, and $59 per urban student. The annual spending came to $2.58 per rural student and $9.48 per urban. The cities and small towns were better-served in every regard compared to the rural hinterland. Teachers were more professional and better-paid. School facilities were much better, and the urban community moreso realized its need for educated skills to run business operations.

Until later the 20th century, the great majority of Texans lived in rural areas. The urban population of cities and towns with populations of over 2,500 grew from 9% of the state in 1880 to 17% in 1900 and 32% in 1920. The 50–50 mark was reached in the 1940s, and by 1950 the state was 63% urban. In the late 19th century, the typical rural school was a one-room old wooden building with minimal furniture and a board painted black. It was taught by a teenage daughter of a prominent local farmer who had graduated from high school (and perhaps a year of college but no diploma) and taught students until she got married; she lived at home and saved up her small salary. Textbooks were scarce. Attendance was sporadic; the farmers knew that their children would not have to attend when they were needed for work on the farm. They had a recess break, but there were no organized sports or clubs. The students learned the basics of reading, writing, and arithmetic, how to behave and take tests, and about schedules, assignments and promptness. Very few went on to attend high school. The community was strongly hostile to local taxes and preferred a state-funded school system.

Texas fully developed its common school system in 1911, extending secondary education to rural children for the first time. Before that, the prevailing belief was that elementary education alone was enough to prepare students for responsible citizenship. Even in 1884, the State Superintendent of Education argued that high school was unnecessary for shaping civic character. Early opposition to state public schools in Texas came from church leaders and academics who favored private and church-run academies. Prominent educators such as William Carey Crane and Robert Lewis Dabney opposed state-funded education into the late 19th century. While towns and cities managed to establish high schools, rural counties struggled due to insufficient public funding. As a result, a few tuition-based private and church academies became the main providers of rural secondary education, leaving poor rural families helpless.

==== 1924 state survey ====
A fundamental disagreement existed within Texas education: the education profession championed efficiency and academic rigor to prepare students for college and especially for the industrial job market and allowed room for vocational high school programs to include attention to agriculture, but few farm boys attended high school. In sharp contrast, rural citizens viewed schools as vital for community stability, identity, and the transmission of values. As long as the rural population outnumbered the urban, they had the political power to protect their way of life.

Determined to upgrade all of Texas, reformers obtained a grant from the state to bring in nationally prominent experts to do an in-depth study in 1924 comparing school districts, ranging from modern city and town schools, to traditional one-room to four-room rural districts. As expected, they found that the data regarding buildings, supplies, training of teachers, and days in session demonstrated that rural schools trailed far behind. They turned to students to assess how well they have learned reading, spelling, arithmetic and geography, and how much they have improved between the third and seventh grades. As expected, third graders in rural districts had lower test scores in each subject—the farm children knew about animals and plants, tools and the weather, but those topics were not on the exams.

In the third grade, the urbanites—many with white-collar parents—got higher scores in all the 3 Rs. The unexpected result was that, between grades 3 and 7, rural students gained an equal amount of (but usually more) points compared to their urban counterparts. Even when they had far fewer days to learn, they narrowed the gap. To the experts' surprise, every statistical test indicated that one-room schools were superior in terms of how much and how fast students learned the 3 Rs. The final report stated: "It would appear from our data that the conclusions commonly reached regarding the ineffectiveness of the small school as compared with larger schools are unwarranted. Small schools rather than showing ineffectiveness, are slightly superior." The experts suppressed the report and locked up all the material until a historian rediscovered their files six decades later. The experts and reformers simply went quiet. Ultimately, the forces of urbanization, the New Deal, and World War II sealed the fate of small rural school districts.

=== Gilmer-Aikin Act of 1949 ===
After Beauford H. Jester, a Democrat, was re-elected to a second term as governor in 1948, he collaborated with A. M. Aikin Jr. to pass the most extensive education reforms in state history through the Gilmer-Aikin Act. It was the first comprehensive system for public school funding in Texas. It was a series of three bills that significantly impacted Texas education by raising teacher salaries, consolidating school districts, and providing state funding for equalization. The reform also established the Texas Education Agency and guaranteed all Texas children the opportunity to attend public school for twelve years with a minimum of 175 actual teaching days per year. The laws consolidated 4,500 rural school districts into 2,900 more efficient administrative units. The pay scale for teachers was raised, with a minimum annual salary of $2000. Local taxes were supplemented with state money to equalize spending across the new school districts. Districts could obtain more money by decreasing non-attendance. Aid to rural schools was increased from $28 million biannually to $36 million biannually. The same pay scales applied to Ango, Hispanic and Black teachers. The new laws did not affect higher education. Nor did they apply to private schools or parochial schools operated by the Catholic Church. The laws did not change the legal requirement for segregation of Black schools. Hispanic students mostly attended all-Hispanic schools, although their segregation was not required by law.

=== Governor George W. Bush ===
Texas had a mediocre record in terms of public education. As governor 1995 to 2000, George W. Bush made it a high Republican Party priority to improve the system. He supported local control of schools, higher educational standards, and an updated academic curriculum. His program featured standardized testing, school accountability, and funding increases. He supported efforts to ensure all students could read by third grade and backed a law to end automatic grade promotion without meeting standards. His administration helped revise Texas' education code, aiming to simplify regulations. While his leadership was praised for maintaining reforms initiated before his tenure, some critics pointed to stagnant test scores, high dropout rates, and concerns about the impact of high-stakes testing on minority students.

Bush, running successfully for president in 2000, boasted about his accomplishments regarding Texas education. He promised to expand them to the whole country. He adopted the slogan "No Child Left Behind" and led Congress to enact the No Child Left Behind Act in 2001.

== Catholic girls’ schools ==
The Catholic Church, through various religious orders for sisters, established several significant girls’ schools across Texas from the mid-19th century onward. These schools were instrumental in providing academic, spiritual, and social education to generations of young women in Texas, and many of their traditions continue in successor institutions today.

School	Established	City	Notes
Ursuline Academy	1847	Galveston	Founded by seven Ursuline Sisters from New Orleans at the request of Bishop Jean M. Odin, this was the first Catholic day and boarding school for girls in Texas. The academy set the standard for Catholic girls’ education in the region and inspired the establishment of other Ursuline schools.
Ursuline Academy	1851	San Antonio	Established by Ursuline Sisters from both New Orleans and Galveston, it became the first girls’ school in San Antonio and served as a secondary and boarding school for girls.
Villa Maria Academy	1853	Brownsville	Founded by the Sisters of the Incarnate Word and Blessed Sacrament after their arrival in Galveston in 1852, this was another early Catholic girls’ school in Texas.
Incarnate Word Academy	1873	Houston	Established by the Sisters of the Incarnate Word and Blessed Sacrament, It is the oldest Catholic high school in Houston and was originally known as Incarnate Word Academy for Young Ladies.
Ursuline Academy of Dallas	1874	Dallas	Opened by six Ursuline nuns from Galveston at the request of Bishop Claude Marie Dubuis, this is the oldest continuously existing Catholic school in Dallas.
Sacred Heart Academy	1882	Hallettsville	Opened by the Sisters of the Incarnate Word and Blessed Sacrament, it began as a boarding school for girls and a day school for boys and girls.

== Hispanic-Latino-Chicano-Mexican Americans ==
The history of Hispanic education in Texas is marked by themes of segregation, assimilation, exclusion, community resistance, and the ongoing struggle for equality and cultural recognition within the education system.

The 1850 United States census shows that 74% of the Mexican Americans in San Antonio were illiterate, compared to 1% of the Anglos. The proportions in 1860 were 44% and 3%. According to historian Richard Griswold Del Castillo, the literacy gap stemmed from underdeveloped educational institutions in Mexico's northern frontier before 1836. The Catholic Church dominated education but failed to send enough priests to the region, leaving basic schooling neglected. Frequent Indian raids and filibuster disruptions made it difficult for towns to establish stable education. Additionally, the absence of a strong commercial economy and the influence of South Texas' aristocracy discouraged widespread literacy.

=== Segregation and discrimination ===
Hispanic, particularly Mexican American, students in Texas faced widespread segregation. By the 1880s, their access to rural schools gradually expanded, and in the 1890s, Mexican working-class children in urban areas were permitted to attend city schools. However, their education remained restricted to segregated elementary classes, with no opportunities for secondary or postsecondary education. While not always mandated by state law as it was for African Americans, de facto segregation was common, with separate "Mexican schools" established in many districts. These schools were typically underfunded, had inadequate facilities, and offered a lower quality of education compared to schools for Anglo students. Discriminatory practices included retention of Mexican American children in lower grades based on racial identity rather than academic ability, and sending most students into non-academic or vocational tracks.

=== Assimilation and suppression of language and culture ===
Public schools for Hispanic students often operated as "Americanization" institutions, aiming to assimilate students into Anglo culture. This included English-only instruction and a systematic exclusion of Mexican culture, community traditions, Catholicism, and the Spanish language. The schools were designed to reinforce Anglo-Protestant values. The community responded by providing support for Catholic parochial schools, which had no tax money and relied on teaching nuns who had taken vows of poverty. Some Hispanic communities also responded through preschool preparation, advocacy for more inclusive policies, and legal challenges to segregation and inequality.

Notable figures, such as George I. Sánchez, and organizations like LULAC League of United Latin American Citizens), played key roles in fighting for educational equality through litigation and activism, helping to dismantle segregation and discriminatory practices over time. The quest for educational equality has been a persistent theme, with Mexican Americans continually fighting for access to quality schooling, representation, and the preservation of their cultural heritage within the education system. Despite progress, significant academic achievement gaps have persisted between Hispanic and Anglo students.

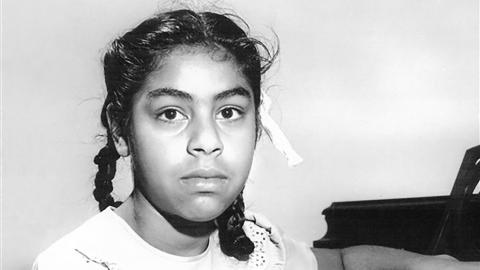
Sylvia Mendez, the plaintiff in the Mendez v. Westminster case

During the 1950s, LULAC (League of United Latin American Citizens) launched the Little School of the 400 program, which was designed to teach Mexican-American children 400 English words before they began first grade. The project was initially run by volunteers, and shown after the first class to be successful in preparing children to do better in school; out of 60 participating children, only one had to repeat the first grade. The program expanded, and LULAC convinced the Texas legislature to underwrite it. Between 1960 and 1964 over 92,000 children benefited from the LULAC-initiated, English-centered preschool program.

LULAC also sued school districts which practiced segregation. Examples of successful cases include Mendez v. Westminster in 1945 and Delgado v. Bastrop ISD in 1948. In the Mendez case, Thurgood Marshall, then a lawyer for the National Association for the Advancement of Colored People (NAACP) filed an amicus brief in support of LULAC. Marquez notes, "Relying strictly on the volunteer labor of LULAC attorneys and their staff, from 1950 to 1957, approximately fifteen suits or complaints were filed against school districts throughout the Southwest". These victories contributed precedents that were consulted in the deliberation by the United States Supreme Court in the Brown v. Board of Education (1954) case. In 1965, the 146 Councils were distributed among eight states, and by 1977, LULAC had offices in 21 states.

Benjamin Marquez asserts, "Segregated schools, inferior equipment, and the lack of qualified teachers were seen as the primary obstacles to the full economic and social assimilation of the Mexican American". LULAC believed that the public-school system, with the aforementioned issues corrected, would serve as a central instrument in the assimilation process of children, and thereby the Mexican-American community as a whole. It fully supported education of its members and adoption of fluent English. They believed that through formal education, Mexican Americans would learn how to function in American institutions, socialize with European-American children, and gain education to qualify for higher-skilled jobs.

== African Americans ==
=== Desegregation ===
San Antonio had relatively positive race relations and a clear desegregation policy, aided by its relatively small Black population, large Spanish American community, and military-driven economy that encouraged respect for the government. Texas observers noted that San Antonio enjoyed a reputation for good race relations. In July 1955, the city's school superintendent announced plans to begin integration that fall, supported by key proclamations ensuring state funding for desegregation efforts. The plan prioritized student distribution, school capacity, and minimizing educational disruption.

Initially, Black children in grades one and two could enroll in designated elementary schools or remain in all-Black schools. Limited transfers to formerly-white schools were allowed. Junior high and high school integration followed similar guidelines. By 1955, all special schools were desegregated on a free-choice basis with no violence. San Antonio's national reputation was further enhanced in 1960 when it became the first southern city to integrate its lunch counters. In 1965, the City Council passed an ordinance integrating all public accommodations.

Dallas had a more difficult experience, and leaders struggled to avoid national disgrace that followed the defiance to desegregation in Little Rock, Arkansas in 1957. Legal procedures dragged on slowly. Initial progress stalled for five years, but the turmoil in Little Rock prompted Dallas leaders to quietly prepare for integration. In 1961, token desegregation began; busing started in 1971 after federal courts ruled for it in Swann v. Charlotte-Mecklenburg Board of Education. Though flawed, the policy remained in effect. A new plan was implemented in 1976 restricted busing to fourth through eighth grades while empowering minority administrators. Despite these adjustments, white flight continued, reducing the white student population to just 7 percent in Dallas by 2003. By 1983, busing was widely regarded as unsuccessful, having failed to improve minority student outcomes. As a result, the focus shifted to educational reforms, yet ongoing district leadership challenges and racial tensions prolonged litigation until 2003.

The most serious protest came in 1956 when the federal court ordered the desegregation of Mansfield High School in the small town of Mansfield with 1,500 people. As an angry white crowd threatened Black students, Governor Allan Shivers sent in the Texas Rangers to escort the first three into the building. No one was hurt.

=== Historically Black colleges and universities ===
The African American community, aware that its students could not attend the all-white colleges and universities, created their own schools for higher education. Texas Southern University was formed in 1947 in order to create a law school so that Blacks would not have to admitted at the all-white University of Texas.

Other universities included Huston–Tillotson University, Jarvis Christian University, Paul Quinn College, Southwestern Christian College, St. Philip's College, Texas College; and Wiley University. Defunct universities include Bishop College and Guadalupe College.

The state set up Prairie View A&M University in 1876 at the end of Reconstruction, primarily as a normal school to train Black teachers for segregated schools.

== Higher education ==
During World War II, the main universities like the University of Texas and Texas A&M University gained a new national role. The wartime financing of university research, curricular change, campus trainee programs, and postwar veteran enrollments changed the tenor and allowed Texas schools to gain national stature.

From 1950 through the 1960s, Texas modernized and dramatically expanded its system of higher education. Under the leadership of Governor Connally, the state produced a long-range plan for higher education, a more rational distribution of resources, and a central state apparatus that managed state institutions with greater efficiency. Because of these changes, Texas universities received federal funds for research and development during the John F. Kennedy and Lyndon B. Johnson administrations.

== See also ==
- Juan Bautista Elguézabal
- History of education in the Southern United States
- League of United Latin American Citizens, LULAC
