= Opah, Texas =

Ghost town located in Red River County, Texas

Opah is a ghost town located in Red River County, Texas, United States. The town was situated on the Red River, north of Clarksville. Founded sometime in the 19th century, the town caved into the river in 1910.
