= Brevelle Lake =

Lake in Red River County, Texas

- Location within Texas Location within the United States
- Location: Red River County, Texas, United States
- Coordinates: 33°25′48″N 094°53′06″W
- Primary outflows: Shawnee Creek (Texas)
- Basin countries: United States

Brevelle Lake is a lake in Red River County, Texas. It is located near County Road 4621 and the towns of Avery, Texas and Annona, Texas. Below its dam is Shawnee Creek (Texas), which flows into the Sulphur River.

== History ==
The area was inhabited since time immemorial by tribes of the Caddo Confederacy.

The name Brevelle is from the French and is an ancient surname originating in the 1200s Normandy region of France from the Fief of Breville. The lake is named after Jean Baptiste Brevelle, a Parisian-born trader and soldier who was one of the first European explorers of the area in the early 1700s. As one of the original soldiers stationed at Fort St. Jean Baptiste des Natchitoches, he was briefly attached to the garrison at the newly established Le Poste des Cadodaquious (Le Posts des Nassonites) in nearby Bowie County, Texas. The site is the first European settlement in the Bowie and Red River Counties. Brevelle traveled along the Red, Sabine, and Trinity Rivers where he and his wife Anne des Cadeaux of the Adays and their 2 children lived among and traded with the Natchitoches, Hasinai, Adai, Nasoni, Yatasi, Tawakoni and Kadohadacho Indians.

== Terrain ==
Brevelle Lake is surrounded by slightly rolling hills and hardwood bottoms dominated by forests of oak, sweet gum, honey locust, and bois d'arc with limited native pine.

== Notable people ==
- Jean Baptiste Brevelle (1698-1754), early 18th century explorer, trader and soldier of Fort Saint Jean Baptiste des Natchitoches. Husband of Anne des Cadeaux and namesake of Brevelle Lake.
- Anne des Cadeaux Brevelle
- Jean-Baptiste Bénard de la Harpe

== Notable places ==
- Red River County, Texas
- Clarksville, Texas
- Le Poste des Cadodaquious
- Bowie County, Texas
- Isle Brevelle
- Bayou Brevelle
- St. Augustine Parish (Isle Brevelle) Church
- Sulphur River

== See also ==
- Adai Caddo Indians of Louisiana
- Adai people
- Caddo
