= Negley, Texas =

Unincorporated community in Texas, US

Coordinates: 33°45′36″N 95°05′07″W

Negley is an unincorporated community in Red River County, Texas, United States, approximately ten miles north of Clarksville. Located on Farm-to-Market Road 2118, Negley had a population of 136 in 2000.

== History ==
The area in north central Red River County was first settled in the 1880s. The community was built around a sawmill owned by W.C. Gough. A post office was established in 1892, and the town took the name Negley, for Oliver P. Negley, an early settler to the area. The post office was discontinued twice, first in 1908, (reopened in 1912) then again in the 1960s. Negley's population began to sharply decline in 1927, when the population decreased from 100 to 25 residents in half a dozen years. However, since then, the population has risen to about 136, despite no open businesses.

== Climate ==
The climate in this area is characterized by hot, humid summers and generally mild to cool winters. According to the Köppen Climate Classification system, Negley has a humid subtropical climate, abbreviated "Cfa" on climate maps.
