= Detroit Independent School District =

School district in Texas

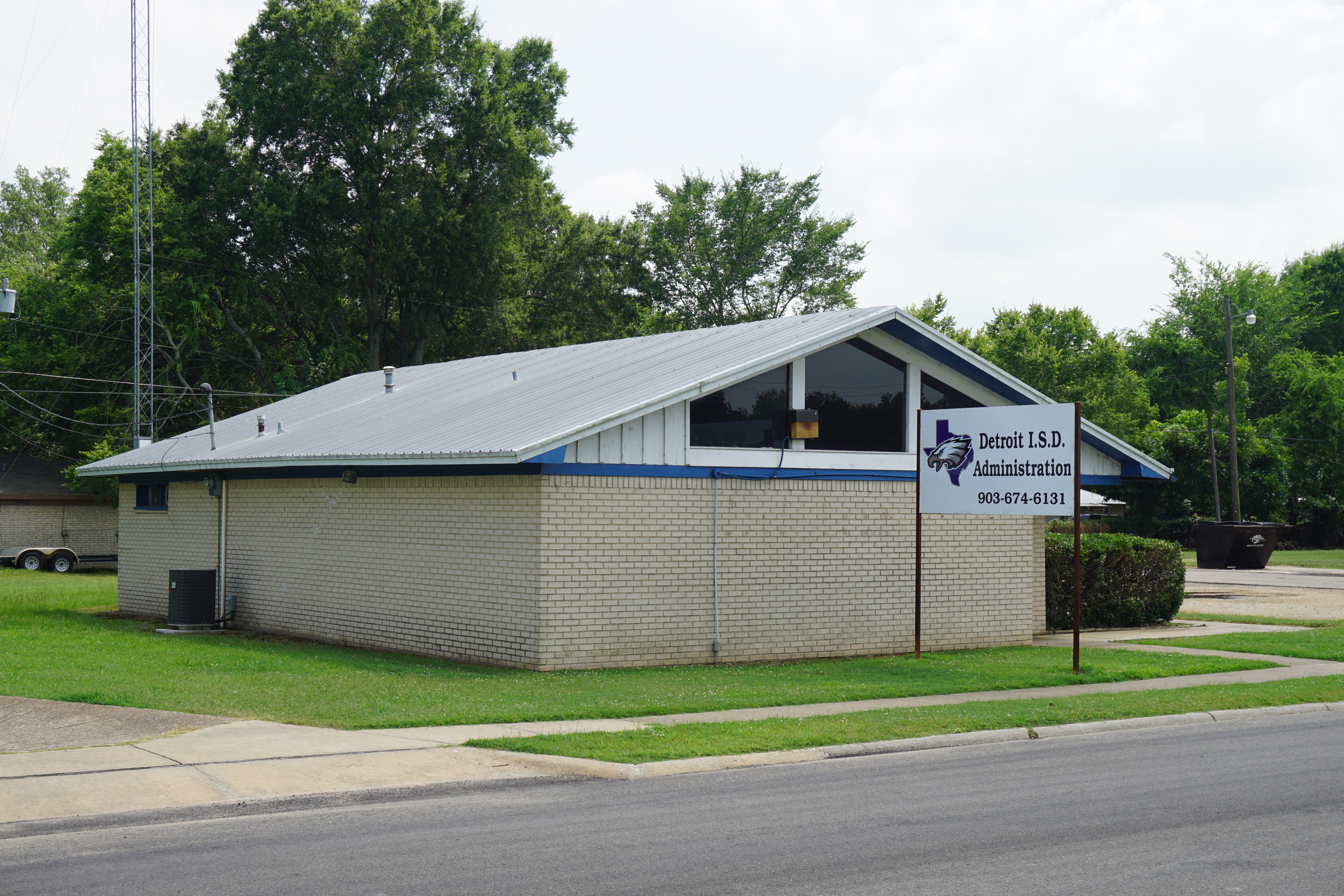
- Detroit I.S.D. Administration building

Location
- Detroit, Red River County; TX ESC Region 8 USA

District information
- Type: Public
- Motto: Soaring to greater heights of excellence
- Grades: Pre-K through 12
- Superintendent: Henry Sharp

Students and staff
- Athletic conference: UIL Class AA
- Colors: Blue and White

Other information
- Mascot: Eagle
- Website: Detroit ISD

Detroit Independent School District is a public school district based in Detroit in Red River County, Texas (USA). It is located about one hundred miles northeast of Dallas, near the Oklahoma border.

In 2009, the school district was rated "academically acceptable" by the Texas Education Agency.

== Schools ==
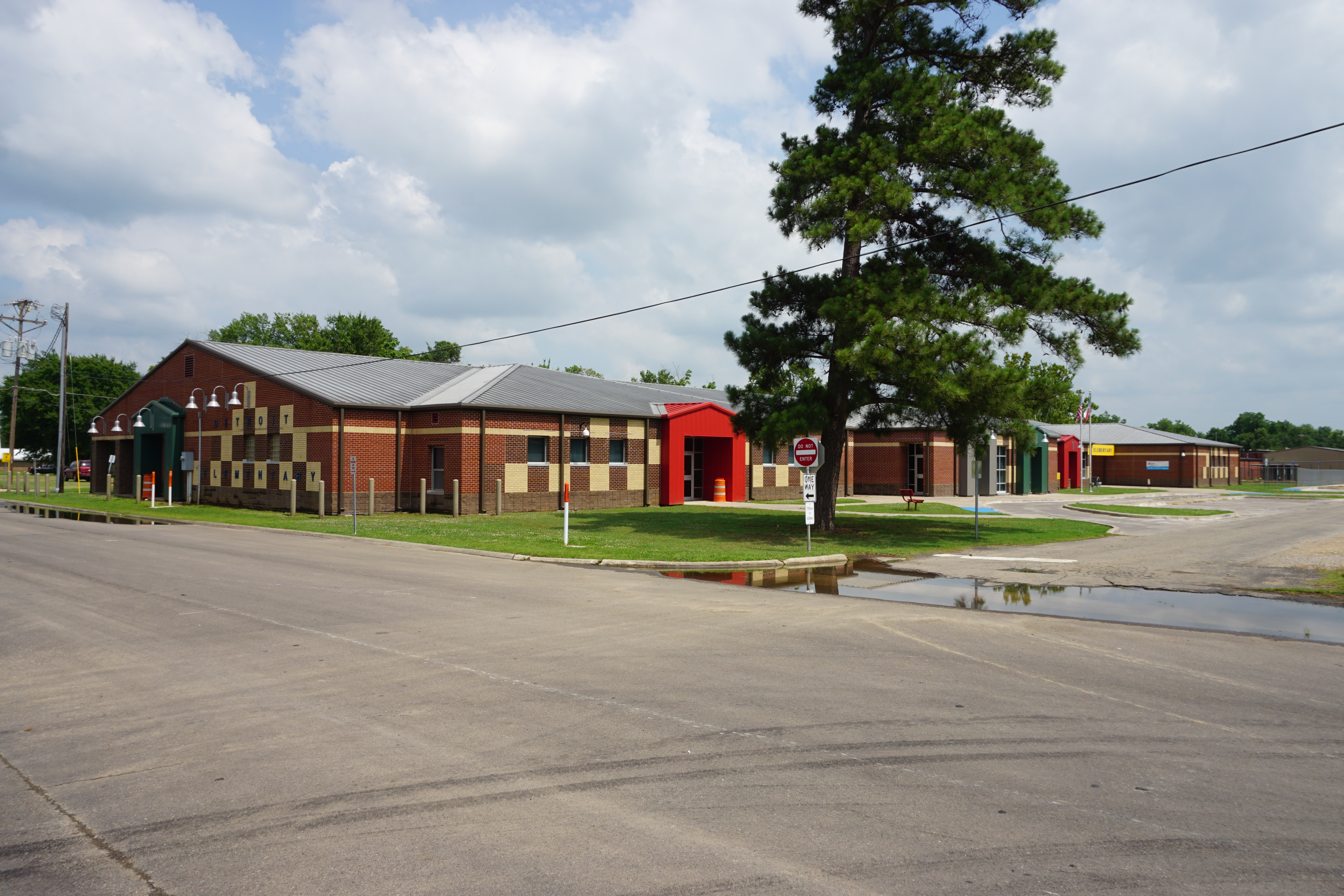
Detroit Elementary School

- Head Start Center (Head Start-PreK)
- Detroit Elementary School (Grades K-5)
- Detroit Middle School (Grades 6–8)
- Detroit High School (Grades 9–12)

== TEA Ratings ==
- Detroit High School and Middle School are both rated by the TEA (Texas Education Agency) as an Academically Acceptable campus, while the elementary school is rated as a Recognized Campus. In 2009, the overall passing rate for the TAKS test for students in grade 11 was 67%. The state average was 75%.

== District Data ==
- Detroit ISD currently has a total enrollment of 229 students, 144 of which are economically disadvantaged.^{4}
- Attendance rate: 96%
- The average salary for teachers is $30,618, while the average starting salary is $26,640.^{4}
- Diversity of student body: White - 80.9%, African American - 15.1%, Hispanic 2.7%, Other - 1.3%.
- The school annual conducts the Student Armed Services Aptitude Battery (SASVAB) test and has one 2010 graduate in the Army Reserve.
