= Maple, Red River County, Texas =

Unincorporated community in Texas, US

Coordinates: 33°27′35″N 94°59′46″W

Maple is an unincorporated community in Red River County, Texas, United States. It lies at an elevation of 377 feet (115 m).
