= Avery Independent School District =

School district in Texas

Location
- 150 San Antonio St. Avery, Texas ESC Region 8 USA
- Coordinates: 33°33′9″N 94°47′12″W

District information
- Type: Independent school district
- Grades: Pre-K through 12
- Superintendent: Jill Mahan
- Schools: 2 (2022-23)
- NCES District ID: 4809060

Students and staff
- Students: 322 (2022-23)
- Teachers: 33.49 (2022-23) (on full-time equivalent (FTE) basis)
- Student–teacher ratio: 9.61 (2022-23)
- Athletic conference: UIL Class 1A Basketball Division I
- District mascot: Bulldogs
- Colors: Maroon, White

Other information
- Website: Avery ISD

Avery Independent School District is a public school district based in Red River County, Avery, Texas (USA).

== Accountability Rating ==
In 2021, the district was rated "A" in student achievement, school progress, and closing the gaps; The district was also rated "B" in academic growth.

== Schools ==
In the 2022-2023 school year, the district operated two schools.

- Avery Secondary School (Grades 6–12)
- Avery Elementary School (Grades PK-5)

== Special programs ==
=== Athletics ===
Avery Secondary School participates in the boys' sports of basketball and cross country. The school also participates in the girls' sports of basketball, cross country, and volleyball.

== See also ==
- List of school districts in Texas
- List of high schools in Texas
