= John Sibley (doctor) =

American surgeon

- Born: May 19, 1757; Suffolk County, Massachusetts, U.S.
- Died: April 8, 1837 (aged 79)
- Occupations: Physician; Surgeon; Indian agent; Politician; Planter
- Known for: Service as Indian agent for the Orleans Territory
- Office: Member of the Louisiana State Senate
- Spouses: Elizabeth Hopkins (m. 1780; died 1790); Mary W. Winslow (m. 1791; died 1811)
- Children: George Champlin Sibley; Samuel Hopkins Sibley
- Relatives: Henry Hopkins Sibley (grandson)
- Military career
- Allegiance: United States
- Branch: Continental Army
- Rank: Surgeon's mate

John Sibley (May 19, 1757 – April 8, 1837) was an American physician, Indian agent, politician and planter. After serving as a surgeon's mate during the American Revolutionary War, he practiced medicine in Massachusetts and North Carolina before moving to Natchitoches, Louisiana, after the Louisiana Purchase. President Thomas Jefferson appointed Sibley as a contract surgeon for the Continental Army post at Natchitoches, and he served as Indian agent for the Orleans Territory from 1805 until his dismissal in 1814. He later served as a parish judge, militia officer and member of the Louisiana State Senate, and operated agricultural and commercial enterprises including cotton planting and salt manufacturing.

== Early life ==
Born in 1757, Sibley lived in Suffolk County, Massachusetts, until moving to Louisiana in 1803. In 1780, he married Elizabeth Hopkins, a daughter of theologian Samuel Hopkins. John and Elizabeth had two sons, George Champlin Sibley (April 1, 1782 – January 31, 1863), an American explorer and educator, and Samuel Hopkins Sibley, father of Confederate General Henry Hopkins Sibley. During the Revolutionary War, John Sibley was a surgeon's assistant, giving him the experience to continue his practice after the war; however, in 1784, John moved to Fayetteville, North Carolina and started his own newspaper, the Fayetteville Gazette. His wife and family soon joined him, but in 1790 his wife died. In 1791, Sibley married a widow named Mary W. Winslow.

== Work in the Louisiana Territory ==
In 1803, after the Louisiana Purchase, Sibley moved to Natchitoches and was hired by the Army as a contract surgeon for five years. In 1805, Sibley was named Indian agent for the Orleans Territory, a position he held until his dismissal in 1814. His diary and sketches of Native American tribes survive as evidence of early American Louisiana. Letters from Sibley to Thomas Jefferson have also survived; in them, Sibley described important political moments in early Louisiana, and gave the President reports on his one-on-one relationship with the inhabitants of the Louisiana territory, including Native Americans, Spaniards, and French. His letters also reveal the tension within the US government on how to handle the new territory, and whether or not they should heavily guard the border between Louisiana and Texas. In his position of Indian Agent of New Orleans, he was instructed to stay in contact with the Governor and the War Department, with populations, the names of important people, and their overall living situations, as well as to help smaller tribes prepare for land surveying by the government. Along with all of these duties, Sibley was to report any Native American tribes which seem that they would ally with either the American or Spanish forces within the area.

As Sibley's time in the Louisiana Territory passed, his family, who still lived in North Carolina, began suffering the rumors that he had abandoned them. However, Sibley had written a letter in 1808 that read, "I am making arrangements to remove my family from North Carolina to this place." By the time of Mary Winslow's death in 1811, though, they had yet to be removed. Over his life in the new territory, Sibley was involved in many professions, partially because of the connections he made with his government-issued letters of introduction, as well as the friendship he had formed in 1802 with William C. C. Claiborne, the future governor of the Louisiana territory. Due to these connections, Sibley became involved with myriad occupations, including being part of the Louisiana State Senate, becoming a colonel of a militia, a cattle farmer, a cotton planter, and a salt manufacturer, before dying in 1837.

== See also ==
- Adai people
- Natchitoches Parish, Louisiana
- Isle Brevelle
- Natchitoches, Louisiana
- Natchez, Louisiana
- Robeline, Louisiana
- Flora, Louisiana
- St. Augustine Parish (Isle Brevelle) Church
- Creole
