= Detroit, Texas =

- Town
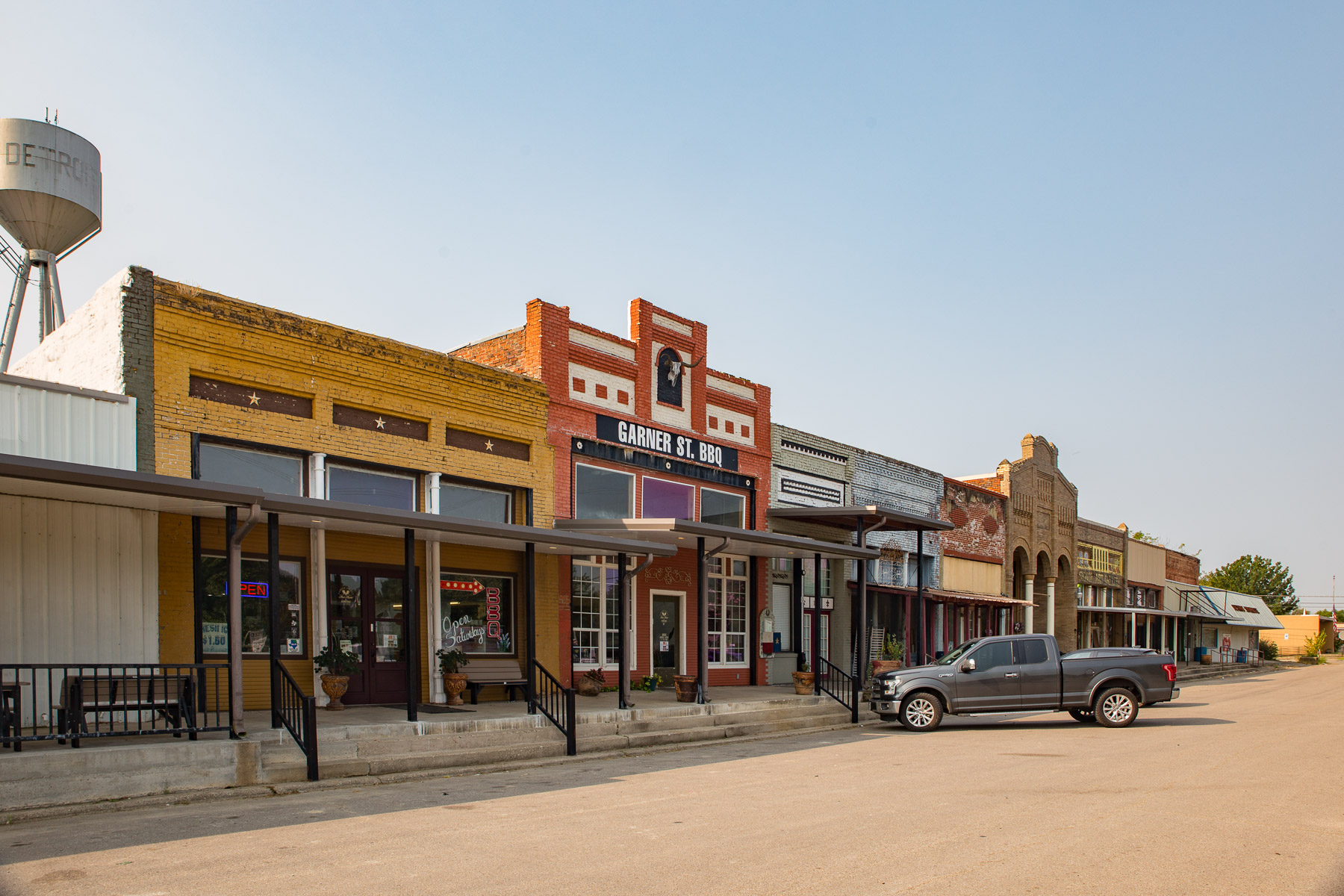
- U.S. Route 82 and East Garner Drive in Detroit

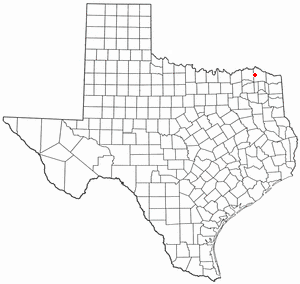
- Location of Detroit, Texas

- Coordinates: 33°39′37″N 95°15′59″W
- Country: United States
- State: Texas
- County: Red River

Area
  - Total: 1.58 sq mi (4.10 km^{2})
  - Land: 1.58 sq mi (4.10 km^{2})
  - Water: 0 sq mi (0.00 km^{2})
- Elevation: 482 ft (147 m)

Population (2020)
  - Total: 704
  - Density: 431.4/sq mi (166.55/km^{2})
- Time zone: UTC-6 (Central (CST))
  - Summer (DST): UTC-5 (CDT)
- ZIP code: 75436
- Area codes: 903, 430
- FIPS code: 48-20128
- GNIS feature ID: 2412421
- Website: detroittx.gov

Detroit is a town in Red River County, Texas, United States. The population was 704 at the 2020 census.

== Notable person ==
John Nance Garner, 32nd Vice President of the United States, was born outside of Detroit but lived most of his life in Uvalde, on the southern rim of the Texas Hill Country.

== Geography ==
According to the United States Census Bureau, the town has a total area of 1.6 square miles (4.1 km^{2}), all land.

== Demographics ==
Historical population
Census	Pop.	Note	%±
1940	1,064		—
1950	679		−36.2%
1960	576		−15.2%
1970	668		16.0%
1980	805		20.5%
1990	706		−12.3%
2000	776		9.9%
2010	732		−5.7%
2020	704		−3.8%
U.S. Decennial Census

Detroit racial composition as of 2020 (NH = Non-Hispanic) (Note: Note: the US Census treats Hispanic/Latino as an ethnic category. This table excludes Latinos from the racial categories and assigns them to a separate category. Hispanics/Latinos can be of any race.)
Race	Number	Percentage
White (NH)	578	82.1%
Black or African American (NH)	68	9.66%
Native American or Alaska Native (NH)	4	0.57%
Asian (NH)	1	0.14%
Some Other Race (NH)	3	0.43%
Mixed/Multi-Racial (NH)	27	3.84%
Hispanic or Latino	23	3.27%
Total	704	

As of the 2020 United States census, there were 704 people, 283 households, and 192 families residing in the town.

As of the census of 2000, there were 776 people, 315 households, and 217 families residing in the town. The population density was 490.7 inhabitants per square mile (189.5/km^{2}). There were 359 housing units at an average density of 227.0 per square mile (87.6/km^{2}). The racial makeup of the town was 78.35% White, 16.49% African American, 0.64% Native American, 1.68% from other races, and 2.84% from two or more races. Hispanic or Latino of any race were 2.58% of the population.

There were 315 households, out of which 33.0% had children under the age of 18 living with them, 48.6% were married couples living together, 16.2% had a female householder with no husband present, and 31.1% were non-families. 29.5% of all households were made up of individuals, and 15.6% had someone living alone who was 65 years of age or older. The average household size was 2.46 and the average family size was 3.06.

In the town, the population was spread out, with 29.4% under the age of 18, 8.5% from 18 to 24, 25.6% from 25 to 44, 20.7% from 45 to 64, and 15.7% who were 65 years of age or older. The median age was 34 years. For every 100 females, there were 83.5 males. For every 100 females age 18 and over, there were 80.3 males.

The median income for a household in the town was $25,250, and the median income for a family was $31,136. Males had a median income of $23,750 versus $17,250 for females. The per capita income for the town was $14,331. About 20.8% of families and 24.0% of the population were below the poverty line, including 34.4% of those under age 18 and 14.8% of those age 65 or over.

== Education ==
Detroit is served by the Detroit Independent School District.

== Gallery ==
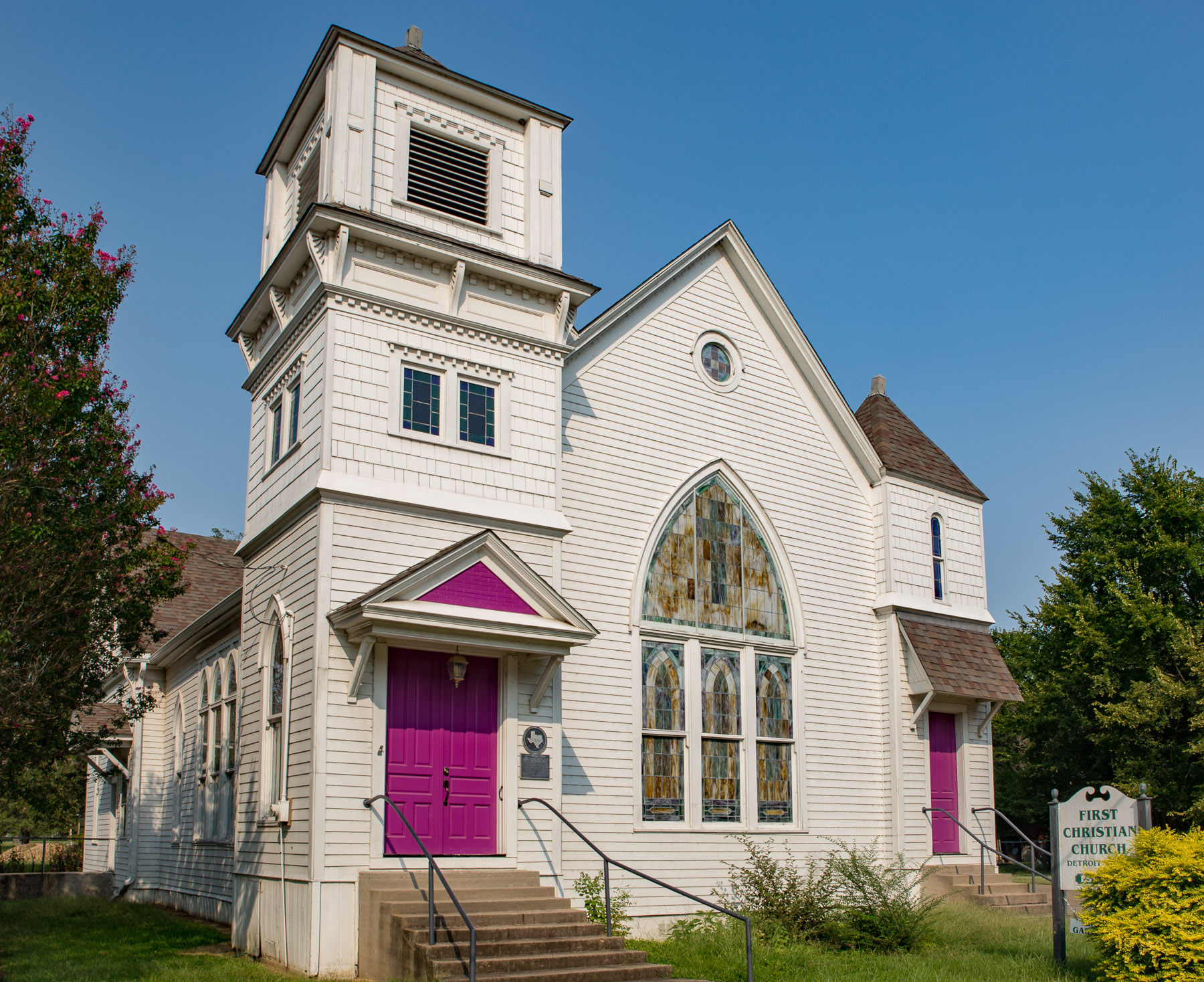
First Christian Church

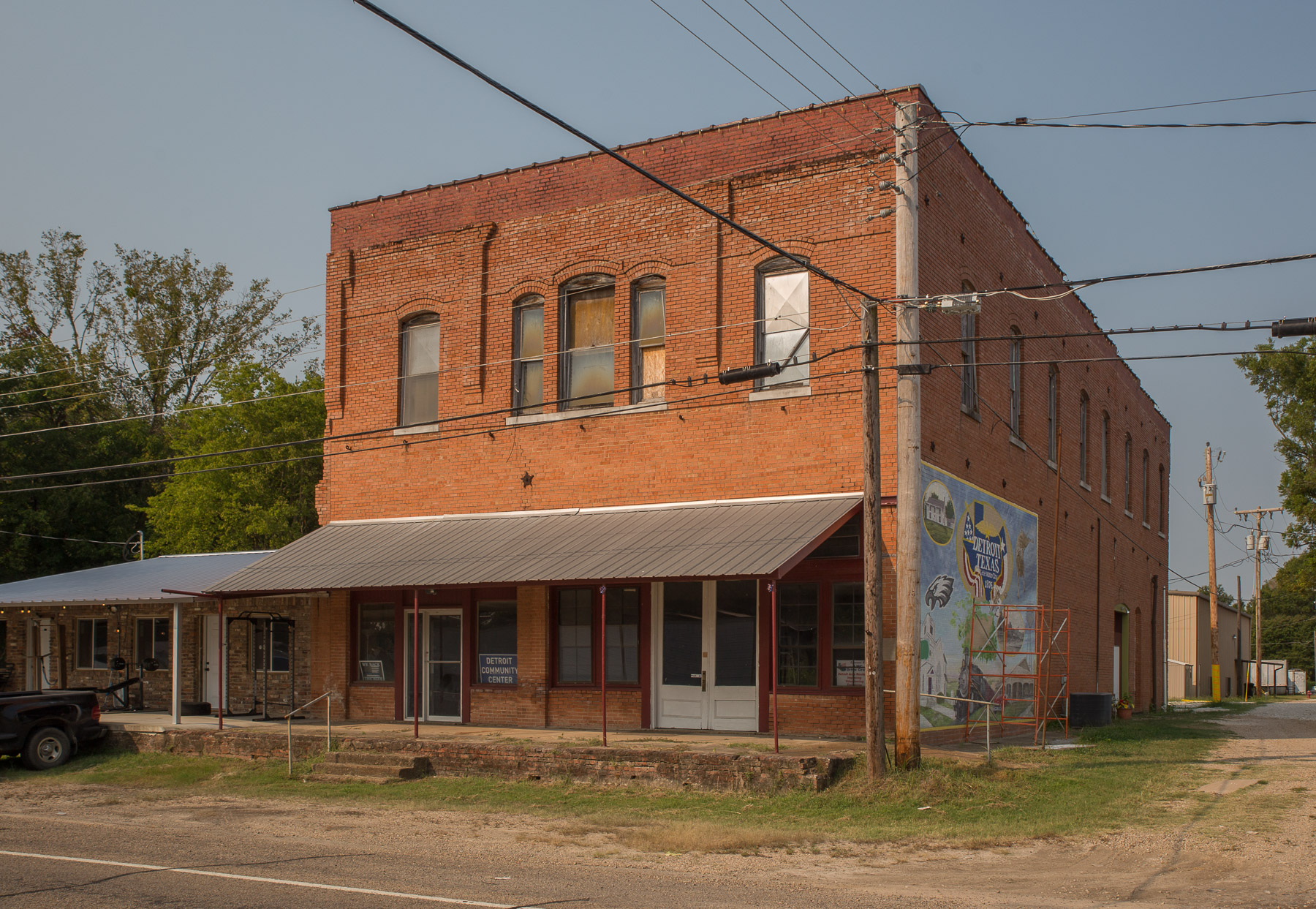
Old building

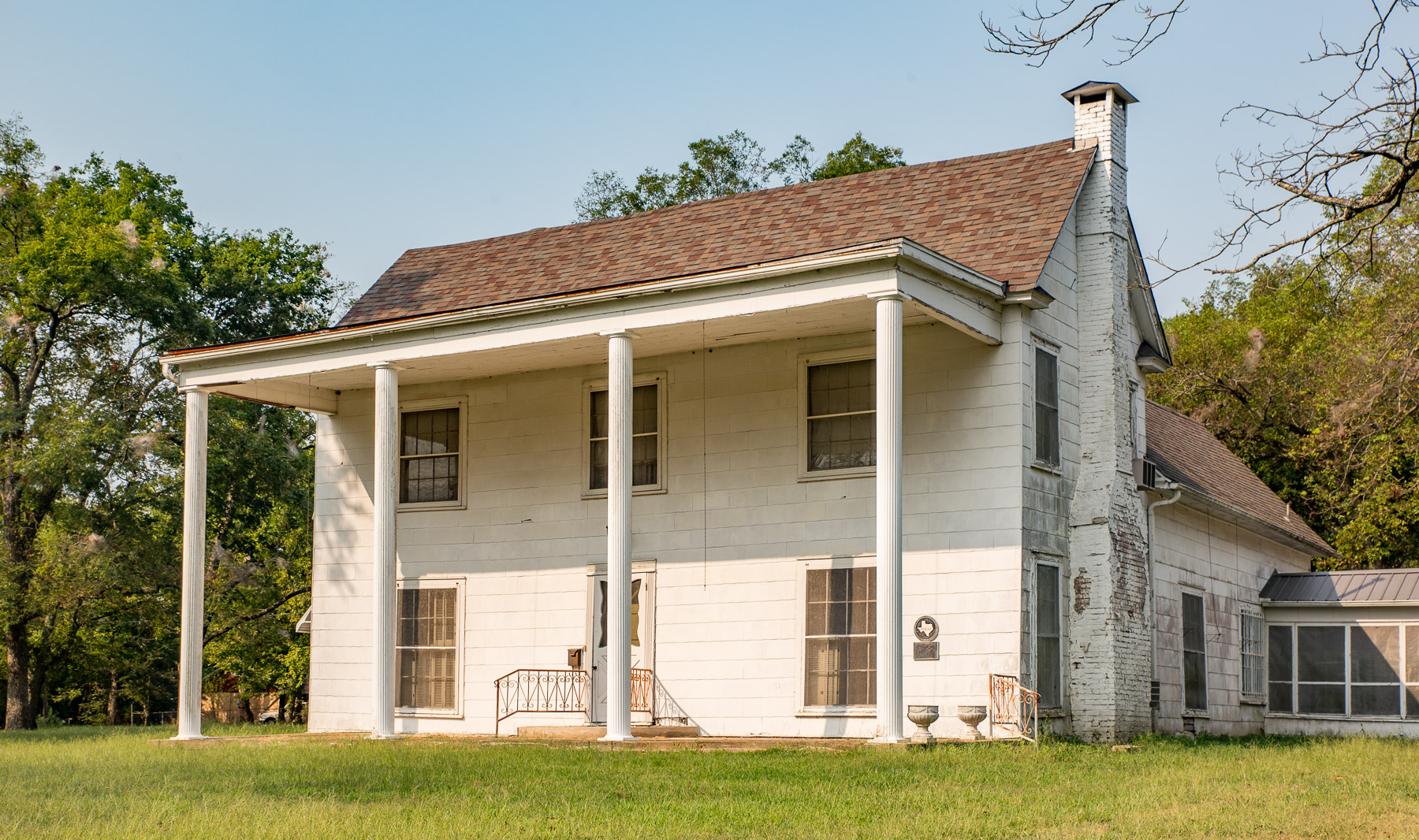
John Nance Garner House
