= Sulphur River =

River in Texas and Arkansas in the United States

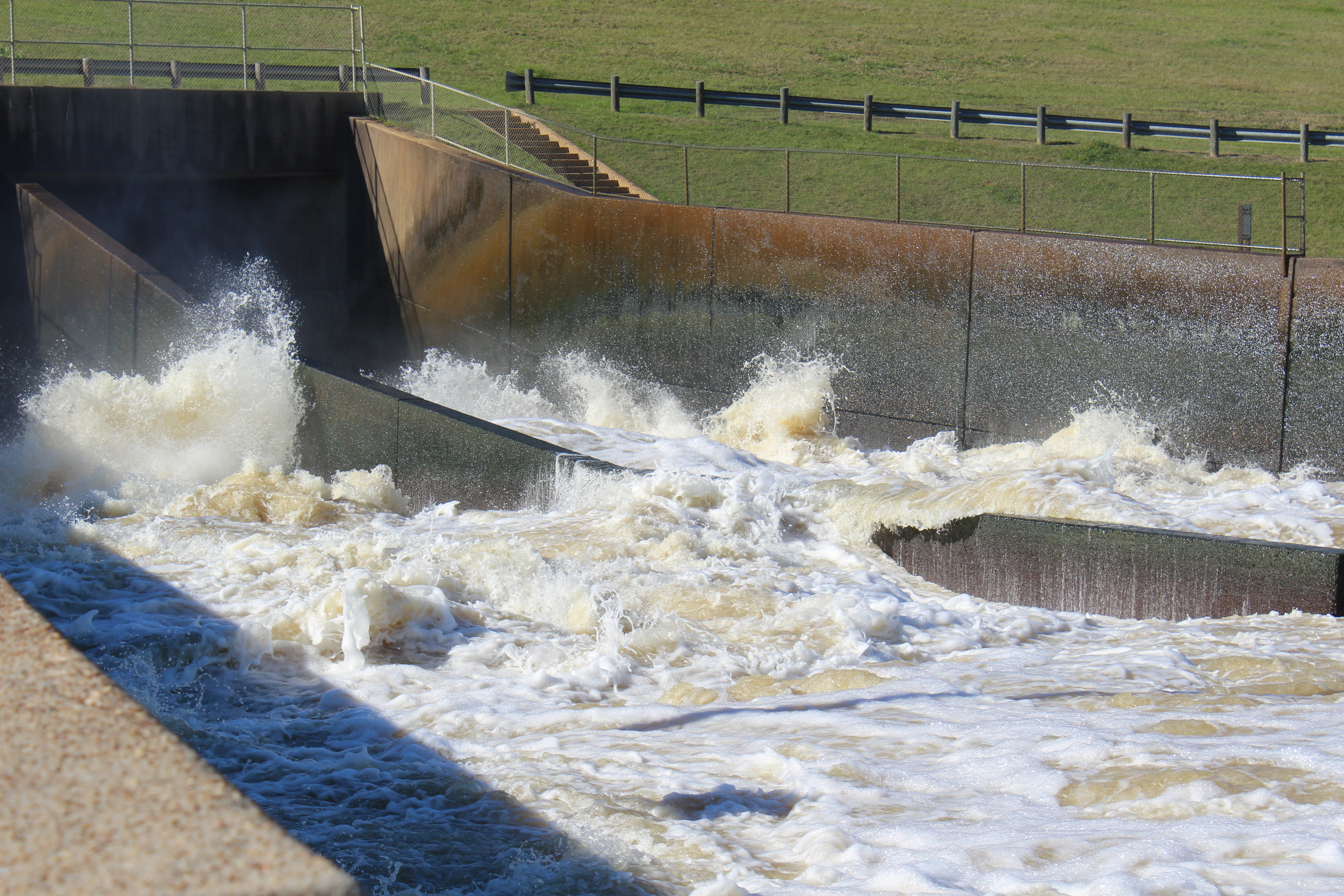

- Location of mouth

Location
- Country: United States
- States: Texas, Arkansas

Physical characteristics
- Source
  - location: Confluence of north and south forks at
  - coordinates: 33°23′36″N 95°21′20″W
  - elevation: 101 meters (331 ft)
- Mouth
  - location: Red River at
  - coordinates: 33°05′36″N 93°51′42″W
  - elevation: 58 meters (190 ft)
- Length: 175 miles (282 km)

The Sulphur River is a 175-mile-long (282 km) river in northeast Texas and southwest Arkansas in the United States. It is a tributary of the Red River.

== Geography ==
The Sulphur River begins at the confluence of its north and south forks forming (following earlier meanders) the northern and southern boundaries of, and meeting at the eastern end of, Delta County (Texas). This is about 4.7 miles (7.6 km) northeast of the town of Sulphur Bluff, 95 miles (153 km) northeast of Dallas, and 16 miles (26 km) downstream (air miles) along the south fork from the Cooper Lake dam.

The river flows generally eastward through several Texas counties. Tributaries include Shawnee Creek and Brevelle Lake. The river provides most of the water for Wright Patman Lake, on the border between Bowie and Cass counties. Below Wright Patman Dam, the river continues its generally eastward flow to the Arkansas state line. The river flows southeastward through Miller County in southwestern Arkansas for 15 miles (24 km) until it joins the southbound Red River east of Doddridge, a few miles north of the Louisiana border.

== Recreation ==
The Sulphur River provides numerous opportunities for fishing, boating, and other activities.

Above Wright Patman Lake, the river has enough water for recreation most of the time. The flow is slow, and the river is murky, largely due to channelization upstream. Below Wright Patman Dam, the river flow depends on the amount of water being released from the dam; however, water quality is usually good.

Wright Patman Lake provides additional opportunities for camping, boating, swimming, and fishing.

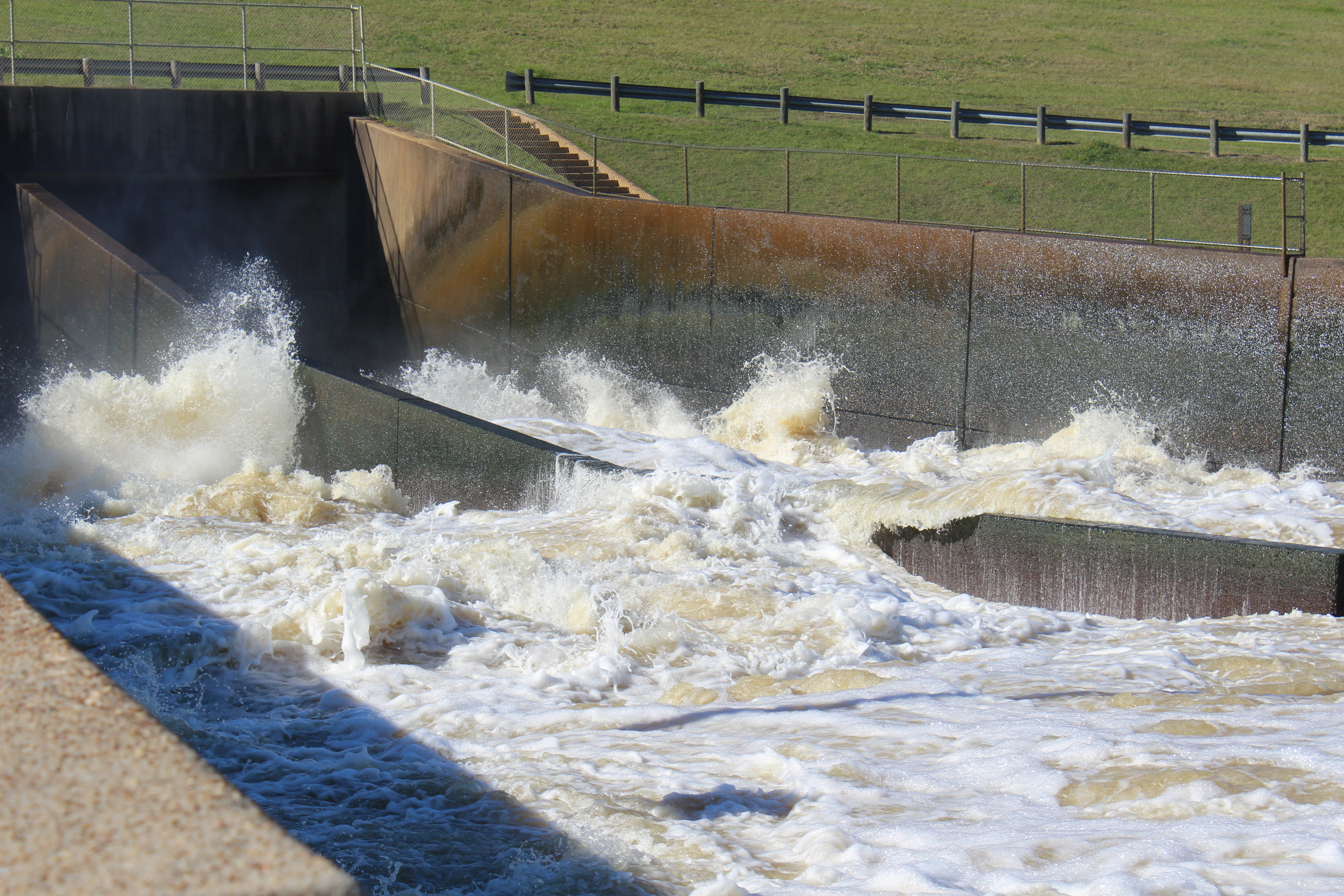
The spillway at Lake Wright Patman during the flood of 2015–2016. After this the Sulphur river flows into Miller County, Arkansas.

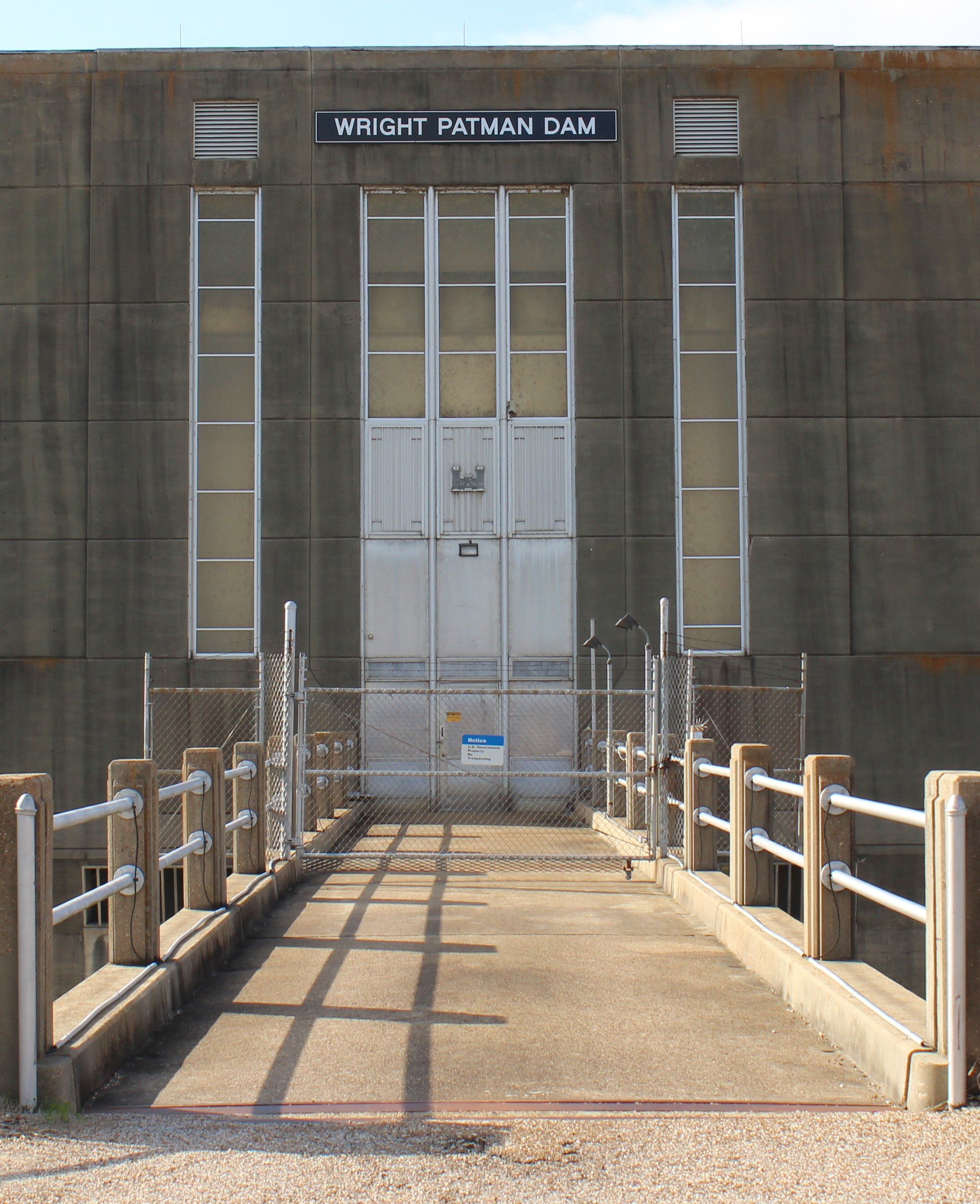
The control center for the Lake Wright Patman dam gates. After this the Sulphur river flows into Miller County, Arkansas.

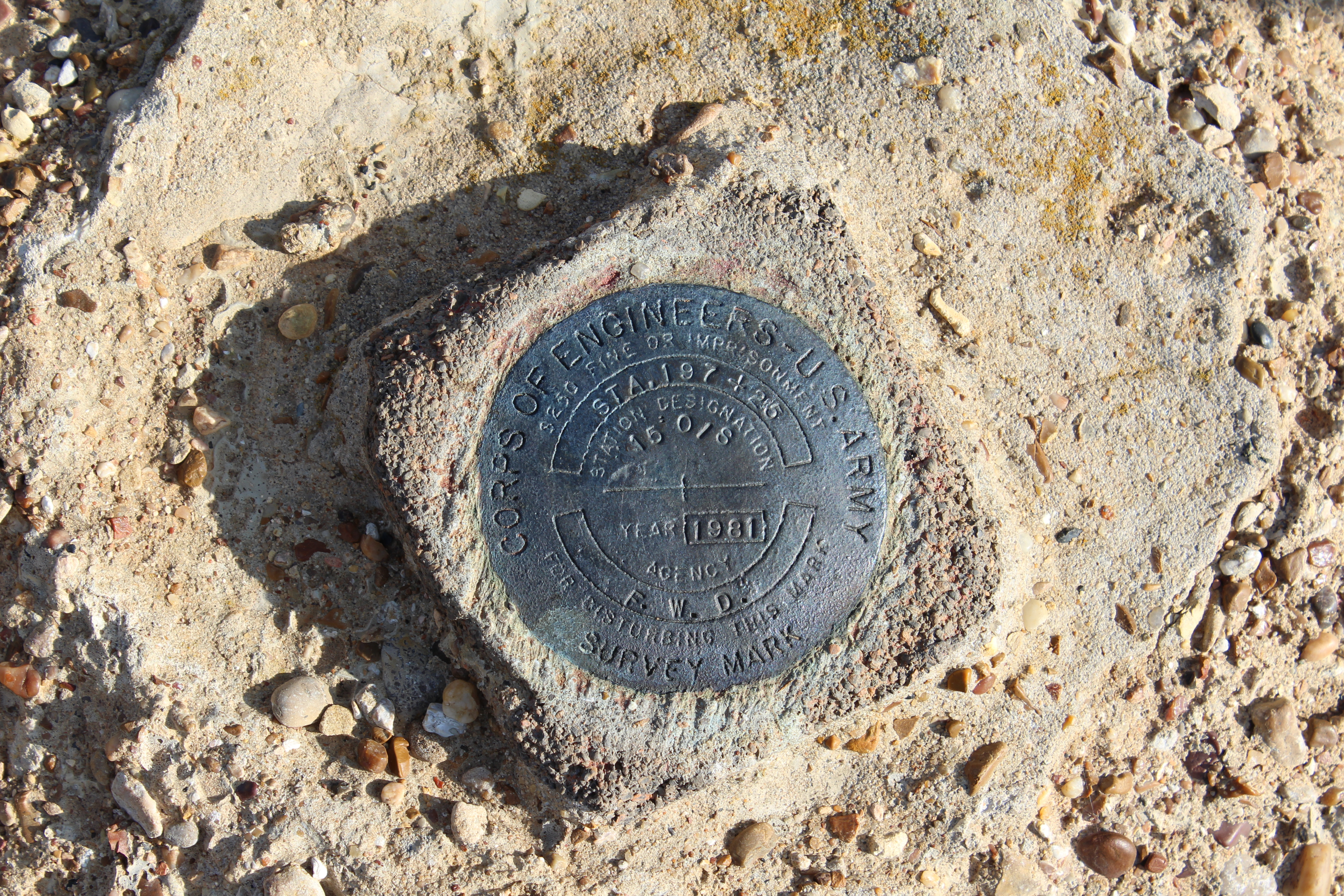
This is a brass survey marker for the Lake Wright Patman Dam installed in 1981 by the U.S. Army Corps of Engineers

== See also ==
- List of rivers of Texas
- Sulphur Springs, Texas
- Days Creek
- Brevelle Lake
