= Le Poste des Cadodaquious =

Coordinates: 33.5253°N 94.2443°W

Le Poste des Cadodaquious was a small French fort founded in 1719 northwest of Texarkana, Texas in today's Bowie County.
