= Roman Catholic Diocese of Memphis =

Latin Catholic jurisdiction in the United States

Coordinates: 35°07′03″N 89°58′16″W

Diocese of Memphis Dioecesis Memphitana
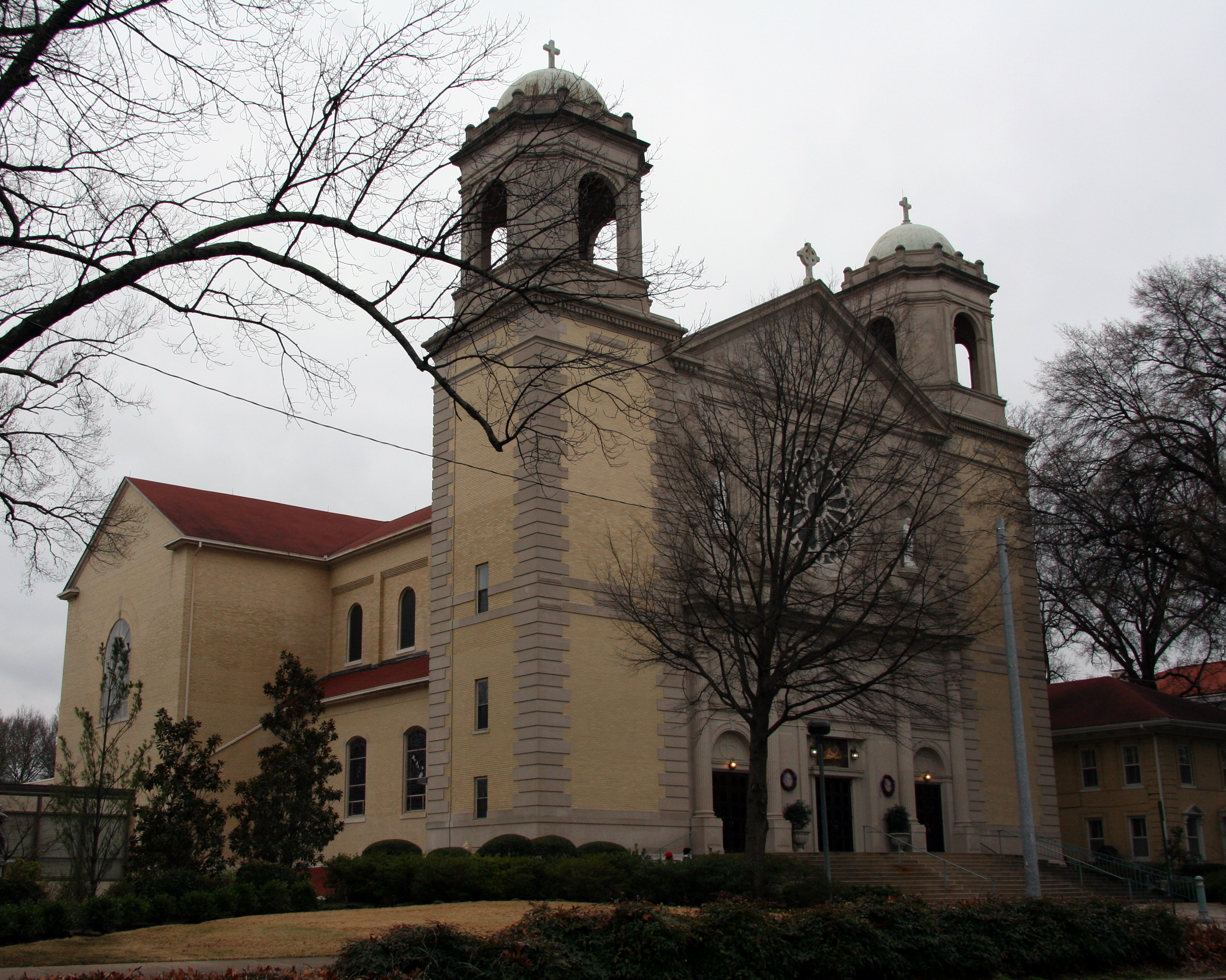
- Cathedral of the Immaculate Conception

- Coat of arms

Location
- Country: United States
- Territory: West Tennessee
- Ecclesiastical province: Louisville
- Population: 65,779 (4.5%)

Information
- Denomination: Catholic
- Sui iuris church: Latin Church
- Rite: Roman Rite
- Established: June 20, 1970
- Cathedral: Cathedral of the Immaculate Conception

Current leadership
- Pope: Leo XIV
- Bishop: Most Rev. David Talley
- Metropolitan Archbishop: Shelton Fabre
- Bishops emeritus: J. Terry Steib; Martin Holley

Map
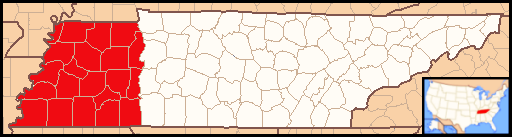

Website
- cdom.org

The Diocese of Memphis (Latin: Dioecesis Memphitana in Tennesia) is a diocese of the Catholic Church in the western part of Tennessee in the United States. The diocesan cathedral is the Cathedral of the Immaculate Conception in Memphis. The diocese is a suffragan diocese of the Archdiocese of Louisville in Kentucky.

== Statistics ==
The Diocese of Memphis consists of all the Tennessee counties that are west of the Tennessee River.

== History ==
=== 1800 to 1900 ===
In 1808, Pope Pius VII erected the Diocese of Bardstown, a huge diocese in the American South and Midwest. The new state of Tennessee was part of this diocese. Pope Gregory XVI erected the Diocese of Nashville in 1837, taking all of Tennessee from the Diocese of Bardstown.

The Memphis area and western Tennessee would remain part of the Diocese of Nashville for the next 133 years. In 1840, Bishop Richard Pius Miles of Nashville erected St. Peter Parish, the first in Memphis.St. Mary's Parish was established in Jackson around 1867, the first in that community.Miles in 1851 requested that the Dominican Sisters in Springfield send a contingent to Memphis to establish an orphanage. The sisters founded the first Catholic school in Memphis, St. Agnes Academy for girls.Today it is St. Agnes Academy-St. Dominic School. St. Peter's Orphanage in Memphis was started by the Dominicans in 1852.

The De La Salle Christian Brothers opened Christian Brothers College in Memphis in 1871. It is today Christian Brothers University.The Sisters of St. Francis in 1885 opened St. Joseph Hospital in Memphis. It later merged with Baptist Memorial Hospital-Memphis.

=== 1900 to 1980 ===
St. Ann Church, the first in Bartlett, was dedicated in 1952.Pope Paul VI erected the Diocese of Memphis on June 20, 1970, removing its present territory from the Diocese of Nashville and making it a suffragan of the Archdiocese of Louisville. The pope appointed Carroll Dozier of the Diocese of Richmond as the first bishop of Memphis.

During his tenure, Dozier implemented the reforms of the Second Vatican Council of the early 1960s. These included liturgical changes and more important roles for the laity in diocesan affairs. He also established the diocesan Housing Corporation, the local affiliate of Catholic Charities, the Ministry to the Sick, and a weekly newspaper called Common Sense.

In 1970, Dozier celebrated two masses of reconciliation in Memphis and Jackson for lapsed Catholics; he gave general absolution to those in attendance. Incarnation Parish was founded in Collierville in 1978.Dozier retired as bishop of Memphis in 1982.

=== 1980 to 2000 ===
In 1982, Pope John Paul II appointed Auxiliary Bishop James Stafford of the Archdiocese of Baltimore as the second bishop of Memphis. During his tenure, Stafford revised the structure of the Pastoral Office, improved the fiscal conditions of the diocese, and concentrated on the evangelization of African Americans. The pope named Stafford as archbishop of the Archdiocese of Denver in 1986.

The next bishop of Memphis was Daniel M. Buechlein of the Benedictine order, appointed by John Paul II in 1987. The pope named him archbishop of the Archdiocese of Indianapolis in 1992. To replace Buechlein in Memphis, John Paul II selected Auxiliary Bishop J. Terry Steib of the Archdiocese of St. Louis in 1993. One of Steib's primary accomplishments was the Jubiliee Program, reopening eight Catholic schools in Memphis that had been closed for financial reasons by a previous bishop.

=== 2010 to present ===
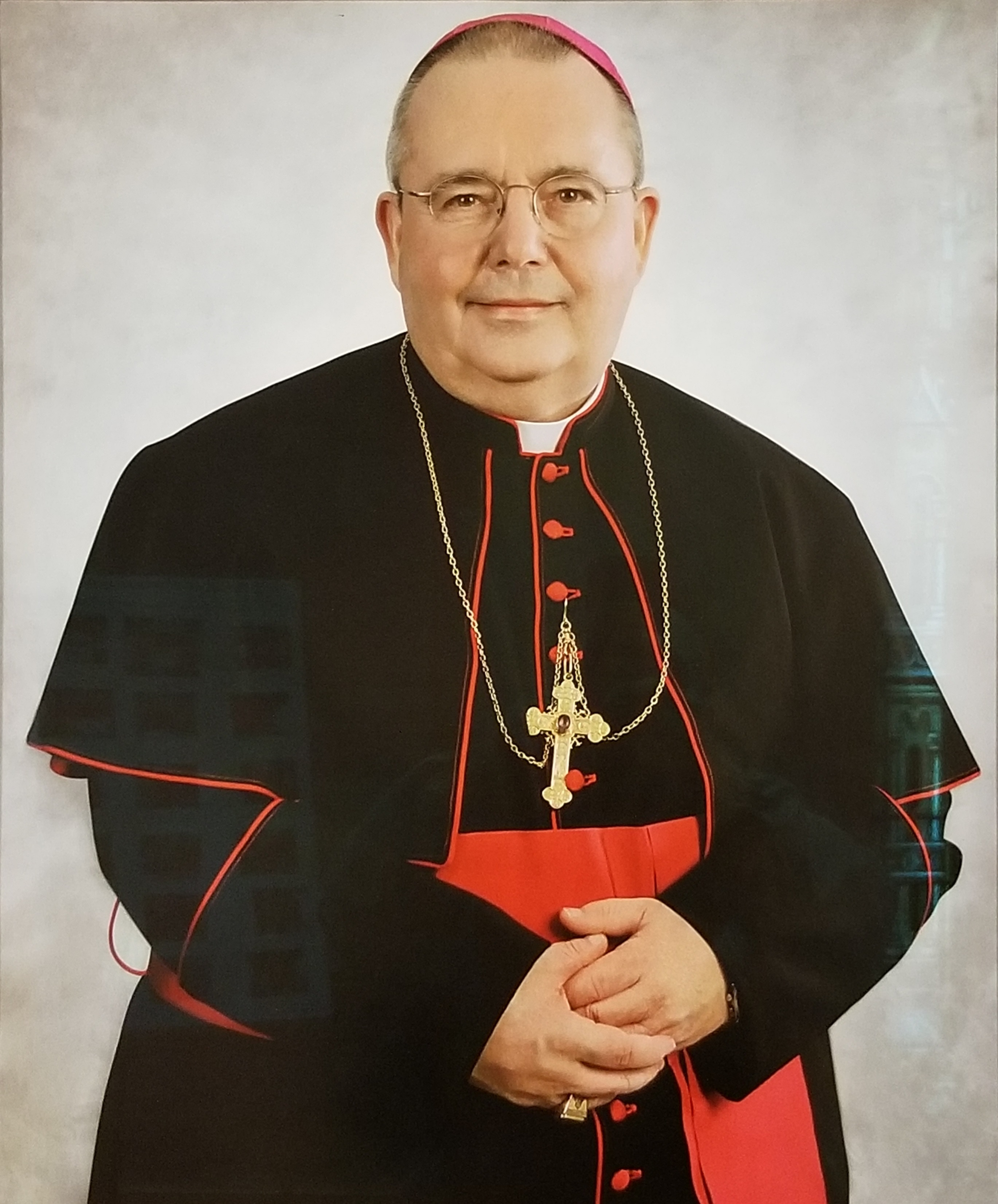
Bishop Talley (2019)

Steib retired as bishop of Memphis in 2016. Pope Francis named Auxiliary Bishop Martin Holley of the Archdiocese of Washington as the new bishop of Memphis on August 23, 2016. Soon after taking office, Holley transferred about 75% of the pastors in the diocese. He first requested their resignations and then rehired them with the title of "parochial administrator" rather than "pastor," allowing him to transfer priests without their resignations in the future.Holley also appointed a Canadian priest, Clement J. Machado, to three diocesan offices: vicar general, moderator of the curia and diocesan chancellor. (Note: Machado was asked to leave SOLT before he took these positions in the Memphis Diocese.)

In January 2018, citing lack of funds, the diocese announced the closure of the ten Jubilee schools. This action generated considerable dissent among the diocesan clergy.

In June 2018, the Vatican sent Archbishops Wilton Gregory of Atlanta and Bernard Hebda of St. Paul-Minneapolis to Memphis to conduct a visitation of the diocese to investigate complaints about Holley's leadership. The two archbishops met with several dozen priests. Soon after Gregory and Hebda returned to Rome, Machado resigned his positions. Holley assigned a different priest to each of the three offices Machado had held.

In October 2018, Pope Francis removed Holley as bishop of Memphis, citing concerns about his policy of reassigning priests. The pope named Archbishop Joseph Kurtz of Louisville as the temporary apostolic administrator of the diocese. The day after his removal, Holley told the Catholic News Agency that he believed he was removed from office as "revenge" for advising Pope Benedict XVI against appointing Cardinal Donald Wuerl, for the job of Vatican Secretary of State in 2012. Holley had previously served as auxiliary bishop in Washington under Wuerl. In March 2019, Francis appointed Bishop David Talley of the Diocese of Alexandria in Louisiana as the new bishop of Memphis.

Talley in July 2019 divided the parishes in the diocese into four deaneries to folster better cooperation among parishes and improve communication.The diocese in 2024 took possession of a small relic of St. Jude Thaddeus from St. Jude Children’s Research Hospital in Memphis. The relic was a bone chip of Thaddeus embedded in a small wooden cross. The hospital had stored the relic for several decades.

=== Reports of sexual abuse ===
In 2004, a Memphis man sued the Diocese of Memphis in a sexual abuse lawsuit. The plaintiff claimed that Juan Carlos Duran, a priest at the Church of the Ascension in Raleigh, had sexually abused him in 1999 when he was 14-years-old. Before coming to Memphis, Duran had been expelled from the Franciscan Order due to abuse allegations. The Dominican Order allowed him to join their order despite warnings from the Franciscans. After a diocesan investigation, Steib banned Duran from ministry and sent him to a center for treatment. Duran was permanently removed from ministry in 2004. In 2006, the diocese settled the case for $2 million.

The diocese was sued in September 2006 by a man who claimed to have been sexually abused by Daniel Dupree, a priest in Memphis, when the plaintiff was a teenager in the late 1980s. In 1992, Dupress left the priesthood. He admitted in a letter to diocesan officials to having abused 14 boys and young men. A court dismissed the suit in 2008, stating that the Tennessee statute of limitations for such crimes had passed. Dupree was laicized in 2006.

In 2010, unsealed court documents revealed that at least 15 Catholic clergy who served in the diocese were accused of committing acts of sex abuse and that the diocese had paid $2 million secretly paid to one victim.

In February 2019, the Diocese of Richmond released a list of priests with credible accusations of sexual abuse of minors. The list included Bishop Dozier, who had served in Richmond before being appointed bishop in Memphis. After his installation as bishop in March 2019, Bishop Talley ordered a comprehensive review of prior sexual abuse allegations involving the diocese, using an outside firm.In September 2019, the City of Memphis removed Dozier's image from the "Upstanders Mural" in downtown Memphis. In February 2020, the diocese released a list of 20 diocesan clergy who were credibly accused of sexually abusing children.

== Bishops ==
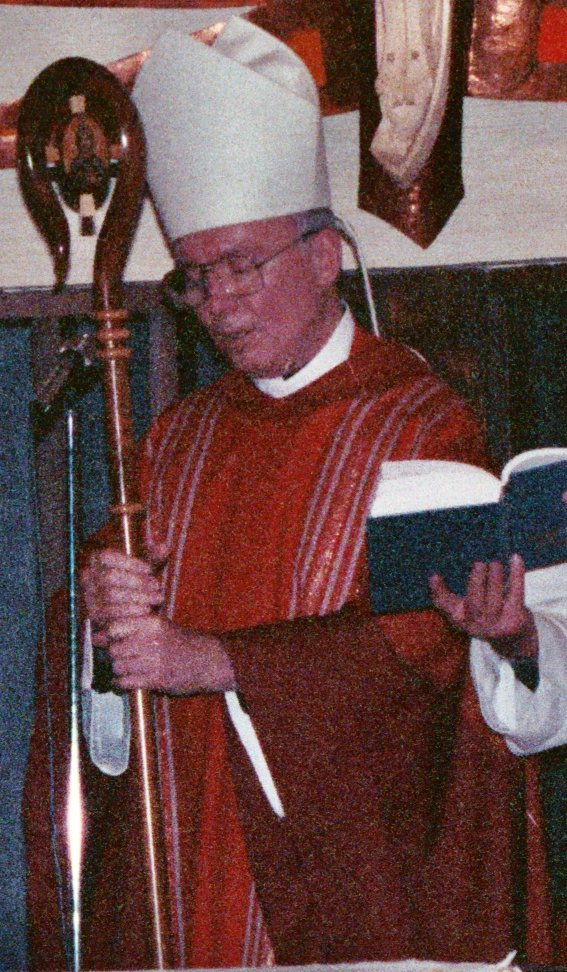
Cardinal Stafford

=== Bishops of Memphis ===
1. Carroll Thomas Dozier (1970–1982)
2. James Francis Stafford (1982–1986), appointed Archbishop of Denver and later President of the Pontifical Council for the Laity and Major Penitentiary of the Apostolic Penitentiary (elevated to Cardinal in 1998)
3. Daniel M. Buechlein (1987–1992), appointed Archbishop of Indianapolis
4. J. Terry Steib (1993–2016)
5. Martin David Holley (2016–2018)
  - Joseph Edward Kurtz, Archbishop of Louisville (apostolic administrator, 2018–2019)
6. David Talley (2019–present)

=== Other diocesan priests who became bishops ===
- Robert W. Marshall, appointed Bishop of Alexandria in Louisiana in 2020
- James Peter Sartain, appointed Bishop of Little Rock in 2000 and later Bishop of Joliet in Illinois and Archbishop of Seattle
- James P. Lyke, appointed as an auxiliary bishop of Cleveland in 1979 and Archbishop of Atlanta in 1991

== Education ==
Christian Brothers University, Memphis (2005)

As of 2026, the Diocese of Memphis has two pre-schools, three high schools and seven elementary schools.

=== High schools ===
- Christian Brothers High School – Memphis
- St. Agnes Academy-St. Dominic School – Memphis
- Saint Benedict at Auburndale – Cordova (Memphis)

=== Closed schools ===
- Bishop Byrne High School – Memphis
- Memphis Catholic High School – Memphis
- Immaculate Conception Cathedral School - Memphis

=== Higher education ===
Christian Brothers University – Memphis

== Arms ==
Coat of arms of Roman Catholic Diocese of Memphis
Notes This Coat of Arms was designed and adopted on the occasion of the installation of Bishop Martin David Holley. Adopted 2016 Escutcheon The arms of the diocese are composed of a red field with white and blue accents. The principal charge is a silver cross of a Coptic Christian style. Blue wavy bars are present on the upper division of the shield. The small mountains are present in the lower part. Symbolism The coat of arms of the Diocese of Memphis has a red field with six small hills in silver (white) at the bottom, from the arms of Pope Paul VI, who established the diocese. At the top of the shield, two wavy blue bands on a "chief" of silver represent the Mississippi and Tennessee rivers, the western and eastern (respectively) geographical borders of the diocese. A silver cross of the style used by Christians in the land of the Diocese's namesake city of Memphis in Egypt, links brothers and sisters in the faith of both regions to each other, and to the Church worldwide in the time of the new evangelization.
