= Cathedral of the Immaculate Conception (Memphis, Tennessee) =

Historic church in Tennessee, United States

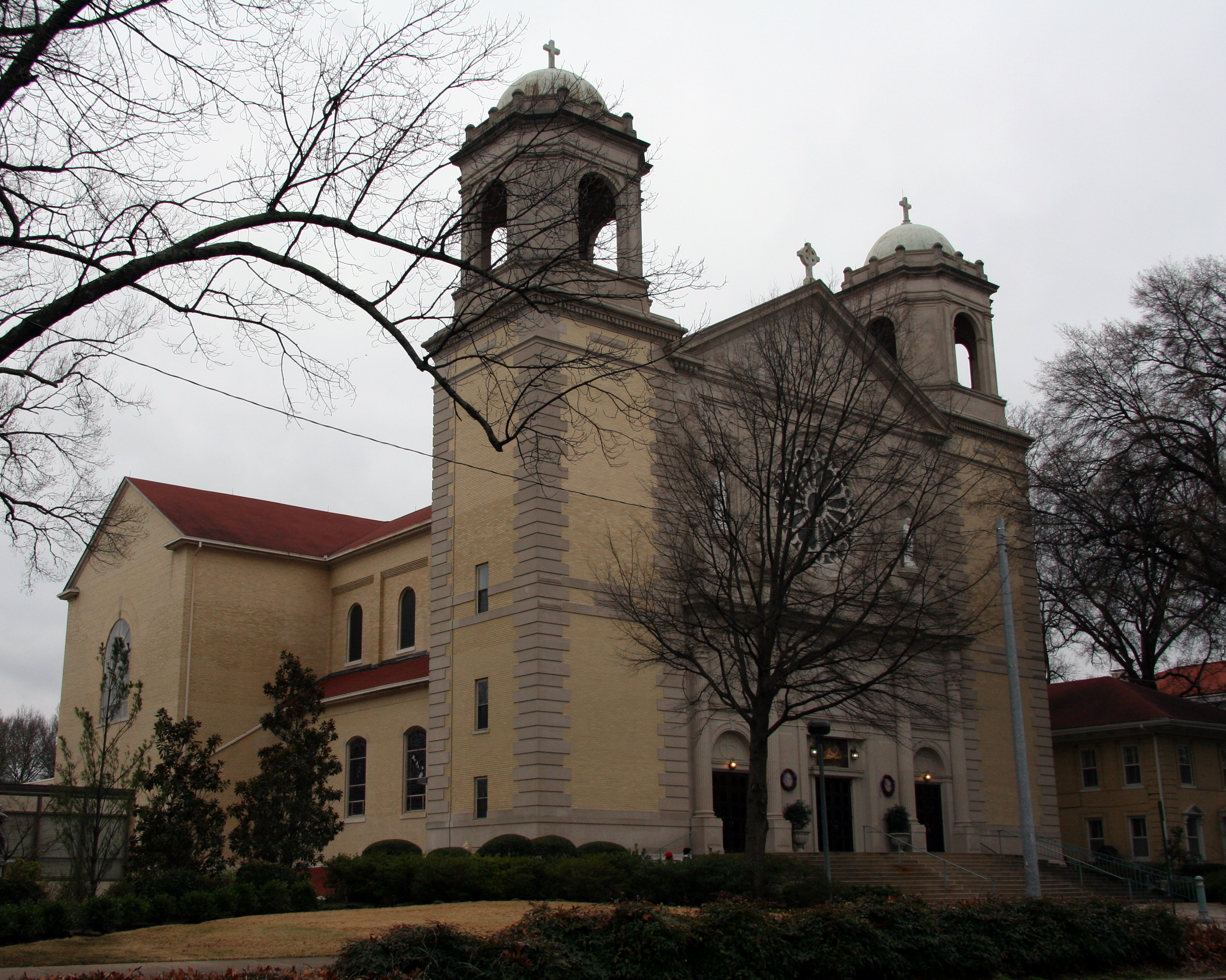

- Location in Tennessee
- 35°07′33″N 90°00′19″W
- Location: 1695 Central Ave. Memphis, Tennessee
- Country: United States
- Denomination: Roman Catholic Church
- Website: www.iccathedral.org

History
- Founded: 1921

Architecture
- Architect: Richard J. Regan
- Style: Spanish Colonial Revival
- Completed: 1938

Specifications
- Capacity: 1,200
- Length: 173 feet (53 m)
- Width: 106 feet (32 m)
- Materials: Brick

Administration
- Diocese: Memphis

Clergy
- Bishop: Most Rev. David Talley
- Rector: Very Rev. J. Keith Stewart, V.G.
- Vicar(s): Rev. Kacper Wojcieszko
- Immaculate Conception Cathedral, Rectory, School, and Convent
- U.S. Historic district – Contributing property
- Built: 1922 (rectory, convent, and school)
- Part of: Central Gardens Historic District (ID82004040)
- Designated CP: September 9, 1982

The Cathedral of the Immaculate Conception is a Catholic cathedral in Memphis, Tennessee, in the United States. It is the seat of the Diocese of Memphis.

The predecessor to the cathedral, Immaculate Conception Parish, was founded in 1921. A church and school building was built at that time. It was replaced by a larger church building in 1938. When the Diocese of Memphis was erected in 1971, Immaculate Conception Church became Immaculate Conception Cathedral.The cathedral underwent a major renovation in 2001.

== History ==
=== Immaculate Conception Parish ===
Immaculate Conception parish was established by Bishop Thomas Sebastian Byrne of the Diocese of Nashville in 1921. It was the ninth parish in Memphis. Monsignor Dennis J. Murphy was appointed as the parish's first pastor. He built a three-story brick building that served as a combination church and school. It continues to serve the parish today as its school building. The Sisters of Mercy provided the school's first faculty.

Construction of the present church building was begun in 1927. Richard J. Regan of Regan and Weller Architects was chosen to design the church. The lower crypt was initially built and used as the church for ten years before the upper church was built. The church was dedicated on July 31, 1938. The parish's second pastor, Monsignor Francis D. Grady, completed the decorative design work on the church's interior. Monsignor Merlin F. Kearney built the high school buildings east of the church during the 1950s and 1960s. Immaculate Conception High School for girls was also begun at this time.

=== Cathedral of the Immaculate Conception ===
Pope Paul VI established the Diocese of Memphis on January 6, 1971. Immaculate Conception was named as the new diocese's cathedral. The parish buildings are contributing properties in the Central Gardens Historic District, which was listed on the National Register of Historic Places in 1982. A major renovation of the cathedral was completed in 2001; the cathedral was rededicated by Bishop J. Terry Steib on December 8 of that year. In 2011, there were 800 families belonging to the parish and 430 students enrolled in the school.

== Architecture ==
The cathedral is a Spanish Colonial Revival style structure. It is cruciform in shape, and measures 173 by 106 feet (53 by 32 m). The steel structure is covered with buff brick trimmed with Indiana limestone. The main facade features three round arch entrance portals, a rose window, and a stone cross on the central pediment. Two towers flank the main facade. They are capped with copper covered domes surmounted with a cross; the domes reach a height of 115 feet (35 m). There are two other rose windows, one in each transept.

== See also ==
- List of Catholic cathedrals in the United States
- List of cathedrals in the United States
- Immaculate Conception Cathedral School
