= Ronald Paul Herzog =

American Roman Catholic prelate (1942–2019)

His Excellency, The Most Reverend Ronald Paul Herzog
- Bishop of Alexandria
- Archdiocese: New Orleans
- Diocese: Alexandria
- Appointed: November 4, 2004
- Installed: January 5, 2005
- Term ended: February 2, 2017
- Predecessor: Sam Jacobs
- Successor: David Talley

Orders
- Ordination: June 1, 1968
- Consecration: January 5, 2005 by Alfred Clifton Hughes, Thomas John Rodi, and Robert William Muench

Personal details
- Born: April 22, 1942 Akron, Ohio, US
- Died: April 12, 2019 (aged 76) Alexandria, Louisiana, US
- Education: St. Joseph Seminary; Pontifical College Josephinum
- Motto: One in the Lord

Styles of Ronald Paul Herzog
- Reference style: His Excellency; The Most Reverend
- Spoken style: Your Excellency
- Religious style: Bishop

Ronald Paul Herzog (April 22, 1942 – April 12, 2019) was an American prelate of the Roman Catholic Church, who served as Bishop of Alexandria in central Louisiana from 2005 to 2017.

== Biography ==
=== Early life ===
Paul Herzog was born on April 22, 1942, in Akron, Ohio. His parents were Lutheran and Catholic. Deciding toe become a priest, Herzog entered St. Joseph Seminary in Covington, Louisiana. He then attended the Pontifical College Josephinum in Worthington, Ohio.

=== Priesthood ===
Herzog was ordained to the priesthood at the Josephinum for the Diocese of Natchez-Jackson by Cardinal Amleto Giovanni Cicognani on June 1, 1968. After his ordination, the diocese assigned Herzog to pastoral work in its diocese.

In 1971, Pope Paul VI erected the Diocese of Biloxi, taking its territory from the Diocese of Natchez-Jackson. Herzog was then incardinated, or transferred, from Biloxi to the new diocese. His new diocese assigned him as pastor of Our Lady of Perpetual Help Parish in Lumberton, Mississippi, and the Saint Joseph Parish and Mission in Poplarville, Mississippi. Bishop Joseph Lawson Howze named Herzog as director of the diocesan Office of Liturgy from 1980. The Vatican elevated Herzog to the rank of monsignor in 1988. That same year, the diocese named him as pastor of Immaculate Conception Parish in Laurel, Mississippi. He also served as chaplain of the Mississippi National Guard, holding the rank of brigadier general.

=== Bishop of Alexandria in Louisiana ===
On November 4, 2004, Herzog was appointed bishop of Alexandria in Louisiana by Pope John Paul II. He received his episcopal consecration at St. Francis Xavier Cathedral in Alexandria, Louisiana, on January 5, 2005, from Archbishop Alfred Hughes, with Bishops Thomas Rodi and Robert Muench serving as co-consecrators. Herzog selected as his episcopal motto, "One In The Lord".

In 2013, Herzog released a statement regarding Reverend Frederick James Lyons, a retired priest. Lyons had been accused of sexually abusing minors during his early life as a priest. Herzog suspended Lyons from all priestly functions in 2006 and sent the case to Rome for examination. Lyons, in his late 80s at the time, was prohibited from acting as a priest, but not stripped of his priesthood. In his 2013 statement, Herzog asked for "your prayers for all who are affected by these accusations: victims, their families, our church and the accused."

Herzog served as the Catholic chair of the Anglican-Roman Catholic Consultation. Within the United States Conference of Catholic Bishops, he was a member of the Committee on Divine Worship, the Committee on National Collections, and the Subcommittee on Native American Catholics.

Herzog suffered a stroke in February 2014, with his left side affected. Herzog underwent extensive physical and occupation therapy, eventually submitting his resignation as bishop of Alexandria in Louisiana to the Vatican in 2016.On September 21, 2016, Pope Francis named David Talley, auxiliary bishop of Atlanta, as coadjutor bishop of Alexandria.

=== Retirement and death ===
Talley succeeded Herzog as bishop of Alexandria on February 2, 2017. Herzog died in Alexandria on April 12, 2019, at the age of 76 after a brief illness.

== See also ==
- Catholic Church hierarchy
- Catholic Church in the United States
- Historical list of the Catholic bishops of the United States
- List of Catholic bishops of the United States
- Lists of patriarchs, archbishops, and bishops

== Episcopal succession ==
Catholic Church titles
| Preceded by Sam Jacobs | Bishop of Alexandria; 2005–2017 | Succeeded by David Talley |
