= Robert W. Marshall =

Roman-catholic clergyman

His Excellency, The Most Reverend Robert W. Marshall
- Bishop of Alexandria
- Diocese: Alexandria
- Appointed: April 21, 2020
- Installed: August 20, 2020
- Predecessor: David Talley

Orders
- Ordination: June 10, 2000 by Terry Steib
- Consecration: August 20, 2020 by Gregory Michael Aymond, J. Terry Steib, and David Talley

Personal details
- Born: June 17, 1959 (age 67) Memphis, Tennessee, U.S.
- Education: Christian Brothers University; University of Memphis; Notre Dame Seminary
- Motto: Live Jesus in our hearts

Styles of Robert W. Marshall
- Reference style: His Excellency; The Most Reverend
- Spoken style: Your Excellency
- Religious style: Bishop

Robert William Marshall, Jr. (born June 17, 1959) is an American prelate of the Catholic Church who has been serving as Bishop of Alexandria in Louisiana since 2020.

== Biography ==
=== Early life ===
Robert Marshall was born on June 17, 1959, in Memphis, Tennessee. He attended Christian Brothers High School in Memphis, then went to Christian Brothers University in Memphis, receiving a Bachelor of Arts in history degree in 1980. In 1983, Marshall earned a Juris Doctor degree at the University of Memphis law school. He then practiced civil law for twelve years in St. Louis, Missouri, and Memphis.

Having decided to become a priest, Marshall entered Notre Dame Seminary in New Orleans in 1995 and completed his Master of Divinity degree in 2000.

=== Priesthood ===
Marshall was ordained a priest of the Diocese of Memphis on June 10, 2000, by Bishop Terry Steib at the Cathedral of the Immaculate Conception in Memphis. After his 2000 ordination, the diocese assigned Marshall to pastoral assignments in the following Tennessee parishes:

- parochial vicar at Incarnation in Collierville (2000 to 2002)
- pastor at Sacred Heart in Humboldt and St. Matthew in Milan (2002 to 2004)
- pastor at Ascension in Memphis (2004 to 2012)
- pastor at St. Francis of Assisi in Memphis (2012 to 2017)
- parochial administrator at the Cathedral of the Immaculate Conception in Memphis (2017 to 2020)

Marshall also served on the presbyteral council and the college of consultors. Marshall was the delegate of Archbishop Joseph Kurtz, who served as apostolic administrator of the diocese from October 2018 to April 2019. Marshall was appointed vicar general of the diocese in April 2019 by Bishop David P. Talley, the new bishop.

=== Bishop of Alexandria ===
Pope Francis appointed Marshall as bishop of the Diocese of Alexandria on April 21, 2020. He was consecrated by Archbishop Gregory Aymond on August 20, 2020, at St. Francis Xavier Cathedral in Alexandria. On September 15, 2026, Marshall was named apostolic administrator of the neighboring Diocese of Shreveport, while continuing to serve as Bishop of Alexandria.

== See also ==
- Catholic Church hierarchy
- Catholic Church in the United States
- Historical list of the Catholic bishops of the United States
- List of Catholic bishops of the United States
- Lists of patriarchs, archbishops, and bishops

Catholic Church titles
Preceded by David Talley	Bishop of Alexandria; 2020-Present	Succeeded by Incumbent
