= Immaculate Conception Cathedral School (Memphis, Tennessee) =

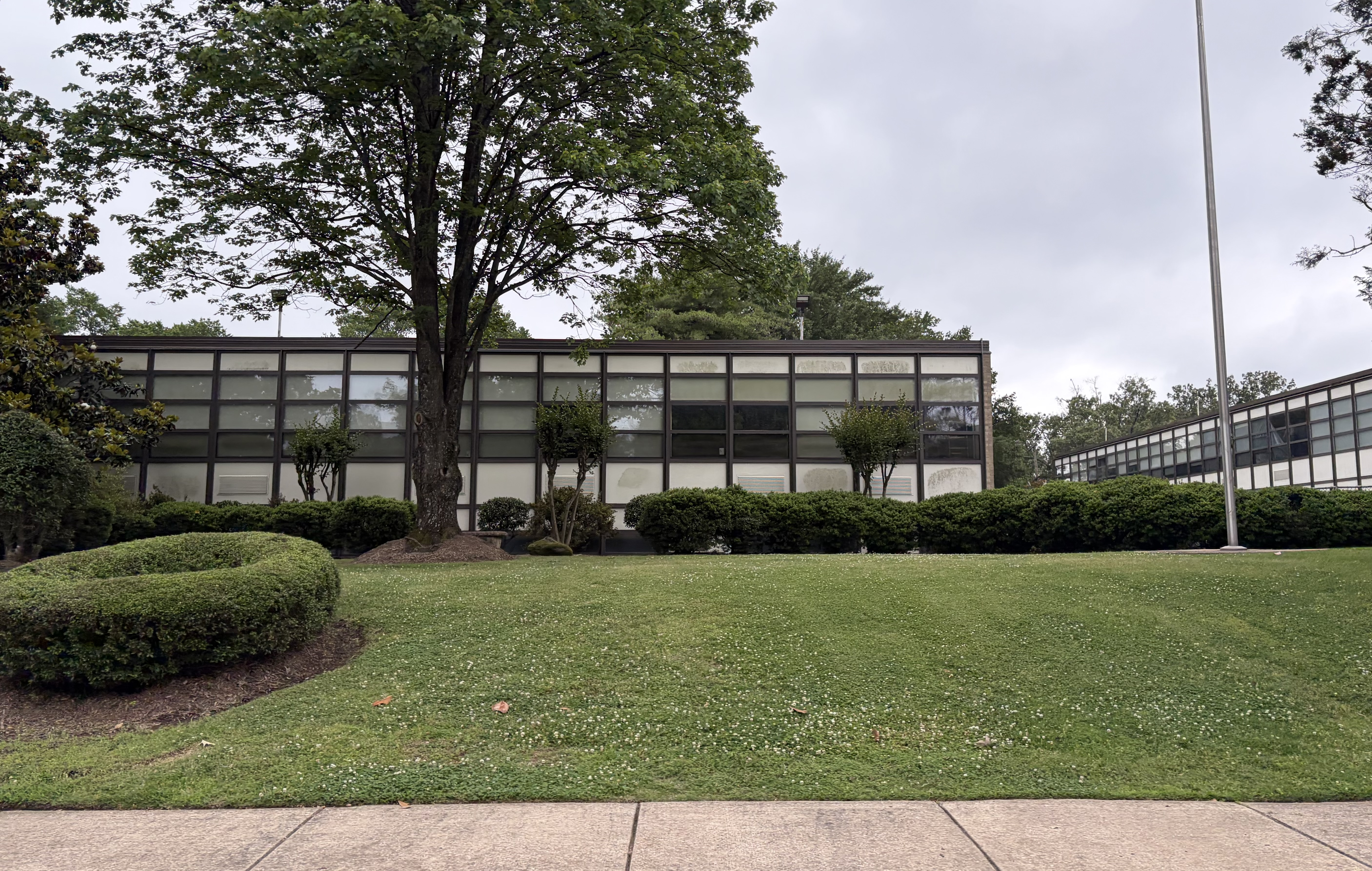
- The former school pictured in 2026

Location
- 1695 Central Avenue; Memphis, (Shelby County), Tennessee 38104; United States; 35°7′33″N 90°0′19″W

Information
- School type: Private, co-educational, Primary, Secondary
- Religious affiliation: Roman Catholic
- Established: 1921
- Closed: May 24, 2024
- Oversight: Roman Catholic Diocese of Memphis
- Superintendent: Janet Donato
- Principal: Kadesha Gordon
- Grades: Pre-K - 8th grade (coed),
- Colors: Blue and White
- Slogan: Serving, Educating, Uniting
- Nickname: "IC"
- Team name: Wildcats
- Accreditation: Southern Association of Colleges and Schools
- Publication: Steps
- Newspaper: Immaculata
- Yearbook: The Marian
- Alumni: Priscilla Presley, Margaret Scobey
- Website: http://www.myiccs.org

Immaculate Conception Cathedral School (ICSS) was a private Catholic school in the heart of the historic Central Gardens neighborhood of Memphis, Tennessee. ICCS was co-educational and served students of all faiths in its Pre-K3 through 8th grade. Its high school closed in 2020 and the remaining grades closed in 2024.

== Background ==
Founded in 1921 by the Sisters of Mercy, ICCS shared the campus of the Cathedral of the Immaculate Conception, the mother church of the Diocese of Memphis and was accredited by the Southern Association of Colleges and Schools as a unit school. Grades Pre-K through 8th were co-ed.

In August 2016, the school opened a new early childhood center that connects to the existing lower school building. The building also includes a library/media center and art room for all grades.

ICCS became only one of two schools in the Memphis area that incorporated "Mindfulness" into the Pre-K through high school curriculum. Intensive Spanish language instruction began in Pre-K and continued through high school. Students could have also choose French foreign language instruction in middle and high school. Other programs included STEM underwater and land-roving robotics teams, Orff music instruction, daily foreign language courses in all grades, and Accelerated Reader.

High school students had the opportunity to earn college credit through Christian Brothers University. For some science honors courses, high school students attended classes alongside college students at Christian Brothers University in the Cooper-Wilson Center for Life Sciences.

=== Closure of the school ===
On May 26, 2020, Immaculate Conception Cathedral School announced it would permanently close its high school due to the COVID-19 pandemic. The statement, released by then-pastor Robert W. Marshall Jr., said the pandemic caused financial difficulties that made it "impossible for the parish of the Cathedral of the Immaculate Conception to continue to operate the high school portion" of the school. Students had the opportunity to transfer to Saint Benedict at Auburndale, another diocesan high school.

The school's pre-K through 8th grade elementary and middle school remained open, but eventually closed on May 24, 2024.

== Notable alumni ==
- Priscilla Presley
- Margaret Scobey, former United States Ambassador to Egypt and Syria.
