= Holy Savior Menard Central High School =

High school in Louisiana, United States

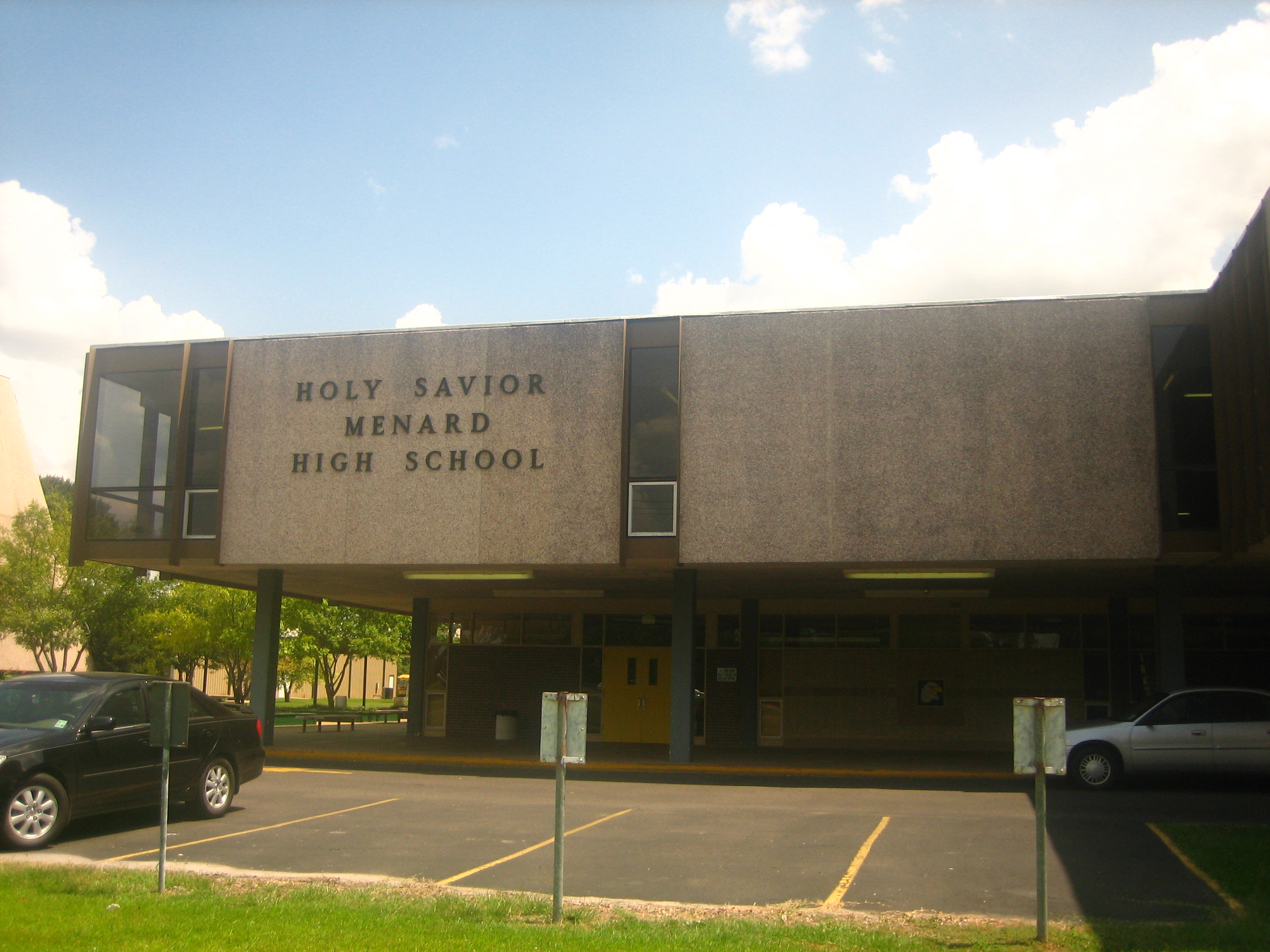
School

Holy Savior Menard Central High School is a Roman Catholic middle and high school in Alexandria, Louisiana. It is affiliated with the Diocese of Alexandria in Louisiana.

It was formed as a merger of Menard Memorial School, earlier known as St. Francis Xavier Commercial College; and Providence Central School, previously known as Providence Academy. In 1961 the creators of the school obtained the land. The consolidated school opened on August 30, 1967. It had a cost of $1,300,000. From the beginning, the school had boys and girls as students. The main building had two stories and had classrooms and management offices. There were separate buildings for a chapel and a gymnasium. 591 students were registered, and 29 people were a part of the faculty.

The school began teaching grades 7 and 8 in 1988; previously those grades attended Our Lady of Prompt Succor School. According to Bob Mahfouz, then the principal, this would allow 9th grade students to be eligible to play for varsity sports under the rules of Louisiana's school athletic association.

In 2015 the science laboratory was renovated.
