= Martin David Holley =

American bishop of the Catholic Church (born 1954)

His Excellency, The Most Reverend Martin David Holley
- Bishop Emeritus of Memphis
- Diocese: Memphis
- Appointed: August 23, 2016
- Installed: October 19, 2016
- Retired: October 24, 2018
- Predecessor: J. Terry Steib
- Successor: David Talley
- Previous post: Auxiliary Bishop of Washington and Titular Bishop of Rusibisir (2004-2016)

Orders
- Ordination: May 18, 1987 by Joseph Keith Symons
- Consecration: July 2, 2004 by Theodore Edgar McCarrick, John Ricard, and Leonard Olivier

Personal details
- Born: December 31, 1954 (age 71) Pensacola, Florida
- Education: Faulkner State Junior College; Alabama State University; The Catholic University of America; St. Vincent de Paul Regional Seminary
- Motto: In aeternum misericordia eius (His mercy endures forever)

Styles of Martin David Holley
- Reference style: His Excellency; The Most Reverend
- Spoken style: Your Excellency
- Religious style: Bishop

Martin David Holley (born December 31, 1954) is an American Catholic prelate who served as bishop of Memphis in Tennessee from 2016 to 2018, when he was removed by Pope Francis for alleged mismanagement. Holley previously served as an auxiliary bishop for the Archdiocese of Washington in the District of Columbia from 2004 to 2016.

== Biography ==
=== Early life and education ===
Martin Holley was born on December 31, 1954, in Pensacola, Florida. He graduated from Tate High School in Cantonment, Florida, in 1973. While at Tate, he was a basketball player and participant in student government. After high school, Holley entered Faulkner State Junior College, graduating in 1975 with an Associate of Arts degree in general studies. He then attended Alabama State University in Montgomery Alabama, graduating in 1977 with a Bachelor of Management degree.

Holley undertook postgraduate studies at the Theological College at The Catholic University of America in Washington, D.C. He then attended St. Vincent de Paul Regional Seminary in Boynton Beach, Florida, earning a Master of Divinity degree.

=== Priestly ministry ===
On May 8, 1987, Holley was ordained to the priesthood for the Diocese of Pensacola-Tallahassee by Bishop Joseph Symons at the Cathedral of the Sacred Heart in Pensacola, Florida. Holley served as associate pastor and administrator of St. Mary Catholic Parish in Fort Walton Beach, Florida, associate pastor of St. Paul Parish in Pensacola, and as administrator and pastor of Little Flower Parish in Pensacola.

Holley was a member of the diocesan council of priests, the spiritual director of the Serra Club of West Florida, the spiritual director and instructor for the permanent diaconate program, the director of the Department of Ethnic Concerns of the diocese, and a member of the Joint Conference of the National Black Catholic Clergy Caucus.

=== Auxiliary Bishop of Washington D.C. ===
On May 18, 2004, Pope John Paul II appointed Holley as titular bishop of Rusubisir and auxiliary bishop of the Archdiocese of Washington, D.C. He was consecrated by then Cardinal Theodore McCarrick on July 2, 2004.

In November 2014, Holley was elected by the United States Conference of Catholic Bishops (USCCB) to serve on the board of the Catholic Legal Immigration Network. Within the USCCB, he was a member of the Committee on Laity, Marriage, Family Life, and Youth; the Committee on Pro-Life Activities; the Subcommittee on Hispanic Affairs; and the National Collections Committee.

For 12 years, Holley served as auxiliary bishop and the vicar general for non-Hispanic ethnic ministries. He was a member of the Washington InterFaith Network, the International Foundation for the support of Deaf People, and Catholic Athletes for Christ. Holley also became a member of the archdiocesan College of Consultors, the Presbyteral Council, the Seminarian Review Board, Administrative Board, and as chairman of the College of Deans.

=== Bishop of Memphis ===
On August 23, 2016, Pope Francis named Holley as bishop of the Diocese of Memphis. He was installed on October 19, 2016.

A few months after his arrival in 2016, Holley asked for letters of resignation from all of his parish priests. He then reappointed all of them as "parochial administrators". This move allowed Holley to transfer certain priests to new parishes without their resignations from their existing parishes. Holley used this administrative maneuver to transfer approximately 75% of the pastors in the diocese. He never provided any reason for the transfers. Holley also appointed Clement J. Machado to the posts of vicar general, moderator of the curia and diocesan chancellor. In January 2018, citing lack of funds, the diocese announced the closure of the ten schools in its network of Memphis Jubilee Catholic Schools, founded in 1999 to serve children from poor families.

In June 2018, in response to complaints from the diocese, as well as a drop in parish donations, the Vatican sent Archbishops Wilton Gregory and Bernard Hebda on an apostolic visitation to Memphis for three days. During their visitation, the two archbishops met with several dozen priests. A few days after the visitation, Machado resigned all three of his positions in the diocese. The investigative results of the visitation were never released.

=== Removal and legacy ===
According to some reports, sometime in 2018 Pope Francis requested Holley's resignation as bishop, but Holley refused to resign. On October 24, 2018, the Vatican announced that Pope Francis had removed Holley as bishop of Memphis, citing his "management of the diocese." Francis named Archbishop Joseph Kurtz of Louisville as apostolic administrator to oversee the diocese until a new bishop was installed.

On October 25, 2018, Holley told the Catholic News Agency that the Vatican removed him as bishop due to a vendetta against him by Cardinal Donald Wuerl and Archbishop Christophe Pierre, the apostolic nuncio. According to Holley, he had advised Pope Benedict XVI in 2012 against appointing Wuerl as Vatican secretary of state, and Wuerl wanted revenge. Holley denied the allegations of sexual abuse and the findings of financial mismanagement. In response to Holley's claims, a spokesman for Wuerl said that the visitation resulted in Holley's ouster. On March 5, 2019, Francis appointed Bishop David Talley as the new bishop of Memphis.

Catholic Church titles
Preceded by J. Terry Steib	Bishop of Memphis; 2016–2018	Succeeded by David Talley
Preceded by -	Auxiliary Bishop of Washington; 2004–2016	Succeeded by -
