= St. Agnes Academy-St. Dominic School =

Location
- 4830 Walnut Grove Rd; Memphis, Tennessee, (Shelby County) 38117; United States; 35.1310°N 89.9014°W

Information
- School type: Independent, single-sex, primary, secondary, college-preparatory
- Motto: Veritas (Truth)
- Religious affiliations: Christianity, Dominican Order
- Denomination: Catholicism
- Patron saints: Agnes of Rome, St. Agnes; Dominic de Guzmán, St. Dominic
- Established: 1851, St. Agnes; 1956, St. Dominic
- Founder: 6 Dominican sisters
- Sister school: Christian Brothers High School
- Oversight: Dominican Sisters of Peace
- President: Thomas G. Hood
- Dean: Upper School: Heather Valdez, St. Agnes; Lower School and Junior High: Jennifer Wojick, St. Agnes; Jefferson Brant, St. Dominic
- Grades: PK2–12th, St. Agnes; PK2–8th, St. Dominic
- Gender: Female, St. Agnes; Male, St. Dominic
- Average class size: 18
- Colors: Blue and white , St. Agnes; Purple and gold , St. Dominic
- Slogan: St. Agnes: "A place where girls belong." "Girls with Grit"; St. Dominic: "A place where boys belong." "Where boys become Brothers" "Brotherhood begins here" "We belong where we can soar." (both)
- Song: "Family of Dominic"
- Fight song: St. Agnes: "Hail to thee, SAA"; St. Dominic: "The Wave War Hymn" by Pinky Wilson (Aggie War Hymn)
- Sports: Basketball, cheerleading, cross country, golf, football, soccer, softball, swimming, tennis, track and field volleyball, lacrosse, bowling, trap
- Mascot: "Aggie", St. Agnes "Sunny D", St. Dominic
- Nickname: St. Agnes: The Stars; St. Dominic: The Suns
- Accreditation: Southern Association of Colleges and Schools
- Publication: Calliope
- Yearbook: Aquila
- Feeder to: Itself, St. Agnes Christian Brothers High School, St. Dominic
- Website: www.saa-sds.org

St. Agnes Academy-St. Dominic School (SAA-SDS) is an independent, Catholic, Colocation community of schools in Memphis, Tennessee, United States, consisting of an all-girls PK2-12th school, and an all-boys PK2-8th school. The school is located in the Diocese of Memphis and follows Catholic principles, but is overseen by a board of trustees and the Dominican Sisters of Peace.

== History ==
St. Agnes Academy was founded by the Dominican Sisters in January 1851 and chartered in January 1852. The founding sisters were Magdalen Clark, Catherine McCormack, Vincentia Fitzpatrick, Ann Simpson Sr. Lucy Harper, and Emily Thorpe. Sisters Magdalen and Catherine were professed at St. Mary of the Springs, and the other four at St. Catharine, Kentucky. (The Dominican Sisters of St. Mary of the Springs and of St. Catharine, Kentucky, eventually merged, along with six other congregations, to become Dominican Sisters of Peace, the congregation that continues to sponsor the school today.) Sr. Catherine died in August, and Mother Angela Lynch replaced her with Sr. Frances Conlon.

St. Agnes was situated in what were then the suburbs of Memphis (Vance and Orleans), about a mile and a quarter from Court Square, the center of the city. The doors were opened on February 4, 1851, with 20 boarders and about 15-day students. When the school year ended on July 7, 1851, the enrollment had increased to more than 50, and an addition to the school had been completed. The Dominican Sisters also boarded orphans until 1864, when the sisters opened St. Peter's Orphanage.

In the fall of 1867 and again in the fall of 1873, Memphis was enveloped by the yellow fever epidemic. During these times, many Dominican Sisters died rendering service to the sick in Memphis. On May 16, 1878, after the yellow fever had faded, the academy caught fire and was reduced to ashes. Another fire in 1900 caused less damage. Neither fire, however, hindered the school's continued operation.

In 1911, two wings were added to the building to accommodate the growing enrollment, a Romanesque Chapel and an auditorium. The community purchased the Porter property on the right side of St. Agnes. On October 5, 1918, the faculty of St. Agnes established the Memphis Conservatory of Music where students could acquire a B.A. degree in music. It became the formal music education center of Memphis for beginning, advanced, and professional students. It was incorporated on August 4, 1923, and eventually formed the Department of Music at St. Agnes College.

In 1922 classes opened at St. Agnes College, the first Catholic women's college in the Diocese of Nashville and in the tri-states. It was the first college in Memphis to offer adult evening courses. It became evident that a separate location from the academy was needed if the college was to grow. To emphasize the distinction between the academy and the college, on January 1, 1939, the name of St. Agnes College was changed to Siena College. The college eventually moved to Poplar Avenue in 1953 and closed in 1972.

After 100 years at Vance and Orleans, St. Agnes Academy moved to its present site on Walnut Grove Road (Barbara Daush Blvd) in 1951. Ground was broken in 1956 for St. Dominic School, an elementary school for boys on the property with St. Agnes. A library/science portable building was added in 1974. A regulation soccer field and a quarter-mile running track were added in 1986.

The campus expanded over the years with the construction of Madonna Hall in 1966, the purchase of portable buildings in 1972, and the completion of an expanded and enhanced campus library in 1988. The Buckman/Davis Building was added to the campus in 1991 as the campus center for science and mathematics. Completing the Early Childhood Center and Tot Lot in 1998 accommodated the earliest grades. The opening of a multipurpose building, Siena Hall, in 1999 allowed the removal of all temporary structures and provided a pedestrian campus.

The "Reaching for the Stars and Suns" campaign created the Veritas Research Center, completed in 2008, which houses a Cybrary, Distance Learning Center, Multi-media Lab, Cyber Café, Senior Lounge, Tech Center, and eight classrooms. The school constructed a new Early Childhood Center in 2009. It is one of 18 schools in the country to be named an Apple Distinguished School.

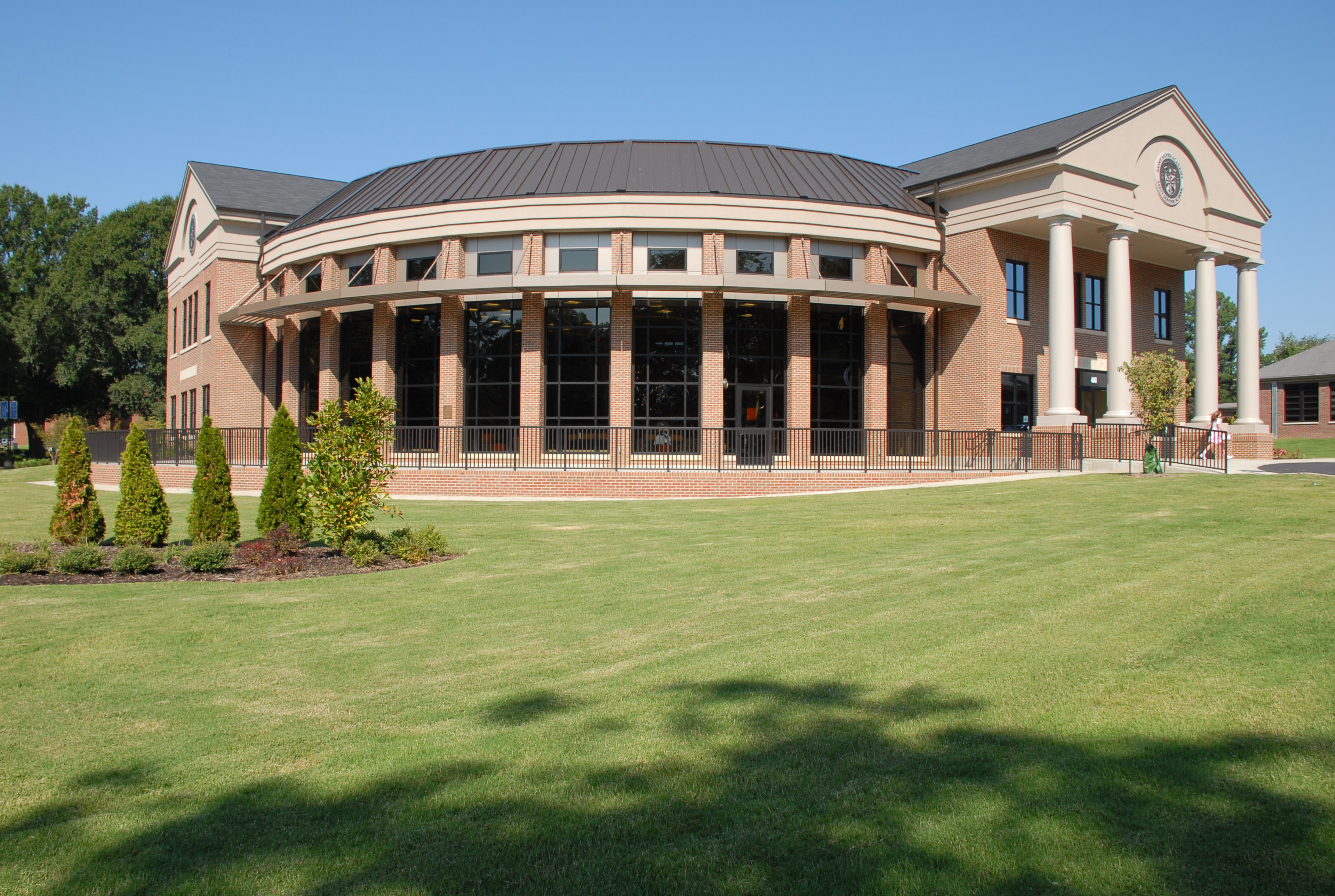
Veritas Research Center in 2008

As of 2013, the school was operated as one entity by a board of trustees consisting of parents, local leaders, and representatives of the Dominican Sisters of Peace.

On August 5, 2022, St. Agnes-St. Dominic launched the "Go Light the World" campaign which consists of building a new STEM facility to replace the Buckman/Davis building built back in 1991, and a new athletic complex that will consist of a gymnasium that will hold a maximum of 650 seated spectators. The new STEM facility was just recently completed while the new athletic complex still awaits construction and is expected to be finished by the conclusion of the 2024–2025 school year.

The present school offers coeducational early childhood and kindergarten education for boys and girls ages two through five, single-sex classes for girls and boys in grades kindergarten through six, coordinated junior high classes for boys and girls in grades seven and eight, and college preparatory education for girls from grades nine through twelve.

== Athletics ==
The Upper School is a member of TSSAA Division II Class AA West (Primary) and TISCA West (swimming).

The Lower School and Junior High are members of the Parochial Athletic Association, Shelby League, ESCRA, and MYA.

The Lower School, Junior High, and Upper School are members of TGLA (girls' lacrosse).

== Feeder schools ==
Feeder schools for the Upper School:

- St. Louis Catholic School, St. Agnes
- Holy Rosary Catholic School, St. Agnes
- Woodland Presbyterian School, St. Agnes
- Our Lady of Perpetual Help Catholic School, St. Agnes
- St. Ann Catholic School, St. Agnes
- Sacred Heart School, St. Agnes
- St. Paul Catholic School, St. Agnes
- Francis of Assisi Catholic School, St. Agnes

Feeder schools for the Junior High:

- Christ Methodist Day School, St. Agnes and St. Dominic

== Notable people ==
- Rachel Heck (2019), golfer
- Nellie O'Donnell (1867–1931)

== See also ==
- Siena College (Memphis, Tennessee)
- Christian Brothers High School (Memphis, Tennessee)
- Christian Brothers University
