= Christian Brothers High School (Memphis, Tennessee) =

Location
- 5900 Walnut Grove Road; Memphis, Tennessee 38120; United States; 35.130880°N 89.864290°W

Information
- Former name: Christian Brothers College High School (1871-1965)
- School type: Independent, single-sex, college-preparatory
- Motto: Virtus et Scientia (Latin) (Character and Knowledge)
- Religious affiliations: Christianity, De La Salle Brothers
- Denomination: Catholicism
- Patron saint: John Baptist de La Salle
- Established: 1871; 155 years ago
- Founder: Brother Maurelian Sheel
- Sister school: St. Agnes Academy-St. Dominic School
- Oversight: The Christian Brothers of the Midwest
- President: David Poos
- Principal: James Brummer
- Grades: 9–12
- Gender: Male
- Enrollment: 725 (2025-26)
- Campus size: 31.5 acres (127,000 m^{2})
- Campus type: Urban
- Colors: Purple and Gold
- Slogan: "Men for Tomorrow. Brothers for Life."
- Song: Bless This House
- Fight song: "Wave War Hymn" by Pinky Wilson, arr. by Patrick Bolton (Aggie War Hymn)
- Athletics conference: TSSAA Division II Class AA West (primary) Class AAA West (football); TISCA West (swimming); ATA/AIM, MSSA (trap) TRA, Western (rugby)
- Sports: Fall: cross country, football, golf, rugby Winter: basketball, bowling, swimming, wrestling Spring: baseball, lacrosse, rugby, soccer, tennis, track and field, trap and skeet
- Mascot: Wavey
- Nickname: The Brothers, The Purple Wave
- Rival: Memphis University School
- Accreditation: SACS, SAIS
- Publication: Purple & Gold
- Newspaper: The Maurelian
- Yearbook: Chronicle
- Tuition: $18,320 (2025-26)
- Affiliation: Christian Brothers University
- Website: www.cbhs.org

Christian Brothers High School (CBHS) is located in Memphis, Tennessee, United States, at 5900 Walnut Grove Road. It is a Catholic, all-boys, college-preparatory school with a Lasallian tradition.

== History ==
Christian Brothers College opened in November 1871 in a schoolhouse at 612 Adams Avenue in downtown Memphis that served students from elementary school through college. The school was founded by four brothers from the De La Salle Christian Brothers, a Christian teaching order, who moved to Memphis after some of the order's schools were destroyed by the Great Chicago Fire in October 1871.

In 1915, during the outbreak of World War I, Christian Brothers temporarily suspended their college-level classes because an overwhelming majority of that age-group had enlisted in the United States Armed Forces, although secondary education continued in the Christian Brothers High School. (The elementary school education was dropped in 1922.) High school enrollment grew in the 1920s and 1930s.

By 1940, Christian Brothers had outgrown the Adams facility and therefore relocated to a new campus at the intersection of East Parkway South and Central Avenue. The first building on the new campus, Kenrick Hall, was constructed in 1939-1940 to house the Christian Brothers High School and the College. Again, during the early 1940s with World War II, the school temporarily suspended college-level classes but continued with the high school curriculum.

In the years following World War II, high school enrollment rose because of the baby boom. Christian Brothers High School moved to a separate campus on Walnut Grove Road in Memphis and began to operate under a separate charter. The new CBHS campus opened in 1965 after four years of planning, fund raising, and construction. The college-level school (now Christian Brothers University) remained at the East Parkway campus.

In 1963, Christian Brothers accepted Jesse Turner, Jr., making CBHS the first racially integrated high school in Memphis, public or private. Turner graduated as co-salutatorian in 1967.

CBHS continues to occupy the 31.5 acre Walnut Grove campus, with significant expansion over the years.

== Feeder schools ==
Feeder schools include:

- St. Dominic School for Boys
- St. Louis Catholic School
- Holy Rosary Catholic School
- Woodland Presbyterian School
- Our Lady of Perpetual Help Catholic School
- St. Ann Catholic School
- Sacred Heart School
- St. Paul Catholic School
- Grace-St. Luke's Episcopal School
- St. Francis of Assisi Catholic School

== Notable alumni ==
- Pete Carney – musician
- Ray Crone – Major League Baseball (MLB) pitcher
- Zach Curlin – basketball and football coach for the University of Memphis
- Dominic Dierkes – actor, comedian, writer
- Paul Finebaum – sports journalist
- Logan Forsythe – MLB second baseman
- Phil Gagliano – MLB player
- Ralph Gagliano – MLB player
- Dallan Hayden – college football running back for the Memphis Tigers
- Paul Hofer – National Football League (NFL) running back
- Phil Irwin – MLB pitcher
- Mike Jankowski – skiing and snowboarding coach
- Bill Justis – recording artist, music producer, and film composer
- Patrick Kutas – college football guard for the Ole Miss Rebels
- Chuck Lanza – NFL player
- Nick Marable – folkstyle and freestyle wrestler, represented Team USA at the 2014 World Wrestling Championships
- Robert Marshall, Jr. – Bishop of Alexandria in Louisiana
- Tim McCarver – MLB player and sportscaster
- Shaun Micheel – professional golfer
- Cary Middlecoff – dentist and professional golfer
- Anthony Miller – NFL player
- Lawrence "Boo" Mitchell – musician
- Richard Mulrooney – professional soccer player
- John J. Shea, Jr. – ear surgeon
- Jim Strickland – politician, mayor of Memphis
- Jesse Winchester – musician, songwriter
- Will Brick - Minor League Baseball Player
