= Carroll Thomas Dozier =

American prelate of the Roman Catholic Church

His Excellency, The Most Reverend Carroll Thomas Dozier
- Bishop of Memphis
- See: Diocese of Memphis
- Appointed: November 12, 1970
- In office: January 6, 1971 to July 27, 1982
- Successor: James Stafford

Orders
- Ordination: March 19, 1937 by Francesco Marchetti Selvaggiani
- Consecration: January 6, 1971 by John Joseph Wright

Personal details
- Born: August 18, 1911 Richmond, Virginia, US
- Died: December 7, 1985 (aged 74) Memphis, Tennessee, US
- Parents: Curtis Merry and Rosa Ann (née Conaty) Dozier
- Education: College of the Holy Cross (AB); Pontifical Gregorian University (STB)
- Motto: In the beginning, God

Carroll Thomas Dozier (August 18, 1911—December 7, 1985) was an American prelate of the Catholic Church. He served as the first bishop of Memphis from 1971 to 1982.

In 2019, the Diocese of Richmond added Dozier to a list of clerics with credible accusations of sexual abuse of children.

== Biography ==
=== Early life ===
One of five children, Carroll Dozier was born on August 18, 1911, in Richmond, Virginia, to Curtis Merry and Rosa Ann (née Conaty) Dozier. After graduating from Benedictine High School in Richmond in 1928, he attended the College of the Holy Cross in Worcester, Massachusetts, obtaining a Bachelor of Arts degree in 1932. He then entered the Pontifical North American College and the Pontifical Gregorian University in Rome, earning a Bachelor of Sacred Theology degree

=== Priesthood ===
Dozier was ordained to the priesthood by Cardinal Francesco Marchetti Selvaggiani for the Diocese of Richmond in Rome on March 19, 1937. Following his return to Virginia in 1937, Dozier was assigned as a curate at St. Vincent's Parish in Newport News, Virginia. He was transferred in 1941 to St. Joseph's Parish in Petersburg, Virginia. Dozier was diocesan director of the Society for the Propagation of the Faith (1945–1953), then transferred to Sacred Heart Parish in Danville, Virginia. In 1954, he was appointed pastor of Christ the King Parish in Norfolk, Virginia. The Vatican elevated to the rank of papal chamberlain in 1954 and domestic prelate in 1961. He spent a brief time at St. Victoria Parish in Hurt, Virginia.

=== Bishop of Memphis ===
On November 12, 1970, Dozier was appointed the first bishop of the newly erected Diocese of Memphis by Pope Paul VI. He received his episcopal consecration at the Mid-South Coliseum in Memphis on January 6, 1971, from Cardinal John Wright, with Archbishops Luigi Raimondi and Thomas McDonough serving as co-consecrators.

During his tenure, Dozier implemented the reforms of the Second Vatican Council, including insisting on liturgical changes and giving more important roles to the laity in diocesan affairs. He also established the Diocesan Housing Corporation, Catholic Charities, Ministry to the Sick, and a weekly newspaper called Common Sense. A self-described "progressive," Dozier was an early opponent of American involvement in the Vietnam War and offered support to young men refusing the military draft. He also called for busing of students to achieve racial desegregation in public schools, opposed capital punishment, and supported ecumenism and women's rights. In 1970, Dozier celebrated two masses of reconciliation at Memphis and Jackson, Tennessee, for lapsed Catholics; he gave general absolution to those in attendance, to the dismay of Paul VI and Cardinal James Knox.

=== Retirement and legacy ===
On July 27, 1982, Pope John Paul II accepted Dozier's resignation as bishop of Memphis. Carroll Dozier died of a stroke in Memphis on December 7, 1985, at age 74.

On February 14, 2019, the Diocese of Richmond released a list of priests, including Dozier, who had been credibly accused of sexual abuse. On September 9, 2019, the city of Memphis removed his image from the "Upstanders Mural" across from the National Civil Rights Museum.

Catholic Church titles
Preceded by none	Bishop of Memphis; 1971—1982	Succeeded by James Stafford
