= St. Joseph School (Plaucheville, Louisiana) =

Private, coeducational school in Plaucheville, Louisiana

St. Joseph Elementary and High School

Location
- 3406 Highway 107 South; Plaucheville, (Avoyelles Parish), Louisiana 71362; United States; 30°57′53″N 91°59′1″W

Information
- Type: Private, Coeducational
- Religious affiliation: Roman Catholic
- Established: 1899/1920
- Principal: Billy Albritton
- Grades: K–12
- Colors: Navy blue and White
- Mascot: Eagle
- Nickname: Eagles
- Athletic Director: Kenny Knight
- Website: http://www.sjsplaucheville.org

St. Joseph Elementary and High School, in Plaucheville, Louisiana, is the only Catholic high school within the civil parish of Avoyelles. It is located in the Roman Catholic Diocese of Alexandria in Louisiana.

== History ==
In 1899, Father J.B. Limagne, Pastor of the Catholic Church in Plaucheville, petitioned Reverend Mother Florence, Superior General of the Sisters of Divine Providence, to send some sisters to his recently completed school. Three Sisters arrived in August and in September they opened the new school with ninety pupils. The school building was a two-story structure with four classrooms, a music room, and apartments for the Sisters. There were accommodations for boarders also.

Each successive Monday brought new students, and by Christmas, the teaching staff had increased to five. Because the teachers were obliged to teach in one room all at the same time, new accommodations had to be found. A hall containing two classrooms was built next to the church.

On Sunday, March 6, 1905, while the Sisters attended Mass, fire broke out at the school. Almost everything was destroyed. Father Limagne was determined that the Sisters remain. He offered his residence to them, and classes continued in the rectory and parish hall. Without delay, the Sisters purchased property for $275.00 on which the present St. Joseph High School was erected. A notation in the archives of the Congregation states, "the building was replaced at our expense amounting to $5,978.69."

Until 1908 the school offered only elementary grades; in 1920 the high school was established. The school was also changed from a pay school to a parochial school, operating on a tuition and procedure basis. In 1926, St. Joseph High School was established as a Louisiana High School by the Louisiana State Board of Education.

In May 1927, the Atchafalaya River overflowed the levee and flooded Plaucheville along with its surrounding areas. Hundreds of people fled their homes, among them the Sisters of St. Joseph, so the school term was cut short. After the flood, another building was added to the school, the present cafeteria and the senior classroom. This annex consisted of three large classrooms and a science department, used mainly for elementary classes.

The school withstood the depression years and in 1933-34 the enrollment soared to over three hundred students and eight teachers. In 1934 the state gave its approval for the elementary school. There was a possibility that the high school might have to close due to financial difficulties. However, the high school did not close and in September the enrollment was 260, with 57 high school students. Another teacher was needed, and Father Vernon Bordelon, the assistant pastor, volunteered to teach three periods every day. Father also sponsored and supervised the hot lunch program, conducted the physical education classes for the boys, and directed the Junior Boys' Choir which he had organized at the start of the school year.

In 1943 a new pastor, Reverend Alfred Fortin, came to Plaucheville. He began the construction of a new elementary building in 1945. The new school, a brick building, was located between the old elementary building and the school hall, now replaced by the new church. The science room and the classrooms of the old elementary school were converted into a modern lunchroom. In the summer months of 1946 the grammar school was remodeled and converted into a cafeteria at one end while the remainder was arranged as an assembly hall. It is still the same today except that the entire hall is now used as a cafeteria and is sometimes converted into an assembly hall for small gatherings.

The Golden Jubilee of St. Joseph School was celebrated on Easter Monday, March 26, 1951. The guest of honor was Monsignor J.V. Plauche, a native of Plaucheville, who received his elementary education at St. Joseph. The official blessing and groundbreaking for the school gym was begun at this time.

Monsignor Marcel Anderson arrived at St. Joseph in October, 1961. Under Monsignor's guidance, the existing buildings were remodeled to accommodate the school's changing requirements. Two classrooms in the gym were refinished. In addition, a typing room was added to the high school connecting the two existing buildings. In 1976, an extension to the cafeteria was added.

A new church, Mater Dolorosa, was erected for the parish in 1963. In 1967, a new rectory replaced the old one. Also in 1967, the Brothers of the Holy Eucharist, a local diocesan community, brought their apostolate to help staff the school. Brother Andre' M. Lucia, F.S.E., arrived first in March 1967. Brother Andre' became principal of the elementary school in 1980. In 1968, Brother Augustine Brian came to teach in the high school, followed by Brother Paul Casey, who taught religion to the lower grades. Eventually, the Brothers relocated their Motherhouse and formation center in Plaucheville.

The elementary library was completed in 1973. Steel buildings to house additional elementary classes were erected in 1978 and 1980. Since this time, elementary grades have been housed in individual classrooms. A centrally located science lab, used for large classes, was moved next to the elementary building. In 1995, St. Joseph established a Pre-Kindergarten with another metal unit to house it.

Father Tom Jezek followed Monsignor Anderson as pastor. Upon Father Tom's departure, Father Tony Cumella became pastor. After several years, Father Louis Voorhies became pastor of the church and St. Joseph School.

In 1985, Brother Andre' Lucia, F.S.E., replaced Sister Agnes Leonard Thevis of the Sisters of Divine Providence as principal of the school. In 2001, Brother Andre' was appointed President of St. Joseph School, when Brother Augustine Brian Kozdroj, F.S.E. replaced Brother Andre' as principal. Brother Paul Casey, F.S.E., continues to teach religion to the elementary grades. The Brothers of the Holy Eucharist have served St. Joseph for more than thirty years.

In 1993, The Marianites of Holy Cross sent Sister Joel Sperier to teach English, and religion in the high school department. Joining Sister Joel was Sister Mary David Hecker, who was the elementary religion teacher for the seventh and eighth grade, as well as the elementary librarian.

In 1995, Father Stephen Scott Chemino became pastor of Mater Dolorosa Church Parish and St. Joseph. He brought about many of the present day improvements to the school buildings and gymnasium. In 1997, Father John Andries joined Father Chemino, as Associate Pastor, followed by Father Marc Noel in 1998. Father Chemino taught religion to the senior and sophomore classes, while Father Marc instructed the juniors and freshmen. During the centennial year of St. Joseph, 1998, many special activities were held.

In 2016, Father Martin Laird became pastor Mater Dolorosa Church Parish and St. Joseph.

On October 1, 2016, Mr. Billy Albritton became principal of St. Joseph School.

In July 2017 we happily welcomed the Sisters of the Secular Institute of the Two Hearts to teach religion at the elementary and high school levels.

In addition to being one of the oldest Catholic Schools in the area, St. Joseph is the only Catholic High School within the civil parish of Avoyelles.

In 2023, Rhiannon Moreau became principal of St. Joseph School.

== Athletics ==
St. Joseph School athletics competes in the LHSAA.
