= Augustus Marie Martin =

French-born prelate (1803–1875)

His Excellency, The Right Reverend Augustus Marie Martin
- Bishop of Natchitoches
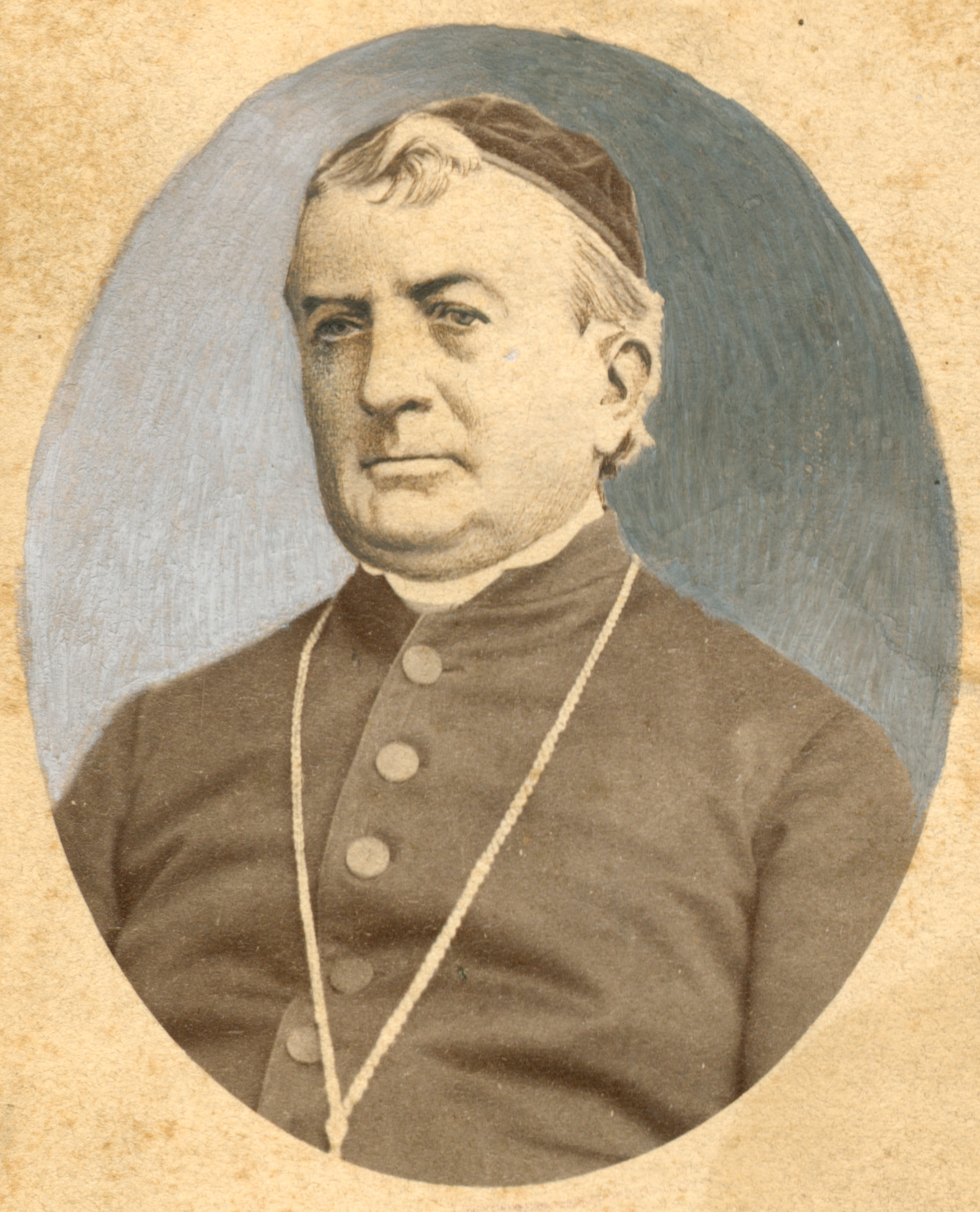
- Church: Roman Catholic Church
- See: Diocese of Natchitoches
- In office: November 30, 1853 – September 29, 1875
- Predecessor: none
- Successor: Francis Xavier Leray

Orders
- Ordination: May 31, 1828 by Claude-Louis de Lesquen
- Consecration: November 30, 1853 by Antoine Blanc

Personal details
- Born: February 1, 1803 Saint-Malo, Brittany, France
- Died: September 29, 1875 (aged 72) Natchitoches, Louisiana, US
- Motto: Spes mea (My hope)

Augustus Marie Martin (February 1, 1803 – September 29, 1875) was a French-born prelate of the Roman Catholic Church. He served as the first bishop of the Diocese of Natchitoches in Louisiana from 1853 until 1875.

== Biography ==
=== Early life ===
Martin was born February 1, 1803, in Saint-Malo, Brittany, in France. he studied under Reverend Jean-Marie de Lamennais at his school in Saint-Malo. As a seminarian, he was employed at the Grand Almonry of France, a office in Paris that was in charge of royal charities, Martin served under Cardinal Gustave Maximilien Juste de Croÿ-Solre.

=== Priesthood ===
Martin was ordained to the priesthood for the Diocese of Rennes in France on May 31, 1828, by Bishop Claude-Louis de Lesquen. After his ordination, the diocese assigned Martin as pastor of parishes in Bleurais and Vern-sur-Seiche, both in the Brittany region. He was later assigned as chaplain of the University of Rennes.

In 1839, while at the university, Martin in met Bishop Célestine Guynemer de la Hailandière, who had just been appointed by the Vatican as coadjutor bishop of the Diocese of Vincennes in the Midwestern United States. At that time, the diocese covered the entire State of Indiana and part of the State of Illinois. Trying to recruit priests and seminarians to come to the diocese, Hailandière persuaded Martin to join him.

After arriving in Indiana in 1839, the diocese appointed Martin as pastor of St. Vincent's Parish in Logansport, Indiana. He was later named pastor of the cathedral parish in Vincennes, Indiana. In 1843, Hailandière named Martin as his vicar general and put him in charge of the mission churches in Indiana. During this time, Martin became a confidant of Theodore Guerin, the founder of the Sisters of Providence of Saint Mary-of-the-Woods in the diocese since 1840. The two corresponded often, exchanging letters back and forth.

In 1846, Martin transferred from the Diocese of Vincennes to the Archdiocese of New Orleans, which then had jurisdiction over the entire State of Louisiana. The reason given was that Martin needed a milder climate for health reasons. However, the real reason was that Martin had grown tired of Hailandière 's micromanagement.

After arriving in Louisiana, the archdiocese appointed Martin as pastor at St. Martin's Parish at Attakapas. In 1847, he was transferred to St. Joseph's Parish in Baton Rouge, Louisiana. He later went to St. John's Parish at Plains, Louisiana, and St. Magdalen's Parish in Manchac, Louisiana, He went to St. Francis of Assisi Parish in Natchitoches, Louisiana, in 1849. Archbishop Antoine Blanc, named Martin as vicar forane of North Louisiana in 1850.

=== Bishop of Natchitoches ===
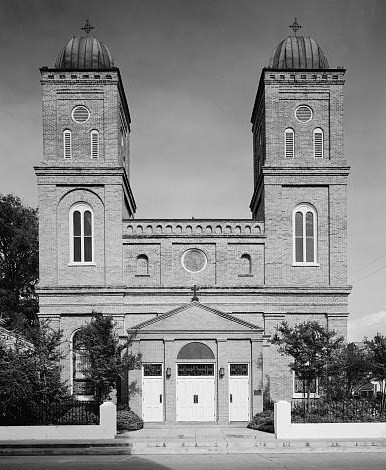
Basilica of the Immaculate Conception, Natchitoches, Louisiana (2008)

On July 29, 1853, Pope Pius IX erected the new Diocese of Natchitoches from the Archdiocese of New Orleans and appointed Martin as its first bishop . He received his episcopal consecration on November 30, 1853, from Blanc, with Bishops Michael Portier and James Oliver Van de Velde serving as co-consecrators, at the St. Louis Cathedral in New Orleans.

When Martin became bishop of Natchitoches, the diocese had only four priests to serve about 25,000 Catholics scattered over 22,000 square miles. One of his first acts was to return to Brittany to recruit seminarians. He told the men.

"We offer you no salary, no recompense, no holiday or pension. But, much hard work, a poor dwelling, few consolations, many disappointments, frequent sickness, a violent or lonely death, and unknown grave."

During his 22-year-long tenure, Martin established a seminary to train native clergy, founded numerous missions, and erected the Cathedral of the Immaculate Conception in Natchitoches. He attended the Second Plenary Council of Baltimore in Baltimore, Maryland in 1866 and the First Vatican Council in Rome in 1869. Five of the priests who came to Natchitoches with Martin from Brittany in 1853 died of yellow fever during a 1873 epidemic in Shreveport, Louisiana.

=== Death ===
Augustus Martin died in Natchitoches on September 29, 1875, at age 72. He is buried at the Basilica of the Immaculate Conception.

Catholic Church titles
Preceded by none	Bishop of Natchitoches; 1853–1875	Succeeded by Francis Xavier Leray
