= St. Francis Xavier Cathedral (Alexandria, Louisiana) =

Historic church in Louisiana, United States

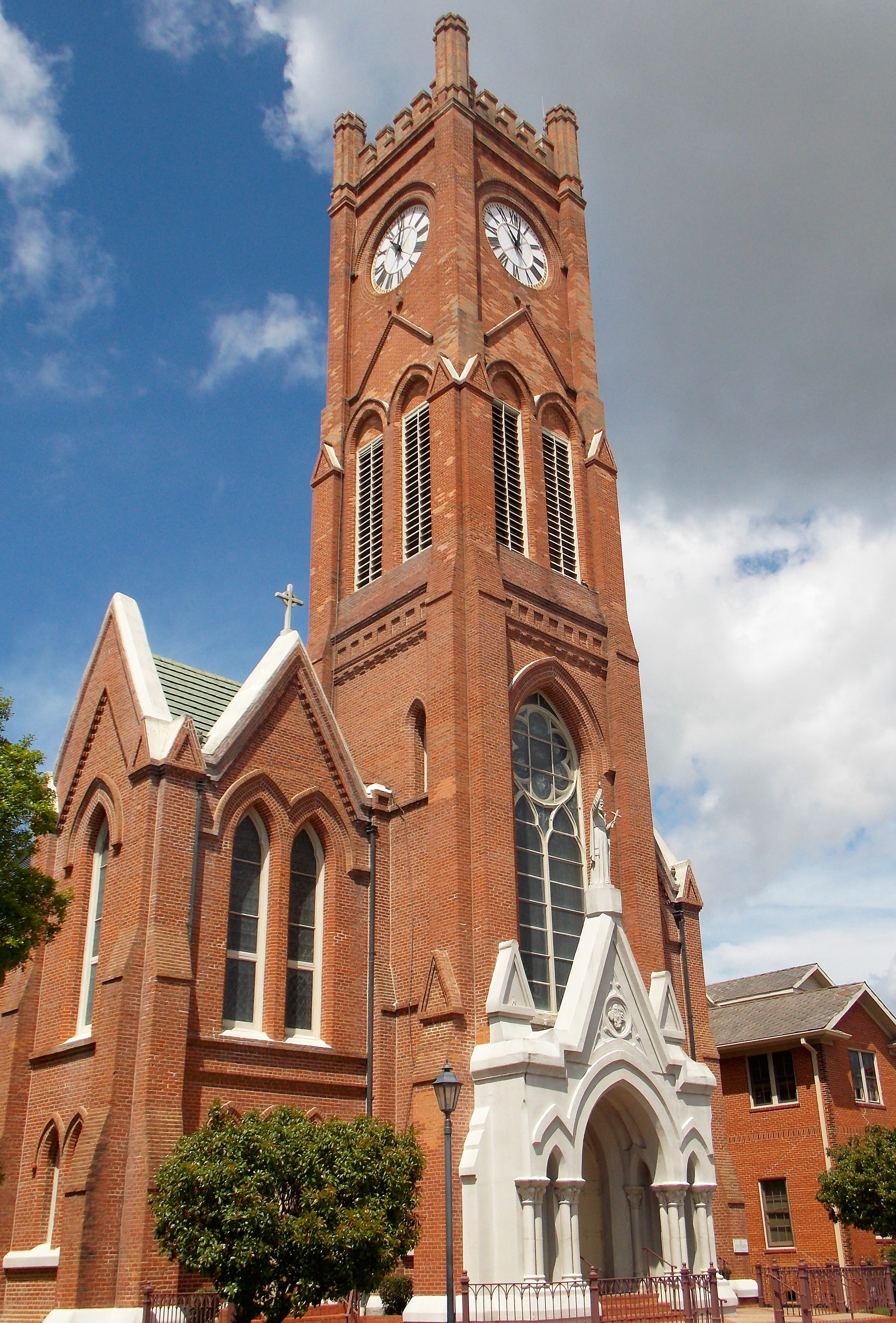
- St. Francis Xavier Cathedral in 2014

- Location within Louisiana
- 31°18′44.3″N 92°26′52.1″W
- Location: 626 Fourth St. Alexandria, Louisiana
- Country: United States
- Denomination: Roman Catholic Church
- Website: www.sfxcathedral.org

History
- Founded: 1834
- Consecrated: 30 November 1899

Architecture
- Architect: Nicholas J. Clayton
- Style: Late Gothic Revival; Beaux Arts; Bungalow
- Groundbreaking: 1895
- Completed: 1899

Specifications
- Materials: Brick, pine

Administration
- Diocese: Alexandria in Louisiana

Clergy
- Bishop: Most Rev. Robert W. Marshall
- Rector: Rev. James A. Ferguson
- Vicar: Rev. Bob Garrione
- St. Francis Xavier Cathedral Complex
- U.S. National Register of Historic Places
- Area: 2 acres (0.81 ha)
- NRHP reference No.: 84001353
- Added to NRHP: 29 March 1984

St. Francis Xavier Cathedral is the cathedral church of the Roman Catholic Diocese of Alexandria, located in Alexandria, Louisiana.

The cathedral and related buildings was added to the National Register of Historic Places on 29 March 1984 as St. Francis Xavier Cathedral Complex. The complex includes the cathedral building, St. Francis Academy (erected in 1897), and the rectory (erected in 1896 and renovated in 1930).

== History ==
The old parish church of Saint Francis was constructed in 1817. It was the only building in Alexandria spared during the American Civil War. As the Union army pulled out of the town during the disastrous Red River Campaign, Father J. P. Bellier disguised his voice to impersonate that of General Nathaniel Banks, the Union commanding officer, and ordered the troops to spare the church. His plan succeeded and the building was saved.

The old building burned down in 1895. Efforts to rebuild a church started immediately. The foundation stone was laid down on 3 December 1895. Designed in Gothic Revival style by Nicholas J. Clayton, the new church was dedicated on 30 November 1899, the first brick church in the city. In 1907, a belfry was added, and the clock was installed in 1908.

Because of the newly constructed church and Alexandria's central location, Bishop Cornelius Van de Ven petitioned the Roman Curia to transfer the seat of the diocese from Natchitoches to Alexandria. Pope Pius X granted this wish, changing the title to Diocese of Alexandria on 6 August 1910 and designating St. Francis Xavier Church as the cathedral of the newly created diocese.

The current bishop of Alexandria is the Most Reverend Robert W. Marshall Jr., and the rector of the cathedral is Father James A. Ferguson.

== Interior ==
The cathedral's rose windows are the largest in the state. The cathedral boasts a 3-manual, 48-rank Reuterpipe organ inaugurated in 2004.

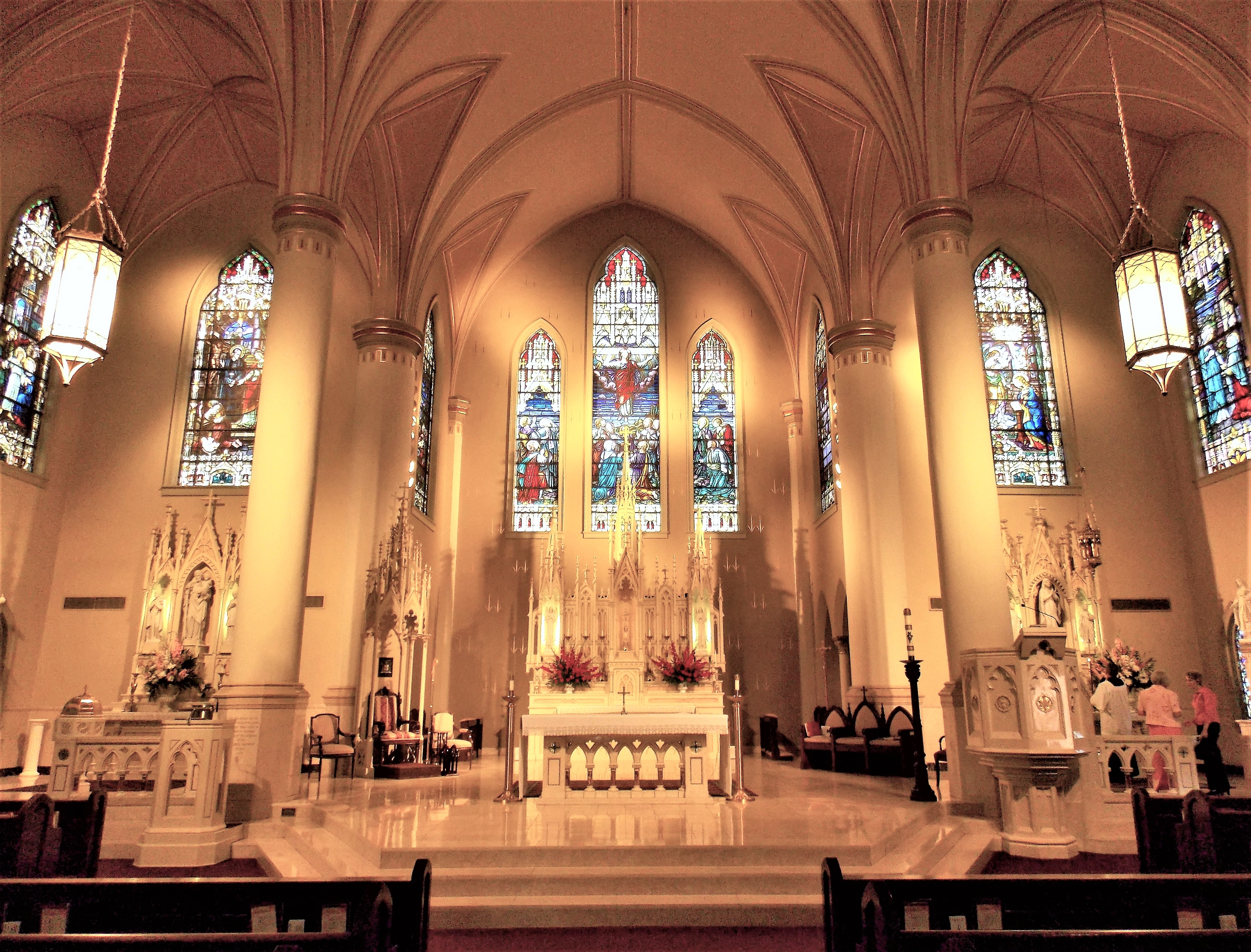
Nave looking toward the chancel

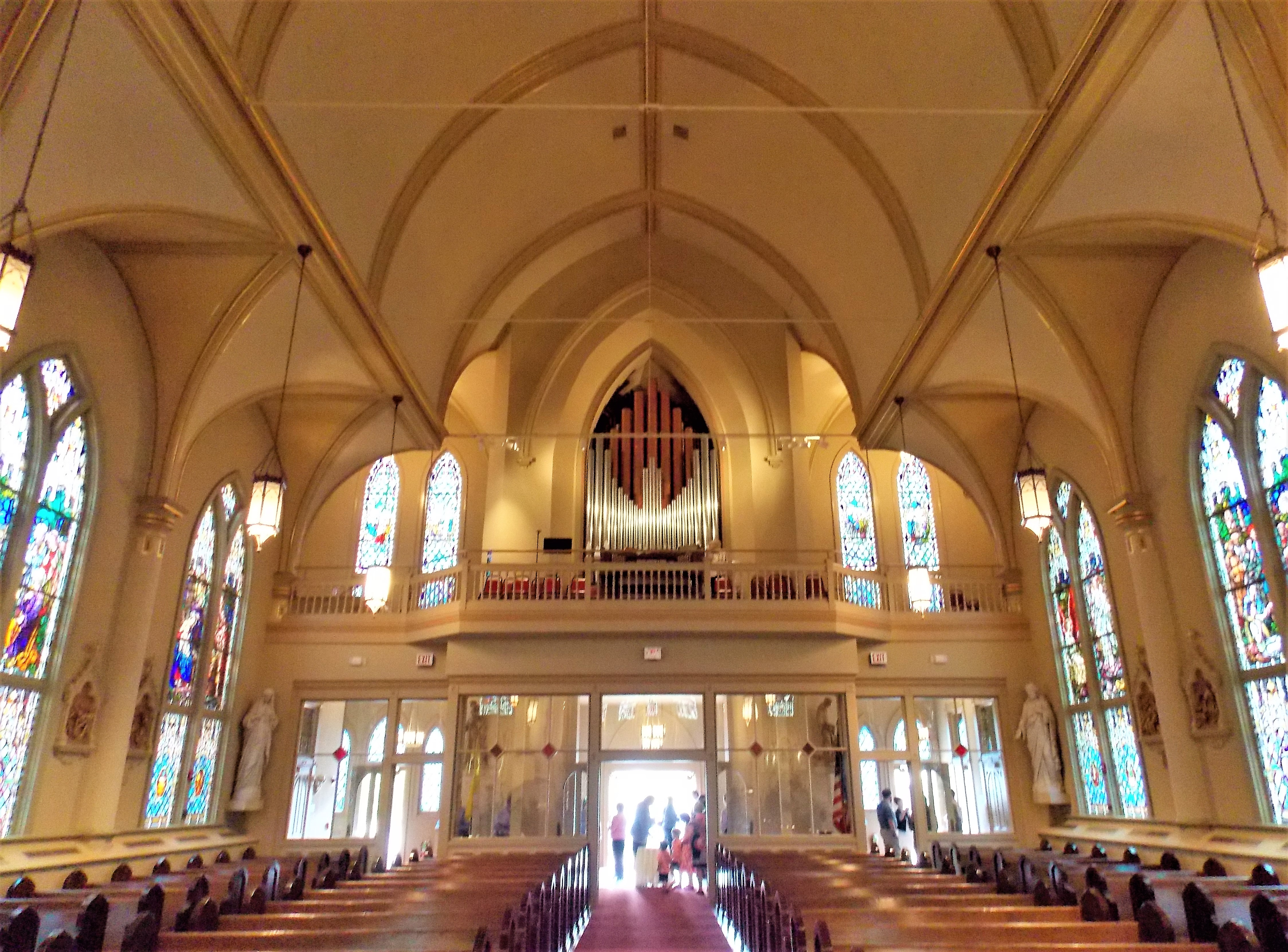
Nave looking toward gallery

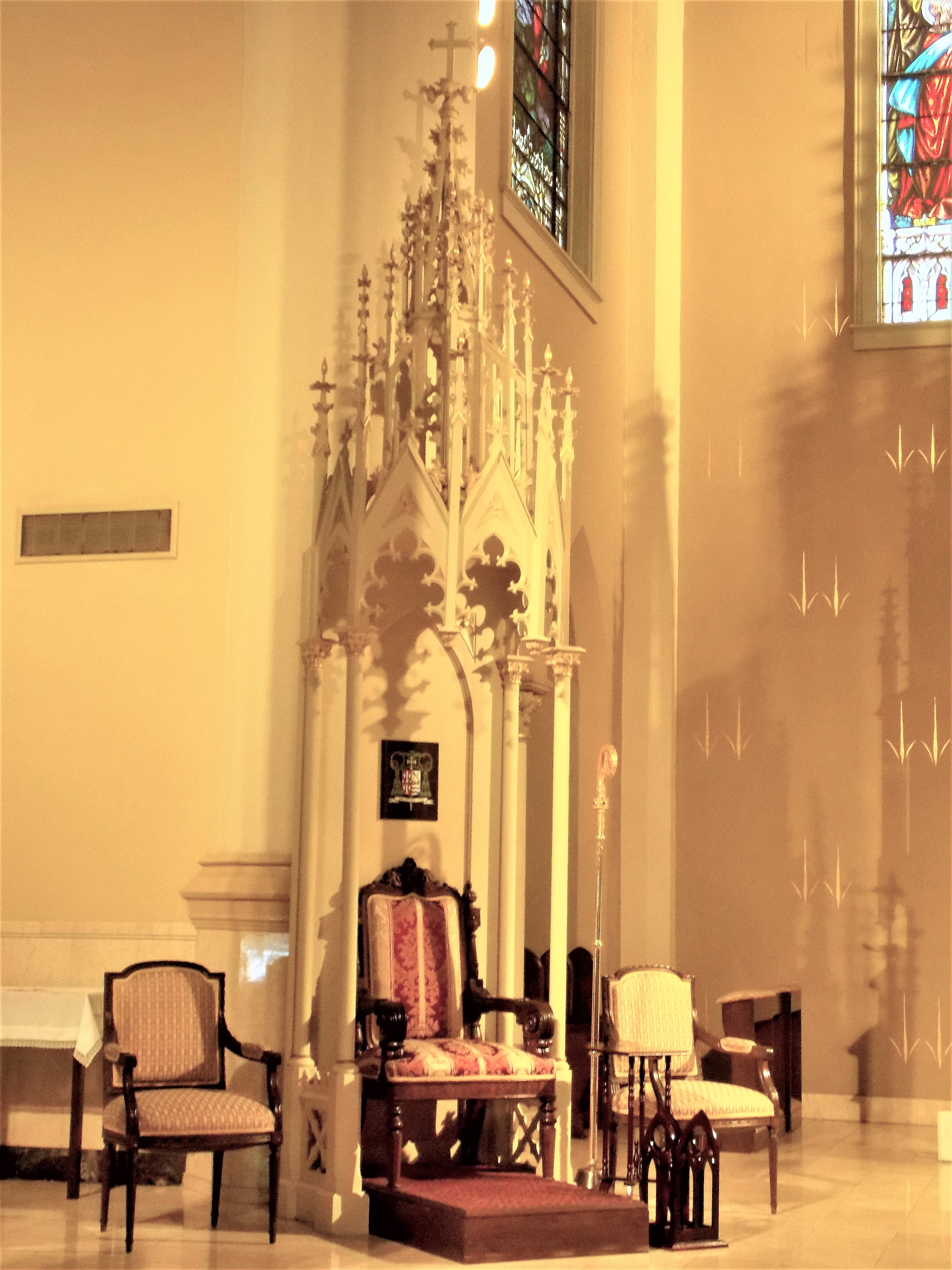
Cathedra

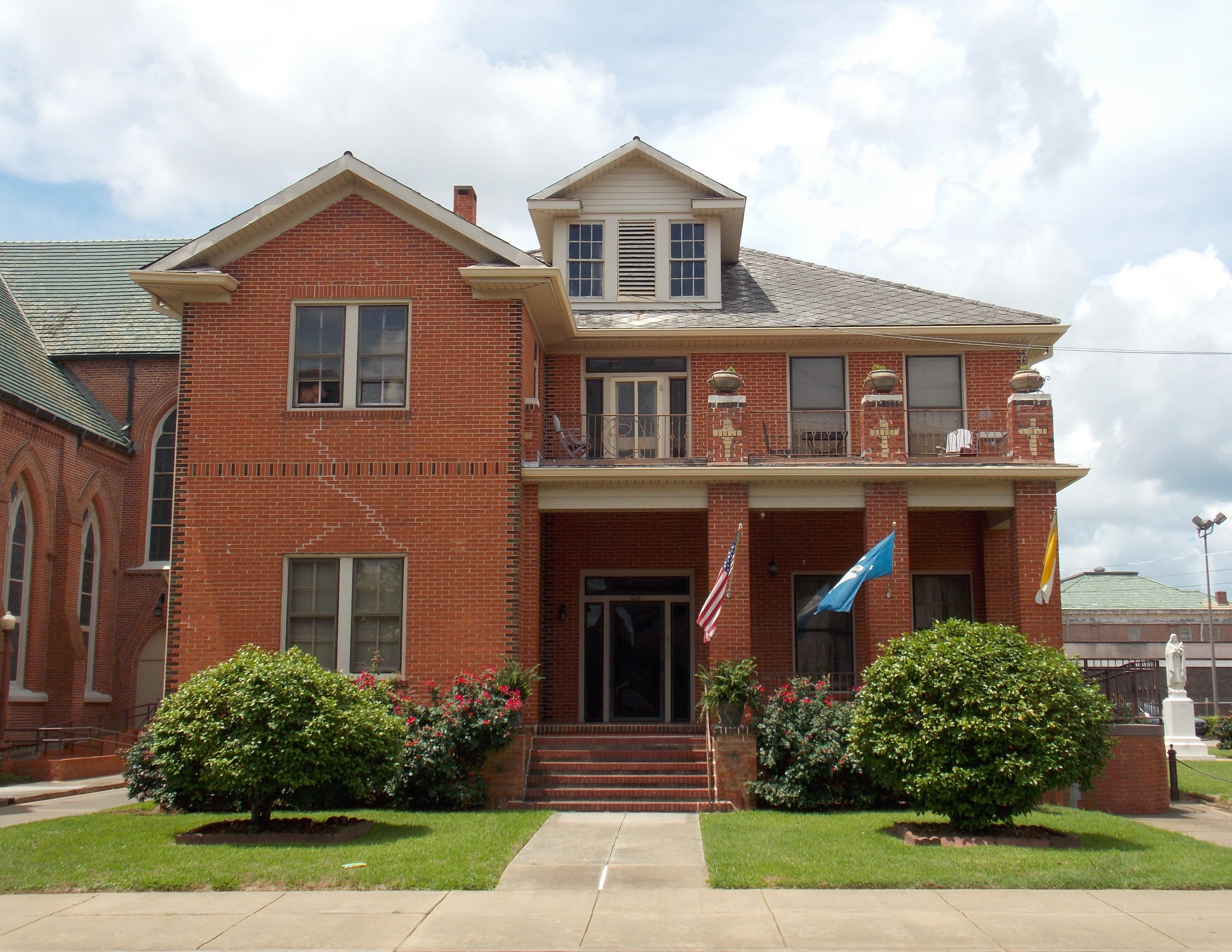
Rectory

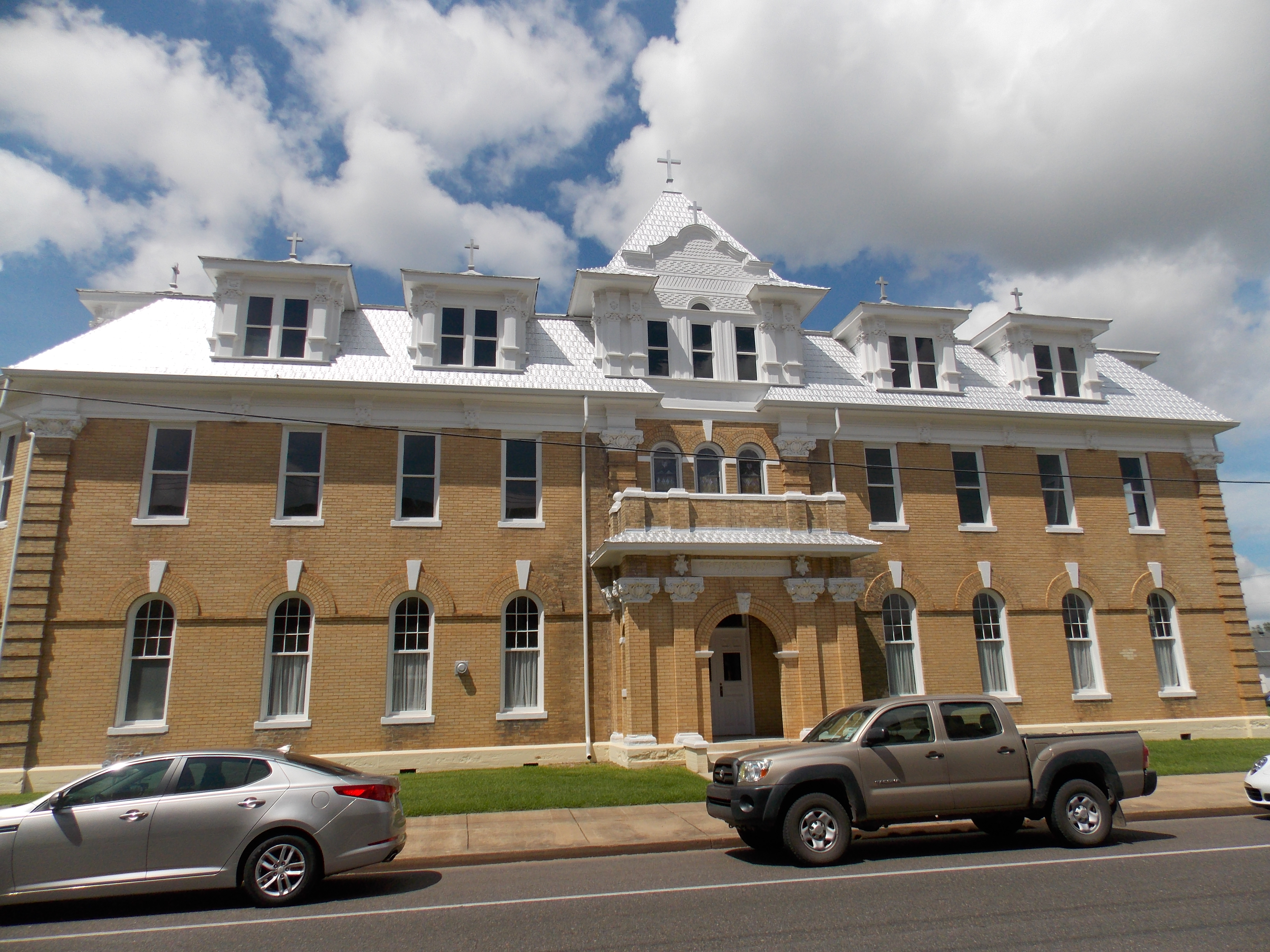
St. Francis Xavier Academy

== See also ==
- List of Catholic cathedrals in the United States
- List of cathedrals in the United States
