= Diocese of Alexandria in Louisiana =

Latin Catholic jurisdiction in the US

Coordinates: 31°17′34″N 92°27′33″W

Diocese of Alexandria in Louisiana Diœcesis Alexandrina in Louisiana
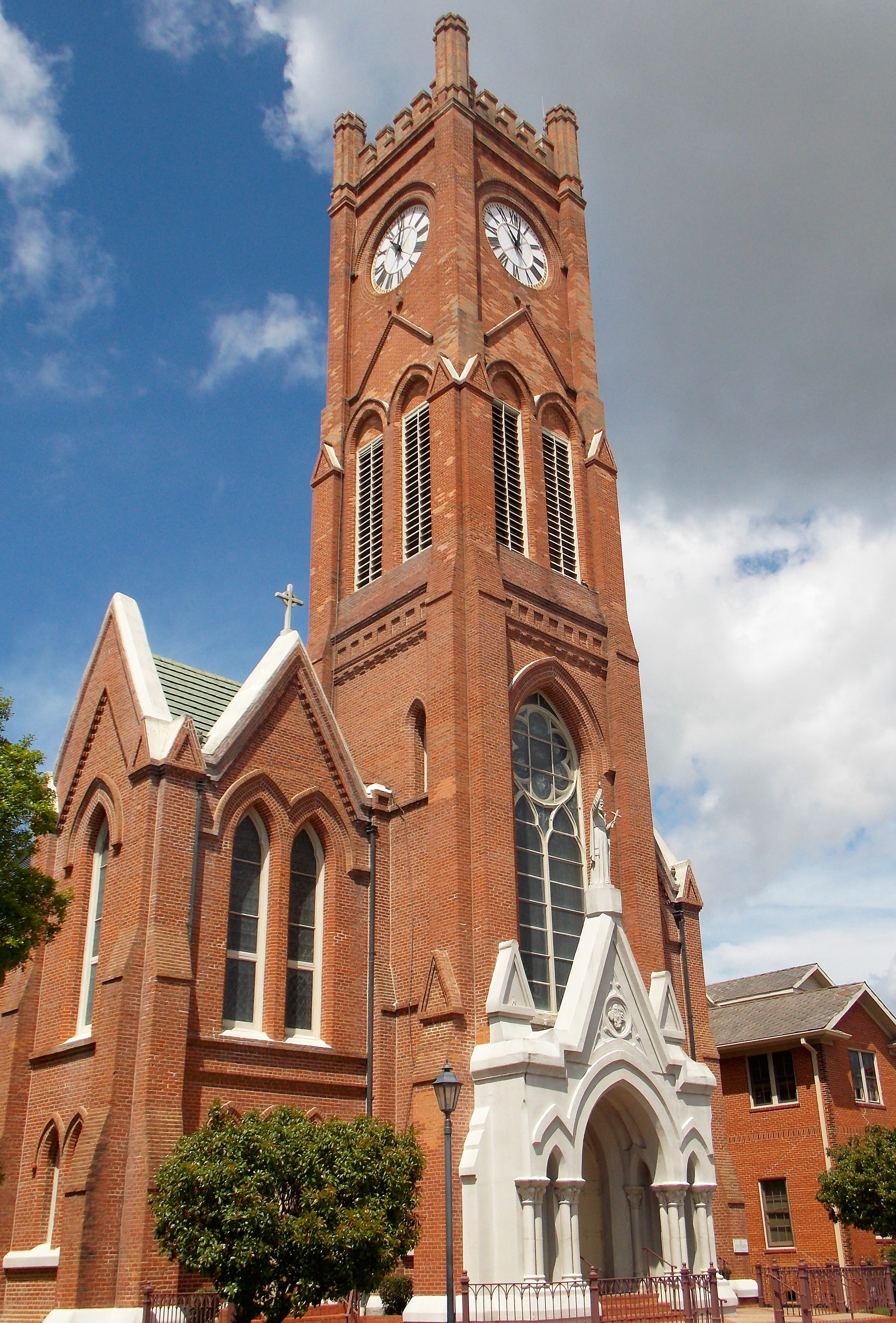
- St. Francis Xavier Cathedral

- Coat of arms

Location
- Country: United States
- Territory: Parishes of Avoyelles, Rapides, Vernon, Natchitoches, Winn, Caldwell, Madison, Franklin, Tensas, Concordia, Catahoula Parish, Lasalle, Grant
- Ecclesiastical province: Archdiocese of New Orleans

Statistics
- Area: 28,780 sq mi (74,500 km^{2})
- Population: Total; Catholics: (as of 2012); 395,000; 44,600 (11.3%)
- Parishes: 50

Information
- Denomination: Catholic
- Sui iuris church: Latin Church
- Rite: Roman Rite
- Established: 1853
- Cathedral: St. Francis Xavier Cathedral
- Patron saint: St. Francis Xavier

Current leadership
- Pope: Leo XIV
- Bishop: Robert W. Marshall
- Metropolitan Archbishop: James F. Checchio

Map
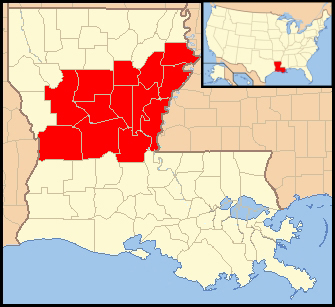

Website
- diocesealex.org

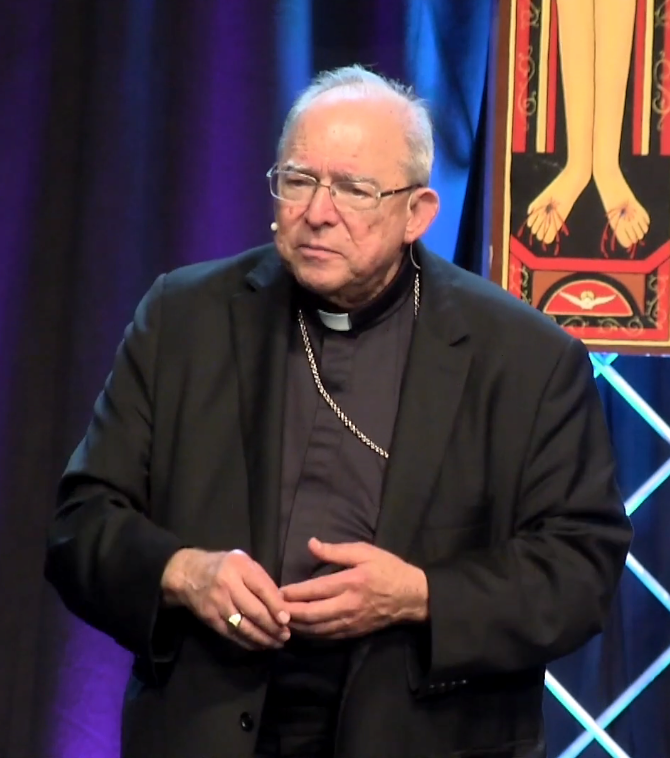
Bishop Jacobs (2019)

The Diocese of Alexandria in Louisiana (Latin: Diœcesis Alexandrina in Louisiana) is a diocese of the Catholic Church in central Louisiana in the United States. It is a suffragan diocese in the ecclesiastical province of the metropolitan Archdiocese of New Orleans. The diocesan cathedral is St. Francis Xavier Cathedral in Alexandria. The current bishop is Robert W. Marshall.

== Name ==
Since 1853, this diocese has undergone four name changes:

- Diocese of Natchitoches (1853 to 1910), defunct
- Diocese of Alexandria (1910 to 1976), defunct
- Diocese of Alexandria-Shreveport (1976 to 1986), defunct
- Diocese of Alexandria in Louisiana (1986 to present)

== Statistics ==
The Diocese of Alexandria in Louisiana covers 27,810 km^{2}. It includes the following civil parishes: Avoyelles, Rapides, Vernon, Natchitoches, Winn, Caldwell, Madison, Franklin, Tensas, Concordia, Catahoula, LaSalle, and Grant.

As of 2023, the diocese had a Catholic population of 37,816 in 50 parishes and 21 missions. It was served by 65 diocesan priests, 13 extern priests and four religious priests. The diocese also had 31 permanent deacons and 17 nuns.

== History ==
=== 1700 to 1800 ===
The Spanish Franciscan Antonio Margil was the first Catholic priest in what is today the Diocese of Alexandria in Louisiana. At the time, all of Louisiana was part of New France a colony of France. In 1717, Margil made contact with Adayes Native Americans living near Spanish Lake in what is now Sabine Parish. He founded the mission of San Miguel de Linares. Leaving the priest Gusman in charge of the mission, Margil journeyed on foot to Natchitoches to minister to the French Catholics there, then returned to Texas.

In 1718, during a brief war with Spain, French soldiers plundered the Adayes mission, scaring off the congregants. When Margil returned in 1721, he persuaded the Adayes people to return to the mission. They rebuilt the church, dedicating it to Our Lady of the Pillar. Franciscan priests operated the Adayes mission after that. By 1725, there were 50 Catholic families living in Natchitoches. French Catholics established a mission near Natchitoches around 1782.

With the end of the Seven Years War with the Treaty of Paris in 1763, France surrendered all of its colonies in North America. Spain received Louisiana, along with a vast stretch of the North American continent.The Vatican in 1793 established the Diocese of Louisiana and the Floridas, covering a large sections of land in the American South.

=== 1800 to 1850 ===
France in 1800 regained control of the colonies it surrendered to Spain in 1763 with the signing of the Third Treaty of San Ildefonso. However, three years later, the French Emperor Napoleon Bonaparte sold these colonies to the United States in the Louisiana Purchase. Louisiana was now part of the United States.

In 1817, the St. Xavier Chapel was constructed in Alexandria, its first Catholic facility. In 1826, the Vatican suppressed the Diocese of Louisiana and the Floridas, replacing it with the Diocese of New Orleans. The Alexandria area would remain part of the Diocese of New Orleans, succeeded by the Archdiocese of New Orleans, for the next 27 years.

In 1829, a priest named Martin of Avoyelles visited Catholics living along the Red, Black, and Ouachita rivers in Louisiana. In 1834, St. Francis Xavier parish replaced its chapel with a wooden church; it later became the first cathedral of the diocese. By 1840, John Timon, then prefect apostolic of the Republic of Texas, was making regular visits to missions in northern Louisiana.

During this time period, a Dominican priest from Louisville named O'Brien was visiting Catholics living along the Mississippi River every year. These Catholics periodically drifted on barges to New Orleans to have the priests there bless their marriages and baptize their children.The Sisters of the Sacred Heart opened a convent and school at Natchitoches in 1847.

=== 1850 to 1910 ===
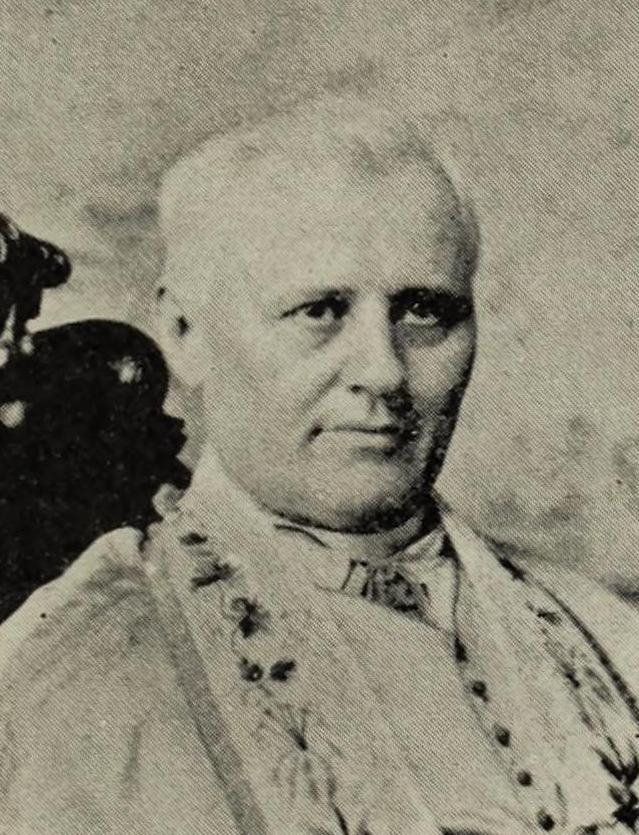
Bishop Durier (1889)

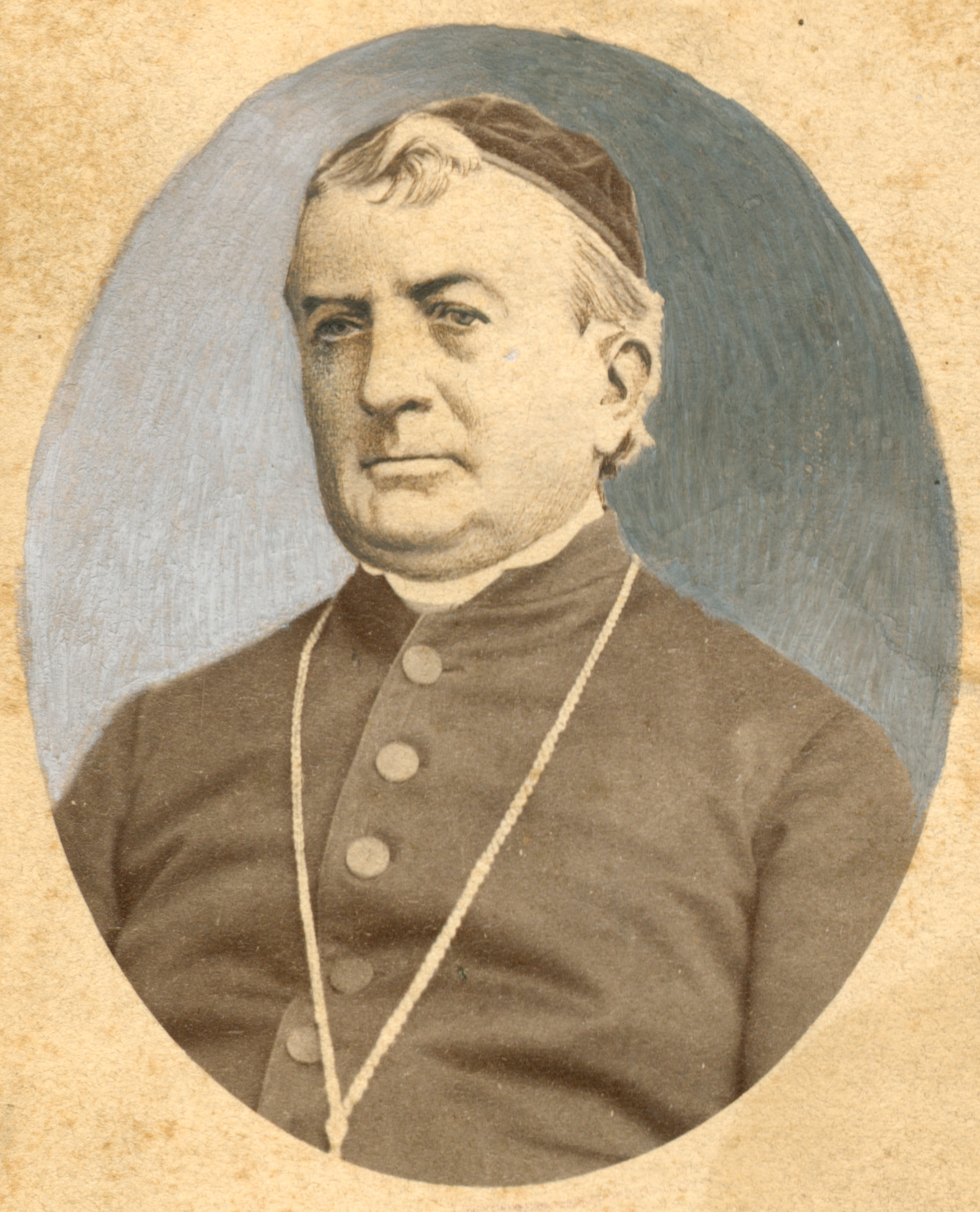
Bishop Marin (pre-1875)

Pope Pius IX erected the Diocese of Natchitoches in 1853, taking most of the State of Louisiana from the Archdiocese of New Orleans. He appointed Augustus Martin from the Diocese of Vincennes as its first bishop. After taking office, Martin had one priest to cover the entire diocese. The Daughters of the Cross ran several convents in the diocese. During his 22-year-long tenure, Martin recruited priests and religious from Europe for the diocese, established a seminary to train native clergy, founded numerous missions, and erected the first cathedral in Natchitoches. He died in 1875.

The second bishop of Natchitoches was Francis Xavier Leray of Natchez, appointed by the Vatican in 1876. During his short tenure, Leray created two new parishes and ordered the use of English instead of French in all church homilies and other instruction. After only two years in Natchitoches, the same pope named Leray in 1879 as coadjutor archbishop of New Orleans.

There would be no bishop in Natchitoches for the next five years, until Anthony Durier of New Orleans was named by Pope Leo XIII in 1884. In 1886, Durier ordered every parish in the diocese to establish a parochial school, and in 1889 he organized the first Catholic school board. He invited several religious orders to the diocese, such as the Sisters of Divine Providence, the Carmelites, and the Jesuits, who established schools in Alexandria, Mansfield, and Shreveport, all in Louisiana. He opened six schools for African-American children, with a total enrollment of more than 300 pupils in 1894.

Durier established seven new parishes and finished construction on the Cathedral of the Immaculate Conception in Natchitoches, which he consecrated in September 1892. In 1899, the latest St. Francis Xavier Church in Alexandria was completed; it would later become the cathedral for the diocese.After Durier died in 1904, Cornelius Van de Ven was appointed by the Vatican as the next bishop of Natchitoches.

=== 1910 to 1976 ===
On August 6. 1910, Pius X renamed the Diocese of Natchitoches as the Diocese of Alexandria. St. Francis Xavier Church became the new diocesan cathedral. Van de Ven recruited the Sisters of Charity of the Incarnate Word to the diocese. In 1908, the sisters took over the Schumpert Hospital in Shreveport and opened the St. Joseph's Orphanage. Van de Ven promoted lay organizations and served as state chaplain of the Knights of Columbus. During his tenure, new churches and parochial schools were established for African-American Catholics in Marksville and Mansura, Louisiana. Van de Ven died in 1932.

The second bishop of Alexandria was Daniel Desmond from the Archdiocese of Boston, installed in 1932. Desmond established ten new schools, 22 parishes, and 35 churches. He died in 1945. To replace Desmond, Pope Pius XII appointed Charles Greco of New Orleans as the next bishop of Alexandria. During his tenure, Greco established 33 parishes, over 125 churches and chapels, 100 convents and rectories, and seven health-care facilities. In 1950, St. Frances Cabrini Hospital opened in Alexandria. It is today Christus St. Frances Cabrini Hospital.

Greco resigned in 1973.Pope Paul VI appointed Auxiliary Bishop Lawrence Graves of the Diocese of Little Rock as the next bishop of Alexandria in 1973.

=== 1976 to 1986 ===
In 1976, Paul VI renamed the Diocese of Alexandria as the Diocese of Alexandria-Shreveport to reflect the population growth in Shreveport. The Church of St. John Berchmans in Shreveport was designated as the co-cathedral in the diocese. During his tenure, Graves established or improved continuing education for priests, offices for religious education and youth ministry, the permanent diaconate program, and the communications apostolate in newspaper, radio, and television. Graves died in 1982. The second bishop of Alexandria-Shreveport was Auxiliary Bishop William Friend from the Diocese of Mobile-Birmingham, named by Pope John Paul II that same year.

=== 1986 to 2020 ===
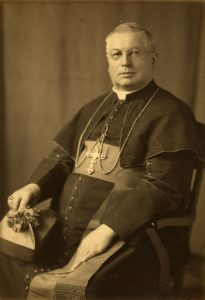
Bishop Van de Ven (1920)

In 1986, John Paul II suppressed the Diocese of Alexandria-Shreveport and created two new dioceses: the Diocese of Shreveport and the Diocese of Alexandria in Louisiana. The pope appointed Friend as bishop of Shreveport and John Favalora of New Orleans as bishop of Alexandria in Louisiana.

After three years, John Paul II in 1989 named Favalora as bishop of the Diocese of St. Petersburg. Sam Jacobs of the Diocese of Lafayette in Louisiana was named by the pope as Favarola's successor. Under Jacobs, the diocese inaugurated the Steubenville South Youth Conference, an annual event in Alexandria.He also constructed a new youth center at the Maryhill Renewal Center in Alexandria, to accommodate youth retreats. In 2003, Jacobs was named bishop of the Diocese of Houma-Thibodaux.

In 2004, Ronald Herzog of the Diocese of Biloxi was appointed bishop of Alexandria in Louisiana by John Paul II. In 2016, Pope Francis named Auxiliary Bishop David Talley of the Archdiocese of Atlanta as coadjutor bishop in the diocese to assist Herzog. When Herzog retired in 2017, Talley became bishop. Two years later in 2019, Talley was transferred to the Diocese of Memphis.

=== 2020 to present ===
Immaculate Heart of Mary Catholic Church in Tioga was the scene of a vandalism spree in September 2020 by Chandler D. Johnson. During that period, he broke six windows on the church building and smashed several outside statutes. He was charged with one count of criminal trespassing and one count of institutional vandalism.

In October 2024, the diocese announced that it was preparing to file for Chapter 11 bankruptcy protection as it continues to face several sexual abuse lawsuits. The diocese filed for Chapter 11 bankruptcy on October 31, 2025. The diocese in January 2026 released a draft of proposed closings and mergers of parishes throughout the diocese.The current bishop of Alexandria in Louisiana, since 2020, is Robert W. Marshall of the Diocese of Memphis.

=== Sexual abuse ===
A 2002 article by the Dallas Morning News revealed that in 1998 Jacobs received an allegation of fondling against John Andries, a priest in the civil parish of Natchitoches. Jacobs suspended Andries and removed him from his church parish. However, after Andries received counseling and testing, Jacobs returned him to the same church parish. Jacobs did not notify authorities about the accusation. In 2002, Andries was charged with abuse of a minor while sleeping at a family's house in Abbeville. The boy's family sued Jacobs and the diocese In May 2003, Andries pleaded guilty to charges of molestation of a juvenile and was sentenced to five years in prison, with three years suspended. He was laicized in 2007.

The diocese in 2006 suspended Frederick Lyons, a retired priest, from ministry after receiving allegations from two individuals that he sexually abused them as minors. In November 2023, the Congregation for the Doctrine of Faith ordered Lyons to follow a life of prayer and penance and stripped him of the title of protonotary apostolic supernumerary.

The diocese in March 2013 removed Jamie Medina-Cruz, a priest at St. Mary's Assumption Parish in Cottonport, after he was arrested on charges of sexual misconduct with a minor. Medina-Cruz was found dead in a motel room in Alexandria in June 2013.

In February 2019, the diocese released the names of 27 diocesan clergy who were accused of committing sexual abuse. Two clergy on this list were convicted while three others gave financial settlements to their victims. Three more names were added to this list in June 2019. Theodore Lelieveld was added to the clergy list in September 2019 after sexual abuse allegations against him from the 1960s were deemed credible.

== Bishops ==
=== Bishops of Natchitoches ===
1. Augustus Marie Martin (1853 – 1875)
2. Francis Xavier Leray (1876 – 1879), appointed Coadjutor Archbishop and later Archbishop of New Orleans
3. Anthony Durier (1884 – 1904)
4. Cornelius Van de Ven (1904 – 1910), title changed with title of see

=== Bishops of Alexandria ===
1. Cornelius Van de Ven (1910 – 1932)
2. Daniel Francis Desmond (1932 – 1945)
3. Charles Pasquale Greco (1946 – 1973)
4. Lawrence Preston Joseph Graves (1973 – 1976), title changed with title of see

=== Bishops of Alexandria-Shreveport ===
1. Lawrence Preston Joseph Graves (1976 – 1982)
2. William Benedict Friend (1982 – 1986), appointed Bishop of Shreveport

=== Bishops of Alexandria in Louisiana ===
1. John C. Favalora (1986 – 1989), appointed Bishop of Saint Petersburg and later Archbishop of Miami
2. Sam G. Jacobs (1989 – 2003), appointed Bishop of Houma – Thibodaux
3. Ronald Paul Herzog (2004 – 2017)
4. David Talley (2017 – 2019; coadjutor 2016 – 2017)
5. Robert W. Marshall (2020 – present)

== Coat of arms ==
Coat of arms of Diocese of Alexandria in Louisiana
Notes Arms was designed and adopted when the diocese was erected. Adopted 1853 Escutcheon The coat of arms contains a silver cross, four silver bells and a black and gold crescent on a red background Symbolism The red background represents the Red River, which runs through Alexandria. The cross with the four bells comes from the arms of the Patriarchate of Alexandria in Egypt. The crescent represents Saint Francis Xavier, titular patron of the diocese.

== Education ==
As of 2026, the Diocese of Alexandria had three high schools and seven elementary schools, with a total student enrollment of approximately 4,100.

PK-12 schools

- St. Joseph School – Plaucheville
- St. Mary's Catholic School – Natchitoches

Middle and high schools

- Holy Savior Menard – Alexandria

K-8 schools

- St. Anthony of Padua School - Bunkie
- St. Frances Cabrini School - Alexandria
- St. Mary's Assumption School - Cottonport
- Sacred Heart School - Moureauville

Elementary schools

- Our Lady of Prompt Succor School - Alexandria - It is in the Garden District. It was K-8 until 1988, when grades 7-8 were moved to Menard.

== Sources and external links ==
- GCatholic, with Google map and satellite photo - data for most sections
- Roman Catholic Diocese of Alexandria Official Site
