= David Talley =

His Excellency, The Most Reverend David Prescott Talley
- Bishop of Memphis
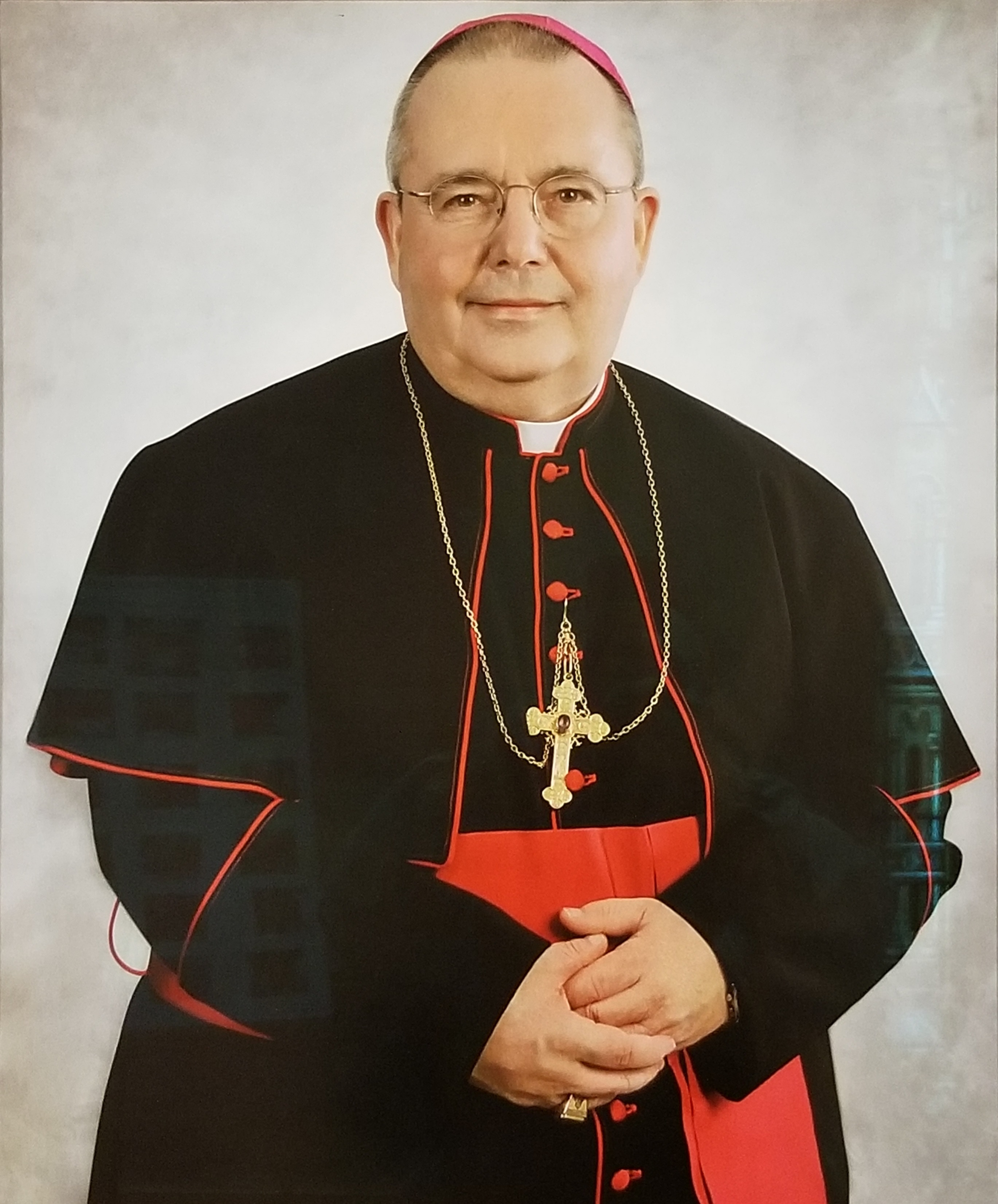
- Diocese: Memphis
- Appointed: March 5, 2019
- Installed: April 2, 2019
- Predecessor: Martin Holley
- Previous posts: Auxiliary Bishop of Atlanta and Titular Bishop of Lambaesis (2013–2016); Coadjutor Bishop of Alexandria in Louisiana (2016–2017); Bishop of Alexandria in Louisiana (2017–2019)

Orders
- Ordination: June 3, 1989 by Eugene Antonio Marino
- Consecration: April 2, 2013 by Wilton Daniel Gregory, Luis Rafael Zarama, and Gregory John Hartmayer

Personal details
- Born: September 11, 1950 (age 76) Columbus, Georgia, US
- Denomination: Roman Catholic
- Education: Auburn University; University of Georgia; Saint Meinrad Seminary; Pontifical Gregorian University
- Motto: Dabo vobis cor novum (He will give you a new heart)

Styles of David Prescott Talley
- Reference style: His Excellency; The Most Reverend
- Spoken style: Your Excellency
- Religious style: Bishop

David Prescott Talley (born September 11, 1950) is an American Catholic prelate who has served as bishop of Memphis in Tennessee since 2019.

Talley previously served as coadjutor bishop and bishop of the Diocese of Alexandria in Louisiana (2016 to 2019) and as an auxiliary bishop of the Archdiocese of Atlanta in Georgia (2013 to 2016).

== Biography ==
=== Early life ===
David Talley was born in Columbus, Georgia, on September 11, 1950. Raised as a Southern Baptist, Talley converted to Catholicism in 1974 while in college. After graduating from Auburn University in Auburn, Alabama, he entered the University of Georgia in Athens, Georgia, receiving a Master of Social Work degree. Talley then served as a children's caseworker in Fulton County, Georgia.

After deciding to enter the priesthood, Talley began his studies at St. Meinrad School of Theology in St. Meinrad, Indiana. He received a Master of Divinity degree from St. Meinrad in 1989.

=== Priesthood ===
Talley was ordained into the priesthood by Archbishop Eugene Marino on June 3, 1989, for the Archdiocese of Atlanta at the Cathedral of Christ the King in Atlanta. After his 1989 ordination, the archdiocese assigned Talley as parochial vicar at St. Jude the Apostle Parish in Atlanta.

In 1993, the archdiocese sent Talley to Rome to study at the Pontifical Gregorian University, where he earned his Doctorate in Canon Law in 1998. After Talley returned to Atlanta, he was named as an officer of the archdiocesan tribunal and as director of vocations. Archbishop John Donoghue appointed Talley as chancellor of the archdiocese in October 1999. He also served as chaplain to the disabilities ministry. Talley continued his studies in spiritual direction and spirituality at Spring Hill College in Mobile, Alabama. The Vatican in 2001 elevated Talley to the rank of chaplain of his holiness with the title of monsignor.

=== Auxiliary Bishop of Atlanta ===
Coat of arms as auxiliary bishop of Atlanta

On January 3, 2013, Pope Benedict XVI appointed Talley as an auxiliary bishop of Atlanta and titular bishop of Lambaesis. He was consecrated at the Cathedral of Christ the King on April 2, 2013, by Archbishop Wilton Gregory, with Bishops Luis Zarama and Archbishop Gregory Hartmayer serving as co-consecrators. Talley became the first native-born Georgian to serve as a bishop in the archdiocese.

=== Coadjutor Bishop and Bishop of Alexandria in Louisiana ===
On September 21, 2016, Talley was appointed as coadjutor bishop of Alexandria in Louisiana by Pope Francis to assist Bishop Ronald Herzog. He was installed on November 7, 2016. When Herzog retired on February 2, 2017, Talley automatically succeeded him as bishop of Alexandria.

=== Bishop of Memphis ===
On March 5, 2019, Francis appointed Talley as bishop of Memphis. He was installed on April 2, 2019. After his installation as bishop, Talley ordered a comprehensive review of prior sexual abuse allegations by the diocese and by an outside firm. In February 2020, the diocese released a list of 20 diocesan priests with credible accusations of sexual abuse of minors.

Talley has served as chair of the US Conference of Catholic Bishops Subcommittee on the Catholic Campaign for Human Development He has also been a member of the Committee on National Collections and the Committee on Ecumenical and Interreligious Affairs.

== See also ==
- Catholic Church hierarchy
- Catholic Church in the United States
- Historical list of the Catholic bishops of the United States
- List of Catholic bishops of the United States
- Lists of patriarchs, archbishops, and bishops

Catholic Church titles
Preceded by Martin Holley	Bishop of Memphis; 2019–present	Succeeded by Incumbent
Preceded by Ronald Paul Herzog	Bishop of Alexandria; 2016–2019	Succeeded by Robert W. Marshall
Preceded by -	Auxiliary Bishop of Atlanta; 2013–2016	Succeeded by -
