= J. Terry Steib =

American Catholic retired prelate

His Excellency, The Most Reverend James Terry Steib SVD
- Bishop Emeritus of Memphis
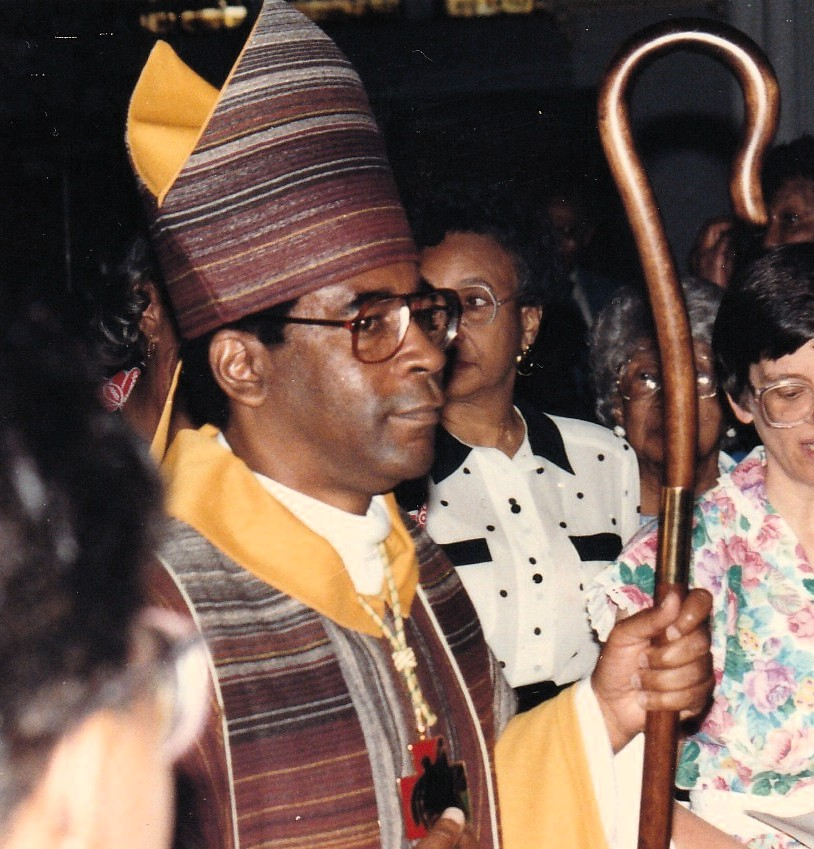
- Bishop Steib in 1989
- Diocese: Memphis
- Appointed: March 24, 1993
- Installed: May 5, 1993
- Retired: August 23, 2016
- Predecessor: Daniel M. Buechlein
- Successor: Martin Holley
- Previous post: Auxiliary Bishop of St. Louis and Titular Bishop of Fallaba (1984-1993)

Orders
- Ordination: January 6, 1967 by Philip Matthew Hannan
- Consecration: February 10, 1984 by John L. May, George Joseph Gottwald, and Charles Roman Koester

Personal details
- Born: May 17, 1940 (age 86) Vacherie, Louisiana, US
- Motto: The Lord is my light

Styles of James Terry Steib
- Reference style: His Excellency; The Most Reverend
- Spoken style: Your Excellency
- Religious style: Bishop

James Terry Steib, SVD (born May 17, 1940) is an American Catholic retired prelate who served as Bishop of Memphis from 1993 to 2016. He previously served as an auxiliary bishop for the Archdiocese of St. Louis from 1983 to 1993. He was the first African American to lead the Diocese of Memphis and is a member of the Society of the Divine Word.

== Biography ==
=== Early life ===
James Terry Steib was born on May 17, 1940, in Vacherie, Louisiana, one of five children of Rosemond and Vivian Steib. As a child, Steib worked with his family harvesting sugar cane. After graduating from high school, Steib attended St. Augustine Seminary in Bay St. Louis, Mississippi, and St. Michael's Mission House Seminary in Conesus, New York. He graduated with a bachelor's degree from St. Mary's Mission Seminary in Techny, Illinois.

=== Priesthood ===
On January 6, 1967, Steib was ordained as a priest by Archbishop Philip Matthew Hannan for the Vervites in Bay St. Louis. After his ordination, the Verbites assigned Steib to Saint Stanislaus College in Bay St. Louis, teaching English, literature, religion, reading and speech to high school students. He also held a position as assistant dean of students at Saint Stanislaus from 1967 to 1969. In 1973, Steib graduated from Xavier University in New Orleans with a master's degree in guidance and counseling.

In 1976, the Verbites appointed Steib as provincial superior of their Southern Province, holding that position for three years. In 1979, he became vice president of the Conference of Major Superiors of Men.

=== Auxiliary Bishop of St. Louis ===
On December 6, 1983, Pope John Paul II appointed Steib as an auxiliary bishop of St. Louis and titular bishop of Fallaba. He was consecrated in St. Louis, Missouri, on February 10, 1984, by Archbishop John L. May, with Auxiliary Bishops George Gottwald and Charles Koester serving as co-consecrators.

=== Bishop of Memphis ===
On March 24, 1993, John Paul II appointed Steib as bishop of Memphis. He was installed on May 5, 1993. One of Steib's primary accomplishments was reopening eight Catholic schools in Memphis that had been closed for financial reasons by a previous bishop. In an interview, Steib commented on this:

When we closed a school in an urban area, we were leaving more than buildings behind; we were leaving behind children who yearned for a Catholic school more than ever. It is the heritage of Catholic education to lift up those most in need.

In 2004, a Memphis man named Steib and the diocese in a sexual abuse lawsuit. The plaintiff claimed that Reverend Juan Carlos Duran, a Bolivian priest at Ascension Parish in Raleigh, Tennessee, had sexually abused him in 1999 when his was 14 years old. After a church investigation, Steib banned Duran from public ministry and sent him to a center for treatment. Duran was eventually defrocked. In 2006. the diocese settled the case for $2 million. When interviewed for a deposition in the case, Steib had these comments:

I don’t know that the church did not respond appropriately. I think it responded according to what it knew and believed at the time. I think that many of the times saw this as a very moral issue … and … you remove the person … from the temptation or the sin, you know.

In June 2005, Steib expressed his views on outreach to gays and lesbians in his pastoral letter "This Far by Faith":

To be sure that we do not leave anyone behind…to be sure that we promote genuine gratitude and reverence for the gift that each one of us is to the Church, we have begun to lay the foundations for a diocesan ministry with Catholic gay and lesbian persons.

In 2005, a man sued Steib and the diocese in a case involving Reverend Paul St. Charles, a leader the Catholic Youth Organization in the diocese. The plaintiff accused St. Charles of molesting him at a drive-in movie when he was an altar server in the 1970s. Steib had ordered a diocese review of the allegations in 2004 and then suspended St. Charles from ministry. In 2009, Steib responded to protests by other American bishops over the University of Notre Dame inviting President Barack Obama to speak at its commencement ceremony, due to Obama's position on abortion rights for women. Steib remarked:

Nothing was done during other administrations, nothing was said when other presidents who favored the war in Iraq with its constant killing, or who favored capital punishment were given awards in the name of the Church, even though those presidents were not adhering to Catholic Right to Life principles.

On December 21, 2015, the Memphis City Council renamed a portion of Central Avenue as J. Terry Steib Lane in honor of the bishop. On August 23, 2016, Pope Francis accepted Steib's letter of resignation as bishop of Memphis.

== See also ==
- Catholic Church hierarchy
- Catholic Church in the United States
- Historical list of the Catholic bishops of the United States
- List of Catholic bishops of the United States
- Lists of patriarchs, archbishops, and bishops

Catholic Church titles
Preceded by Daniel M. Buechlein	Bishop of Memphis; 1993–2016	Succeeded by Martin Holley
Preceded by –	Auxiliary Bishop of St. Louis; 1984–1993	Succeeded by –
