= List of National Historic Landmarks in Louisiana =

This is a complete list of National Historic Landmarks in Louisiana,.

The United States National Historic Landmark program is a program of the National Park Service, and recognizes structures, districts, objects, and similar resources according to a list of criteria of national significance.

The state of Louisiana is home to 54 of these landmarks, spanning a range of history from early to modern times. The most recently designated is the Mr. Charlie Offshore Oilrig, designated in 2024. Three listings have had their designations withdrawn.

The sternwheeler steamboat Delta Queen has been relocated to Chattanooga and is now listed as an NHL of Tennessee.

== Key ==
	National Historic Landmark
^{†}	National Historic Landmark District
^{#}	National Historic Site, National Historical Park, National Memorial, or National Monument
^{*}	Delisted Landmark

== National Historic Landmarks ==
	Landmark name	Image	Date designated	Location	Parish	Description
1	Acadian House	Acadian House	May 30, 1974 (#73002133)	St. Martinville; 30°08′11″N 91°49′30″W	St. Martin	Acadian house, also known as Maison Olivier and is a part of the Longfellow–Evangeline State Historic Site.
2	The Cabildo	The Cabildo	October 9, 1960 (#66000373)	New Orleans; 29°57′27″N 90°03′50″W	Orleans	Late 18th-century building on Jackson Square; city hall from the colonial era through early 19th century; now one of the properties of the Louisiana State Museum.
3	George Washington Cable House	George Washington Cable House	December 29, 1962 (#66000374)	New Orleans; 29°55′35″N 90°05′13″W	Orleans	Garden District cottage home of author George Washington Cable.
4^{†}	Courthouse and Lawyers' Row	Courthouse and Lawyers' Row	May 30, 1974 (#74002249)	Clinton; 30°51′59″N 91°01′06″W	East Feliciana	Built in the mid-19th century, this courthouse and five nearby law office buildings are examples of Greek Revival architecture.
5	James H. Dillard House	James H. Dillard House	December 2, 1974 (#74000929)	New Orleans; 29°56′10″N 90°07′36″W	Orleans	This was the home of James Hardy Dillard, an educator at Tulane University and director of the Slater Fund and Jeanes Foundation. Born in 1856, Dillard spent most of his life improving the education of blacks in the United States.
6	Evergreen Plantation	Evergreen Plantation	April 27, 1992 (#91001386)	Wallace; 30°01′38″N 90°38′26″W	St. John the Baptist	Composed of 37 buildings, including a main house and 22 extant slave cabins, Evergreen Plantation is an intact example of major plantation complexes found during the antebellum era of the Southern United States. Open to visitors.
7	Fort De La Boulaye		October 9, 1960 (#66000378)	Phoenix; 29°38′57″N 89°56′40″W	Plaquemines	Fort De La Boulaye was a fort built in 1699–1700, when France took control of the mouth of the Mississippi River.
8	Fort Jackson	Fort Jackson	December 19, 1960 (#66000379)	Triumph; 29°21′28″N 89°27′18″W	Plaquemines	Constructed on the lower Mississippi River after the War of 1812, it was the site of the Battle of Forts Jackson and St. Philip in 1862. A public park, the fort was flooded for several weeks in 2005 after two hurricanes.
9	Fort Jesup	Fort Jesup	July 4, 1961 (#66000381)	Many; 31°36′41″N 93°24′03″W	Sabine	Fort Jesup was built in 1822–32, to help protect the western border between American and Spanish territories. Under the command of future U.S. President Zachary Taylor, soldiers at the fort monitored Texas as it passed from Spanish and Mexican control, until the Mexican–American War in 1846.
10	Fort St. Philip	Fort St. Philip	December 19, 1960 (#66000380)	Triumph; 29°21′50″N 89°27′46″W	Plaquemines	Established on the Mississippi River in the 18th century, Fort St. Philip's major engagements were 10-day naval sieges during the War of 1812 and American Civil War. The site is privately owned and has deteriorated greatly because of river flooding, erosion, and tropical storms.
11	Gallier Hall	Gallier Hall	May 30, 1974 (#74002250)	New Orleans; 29°56′56″N 90°04′15″W	Orleans	Designed by James Gallier (Sr.) in the mid-1800s; City Hall until mid-20th century and continues in use for civic and community purposes.
12	Gallier House	Gallier House	May 30, 1974 (#74000932)	New Orleans; 29°57′41″N 90°03′42″W	Orleans	Beautifully restored home designed by James Gallier Jr.
13^{†}	Garden District	Garden District	May 30, 1974 (#71000358)	New Orleans; 29°55′40″N 90°05′05″W	Orleans	
14	Nicholas Girod House	Nicholas Girod House	April 15, 1970 (#70000254)	New Orleans; 29°57′21″N 90°03′55″W	Orleans	Originally constructed in 1797, by 1821 it was owned by former Mayor Nicolas Girod, a wealthy French American who refurbished it in preparation for a rescue of Napoleon from his exile. Word was received of Napoleon's death —the building is commonly known as the Napoleon House. Since 1914 has functioned as the Napoleon House restaurant.
15	Hermann-Grima House	Hermann-Grima House	May 30, 1974 (#710003591)	New Orleans; 29°57′26″N 90°04′03″W	Orleans	
16	Homeplace Plantation House	Homeplace Plantation House	April 15, 1970 (#70000842)	Hahnville; 29°58′16″N 90°24′27″W	St. Charles	Built circa 1790, large French Colonial raised cottage. Not open to the public.
17	Jackson Square	Jackson Square	October 9, 1960 (#66000375)	New Orleans; 29°57′20″N 90°03′47″W	Orleans	Central square of the Vieux Carré, historically called the Place d'Armes (Plaza de Armas). Redesigned as a public park and renamed in the mid-19th century, by Micaela Almonester, Baroness de Pontalba.
18	USS KIDD (Destroyer)	USS KIDD (Destroyer)	January 14, 1986 (#83000502)	Baton Rouge; 30°26′40″N 91°11′29″W	East Baton Rouge	
19	Lafitte's Blacksmith Shop	Lafitte's Blacksmith Shop	April 15, 1970 (#70000255)	New Orleans; 29°57′38″N 90°03′50″W	Orleans	Late 18th-century Creole cottage, became a bar in the 20th century.
20	Longue Vue House and Gardens	Longue Vue House and Gardens	April 5, 2005 (#91001419)	New Orleans; 29°58′36″N 90°07′23″W	Orleans	
21	Los Adaes	Los Adaes	June 23, 1986 (#78001427)	Robeline; 31°42′31″N 93°17′36″W	Natchitoches	Los Adaes was the capital of Tejas, on the northeastern frontier of New Spain, from 1729 to 1770. It included a mission, San Miguel de los Adaes, and a presidio, Nuestra Senora del Pilar de Los Adaes (Our Lady of Pilar of the Adaes).
22	Louisiana State Bank Building	Louisiana State Bank Building	May 4, 1983 (#83004387)	New Orleans; 29°57′22″N 90°03′59″W	Orleans	
23	Louisiana State Capitol Building and Gardens	Louisiana State Capitol Building and Gardens	December 17, 1982 (#78001421)	Baton Rouge; 30°27′25″N 91°11′14″W	East Baton Rouge	
24	Madame John's Legacy	Madame John's Legacy	April 15, 1970 (#70000256)	New Orleans; 29°57′34″N 90°03′46″W	Orleans	One of the few French Colonial-style houses in the Quarter to survive the city's great fires of the late 18th century, its name comes from a story by George Washington Cable.
25	Madewood Plantation House	Madewood Plantation House	May 4, 1983 (#73000860)	Napoleonville; 29°55′37″N 90°59′40″W	Assumption	Architect Henry Howard's first major building, begun in 1846.
26	Magnolia Plantation	Magnolia Plantation	January 3, 2001 (#79001071)	Derry; 31°32′59″N 92°56′26″W	Natchitoches	
27	Marksville Prehistoric Indian Site	Marksville Prehistoric Indian Site	July 19, 1964 (#66000372)	Marksville; 31°07′29″N 92°02′52″W	Avoyelles	Archeological type site for Marksville culture.
28^{†}	Melrose Plantation	Melrose Plantation	May 30, 1974 (#72000556)	Melrose; 31°05′16″N 92°58′03″W	Natchitoches	Black businesswoman Marie Thérèse Coincoin created this plantation, includes perhaps the first black-for-black-designed buildings in the United States.
29	Mr. Charlie Offshore Oilrig		December 13, 2024 (#100011378)	Atchafalaya River; 29°41′28″N 91°12′35″W	St. Mary	Part of The Rig Museum; the first and oldest mobile offshore oil drilling rig.
30^{†}	Natchitoches Historic District	Natchitoches Historic District	April 16, 1984 (#74000928)	Natchitoches; 31°45′16″N 93°05′32″W	Natchitoches	Natchitoches is the oldest permanent settlement in the lower Mississippi River Valley, founded by the French in 1714 (four years before New Orleans).
31	New Orleans Cotton Exchange Building	New Orleans Cotton Exchange Building	December 22, 1977 (#77000675)	New Orleans; 29°57′09″N 90°04′16″W	Orleans	
32	Oak Alley Plantation	Oak Alley Plantation	December 2, 1974 (#74002187)	Vacherie; 30°00′15″N 90°46′33″W	St. James	
33	Old Louisiana State Capitol	Old Louisiana State Capitol	May 30, 1974 (#73000862)	Baton Rouge; 30°26′48″N 91°11′21″W	East Baton Rouge	Innovatively designed by architect James H. Dakin, it is "Castellated Gothic".
34	Parlange Plantation House	Parlange Plantation House	May 30, 1974 (#70000258)	Mix; 30°37′49″N 91°29′10″W	Pointe Coupee	
35	Pontalba Buildings	Pontalba Buildings	May 30, 1974 (#74000934)	New Orleans; 29°57′27″N 90°03′44″W	Orleans	
36	Port Hudson	Port Hudson	May 30, 1974 (#74002349)	Port Hudson; 30°41′36″N 91°16′33″W	East Feliciana	Port Hudson State Historic Site, an American Civil War battleground, the last Confederate stronghold on the Mississippi River. The Port Hudson National Cemetery is approximately six miles south, in East Baton Rouge Parish.
37	Poverty Point National Monument	Poverty Point National Monument	April 15, 1970 (#66000382)	Delhi; 32°38′12″N 91°24′41″W	West Carroll	
38	The Presbytere	The Presbytere	April 15, 1970 (#70000257)	New Orleans; 29°57′28″N 90°03′48″W	Orleans	Iconic building on Jackson Square, planned in the 1790s during the Spanish colonial era as the twin of the Cabildo. Second floor wasn't completed until 1813, during early statehood, with the third floor added in the 1840s. Since 1911, the Presbytere has belonged to the Louisiana State Museum.
39^{†}	Jean Pierre Emmanuel Prud'homme Oakland Plantation	Jean Pierre Emmanuel Prud'homme Oakland Plantation	January 3, 2001 (#79001073)	Natchez; 31°39′54″N 93°00′12″W	Natchitoches	
40^{†}	Rosedown Plantation	Rosedown Plantation	April 5, 2005 (#01000765)	St. Francisville; 30°47′46″N 91°22′15″W	West Feliciana	
41	Saint Alphonsus Church	Saint Alphonsus Church	June 19, 1996 (#73000872)	New Orleans; 29°55′50″N 90°04′25″W	Orleans	
42	St. Charles Streetcar Line	St. Charles Streetcar Line	August 25, 2014 (#73000873)	New Orleans; 29°55′38″N 90°05′40″W	Orleans	Most extensive streetcar line in the country; oldest continuously operated light-rail line in the world
43	St. Mary's Assumption Church	St. Mary's Assumption Church	May 30, 1974 (#71000361)	New Orleans; 29°55′48″N 90°04′27″W	Orleans	
44	St. Patrick's Church	St. Patrick's Church	May 30, 1974 (#74000936)	New Orleans; 29°56′48″N 90°04′12″W	Orleans	
45	San Francisco Plantation House	San Francisco Plantation House	May 30, 1974 (#74002186)	Reserve; 30°02′51″N 90°36′20″W	St. John the Baptist	
46	Shadows-on-the-Teche	Shadows-on-the-Teche	May 30, 1970 (#72000553)	New Iberia; 30°00′16″N 91°48′56″W	Iberia	The Greek Revival home was completed in 1834 on the Bayou Teche by wealthy planters David and Mary Weeks, within the town of New Iberia. It remained in the Weeks family until 1958, when William Weeks Hall died and donated the building to the National Trust for Historic Preservation. Open for tours.
47	Shreveport Municipal Memorial Auditorium	Shreveport Municipal Memorial Auditorium	October 6, 2008 (#91000624)	Shreveport; 32°30′29″N 93°45′11″W	Caddo	
48	Shreveport Water Works Company, Pump Station	Shreveport Water Works Company, Pump Station	December 17, 1982 (#80001707)	Shreveport; 32°31′04″N 93°45′26″W	Caddo	An engineering landmark.
49	United States Customhouse	United States Customhouse	December 2, 1974 (#74000938)	New Orleans; 29°57′05″N 90°03′59″W	Orleans	
50	United States Court of Appeals—Fifth Circuit	United States Court of Appeals—Fifth Circuit	July 21, 2015 (#74000937)	New Orleans; 29°56′52″N 90°04′45″W	Orleans	1909 courthouse was where many key court cases brought during the Civil Rights Movement were decided
51	United States Mint, New Orleans Branch	United States Mint, New Orleans Branch	May 15, 1975 (#73000875)	New Orleans; 29°57′41″N 90°03′26″W	Orleans	Minted both gold and silver coinage during the antebellum years of the 19th century; also served briefly as a C.S.A. mint.
52	Old Ursuline Convent	Old Ursuline Convent	October 9, 1960 (#66000376)	New Orleans; 29°57′39″N 90°03′39″W	Orleans	Convent established early in the colonial era by Ursuline nuns and New Orleans' oldest-surviving French Colonial building (1752).
53^{†}	Vieux Carre Historic District	Vieux Carre Historic District	December 21, 1965 (#66000377)	New Orleans; 29°57′31″N 90°03′54″W	Orleans	Meaning "Old Square," the original 18th-century town of New Orleans, laid out in a grid plan and known today as the French Quarter.
54	Edward Douglass White House	Edward Douglass White House	December 8, 1976 (#76000964)	Thibodaux; 29°49′27″N 90°54′41″W	Lafourche	Home of Edward Douglass White.

== Former National Historic Landmarks ==
	Landmark name	Image	Date designated	Date withdrawn	Locality	Parish	Description
1	U.S.S. Cabot	U.S.S. Cabot	June 29, 1990 (#90000334)	August 7, 2001	New Orleans		Commissioned during 1943, The USS Cabot (CVL-28/AVT-3) was an Independence-class aircraft carrier in the United States Navy. From 1967 to 1989, it was used by the Spanish navy as the Dédalo. A New Orleans–based museum foundation purchased the ship for restoration during 1990, but was unable to obtain sufficient funding. The Cabot was eventually scrapped and withdrawn as a Landmark on August 7, 2001.
2	Kate Chopin House	Kate Chopin House	April 19, 1993 (#93001601)	December 28, 2015	Cloutierville; 31°32′20″N 92°55′02″W	Natchitoches	Home of Kate Chopin, author of The Awakening, source for her writings on bayou life. It was destroyed by fire in 2008.
3	DELUGE (Firefighting Tug)	DELUGE (Firefighting Tug)	June 30, 1989 (#89001427)	December 11, 2023	New Orleans; 29°57′15″N 90°03′18″W	Orleans	The DELUGE, a fireboat that served the Port of New Orleans, is an example of large fireboats found in major ports during the 1920s.

== National Park Service areas in Louisiana ==
National Historic Sites and other National Park Service areas in Louisiana are:

- Cane River Creole National Historical Park
- Chalmette National Cemetery
- El Camino Real de los Tejas National Historic Trail
- Jean Lafitte National Historical Park and Preserve
- New Orleans Jazz National Historical Park
- Poverty Point National Monument
- Vicksburg National Military Park (also in Mississippi)

Poverty Point National Monument is listed as a National Park Service area although title for the site has not been transferred from Louisiana to the federal government. Otherwise, excepting the El Camino Real de los Tejas trail, these are federally owned sites and enjoy greater protection than most National Historic Landmarks.

== See also ==
- List of National Historic Landmarks by state
- National Register of Historic Places listings in Louisiana
- Historic preservation
- History of Louisiana
