= Narcisse Prudhomme Plantation =

Historic house in Louisiana, United States

- U.S. National Register of Historic Places
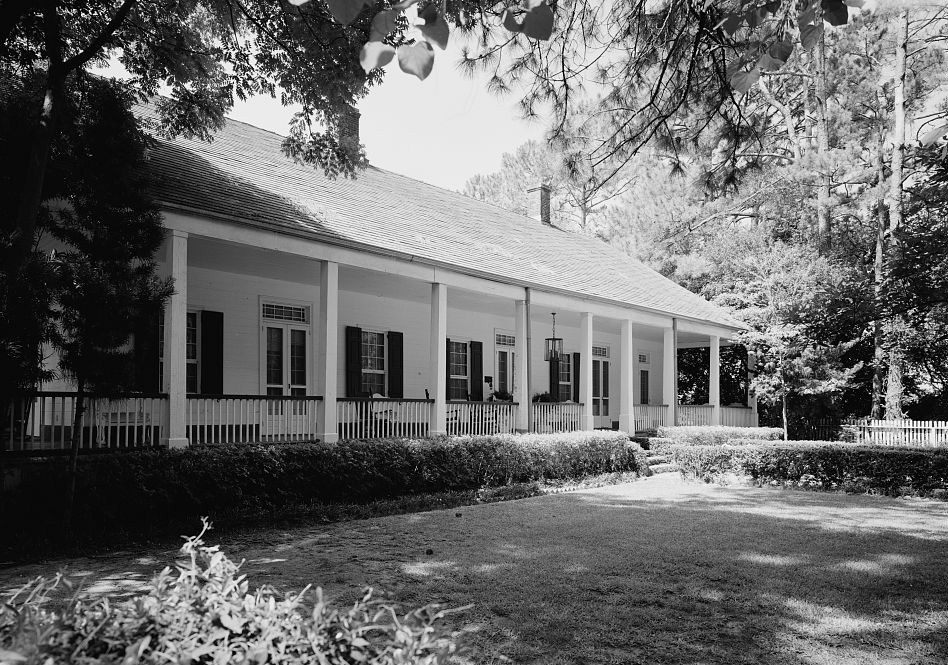
- Location: 4055 State Highway 494, Bermuda, Natchitoches Parish, Louisiana
- Coordinates: 31°40′11″N 93°00′40″W
- Built: c.1820
- Architectural style: Creole, Greek Revival, French Colonial
- NRHP reference No.: 76000966
- Added to NRHP: July 13, 1976

Narcisse Prudhomme Plantation, also known as Narcisse Prud'homme Plantation, Beau Fort Plantation, and St. Charles Plantation, is a historic planation house and a former plantation, located in the unincorporated community of Bermuda, Louisiana near the village of Natchez. It is one of the oldest plantations in the Cane River National Heritage Area.

It has been listed on the National Register of Historic Places since July 13, 1976, for its architectural significance.

== History ==
The first known owner of the plantation is Louis Barthelemy Rachal, and the plantation house is thought to have been built sometime between 1790 and 1821. The name "Beau Fort" is derived from an oral history about the land the plantation occupies once being the site of an early French fort.

The second owner of the plantation house was Louis Narcisse Prud'homme (1788–1844) and his wife Marie Theresa Elizabeth (née Métoyer). Prud'homme's father owned the Oakland Plantation and were the first to grow cotton in the area. Prud'homme's daughter Marie Clarisse Prud'homme (1817–1908) was married to Charles Emile Sompayrac (1813–1878) and they owned the Cherokee Plantation.

== Architecture ==
The architecture of the Narcisse Prudhomme Plantation house is Creole influenced, but it is not designed as a typical Creole cabin. The original rooms have 12 foot tall ceilings with Greek Revival molding. The house also has French Colonial architectural features such as a bousillage walls, a gable roof, french doors, a front gallery space, the floor plan layout, and interior chimneys. The framing of the house is made with cypress wood.

The plantation house was nicknamed "Luclora". Remodels to the house occurred in 1937 with exterior changes; and in 1949 with a wing of the house added.

Located nearby is Oaklawn Plantation, Cherokee Plantation, and Cedar Bend Plantation.

== See also ==
- List of plantations in Louisiana
- National Register of Historic Places listings in Natchitoches Parish, Louisiana
