= National Register of Historic Places listings in Natchitoches Parish, Louisiana =

Location of Natchitoches Parish in Louisiana

This is a list of the National Register of Historic Places listings in Natchitoches Parish, Louisiana.

This is intended to be a complete list of the properties and districts on the National Register of Historic Places in Natchitoches Parish, Louisiana, United States. The locations of National Register properties and districts for which the latitude and longitude coordinates are included below, may be seen in a map.

There are 39 properties and districts listed on the National Register in the parish, including 5 National Historic Landmarks. One property was once listed, but has been removed.

This National Park Service list is complete through NPS recent listings posted December 12, 2025.

== Current listings ==
	Name on the Register	Image	Date listed	Location	City or town	Description
1	Badin-Roque House	Badin-Roque House	June 6, 1980 (#80001739)	Along LA 484, about 6.6 miles (10.6 km) southeast of Natchez; 31°36′07″N 92°58′24″W	Natchez vicinity	
2	Briarwood	Briarwood	November 8, 2016 (#16000761)	216 Caroline Dorman Road; 32°07′49″N 92°59′04″W	Saline vicinity	Located near Saline, Bienville Parish
3	Cane River Creole National Historical Park	Cane River Creole National Historical Park	November 2, 1994 (#01000226)	4386 Louisiana Highway 494; 31°59′56″N 93°00′10″W	Natchez vicinity	
4	Carnahan Store	Carnahan Store	November 7, 1995 (#95001243)	Main St. (Louisiana Highway 495); 31°32′39″N 92°54′58″W	Cloutierville	
5	Caspiana Plantation Store	Caspiana Plantation Store	June 5, 1992 (#92000583)	1300 Texas St. 31°46′13″N 93°05′47″W	Natchitoches	
6	Cedar Bend Plantation		July 14, 1988 (#88001049)	Louisiana Highway 119; 31°40′55″N 93°00′40″W	Natchez vicinity	
7	Cherokee Plantation	Cherokee Plantation	August 14, 1973 (#73000869)	Southeast of Natchitoches on Cane River Rd. 31°41′20″N 93°02′17″W	Natchitoches vicinity	
8	Church of St. Anne	Church of St. Anne	October 28, 1994 (#94001271)	Southwestern corner of the junction of Louisiana Highway 485 and Bloss Moore Rd. 31°47′08″N 93°17′09″W	Allen	
9	City Hotel	City Hotel	April 22, 1993 (#93000317)	Junction of Louisiana Highway 120 and Rains Ave. 31°44′21″N 93°23′43″W	Marthaville	
10	Alexis Cloutier House	Alexis Cloutier House	December 31, 1974 (#74000927)	Main St. 31°32′27″N 92°55′04″W	Cloutierville	Also known as the Kate Chopin House. Destroyed by fire in 2008. See "Kate Chopin House" in "Former listings" below.
11	Drake's Salt Works Archaeological District		September 22, 2022 (#100008174)	Address Restricted	Goldonna vicinity	
12	Fish Hatchery 2 Site		August 3, 2005 (#05000808)	Address Restricted	Natchitoches	
13	Flora Commissary	Flora Commissary	February 1, 2011 (#10001194)	Louisiana Highway 120, approximately ¼ mile west of Louisiana Highway 478; 31°36′49″N 93°06′02″W	Flora	
14	Fredericks Site		June 22, 2000 (#00000307)	Address Restricted	Clarence	
15	Guy House	Guy House	February 11, 1988 (#88000103)	309 Pine Street; 31°45′16″N 93°05′24″W	Natchitoches	Moved in 2002 from original location south of Mansfield, DeSoto Parish.
16	Jones House	Jones House	September 9, 1993 (#93000937)	Louisiana Highway 484 along Cane River Lake; 31°35′00″N 92°57′41″W	Melrose	
17	Jerry Jones House		March 6, 2002 (#02000124)	Louisiana Highway 484; 31°36′22″N 92°59′08″W	Melrose	
18	John Carroll Jones House		April 6, 2000 (#00000329)	473 Louisiana Highway 484; 31°38′30″N 93°00′38″W	Natchez vicinity	
19	Keegan House	Keegan House	March 1, 1990 (#90000342)	225 Williams Ave. 31°45′18″N 93°05′03″W	Natchitoches	
20	Keegan House	Keegan House	July 14, 1995 (#95000853)	143 Chaplin Loop; 31°41′35″N 93°18′13″W	Robeline	
21	Kisatchie School		October 11, 2022 (#100008286)	1811 LA 118 West; 31°27′57″N 93°25′47″W	Provencal vicinity	
21	Los Adaes	Los Adaes	June 7, 1978 (#78001427)	Northeast of Robeline off Louisiana Highway 6; also ½ mile north of Louisiana Highway 6 north of Robeline; 31°42′30″N 93°17′34″W	Robeline vicinity	Second set of addresses represents a boundary increase of November 4, 1993
22	Magnolia Plantation	Magnolia Plantation	March 7, 1979 (#79001071)	5487 Louisiana Highway 119; 31°32′59″N 92°56′26″W	Derry	
23	Maison De Marie Therese	Maison De Marie Therese	December 6, 1979 (#79001070)	1 mile northwest of Bermuda; 31°40′26″N 93°01′06″W	Bermuda	
24	Melrose Plantation	Melrose Plantation	June 13, 1972 (#72000556)	Louisiana Highway 119 off Louisiana Highway 493; 31°36′00″N 92°58′01″W	Melrose	
25	Narcisse Prudhomme Plantation	Narcisse Prudhomme Plantation	July 13, 1976 (#76000966)	Southeast of Natchitoches on Cane River Rd. 31°40′11″N 93°00′36″W	Bermuda, Louisiana	Also known as Beau Fort
26	Natchitoches Historic District	Natchitoches Historic District	June 5, 1974 (#74000928)	Roughly bounded by 2nd, 4th, Jefferson, and Parie Sts., and Williams and College Aves. 31°45′39″N 93°04′03″W	Natchitoches	Includes the Basilica of the Immaculate Conception as a contributing property.
27	Normal Hill Historic District	Normal Hill Historic District	January 15, 1980 (#80001741)	Northwestern State University campus 31°45′03″N 93°05′33″W	Natchitoches	
28	Northwestern State University Historic District	Northwestern State University Historic District	June 19, 2014 (#14000313)	Roughly bounded by University Pkw., Harry Turpin Stadium, Fournet Quad., Cadwell & Sam Sibley Drs., Central Ave. 31°45′00″N 93°05′50″W	Natchitoches	May be expansion of Normal Hill HD
29	Oaklawn Plantation	Oaklawn Plantation	March 28, 1979 (#79001072)	East of Natchez on Louisiana Highway 494; 31°40′11″N 93°00′42″W	Natchez vicinity	
30	President's Home, Northwestern State University	President's Home, Northwestern State University	July 19, 1984 (#84001332)	College Ave. 31°45′05″N 93°05′36″W	Natchitoches	
31	Oakland Plantation	Oakland Plantation	August 29, 1979 (#79001073)	4386 Louisiana Highway 494; 31°39′54″N 93°00′12″W	Natchez vicinity	Also known as the Jean Pierre Emmanuel Prud'homme Plantation.
32	Robeline Methodist Church	Robeline Methodist Church	February 11, 1988 (#88000113)	Texas St., Louisiana Highway 6; 31°41′26″N 93°18′16″W	Robeline	
33	St. Augustine Catholic Church and Cemetery	St. Augustine Catholic Church and Cemetery	September 24, 2014 (#14000679)	2262 Louisiana Highway 484; 31°35′37″N 92°58′22″W	Natchez vicinity	
34	St. Matthew High School	St. Matthew High School	January 20, 2005 (#04001516)	2552 Louisiana Highway 119; 31°37′30″N 92°59′18″W	Melrose	
35	Southern Cotton Oil Mill	Southern Cotton Oil Mill	July 13, 2017 (#100001312)	110 Mill St. 31°44′53″N 93°05′12″W	Natchitoches	
36	Texas and Pacific Railroad Depot	Texas and Pacific Railroad Depot	May 14, 1987 (#87000732)	6th St. 31°45′40″N 93°05′38″W	Natchitoches	
37	Jacquitte Vallery Cabin	Jacquitte Vallery Cabin	June 25, 2018 (#100002580)	382 Vallery Rd. 31°29′45″N 92°54′32″W	Chopin	
38	Women's Gymnasium, Northwestern State University	Women's Gymnasium, Northwestern State University	June 21, 1984 (#84001335)	College Ave. 31°45′08″N 93°05′42″W	Natchitoches	

== Former listings ==
	Name on the Register	Image	Date listed	Date removed	Location	City or town	Description
1	Kate Chopin House	Kate Chopin House	April 19, 1993 (#93001601)	December 28, 2015	Main St. (Louisiana Highway 1); 31°32′26″N 92°55′02″W	Cloutierville	Destroyed by fire in 2008.

== See also ==
- List of National Historic Landmarks in Louisiana
- National Register of Historic Places listings in Louisiana
- Isle Brevelle
- Anne des Cadeaux
