= Badin-Roque House =

Historic house in Louisiana, United States

- U.S. National Register of Historic Places
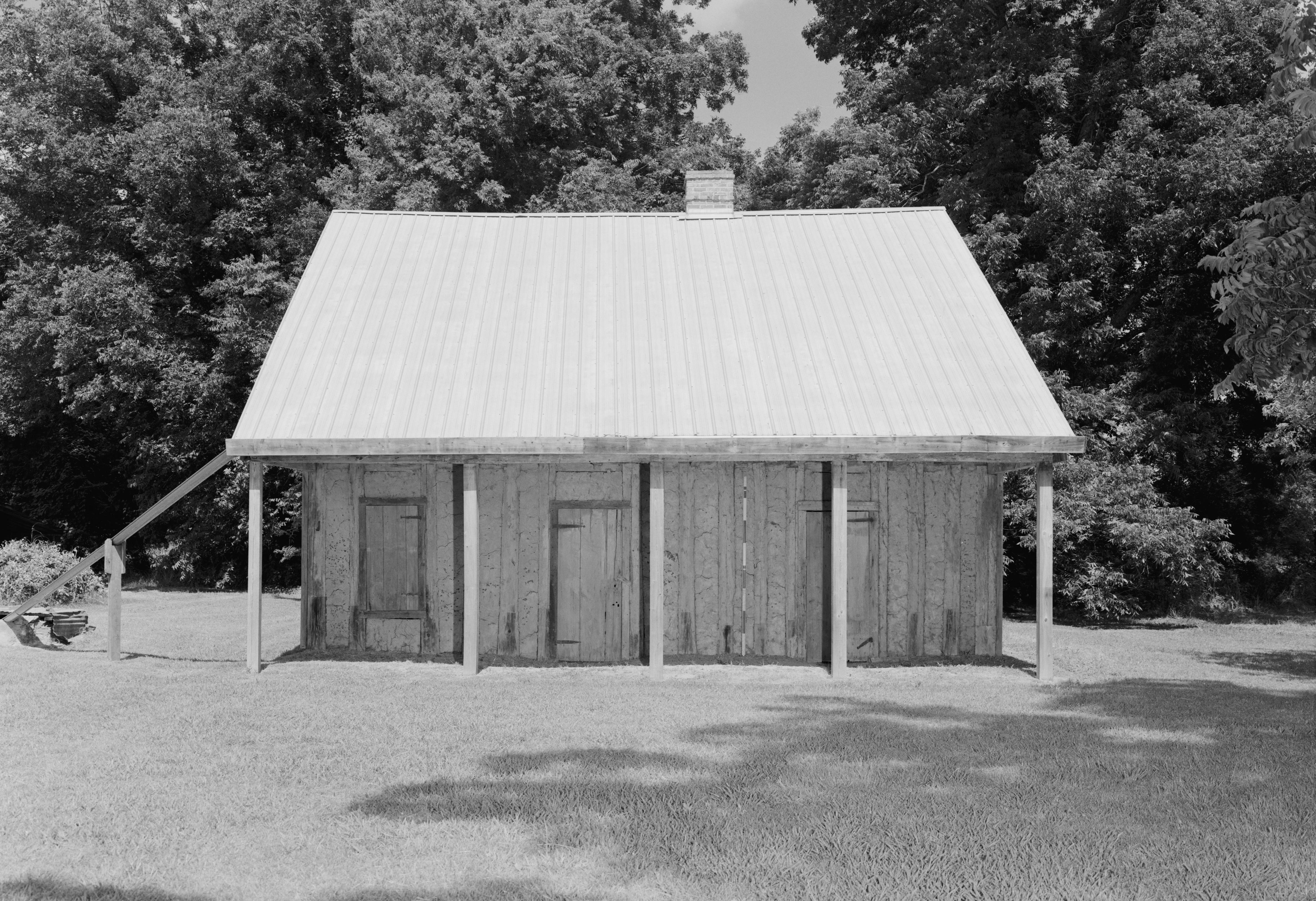

- Location within Louisiana Location within the United States
- Interactive map showing the location of Badin-Roque House
- Location: Along LA 484, about 6.6 miles (10.6 km) southeast of Natchez
- Nearest city: Natchez, Louisiana
- Coordinates: 31°36′07″N 92°58′24″W
- Area: 0.1 acres (0.040 ha)
- Built: 1830s
- NRHP reference No.: 80001739
- Added to NRHP: June 6, 1980

The Badin-Roque House is a historic house located along Louisiana Highway 484, about 6.6 miles (10.6 km) southeast of Natchez in the community of Isle Brevelle.

The house was listed on the National Register of Historic Places on June 6, 1980.

== History ==
Originally built in the early nineteenth century, it is a Poteaux-en-terre French Creole cottage with bousillage construction walls. Several alterations were made in the 1830s when a beaded tongue and groove ceiling was added, along with board and batten fenestration, and in 1850, when it was added the actual pitched roof and siding.

First owner of land where the house is standing was Francois Frederic, who sold it to the free Creole of color, Augustin Metoyer in 1827. In 1840, Augustin Metoyer had his lands and buildings appraised and donated the property to his son Jean Baptiste Augustin Metoyer Jr.

In 1855, the parcel comprising the house was sold to Sigmund Kisffy, who sold it to the Reverend Auguste Marie Martin in 1856. Bishop Martin used the house as a mission convent for the Daughters of the Cross, a French order of teaching nuns. Bishop Martin sold the property to Jean Napoleon Burdin in 1859. After the death of Burdin, the property was acquired by George Lahaye in 1866, who sold it to Gristoffe Bussi, an Italian baker, in 1867. The property was acquired at an unknown date by Norbert Badin, a distant relative to Augustin Metoyer, and the property passed to his daughter Zeline Badin Roque in 1927. After her death, the house was acquired by Edward Antee, from which the property was acquired by the St. Augustine Historical Society in 1979.

== See also ==
- National Register of Historic Places listings in Natchitoches Parish, Louisiana
- Isle Brevelle
