= Cane River Lake =

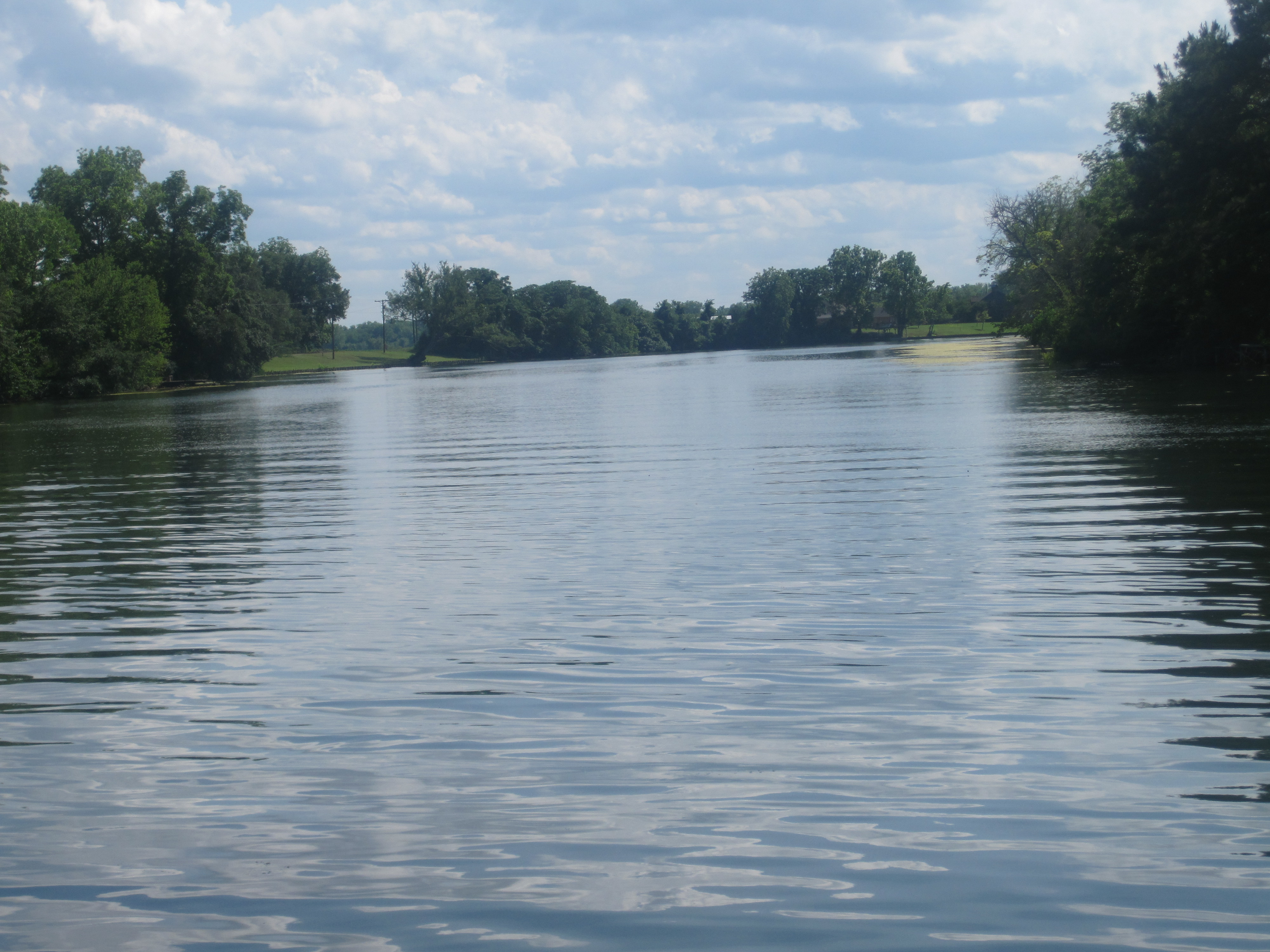
- Cane River Lake near Melrose Plantation in south Natchitoches Parish

- Location within Louisiana Location within the United States
- Location: Natchitoches Parish, Louisiana
- Coordinates: 31°38′10.74″N 93°0′13.96″W
- Type: oxbow lake
- Basin countries: United States
- Max. length: c. 35 mi (56 km)
- Max. width: 100 ft (30 m)
- Average depth: 8 ft (2.4 m)
- Max. depth: 15 ft (4.6 m)
- Settlements: Natchitoches, Natchez, Bermuda, Melrose

Cane River Lake (French: Lac de la rivière aux Cannes) is a 35 mi (56 km) oxbow lake formed from a portion of the Red River in Natchitoches Parish, Louisiana, United States. It runs throughout the Natchitoches' historic district to the south and is famous for the numerous plantations, particularly Melrose being located on or near its banks.

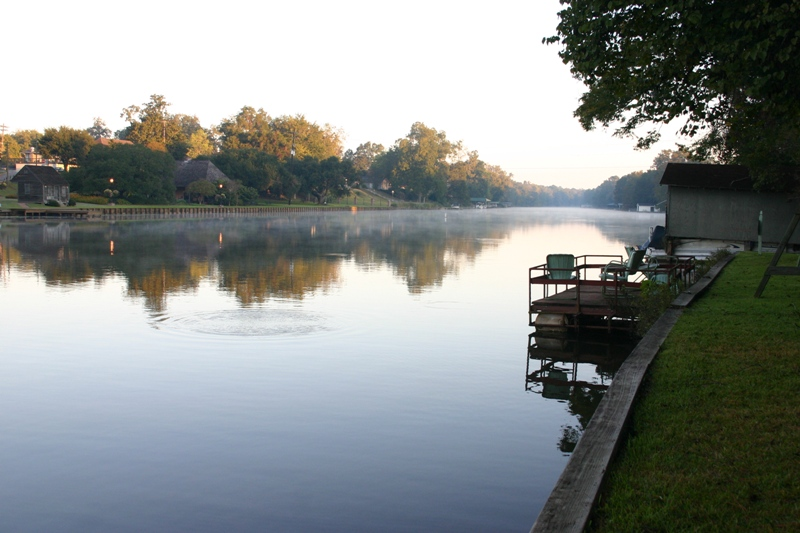
Cane River Lake in Natchitoches, Louisiana

The lake was widely publicized between 1966 and 1979 by the nationally known outdoorsman Grits Gresham, host (with Curt Gowdy) of ABC's The American Sportsman and author of numerous books and columns on hunting, fishing, and guns.

The American historian, Henry C. Dethloff, grew up on Cane River and as a youth swam the entire width of the stream underwater.

== See also ==
- Cane River National Heritage Area
- Cane River Creole National Historical Park
- Marathon Rowing Championship
