= Cane River National Heritage Area =

United States National Heritage Area in Louisiana

The Cane River National Heritage Area is a United States National Heritage Area in the state of Louisiana. The heritage area is known for plantations featuring Creole architecture, as well as numerous other sites that preserve the multi-cultural history of the area. The heritage area includes the town of Natchitoches, Louisiana and its national historic district. Founded in 1714, it is the oldest community in the territory covered by the Louisiana Purchase. Cane River Creole National Historical Park, including areas of Magnolia and Oakland plantations, also is within the heritage area.

The park and the St. Augustine Parish (Isle Brevelle) Church in Natchez have been included as featured destinations on the state's Louisiana African American Heritage Trail.

The roughly 116,000 acres (470 km^{2}) Cane River National Heritage Area begins just south of Natchitoches and extends south and west for about 35 miles (56 kilometers along Cane River Lake and Interstate 49 to Monette's Ferry. Other sites in the heritage area include the Kate Chopin House and the state historic sites of Los Adaes State Historic Site, Fort Jesup, and Fort St. Jean Baptiste State Historic Site.

== See also ==
- Isle Brevelle
- Anne des Cadeaux
- St. Augustine Catholic Church and Cemetery (Natchez, Louisiana)
- Los Adaes
- Bayou Brevelle
- Cane River
- Adai Caddo Indians of Louisiana
