= Marathon Rowing Championship =

The Marathon Rowing Championship is a continuous 42.195 kilometres (26.219 mi) rowing regatta on the Cane River Lake in Natchitoches, Louisiana. Northwestern State University is the official host of the regatta. The Marathon begins near the Melrose Plantation and ends at Front Street in Natchitoches. The regatta is open to all sculling and sweep-oar rowing boats. On the day of the Marathon, the Cane River is open only to competitors.

The regatta is much longer than most head races, but shorter than the 50 kilometres (31 mi) Boston Rowing Marathon. Normally, the races with the longest distance that competitive crews enter are called head races (for example the Head of the Charles) and are usually around 5 kilometres (3.1 mi) long. The majority of crews do not even practice on bodies of water that allow them to row 42.195 kilometres (26.219 mi) without stopping and turning around (usually due to lake size or the presence of a river dam or lock).

The Marathon Rowing Championship did not take place in 2010 or 2011 due to low water during an extreme regional drought.

The record time for this event is 2 hours, 31 minutes, 20 seconds set in 2008. A more typical time it takes to complete the course is 3 to 4 hours.
