= Robert M. Harling III =

American writer, producer and film director

- Born: November 12, 1951 (age 74); Dothan, Alabama
- Years active: 1987–present

Robert M. Harling III (born November 12, 1951) is an American writer, producer and film director.

== Biography ==
=== Early life ===
Harling was born in 1951 in Dothan, Alabama, one of three children of Robert M. Harling Jr (1923–2019) and Margaret Jones Harling (1923–2013). He graduated from Northwestern State University in Natchitoches, Louisiana and obtained a Juris Doctor from Tulane University Law School in New Orleans. While in law school, he sang in a band which performed in New Orleans on weekends.

=== Career ===
Following graduation from law school, Harling moved to New York to pursue an acting career. He auditioned for bit parts in plays and television commercials as well as working as a ticket seller for Broadway shows.

After the death of his younger sister, Susan, in 1985 due to diabetes, Harling wrote a short story and adapted it into the play Steel Magnolias, which was produced off-Broadway in 1987 to great acclaim and was translated into 17 languages.

Harling also wrote the screenplay for the film version of the play that was produced in 1989. He played a small role in the film as a minister.

Harling wrote more screenplays: Soapdish (1991), The First Wives Club (1996), and Laws of Attraction (2004); he also worked as an uncredited script doctor on a number of films. Harling also wrote and directed the sequel to Terms of Endearment titled The Evening Star (1996).

In the spring of 2012, he served as writer and producer of the TV show GCB. In the same year, it was reported that Harling was adapting Soapdish into a musical.

=== Personal life ===
He is Presbyterian and openly gay. He owns the Oaklawn Plantation in Natchitoches, Louisiana.

== Filmography ==
=== Writer ===
- 1989 Steel Magnolias
- 1990 Steel Magnolias (TV pilot)
- 1991 Soapdish
- 1992 Coiffure pour dames
- 1996 The First Wives Club
- 1996 The Evening Star
- 2004 Laws of Attraction
- 2012 GCB

=== Producer ===
- 1997 A Smile Like Yours
- 2012 GCB

=== Director ===
- 1996 The Evening Star
