= Cloutierville, Louisiana =

Unincorporated community in Louisiana, US

Coordinates: 31°32′36″N 92°55′06″W

Cloutierville
- unincorporated community
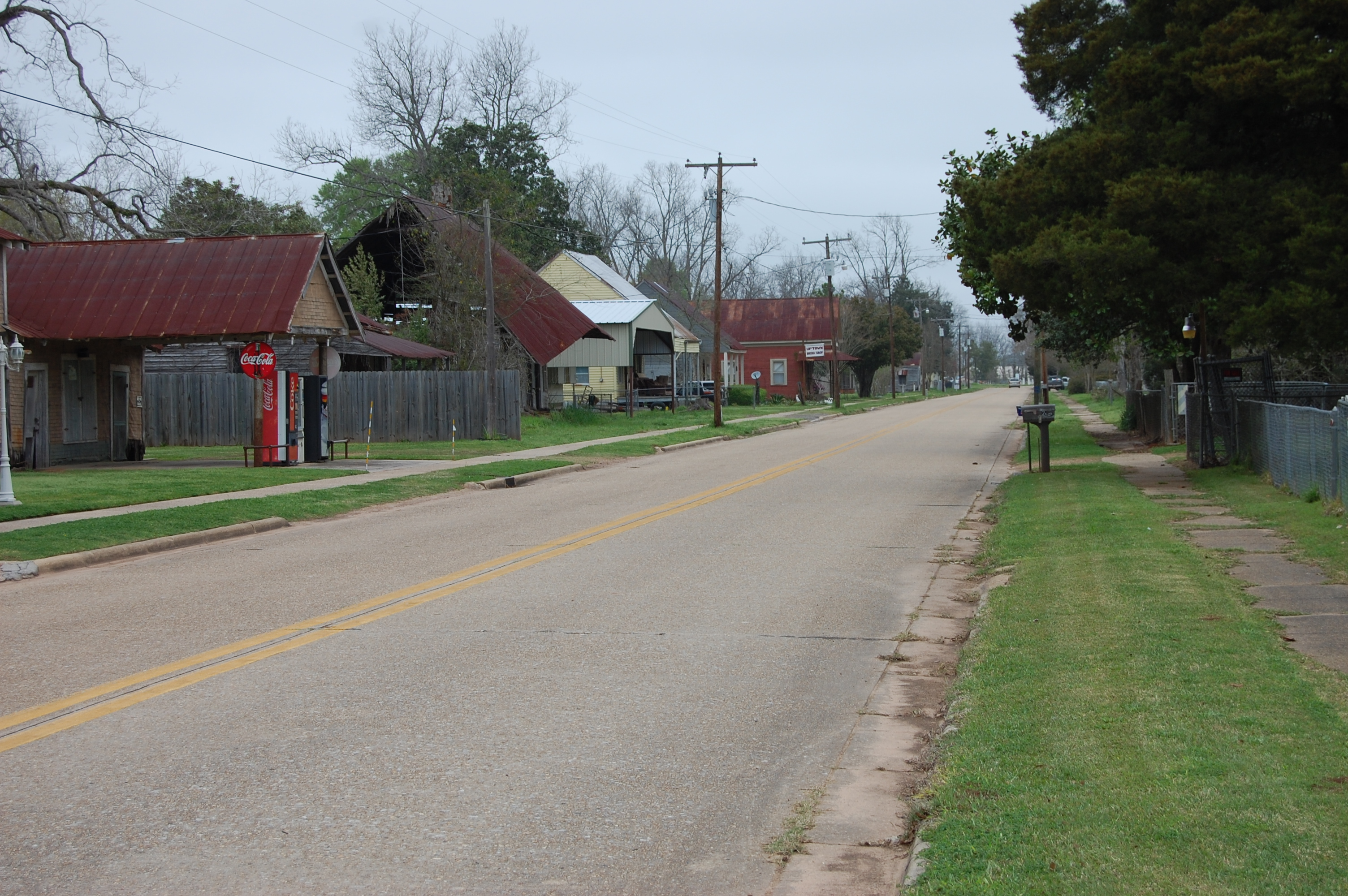
- Louisiana Route 495 through Cloutierville
- Interactive map of Cloutierville
- Country: United States
- State: Louisiana
- Parish: Natchitoches
- Established: 1822
- Time zone: UTC-6 (CST)
  - Summer (DST): UTC-5 (CDT)
- ZIP code: 71416
- Area code: 318

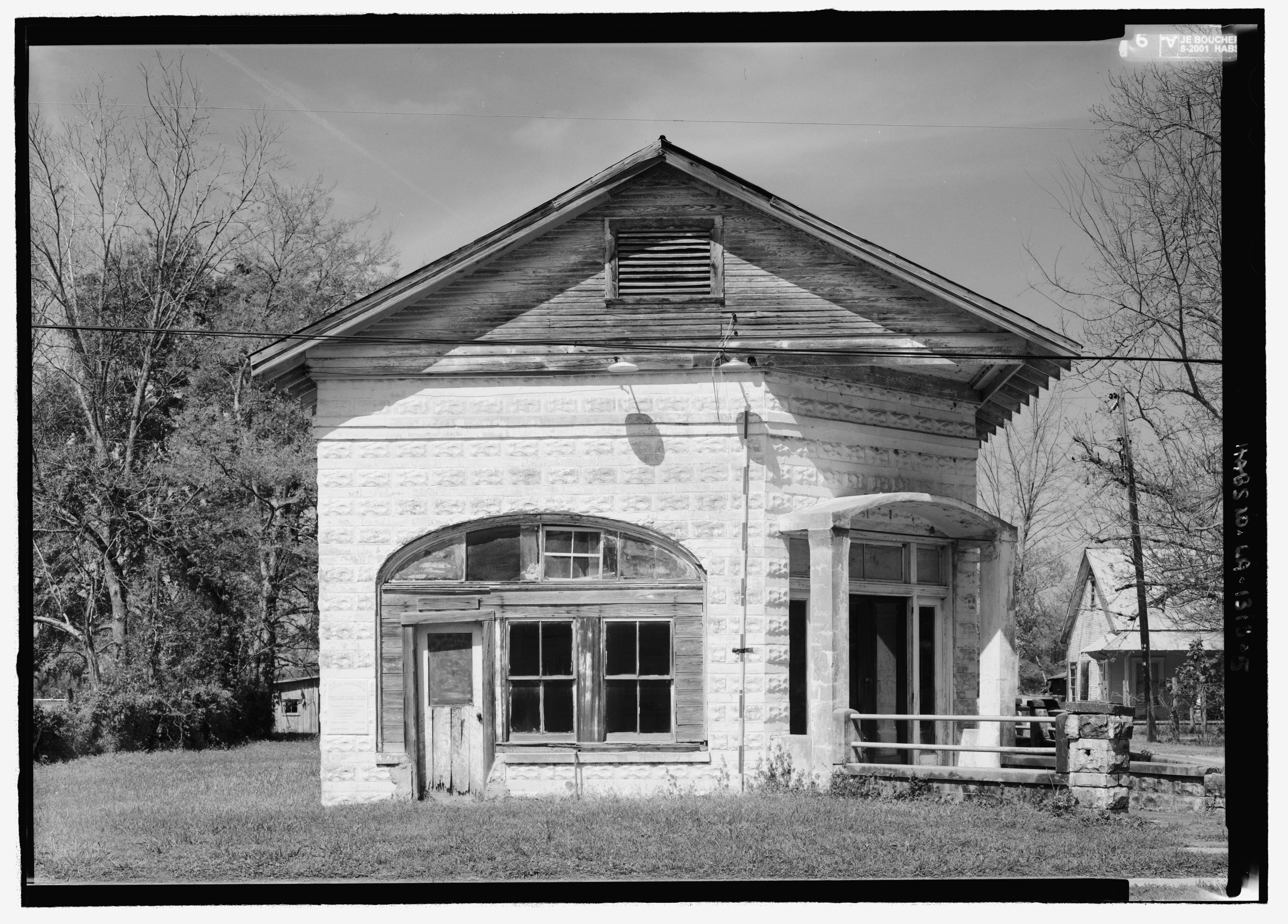
Bank of Cloutierville building.

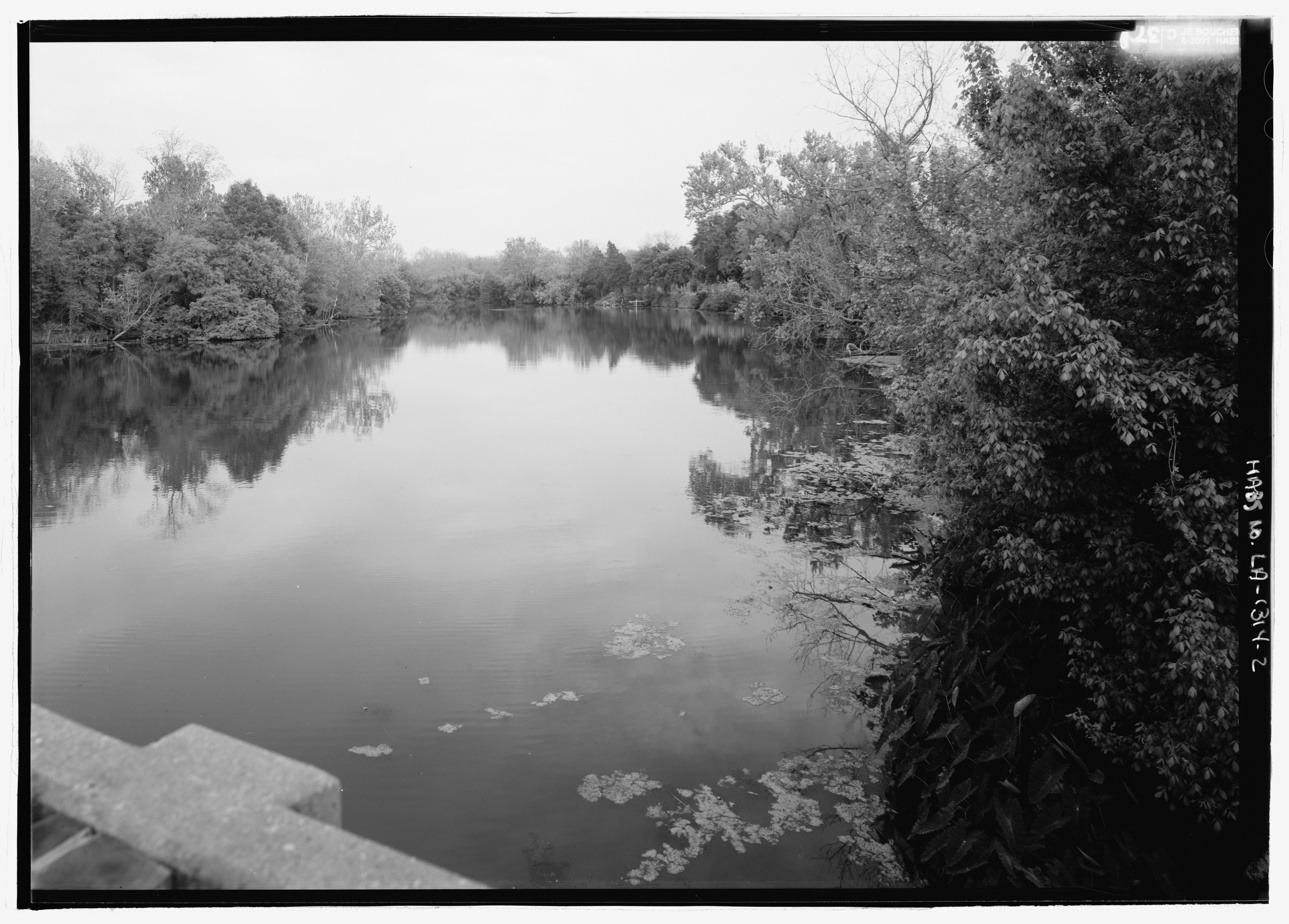
Cane River in Cloutierville.

Cloutierville is an unincorporated community in Natchitoches Parish, Louisiana, United States. It lies approximately 20 miles (32 km) south of the city of Natchitoches on the Cane River. The community is part of the Natchitoches Micropolitan Statistical Area, off exit 119 of Interstate 49.

This is a homeland of many multiracial Louisiana Creole people. It is in the NPS Cane River National Heritage Area.

== History ==
The town was built on the plantation of Alexis Cloutier and incorporated in 1822.

The plantation house was later owned by Kate Chopin. Chopin's former home was open to the public as the Bayou Folk Museum, before its destruction by fire in 2008.

The historic wooden St. John the Baptist Catholic Church and its cemetery are located in Cloutierville.

== Education ==
The community is served by Natchitoches Parish School Board.

== See also ==
- Cane River National Heritage Area topics
- National Register of Historic Places listings in Natchitoches Parish, Louisiana
