= Cherokee Plantation (Natchez, Louisiana) =

Historic house in Louisiana, United States

- U.S. National Register of Historic Places
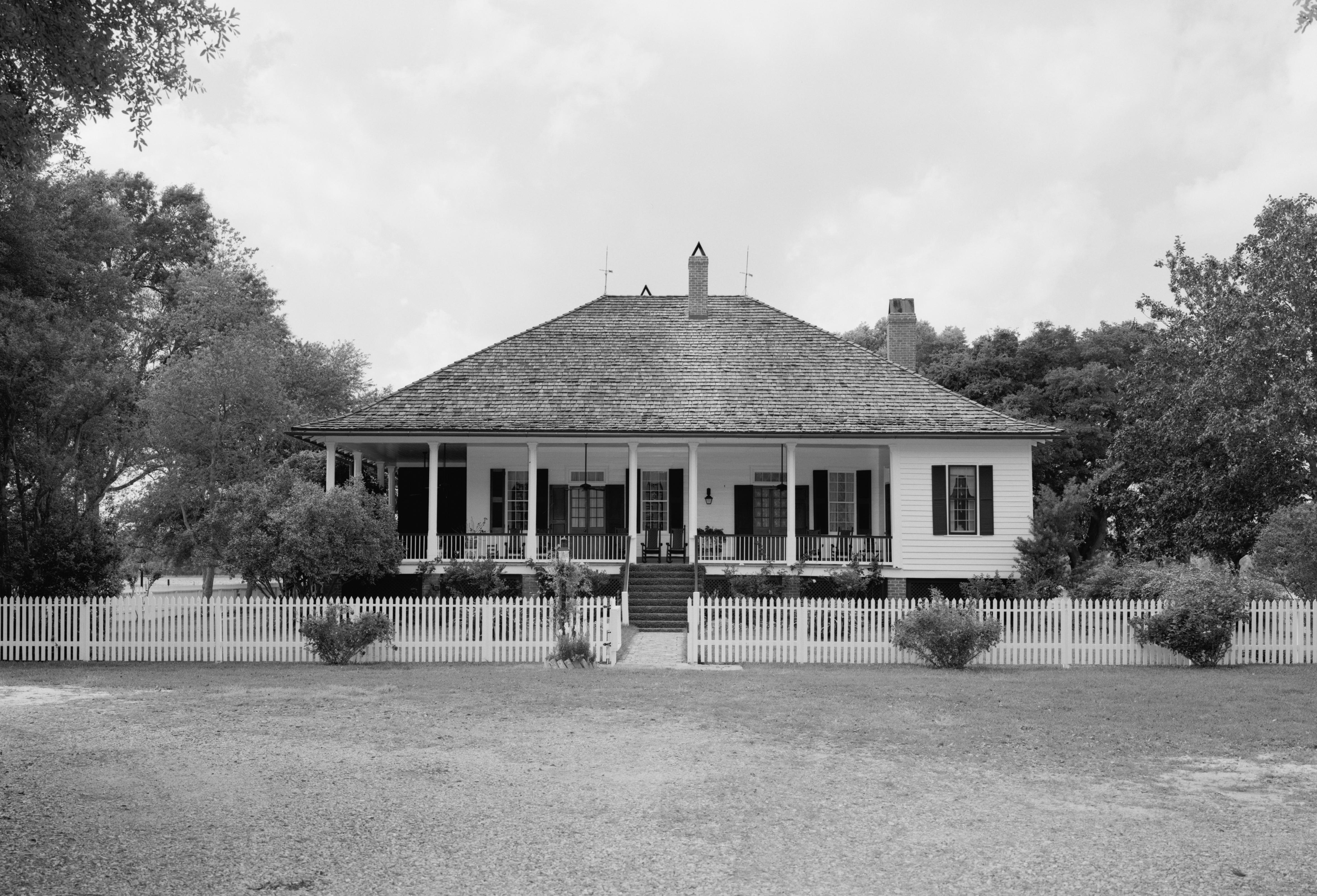
- Location: Cane River Road, Natchez, Natchitoches Parish, Louisiana, U.S.
- Coordinates: 31°41′23″N 93°02′01″W
- Built: c. 1825 to 1849
- Architectural style: French Colonial, Creole architecture
- NRHP reference No.: 73000869
- Added to NRHP: August 14, 1973

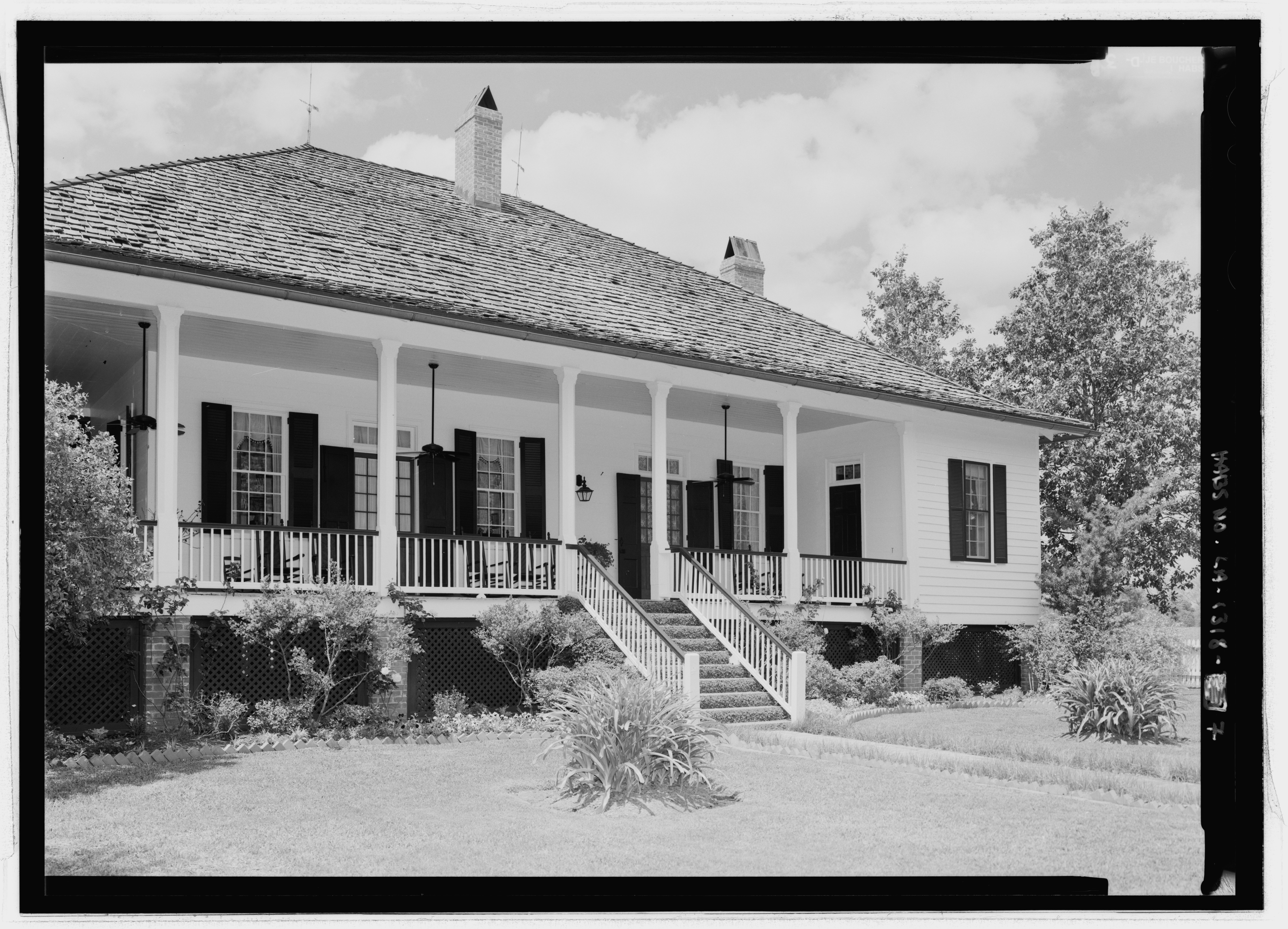

Cherokee Plantation, also known as Emile Sompayrac Place and Murphy Place, is a former plantation and historic plantation house located in Natchez, Louisiana, near the city of Natchitoches. For many years this site was worked and maintained by enslaved African Americans. This location was part of the Côte Joyeuse (English: Joyous Coast) area which was home to the earliest French planters in Louisiana.

It has been listed on the National Register of Historic Places since August 14, 1973, for its architectural and agricultural historical significance.

== Sompayrac family ==
In 1837, Charles Emile Sompayrac (1813–1878) and Marie Clarisse Prud'homme (1817–1908) married. Charles Emile Sompayrac's father was Ambroise Sompayrac (1779–1863), an immigrant from the department of Tarn in France, he owned a horse race track at Natchitoches. Marie Clarisse Prud'homme's father was Louis Narcisse Prud'homme (1788–1844), he was born in Natchitoches and owned the nearby Narcisse Prudhomme Plantation. Prud'homme's paternal grandfather owned Oakland Plantation and were the first to grow cotton in the area.

On December 19, 1839, a few years after marriage, Sompayrac had bought approximately 1133 acres of land to create Cherokee Plantation, included in the sale was a cistern and enslaved people. The land featured large live oak trees and pecan trees.

== Murphy family ==
After Charles Emile Sompayrac death in 1878, his wife started selling off small parcels of land. In 1891, the plantation was sold to Robert Calvert "R.C." Murphy (1842–1936). Much of the existing original furniture came from Murphy in 1891, including a rare 18th century secretaire made in France that was bought from a local neighbor.

After Murphy's death in 1936, the plantation was bequeathed to the Murphy family who maintained it until 1966. Leola Murphy (née Albritton) was one of the last Murphy owner of the plantation and she was worked to find another caretaker which was difficult, eventually she sold the property in 1972 to Robert Calvert Murphy's granddaughter Theodosia (née Murphy) Nolan, and her spouse William Nolan from Arkansas. With the 1972 property sale, the process of preserving and restoring the plantation house started.

== Architecture and property history ==
It is not clear who designed and built the plantation house, however it is estimated to have been built between 1825 and 1849. Many attribute the build date to 1839, since that is when the property was purchased by Sompayrac.

The house is an example of both French Colonial and Creole architecture. It has three patios surrounding the house and the framing was made of 18 hand hewn cypress, this is a skilled trade which is thought to be an accomplishment of the enslaved people that once worked here. The original interior of the house featured six fireplaces, wide planked floors, the walls were made of bousillage, with hand blown window glass. The Cherokee plantation house was not damaged during the American Civil War, between 1861 and 1865.

The name "Cherokee" started as a nickname given by the slaves, for the large hedges of Cherokee roses that were surrounding the property. The complex included 3 old barns, a slave cabin, and a "log crib". The plantation grew primarily cotton, as well as indigo, sugarcane, corn, and tobacco. By 1860, Sompayrac had owned 65 enslaved people.

A duel occurred in the autumn of 1839 on the grounds of Cherokee Plantation. It started as a political argument between the adjutant-general of Louisiana Militia, François Gaiennie, and State Senator Pierre E. Bossier. Gaiennie fired first and missed, then Bossier hit Gaiennie in the heart, killing him instantly. Another eleven men died in the aftermath, as animosities related to the duel continued to play out.

During the filming of the movie Steel Magnolias (1989) in the local area, actress Shirley MacLaine visited the Cherokee Plantation and reported experiencing a paranormal encounter. A similar story of haunting activity in the house was told by the family for many years.

== See also ==
- National Register of Historic Places listings in Natchitoches Parish, Louisiana
