= Oakland Plantation (Natchitoches Parish, Louisiana) =

Historic house in Louisiana, United States

- U.S. National Register of Historic Places
- U.S. National Historic Landmark District
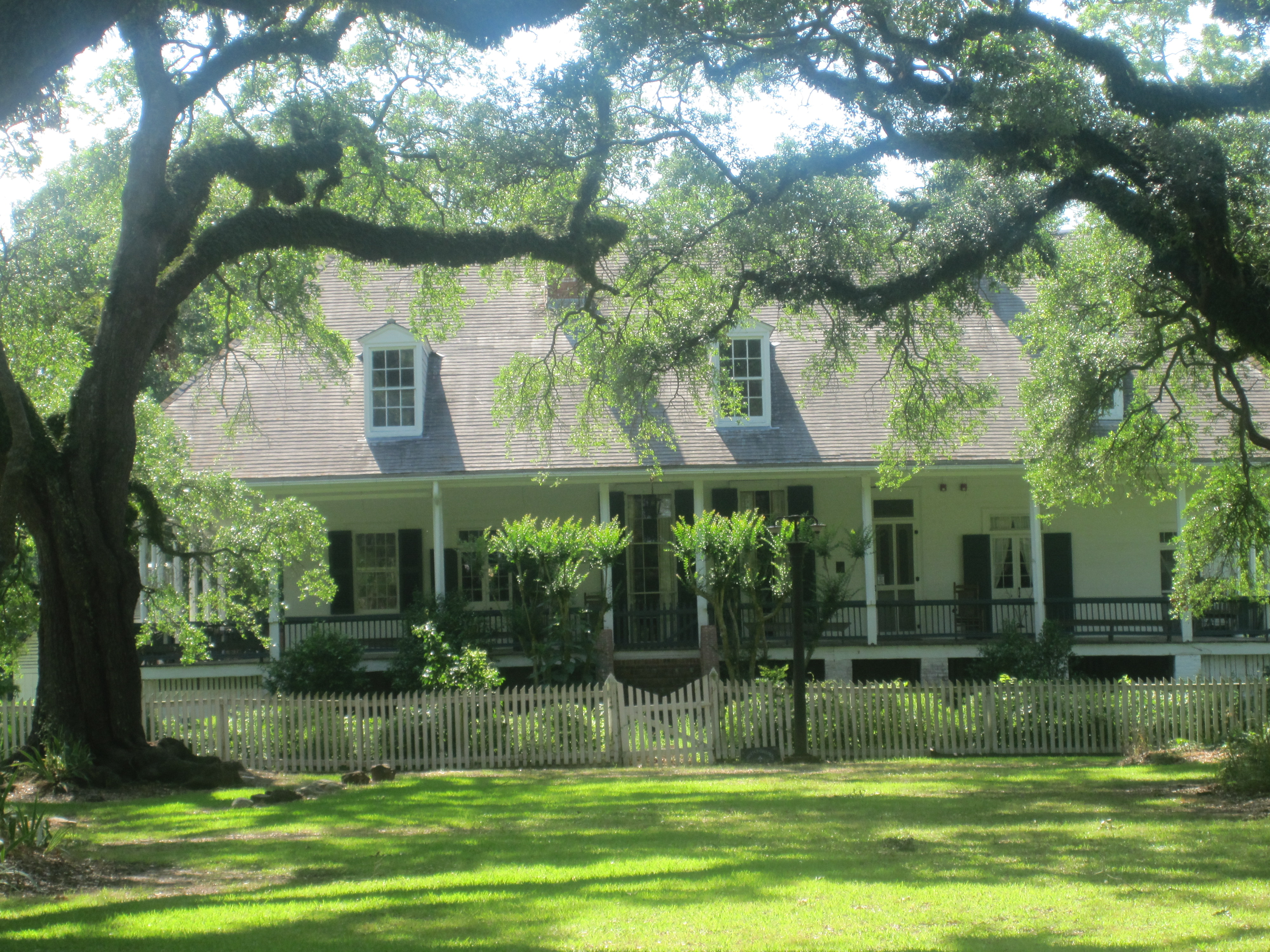
- Oakland Plantation House

- Location within Louisiana Location within the United States
- Interactive map showing the location of Oakland Plantation
- Nearest city: Natchitoches, Louisiana
- Coordinates: 31°39′54″N 93°0′12″W
- Area: 42 acres (17 ha)
- Built: 1818
- Architectural style: French Colonial Creole
- NRHP reference No.: 79001073

Significant dates
- Added to NRHP: August 29, 1979
- Designated NHLD: January 3, 2001

Oakland Plantation, originally known as the Jean Pierre Emmanuel Prud'homme Plantation, and also known as Bermuda, is a historic plantation in an unincorporated area of Natchitoches Parish, Louisiana. Founded as a forced-labor farm worked by enslaved Black people for White owners, it is one of the nation's best and most intact examples of a French Creole cotton plantation complex. The Oakland Plantation is now owned by the National Park Service as part of the Cane River Creole National Historical Park.

It has been listed on the National Register of Historic Places since August 29, 1979. It is designated as a notable destination on the state's Louisiana African American Heritage Trail. It was designated a National Historic Landmark on January 3, 2001.

== Geography ==
The Oakland Plantation grounds and structures are within the Cane River Creole National Historical Park, in the National Park Service's Cane River National Heritage Area. The plantation is situated on a bend of the Cane River Lake, with access by Louisiana Highway 119 in the Bermuda community near the parish seat of Natchitoches. Oakland Plantation is located near the Magnolia Plantation, which is another National Historic Landmark within the Cane River Creole National Historical Park; and the Melrose Plantation.

Oakland Plantation is associated with the Atahoe Plantation (of Natchez), which was developed by one of the Prud'homme family. The Cherokee Plantation was built by a granddaughter of Jean Pierre Emmanuel Prud'homme. It is also associated with the community of Isle Brevelle, a local Creole community.

== History ==
=== 19th century ===
The original owners, Jean-Pierre Emanuel Prud'homme and his wife Marie Catherine (Lambre) Prud'homme, acquired the land for the Oakland Plantation through a 1785 Spanish-Era land grant. They completed building the Oakland Plantation house in 1821. The family tradition claims that Oakland was one of the first plantations in the area to grow cotton on a large scale, which was cultivated and harvested by enslaved African Americans. They also raised and used farm animals, which were served by extant buildings, such as the dipping vat, the turkey shed, the mule barn, two pigeonniers, and several chicken coops. At the end of 1795, 38 enslaved African Americans lived at the Oakland Plantation.

The Prud'hommes also owned and operated a general store on the plantation, which also housed the Bermuda U.S. Post Office for many years. The plantation flourished in the 19th century, and by 1860, 160 enslaved African Americans harvested cotton, labored in the house, or crafted tools and furniture.

After the Civil War, the Oakland plantation continued to produce large amounts of cotton. Sharecroppers, primarily the descendants of the enslaved African Americans who lived at the Oakland Plantation, worked on small plots of land and lived in the property's cabins. After the mechanization of cotton farming in the 1960s, tenants like Elvin Shields's family were asked to leave the plantation, putting an end to the Oakland Plantation's sharecropping era.

=== 20th century ===
Descendant J. Alphonse Prud'homme won the gold medal at the 1904 World's Fair in St. Louis for growing the highest-grade cotton in the South.

The Cane River Creole National Historical Park was authorized by Congress in 1994, with support by US Senator J. Bennett Johnston (R-LA). In 1997, the National Park Service acquired the main buildings and surrounding land of Oakland Plantation for the park. The NPS has reached advanced stages in the preservation and conservation of the many outbuildings, and of the plantation house. They have completed furnishing interiors with furniture, paintings, and textiles as it was in the 1860s at the end of the antebellum plantation era.

The park's program includes interpretation of emancipation and the history of freedmen and Creoles of color, and their descendants, who lived and worked on Oakland Plantation for nearly 100 years after the American Civil War. They were all integral to the region's community life. In 2018, the National Park Service continued these interpretive efforts and undertook an ethnographic project to hear from Traditionally Associated People from both Oakland Plantation and Magnolia Plantation, creating five documentary films. The community has strongly associated the plantation with the Prud'homme family, many of whose descendants still reside in the area today.

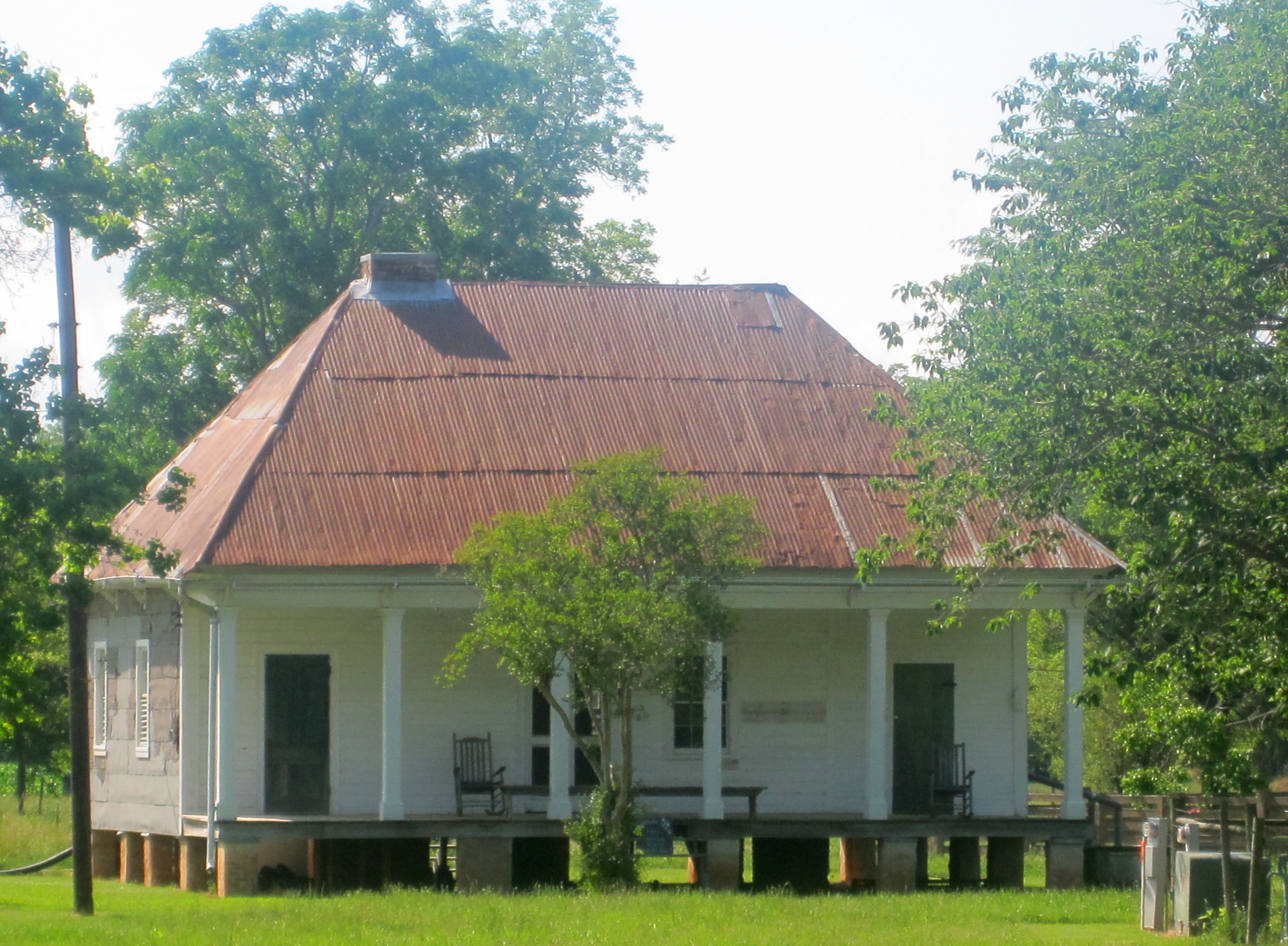
Overseer's house

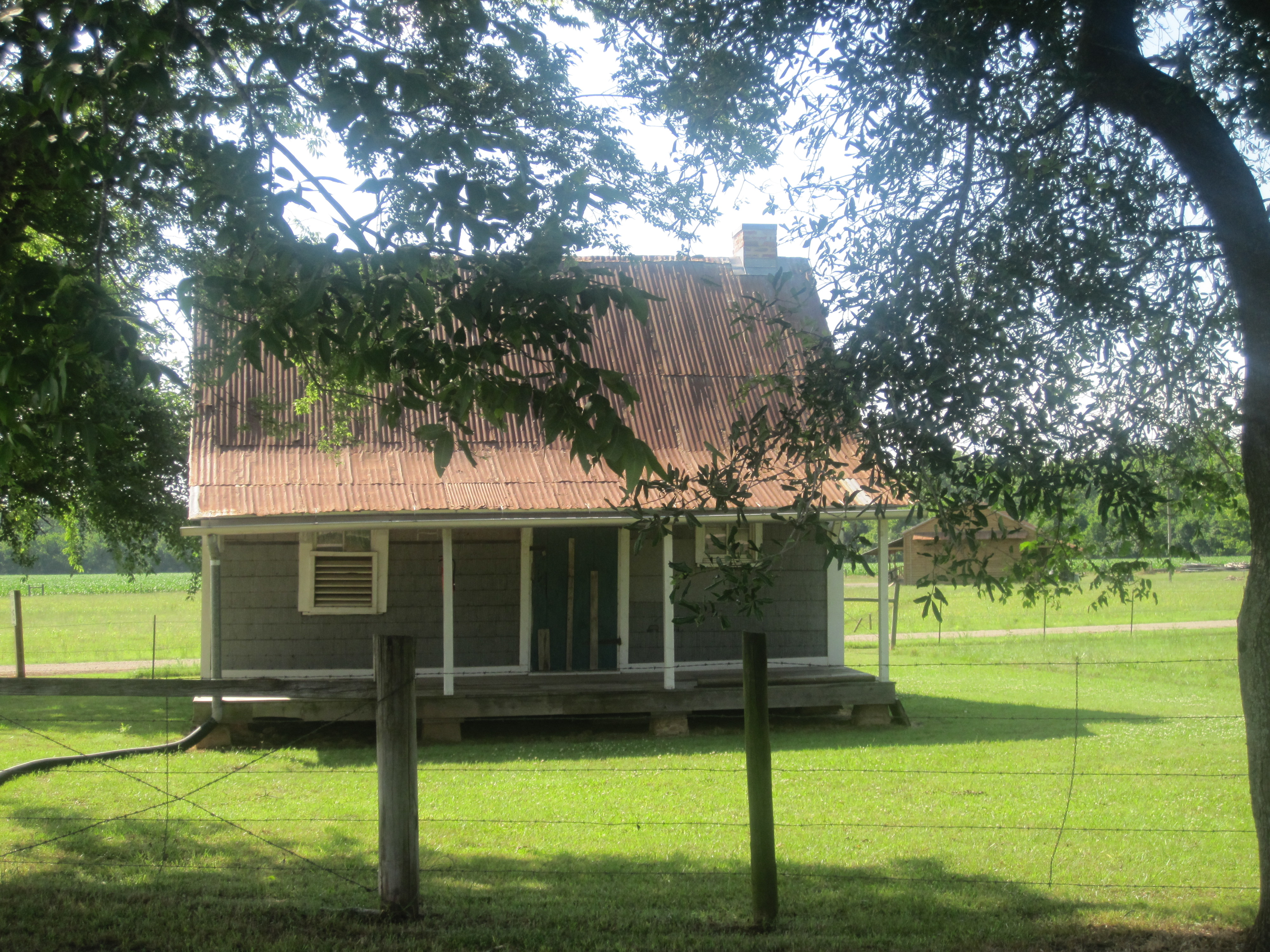
Slave quarters

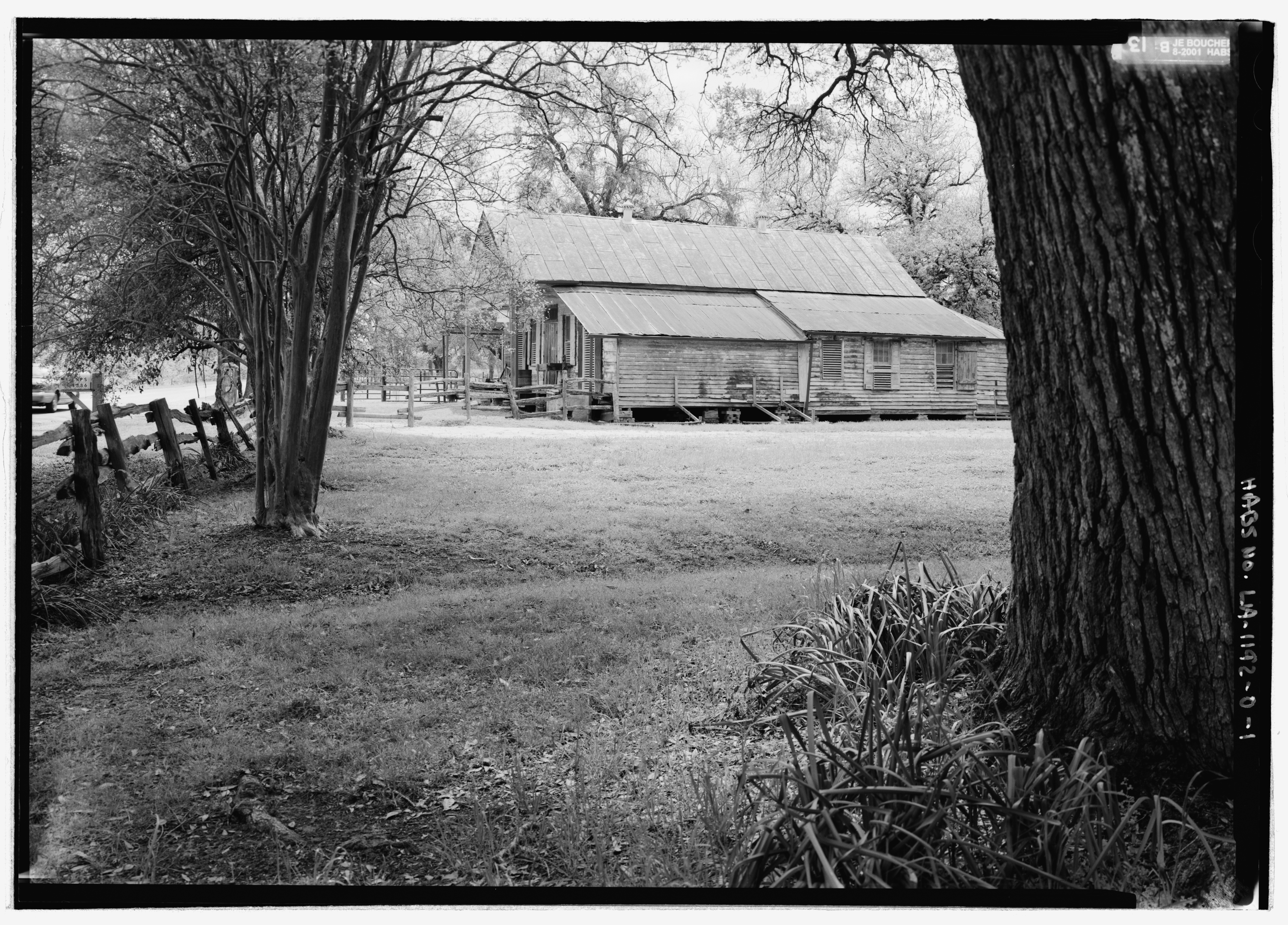
Plantation store and post office

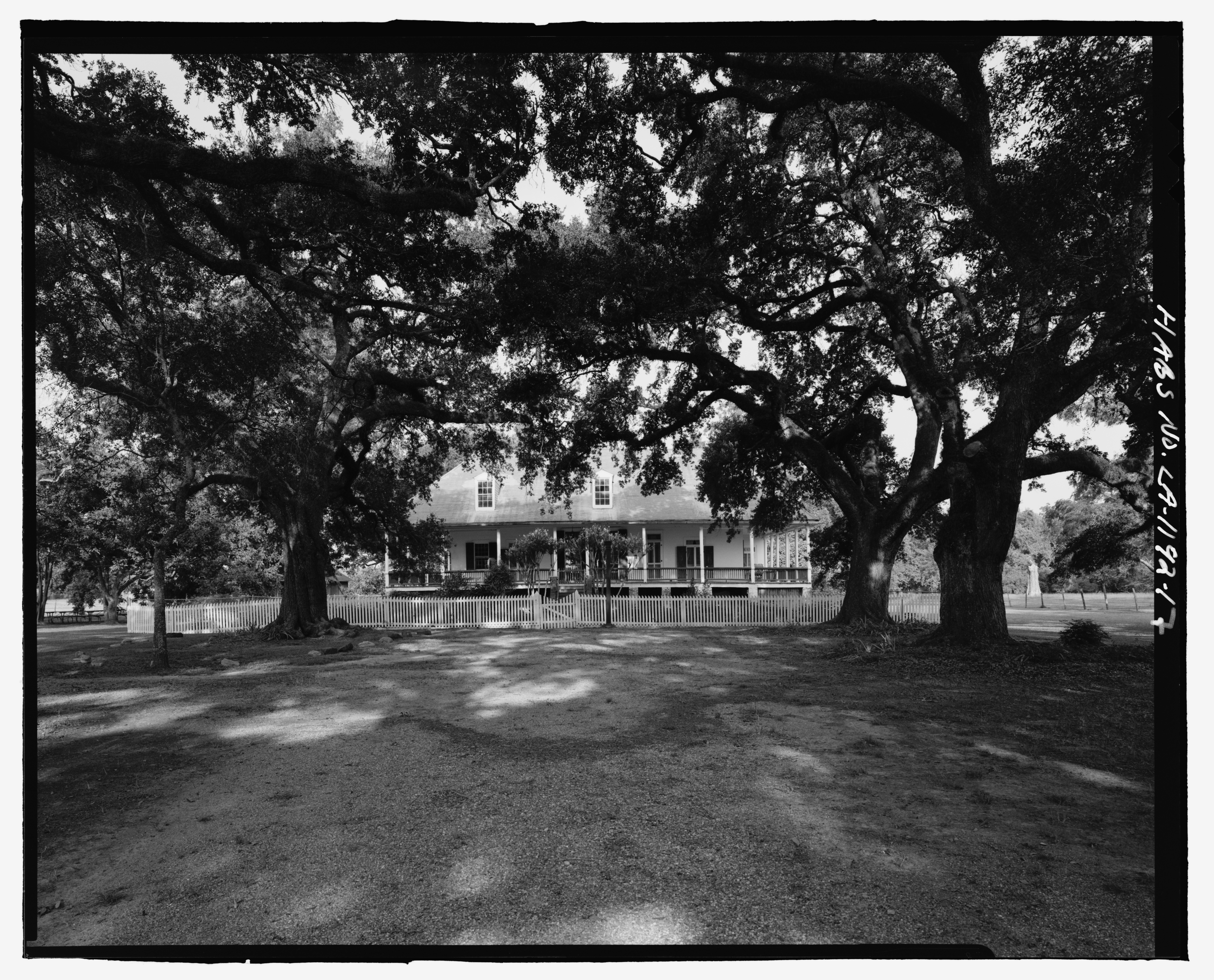
Approach to Oakland plantation house

== See also ==
- Antebellum architecture
- National Register of Historic Places listings in Natchitoches Parish, Louisiana
- List of National Historic Landmarks in Louisiana
- Cane River National Heritage Area topics
- Plantations in Louisiana
