= Oaklawn Plantation (Natchez, Louisiana) =

Historic house in Louisiana, United States

- U.S. National Register of Historic Places
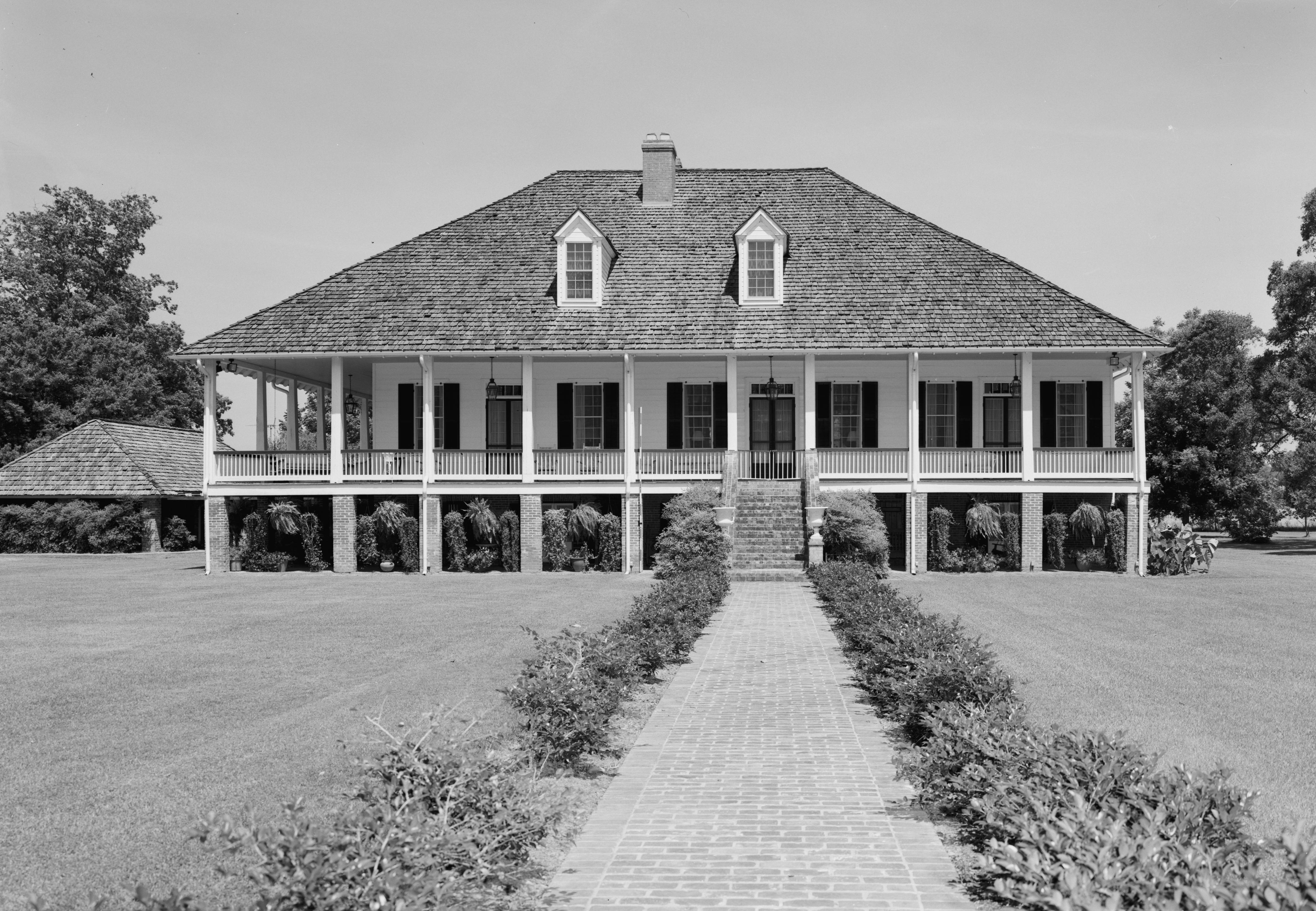

- Location within Louisiana Location within the United States
- Location: Natchitoches, Louisiana
- Coordinates: 31°41′41″N 93°01′53″W
- Area: 4 acres (1.6 ha)
- Built: 1830
- Architectural style: French Colonial
- NRHP reference No.: 79001072
- Added to NRHP: March 28, 1979

The Oaklawn Plantation is a historic cotton plantation house near Natchez, Louisiana. It is located on Louisiana Highway 494 southeast of Natchitoches in Natchitoches Parish, Louisiana. It has been listed on the National Register of Historic Places since March 28, 1979.

== History ==
The mansion was built in 1830 for Narcisse Prudhomme, who held as many as 104 enslaved people on the property. After his death in 1859, the plantation was inherited by his son, Achille Prudhomme. Although the plantation survived the Civil War of 1861–1865 intact, after Achille's death, the land was divided into parcels by his heirs and sold off. In 1916, Charles Edgar Cloutier, the husband of Adeline Prudhomme, a great-grandniece of Narcisse Prudhomme, purchased the property.

It is now owned by filmwriter Robert Harling, author of the play, later a film, Steel Magnolias (dir. Herbert Ross, 1989).

== Architecture ==
The house has three stories, fourteen chimneys and a large gallery. It is an example of French creole architecture.
