= Kate Chopin House (Cloutierville, Louisiana) =

Historic house in Louisiana, United States

- Formerly listed on the U.S. National Register of Historic Places
- Former U.S. National Historic Landmark
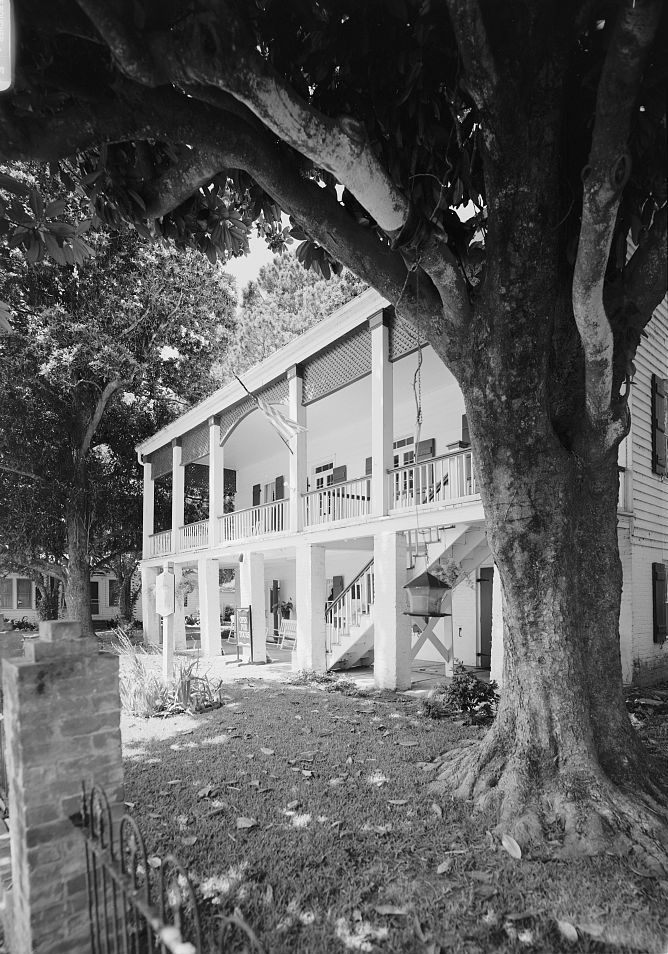
- Historic American Buildings Survey photo of the house

- Location within Louisiana Location within the United States
- Interactive map showing the location of Kate Chopin House
- Location: Main St. (LA 1), Cloutierville, Louisiana
- Coordinates: 31°32′26.04″N 92°55′1.53″W
- NRHP reference No.: 93001601

Significant dates
- Added to NRHP: April 19, 1993
- Designated NHL: April 19, 1993
- Removed from NRHP: December 28, 2015
- Delisted NHL: December 28, 2015

The Kate Chopin House, also known as the Bayou Folk Museum or Alexis Cloutier House, was a house in Cloutierville, Louisiana. It was the home of Kate Chopin, author of The Awakening, after her marriage.

== Overview ==
The house was located on Main Street (Louisiana Highway 1) in Cloutierville, in Natchitoches Parish, Louisiana. The home was built by the town's founder, Alexis Cloutier and was constructed using a combination of handmade brick, hand-hewn cypress boards, and bousillage. Its construction, done through the use of slave labor, dated to between 1806 and 1813.

Kate Chopin moved here with her husband Oscar and their five children in 1879. Her sixth child, a daughter named Lélia, was born here shortly after the family's arrival. Oscar set up a general store and ran the business end of the family plantation. Shortly after their arrival in Cloutierville, he inherited a quarter of the family property.

Chopin would later describe the neighborhood in her 1891 short story "For Marse Chouchoute" as "two long rows of very old frame houses, facing each other closely across a dusty roadway". Neighbors, mostly of French-Creole descent, did not approve of Chopin's fashion and tendency to smoke cigarettes, play cards, and go for walks alone. Local gossip also suggested that Chopin lifted her skirt higher than necessary when walking, showing her ankles.

Kate Chopin only lived here for about four years when her husband died. Oscar Chopin had suffered from malaria and overdosed on quinine, leading to his wife Kate to take over the business. However, she soon left the home and relocated to St. Louis, Missouri by mid-1884 to be with her mother. She left her sons with the family of her husband in Cloutierville.

Chopin used some of her experience in the town for inspiration for several of her writings, including Bayou Folk, A Night in Acadie, and The Awakening.

== Modern history ==
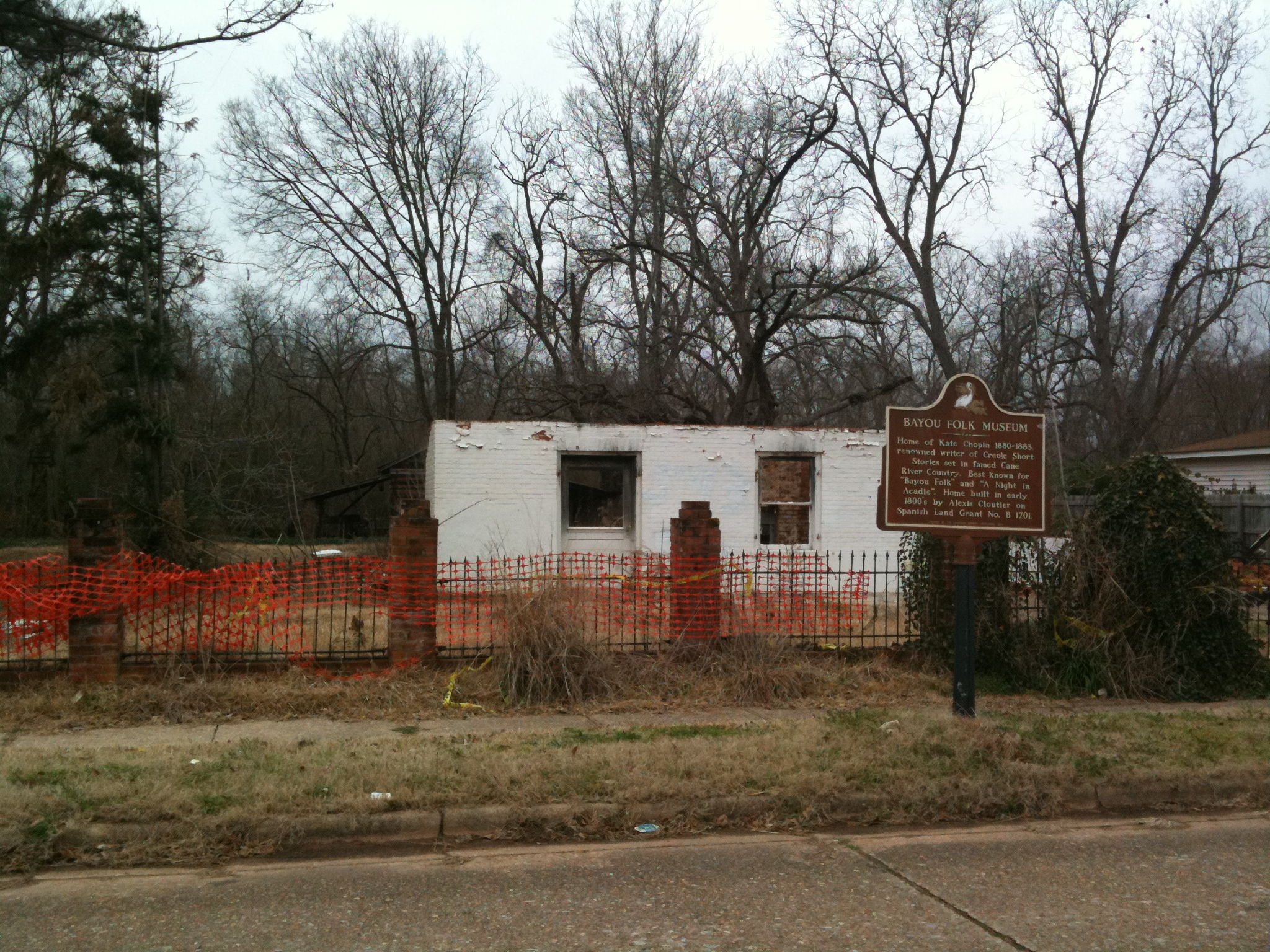
Ruins of the house after the 2008 fire

The house was opened as a museum in 1979. It was declared a National Historic Landmark in 1993 for its association with Kate Chopin's life and her use of area happenings as source for bayou life covered in much of her writings. Though the building was restored, the wainscoting was original, as were many of the glass panes. A collection of Chopin artifacts was displayed in one of the basement rooms. The museum, known as the Bayou Folk Museum (in part because of Chopin's book of the same name), was run by the Association for Preservation of Historic Natchitoches.

The house was destroyed in a fire on October 1, 2008. Though the cause of the fire was not determined, the home's destruction inspired the use of preventative measures at other historic structures in Louisiana. Its National Historic Landmark designation and National Register of Historic Places listing were withdrawn in December 2015.

== See also ==
- Kate Chopin House (St. Louis, Missouri), another one of Chopin's residences
- List of National Historic Landmarks in Louisiana
- National Register of Historic Places listings in Natchitoches Parish, Louisiana

== Sources ==
- Baldwin, Jack and Winnie. Baldwin's Guide to Museums of Louisiana. Gretna, Louisiana: Pelican Publishing, 1999. ISBN 9781455600557
- Schmidt, Shannon McKenna and Joni Rendon. Novel Destinations: Literary Landmarks from Jane Austen's Bath to Ernest Hemingway's Key West. National Geographic Society, 2008. ISBN 978-1-4262-0454-8
- Toth, Emily. Unveiling Kate Chopin. University Press of Mississippi, 1999. ISBN 1-57806-101-6
