= Magnolia Plantation (Derry, Louisiana) =

Historic house in Louisiana, United States

- U.S. National Register of Historic Places
- U.S. National Historic Landmark
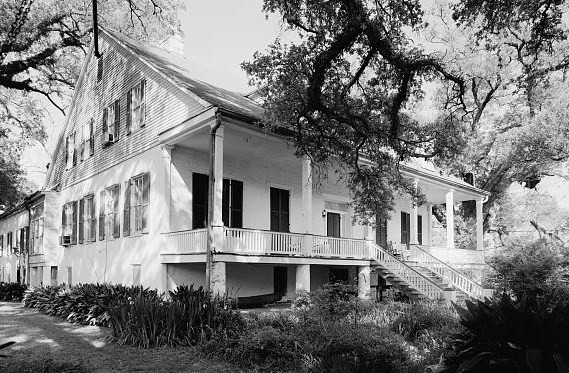
- Magnolia Plantation House

- Location within Louisiana Location within the United States
- Nearest city: Derry, Louisiana
- Coordinates: 31°32′59″N 92°56′26″W
- Built: 1840
- Architectural style: Acadian Cottage
- NRHP reference No.: 79001071

Significant dates
- Added to NRHP: March 07, 1979
- Designated NHL: January 3, 2001

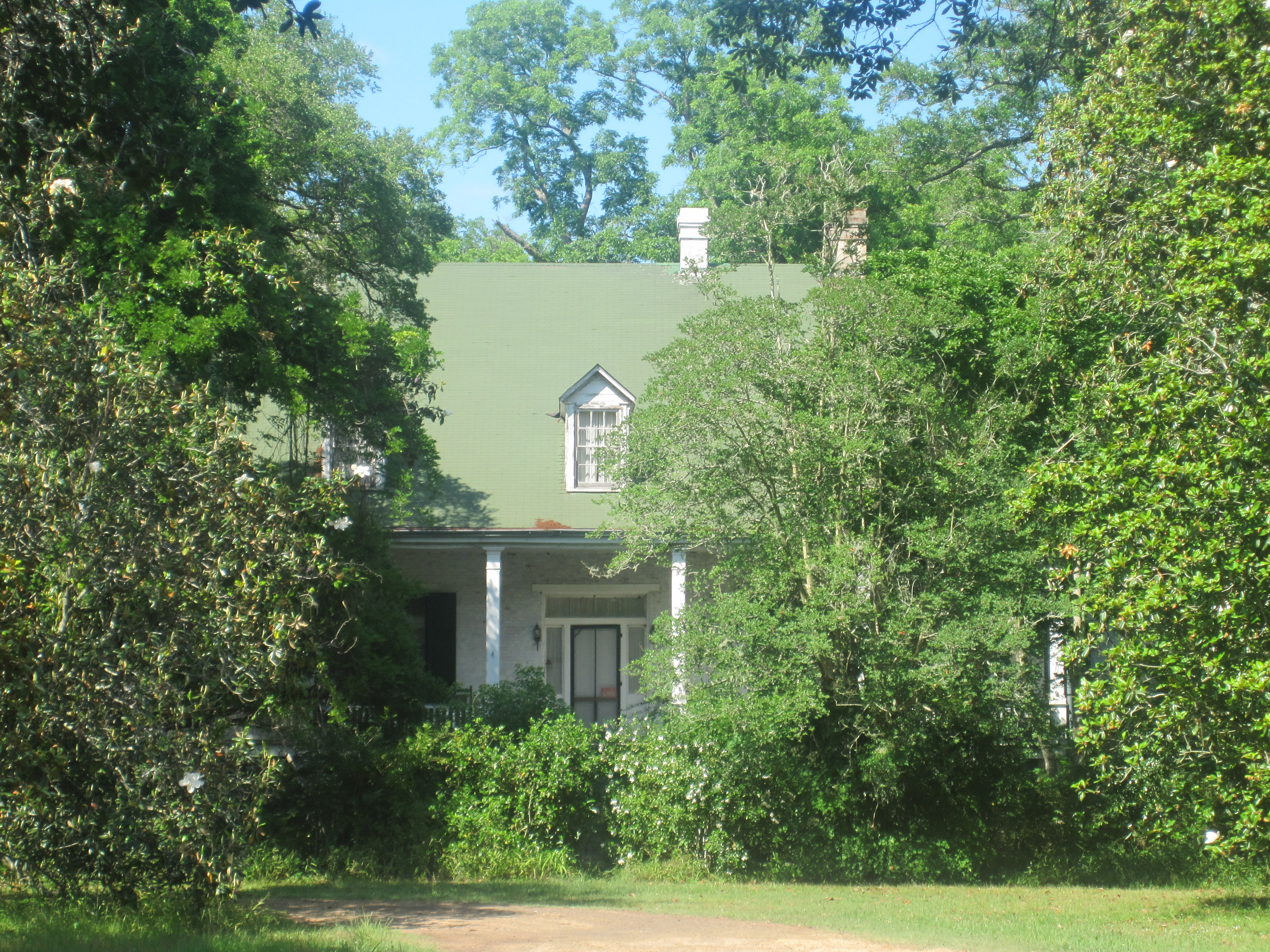
Shown here hidden by trees is Magnolia Plantation House, located adjacent to the Cane River Creole National Historical Park in south Natchitoches Parish.

Magnolia Plantation is a former cotton plantation in Natchitoches Parish, Louisiana. The site was declared a National Historic Landmark in 2001, significant as one of the most intact 19th-century plantation complexes in the nation, as it is complete with a suite of slave cabins and numerous outbuildings and period technology. Included in the Cane River Creole National Historical Park, Magnolia Plantation is also a destination on the Louisiana African American Heritage Trail. It is one of two plantations in the park; the other is Oakland Plantation.

== History ==
This plantation can be traced to Jean Baptiste LeComte II, who received French and Spanish land grants in the mid-18th century. This began the plantation's recorded history. But the first structures were not built until the 19th century, and the plantation was not operating until 1830. Ambrose LeComte, son of Jean Baptiste, married Julia Buard. They began a tradition of community and cultivation on a vast piece of property. Two of their daughters, Laura and Ursula Atala, married two sons from the Hertzog family: Bernard Theophile Henry and Matthew Hertzog, respectively. Atala (LeComte) and Matthew Hertzog took over the plantation shortly after their marriage in 1852, thus linking the Hertzog name to Magnolia. "By 1860, Ambrose II owned multiple properties of over 6,000 acres. Cotton and other crops were cultivated and harvested by 275 enslaved persons housed in 70 cabins."

Magnolia Plantation is exceptional because of the surviving farming technology, such as the cotton picker tractors and two cotton gins (both steam- and animal-powered). It has 21 buildings that contribute to the significance of the site, an unusually high number for surviving plantations. Among these are the eight brick cabins of the original slave quarters, which contained 70 cabins for the numerous slaves. After the American Civil War, these cabins were used by freedmen, black sharecroppers whose families lived and worked on the plantation for 100 more years. With mechanization replacing workers, the number of cabins maintained gradually declined.

The plantation was also exceptional for its influence in the community and the Cane River area. The Hertzogs had to rebuild the plantation house and other buildings damaged in the Civil War. But for 100 years after the war, "the Hertzogs," as the place was familiarly known, served as the center of a larger community of blacks and Creoles of color who also lived and worked on the plantation. The blacks were mostly Protestants, whereas the Creoles of color were Catholic and mostly leased land as tenant farmers. They all felt they had a stake, along with the Hertzogs, in maintaining the productivity of the land. By the mid-20th century, mechanization of agriculture reduced the need for workers and many people left for urban jobs.

Sabin Gianelloni, Jr. purchased some part of Magnolia Plantation in August or September 1951 from Hertzog descendants and held it for a time. But Hertzog descendants continued to own and live in the main house until 2000; the last was Betty Hertzog, who lived most of her life in the house. The official group, Descendants of Ambrose John Hertzog and Sarah Jane Hunt Hertzog, took over after she decided to leave the house. It manages the house and agricultural farmland.

== Today ==
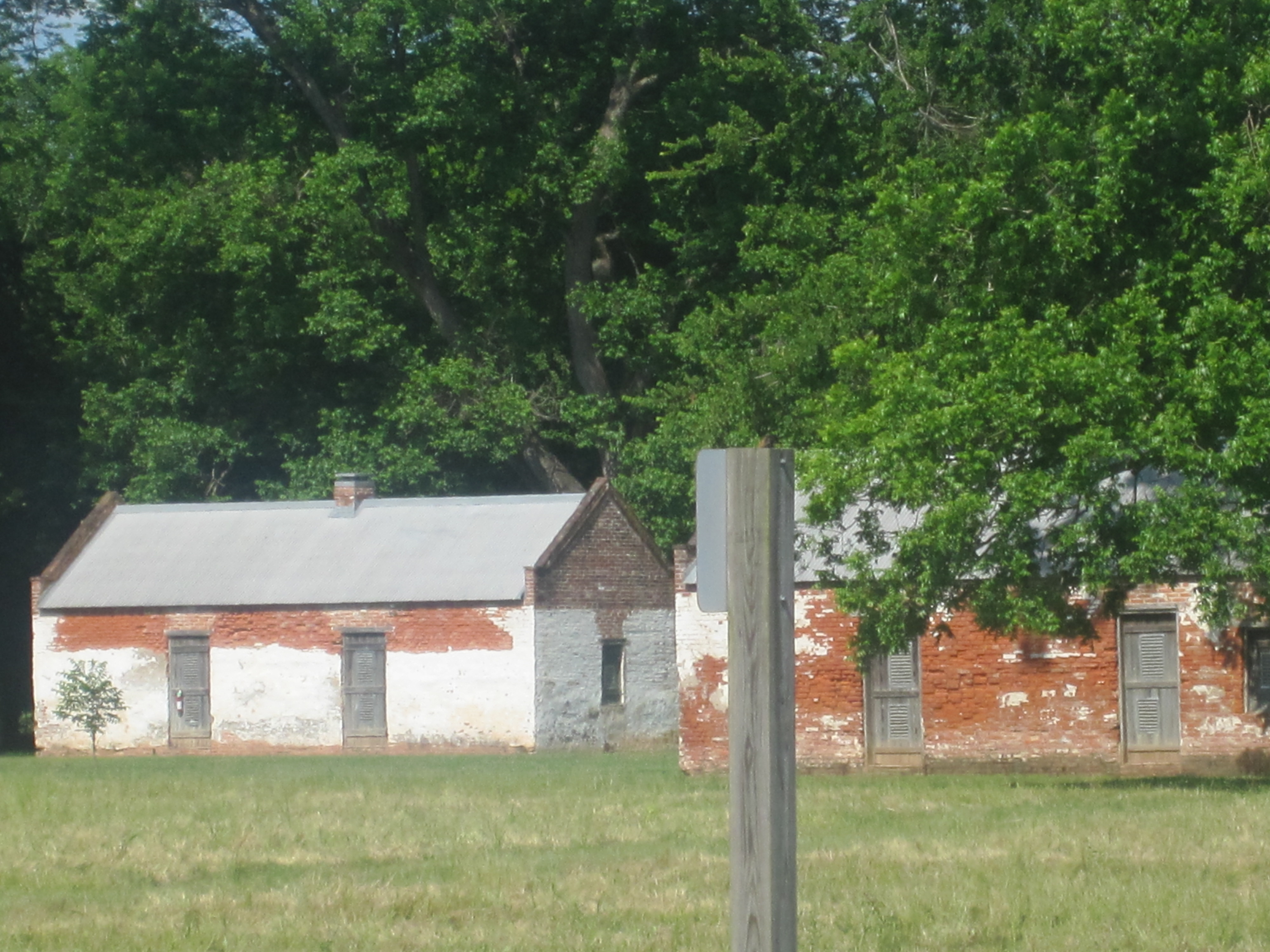
Slave quarters at Magnolia Plantation near Derry, Louisiana

The park portion of the plantation is owned by the National Park Service. The main house and the farming acreage is owned by the Descendants of Ambrose John Hertzog and Sarah Jane Hunter Hertzog. The Park Service has acquired 16 buildings, including the plantation store, the cotton gin, the Overseer's House (or Slave Hospital); blacksmith shop and the brick quarters. It continues to improve their condition to preserve them for future generations. On December 29, 2022, the main house and surrounding grounds were added to the national historical park's authorized boundary.

The Cane River Creole National Historical Park is located at 5487 Louisiana Highway 119. The closest town is Derry, Louisiana. The park is open from Mondays to Fridays, from 8 am to 4:30 pm.

== See also ==
- List of National Historic Landmarks in Louisiana
- National Register of Historic Places listings in Natchitoches Parish, Louisiana
