= Cane River Creole National Historical Park =

National Historical Park of the United States

- Cane River Creole; National Historical Park
- U.S. National Register of Historic Places
- U.S. National Historical Park
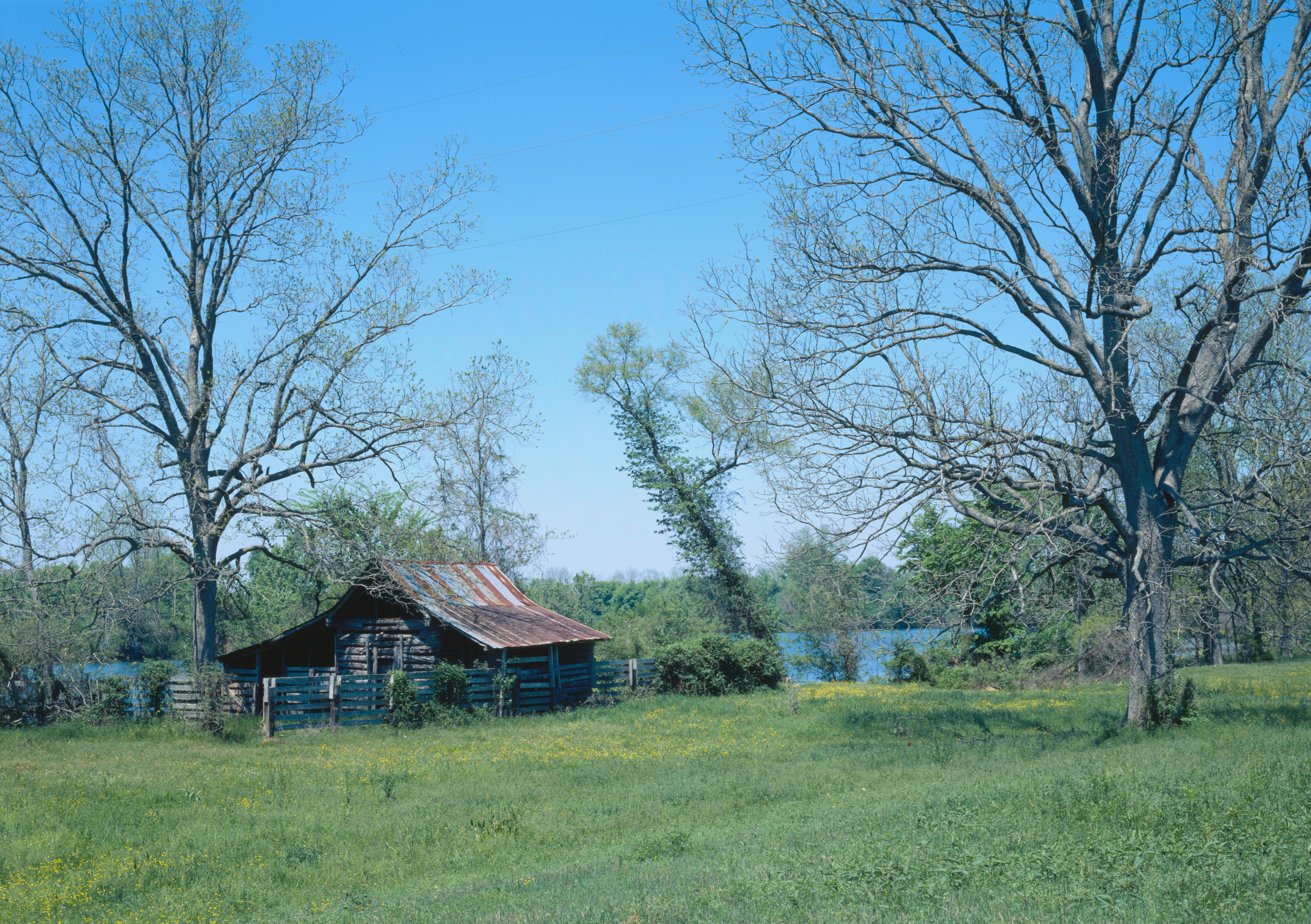
- Tenant farmer log house in the Cane River Creole National Historical Park

- Location within Louisiana Location within the United States
- Location: 4386 Hwy 494, Natchez, Louisiana
- Nearest city: Natchitoches
- Coordinates: 31°39′56″N 93°00′10″W
- Area: 207 acres (84 ha)
- Visitation: 11,203 (2025)
- Website: www.nps.gov/cari/index.htm
- NRHP reference No.: 01000226

Significant dates
- Added to NRHP: November 2, 1994
- Designated NHP: November 2, 1994

The Cane River Creole National Historical Park was established in 1994 to preserve the resources and cultural landscapes of the Cane River region in Natchitoches Parish, Louisiana. Located along Cane River Lake, the park is approximately 63 acres and includes two French Creole cotton plantations, Oakland and Magnolia. Both plantations are complete in their historic settings, including landscapes, outbuildings, structures, furnishings, and artifacts; and they are the most intact French Creole cotton plantations in the United States. In total, 65 historic structures and over a million artifacts enhance the National Park Service mission as it strives to tell the story of the evolution of plantation agriculture through the perspective of the land owners, enslaved workers, overseers, skilled workers, and tenant farmers who resided along the Cane River for over two hundred years. This park is included as a site on the Louisiana African American Heritage Trail.

A defining characteristic of the park is the conservation and interpretation of Creole culture. In colonial Louisiana the term "Creole" was used to indicate New World products derived from Old World stock, and could apply to people, architecture, or livestock. Regarding people, Creole historically referred to those born in Louisiana during the French and Spanish periods, regardless of their ethnicity. Today, as in the past, Creole transcends racial boundaries. It connects people to their colonial roots, be they descendants of European settlers, enslaved Africans, or the many of mixed heritage, which may include African, French, Spanish, and American Indian influences. The Prud'hommes of Oakland and the LeComtes of Magnolia were considered French Creole. As with others in the area, the homes and plantations of these families reflected the French Creole architectural style and way of life.

The historic landscapes and dozens of structures preserved at Oakland and Magnolia plantations are the setting for the stories of workers (enslaved and free) and late post-Civil War tenant farmers who worked the same land for over two centuries, adapting to historical, economic, social, and agricultural change. Today their descendants carry on many of their traditions.

== Magnolia ==
The origins of Magnolia Plantation can be traced to the mid-18th century, when the French LeComte family received grants to the land, and are continued by the French Hertzog family. In 1753, Jean Baptiste LeComte received a French land grant in Natchitoches Parish. LeComte established the Shallow Lake plantation and focused mainly on tobacco as a commodity crop, and subsistence farming. The LeComte family pioneered through the colonial rule of the French and the Spanish, and became one of the most successful landowning families in Natchitoches Parish. By the early 19th century the LeComte family was producing cotton and expanding their landholdings.

In the 1830s, Ambrose LeComte II acquired the land that would come to form Magnolia Plantation. During this period, the LeComtes were extremely prosperous and began to build most of the structures that are still located on Magnolia. By the 1850s Ambrose and his wife Julia (Buard) retired to their Natchitoches townhouse, where Ambrose could focus on his lucrative race horse business. By 1852 management of the plantation was turned over to Ambrose's son-in-law, Matthew Hertzog. The name Hertzog would eventually become inextricably linked with the plantation.

This prosperous period for the planter family would come to an abrupt halt with the Civil War. During the Civil War, Magnolia's main house was burned to the ground by Union troops during the Red River Campaign. In addition, crops and plantation structures were destroyed by both Confederate and Union armies.

After the Civil War, the LeComte-Hertzog family rebuilt their plantation along with the main house. They converted much of their land to be worked by the new labor system of sharecropping by freedmen. In addition, they leased some acreage to tenant farmers, who were mostly Creoles of color.

The system of sharecropping required an agreement between the landowner and the tenant. The sharecropper agreed to farm a section of the owner's land in exchange for part of the crops or the money the crops generated. The plantation owner often supplied the seed and agricultural equipment required to cultivate the crop. On larger plantations, such as Magnolia and Oakland, a plantation store was opened to sell goods to the sharecroppers. A hardship faced by many sharecroppers across the South was the cycle of poverty created through the constant flow of debt and repayment owed to the plantation store. There was often little money left to live on.

During the 20th century, the old plantation world was fading. Mechanization replaced many black workers on the cotton fields by the 1960s. Yet many of the community's old ways persisted. At Magnolia, workers and planters still enjoyed baseball games and horse races, and celebrated Juneteenth. The last black family left the plantation in 1968. The Hertzog family contracted with an agricultural company to work the land.

In the early 21st century, Magnolia Plantation is recognized as a Bicentennial Farm and a National Historic Landmark. The main house at Magnolia and the farming acreage are owned by the Hertzog family and are not open to the public. On December 29, 2022, the main house and surrounding grounds were added to the national historical park's authorized boundary.

But the Plantation Store, the Overseer's House, the Blacksmith Shop, the Slave/Tenant Quarters, the Gin Barn, Cotton Picker Shed, and Carriage House are all part of Cane River Creole National Historical Park, which was designated in 1994. They are open to visitors. The gin barn houses two types of cotton gins and a rare 1830s mule-powered cotton press, which is the last of its kind still standing in its original location. The lives of the diverse people associated with Magnolia are being represented to reflect the resilience, resourcefulness, dedication, and continuous interaction of families and communities along Cane River.

== Oakland ==
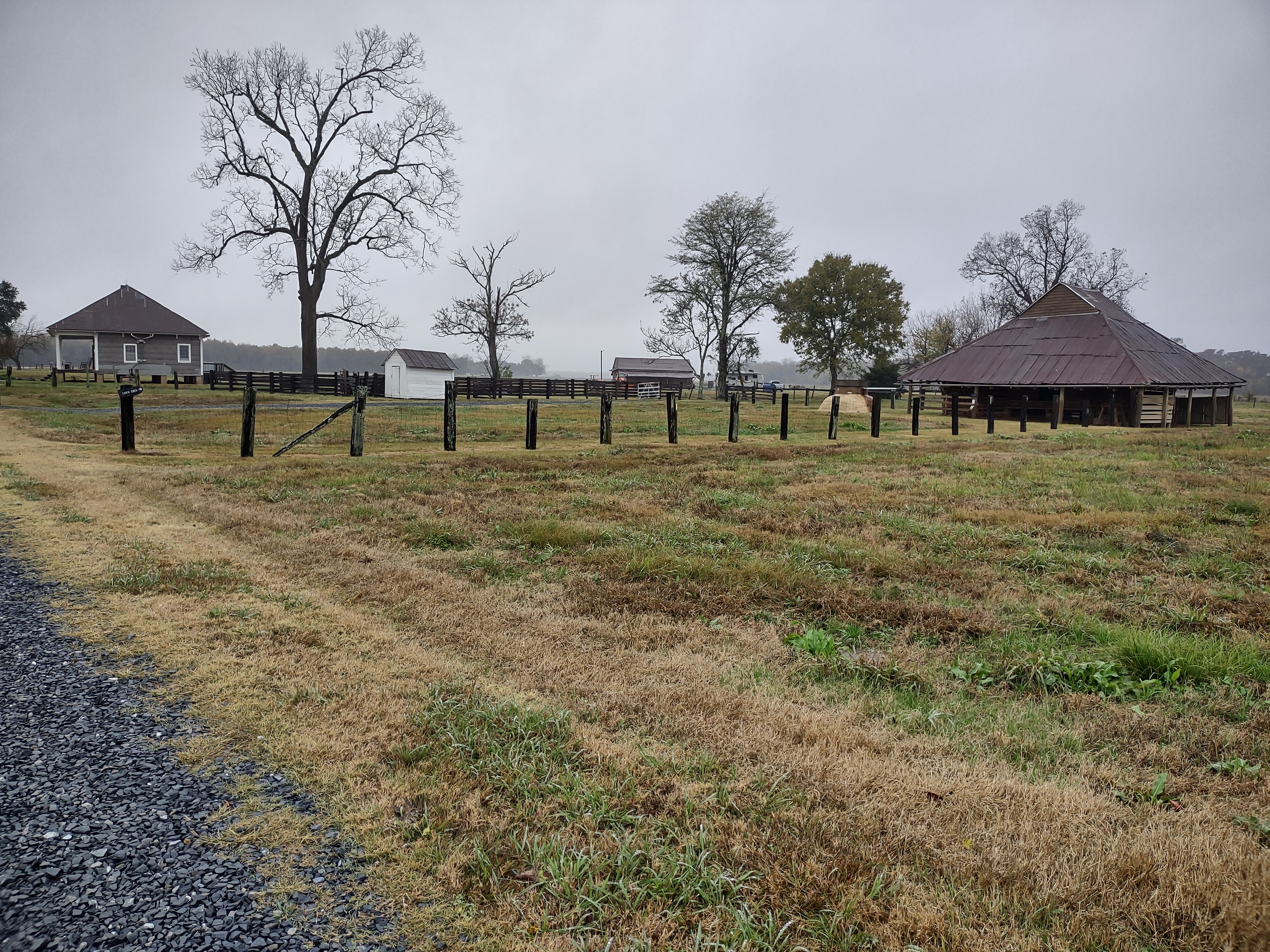
Structures at Oakland Plantation in 2022

Oakland Plantation was started in the 18th century with a land grant to the French Creole Prud'homme family. In 1789, Emanuel Prud'homme received a land grant from the Spanish government, who ruled Louisiana during that time. Emmanuel was one of the first planters to grow cotton in the area. During this period, Emmanuel began to purchase enslaved workers to labor in the fields and build the structures needed on the plantation. In 1818, Prud'homme began construction of his plantation home. In the late 1820s, Emanuel's son, Pierre Phanor Prud'homme, took over management of the plantation.

As with Magnolia and most large plantations of the early 19th century, the Prud'homme plantation was a self-sufficient community that grew or made everything that was needed. Its commodity crop was cotton, but produce was grown for use on the plantation, as well as food for animals. Livestock structures were constructed to house mules, chickens, horses, and turkeys. In addition, housing had to be constructed for the overseer and the enslaved people, as well as work sites, such as the wash house and the carpenter shop. An unusual building to modern eyes is the pigeonnière, where pigeons were raised to be enjoyed as a food delicacy.

Although Pierre Phanor had managed the plantation since the 1820s, he did not become the owner until 1845 upon his father's death. Phanor continued to successfully manage the plantation until the Civil War. During these years the enslaved population continued to perform a variety of skills: from cultivating the land and processing the cotton, to constructing the buildings, managing livestock, and making most of the goods needed by the plantation's occupants.

The Civil War brought destruction to the Cane River region. During the Red River Campaign both the Union and Confederate armies destroyed plantation buildings, crops, and livestock. At the Prud'homme plantation, the cotton gin was burned. The facts relating to the survival of the plantation home and Phanor's fate have become clouded by several unconfirmed stories and legends. One family legend states that Phanor was arrested by Union soldiers. He became ill as he was moved from his plantation to Natchitoches, where he died in a cousin's home.

At war's end, Phanor's two sons divided the plantation. Jacques Alphonse Prud'homme kept the land that included the main house and surrounding lands west of the Cane River. Pierre Emmanuel Prud'homme took the land on the east side of the river and established his own plantation, which he called Atahoe.

Alphonse renamed his home as Oakland and began rebuilding his fortunes. He adapted to the free labor economy, hiring freedmen as sharecroppers; some Creoles of color leased land separately as tenant farmers. During this era, the Prud'hommes opened a store and post office at Oakland to provide supplies and services for sharecroppers and tenant farmers. The plantation store operated until 1983, serving the larger community when the number of farm workers declined. Low cotton prices in the late 19th century and a boll weevil infestation in the early 20th century resulted in mostly lean times for the planter family and the workers until after World War II.

== Legacy ==
Modernization came fitfully to Cane River. Phanor Prud'homme II bought the family's first car in 1910, while most people in the area still traveled by mule-drawn wagon. By the 1960s the family adopted mechanization for agriculture, with machines doing more of the tasks long performed by mules and human workers. During World War II and after, many of the remaining black workers had left the plantations in the Great Migration for employment in war industries.

Lyle Saxon wrote a short story titled "Cane River" published in 1926. The Cane River and Creoles also feature in Saxon's 1937 novel Children of Strangers. John Isiah Walton created an artwork depicting a girl looking at her reflection titled "Cane River".

Oakland Plantation is listed by the National Park Service as a National Historic Landmark and Bicentennial Farm. Open to the public as a unit of Cane River Creole National Historical Park, a unit of the National Park System, Oakland's outbuildings, sheds, store houses, and tenant cabins illustrate the daily life of a working cotton plantation. The site offers a window into the Creole colonial culture, maintained by ethnic French such as the Prud'homme family, along with generations of blacks and Creoles of color in the formation of the larger community culture and agricultural landscape.

== See also ==
- Isle Brevelle
- Rural African American Museum
- National Register of Historic Places listings in Natchitoches Parish, Louisiana
- Bayou Brevelle
- St. Augustine Parish (Isle Brevelle) Church
- St. Charles Chapel at Bermuda
- St. Anne Chapel at Old River
- St. Anne Church (Spanish Lake)
