= Derry, Louisiana =

- Unincorporated community
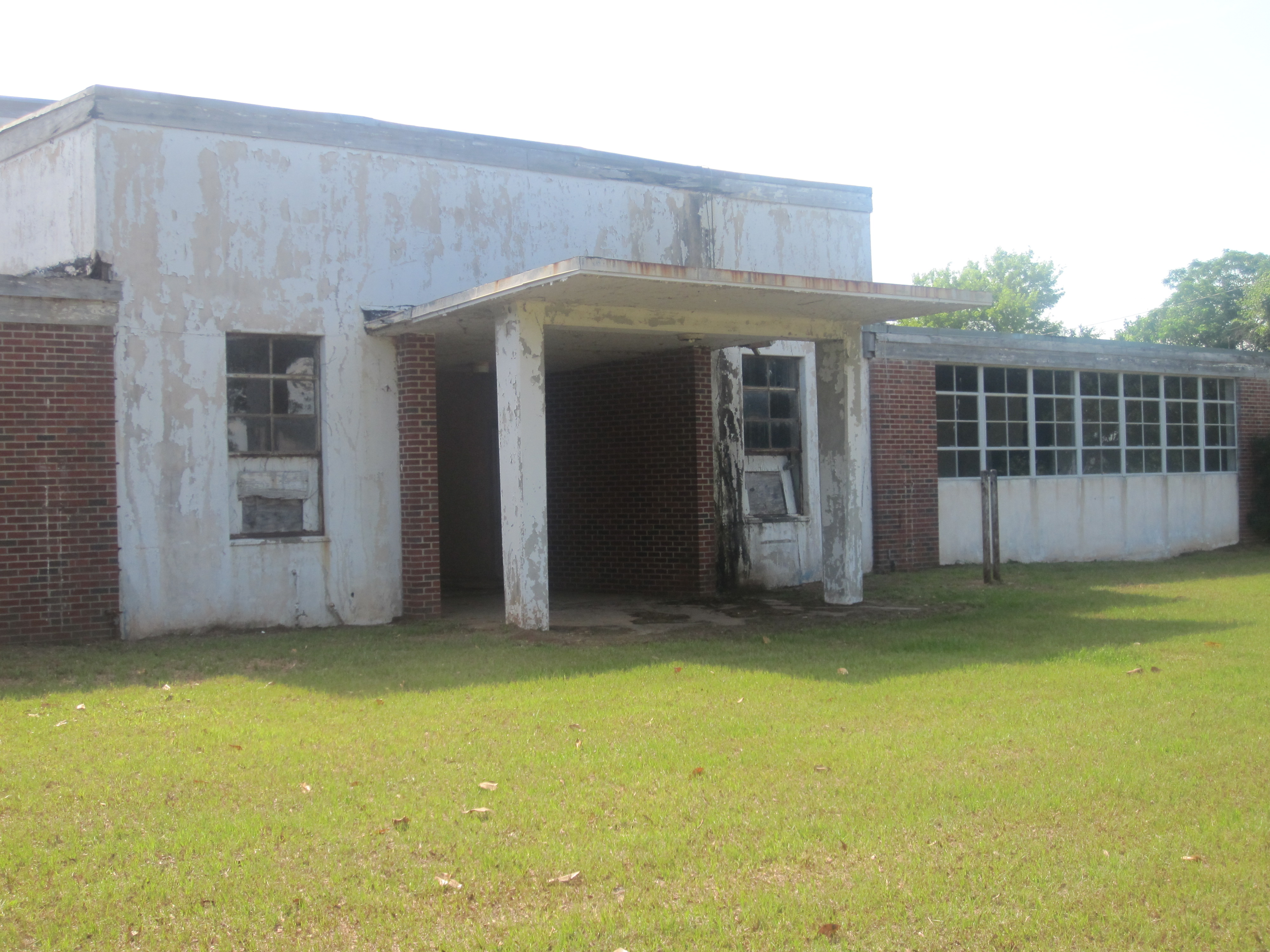
- Abandoned school near Derry in Natchitoches Parish

- Location within Louisiana Location within the United States
- Coordinates: 31°32′03″N 92°56′52″W
- Country: United States
- State: Louisiana
- Parish: Natchitoches
- Elevation: 105 ft (32 m)

Derry is an unincorporated community in Natchitoches Parish, Louisiana, United States, located on Louisiana Highway 1 near Isle Brevelle. It is the closest town to Magnolia Plantation, a National Historic Landmark.

== See also ==
- Bayou Brevelle
- Natchitoches Parish
- Cane River
- Anne des Cadeaux
- Natchitoches, Louisiana
