= Melrose, Louisiana =

Unincorporated community, Natchitoches Parish

Melrose
- Unincorporated community
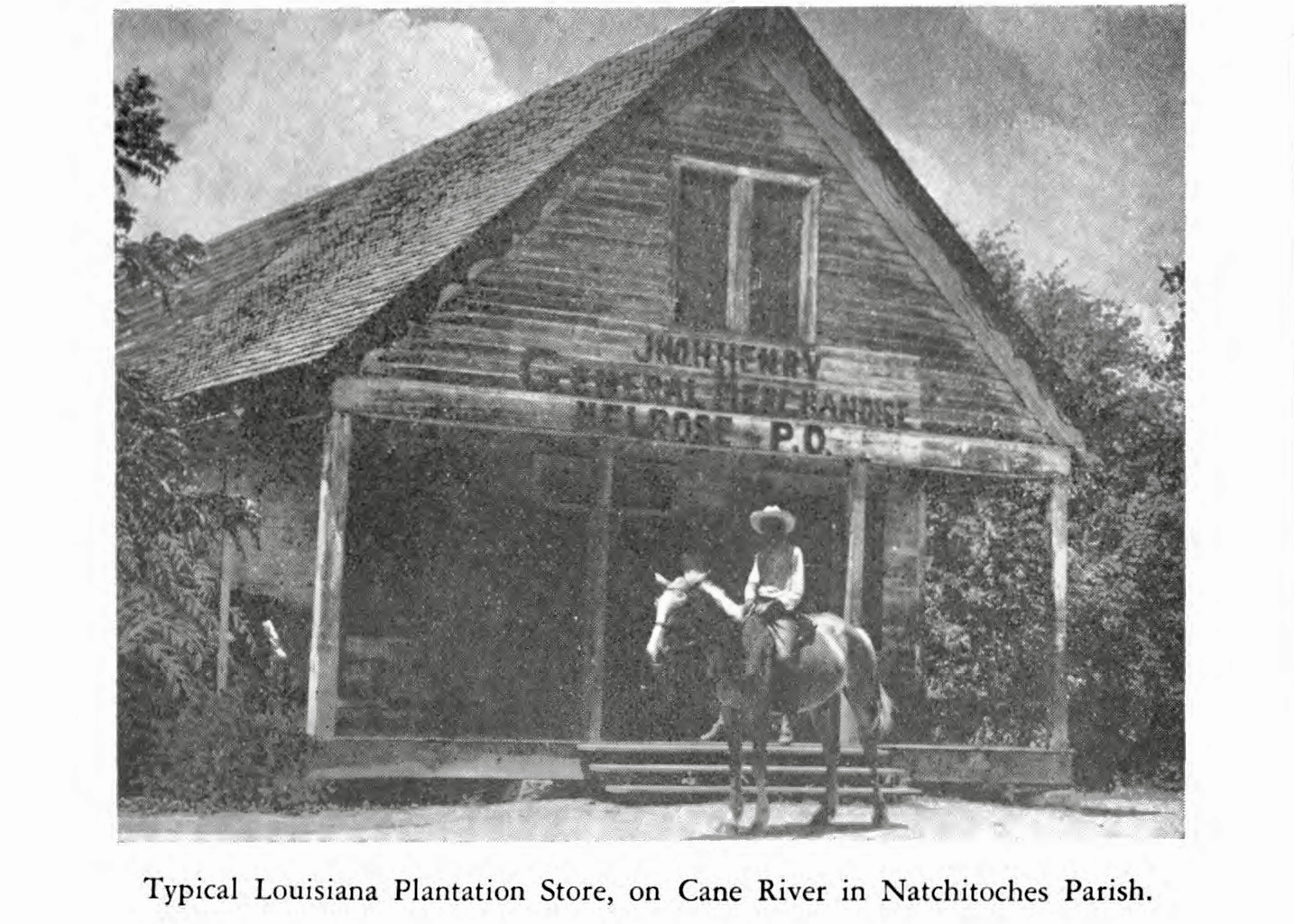
- "John Henry General Merchandise Melrose P.O." c. 1938, a "typical Louisiana plantation store"

- Location of Melrose in Louisiana Melrose (the United States)
- Coordinates: 31°35′56″N 92°58′02″W
- Country: United States
- State: Louisiana
- Parish: Natchitoches
- Elevation: 108 ft (33 m)
- Time zone: UTC-6 (CST)
  - Summer (DST): UTC-5 (CDT)
- ZIP code: 71452
- Area code: 318

Melrose is an unincorporated community in Natchitoches Parish, Louisiana, United States, including the Melrose Plantation and surrounding area, on Louisiana Highway 119. In addition to the historic plantation, the Cane River Creole National Historical Park and Heritage Area encompass the Melrose area.

Melrose is part of the Natchitoches Micropolitan Statistical Area.
