= Natchez, Louisiana =

- Village
- Village of Natchez
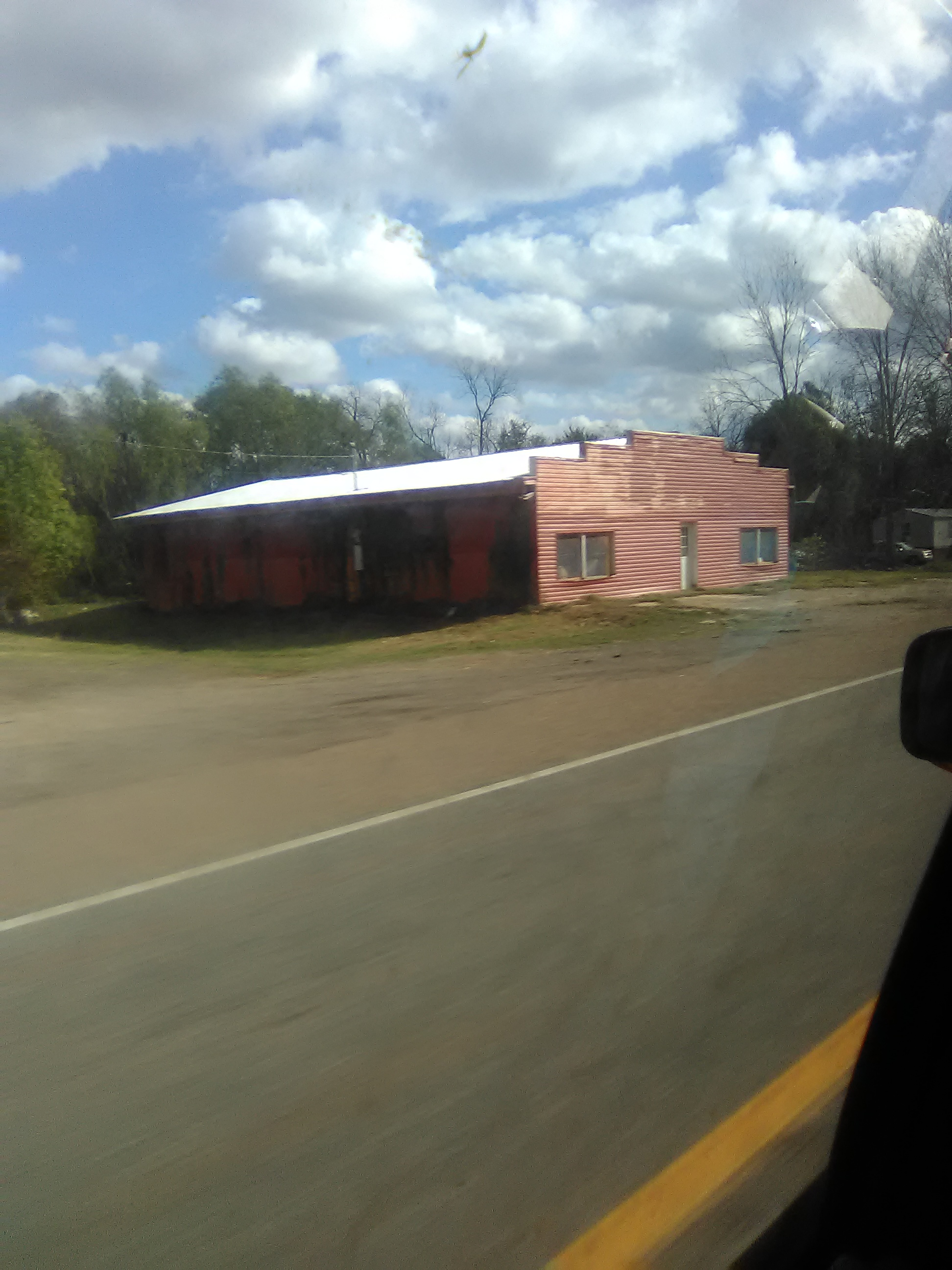
- Abandoned commercial building in 2017

- Location of Natchez in Natchitoches Parish, Louisiana.

- Location of Natchez Natchez, Louisiana (the United States)
- Coordinates: 31°40′32″N 93°02′41″W
- Country: United States
- State: Louisiana
- Parish: Natchitoches

Government
  - Mayor: Patsy Ward Hoover (No Party)

Area
  - Total: 1.06 sq mi (2.74 km^{2})
  - Land: 1.03 sq mi (2.67 km^{2})
  - Water: 0.027 sq mi (0.07 km^{2})
- Elevation: 105 ft (32 m)

Population (2020)
  - Total: 489
  - Rank: NC: 4th
  - Density: 473.7/sq mi (182.91/km^{2})
- Time zone: UTC-6 (CST)
  - Summer (DST): UTC-5 (CDT)
- Area code: 318
- FIPS code: 22-53510
- GNIS feature ID: 543508

Natchez is a village in Natchitoches Parish, Louisiana, United States. As of the 2020 census, Natchez had a population of 489. It is part of the Natchitoches Micropolitan Statistical Area. The village and parish are part of the Cane River National Heritage Area and located on Isle Brevelle.

== History ==
This village is one of the oldest communities in the territory covered by the Louisiana Purchase, and is part of the Cane River National Heritage Area. The Côte Joyeuse (English: Joyous Coast) area was home to the earliest French planters in Louisiana. Some of the plantations (or former plantations) in Natchez include the Oakland Plantation (1818), Cherokee Plantation (c. 1825), Oaklawn Plantation (1830), Cedar Bend Plantation (1850) and the Atahoe Plantation (1873).

The Isle Brevelle church in Natchez was established in 1803 by Augustin Métoyer and church services been held continuously since then. It is the oldest church in the United States that was founded by and for the mixed-Creole people. The church was built by sons of Métoyer and Marie Thérèse Coincoin. Because of the significance of the Créole church's history and its centrality in the life of the community, it is featured on the Louisiana African American Heritage Trail.

== Geography ==
According to the United States Census Bureau, the village has a total area of 1.1 square miles (2.8 km^{2}), all land.

== Demographics ==
Historical population
Census	Pop.	Note	%±
1980	527		—
1990	434		−17.6%
2000	583		34.3%
2010	597		2.4%
2020	489		−18.1%
2025 (est.)	490	▲	0.2%
U.S. Decennial Census

=== 2020 census ===
Natchez racial composition
Race	Number	Percentage
White (non-Hispanic)	15	3.07%
Black or African American (non-Hispanic)	456	93.25%
Other/Mixed	12	2.45%
Hispanic or Latino	6	1.23%

As of the 2020 United States census, there were 489 people, 253 households, and 130 families residing in the village.

=== 2000 census ===
As of the census of 2000, there were 583 people, 227 households, and 140 families residing in the village. The population density was 542.9 inhabitants per square mile (209.6/km^{2}). There were 264 housing units at an average density of 245.9 per square mile (94.9/km^{2}). The racial makeup of the village was 4.80% White, 91.94% African American, 1.20% Native American, 1.03% from other races, and 1.03% from two or more races. Hispanic or Latino of any race were 1.20% of the population.

There were 227 households, out of which 32.2% had children under the age of 18 living with them, 29.5% were married couples living together, 26.9% had a female householder with no husband present, and 38.3% were non-families. 35.2% of all households were made up of individuals, and 9.7% had someone living alone who was 65 years of age or older. The average household size was 2.57 and the average family size was 3.42.

In the village, the population was spread out, with 31.9% under the age of 18, 11.0% from 18 to 24, 26.1% from 25 to 44, 22.3% from 45 to 64, and 8.7% who were 65 years of age or older. The median age was 31 years. For every 100 females, there were 93.7 males. For every 100 females age 18 and over, there were 86.4 males.

The median income for a household in the village was $16,786, and the median income for a family was $19,643. Men had a median income of $20,938 versus $13,167 for Women. The per capita income for the village was $7,625. About 31.5% of families and 39.2% of the population were below the poverty line, including 47.2% of those under age 18 and 58.1% of those age 65 or over.

== Notable people ==
- J. Isaac Friedman (1871–1949), politician, served in the Louisiana House of Representatives from 1908 to 1916; born in Natchez.
- Leon Friedman (1886–1948), politician, served in the Louisiana House of Representatives, from 1932 to 1940; born in Natchez.
- Anne des Cadeaux (unknown-1754), Native American woman from the Adays and early settler of Natchitoches, New France. Buried on Isle Brevelle.

== See also ==
- Cane River National Heritage Area
- Louisiana African American Heritage Trail
- National Register of Historic Places listings in Natchitoches Parish, Louisiana
- Bayou Brevelle
- Isle Brevelle
- Adai Caddo Indian Nation
