= St. Joseph's Catholic Mission at Bayou Derbonne =

Historic catholic church in Montrose, Louisiana, United States

- Location within Louisiana Location within the United States
- Location: Montrose, Louisiana
- Coordinates: 31°32′23.5068″N 92°59′53.45″W
- Area: Montrose Creole Community
- Built: 1800s
- Architect: Francois Brevelle
- Architectural style: Gothic Revival

St. Joseph's Catholic Mission at Bayou Derbonne is a historic Catholic mission founded in the 1800s along the banks of Bayou Derbonne near Montrose and Isle Brevelle in Natchitoches Parish, Louisiana, serving the Montrose and Cloutierville Creole community. It was the cultural and religious center of the area's Louisiana Creole people, predominantly of French descent.

== Location ==
The remnants of the church and cemetery are located on Highway 493 on the banks of Bayou Derbonne near the Cane River Waterway Commission. Nearby are the historic Magnolia Plantation (Derry, Louisiana) and Melrose Plantation.

== History ==
The chapel was founded by French Creole families in the 1800s as a mission of St. Augustine Catholic Parish Church of Isle Brevelle. During this period, St. Augustine Catholic Parish Church founded 3 other missions: St. Anne Church (Spanish Lake) (serving the Adai Caddo Indians of Louisiana), St. Charles Chapel at Bermuda, and St. Anne Chapel at Old River.

Notable Creole founding and patron families include Rachal, Longlois, Lacaze, Metoyer and Brevelle. The mission was initially under the Roman Catholic Diocese of Natchitoches, which is now part of the Diocese of Alexandria.

== Notable places ==
- Natchitoches, Louisiana
- Red River of the South
- Cane River
- Bayou Brevelle

== Notable people ==
- Clementine Hunter (c. 1887–1988), a self-taught folk artist, she lived at the Melrose Plantation and painted this chapel and old river.
- Jean Baptiste Brevelle (1698-1754), early 18th century explorer, trader and soldier of Fort Saint Jean Baptiste des Natchitoches.
- Marie Thérèse Coincoin (1742–1816), a planter, former slave turned slave owner and businesswoman.
- Anne des Cadeaux (unknown–1754), former Native American slave, mother of Jean Baptiste Brevelle II, and buried on Isle Brevelle.
- Billie Stroud (1919–2010), a self-taught folk artist, used this chapel, Kisatchie Bayou, and Brevelle Bayou as subject of her work and spent time there.

== See also ==
- Roman Catholic Diocese of Alexandria in Louisiana
- St. Augustine Catholic Church and Cemetery (Natchez, Louisiana)
- St. Genevieve Catholic Church of Brouillette
- St. Anne Church (Spanish Lake)
