= St. Charles Chapel at Bermuda =

Historic catholic chapel in Natchitoches Parish, Louisiana, United States

- Location within Louisiana Location within the United States
- 31°39′29″N 93°00′00″W
- Location: 3659 Old River Rd, Natchitoches, Louisiana 71457

History
- Built: 1910

Site notes
- Area: Bermuda Community, Louisiana
- Architect: Jean Brevelle
- Architectural style: Gothic Revival

St. Charles Chapel at Bermuda is a historic Catholic chapel founded in the early 1900s along the banks of the Cane River on Isle Brevelle in Natchitoches Parish serving the unincorporated community of Bermuda, Louisiana. It is the cultural and religious center of the area's Louisiana Creole people, predominantly of French descent.

== Location ==
The chapel is located on LA 119 near the Atahoe Plantation on the banks of the Cane River south of Natchez, Louisiana.

Like nearby Old River and Bayou Brevelle, the Cane River was once the Red River, a major trade route for early colonists and Native Americans.

== History ==
The chapel was founded by French Creole families in the 1900s as a mission of St. Augustine Catholic Parish Church of Isle Brevelle. During this period, St. Augustine Catholic Parish Church founded 3 other missions: St. Anne Church (Spanish Lake) (serving the Adai Caddo Indians of Louisiana), St. Joseph's Catholic Mission at Bayou Derbonne, and St. Anne Chapel at Old River.

Notable Creole founding and patron families include Rachal, Longlois, Lacaze, Metoyer and Brevelle. The mission was initially under the Roman Catholic Diocese of Natchitoches, which is now part of the Diocese of Alexandria.

== St. Augustine Historical Society ==
The building is owned by the St. Augustine Catholic Church and has been given for use to the St. Augustine Historical Society.

== Notable people ==
- Jean Baptiste Brevelle (1698-1754), early 18th century explorer, trader and soldier of Fort Saint Jean Baptiste des Natchitoches. Father of the namesake of Isle Brevelle.

== See also ==
- Roman Catholic Diocese of Alexandria in Louisiana
- St. Genevieve Catholic Church of Brouillette
