= St. Anne Chapel at Old River =

Historic church, cemetery in the US

- Location within Louisiana Location within the United States
- 31°38′27″N 93°03′58″W
- Location: 3659 Old River Rd, Natchitoches, Louisiana 71457

History
- Built: 1800s

Site notes
- Area: Old River Community, Louisiana

St. Anne Chapel at Old River is a historic Catholic chapel founded in the 1800s along the banks of Old River near Cypress and Isle Brevelle in Natchitoches Parish, Louisiana, serving the Old River community. It is the cultural and religious center of the area's Louisiana Creole people, predominantly of French descent.

== Location ==
The church and cemetery are located Old River Road (Parish Road 615) on the banks of Old River near Kisatchie Bayou at the Old River Creole community near Natchez, Louisiana.

Like nearby Cane River and Bayou Brevelle, Old River was once the Red River.

== History ==
The chapel was founded by French Creole families in the 1800s as a mission of St. Augustine Catholic Parish Church of Isle Brevelle. During this period, St. Augustine Catholic Parish Church founded 3 other missions: St. Anne Church (Spanish Lake) (serving the Adai Caddo Indians of Louisiana), St. Joseph's Catholic Mission at Bayou Derbonne, and St. Charles Chapel at Bermuda.

Notable Creole founding and patron families include Rachal, Longlois, Lacaze, Metoyer and Brevelle. The mission was initially under the Roman Catholic Diocese of Natchitoches, which is now part of the Diocese of Alexandria.

== Notable people ==
- Clementine Hunter (c. 1887–1988), self-taught folk artist, she lived at the Melrose Plantation and painted this chapel and old river.
- Jean Baptiste Brevelle (1698-1754), early 18th century explorer, trader and soldier of Fort Saint Jean Baptiste des Natchitoches.
- Billie Stroud (1919–2010), self-taught folk artist, used this chapel, Kisatchie Bayou, and Brevelle Bayou as subject of her work and spent time there.

== See also ==
- St. Genevieve Catholic Church of Brouillette
