= St. Anne Church (Spanish Lake) =

Historic church in Louisiana, US

- St. Anne Catholic Church (Spanish Lake)
- U.S. National Register of Historic Places
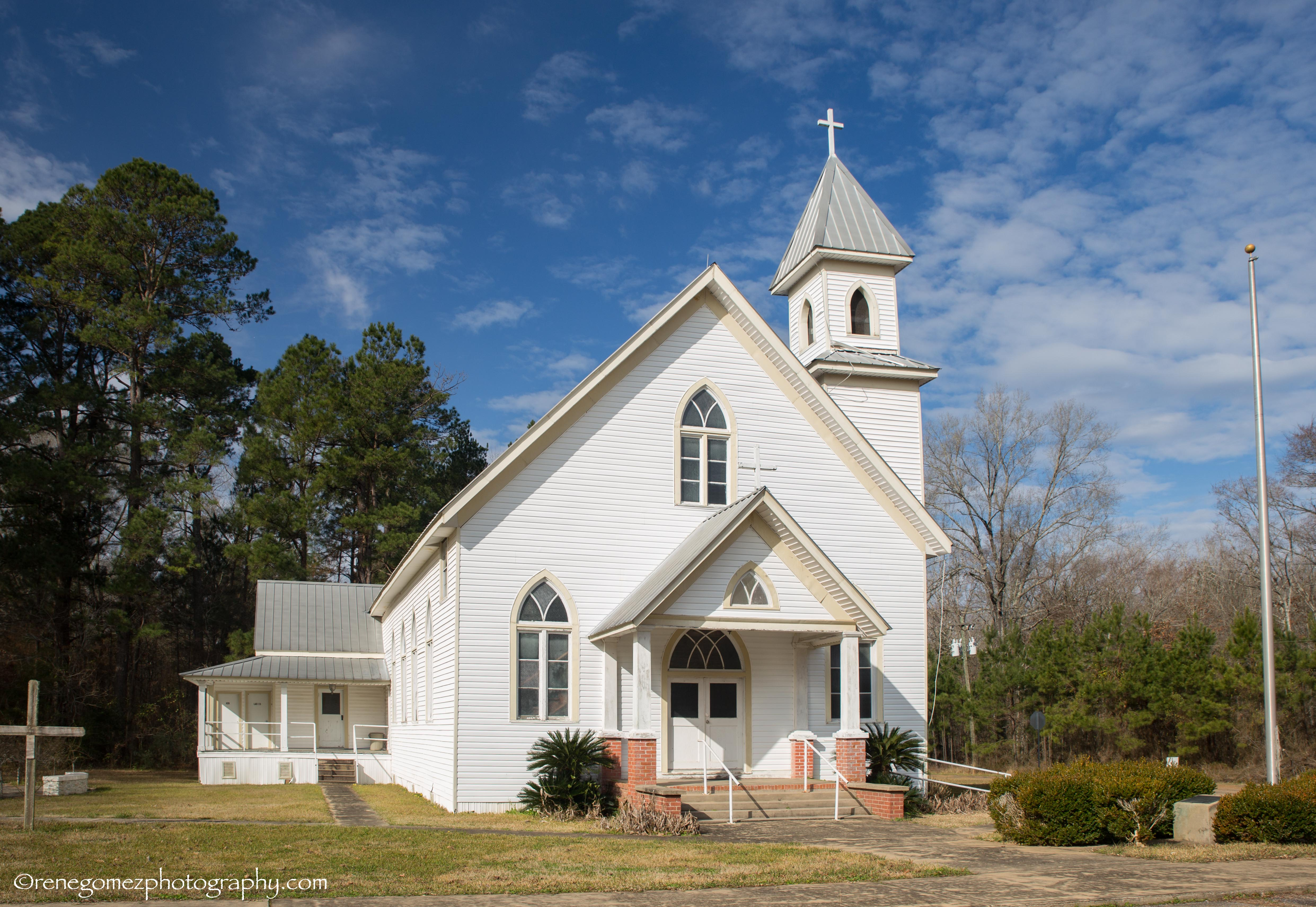

- Location within Louisiana Location within the United States
- Location: Southwest corner of the intersection of LA 485 and Blosmoore Road, in vicinity of Robeline, Louisiana
- Coordinates: 31.786359°N 93.285663°W
- Area: less than one acre
- Built: 1916
- Architectural style: Late Gothic Revival
- NRHP reference No.: 94001271
- Added to NRHP: October 28, 1994

The St. Anne Church (Spanish Lake) in the vicinity of Robeline, Louisiana is a historic church founded in the 1800s as a mission from the St. Augustine Parish Church of Isle Brevelle. The current building was built in 1916. It is located at the southwest corner of the intersection of LA 485 and Blosmoore Road. It was added to the National Register in 1994.

It was deemed notable "because it is a rare example of the Gothic Revival style within Natchitoches Parish."

== History ==
In the 18th century, Spanish Lake was known as Laguna de los Adaes, so named because the Adai Indians lived around it. After the Spanish left in 1773 due to the closure of the Presidio at Los Adaes (the area was put under the jurisdiction of Fort St. Jean Baptiste des Natchitoches), the community became known as Spanish Lake.

On March 11, 1856, the mission of St. Augustine at Isle Brevelle was decreed by Bishop Auguste Martin, the first Bishop of the Roman Catholic Diocese of Natchitoches, to be a parish in its own right and assigned his brother, Fr. Francois Martin to be its first resident pastor. Now as a Parish Church, St. Augustine (also known as the Isle Brevelle Church) expanded and founded four other missions in the area, St. Charles Chapel at Bermuda, St. Joseph's Catholic Mission at Bayou Derbonne, St. Anne Chapel at Old River, and St. Anne's at Spanish Lake serving the Adai Caddo Indians of Louisiana. Notable Creole founding and patron families include Metoyer, Rachal, Longlois, Lacaze and Brevelle.

After a reorganization in the Roman Catholic Church, the Natchitoches Diocese became the Alexandria Diocese. The St. Anne mission was transferred under the St. Francis of Assisi Church, Powhatan.

== Notable people ==
- Jean Baptiste Brevelle (1698-1754), early 18th century explorer, trader and soldier of Fort Saint Jean Baptiste des Natchitoches. Father of the namesake of Isle Brevelle and patron family of the St. Augustine Church (Isle Brevelle) and St. Anne Church (Spanish Lake).

== See also ==
- Natchitoches, Louisiana
- Cane River Creole National Historical Park
- El Camino Real de los Tejas National Historic Trail
- St. Genevieve Catholic Church of Brouillette
