= St. Augustine Catholic Church and Cemetery (Natchez, Louisiana) =

Historic church in Louisiana, United States

- U.S. National Register of Historic Places
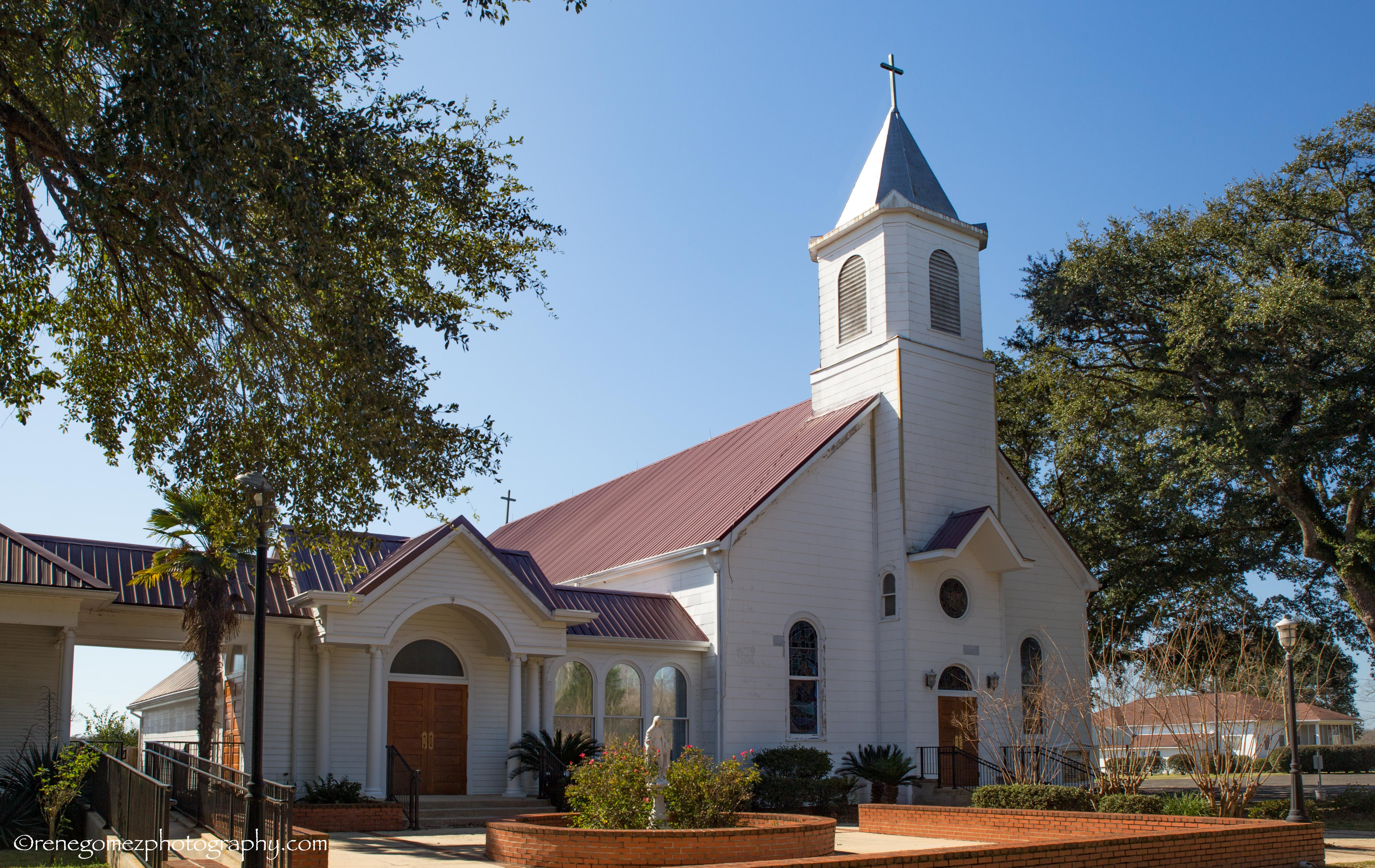
- The church in 2019

- Location within Louisiana Location within the United States
- Location: 2262 Louisiana Highway 484, Natchez, Louisiana
- Coordinates: 31°35′37″N 92°58′22″W
- Built: 1917
- Website: staugustinecaneriver.com
- NRHP reference No.: 14000679
- Added to NRHP: September 24, 2014

St. Augustine Catholic Church and Cemetery, or the Isle Brevelle Church, is a historic Catholic parish property founded in 1829 near Melrose, Natchitoches Parish, Louisiana. It is the cultural center of the Cane River area's historic French, Spanish, Native American and Black Creole community. It is also the oldest surviving Black Catholic church in the United States.

Established as a mission church by Louisiana Creole Nicolas Augustin Metoyer, St. Augustine is celebrated as the first church in Louisiana to be built by and for free people of color. It is also among the oldest churches founded and built by and for African Americans.

The church and cemetery are within the Cane River National Heritage Area, and are listed on the National Register of Historic Places. Because of its significance in Catholic and Creole history, St. Augustine also is a marked destination on the Louisiana African American Heritage Trail.

== History ==
=== 19th century ===
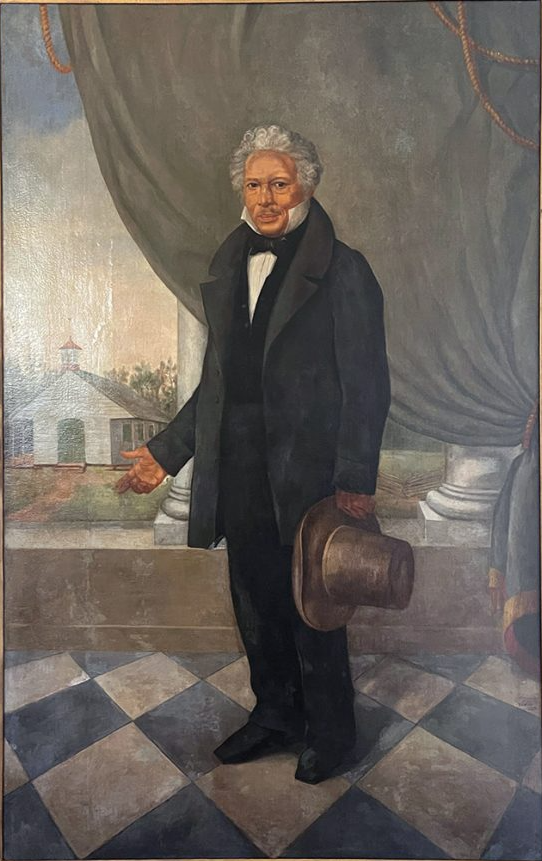
Nicholas Augustin Metoyer founder of Church

Tradition holds that the church was established by Nicolas Augustin Metoyer in 1803 and that services have been held continuously since then. Historical records challenge the local lore. Parish records document the founding of the Chapel of St. Augustine "as a mission of the church of St. François of Natchitoches" in July 1829, shortly after the church was constructed. The mission was recognized in 1856 as a parish in its own right, and authorized a resident priest.

When Fr Jean Baptiste Blanc consecrated the chapel for religious use (19 July 1829), he reported that it had been "erected on Isle Brevelle on the plantation of Sieur Augustin Metoyer through the care and generosity of the above-named Augustin Metoyer, aided by Louis Metoyer, his brother. ... The said chapel ... having been dedicated to St. Augustine, shall be considered as under the protection of this great doctor." Tradition also describes the role of Augustin's brother Louis (founder of the nearby Melrose Plantation, a National Historic Landmark ), as the chapel's designer and builder.

The Church of St. Augustine is distinctive among Southern churches of all denominations for its racial role reversals. Surviving pew records show that the front seats were occupied by the Créole de couleur Metoyer family, who built the chapel. Seated behind them were the families of prominent white planters and other Creoles within the community with surnames Blanchard, Brevelle, Garcia, Landry, and Lemoine.

On March 11, 1856, the mission of St. Augustine at Isle Brevelle was decreed by Bishop Auguste Marie Martin of Natchitoches to be a parish in its own right, and assigned Fr Francois Martin to be its first resident pastor. St. Augustine expanded to serve four other churches in the area: St. Charles Chapel at Bermuda, St. Anne Church (Spanish Lake) (serving the Adai Caddo Indians of Louisiana), St. Joseph's Catholic Mission at Bayou Derbonne, and St. Anne Chapel at Old River.

The original St. Augustine structure has not survived. Union forces are said to have torched it during the Red River campaign of May 1864. After the Civil War, its congregation was almost exclusively people of color.

=== 20th century ===
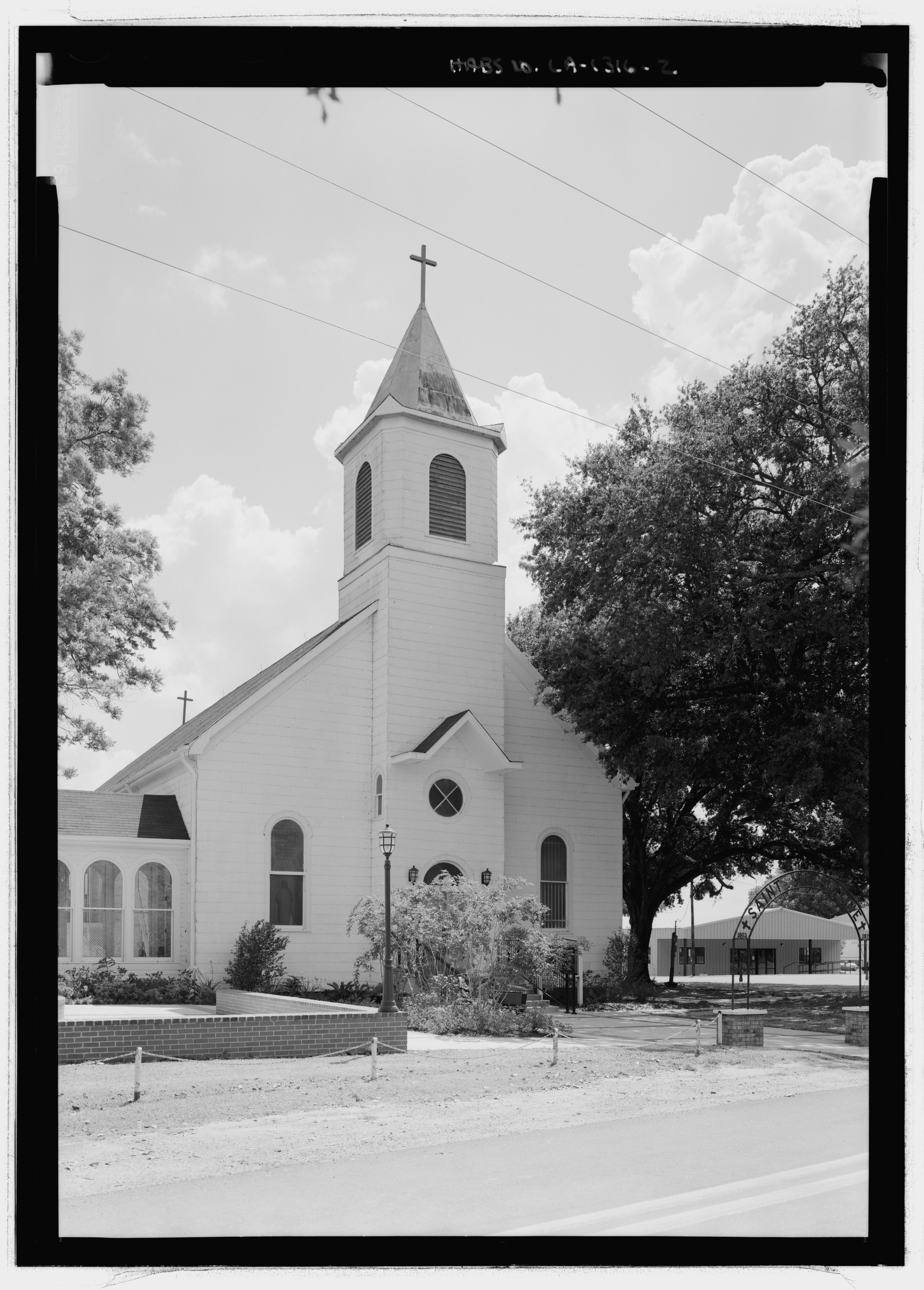
View of the church from the Historic American Buildings Survey, date unknown

A second church burned in the early 1900s. It was replaced by the present-day church building, which was completed in 1917. Tradition holds that early furnishings included paintings of patron saints Augustine and Louis, in honor of the Metoyer brothers, as well as an altar brought from Europe by other family members. The original bell that hung in the belfry above the vestibule is said to be the one still in use. An image of the original church survives as a backdrop in the contemporary oil portrait of its founder that hangs in the church today.

An oil painting titled Papa Augustin Metoyer (c. 1836) has hung in the church since the 1970s, featuring a portrait of Nicolas Augustin Metoyer posing in a Prince Albert coat in front of green drapery. This painting had been part of the Melrose Planation and went up for auction in the 1970s, the pastor of the church brought the oldest descendants of Nicolas Augustin Metoyer to the auction and they pleaded to be allowed to purchase the painting for the Isle Brevelle community and for display in the church.

For many years an annual festival for the Isle Brevelle community has been held at St. Augustine Church.

== Representation in other media ==
- Elizabeth Shown Mills's historical novel, Isle of Canes, draws upon her research in both family tradition and primary sources. She explores the founding of St. Augustine and the character of the religious leadership of the Isle Brevelle community in Creole Louisiana.
- The Church is depicted in the 1982 historical romantic drama Cane River, which was lost for decades before being rediscovered a distributed digitally and in theaters beginning in 2020.

== See also ==
- National Register of Historic Places listings in Natchitoches Parish, Louisiana
- Isle Brevelle
- Cane River
- Bayou Brevelle
- Melrose Plantation
- Anne des Cadeaux
- Natchitoches Parish

== Notable people ==
- Clementine Hunter (c. 1887–1988), self-taught folk artist, she lived at the Melrose Plantation within Isle Brevelle and attended mass at St. Augustine.
- Marie Thérèse Coincoin (1742–1816), a planter, former slave turned slave owner, and businesswoman. Her sons were the architect and patron families of St. Augustine.
- Anne des Cadeaux (unknown–1754), former Native American slave, mother of Jean Baptiste Brevelle II, and buried on Isle Brevelle at the Brevelle Plantation. St. Augustine is built on her family's Spanish land grant. Her descendants were patron families of St. Augustine.
- Jean Baptiste Brevelle (1698-1754), early 18th century explorer, trader and soldier of Fort Saint Jean Baptiste des Natchitoches. Husband of Anne des Cadeaux and father of the namesake of Isle Brevelle.
- Robert Brevelle (born 1977), venture capitalist and tribal councilman of the nearby Adai Caddo Indian Nation, is a lineal descendant of Isle Brevelle founder and patron of St. Augustine.
