= Louis Juchereau de St. Denis =

French Canadian soldier and explorer (1676–1744)

- Born: September 17, 1676; Beauport, Canada
- Died: June 11, 1744 (aged 67); Natchitoches, Louisiana
- Spouse: Marie-Manuela
- Children: 7
- Military career
- Allegiance: Kingdom of France
- Branch: Troupes de la Marine
- Service years: 1700 - 1707; 1713 - 1744
- Rank: Lieutenant
- Commands: Fort De La Boulaye; Fort St. Jean Baptiste
- Conflicts: War of the Quadruple Alliance; Natchez revolt
- Awards: Order of Saint Louis

Louis Antoine Juchereau de St. Denis (French: Louis Juchereau de Saint-Denis; September 17, 1676 – June 11, 1744) was a French Canadian soldier and explorer best known for his exploration and development of the Louisiana (New France) and Spanish Texas regions. He commanded a small garrison at Fort de la Boulaye on the lower Mississippi River, built in 1700, and founded Fort St Jean Baptiste de Natchitoches in northern La Louisiane, as they called the French colony.

== Early life and education ==
St. Denis was born at Beauport, New France (Quebec), the eleventh of the twelve children of Nicolas Juchereau (1627–1692), Seigneur du Chesnay and Saint-Roch-des-Aulnaies; member of the Sovereign Council of New France. His paternal grandfather was the elder brother of Noël Juchereau des Chatelets. His mother, Marie Thérèse Giffard de Beauport, was the daughter of Robert Giffard de Moncel, Sieur de Moncel à Autheuil, and the 1st Seigneur of Beauport, Quebec. His brother was the grandfather of Louis Barbe Juchereau de Saint-Denys (1740–1833), 1st Marquis de Saint-Denys, ancestor of Marie-Jean-Léon, Marquis d'Hervey de Saint Denys. His sister was Charlotte-Françoise Juchereau de St. Denis, the fief holder and business person.

By decision of his parents, St. Denis emigrated temporarily to France to acquire a higher level of education. In late 1699, St. Denis joined the second expedition of Pierre Le Moyne, Sieur d'Iberville (his first cousin), which departed from La Rochelle and travelled to Louisiana. St. Denis commanded a small garrison at Fort de La Boulaye, named for a commune in the Bourgogne region of France. The fort was constructed in 1700 on the Mississippi River about 20 kilometers below the future development of New Orleans; it was designed to protect French interests against the Spanish and English in the region. St. Denis also commanded a fort at Biloxi Bay, where the French founded another settlement. St. Denis also explored to the west of the bay and up the Mississippi River, where he journeyed to the lower Red River. These expeditions to the northern areas allowed him meet the Karankawa and Caddo tribes, from whom he learned wilderness skills specific to the area.

In September 1713, Antoine Laumet de La Mothe, Sieur de Cadillac sent St. Denis and a group of French marines from Mobile to the Red River, where they established a French outpost and fort. The intent was to protect the territorial boundaries of French-Louisiana and halt the eastward expansion of the Spaniards, whose local government was based on the Rio Grande in south Texas. The Spaniards were building Fort Los Adaes about 15 miles west of Natchitoches, near the present town of Robeline, LA. St. Denis arrived in central Louisiana at what is now Natchitoches later in 1713 and built Fort St. Jean Baptiste de Natchitoches as a trading post along the banks of the Red River, whose course later changed and the result became the Cane River. He traded with the Caddo Nation there and freely sold them guns; additionally, St. Denis developed a somewhat friendly relationship with the nearby Spaniards, despite the objections of the French governorship. St. Denis and his men learned many hunting and trapping skills from the Caddo Indians, who were welcoming and friendly. St. Denis became fluent in the Caddo language, as well as the fictive kinship relationships that supported peace and trade.

Soon after founding Natchitoches in 1714, St. Denis went to the territory of the Hasinai Confederacy, having been dispatched by Cadillac who had received a letter from Francisco Hidalgo containing information on the local Caddo Indians and inviting the French to trade there. After leaving these lands, Denis traveled to the Rio Grande, where visited the Spanish outposts located along the river. However, Commander Diego Ramón captured Denis and arrested him at San Juan Bautista, Coahuila for having violated Spanish trade "restrictions". He confiscated his goods while waiting for the Mexico City authorities to decide how a foreigner with such charges should be treated. In the meantime, St. Denis courted the Ramón's step-granddaughter, Manuela Sanchez-Navarro, a descendant of the conquistadors of the provinces of Nueva Vizcaya and Nuevo León, Mexico, and got her to promise to marry him. Following the orders of Mexico City, Ramon ordered him to go to that city to stand trial. However, St. Denis managed to defend his case and the city authorities suggested him to lead the Domingo Ramón expedition to East Texas, whose purpose was the founding of missions, with the title of commissary officer.

So, St. Denis returned to San Juan Bautista and in the years 1716–1717 he traveled to eastern Texas to lead the Domingo Ramon expedition. Finally, the expedition founded six missions and a presidio. He returned to San Juan Bautista in April 1717. However, at this time, Louis XIV died and the War of the Spanish Succession came to an end. This led to the breakdown of relations between France and Spain and St. Denis left the Spanish America and returned to La Louisiane. In February 1719 the French transferred St. Denis to Mexico City. However, his stay in New Spain would have favored his capture and sending to a Spanish prison, so he decided to flee and emigrate to Natchitoches. The Spanish officers accepted his departure and allowed his wife, Manuela, to emigrate with him in 1721. Denis and Manuela settled at Le Poste des Cadodaquious, a French fort in Texarkana, Texas, where they lived the last years of their lives. In 1722, St. Denis was appointed commandant of Fort St. Jean Baptiste des Natchitoches.

== Later life ==
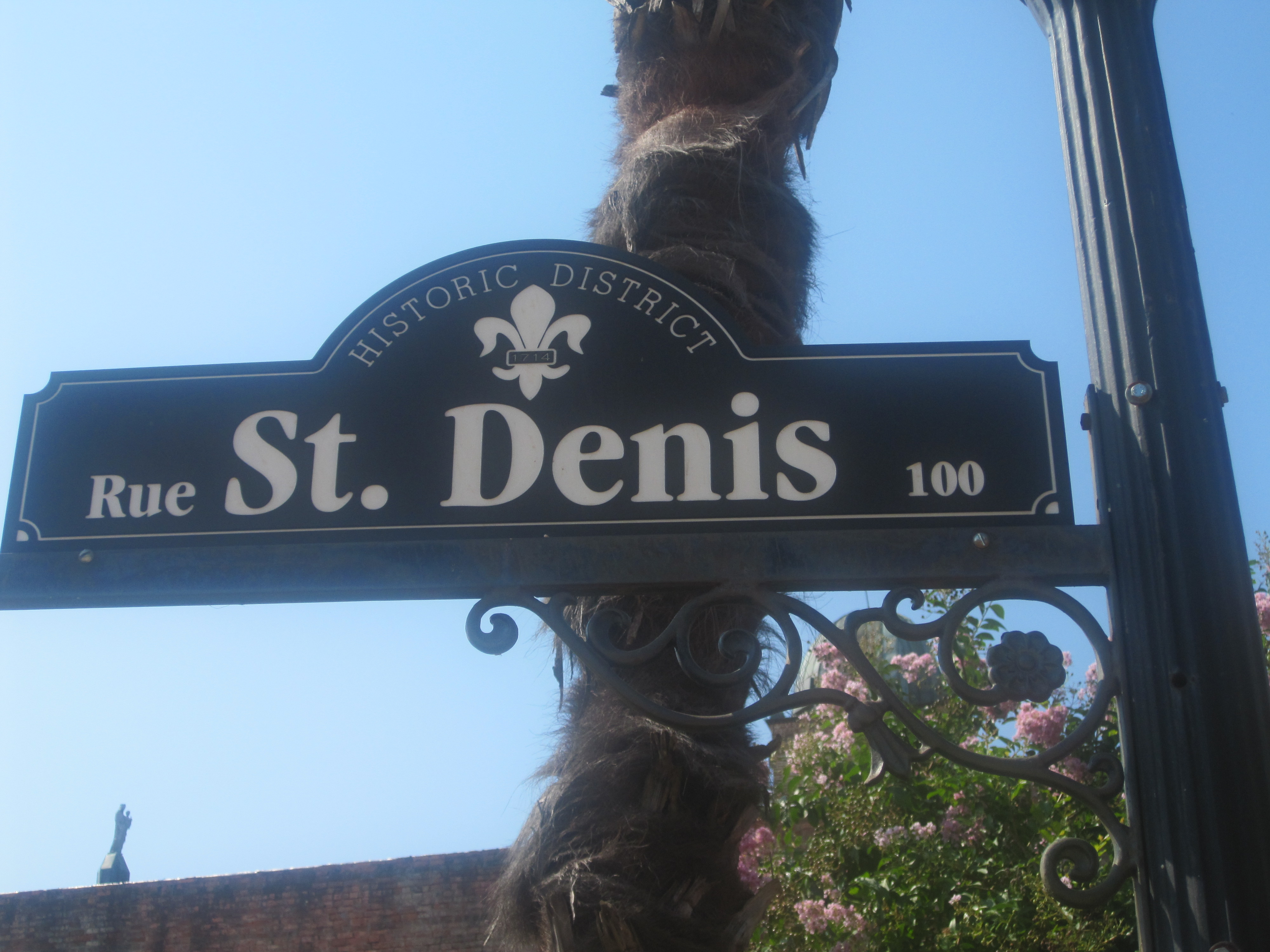
St. Denis Street in the historic district of Natchitoches

During the last few years of his life, St. Denis did not consider himself capable of continuing to maintain command of Natchitoches, as he explained to Jean-Frédéric Phélypeaux, comte de Maurepas through a letter he sent him on 10 January 1743. Thus, he asked him to leave the post and move to New Spain with his family. However, his request was rejected. St. Denis ended his life at Natchitoches on 11 June 1744.

== Personal life and family ==
In early 1716, Denis married Manuela Sánchez Navarro y Gomes Mascorro and they had five children. Manuela and his children survived his death. After the time of his death, it was rumored that his wife became the richest woman west of the Mississippi River.

As St. Denis' two sons did not father any children of their own, his daughters carried his posterity.

St. Denis' descendants include Ada Simond, a Texan public health activist and historian.

== Controversy ==
Denis was a very questionable character since the time when he commanded Natchitoches, as the Spanish authorities were suspicious of their possible links with the government of France. They believed that he was possibly a secret agent of that country. However, St. Denis argued that he wanted to become a Spanish citizen, and his Spanish wife was proof.

== Legacy ==
St. Denis played an important role in the generalization of knowledge about the physical geography of both the French and Spanish Empires in North America, as well as fostering relations between the European settlements in both areas. However, Denis also favored the normalization of the smuggling trade on the frontier between Texas and Louisiana.

== See also ==
- Natchitoches Parish
- Isle Brevelle
- Cane River
- Natchitoches, Louisiana
- Anne des Cadeaux
- Caddo
- Adai Caddo Indians of Louisiana
