= St. Genevieve Catholic Church of Brouillette =

Church and cemetery in Louisiana, US

- Location within Louisiana Location within the United States
- Location: 4052 Hwy 452, Marksville, Louisiana 71351
- Coordinates: 31°12′38″N 92°01′39″W
- Area: Brouillette Community, Louisiana
- Built: 1953
- Added to NRHP: January 1, 2024

St. Genevieve Catholic Church and Cemetery of Brouillette is a historic Catholic Church founded in the 1800s along the banks of the Red River of the South near Marksville, Louisiana, United States, serving the Brouillette community. The current structure was built in the 1950s. It is the cultural center of the area's historic Louisiana Creole people, predominantly of French descent.

== Location ==
The church is located at the intersection of Levee Road and Preston Road (LA HWY 452) in the Brouillette community of Marksville, Louisiana. It is located just off the levee of the Red River adjacent to the United States Army Corps of Engineers and Red River Waterway Commission's Brouillette Recreation Area.

== History ==
The church was founded on the banks of the Red River by French Creole families in the 1800s. Notable founding and patron families include Deville, Brevelle, Gaspard, Dupuy, Ponthier, Lacombe, Bordelon, Laborde, and Lachney, whose names appear prominently on the church's entrance. The parish church is part of the Diocese of Alexandria and includes an iconic cemetery with above-ground tombs.

== Notable people ==
- Jean Baptiste Brevelle (1698-1754), early 18th century explorer, trader and soldier of Fort Saint Jean Baptiste des Natchitoches, the first European settlement in the area. Father of the namesake of nearby Isle Brevelle and ancestor of the founders of St. Genevieve Catholic Church.
- Anne des Cadeaux

== See also ==
- Avoyelles Parish, Louisiana
- St. Anne Chapel at Old River
- St. Anne Church (Spanish Lake)
