= Anne des Cadeaux =

Native American woman from Louisiana (died 1754)

- Born: Unknown; Natchitoches Parish, Caddo Village of the Adays, Louisiana Colony, New France
- Died: 1754; Isle Brevelle, Natchitoches Parish, Louisiana
- Other names: Anne Marie des Cadeaux, Marie Anne des Cadeaux, Anne of the Caddos, Anne des Cadeaux Brevelle, Anne Brevelle
- Spouse: Jean Baptiste Brevelle (m. 1736; died 1754)
- Children: 2

Anne des Cadeaux (unknown—1754), was a Native American active in early colonial Louisiana, and was from one of the early Louisiana Creole families. She was a devout Catholic, and was enslaved but later gained her freedom.

== Early life and family ==
Anne was born in an Adai Indian village near the colonial Louisiana post of Fort St. Jean Baptiste des Natchitoches, in what would later become the colonial Spanish presidio of Los Adaes and capital of Tejas. This historic site is located near present-day Robeline and the El Camino Real (English: The King’s Highway), which is part of Louisiana Scenic Byway (LA-6) and Spanish Lake Highway (LA-485).

Her birth name is unknown and little is known of Anne's childhood. While the Spanish colonists referred to her people as Adais (various spellings), the French referred to her people as the Natao, as named by Pierre le Moyne d'Iberville in 1699. Anne later became the slave of Jean Baptiste Brevelle (French: Brevel), a Parisian-born trader, explorer, and one of the first soldiers garrisoned at Fort St. Jean Baptiste des Natchitoches. Jean so loved Anne that he obtained permission from Fort Commandant Louis Antoine Juchereau de St. Denis to marry her. After the publication of three banns, Jean and Anne were married in 1736 in the Catholic Church in Natchitoches. Anne bore two children, who would become the first Creoles and settlers of Isle Brevelle.

== Life as a free woman ==
Unlike many other Native American wives of European men of that era, her marriage and children were recognized by the Catholic Church and French colonial government, as opposed to being treated as slaves. She earned the respect of the European colonists by learning how to read and write and by being fully initiated into the Catholic Church after learning the precepts of Christianity. Other Native wives including Anne's godmother Angelique, the widow of St. Denis's servant, Charles Dumont, did not know how to read or write. That respect allowed her children, although being metis (mixed race, half Indian), to be recognized as full citizens.

Anne was named for Saint Anne, the mother of the Virgin Mother and grandmother of Jesus. Also known as Anne Marie des Cadeaux, her name reflects her and the other colonists’ faith and love of the Virgin Mary and the doctrine of Immaculate Conception. St. Anne is the name of the local church and cemetery that were part of the Roman Catholic Diocese of Natchitoches (now the Diocese of Alexandria) and the Basilica of Immaculate Conception (previously St. Mary's). Anne and her son's baptisms are amongst the first entries in the oldest Catholic Registry of Louisiana.

Her husband's military and trade assignments took them to various Spanish and French settlements throughout present-day Louisiana, Arkansas, Texas, and Oklahoma including Le Poste des Cadodaquious (Le Posts des Nassonites) in today's Bowie and Red River County, Texas. The site is the first European settlement in the area and was garrisoned by a detachment from Fort St. Jean Baptiste des Natchitoches. They traveled along the Red, Sabine, and Trinity Rivers where they lived among and traded with the Natchitoches, Hasinai, Nasoni, Yatasi, Tawakoni and Kadohadacho Indians.

Anne died in 1754 on Isle Brevelle near Bayou Brevelle.

== Legacy ==
Anne's children married into prominent European families. Her son, Jean Baptiste Brevelle Jr., with his knowledge of various Caddo languages and customs, worked as the famed translator, arbitrator, explorer, and soldier for the French and Spanish crowns. For his service, he was issued a large land grant of fertile farmland south of Natchitoches along the Cane River that the Catholic Church called paradise on earth. John Sibley, an Indian Agent and council to Louisiana's first U.S. Governor, in 1804 reported to the U.S. Congress that the Isle Brevelle was named for its earliest settler, Jean Baptiste Brevelle Jr.

The former Brevelle Plantation (now Isle Brevelle) is home to the Cane River Creole Historical Area and is the birthplace of Creole culture. In Louisiana, the term Creole is defined as native-born people of ethnic European background mixed with Native American and/or African. Anne is regarded as one of the most well-documented Native American women of early colonial Louisiana. Her story and that of both of her Creole children are documented in the records of the Catholic Church and in interviews conducted by Indian Agent John Sibley after the Louisiana Purchase which are on file in the American State Papers, Library of Congress, and the Annals of Congress.

Anne explored the frontier lands of New France and New Spain with her family. St. Augustine Parish Church, Bayou Brevelle, and Isle Brevelle in Natchitoches Parish and Brevelle Lake in Red River County, Texas are named for this family.

"The Caddo left their names, art, and culture in Louisiana. Several colonial European families claim Caddoan ancestors: Grappes, Brevelles, Balthazars, and others."

== Notable relatives ==
- Seraphin Benjamin Brevelle (1819–1900), farmer and soldier born in Natchitoches but relocated to Avoyelles Parish after the Civil War, is a lineal descendant of Anne des Cadeaux.
- Villere Pierre Brevelle (1899–1977), owner of the historic Brevelle Farm along the Red River in Brouillette, Louisiana, is a lineal descendant of Anne des Cadeaux. His name and the names of several of his children are on the dedication fencing at St. Genevieve Catholic Church.
- Robert Brevelle (born 1977), entrepreneur, venture capitalist and professor, is a lineal descendant of Anne des Cadeaux. He is a tribal councilman of the Adai Caddo Indian Nation of Louisiana.

== See also ==
- Adai Caddo Indian Nation of Louisiana
- Louisiana Purchase
- Cane River (film)
- National Register of Historic Places listings in Natchitoches Parish, Louisiana
