= Bayou Brevelle =

Stream in Natchitoches Parish, LA

Bayou Brevelle Brevelle Bayou, Bayou des Jean Baptiste Brevelle
- Bayou Brevelle

Location
- Country: United States
- State: Louisiana
- Parish: Natchitoches

Physical characteristics
- Source: Old River, Kisatchie Bayou, Little River, Cane River
- Mouth
  - coordinates: 31°34′30″N 92°58′56″W
- Length: 18 miles (29 km)

Bayou Brevelle is a series of interconnected, natural waterways totaling over 18 miles in length in Natchitoches Parish, Louisiana. Its main channel is at Old River and Kisatchie Bayou at Montrose to Natchez near the Cane River. During heavy rains or floods, Bayou Brevelle joins the Cane River. The bayou is flanked by Interstate 49 on the west and the Cane River on the east, and is one of the many waterways on Isle Brevelle.

== History ==
The area was inhabited since time immemorial by tribes of the Caddo Confederacy including the Adai, Natchitoches, Yatasi, and Doustioni. Over the past 300 hundred years, the area has changed dramatically due to the Great Raft and its subsequent removal. Periodic flooding over the centuries and the deposit of river silt has made the area one of the most fertile farmlands in Louisiana.

Like nearby Cane River and Old River, Bayou Brevelle was once the Red River.

The name Brevelle is from the French (Brevel and Breville) and is an ancient surname originating in the 1200s Normandy region of France from the Fief of Breville. The bayou is named after metis (french and native american) Jean Baptiste Brevelle II, the area's earliest settler and the 18th-century explorer and soldier of the Natchitoches Militia at Fort St. Jean Baptiste. He is the son of Jean Baptiste Brevelle, a Parisian-born trader and explorer, and his Adai (French: Natao) Caddo Indian wife, Anne des Cadeaux. The baptism of Jean Baptiste Brevelle II. is recorded on May 20, 1736 in the oldest Catholic Registry in the Louisiana colony. Jean Baptiste Brevelle II was granted Isle Brevelle and the land surrounding Bayou Brevelle by David Pain, the subdelegate at Natchitoches in 1765 for his service to the French and Spanish crowns as a Caddo Indian translator and explorer of Arkansas, Oklahoma, Texas, and New Mexico.

Jean Baptiste Brevelle II, his mother, and his father are buried at the old Brevelle Plantation along Bayou Brevelle south of the city of Natchitoches, Louisiana.

== Creole culture ==
Along the banks of Bayou Brevelle lies the birthplace of Creole where the mixture of French, Spanish, African, and Native American cultures created a unique community and people. The Isle of Brevelle community, the original and oldest Creole community in Louisiana, was isolated until World War II, after which the community saw significant outward migration. The St. Augustine Catholic Church Fair, held annually, still draws back many former members of the community.

There are several noteworthy examples of Creole architecture in the area. One example is the Badin-Roque House.

Bayou Brevelle continues to be the inspiration and subject of Creole paintings, photography, and literature.

== Notable places ==
- Cherokee Plantation (Natchez, Louisiana)
- Oakland Plantation (Natchitoches Parish, Louisiana)
- Magnolia Plantation (Derry, Louisiana)
- Melrose Plantation
- St. Augustine Catholic Church and Cemetery (Natchez, Louisiana)
- St. Anne Chapel at Old River

== Representation in literary work ==
- Natchitoches and Louisiana’s Timeless Cane River (2002): Philip Gould's book spotlights the Creole settlement of Isle Brevelle, which dates back to the area's colonial period. Gould celebrates the music, food, folklore, architecture, and landscape of this vibrant multiethnic community. Harlan Mark Guidry, one of the many descendants of Isle Brevelle now living throughout the United States, narrates the story of this unique cultural treasure.
- Recipes from the Isle (1999): Recipes from the Isle - Isle Brevelle, Louisiana Cookbook is a Creole cookbook featuring recipes from members of the St. Augustine Catholic Church on Isle Brevelle and residents living along Bayou Brevelle.

== Representation in film ==
- Cane River: The Isle Brevelle Church and Bayou Brevelle are depicted in the 1982 historical romantic drama Cane River, which was lost for decades before being rediscovered and distributed digitally and in theaters beginning in 2020.
- Steel Magnolias: Several scenes from the 1989 American comedy-drama film Steel Magnolias directed by Herbert Ross and starring Academy Award winners Sally Field, Shirley MacLaine, and Olympia Dukakis with Dolly Parton, Daryl Hannah, and Julia Roberts were shot on Isle Brevelle. Character Shelby's wedding was filmed at St. Augustine Church. The film is an adaptation of Robert Harling's 1987 play of the same name about the bond a group of women share in a small-town Southern community, and how they cope with the death of one of their own. The supporting cast features Tom Skerritt, Dylan McDermott, Sam Shepard and Kevin J. O'Connor.
- The Horse Soldiers: The Horse Soldiers is a 1959 American adventure war western film set during the American Civil War directed by John Ford and starring John Wayne, William Holden and Constance Towers. The screenplay by John Lee Mahin and Martin Rackin was loosely based on Harold Sinclair's 1956 novel of the same name, a fictionalized version of Grierson's Raid in Mississippi. Portions of the movie were filmed on Isle Brevelle including scenes of the plantation house along Bayou Brevelle.
- Clementine Hunter’s World: Clementine Hunter’s World is a 2016 documentary filmed on Isle Brevelle featuring life along the banks of the Cane River and Bayou Brevelle and colorful paintings of self-taught, primitive artist Clementine Hunter.

== See also ==
- Brevelle Lake
- Isle Brevelle
