= Nepomuceno de la Cerda =

Nepomuceno de la Cerda (1752–1826) was a Spanish soldier of note, after whom the town of La Cerda, Texas (near present day Woden) was named.

== Early life ==
Juan Nepomuceno de la Cerda was born in 1752 at Los Adaes, which is in modern-day Natchitoches Parish, Louisiana Nepomuceno was the son of a Spanish soldier and a mother was a [[Caddo]] Indian in [[Natchitoches Parish, Louisiana]].

== Life as a soldier ==
Nepomuceno de la Cerda and his brother, Francisco, both traveled as soldiers in the Spanish army. The de la Cerda brothers were scouts and bodyguards that protected Catholic priests who were exploring the Indian tribes of Louisiana and Texas. It was during this time that Spaniards in Louisiana were ordered by the King of Spain to remove to San Antonio, Texas. Many of the Spaniards died along the way from illnesses.

Nepomuceno and his brother were among the 76 Spaniards to sign a petition to the King of Spain in the fall of 1773 to move back to east to Louisiana. They were allowed to move as far east as Nacogdoches, Texas. Both of the de la Cerda brothers were granted leagues of land for their services.

== Later life ==
Nepomuceno de la Cerda married and fathered eight children, seven daughters and one son. Starting from the oldest they were: María Josefa de la Cerda, María Sapopa de la Cerda, María Telesfora de la Cerda, Ana María de la Cerda, María Marcelina de la Cerda, María Manuela de la Cerda, José Atanacio de la Cerda, and María Gertudes de la Cerda.

He lived his life as a rancher and was described as a "devout Catholic". Nepomuceno was described as a very refined man, well educated, and had beautiful handwriting. He died in 1826 and was buried at the Old Spanish Cemetery which is now underneath the old courthouse in Nacogdoches, Texas.

The town of La Cerda, Texas, and a railroad crossing were named in his honor, he being the original grantee of the surrounding land.
