= Diocese of Natchitoches =

Former residential and current titular see of the Catholic Church

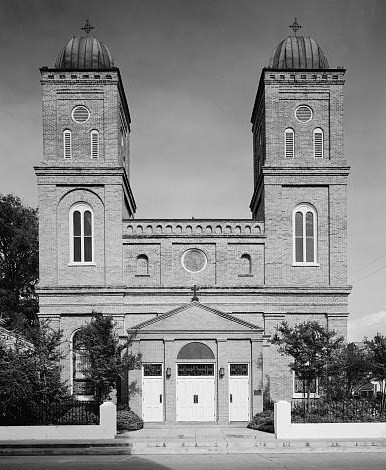
The Basilica of the Immaculate Conception in Natchitoches served as the diocesan cathedral.

The Diocese of Natchitoches (Latin: Dioecesis Natchitochensis) was a Latin Church residential episcopal see of the Catholic Church from 1853 to 1910 and is now a titular see.

== History ==
Originally, the bishopric of Natchitoches was the Catholic Diocese for the central portions of Louisiana—all the northern part of Louisiana above 31° N. lat., with an area of 22,212 square miles—when it was established on July 29, 1853. The diocese was headquartered in Natchitoches, Louisiana. The see city was later relocated to Alexandria, Louisiana and the diocese was renamed the Diocese of Alexandria. Since that time the Diocese of Natchitoches has been maintained as a titular see.

Antonio Margil was the first priest to minister within the territory now forming the diocese. From the Ays Indians, west of the Sabine river, Father Margil heard of the Adayes Indians, and in March, 1717, he located them near Spanish Lake, in what became Sabine Parish, Louisiana, founded the mission of San Miguel de Linares and built there probably the first church in Louisiana, for according to the historian Martin, when Pere Charlevoix reached New Orleans in 1721, he found there "about 100 cabins, two or three dwelling houses and a miserable storehouse which had been at first occupied as a chapel, a shed being now used for that purpose". Leaving Father Gusman in charge, Father Margil journeyed on foot to Natchitoches to minister to the French Catholics there, and then went back to Texas.

In 1718, during the brief war with Spain, Blondel, the French Commandant at Natchitoches, invaded the Adayes mission, plundered it and carried away the church vestments. Father Margil heard of it, and in 1721 came back, hunted up the Adayes who had taken refuge in the forests for fear of the French, rebuilt their church, which he dedicated to Our Lady of the Pillar, the patroness of the expedition. For many years afterward the Adayes mission was attended from San Antonio by the Franciscans, who attended also the missions of Nacogdoches and St. Augustin, Texas. In 1725 there were 50 Catholic families at Natchitoches. In 1728 Father Maximin, a Capuchin, was in charge.

There is no record to show how the eastern portion of the diocese was evangelized; but the Catholic names given to villages and lakes contiguous to the Mississippi, show that priests must have visited that country, probably the Jesuits, who in the 18th century had charge of the Indians along the Mississippi under the Bishop of Quebec. The records show that in 1829 Father Martin of Avoyelles attended the Catholics on the Red, Black and Ouachita rivers; that, in 1840 and after, Father J. Timon, afterwards Bishop of Buffalo, made regular trips from Texas to attend the north Louisiana missions, and that Father O'Brien, a Dominican from Louisville, attended yearly the Catholics along the Mississippi. The Catholics located on the rivers of the state often drifted to New Orleans on barges to have their marriages blessed and their children baptized, and come back cordelling their boats.

In 1852 the Fathers of the First Council of Baltimore recommended to the Holy See the division of the Archdiocese of New Orleans, the formation of the Diocese of Natchitoches and the appointment of Father Martin, parish priest at Natchitoches, as its first bishop. Consecrated in 1853, he had four priests in the new diocese, three of whom returned to New Orleans, to which diocese they belonged, and one remained.

Bishop Augustus Marie Martin (1802–1875), born in Brittany, inherited the deep faith of the Bretons. A protégé of Abbe Jean-Marie de Lamennais, as a seminarian, he was employed at the great Almonry of France in Paris under Cardinal Prince de Troy and Vicar-General J.-M. de Lamennais. There he came in contact with Montalembert and other disciples of Felicite Lamennais and acquired the polished manners that never left him. In 1839, while chaplain of the royal college in Rennes, he met Bishop Célestine Guynemer de la Hailandière of Vincennes, came to Indiana with him, and for six years was his vicar-general. His health failing, he came to Louisiana, and in 1852 was vicar-general of Mgr. Blanc of New Orleans. Bishop Martin left a collection of unpublished letters that tell the history of his diocese, his struggles with poverty, his many trips to France to recruit his clergy. A fluent writer, his letters to the Propagation of the Faith were inserted in the "Annals"; the bishops of the Second Council of Baltimore and those of the provincial Council of New Orleans delegated him to write letters of thanks to the directors of the Propagation of the Faith for their generous contributions. Both letters were reproduced in "Les Missions Catholiques". Bishop Martin left an organized diocese with 20 priests, the Sisters of the Sacred Heart with one convent at Natchitoches, and the Daughters of the Cross with their mother-house and several convents in the diocese.

He was succeeded by Bishop F. X. Leray, also a Breton, the hero of several yellow fever epidemics, and the founder of the Sisters of Mercy in the Diocese of Natchez. He remained in Natchitoches only two years, being selected as coadjutor to the Archbishop of New Orleans. He died in 1887.

Bishop Anthony Durier succeeded him. Born near Lyon in southern France, he came to this country in 1855, was pastor in New Orleans for 26 years and one of the theologians of the Second Council of Baltimore. Consecrated in 1885, he died in 1904, having finished the cathedral and built an episcopal residence at Natchitoches.

Right Rev. Cornelius Van De Ven, born at Oirschot, Holland, 16 June 1865, who studied in the diocesan seminary of Den Bosch, was ordained 31 May 1890, and came to America the same year. After filling important posts in the Archdiocese of New Orleans, he was consecrated Bishop of Natchitoches 30 November 1904. The most important act of his administration has been the transferring of the see from the inaccessible town of Natchitoches to the progressive city of Alexandria, a railroad centre with a large Catholic population. He went to Rome in 1910 and requested Pius X for the removal of the see. In August 1910, he received from the Consistorial Congregation the decree suppressing the See of Natchitoches and creating the See of Alexandria.

On 6 August 1910, Pope Pius X transferred the see and changed the title of the diocese to Diocese of Alexandria. At that time, a total of 26 diocesan priests, 10 regulars (Jesuits and Marists), the Brothers of the Sacred Heart, the Daughters of the Cross with mother-house at Shreveport, the Sisters of Divine Providence and the Sisters of the Incarnate Word served about 23,341 parishioners.

== Titular Bishops ==
- Anthony Mancini – Appointed February 18, 1999, he was named the Titular Bishop of Natchitoches upon his assignment as the Auxiliary Bishop of Montreal, Quebec. He was formally ordained on March 25, 1999.
- Joseph Marino – Appointed January 12, 2008, he was named the Titular Archbishop of Natchitoches upon his assignment as the Apostolic Nuncio to Bangladesh. His Episcopal Ordination was on March 29, 2008.

== See also ==
- Natchitoches Parish, Louisiana
- Isle Brevelle
- St. Augustine Parish (Isle Brevelle) Church, historic parish church of Isle Brevelle and sponsor of 5 missions (St. Anne at Old River, St. Anne at Spanish Lake, St. Charles, and St. Joseph) in the Natchitoches Diocese (now Alexandria Diocese).
- St. Anne Chapel at Old River, historic mission church (now chapel) of St. Augustine Parish Church.
- St. Anne Church (Spanish Lake), historic mission church of St. Augustine Parish Church.
