= Los Adaes =

Coordinates: 31°42′31″N 93°17′36″W

- U.S. National Register of Historic Places
- U.S. National Historic Landmark
- Location within Louisiana Location within the United States
- Location: Natchitoches Parish, Louisiana, USA
- Nearest city: Robeline, Louisiana
- Built: 1721
- NRHP reference No.: 78001427 (original); 93001622 (increase)

Significant dates
- Added to NRHP: June 7, 1978
- Boundary increase: November 4, 1993
- Designated NHL: June 23, 1986

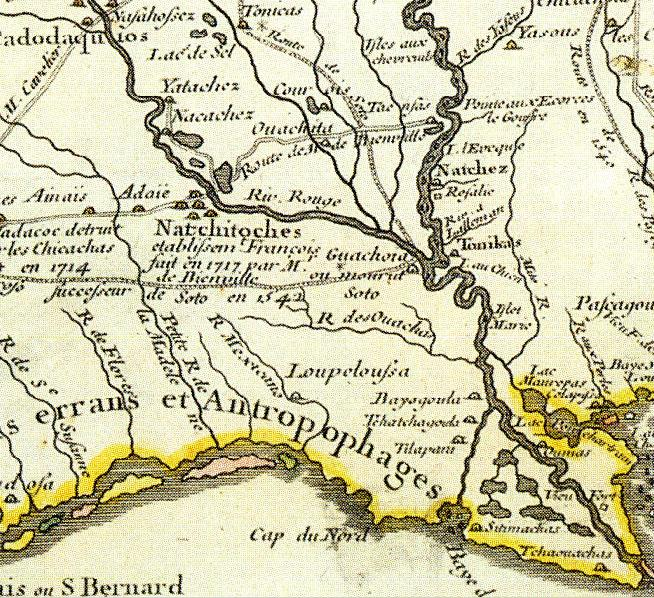
The first map to depict an Adais (Adaie) settlement, shown to the west of a cluster of Natchitoches villages. Drawn in 1718 by Guillaume Delisle

Los Adaes, was the capital of Tejas (Texas) on the northeastern frontier of New Spain from 1721 to 1773. It included a Franciscan mission, San Miguel de Cuéllar de los Adaes, and a presidio, Nuestra Señora del Pilar de los Adaes (Our Lady of the Pillar of the Adaes). The name Adaes derives from the Indigenous Adai people, members of the Caddoan confederacy of Indians who were the people the missionaries aimed to convert to Christianity. The presidio and mission were established to counter French influence in Louisiana territory and defend New Spain (Mexico, including Texas) from possible invasion or encroachment by the French. In 1763 Louisiana came under the control of Spain and the Los Adaes outpost was no longer necessary for defense. In 1773 the Spanish closed the mission and presidio and forced the population to move to San Antonio.

The site, now preserved in the state-run Los Adaes State Historic Site, is located on Louisiana Highway 485 in present-day Natchitoches Parish, Louisiana near the village of Robeline. It was designated a National Historic Landmark in 1986.

== History ==
Although Spain claimed much of the Gulf Coast of North America as part of its colonial territory, it largely ignored the region to the east of the Rio Grande throughout the 17th century. In 1699, French forts were established at Biloxi Bay and on the Mississippi River, ending Spain's exclusive control of the Gulf Coast. The Spanish recognized that French encroachment could threaten other Spanish areas, and they ordered the reoccupation of Texas as a buffer between New Spain and French settlements in Louisiana.

On April 12, 1716, an expedition led by Domingo Ramon left San Juan Bautista for Texas, intending to establish four missions and a presidio. At the same time, the French were building a fort in Natchitoches, having founded the town in 1714. The Spanish countered by founding two more missions just west of Natchitoches, including San Miguel de los Adaes (for a total of six missions in the region). The latter two missions were located in a disputed area; France claimed the Sabine River to be the western boundary of colonial Louisiana, while Spain claimed the Red River to be the eastern boundary of colonial Texas, leaving an overlap of 45 miles (72 km).

In 1719, European powers embarked on the War of the Quadruple Alliance. In June 1719, seven Frenchmen from Natchitoches took control of the mission of San Miguel de los Adaes from its sole defender, who did not know that the nations were at war. The French soldiers explained that 100 additional soldiers were coming; the Spanish colonists, missionaries, and remaining soldiers abandoned the area and fled to San Antonio.

The Marquis de San Miguel de Aguayo volunteered to reconquer Spanish Texas and raised an army of 500 soldiers. By July 1721, Aguayo reached the Neches River. His expedition encountered a French force en route to attack San Antonio de Bexar. The outnumbered Frenchmen agreed to retreat to Louisiana. Aguayo then ordered the building of a new presidio Nuestra Señora del Pilar de Los Adaes, located near present-day Robeline, Louisiana, only 12 miles (19 km) from Natchitoches. The new fort became the first capital of Texas, and it was guarded by 6 cannon and a garrison of 100 soldiers. All six of the eastern Tejas missions were reopened, under the protection of the new presidio.

Spain discouraged manufacturing in its colonies and limited trade to Spanish goods handled by Spanish merchants and carried on Spanish vessels. Most of the ports, including all of those in Texas, were closed to commercial vessels in the hopes of dissuading smugglers. By law, all goods bound for Texas had to be shipped to Vera Cruz and then transported over the mountains to Mexico City before being sent to Texas. This caused the goods to be very expensive in the Texas settlements. Because of the great distance between Los Adaes and the rest of the populated portions of Texas, the settlers in the area turned most often to the French colonists in neighboring Natchitoches, Louisiana, for trade. Without many goods to trade, however, the Spanish missionaries and colonists had little to offer the Indians, who remained loyal to the French traders.

Although the Spanish settlers in the area did not encounter hostile Native Americans, since the local Caddoan-speaking peoples were friendly, the Franciscan missionaries were unsuccessful in converting the local people to Catholicism. After many years of frustration in this regard, the College of Nuestra Señora de Guadalupe de Zacatecas, which was the sponsor of the missionaries at Los Adaes, recalled their missionaries in 1768, and the mission was closed.

On November 3, 1762, as part of the Treaty of Fontainebleau, France ceded the portion of Louisiana west of the Mississippi River to Spain. With France no longer a threat to Spain's North American interests, the Spanish monarchy commissioned the Marqués de Rubí to inspect all of the presidios on the northern frontier of New Spain and make recommendations for the future. Rubí was not impressed with Los Adaes. Two Franciscan missionaries lived there but 46 years of missionary endeavor had done "little more...than baptize a few of the dying." Not a single Indian lived at the Mission. Twenty-five Spanish families lived nearby on "little ranches." Crops were poor due a lack of irrigation and there was scarcely enough water to drink. Sixty-one Spanish soldiers were stationed at the presidio of Las Adaes. Rubi recommended that eastern Texas be abandoned, with all the population moved to San Antonio. With Louisiana in Spanish control, there was no need for a mission and presidio at Los Adaes to counter French competition. In August 1768, the acting governor, Juan María Vicencio, Baron de Ripperdá, moved his headquarters and the garrison to San Antonio, which became the new capital of Tejas in 1772.

The settlers who had lived near Los Adaes were forced to resettle in San Antonio in 1773. In the six years between the inspection and the removal of the settlers, the population of eastern Tejas had increased from 200 settlers of European descent to 500 people, a mixture of Spanish, French, Indians, and a few blacks. The settlers were given only five days to prepare for the move to San Antonio. Many of them perished during the three-month trek and others died soon after arriving.

After vociferously protesting, the former residents of eastern Tejas were allowed to leave San Antonio the following year (1774); but they were not allowed to locate beyond the Trinity River, 175 miles (282 km) from Natchitoches. In 1779, the Comanches began raiding the new settlement. The former Los Adaes settlers chose to move farther east to the old mission of Nacogdoches, where they founded the town of the same name. The new town quickly became a waystation for contraband.

The site of Los Adaes was declared a National Historic Landmark in 1986. It is a site on the El Camino Real de los Tejas National Historic Trail.

== Present day ==
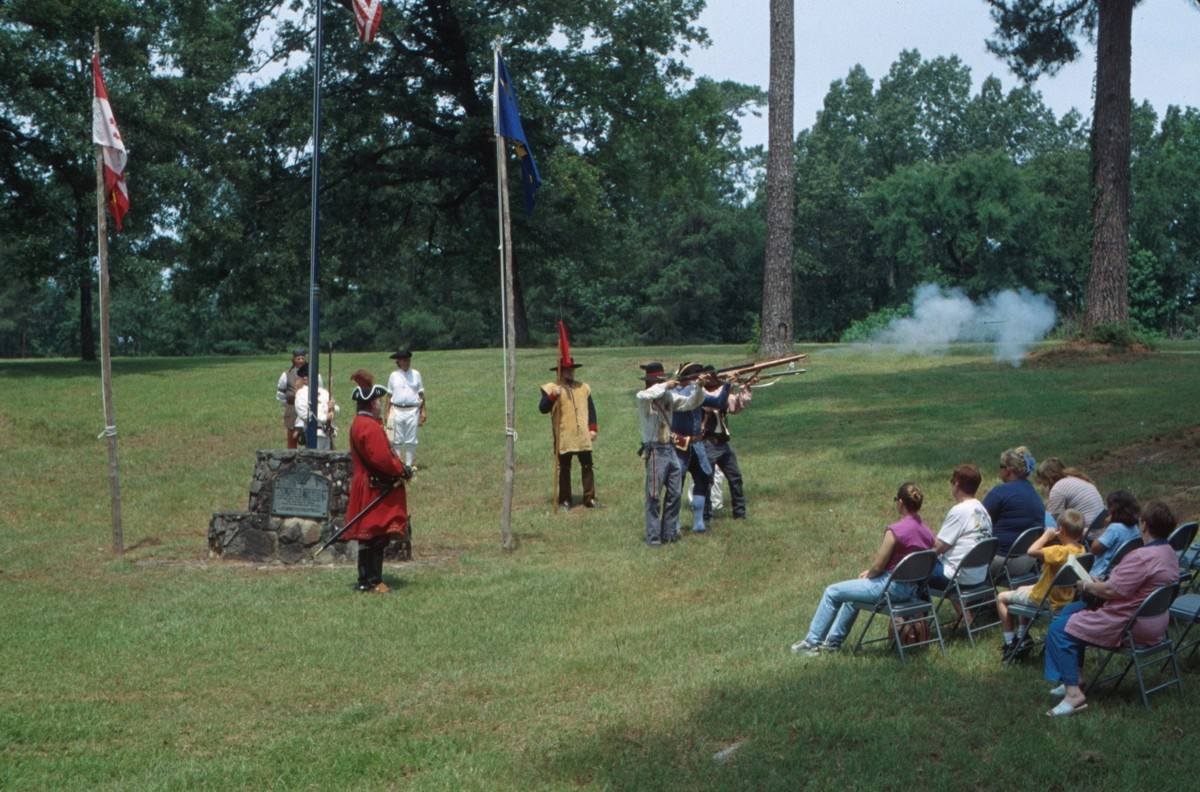
Reenactors performing a gun salute at the present-day historic site

Today the site of Los Adaes is near the town of Robeline, Louisiana. The Los Adaes site has proven to be one of the most important archaeological sites in the US for the study of colonial Spanish and Adai culture presented by the Adai Caddo Indians of Louisiana.

Dr. Hiram F. "Pete" Gregory Jr., an archaeologist at nearby Northwestern State University, conducted landmark excavations at the historic presidio from the 1960s through the 1980s. In the 1990s, the state appointed Dr. George Avery to the newly created position of station archaeologist of the Los Adaes State Commemorative Area (as it was called at the time). In this capacity, Avery contributed a great deal in his own right. Los Adaes has since lost its station archaeologist position. However, Avery, Gregory, and other archaeologists specializing in the Spanish colonial borderlands continue to advance the knowledge of this frontier outpost. Gregory, in particular, has championed the need for more academic interest in Los Adaes and the colonial history of northern and central Louisiana in general.

== Notable people ==
- Nepomuceno de la Cerda (1752–1826), Spanish soldier born in Los Adaes

== See also ==
- Adai Caddo Indians of Louisiana
- Adai people
- Adai language
- List of National Historic Landmarks in Louisiana
- Louisiana (New France)
- Louisiana (New Spain)
- Sabine River Spanish – Spanish variety spoken in Texas and Louisiana
- Spanish missions in Louisiana
- Spanish missions in Texas
- Spanish Texas
- Isle Brevelle
- National Register of Historic Places listings in Natchitoches Parish, Louisiana
- Anne des Cadeaux
- Louis Juchereau de St. Denis
- Natchitoches Parish
