= Jean Baptiste Brevelle =

French explorer and soldier of the Louisiana colony

- Born: 1698; Paris, Île-de-France, France
- Died: 1754; Isle Brevelle, Natchitoches Parish, Louisiana, French Louisiana
- Other names: Jean Baptiste Brevel, Jean Baptiste Breville
- Occupations: Explorer; Trader; Soldier
- Years active: 1718-1754
- Known for: Early settler and soldier of the first European settlements in Louisiana and NE Texas (Fort St. Jean Baptiste des Natchitoches and Le Poste des Cadodaquious)
- Spouse: Anne des Cadeaux (m. 1736; died 1754)
- Children: 2: Jean Baptiste Brevelle II and Marie Louise Francoise Jean Brevelle

Jean Baptiste Brevelle (French: Jean Baptiste Brevel) was a French-born American trader, explorer, and one of the first soldiers garrisoned at Fort St. Jean Baptiste des Natchitoches in present-day Natchitoches, Louisiana and Le Poste des Cadodaquious in Texas.

== Explorer of French Louisiana ==
Brevelle arrived in French Louisiana during the construction of Fort St. Jean Baptiste des Natchitoches in 1719. Commandant Claude Charles du Tisné had arrived to the outpost just a few years earlier to convert the 2 huts built in 1714 by Louis Juchereau de St. Denis, into a fortified post on Red River of the South to establish France's claims to the region, and to prevent the Spanish forces in the province of Texas from advancing across the border.

Brevelle's military and trade assignments took them to various Native American, Spanish and French settlements throughout present-day Louisiana, Arkansas, Texas, and Oklahoma including Le Poste des Cadodaquious (also known as Le Posts des Nassonites) in Bowie and Red River County, Texas. This post was founded by Jean-Baptiste Bénard de la Harpe, and it is the first European settlement in northeast Texas. The post was garrisoned by a detachment from Fort St. Jean Baptiste des Natchitoches. Brevelle traveled and mapped the areas along the Red, Sabine, and Trinity Rivers where he lived among and traded with the Natchitoches, Adai, Hasinai, Nasoni, Yatasi, Tawakoni and Kadohadacho Indians.

== Family life ==
Brevelle took a young Caddo woman from the Village of the Adays near the El Camino Real (English: The King’s Highway). She was given the Christian name of Marie Anne des Cadeaux, named for Saint Anne, the mother of the Virgin Mother and grandmother of Jesus. Brevelle so loved Anne that he obtained permission from Fort Commandant Louis Juchereau de St. Denis to marry her and free her from slavery. After the publication of three banns, they were married in 1736 in the Catholic Church in Natchitoches. Anne bore two children, who would become the first Creoles of Isle Brevelle.

== Legacy ==
Brevelle died in 1754 on Isle Brevelle near Bayou Brevelle. Fort St. Jean Baptiste des Natchitoches became the town of Natchitoches, the oldest permanent settlement in the Louisiana Purchase territory.

Brevelle's son, Jean Baptiste Brevelle II, with his knowledge of various Caddo languages and customs, worked as the famed translator, arbitrator, explorer, and soldier for the French and Spanish crowns. For his service, he was issued a land grant of fertile farmland south of Natchitoches along the Cane River and Old River. The 30-mile long island is today known as Isle Brevelle. Dr. John Sibley, Indian Agent and council to Louisiana's first U.S. Governor, in 1804 reported to the U.S. Congress that the Isle Brevelle was named for its earliest settler, Jean Baptiste Brevelle II.

The former Brevelle Plantation (now Isle Brevelle) is home to the Cane River Creole National Historical Park and is the birthplace of Creole culture. In Louisiana, the term Creole is defined as native-born people of ethnic European background mixed with Native American and/or African. Brevelle's story and that of both of his Creole children are documented in the records of the Catholic Church and in interviews conducted by Indian Agent Dr. Sibley after the Louisiana Purchase which are on file in the American State Papers, Library of Congress, and the Annals of Congress.

St. Augustine Parish (Isle Brevelle) Church, Bayou Brevelle, and Isle Brevelle in Natchitoches Parish and Brevelle Lake in Red River County are named for this pioneer family.

"The Caddo left their names, art, and culture in Louisiana. Several colonial European families can claim Caddoan ancestors: Grappes, Brevelles, Balthazars, and others."

== See also ==
- Cane River (film)
- National Register of Historic Places listings in Natchitoches Parish, Louisiana
