= Adai Caddo Indians of Louisiana =

State-recognized tribe in Louisiana, US

- Adai Caddo Indian Nation of Louisiana
- Named after: Adai people, Caddo people
- Founder: Rufus Davis
- Founded at: Robeline, Louisiana
- Type: state-recognized tribe, 501(c)(3) organization
- Tax ID no.: Caddo Adais Indians, Inc.: EIN 76-0359749
- Legal status: Active, State-Recognized Native American Tribe
- Purpose: Community and economic development
- Headquarters: Adai Caddo Indian Nation Cultural Center, 4460 LA-485, Robeline, LA, United States
- Members: 3,000+ (2015)
- Chief: John Mark Davis
- Board of directors: Debbie Garrett, Dee Niette Thompson, Charlene Conarroe, Boyd Ocon, Robert Brevelle
- Staff: 9
- Website: adaicaddo.com

The Adai Caddo Indians of Louisiana (also known as Adai Caddo Indian Nation of Louisiana and the Adai Caddo Tribe) is a state-recognized tribe in Louisiana and 501(c)(3) organization in Robeline, Louisiana. Its members identify as descendants of the Adai people. The chief is John Mark Davis, as of 2023.

Today, members of the state-recognized tribe are predominantly based in Louisiana and surrounding states.

== History and scholarship ==
=== 21st century ===
In 2000, a tribe hosted planned powwow was reported, with a highlight of the powwow being the Adai Caddo tribe and Caddo Tribe of Oklahoma dancing together in traditional dances with an estimated 200 people set to participate.

In 2000 Adai Caddo tribe received a grant from the Louisiana Endowment for the Humanities as aid for cultural demonstrations, dances, and songs.

In 2003, Chief Davis Rufus represented the Native American Culture of Louisiana during a Louisiana purchase Bicentennial celebration.

== Culture ==
=== Religion ===
The tribe is recognized by the Tekakwitha Conference of the Roman Catholic Church. The Tekakwitha Conference is an international Catholic religious 501(c)(3) organization, dedicated to the ongoing advocacy and evangelization on behalf of the many Indigenous Catholics across North America. The past 2 Chiefs of the Adai tribe have been members of the St. Kateri Circle of the Alexandria Diocese, and the tribe hosts Native American Prayer and Eucharistic Ceremonies at the Adai Cultural Center.

The tribe is predominantly Catholic and has close ties to nearby St. Anne's Catholic Church. In 2024, the tribe, in collaboration with the Diocese of Alexandria, passed a resolution making Saint Anne the official patron saint of the tribe.

=== Activities ===
The tribe maintains a cultural center and museum in Robeline, Louisiana. The center is about five miles north of Los Adaes State Historic Site, an early 18th-century Spanish mission and ancestral village of the Adai Indians. The museum houses hundreds of artifacts from the tribe's history. Among its artifacts are several gourd rattles that were carved, painted or decorated with beads and used in both prehistoric and modern ceremonies, as well as prehistoric containers for carrying food, water and herbs. Prehistoric cooking utensils, baby rattles and toys, war breastplates and traditional cradle boards are also on display. Many of the artifacts were recovered in 1995 from the Los Adaes Station and in conjunction with Northwestern State University.

The tribe hosts an annual powwow each October at its 80-acre ceremonial grounds in Robeline. Nearly 3,000 visitors attend the powwow making it the largest festival in Robeline and the surrounding area.

Each spring, the tribe participates in the El Camino Real de los Tejas "SALE ON THE TRAIL." The tribe is located in Robeline near the El Camino Real and hosts seminars on the historic route connecting the Spanish and French colonies from Mexico to Louisiana.

Each Mother's Day, the tribe hosts a ceremony to honor their ancestors at St. Anne's Catholic Church and cemetery in Robeline. This tradition was taken from St. Augustine Parish (Isle Brevelle) Church, which hosts a similar ceremony on All Saints Day. Historically, St. Anne's Catholic Church was part of the St. Augustine Parish. On March 11, 1856, the mission of St. Augustine at Isle Brevelle was decreed by Bishop Auguste Martin to be a parish in its own right and assigned Fr. Francois Martin to be its first resident pastor. St. Augustine Church (also known as the Isle Brevelle Church) expanded to serve four other churches in the area, St. Charles Chapel at Bermuda, St. Joseph's Catholic Mission at Bayou Derbonne, St. Anne Chapel at Old River, and St. Anne Church (Spanish Lake) serving the Adai Caddo Indians.

== Recognition and awareness efforts ==
Caddo Adais Indians, Inc., organized as a nonprofit corporation in Robeline, Louisiana, in May 1991 and in Houston, Texas, in October 1993. Ann Davis of Houston, Texas, served as its principal officer. The Friends of Caddo Adais Indians, Inc., a nonprofit organization in Shreveport, Louisiana on October 1, 1992. E. Craig Kennedy served as the registered agent; however the nonprofit is inactive.

In 2016 reporting, the then new The Chief Davis Foundation of the American Indian was described as a way to spread awareness about the presence of American Indian people, Chief Davis envisioning it as a way to interview leaders from different tribes which could then be uploaded to YouTube and a website as a way to highlight contributions of American Indians.

=== State recognition ===
Governor Edwin Edwards created the Louisiana Office of Indian Affairs in 1972 through an executive order. In the 1990s, the office designated the Adai Caddo Indians of Louisiana as a state-recognized tribe of the Adai people. The state-recognized tribe is known by other names, including Caddo Adais Tribe and the Adai Caddo Indian Nation.

The Louisiana State Senate passed Senate Concurrent Resolution No. 16 in honor of the Caddo Adais Indians. Louisiana House Bill 660 established the Native American Commission in 2018 to promote Native American culture and identify needs facing that community. One member from each of the 15 recognized tribes serves on the commission. The tribe's Vice Chief Deb Garrett serves on the board as secretary of the Native American Commission.

The US Patent and Trademark Office issued the trademark Adai Caddo Indian Nation to the tribe.

=== Federal recognition efforts ===
The Adai Caddo Tribe sent a letter of intent to petition for federal recognition on September 13, 1993; however, they never submitted a completed petition for federal recognition.

In 2016 reporting by the Daily World, Adai Caddo Chief, Rufus Davis, is profiled within his struggles of trying to seek federal recognition. Daily World writes that the tribe had been stalled in the process of applying for federal acknowledgment for more than two years at that point, and that based off the tribe's initial application, the Department of the Interior's Office of Federal Acknowledgment which oversees the application process, requested that the tribe send additional proof after Davis had submitted a F.W. Hodge report and an Adai Caddo church chronology. Davis comments that the tribe was struggling with the ability to hire people to complete this process, commenting that the lack of expertise has caused the tribe to rely on hired expertise.

== Tribal statistical area ==
The US Census Bureau established a State Designated Tribal Statistical Area for the Adai Caddo SDTSA, which includes Natchitoches Parish.

== Notable people ==
- Chief Rufus Davis Jr. (1939–2022), former Chief of the Adai Caddo Indian Nation and founder of Chief Solutions Inc., a technical consulting firm in Houston, Texas. After a mass of Christian Burial at the Minor Basilica of the Immaculate Conception Catholic Church in Natchitoches, he was laid to rest at St. Anne's Cemetery, a historical Adai cemetery.
- Chief John Mark Davis
- Vice Chief Deb Garrett
- Secretary Boyd Ocon
- Treasurer Charlene Conarroe
- Historian Dee Niette Thompson
- Councilman At-Large Robert Brevelle, chairman of the Louisiana Genealogical and Historical Society, registered agent of the Adai Caddo Indian Nation, and entrepreneur and investor.

== Representation in film ==
- Texas Before The Alamo: Filmed at historic sites in Louisiana, Texas and Mexico with noted historians, professional actors and Adai Native Americans, Texas Before The Alamo is about the founding of modern Texas and the native Caddo and Adai tribes that dealt with the French and Spanish who were in the process of establishing Missions, Presidios and Trails now known as Goliad, the Alamo, San Antonio Missions & El Camino Real de los Tejas.

== Notable places ==
- Robeline, Louisiana
- Natchitoches, Louisiana
- Natchitoches Parish, Louisiana
- Los Adaes
- Fort St. Jean Baptiste State Historic Site
- Basilica of the Immaculate Conception (Natchitoches, Louisiana)
- St. Augustine Parish (Isle Brevelle) Church
- National Register of Historic Places listings in Natchitoches Parish, Louisiana

== See also ==
- Adai language
- Adai people
- Anne des Cadeaux
- Caddo
- Caddo language
- Caddoan Mississippian culture
- Great Raft
- John Sibley (doctor)
- Louis Juchereau de St. Denis
- Louisiana Purchase
