= Adai people =

Extinct Native American people from Louisiana and Texas

Adai
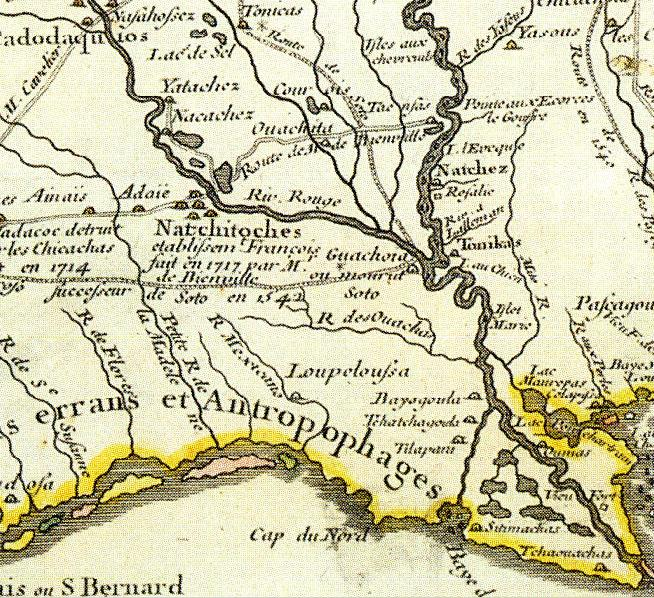
- Cropped detail map from a 1718 map by Guillaume Delisle. Adaie on left side.

Total population
- extinct as a tribe, merged into the Caddo

Regions with significant populations
- southwest Louisiana, northeast Texas

Languages
- Adai language

Religion
- Indigenous religion

Related ethnic groups
- possibly other tribes within the Caddo Confederacy

The Adai were a Native American people of northwestern Louisiana and northeastern Texas. They were an Indigenous people of the Southeastern Woodlands and part of the Caddo Confederacy.

== Name ==
The name Adai derives from the Caddo word hadai meaning 'brushwood'. French explorer Pierre Le Moyne d'Iberville called them the Natao.

Adai's name has also been written Adaizan, Adaizi, Adaise, Adahi, Adaes, Adees, Atayos, and Nadais.

== Language ==
The extinct Adai language was once thought to be Caddoan, but may be a language isolate and remains unclassified because of a lack of attestation. John Sibley wrote that the Adai language "differs from all others, and is so difficult to speak or understand that no nation can speak ten words of it." A list of approximately 250 words in Adai was recorded.

== History ==
=== 16th century ===
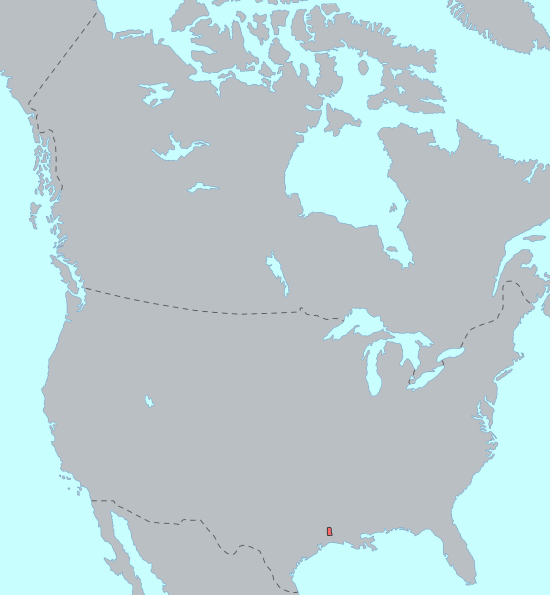
Historic homelands of the Adai people with modern national borders

The Adai were among the first peoples in North America to experience European contact and were profoundly affected. In 1530, Álvar Núñez Cabeza de Vaca wrote of them using the name Atayos.

=== 17th century ===
Some Adai joined the Mission of San Francisco de los Tejas, that the Spanish founded in 1690 in San Antonio, Texas. In 1699, Iberville encountered the Adai in Louisiana along the Red River.

=== 18th century ===
In 1716, Spanish colonists founded the Mission of San Miguel de Linares, also known as the Mission of Adayes, to convert the Adai, Natchitoches, and other Caddo people to Roman Catholicism. The French and their Native allies destroyed that mission in 1719 but the Spanish rebuilt in 1721. The Spanish later built the Presidio of Nuestra Señora del Pilar de Los Adaes, near Natchitoches, Louisiana.

French explorer Jean-Baptiste Bénard de la Harpe wrote in 1719 that the Adai were helpful to French traders. Then, they lived in villages along the Red River from Louisiana into Texas past the Sabine River. Conflicts between the French and Spanish, introduced diseases, and alcohol took a toll on the Adai, and they are almost gone by 1778.

Archaeologists have identified their pottery styles in the 1770s as being increasingly tempered with bone and named their ceramic types "Patton Engraved" and "Emory Incised".

Around 1792, 14 Adai families migrated to Presidio San Antonio de Béxar in San Antonio, Texas, where they assimilated into other tribes. Surviving Adai families near Nacogdoches, Texas, merged into the Caddos.

=== 19th century ===
American Indian agent John Sibley recorded a small Adai village that became known as the Lac Madon site, which was populated through 1820. He wrote that there were only "twenty men of them remaining, but more women," while Rev. Jedidiah Morse recorded only 30 surviving Adai by 1820.

Ethnographer Henry Rowe Schoolcraft recorded 27 Adai in 1825, and ethnographer John Reed Swanton wrote, "they are now entirely merged with the other Caddo. ... Although the tribal name is remembered, the tribe itself is now wholly merged with the peoples which go under the name of 'Caddo.'"

== State-recognized tribe ==
The State of Louisiana designated the Adai Caddo Indians of Louisiana based in Robeline, Louisiana, as a state-recognized tribe.
