= Cane River =

River in Louisiana, United States

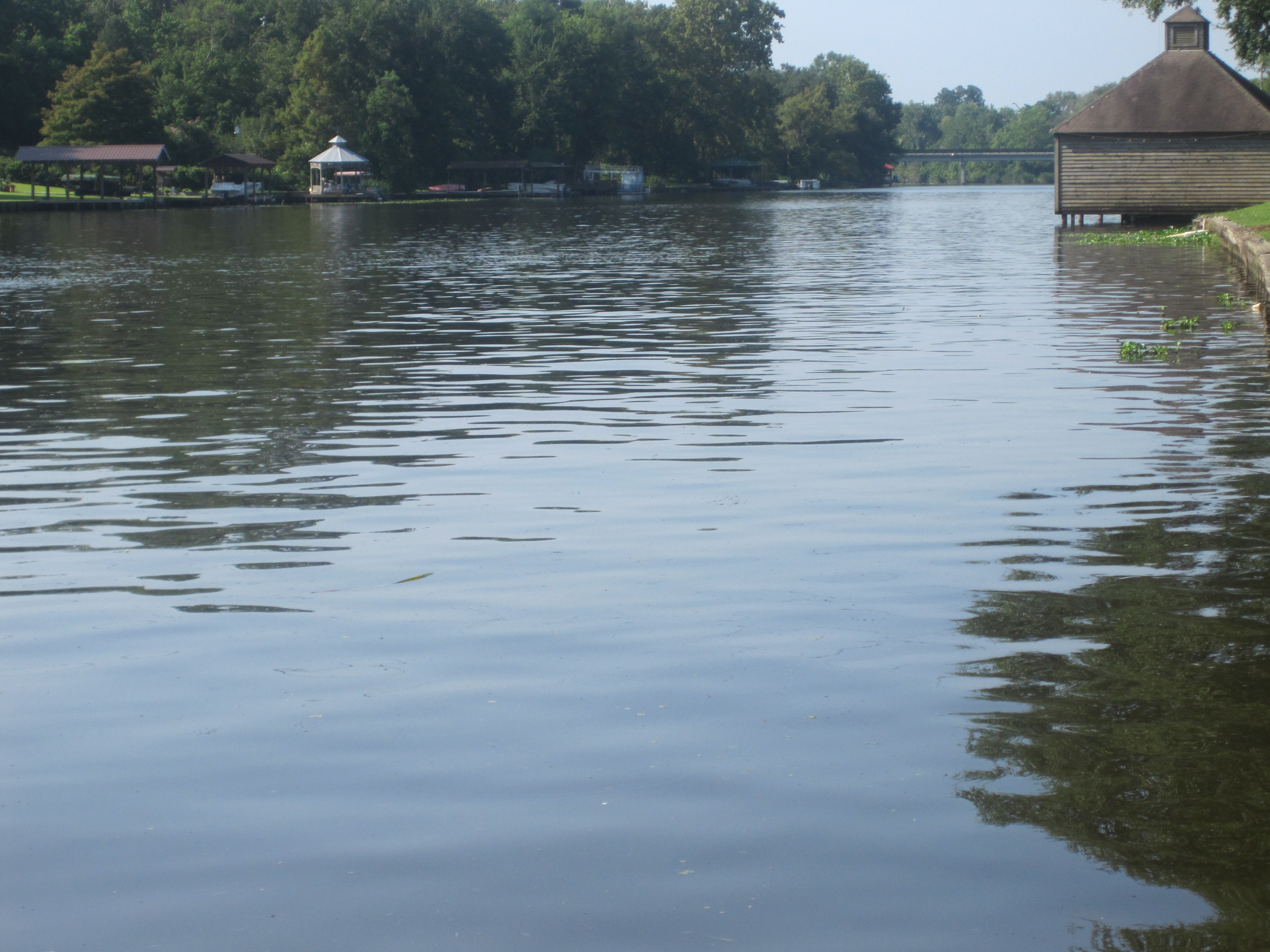
- Cane River

Location
- Country: United States
- State: Louisiana
- Parish: Natchitoches

Physical characteristics
- Source
  - coordinates: 31°33′55″N 92°58′06″W
- Mouth: Red River of the South
  - location: At the Natchitoches–Rapides Parish boundary
  - coordinates: 31°44′35″N 93°05′10″W
- Length: 30 miles (48 km)

The Cane River (French: Rivière aux Cannes) is a 30-mile-long (48 km) river in Natchitoches Parish, Louisiana, originating from a portion of the Red River. In the 19th and 20th centuries, it gained prominence as the locus of a Creole de couleur (multiracial) culture, centered around the Melrose Plantation and the adjacent St. Augustine Parish (Isle Brevelle) Church. Melrose Plantation is a National Historic Landmark.

In 1836, the Red River shifted into an eastern channel, known as the "Rigolette de Bon Dieu."

Lyle Saxon wrote a short story titled "Cane River" published in 1926. The Cane River and Creoles also feature in Saxon's 1937 novel Children of Strangers.

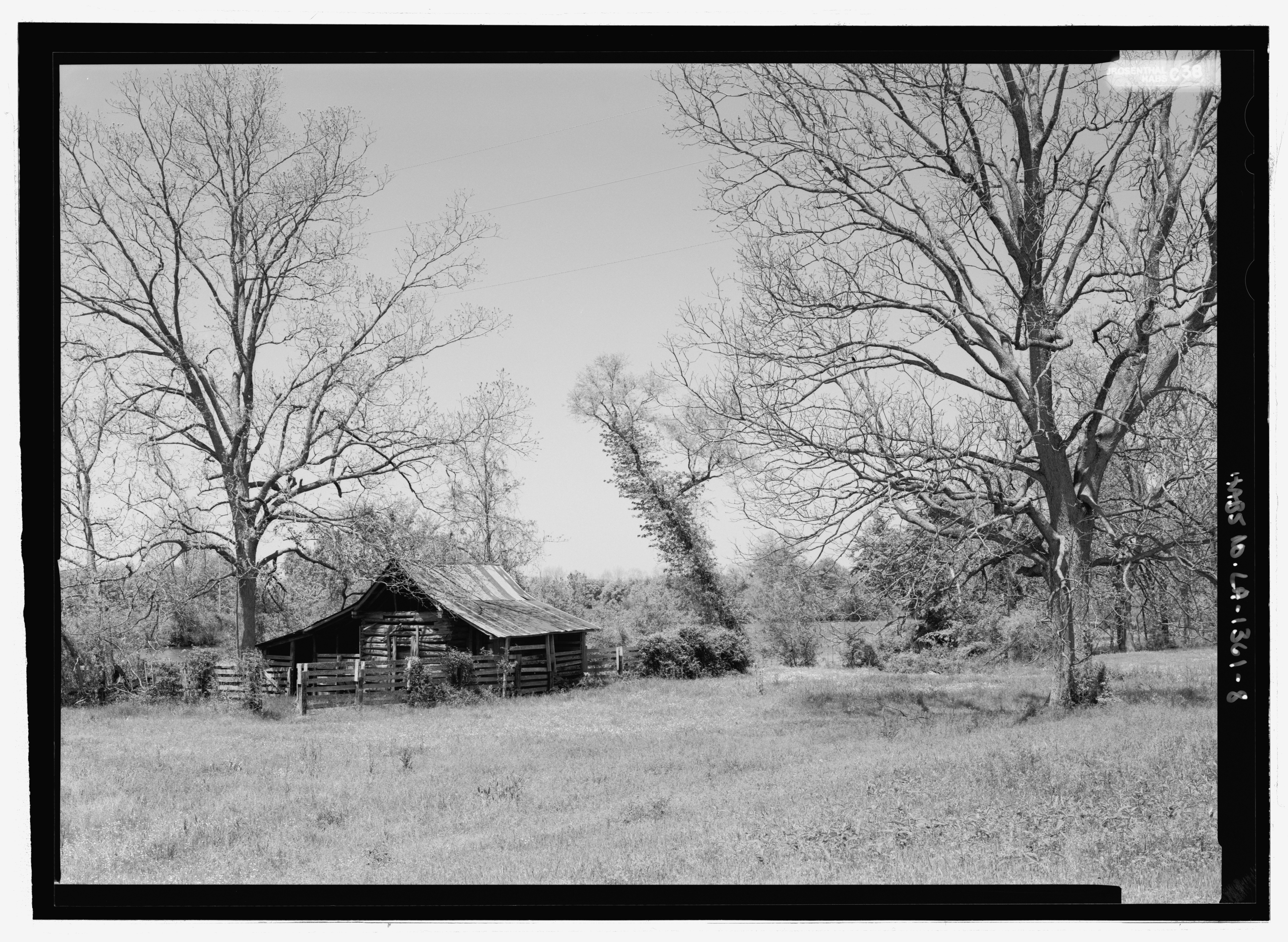
Cabin along the river ca. 1933

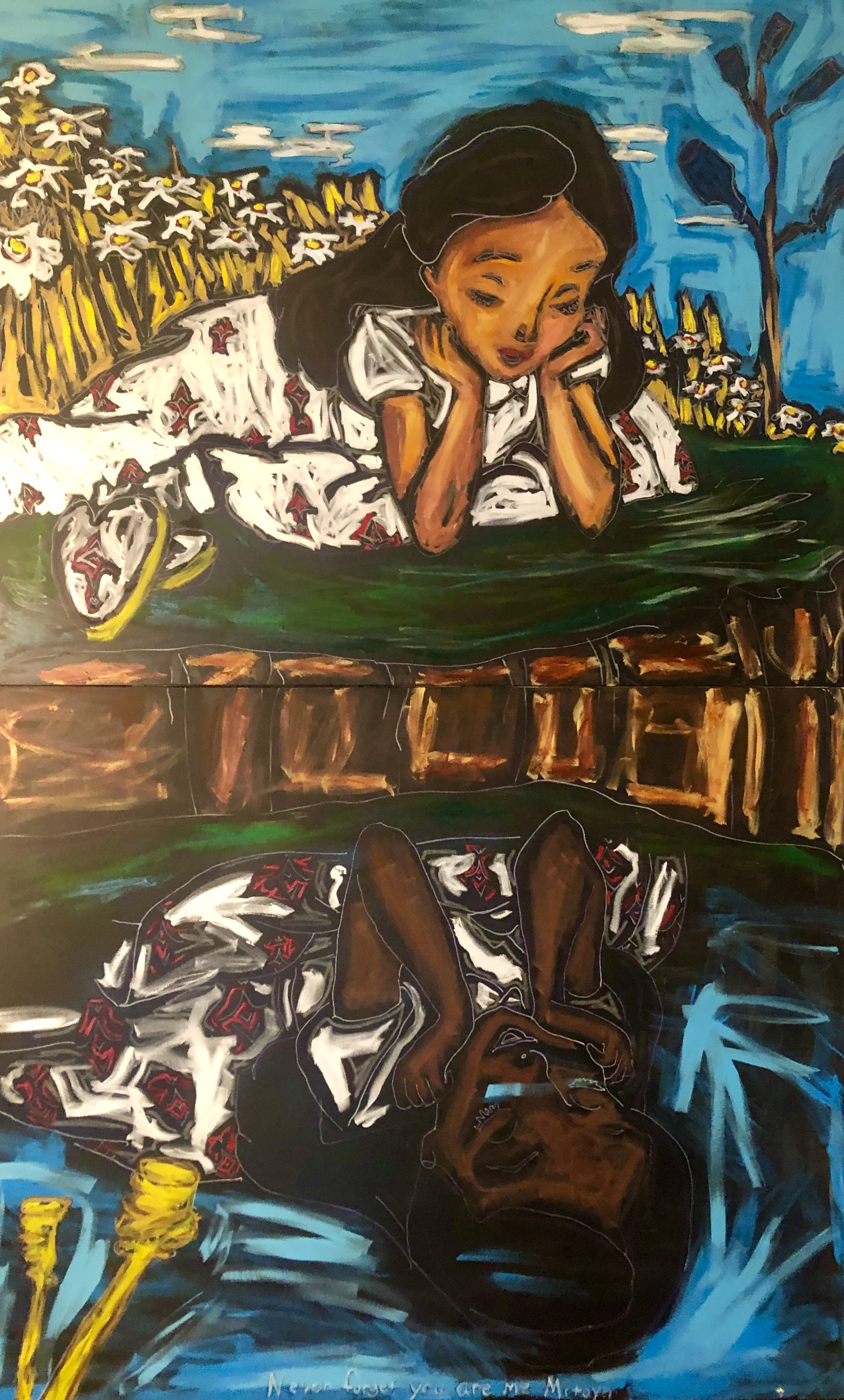
"Cane River" by John Isiah Walton

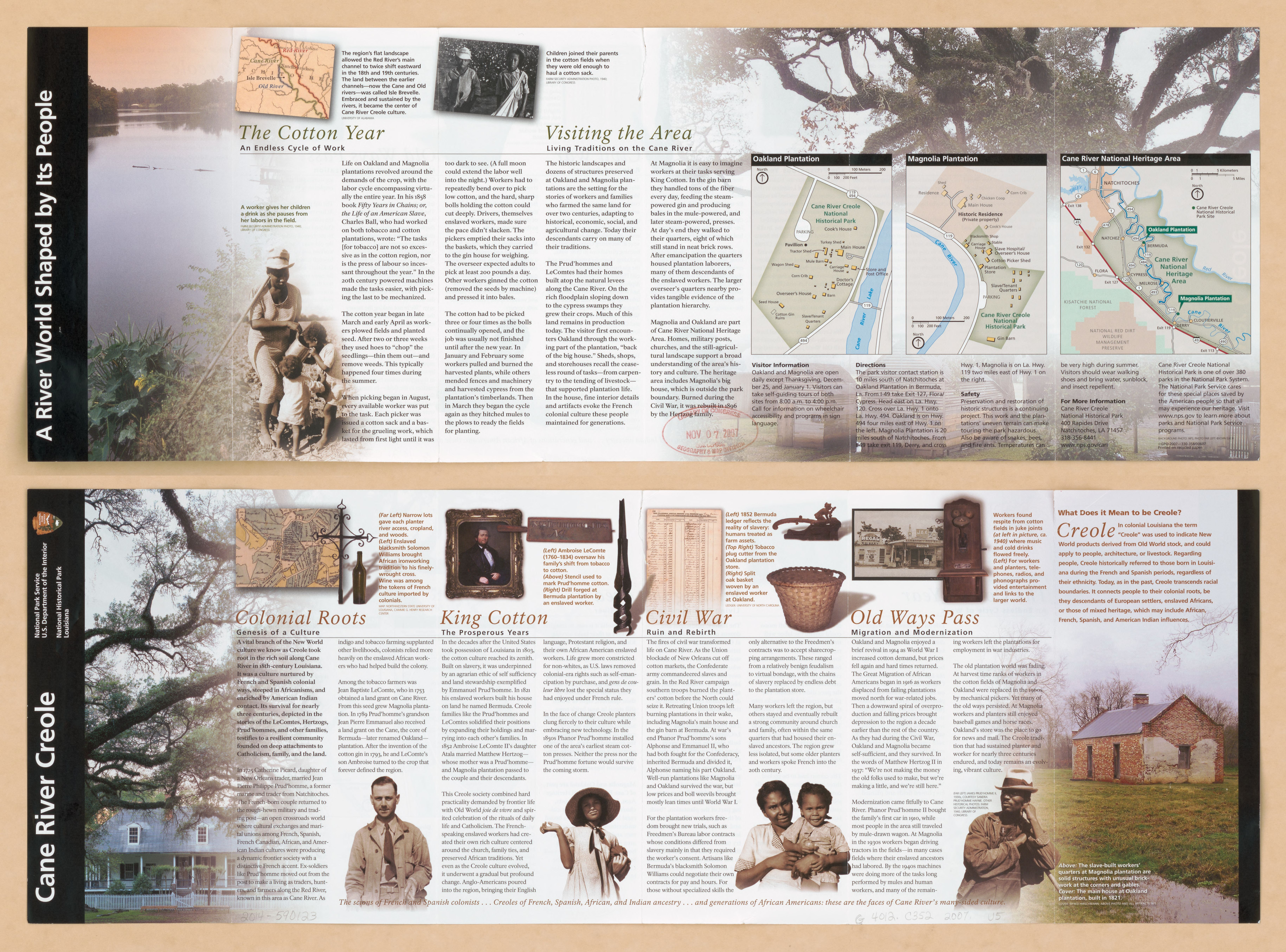
Display at the Cane River Creole National Historical Park

== See also ==
- Cane River Creole National Historical Park
- Isle Brevelle
- Red River of the South
- Anne des Cadeaux
- Sabine River Spanish
- Bayou Brevelle
- Adai Caddo Indians of Louisiana
- Louisiana Creole people
