= Fort St. Jean Baptiste State Historic Site =

American fort in Natchitoches, Louisiana

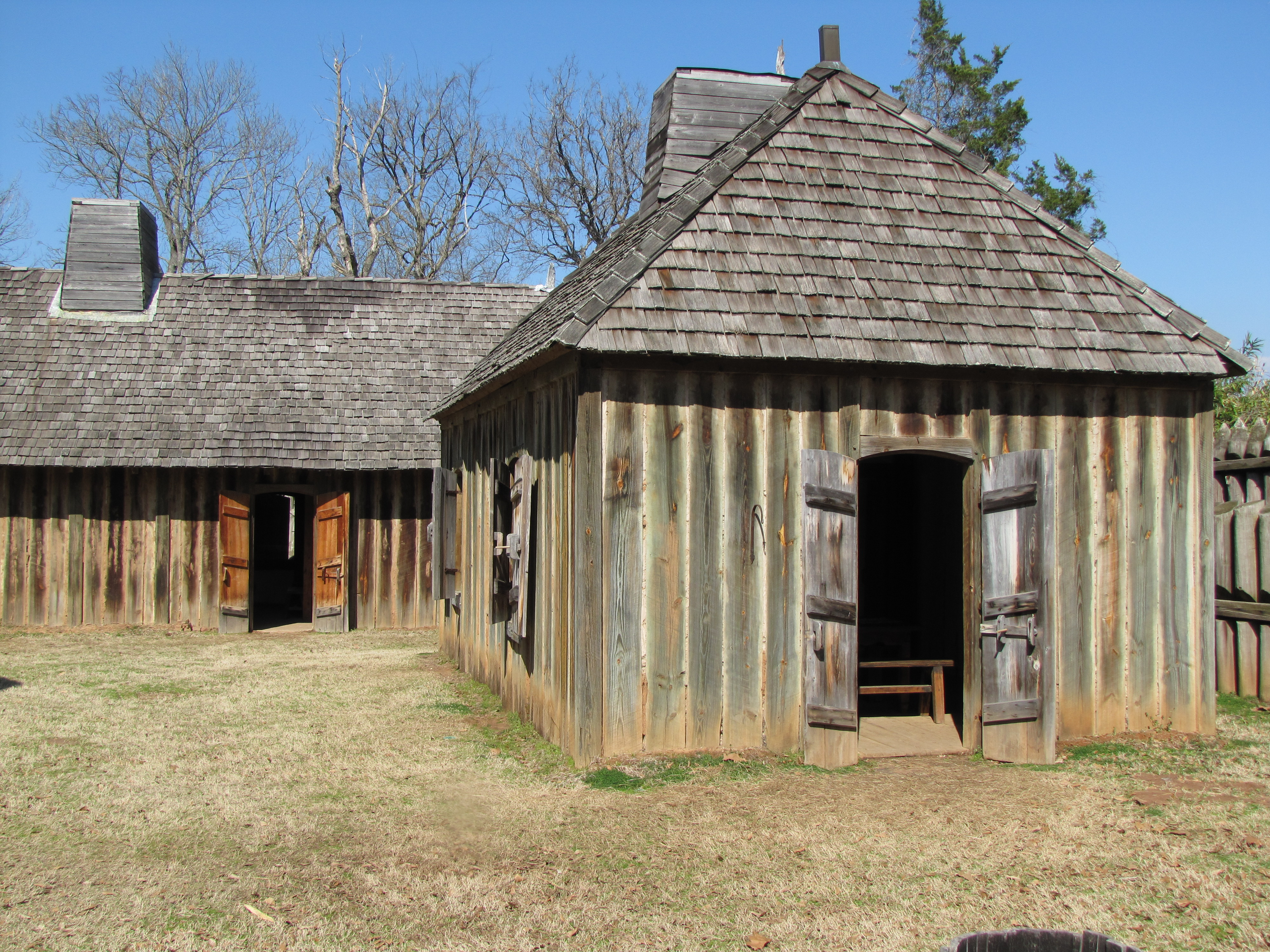
- Replica building at the fort St. Jean Baptiste des Natchitoches.

- Location within Louisiana
- Location: Natchitoches Parish, Louisiana, United States of America
- Coordinates: 31.752222°N 93.087778°W
- Area: 5 acres (2.0 ha)
- Governing body: Louisiana Office of State Parks
- Website: Official web page

Fort St. Jean Baptiste State Historic Site in Natchitoches, Louisiana, US, is a replica of an early French fort based upon the original 1716 blueprints by Sieur Du Tisné with the improvements made in 1731 by Boutin. The French called the original fort Fort Saint Jean Baptiste des Natchitoches. In the 1970s, the State of Louisiana shortened the name to Fort Saint Jean Baptiste.

== History ==
The fort (present-day city of Natchitoches) was founded by a French Canadian, Louis Juchereau de St. Denis in 1714 while he was traveling to Mexico on a trade mission. When St. Denis reached the village of the Natchitoches Indians on the Red River of the South, he had two huts constructed and left a small French detachment there to guard the stores and trade with the Native Americans. In 1716, Sieur Du Tisné was sent with a small company of French colonial troops to build and garrison the outpost that would prevent the Spanish forces in the province of Texas from advancing across the border of French Louisiana.

In 1722, St. Denis became commandant of the fort. The fort was established as a trading and military outpost to counter any Spanish incursions into French territory. Soon it became a center of economic significance, particularly with neighboring Caddo tribes. In 1731, an attack by the Natchez Indians exposed the vulnerabilities of the fort, prompting French officials to send engineer Broutin to oversee the construction of a larger and stronger fortification. Spanish officials charged it was an invasion of Spanish territory, but St. Denis politely ignored their protests.

The fort continued to serve as a military outpost and commercial trade center until 1762, when France’s defeat by England in the French and Indian War forced her to cede the Louisiana (New France) colony to Spain.

The fort turned into the city of Natchitoches. Natchitoches is the oldest permanent European settlement in the Louisiana Purchase.

== Other Notable Soldiers ==
In addition to Claude Charles Du Tisne and Louis Juchereau de St. Denis, there were other notable soldiers garrisoned at the fort in its early years as a frontier outpost 1714-1740. In 1719, when Blondel heard of the war in Europe between Spain and France, he and a small detail of 5 French soldiers left Fort St. Jean Baptiste des Natchitches and attacked the nearest Spanish fort: San Miguel de Linares de los Adaes Mission (Capital of Texas and Los Adaes) near the El Camino Real in present-day Robeline, Louisiana. The French captured the mission and took the sacred vestments and other provisions including the chickens in the henhouse. As Blondel mounted his horse after tying the chickens to the pommel of his saddle, the chickens flapped their wings, the horse reared, and the lieutenant was spilled in the dirt. The French victory was called the Chicken War. This caused the viceroy of Mexico to send the largest military force in history into Louisiana.

Jean Baptiste Brevelle (French: Jean Baptiste Brevel) a Parisian-born trader, explorer, and one of the first soldiers garrisoned at Fort St. Jean Baptiste des Natchitoches. Brevelle was an early explorer of present-day Louisiana, Arkansas and Texas and also served at Le Poste des Cadodaquious. After returning from several years exploring the hinterlands and living in Native American villages, Brevelle married Native American slave Anne des Cadeaux after he obtained permission from Fort Commandant St. Denis. After the publication of three banns, Brevelle and Anne were married in 1736 in the Catholic Church in Natchitoches. Anne bore two children, who would become the first Creoles of Isle Brevelle. Isle Brevelle is known as the birthplace of Creole culture, and the island is named after Anne and her son, Jean Baptiste Brevelle II. The 30-mile long island was a land grant issued to Brevelle.

== Reconstruction ==
In 1979, the site obtained for the reconstruction of the fort is located on Cane River Lake (formerly the Red River) a few hundred yards from the original site. The fort was based upon Sieur Du Tisné and Broutin's plans and on extensive archival research in Louisiana, Canada and France. All of the metal hinges and latches were made at a local foundry and most of the 2,000 treated pine logs which form the palisade and approximately 250,000 board feet lumber for the buildings were sourced from within Natchitoches Parish. The fort is an attraction within the National Park Service's Cane River National Heritage Area . The site is also host to living history re-enactments of what life in the fort was like in the 1750s.

== See also ==
- Adai Caddo Indians of Louisiana
- Louisiana African American Heritage Trail
- Bayou Brevelle
- Melrose Plantation
- Oakland Plantation (Natchitoches Parish, Louisiana)
