= Jerry Huckaby =

American politician

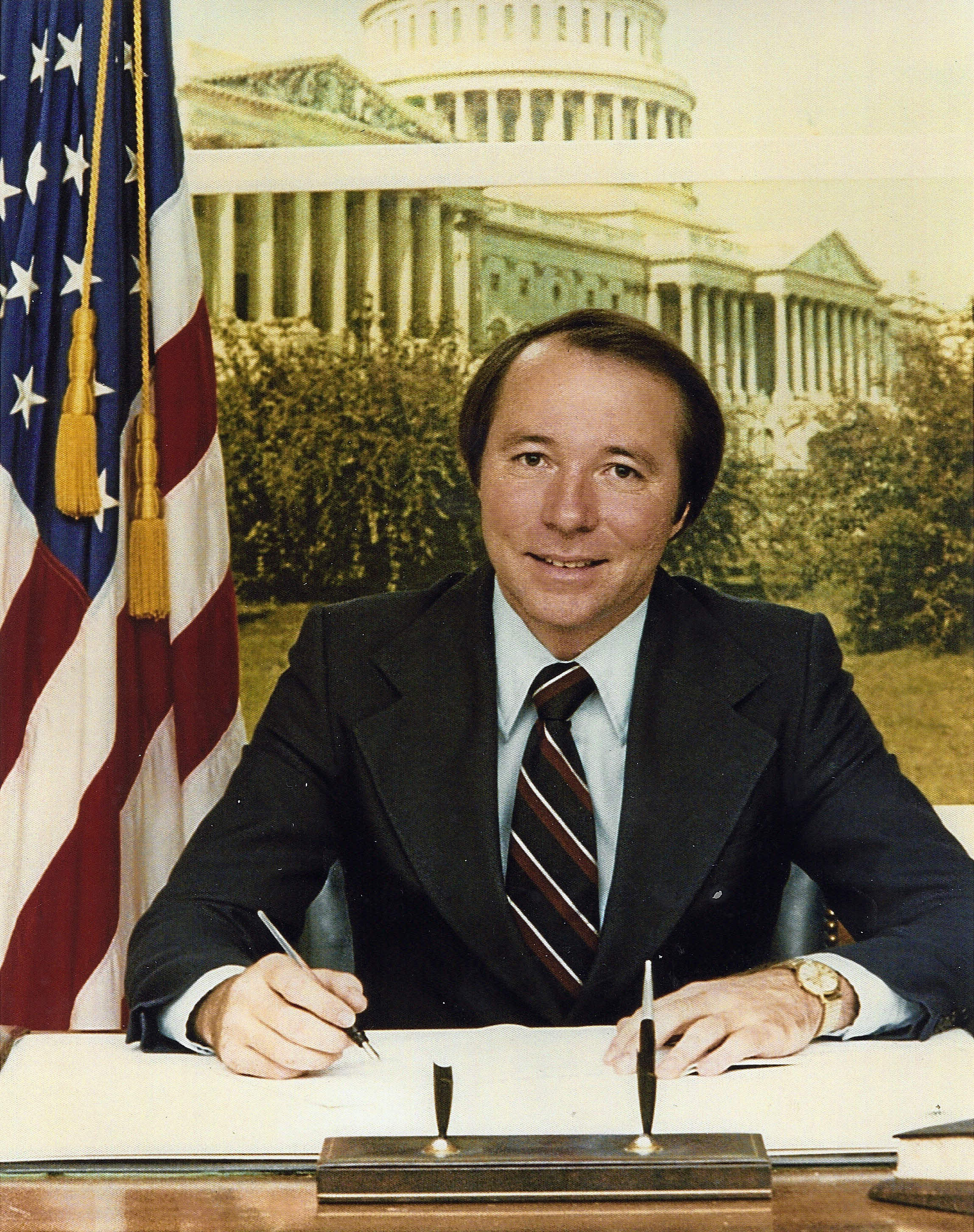
- Huckaby in 1977

Member of the U.S. House of Representatives from Louisiana's 5th district
- In office January 3, 1977 – January 3, 1993
- Preceded by: Otto Passman
- Succeeded by: Jim McCrery

Personal details
- Born: Thomas Jerald Huckaby; July 19, 1941 (age 84) Hodge, Louisiana, U.S.
- Party: Democratic
- Education: Louisiana State University (BS); Georgia State University (MBA)

Thomas Jerald Huckaby (born July 19, 1941) U.S. is an American politician who served in the United States House of Representatives from Louisiana's 5th congressional district for 16 years, from 1977 to 1993.

== Background ==
Thomas Huckaby was a member of the U.S. House of Representatives for Louisiana, first being elected in 1977. He represented the 5th district for 8 terms, losing his reelection bid in 1992. Throughout his tenure Huckaby served on the Agriculture Committee, the Budget Committee and the Interior Committee. He spearheaded legislation to create the Kisatchie Hills Wilderness, the Poverty Point National Monument, the Saline Bayou Wild and Scenic River, the Tensas River National Wildlife Refuge, and the Upper Darbonne National Wildlife Refuge. In his 16 years representing Louisiana, Huckaby introduced 81 bills, of which 16 were signed into law. Huckaby was elected to Louisiana's political hall of fame in 2012. After the re-drawing of the Louisiana legislative map, Huckaby was not successful in his 1992 reelection bid facing fellow representative Jim McCrery.

U.S. House of Representatives
Preceded by Otto Passman	Member of the U.S. House of Representatives from Louisiana's 5th congressional district 1977–1993	Succeeded by Jim McCrery
U.S. order of precedence (ceremonial)
Preceded by Pat Tiberi as Former U.S. Representative	Order of precedence of the United States as Former U.S. Representative	Succeeded by Jesse Jackson Jr. as Former U.S. Representative
