= Marsh terrace =

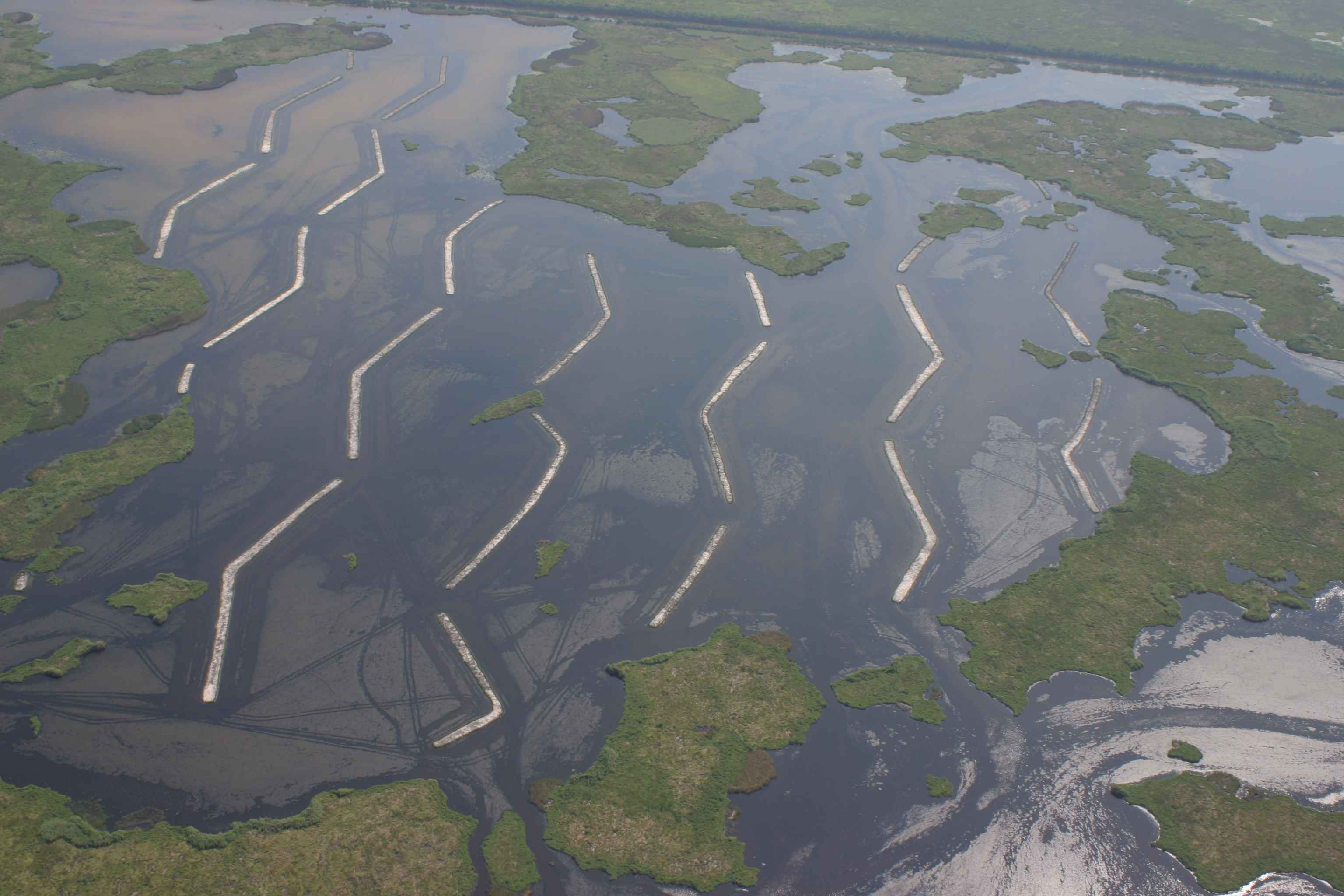
Chevron shaped marsh terraces

A marsh terrace is an artificially created berm that is built in a wetland to prevent erosion, reduce wave energy, and improve habitat for wildlife. Marsh terracing is most common throughout the upper Gulf Coast of the United States, where it is used to prevent coastal erosion, with 980 linear km (609 mi) having been built in Texas and Louisiana alone in the thirty years to 2020. The terraces catch sediment from rivers which is then colonized by plants to form marshland.

== Construction and design ==
The design of marsh terraces depends on the local conditions, such as wave strength and wind speed. There are several commonly used patterns, including chevrons (duck wings), straight lines, and square grids. Chevrons are the most effective pattern as wind can blow from any direction but there will still be calm water on at least one side of the chevron.

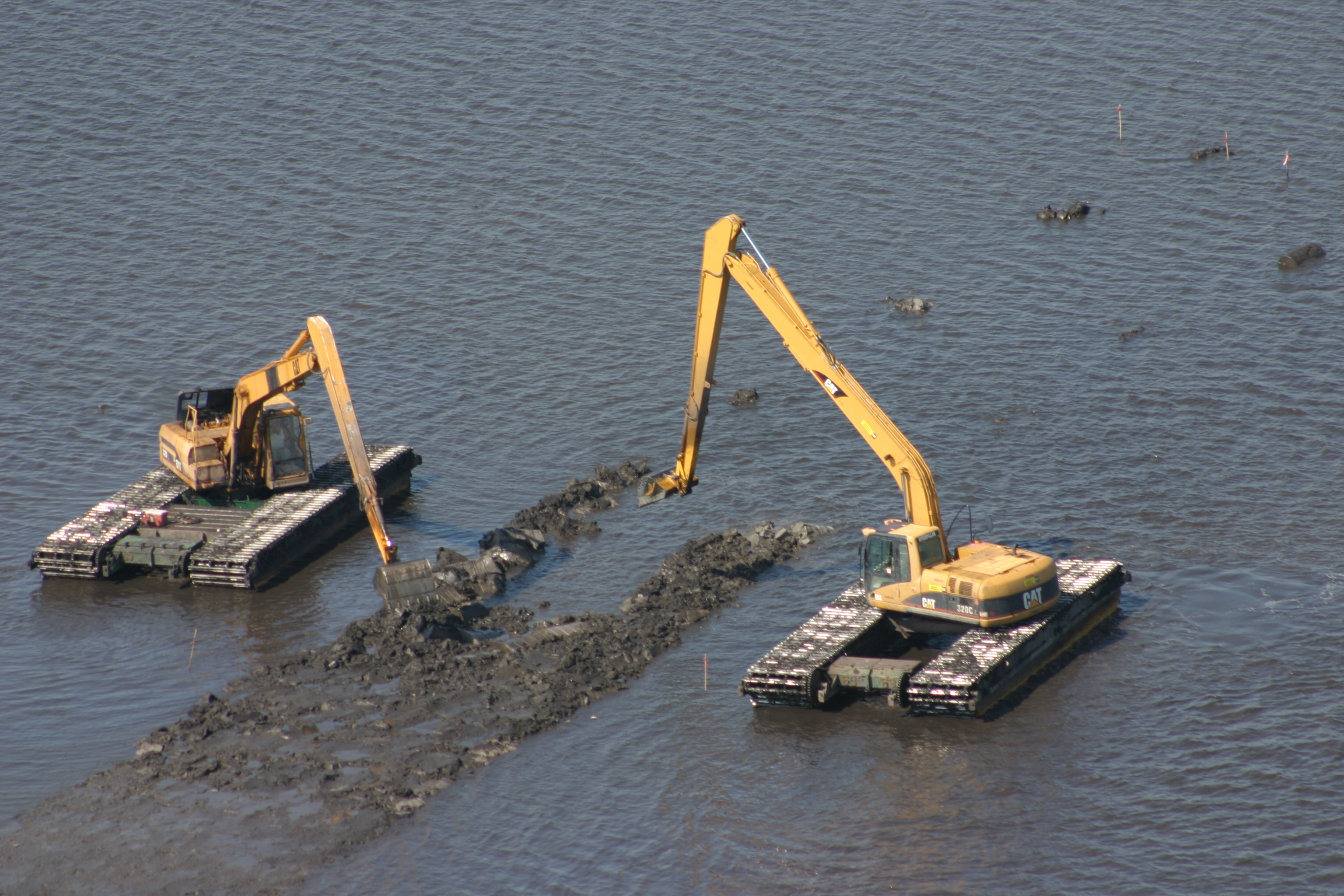
Terraces being built in Louisiana

One thing that must be considered is the type of soil, as some are more vulnerable to erosion than others. Soils heavy with clay and silt are more resistant than soils primarily composed of organic matter.

Terraces are often built in shallow coastal ponds that may have been former marshland that has eroded away over time. Large berms, usually two to five meters in width, are built with material that is either dredged at the site or brought in as fill from inland. The berms themselves are often only a meter in height above sea level which allows it to be occasionally inundated with water and create the proper coastal plant community.

Marshland terraces are a relatively new construction, so far has only been extensively used in the Gulf Coast of the United States. They were first built at the Sabine National Wildlife Refuge in 1990. In 2021, a plan to create marsh terraces in Virginia's Back Bay National Wildlife Refuge has been approved. This will be the first project of its kind to be done in the Mid-Atlantic region.

== Results ==
Being only constructed recently, there have not been a lot of published studies on the effects of marsh terracing. However, the existing results are promising. The terraces have a higher sediment accumulation rate compared to erosion, and are able to reduce wave strength by an average of 45%. The calmer waters allow sediment to settle which then promotes the growth of seagrasses which further hold down the sediment with their roots. Additionally, the terraces have been found to provide habitat for marsh wildlife such as seabirds and fish.
