= Kisatchie National Forest =

National forest in Louisiana, US

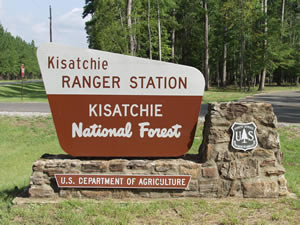

- Location within the United States
- Location: Louisiana, United States
- Coordinates: 31°29′30″N 93°11′33″W
- Area: 604,000 acres (2,440 km^{2}; 944 sq mi)
- Established: June 10, 1930
- Governing body: United States Forest Service
- Website: Kisatchie National Forest

Kisatchie National Forest

Kisatchie National Forest, the only National forest in Louisiana, United States, is located in the forested piney hills and hardwood bottoms of seven central and northern parishes. It is part of the Cenozoic uplands (some of Louisiana's oldest rocks) and has large areas of longleaf pine forests (a forest type that has declined significantly over the last century). It is one of the largest pieces of natural landscape in Louisiana, with some 604,000 acres (2,440 km^{2}) of public land, more than half of which is vital longleaf pine and flatwoods vegetation. These support many rare plant and animal species. There are also rare habitats, such as hillside seepage bogs and calcareous prairies. The forest also contains and provides a buffer for the Kisatchie Hills Wilderness, a nationally designated wilderness area that contributes to protecting biodiversity of the coastal plain region of the United States.

The forest was designated in 1930 during the administration of U.S. President Herbert Hoover.

The name Kisatchie is derived from a tribe of Kichai Indians of the Caddo Confederacy.

Kisatchie National Forest plays an important role in protecting representative examples of the landscape of northern Louisiana, particularly those that fall within the South Central Plains Ecoregion. The forest protects habitat for a wide array of plant species, including wild orchids and carnivorous plants. Two examples include the pale pitcher plant and rose pogonia orchid. Biologists have found 155 species of breeding or overwintering birds, 48 mammal species, 56 reptile species and 30 amphibian species. Rare animals include the Louisiana pine snake, the red-cockaded woodpecker, the Louisiana black bear and the Louisiana pearlshell mussel.

The forest also offers recreation activities including: bird watching, photography, backpacking, canoeing, all-terrain vehicle trails, boating, camping, cycling, fishing, hiking, horseback riding, hunting, mountain biking, picnicking and swimming. The forest has more than 40 developed recreation sites and over 100 miles (160 km) of trails for hiking, mountain biking and horseback riding.

Roads are known to cause significant damage to forests, prairies, streams and wetlands. Roads are particularly harmful to native populations of amphibians and reptiles that migrate to vernal pools. Kisatchie National Forest contains three significant roadless areas, established to protect native species: Cunningham Brake and Saline Bayou.

== Cunningham Brake ==
Cunningham Brake is a large cypress-tupelo gum swamp that also protects flows in Kisatchie Bayou.

== Saline Bayou ==
Saline Bayou

Saline Bayou has mixed forests associated with alluvial habitats, ranging from shortleaf pine to tupelo gum.

== Kisatchie Hills ==
A third large roadless area, the Kisatchie Hills, is protected under a different designation, as a wilderness area. More information of these important areas can be found in the Final Environmental Impact Statement for Kisatchie, prepared by the Forest Service in 1999.

== Prairie ==
Although forests dominate the landscape, scattered prairies can also be found. Natural prairies have been almost extirpated from Louisiana, mostly by clearing for agriculture. Less than one thousand acres of calcareous prairie may remain in the entire state, three pieces of which are associated with Kisatchie: the Kieffer prairie (769 acres), the historic Tancock Prairie (45 acres), and the historic Bartram Prairie (1,190 acres). The latter two are referred to as "historic" because they were mentioned in 1836 survey records; they have reverted to forest.

So thoroughly have the prairies of North America been cleared that remnants such as these are likely to be of national significance. The restoration of a natural fire regimen is the most important priority for maintaining and enhancing these prairies.

== Coverage ==
The forest consists of several large areas; and these are fragmented by private land ownership. The headquarters are in Pineville, but the Kisatchie National Forest has five ranger districts in the north-central area of the state: Calcasieu, Caney, Catahoula, Kisatchie and Winn. The forest lies in parts of seven parishes. In descending order of land area within the forest, they are Grant, Natchitoches, Winn, Rapides, Vernon, Claiborne, and Webster parishes.

== Calcasieu Ranger District ==
The Calcasieu Ranger district is the southernmost district, located between Alexandria, Leesville and DeRidder. The District Office is located on LA 28 West, two miles (3.2 km) east of Gardner and ten miles (16 km) west of Alexandria, Louisiana.

Wolf Rock Cave, the only known cave in Louisiana, is located just off Parish road 455 (locally known as Johnsonville road) in Vernon Parish. The 70-foot above ground cave is situated beside Bundick Creek and is a protected by two rock overhangs.

The district comprises the Evangeline and Vernon units:

=== Evangeline Unit ===
This district features Kincaid Lake, Valentine Lake, and The Wild Azalea National Recreation Trail Other areas include the Kincaid Lake Day-Use Area, the Kincaid Lake Group-Use Area, the Valentine Lake Day-Use Areas, Valentine Lake Group-Use Area, the Bayou Boeuf Research Natural Area, and the Castor Creek Scenic Area. The Wild Azalea Seep area is part of the Wild Azalea National Recreation Trail.

Campgrounds include three at Kincaid Lake, two at Valentine Lake, the Loran/Claiborne Trailhead Camp, the Evangeline Camp, the Ahtus Melder Camp and the Boy Scout Camp. The Ahtus Melder Camp is for equestrian riders utilizing the Claiborne Trails.

Trails in this district include the Wild Azalea National Recreation Trail, the Claiborne Trails, the Kincaid Lake Trails, the Valentine Lake Trail, the Lamotte Creek Trail, the Ouiski Chitto Creek (sometimes spelled Whiskey Chitto) Recreation Trail and, the Indian Ridge Trail.

The Evangeline Unit of the Calcasieu Ranger District also encompasses the remains of Camp Claiborne, a U.S. Army post during World War II. Camp Claiborne was the largest military installation in the United States and the third largest city in Louisiana. Today, part of the old camp is used as a U.S. Air Force bombing range.

=== Vernon Unit ===
This district features Fullerton Lake, Enduro Trailhead Camp, and Hunter's Camp. Day and group-use opportunities include The Fullerton Lake Day-Use Area, Fullerton Lake Group-Use Area, Little Cypress Day-Use Area, Little Cypress Group-Use Area, Blue Hole Day-Use Area, Blue Hole Group-Use Area, and Government Pond Recreation Area. Some activities have required fees.

Boating opportunities include in this district include kayaking and canoeing on Fullerton Lake, Little Cypress, Blue Hole, and Blue Hole Wildlife Viewing Structure.

Hiking trails in this area include Big Branch Trail, Ouiska Chitto Trail, Enduro Trail, Fullerton Mill Trail,' Ol Sarge Trail, and Turkey Pen Trail.

Other notable activities in the area include Cooter's Bog Special Interest Area, Drake's Creek Special Interest Area, Quiska Chitto Special Interest Area, and the Longleaf Scenic Area.

Animals in the area include the red-cockaded woodpecker (Picoides borealis). The red-cockaded woodpecker, often referred to as the RCW, is one of the few birds endemic to the United States and many colonies are in the Vernon Unit. The RCW only nest in cavities of specific trees. Having extremely specific habitat requirements lost by mass deforestation caused large population declines and the extinction of numerous colonies in the 20th century. It was listed as a Federal Endangered Species. All areas in this unit where RCW reside have been identified and are distinctly marked. The markings include a boundary of Department of Forestry Service signs and white paint markings on the boundary trees. Many of these habitats can be observed from the roadside of La-Forestry Rd. 410, known as Bailey Road, that runs from Rosepine to LA 10.

The Louisiana Statewide Red-cockaded Woodpecker Safe Harbor Program is a partnership between the Louisiana Department of Wildlife and Fisheries and the U.S. Fish and Wildlife Service to enlist the aid of non-federal property owners to help build and maintain adequate foraging habitat.

The wild turkey was a very important food animal to Native Americans, but it was eliminated from much of its range by the early 20th century. Large groups of these birds can be observed on or near LA-Forestry rds 430 (Marlow Road) and 431 (Drakes Fork Road) that is off LA 10 just west of Cravens.

The Calcasieu's Vernon Unit is frequently used by neighboring Fort Johnson for training and the military leases training access to many areas. Areas affected by military operations will be posted by Fort Johnson and Kisatchie.

== Caney Ranger District ==
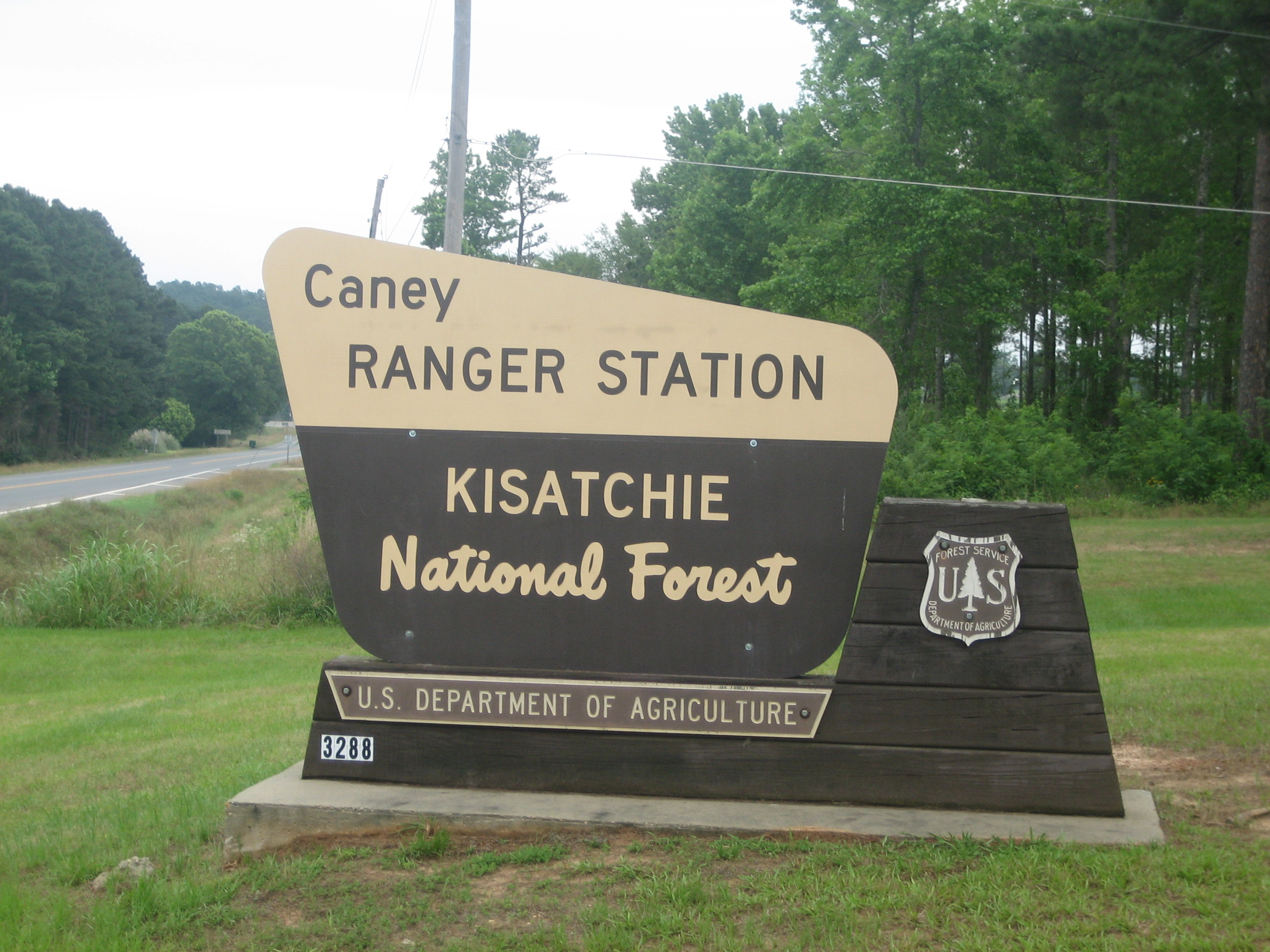
Caney Ranger Station at Homer in Claiborne Parish

The Caney Ranger district is located northeast of Shreveport south of the Arkansas state line near Homer, the seat of Claiborne Parish. It boasts the Sugar Cane National Recreation Trail along with Caney Lakes Recreation Area and Corney Lakes. The Caney Ranger District, unlike the rest of the Kisatchie National Forest, began its life in the hands of the Depression-era Resettlement Administration, which bought up marginal upland farmland. The Caney was not turned over to the Forest Service until 1959.

The district comprises the Caney Lake Unit, the Middle Fork Unit, and the Corney Lake Unit

=== Caney Lakes Unit ===
Camping opportunities in this unit include The Beaver Dam Campground on Upper Caney Lake and the Turtle Slide Campground on Lower Caney Lake in the Caney Lakes Recreation Complex.

Trail opportunities include The Sugar Cane National Recreation Trail inside the Caney Lakes Recreation Complex.

Day and group-use opportunities include The Caney Lakes Day-Use Area, the Caney Lakes Ski Beach Area, and the Caney Lakes Group-Use Area which are all located on Lower Caney Lake.

People desiring boating opportunities can enjoy The Upper Caney Lake Boat Launch Area, the Lower Caney Lake Boat Launch Area, and the South Shore Caney Lake Boat Launch Area. Fees are collected for certain activities in this unit.

=== Middle Fork Unit ===
The Middle Fork Unit of the Caney Ranger District has only two designated recreation facilities, both of which are designated hunter's camps and are opened year-around but only maintained for the hunting season. These primitive camps are Bucktail Camp and Turkey Trot Camp. These areas are ideal for wildlife and bird watchers, plant enthusiasts, and nature lovers.

=== Corney Lake Unit ===
Camping opportunities include the south shore campground, the north shore camp, and sugar creek hunter's camp. Day and group-use facilities include the south shore day/group-use area and the north shore day-use area.

Corney Lake has three separate boat launches. The first is the modern south shore day-use/boat launch, the second is the more primitive north shore boat launch, and the third is the all new Corney Bayou Launch.

Unlike other units, there are no designated trails within the Corney Lake Unit. Also, there are no fee areas within the Corney Lake Unit at any of the facilities provided.

== Catahoula Ranger District ==
The Catahoula Ranger district is located north of Pineville. The district features Stuart Lake Recreation Complex; hiking and biking along the Glenn Emery Trail; the original Louisiana State University site in Pineville; hunting in the Catahoula National Wildlife Refuge; and two ATV trails located in old Camp Livingston. The remains of Camp Livingston, a World War II-era U.S. Army installation, lie almost completely in the Catahoula Ranger District. Livingston was one of the Army's large training facilities and was at the epicenter of the famed Louisiana Maneuvers. The "Maneuvers," two large war games which took place over the summers of 1940 and 1941, played a key role in the preparation of the U.S. military for World War II combat.

Camping opportunities in this district include The Stuart Lake Campground, Bankston Camp, Highway 472 Camp, Pearson Camp, and Saddle Bayou Camp.

Opportunities for trails include The Camp Livingston Trails, The Glenn Emery Trail, and the Stuart Nature Trail.

The Stuart Lake Day-Use and Group-Use Areas and The Iatt Lake Observation Pier Day-Use Area are intended for day use.

The district also houses The Catahoula National Wildlife Management Preserve, consisting of 36,000 acres (150 km^{2}) of land set aside for the preservation of land for wildlife habitat. Hunters come from all around during hunting season to the Catahoula Preserve.

Catahoula Hummingbird and Butterfly Garden also resides in the area. Viewable year-around, the Catahoula Hummingbird and Butterfly Garden is best viewed in late spring through early fall. Seasonal butterflies and migratory hummingbirds frequent the garden quite often through the summer months.

The Stuart Seed Orchard was built by the Civilian Conservation Corps in the 1930s for the purpose of replanting clear-cut areas from the previous 30 years of unsupervised forest harvesting. A by-product of the seed orchard is the Stuart Lake Recreation Complex, built to water the seed orchards before the more modern irrigation systems was built.

== Kisatchie Ranger District ==
The Kisatchie Ranger district is located between Leesville and Natchitoches. Within the district are the protected areas of a national forest, national Preserve, and national wilderness area, that contains scenic trails as well as a scenic bayou and waterfalls.

Kisatchie Bayou is a tributary of Old River at Isle Brevelle. The bayou runs through a large portion of the national forest and is known for its clear waters, swimming holes and waterfalls. The Man in the Moon (1991 film) was filmed at Kisatchie Bayou.

Kisatchie Falls is a waterfall along Kisatchie Bayou in Natchitoches Parish, Louisiana near the border with Vernon Parish. It is one of the few waterfalls and the only Class II rapids in the state.

In 2007, the Kisatchie Ranger District was acknowledged with a Secretary of Agriculture award for heroism for actions relating to a 100-year flood that swept the district.

The Kisatchie Ranger District contains 102,000 acres (159 square miles; 41,000 hectares), that includes the 8,700 acres (3,500 ha) Kisatchie Hills Wilderness Area and the 38,000 acres (15,000 ha) National Red Dirt Wildlife Management Preserve

- The Longleaf Scenic Byway is 17-mile (27 km) in length. The byway is Forest Highway 59 / Parish Road 830.
- The Longleaf Vista Recreation Area which includes the sandstone bluffs.
- Kisatchie Bayou Recreation Area with white sandy beaches and rocky rapids of Kisatchie Bayou. This is a camping and day use area.
- Kisatchie Hills Wilderness that is a nationally designated wilderness area. The area consist of 8,700 acres bordered on the northwest side by Parish Road 339 (Montrose rd.) and the southwest and southern side by the Longleaf Trail Scenic Byway. The eastern border is mostly the National Forest boundary and on the southwest corner by LA 119 that is the terminus of the scenic byway. Kisatchie Wilderness is one of three wilderness areas in Louisiana. The other two are the 5,000 acre Breton Wilderness, within the Breton National Wildlife Refuge, and the 3345 acre Lacassine Wilderness within the Lacassine National Wildlife Refuge.
- The Red Dirt National Wildlife Management Preserve borders and is part of Kisatchie Hills Wilderness area.
- Sandstone Multi-Use Trail.
- Caroline Dormon Trail for horseback, hiking, biking. Named for Caroline Dormon.

== Winn Ranger District ==
The Winn Ranger District encompasses 164,000 acres (660 km^{2}) of Winn Parish, Natchitoches Parish, and Grant Parish in North Louisiana. It is in close proximity to the Winnfield area. Because of this close proximity, the Winn Ranger District and the Catahoula National Wildlife Management refuge has become a very popular destination for hunters during hunting season.

Gum Springs Recreation Area, located in an area of hilly terrain and natural springs, exhibits recreation design and construction from the Civilian Conservation Corps era of the 1930s while offering basic recreation opportunities of picnicking and camping. Currently being expanded, The Gum Springs Horse Camp and Trail offers activities for peoples interested in horse riding.

Cloud Crossing Recreation Complex lies directly on the banks of Saline Bayou and is a put-in/take-out point for boating or canoeing. Approximately 21 miles (34 km) of Saline Bayou was designated a National Wild and Scenic River because of its unique qualities. Bald cypress and other hardwood grow along the banks, often reflected in the bayou's quiet water.

Hikers can use The Dogwood Interpretive Trail, sponsored by the ARRP.

== Forest research and archaeology ==
The Palustris Experimental Forest is located within the Calcasieu Ranger District.

=== Bat research ===
There are 47 prominent bat species found in the United States, and each species contributes a unique service to their specific ecosystem, such as consuming insect pests, and thereby benefit both humans and livestock. A research investigation found that the occurrence of bats was correlated with the type of forest management implemented on the Kisatchie National Forest. Forest canopies with more open areas tended to increase bat occupancy.

=== Kisatchie National Forest Heritage Program ===
The Kisatchie National Forest Heritage Program is a program responsible for protecting archaeological sites and historic structures on the forest, including several Civilian Conservation Corps structures dating to the 1930s and 1940s such as Gum Springs Recreation Area.

== America the Beautiful Quarters ==
In 2015, the United States Mint began issuing the Kisatchie National Forest Quarter from the Denver and Philadelphia mints, designed by Susan Gamble. The quarter's design features a wild turkey in flight over blue stem grass with long leaf pine trees in the background.

== See also ==
- List of national forests of the United States
