= Shell Keys National Wildlife Refuge =

National Wildlife Refuge in Louisiana

- IUCN category IV (habitat/species management area)
- Location within the United States
- Location: Iberia Parish, Louisiana, United States
- Nearest city: New Iberia, Louisiana
- Coordinates: 29°25′15″N 91°50′45″W
- Established: 1907
- Governing body: U.S. Fish and Wildlife Service
- Website: Shell Keys National Wildlife Refuge

Shell Keys National Wildlife Refuge

Shell Keys National Wildlife Refuge is located in the offshore waters to the west of the Atchafalaya River Delta, south of Marsh Island Wildlife Management Area. It was established in 1907 and is one of the oldest refuges in the National Wildlife Refuge System.

== Southwest Louisiana National Wildlife Refuge Complex ==
The Southwest Louisiana National Wildlife Refuge Complex was formed by administratively combining the Cameron Prairie National Wildlife Refuge, East Cove National Wildlife Refuge, Sabine National Wildlife Refuge, Lacassine National Wildlife Refuge, and the Shell Keys NWR in 2004.

== Boundary ==
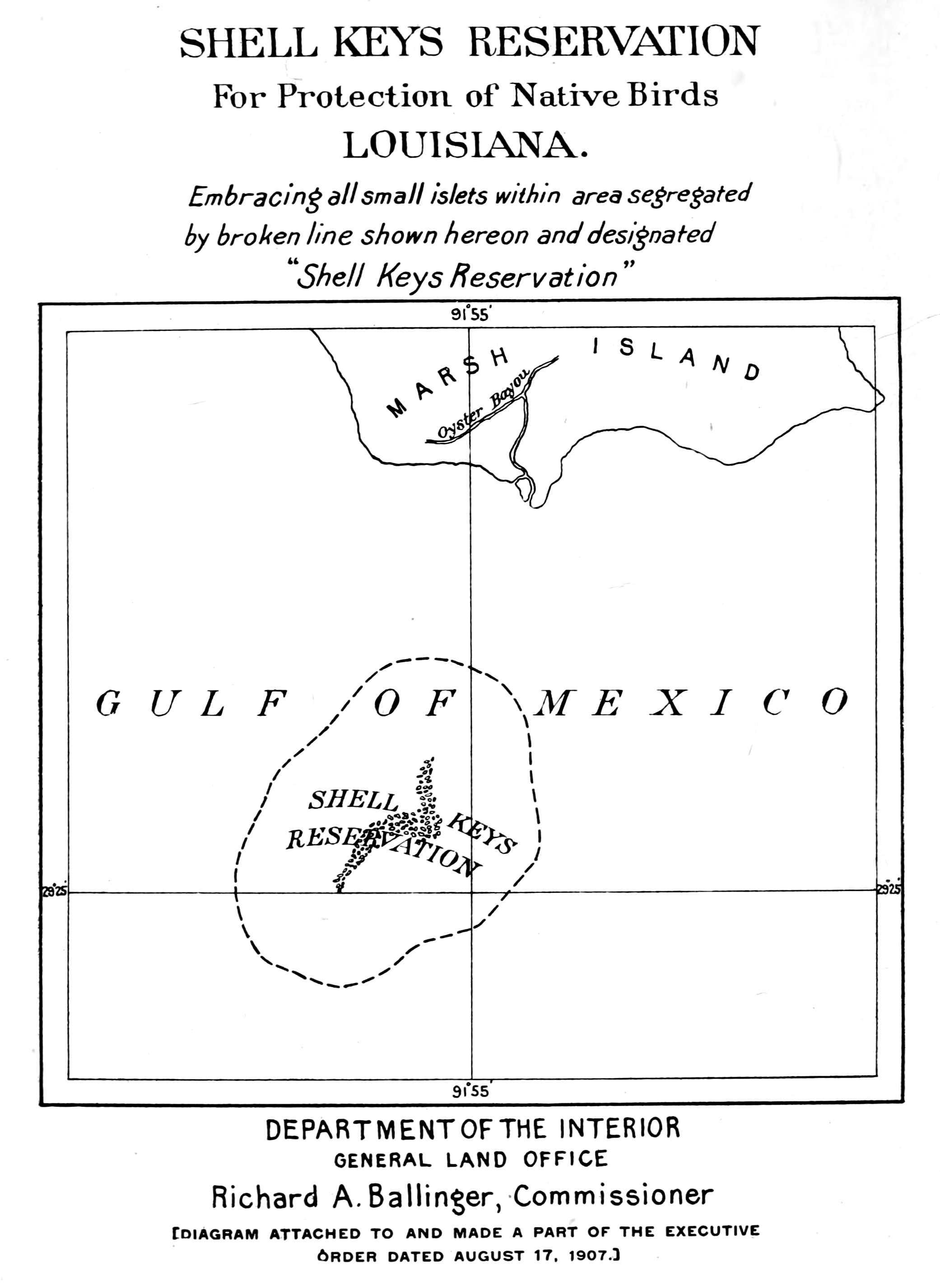
Map of the Shell Keys Reservation from Executive Order 682, establishing the refuge.

Due to coastal erosion, the refuge boundary is not well defined. It has been described as "... a small group of unsurveyed islets located in the Gulf of Mexico about three and one half miles south of Marsh Island (Louisiana), and approximately at latitude 29 degrees 26 minutes north, longitude 91 degrees 51 minutes west from Greenwich..". The boundary of the refuge has been interpreted to be those areas in this vicinity that are above mean high tide.

== Wildlife and habitat ==
For a number of years, there has been only one islet at this location. This islet is composed almost entirely of shell fragments. It is extremely dynamic and builds or recedes with passing storms. Vegetation is almost entirely lacking. Birds known to nest here include royal terns, sandwich terns, black skimmers, and laughing gulls. In addition, the islet is used at various times as a loafing area by white pelicans, brown pelicans, and various other species of terns and gulls. Recent hurricanes and storms have eroded the island to such an extent that no nesting has occurred since 1992. Public access to the refuge is restricted due to its remoteness.

== See also ==
- List of National Wildlife Refuges: Louisiana
