= Kisatchie Hills Wilderness =

Wilderness area in Louisiana, United States

- IUCN category Ib (wilderness area)
- Location within the United States Location within Louisiana
- Location: Louisiana, United States
- Coordinates: 31.503°N 93.004°W
- Area: 8,701 acres (35.21 km^{2})
- Established: 1980
- Governing body: U.S. Forest Service

Kisatchie Hills Wilderness

Kisatchie Hills Wilderness is a 8,701-acre (3,521 ha) designated wilderness area in the U.S. state of Louisiana. Contained within Kisatchie National Forest, the wilderness is managed by the U.S. Forest Service. In addition to a variety of wildlife, the area features terrain that is unusually rugged for Louisiana. Undeveloped except for its trail system, the area may be accessed only by foot or on horseback.

The wilderness is traversed by a 7-mile (11 km) trail, known as the Backbone Trail, which is popular with day hikers and overnight backpackers. There are also two shorter spur trails that branch off the Backbone Trail.

A sand-bottomed stream called Bayou Cypre (pronounced "seep") is fed by the many tributary streams that drain the wilderness area. Bayou Cypre flows out across the eastern boundary, and hikers must wade across it in order to traverse the complete Backbone Trail.

== See also ==
- List of wilderness areas of the United States
- Wilderness Act
- Kisatchie Bayou
