= The Man in the Moon (1991 film) =

1991 film by Robert Mulligan

- Theatrical release poster
- Directed by: Robert Mulligan
- Written by: Jenny Wingfield
- Produced by: Mark Rydell
- Starring: Sam Waterston; Tess Harper; Jason London; Emily Warfield; Reese Witherspoon
- Cinematography: Freddie Francis
- Edited by: Trudy Ship
- Music by: James Newton Howard
- Production company: Pathé Entertainment
- Distributed by: Metro-Goldwyn-Mayer
- Release date: October 4, 1991
- Running time: 99 minutes
- Country: United States
- Language: English
- Budget: $6.6 million
- Box office: $2.8 million

The Man in the Moon is a 1991 American coming of age drama film. It was the final film directed by Robert Mulligan before his death in 2008. Written by Jenny Wingfield, it stars Reese Witherspoon in her film debut, Sam Waterston, Tess Harper, Emily Warfield, and Jason London.

The film’s story, set in rural 1950s Louisiana, centers around Dani (Witherspoon), a 14-year-old tomboy who experiences first love and heartbreak when older boy Court (London) moves next door. The film received critical acclaim and made Roger Ebert’s list of the Top 10 Films of 1991.

== Plot ==
In the summer of 1957, Danielle "Dani" Trant is a 14-year-old girl in Louisiana who is close to her older sister, the college-bound Maureen. Dani is expected to help take care of younger sister Missy as their mother Abigail is pregnant, but she prefers to run off to the neighbor's creek to go skinny dipping. One day, she finds the creek occupied by her new neighbor, 17-year-old Court Foster. Court kicks Dani out and she takes an immediate dislike to him.

Later that day, Abigail tells Dani an old childhood friend is coming over for dinner with her children. Abigail's old friend turns out to be Marie Foster, a widow who has moved back to the area with her three sons, revealed to be Court and his younger brothers. When Dani is forced to accompany Court into town for groceries, the two start to get along and Dani soon develops a crush on him.

Meanwhile, Maureen breaks up with her boyfriend Billy Sanders after he tries to pressure her into having sex after a dance. Dani asks Maureen for advice on how to kiss a boy, and Maureen demonstrates by practicing on her hand. Dani and Court continue to go swimming during the hot summer days and become good friends. The two agree to meet up during the evening as Court has too much farm work to do during the day. That night, Dani and Court goof around in the water and nearly reach a point where they are about to kiss, but Court pushes Dani away and says she is a little girl who doesn't know what she's doing.

Dani runs home just as a thunderstorm breaks out. Abigail runs outside looking for Dani, but accidentally trips on a root in the process and suffers an injury. Dani's father Matthew races her to the hospital, where she is kept in order to treat a concussion and toxemia caused by her fall. When he returns home from the hospital, he punishes Dani, whipping her with his belt. The next day, Court brings food to the Trant house and apologizes to Dani for the other night, saying he would still like to be friends. The next time they go swimming the two share Dani's first kiss. Once Dani has made up with her father, he suggests that she invite Court over so he can get to know him better. When Court comes over for dinner, he finally meets Maureen. Dani can tell it is love at first sight for the two of them. While Dani visits her mother in the hospital, Court shows up at the Trant house where Maureen is babysitting Missy. Aware of her sister's feelings for Court, Maureen is initially reluctant to return his affections but ultimately gives in when he kisses her.

Over the next few days, Dani is alienated by Court. She goes to stay by her mother's side at the hospital as she goes into labor. Maureen has entered into a romance with Court, and the two consummate their love in a field. When Dani returns home with Abigail and the new baby, she witnesses Maureen sneaking back home and realizes she was with Court. Angry at her sister’s betrayal, she runs towards Court’s farm. A busy Court has been plowing the fields but gets distracted by daydreams of Maureen. He reaches out to grab his hat from a tree branch and falls off the tractor, landing under the blades of the disc harrow. Dani is seen running through the woods when she stumbles upon Court badly injured in the field being cradled by his inconsolable mother. She races back home to tell her father, who drives off in the direction of the incident breaking through the fence.

When Matthew returns home, he is visibly distraught, wearing some of Court's blood on his clothes, the family realizes that Court has died from his injuries. Maureen hides her pain at first, while Dani bursts into tears. After Court's funeral, Dani continues to be angry at Maureen for stealing Court away from her. Matthew tells Dani that although she has a right to be hurt, being mad won't bring Court back, and Maureen will be her sister for life. Dani comforts Maureen as she weeps on Court's fresh grave, and the film ends with Maureen and Dani talking on the porch at night as the summer draws to a close, looking up at the moon and becoming close again.

== Cast ==
- Sam Waterston as Matthew Trant
- Tess Harper as Abigail Trant
- Gail Strickland as Marie Foster
- Reese Witherspoon as Danielle "Dani" Trant
- Jason London as Court Foster
- Emily Warfield as Maureen Trant
- Bentley Mitchum as Billy Sanders
- Ernie Lively as Will Sanders
- Dennis Letts as Doc White
- Earleen Bergeron as Eileen Sanders
- Anna Chappell as Mrs. Taylor
- Brandi and Sandi Smith as Missy Trant
- Derek and Spencer Ball as Foster Twins

== Production ==
The Man in the Moon marked the film debut of then-14-year-old Reese Witherspoon. Director Mulligan commented that casting her in the role of Dani was:

...risky business, to say the least. We had a casting team that went out and saw several thousand kids and tested them on video. When I saw Reese's test, she just jumped off the screen, simply as a personality. I couldn't tell whether she could act or not, but she's got a wonderful face and there's a brightness and intelligence there. Then, when I tested her in Santa Monica, a strange breakthrough took place. Early in the movie, Dani is a bit of a tomboy. Reese was trying to project this in a scene where she had to get angry with the boy, but it had a false ring to it. Because in real life she isn't a tomboy. She's a real "girl" girl. Just before we did another rehearsal, I told her I wanted her to chew gum. Well, she started chewing gum and all of a sudden the performance happened. She was tough. Strong. Direct... the scene worked. Like that. In an instant, it was there. What was marvelous was, at the end of the scene, Reese knew that something happened. Her compass, her sense of what's real, kicked in. The motor was running and she knew it. It was funny because she said: "Can I always chew gum?" ... I said: "Yeah."

The film was shot by Academy Award-winning cinematographer Freddie Francis. As Witherspoon was clearly a minor at the time of filming, her parents were on set during filming of the skinny dipping scene. The waterhole and swimming scenes were filmed on location at Kisatchie Bayou and Kisatchie Falls in Natchitoches Parish, Louisiana. The area is part of Kisatchie National Forest.

== Reception ==
=== Critical response ===
On the review aggregator website Rotten Tomatoes, 91% of 22 critics' reviews are positive, with an average rating of 7.9/10. The website's consensus reads: "It's sentimental, and some viewers may feel manipulated by the melodramatic final act, but The Man in the Moon offers a finely drawn coming-of-age story with an excellent cast—including Reese Witherspoon in her film debut." Metacritic, which uses a weighted average, assigned the film a score of 73 out of 100, based on 18 critics, indicating "generally favorable" reviews.

Janet Maslin of The New York Times praised the performances of Waterston, Harper, and Strickland. Maslin also wrote, "Mr. Mulligan also gets an outstandingly natural performance out of Miss Witherspoon, who has no trouble carrying a lot of the film single-handedly. It falls to her to remind the audience that this story is at heart about a family, and she does."

The film was highly commended by Roger Ebert, who awarded the film four stars in his review and included it at No. 8 in his Top 10 list of the best films of 1991. He said:

Nothing else [Mulligan] has done... approaches the purity and perfection of The Man in the Moon. As the film approached its conclusion without having stepped wrong once, I wondered whether he could do it - whether he could maintain the poetic, bittersweet tone, and avoid the sentimentalism and cheap emotion that could have destroyed this story. Would he maintain the integrity of this material? He would, and he does.

=== Box office ===
In the United States and Canada, The Man in the Moon grossed $2.8 million at the box office, against a budget of $6.6 million.

== Versions ==
Later, Mulligan became disenchanted with how the film was edited and cut by airlines, particularly American and Delta Air Lines, for in-flight showings. He became so disturbed by these airline edits to the picture that he insisted that his name be removed from the credits of the film on the airline version.
