= Wild Azalea Trail =

Hiking & Outdoor Recreation

Wild Azalea Trail is a 23.9 mile moderately trafficked point-to-point trail located near Woodworth, Louisiana, that features beautiful wild flowers and is rated as moderate. The trail is used for hiking and mountain biking and is accessible year-round. Dogs are allowed on the trail.

The Wild Azalea Trail is part of the Kisatchie National Forest, and it has been designated by the Chief of the Forest Service as a National Recreation Trail. Located in the Evangeline Unit of the Calcasieu Ranger District, the trail's end points are at Valentine Lake Recreation Area, and near the town of Woodworth. The trail is bisected about midway by Louisiana Highway 488 and it is accessible from Forest Service roads at several other points. The trail is designated for foot or mountain biking traffic only.

Traversing flat to rolling terrain, the trail winds through pine hills and hardwood bottoms, passing through managed forest areas, clearings and untouched areas. The trail route is marked with yellow diamond-shaped badges.

March and April are the best times to spot the Wild Azaleas for which the trail is named. Camping is permitted adjacent to the trail, but campsites must be at least 30 feet from the trail center-line. All trash carried in on the trail must be carried out.

A racing event known as the Wild Azalea Trail Challenge, which includes both trail running and mountain biking races of various distances, has been conducted each January on the trail beginning in 2013 and continuing through 2020.
