= Jenny Wingfield =

American novelist

Jenny Wingfield is an American screenwriter and novelist.

Born in Fountain Hill, Arkansas, Wingfield spent much of her childhood in Louisiana, where her father was a preacher. She attended Southern State College (now Southern Arkansas University) in Magnolia, and after graduating taught languages for several years.

Her screenwriting credits have included the films The Man in the Moon and The Outsider, as well as Hallmark Hall of Fame's A Dog Named Christmas, which was the winner of the 2010 Genesis Award. Her debut novel, The Homecoming of Samuel Lake was published in 2011.

== Filmography ==
- A Dog Named Christmas (2009)
- Roper and Goodie (2003)
- The Outsider (2002)
- The Lion King 2: Simba's Pride (1998)
- The Man in the Moon (1991)

== Bibliography ==
- The Homecoming of Samuel Lake (2011) Random House: ISBN 0385344082
