= Kisatchie Falls =

Rapids in Natchitoches Parish, Louisiana, US

- Rapids / low waterfall
- Location in Louisiana Kisatchie Falls (the United States)
- Coordinates: 31°24′30″N 93°07′34″W
- Location: Natchitoches Parish, Louisiana, United States
- Part of: Kisatchie National Forest
- Offshore water bodies: Kisatchie Bayou

Kisatchie Falls is a named rapid or low waterfall on Kisatchie Bayou in the Kisatchie National Forest in Natchitoches Parish, Louisiana, near Robeline. The site is near the Kisatchie Bayou Recreation Complex and is part of the Kisatchie Ranger District. The feature is described as sliding rapids and does not meet the minimum criteria for classification as a waterfall.

Kisatchie Falls was used as a filming location for the 1991 film The Man in the Moon.

== Geography and description ==
Kisatchie Falls is located along Kisatchie Bayou in the Kisatchie Ranger District of Kisatchie National Forest. The ranger district includes 20 miles of canoeing or kayaking on Kisatchie Bayou, as well as wilderness hiking trails, multiple-use trails and the Longleaf Trail Scenic Byway.

Kisatchie Falls is described as sliding rapids on Kisatchie Bayou rather than a qualifying waterfall, with lidar and aerial imagery showing a drop of less than one meter.

== Recreation ==
The nearby Kisatchie Bayou Recreation Complex includes a primitive campground and a day-use area. The campground has 17 walk-in campsites and one drive-in campsite, with tent pads, barbecue pits and lantern posts. Restrooms and trash receptacles are available, but no water is available at the campground.

The day-use area includes vault restrooms, trash receptacles, picnic tables, fire rings and steps to the bank of Kisatchie Bayou. Fishing is a common activity in the area, with bass, perch, sunfish and catfish among possible catches.

== Name ==
The name "Kisatchie" is associated with the Kichai people of the Caddoan Confederacy. The name was derived from a Kichai group who called themselves "Kitsatchie"; the name could possibly derived from the Kichai self-name K'itsai.

== In popular culture ==
Kisatchie Falls was used as a filming location for the 1991 film The Man in the Moon. The Natchitoches Film Trail has listed Kisatchie Falls, just off Louisiana Highway 118 near Robeline, among the film's locations. lack Lake and Kisatchie Falls provided the setting for Dani and Court's swimming-hole scenes.

== See also ==
- Natchitoches, Louisiana
- Robeline, Louisiana
- Anne des Cadeaux
