= Southwest Louisiana National Wildlife Refuge Complex =

National Wildlife Refuge complex in Louisiana

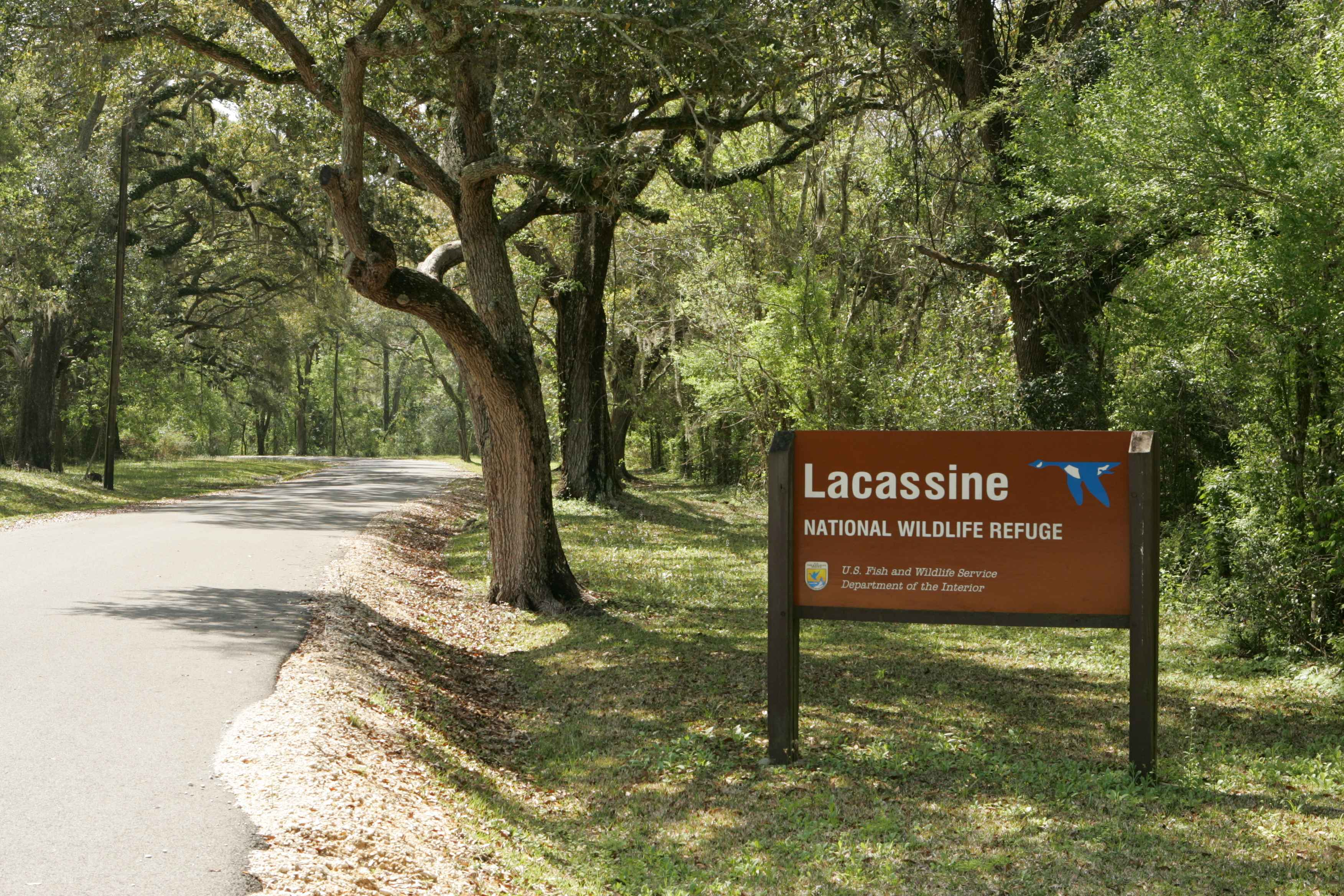
- Entrance to the Lacassine NWR of the Southwest Louisiana NWR Complex
- Area: 184,000 acres (740 km^{2})
- Governing body: U.S. Fish and Wildlife Service
- Website: Southwest Louisiana NWR Complex

The Southwest Louisiana National Wildlife Refuge Complex is a National Wildlife Refuge complex in the state of Louisiana. The refuge has more than 184,000 acres of land in four National Wildlife Refuges in southwest Louisiana.

== Refuges within the complex ==
The Southwest Louisiana National Wildlife Refuge Complex consists of four federal wildlife refuges in southwest Louisiana: Cameron Prairie National Wildlife Refuge, Sabine National Wildlife Refuge, Lacassine National Wildlife Refuge, and Shell Keys National Wildlife Refuge. These national wildlife refuges were created to provide support and protection as well as to provide winter habitat for migratory waterfowl.

== See also ==
- East Cove National Wildlife Refuge
