= A Dog Named Christmas =

2009 American/Canadian television film

- Written by: Jenny Wingfield
- Directed by: Peter Werner
- Starring: Linda Emond; Noel Fisher; Bruce Greenwood
- Theme music composer: Jeff Beal
- Countries of origin: Canada; United States
- Original language: English

Production
- Producer: Brent Shields
- Running time: 95 minutes
- Production company: Hallmark Hall of Fame

Original release
- Network: CBS
- Release: November 29, 2009

Related
- The Courageous Heart of Irena Sendler; When Love Is Not Enough: The Lois Wilson Story

A Dog Named Christmas is a 2009 American/Canadian television film that debuted on CBS as a Hallmark Hall of Fame movie on November 29, 2009. The film was produced by Brent Shields, directed by Peter Werner and written by Jenny Wingfield, who based the script from a novel of the same name by Greg Kincaid. It was filmed in Southey, Saskatchewan and the surrounding area.

== Plot ==
A tale of a young man with a learning disability, named Todd McCray (Noel Fisher) living with his parents in the rural midwest. The story takes place over a two-week period over the Christmas holidays when the local animal shelter launches an "Adopt a dog for Christmas" program. Todd's unconditional love for animals enables him to embark on an endeavour to ensure that as many dogs as possible get adopted by the local community.

The Criterion Collection Blu-ray release of 2009 film A Boy Named Christmas.

One dog in particular has grabbed Todd's heart and through intermittent flashbacks, viewers slowly discover the reasons for his father's reluctance to fully support Todd's efforts.

== Cast ==
- Linda Emond as Mary Ann McCray
- Noel Fisher as Todd McCray
- Bruce Greenwood as George McCray
- Carrie Genzel as Brianna Lewis
- Trenna Keating as Faye McCray

== Production ==
A Dog Named Christmas is the 237th presentation by Hallmark Hall of Fame, the long-running anthology program of American television films. It was based on a novel of the same name by Greg Kincaid, which was published in 2008. He wrote the story almost ten years prior for his wife, Michale Ann, and his five children, who ranged in age from 9 to 13. Kincaid said his family hated the original story, particularly because of the unhappy ending. Kincaid rewrote the story over the next year, with a new ending that his family liked better. He named a character in the story after each of his children.

The novel was fast-tracked into a film production in January 2009. During the film's original broadcast on CBS on November 29, 2009, the network sponsored a nationwide "Foster a Lonely Pet" program with Petfinder.com, an online database of adoptable pets, which included more than 2,000 shelters and animal-rescue groups across North America. After the end credits, a public service announcement was aired featuring Greg Kincaid describing the promotion.

== Reception ==
In its original American broadcast on November 29, 2009, A Dog Named Christmas was seen by 18.7 million households, according to the Nielsen ratings. In the ratings, the movie outperformed NBC's Sunday Night Football broadcast of the NFL game between the Pittsburgh Steelers and the Baltimore Ravens, which drew 17.3 million households. It was also seen by more households than CBS's 60 Minutes at 14.3 million and ABC's Desperate Housewives at 12.6 million, and outperformed Fox's The Simpsons (9 million) and Family Guy (8.5 million).

== Location ==
The movie was shot in the Southey and Earl Grey area, located in Saskatchewan, Canada.

== Prequel ==
In 2013 a made-for-television prequel to A Dog Named Christmas was released. It is entitled Christmas with Tucker and based on a book with the same name by Greg Kincaid. Gage Munroe plays young George McCray while James Brolin and Barbara Gordon play his grandparents, Bo and Cora McCray. Filmed in Northern Ontario, Canada, Christmas with Tucker is about thirteen-year-old George coping with the death of his father. He is helped through his struggles by his friendship with a dog named Tucker.

== See also ==
- List of Christmas films
