= Lacassine National Wildlife Refuge =

Wildlife refuge in Louisiana

- IUCN category IV (habitat/species management area)
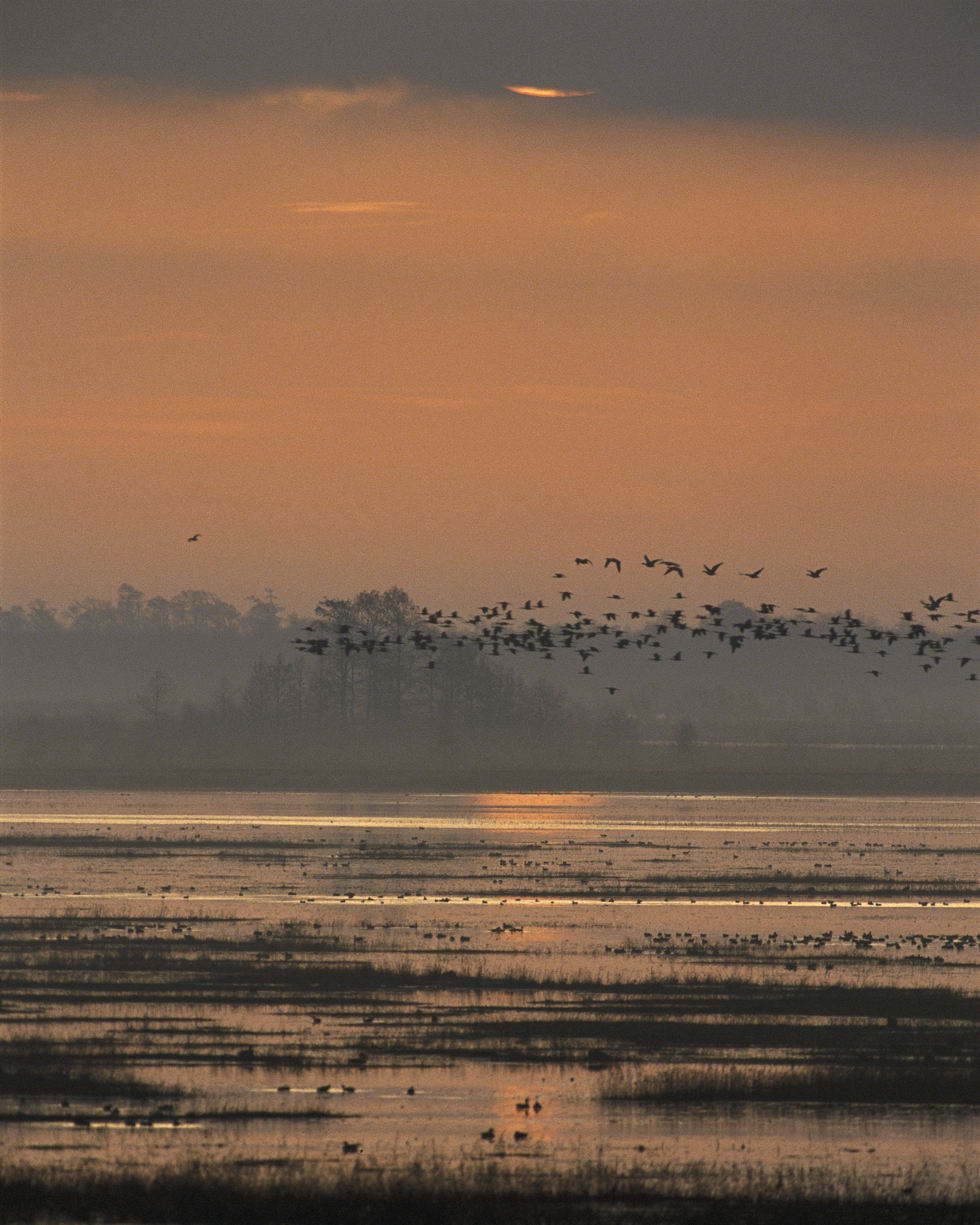
- Sunset on the marsh at Lacassine National Wildlife Refuge

- Location within the United States
- Location: Cameron and Evangeline parishes, Louisiana
- Nearest city: Lake Arthur, Louisiana
- Coordinates: 29°57′31″N 92°52′01″W
- Area: 35,000 acres (140 km^{2})
- Established: 1937
- Governing body: U.S. Fish and Wildlife Service
- Website: Lacassine National Wildlife Refuge

Lacassine National Wildlife Refuge

Lacassine National Wildlife Refuge is located in Cameron and Evangeline Parishes in southwestern Louisiana, was established in 1937 by Executive Order No. 7780 as "a refuge and breeding ground for migratory birds and other wildlife". The refuge is nearly 35,000 acres (140 km^{2}) in size, including 653 acres (2.64 km^{2}) leased from the Cameron Parish School Board. The Evangeline Parish unit is called Duralde Prairie and is currently being developed. It is located south of the city of Eunice.

== Southwest Louisiana National Wildlife Refuge Complex ==
The refuge, along with Cameron Prairie National Wildlife Refuge, East Cove National Wildlife Refuge, Sabine National Wildlife Refuge, and the Shell Keys National Wildlife Refuge was included in the forming of Southwest Louisiana National Wildlife Refuge Complex in 2004.

== History ==
The refuge was formed with 13,000 acres (5,300 ha) purchased from The Lacassane Company. The land had previously been part of two plantations, the Illinois Plantation and the Lowery Plantation, and purchased for $51,774.00. The mineral rights were reserved but included in the consideration and were subjugated to a mineral servitude by covenant. Easement was established as well as a timeline. A 2003 Third Circuit court decision led to a 2006 decision, Waterfowl Limited Liability Company v. United States, in the United States Court of Appeals, Fifth Circuit, resulted in a reversal and the case remanded.

In 1976 the United States Congress designated 3,345.6 acres (1,353.9 ha) of the southern portion as the Lacassine Wilderness.

== Wildlife and habitat ==
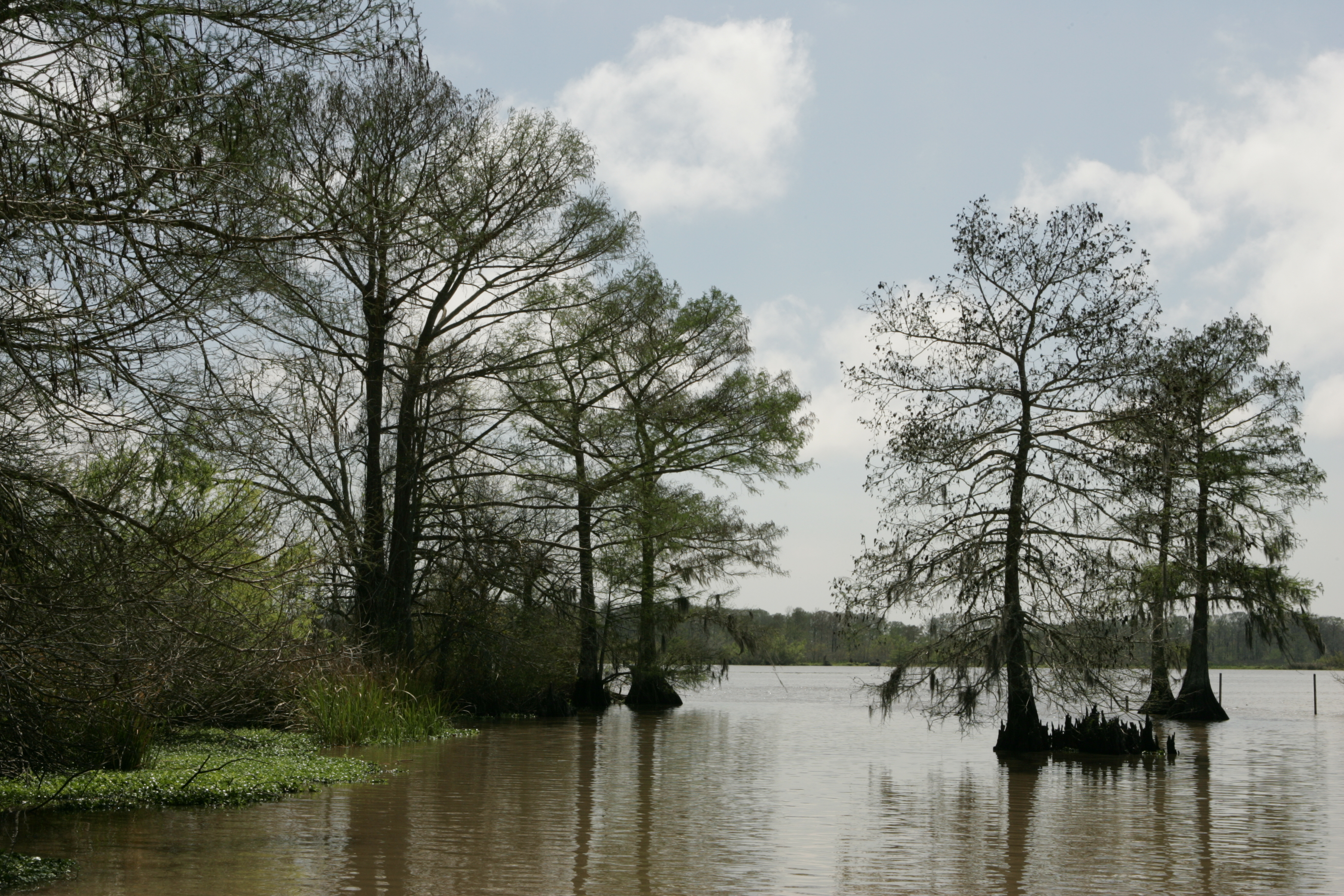
Bald cypress within Lacassine National Wildlife Refuge

The vegetation types occurring on the refuge are primarily water-tolerant grasses, sedges, and shrubs. Vegetation in the undeveloped marshes is dominated by bulltongue and maidencane. The habitat is divided into 16,500 acres (67 km^{2}) of natural, freshwater marsh and open water, 16,000 acres (65 km^{2}) of managed, freshwater marsh (Lacassine Pool), 2,200 acres (8.9 km^{2}) of rice, wheat, soybean, and natural moist soil fields, 350 acres (1.4 km^{2}) of flooded gum and cypress trees, and 350 acres (1.4 km^{2}) of restored tallgrass prairie.

Most wildlife species found on the refuge are those indigenous to the marshes of coastal Louisiana. Nesting colonies of wading birds such as ibis, roseate spoonbills, and egrets, alligators, and furbearers such as mink, otter, and raccoon and nutria are found on the refuge. Threatened and endangered species that have used the refuge include bald eagles, peregrine falcons, and Louisiana black bear.

Several hundred thousand ducks and geese use the refuge as wintering habitat while wood ducks, fulvous and black-bellied whistling ducks, and mottled ducks nest on the refuge during the breeding season. The refuge offers fishing, hunting, boating, wildlife observation, and hiking.

Lacassine NWR, known for attracting thousands of pintails each winter (a peak of 300,000), has also seen the effects of the decreasing populations. The refuge hosted numbers well over 100,000 until the mid-1980s then saw the peaks reduced by half in the 1990s. Drought years in the mid-2000s caused a decline from 30,000 down to around 18,000. The birds are concentrated in the northwest and northeast sections of the Pool.

== Management ==
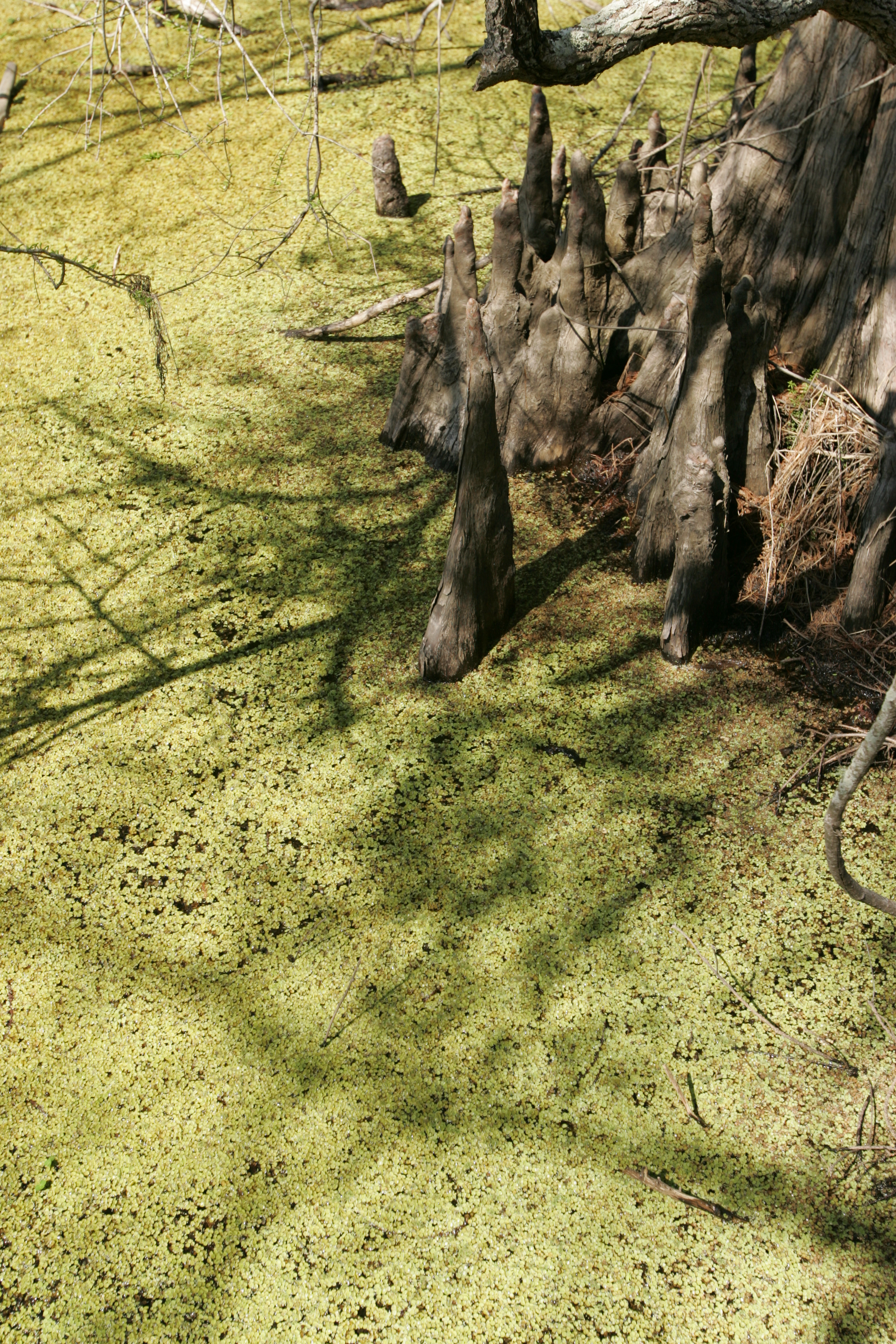
Bald cypress knees in duckweed

Lacassine NWR is managed intensively for waterfowl and other Louisiana coastal wetland species. The refuge has a wetland management program in which water levels are manipulated for managing naturally occurring marsh and moist soil plants, and a Copeland management program where crops are planted to provide food for wintering waterfowl that migrate down the Mississippi and Central Flyways.

Habitat is made more attractive to waterfowl and shorebirds by mechanical methods and flooding with costs reimbursed to the landowner or farmer. The refuge also has an active coastal prairie restoration program and a prescribed burning program. Native prairies and marshes are periodically burned on a 3-5 year rotational basis to invigorate native grasses and forbs, and to set back cool season plant growth or to reduce the fuel load and organic accumulations in the marshes.

Lacassine has a Wilderness Management program to help in managing the 3,445-acre (13.94 km^{2}) wilderness area found on the refuge and an oil and gas program to help minimize disturbance from mineral owner's activities. An alligator trapping program is used to manage the refuge's American alligator population. The refuge also has an active volunteer/intern program. There are unproductive orphan wells in various dilapidated shape, creating not only an eyesore but ecological concerns. The Bipartisan Infrastructure Law (November 15, 2021) provided funding, as well as funding from the Department of the Interior, to plug and remove eleven wells and structures.

== Recreation ==
Hunting and fishing are two of the most popular refuge activities. Bird watching is also very popular, with a bird list available at the refuge or online. A nature drive, foot trails, and observation towers are available year-round. An active volunteer program provides additional opportunities and students are able to earn college credits through an internship at the refuge.

== See also ==
- List of National Wildlife Refuges: Louisiana
