= The Lacassane Company =

- Type: Private
- Industry: Land management; agriculture; real estate; natural resources
- Founded: 1929; 97 years ago
- Headquarters: Lake Charles, Louisiana, United States
- Key people: William D. Blake (president)
- Products: Native seed and ecotype plant materials (via subsidiary)
- Subsidiaries: Louisiana Native Seed Company; The Lacassane Club
- Website: lacassane.com

The Lacassane Company is a privately held land management and real estate company based in Lake Charles, Louisiana. It owns and manages approximately 21,000 acres of agricultural land, marsh and coastal prairie in Jefferson Davis, Cameron and Beauregard parishes, where it operates rice and cattle enterprises, leases land for oil and gas development and manages wetlands mitigation banks and guided hunting operations. The company is also the parent of the Louisiana Native Seed Company and the Lacassane Club, a private waterfowl hunting club.

== History ==
Founded in 1929, by eight Lake Charles area businessmen, with land purchased from Jim Gardiner. The company was formed with 2250 common shares of stock with share-holders including, W. P. Weber, H. G. Chalkley, C. O. Noble, Henry Pomeroy, George M. King and Frank Roberts, M. J. Muller, and purchased 21,000 acres that included farm machinery, implements, stock, and cattle bought for $380,000.00, that included what was the Lowery and Illinois plantations, that became known as "The Illinois Plant", and "The Lowery Plant".

The Lacassane company continued with the previous form of tenant farming, increasing the original cattle herd, establishing trapping, hunting, oil and gas leases, and then the wetlands mitigation project. The Lacassine National Wildlife Refuge was established in 1937, when the company sold 13,000 acres (5,300 ha) south of the Illinois Plant to the United States Government for $51,774.00.

== Operations ==
The Illinois Plant is called the Lacassane Coastal Prairie Mitigation Bank and the Ragley property, in conjunction with the "Calcasieu Mitigation Bank" and partnered with Ecosystem Investment Partners (EIP), is known as the Bill Jackson Longleaf Savannah Mitigation Bank. Both have been designated (through The Lacassane Company) by the Corps of Engineers as a mitigation bank providing ecosystem services to the public in the form of Environmental mitigation (compensatory mitigation) to ensure the no net loss wetlands policy is followed to prevent Biodiversity loss that keeps the greenhouse debt in check. The Lacassane Company partnered with The Coastal Plain Conservancy to hold conservation servitudes on the land. The banks are monitored and maintained by Wildlands, Inc., an environmental consulting and plant propagation company.

The company operations now include land leases for waterfowl (Waterfowl Limited Liability Company) and other hunting, cattle grazing, alligator hide and egg harvesting, oil and gas exploration, and wetland projects. A pumping system through canals, laterals, the Bell City ditch, the Lacassine Bayou and the Mermentau River provides irrigation for the farming operations. The company's SIC code (Lessors of Real Property, NEC) is 6519 and the NAICS CODE (Lessors of Other Real Estate Property) is 531190.

=== Louisiana Native Seed Company ===
In 2006, the company became the parent of Louisiana Native Seed Company, which supplies native seed and plant materials used in restoration and conservation projects. A 2012 Natural Resources Conservation Service list of conservation seed vendors in Louisiana included Louisiana Native Seed Company as a vendor.

=== The Lacassane Club ===
The Lacassane Club is a private waterfowl hunting club operated as part of the company’s land-leasing and hunting activities in southwest Louisiana.

The Lacassane Club was founded in 2013, as a subsidiary of The Lacassane Company, on 14,000 of the 21,000 acres owned by the company. The company offers personal and corporate hunting memberships that include access to the lodge, separate sleeping quarters called casitas and a 3 bedroom, 2 bath house called Jed's Cabin. The staff includes the club manager, a head guide, 4 other guides, an executive chef, and a Zoology/Wildlife Management biologist.

== Legal matters ==
The company has been a party to litigation involving mineral interests in Louisiana, including a 2003 decision of the Louisiana Third Circuit Court of Appeal concerning partition of mineral interests. A related federal appellate case involving Lacassane Company and Waterfowl Limited Liability Company addressed issues connected to mineral rights affecting federal lands in the same region.

== See also ==
- Lacassine National Wildlife Refuge
- Mitigation banking
