= Sabine National Wildlife Refuge =

National Wildlife Refuge in southwestern Louisiana

- IUCN category IV (habitat/species management area)
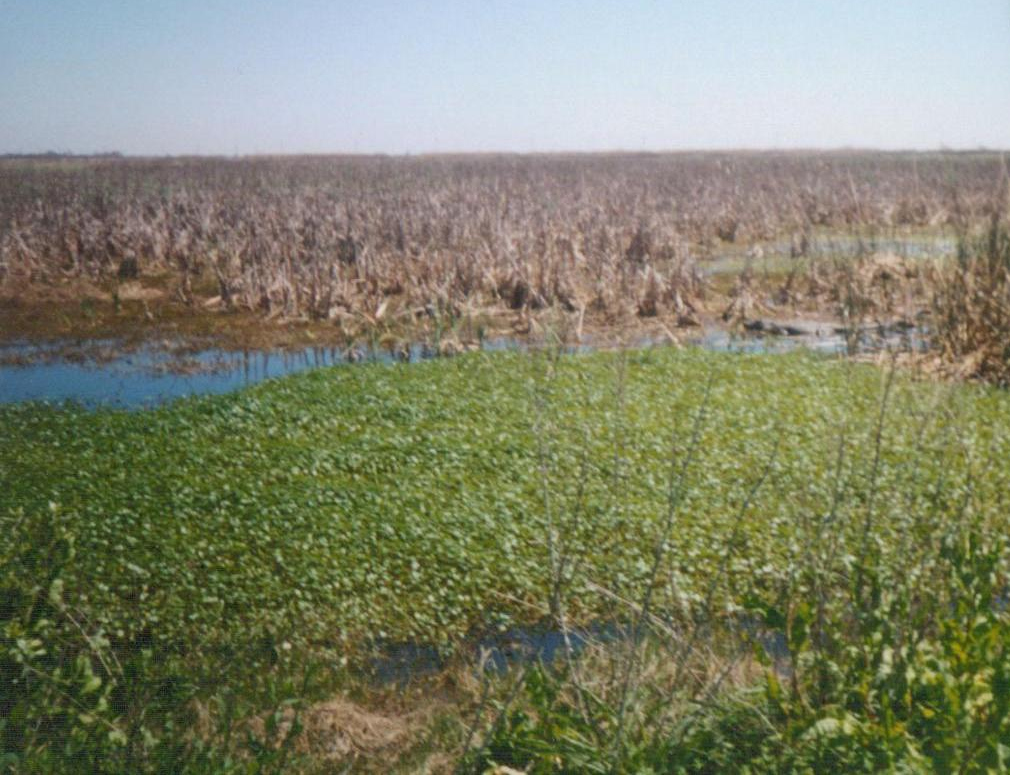

- Location within the United States
- Location: Cameron Parish, Louisiana
- Nearest city: Hackberry, Louisiana
- Coordinates: 29°54′N 93°32′W
- Area: 124,511 acres (503.88 km^{2})
- Established: 1937
- Visitors: open to public
- Governing body: U.S. Fish and Wildlife Service
- Website: Sabine National Wildlife Refuge

Sabine National Wildlife Refuge

Sabine National Wildlife Refuge is a National Wildlife Refuge of the United States located in Cameron Parish in southwestern Louisiana. It is on Louisiana Highway 27, 8 miles (13 km) south of Hackberry and 12 miles (19 km) north of Holly Beach. The western boundary of the Sabine Refuge is Sabine Lake, the inlet for Port Arthur, Texas, while the tip of the eastern end reaches Calcasieu Lake.

== Southwest Louisiana National Wildlife Refuge Complex ==
The Southwest Louisiana National Wildlife Refuge Complex was formed by administratively combining of the East Cove National Wildlife Refuge, Lacassine National Wildlife Refuge, Cameron Prairie National Wildlife Refuge, Shell Keys National Wildlife Refuge, and Sabine in 2004.

== Wildlife and habitat ==
Sabine is a 124,511-acre (504 km^{2}) sanctuary, the largest coastal marsh refuge on the Gulf Coast of the United States. It is home to more than 200 species of birds, including ducks, great egrets, geese, Neotropic cormorants, raptors, snowy egrets, wading birds, and shorebirds. There is also a very large contingent of American alligators, as well as blue crabs, American mink, muskrats, coypu, North American river otters, rabbits, shrimp, and turtles.

Other "Featured Species" (not complete listing)): Cooper's Hawk (Astur cooperii), Sharp-shinned Hawk (Accipiter striatus), Oppositeleaf Spotflower (Acmella oppositifolia), Oppositeleaf Spotflower (Acmella repens), Beach False Foxglove (Agalinis fasciculata), Red-winged Blackbird (Agelaius phoeniceus), Gulf Fritillary (Agraulis vanillae), Agrostis hyemalis (often mistaken for rough bentgrass (Agrostis scabra), Wood Duck (Aix sponsa), Skipjack Herring (Alosa chrysochloris), Alydus pilosulus( broad-headed bug), Cuman Ragweed (Ambrosia psilostachya), LeConte's sparrow (Ammodramus leconteii), Seaside Sparrow (Ammodramus maritimus), Nelson's Sharp-tailed Sparrow (Ammodramus nelsoni), Northern Pintail (Anas acuta), American Wigeon (Anas americana), Northern Shoveler (Anas clypeata), Eurasian teal (Anas crecca), Cinnamon teal (Anas cyanoptera), Blue-winged teal (Anas discors), Mottled duck (Anas fulvigula), Gadwall (Anas strepera), Striped anchovy (Anchoa hepsetus), Bay anchovy (Anchoa mitchilli), Anhinga (Anhinga anhinga), Green Anole (Anolis carolinensis), Greater white-fronted goose (Anser albifrons), Buff-bellied pipit (Anthus rubescens), chuck-will's-widow (Antrostomus carolinensis), Ruby-throated hummingbird (Archilochus colubris), Sheepshead (Archosargus probatocephalus), Great egret (Ardea alba), Great blue heron (Ardea herodias), Ruddy turnstone (Arenaria interpres), Hardhead catfish (Ariopsis felis), Great southern white (Ascia monuste), Green antelopehorn (Asclepias viridis), Short-eared owl (Asio flammeus), Burrowing owl (Athene cunicularia), Alligator gar (Atractosteus spatula), Lesser scaup (Aythya affinis), Redhead (Aythya americana), Ring-necked duck (Aythya collaris), Canvasback (Aythya valisineria), Gafftopsail catfish (Bagre marinus), Silver perch (Bairdiella chrysoura), Upland sandpiper (Bartramia longicauda), Sturdy bulrush (Bolboschoenus robustus), Mallard (Anas platyrhynchos), Roseate Spoonbill (Platalea ajaja), Red Drum (Sciaenops ocellatus), Cedar waxwing (Bombycilla cedrorum), American bittern (Botaurus lentiginosus), Canada Goose (Branta canadensis), Western pygmy blue (Brephidium exilis), Finescale Menhaden or small-scaled menhaden (Brevoortia gunteri), Gulf menhaden or large scale menhaden (Brevoortia patronus), Great horned owl (Bubo virginianus), Cattle egret (Bubulcus ibis), Bufflehead (Bucephala albeola), Common goldeneye (Bucephala clangula), Red-tailed hawk (Buteo jamaicensis), Red-shouldered hawk (Buteo lineatus), Broad-winged hawk (Buteo platypterus), Swainson's hawk (Buteo swainsoni), Green heron (Butorides virescens), Sanderling (Calidris alba), Dunlin (Calidris alpina), Red Knot (Calidris canutus), White-rumped sandpiper (Calidris fuscicollis), Stilt sandpiper (Calidris himantopus), Western sandpiper (Calidris mauri), Pectoral sandpiper (Calidris melanotos), Least sandpiper (Calidris minutilla), Semipalmated sandpiper (Calidris pusilla), Spotted Sandpiper (Actitis macularius), Coyote (Canis latrans), Gray wolf (Canis lupus), Upland sandpiper (Bartramia longicauda), Sturdy bulrush (Bolboschoenus robustus), and American bittern (Botaurus lentiginosus).

The Wetland Walkway, a 1.5-mile (2.4 km) nature trail made from concrete, a portion of which is a wooden boardwalk, located 4 miles (6.4 km) south of the refuge headquarters. It includes an observation tower and fifteen knowledge stations about Gulf Coast marshland. A second natural trail, the Blue Goose Trail is a 1-mile (1.6 km) round trip trail with a scenic overlook.

Petroleum exploration is allowed on the refuge. There was an oil spill at one of the well sites in Sabine during the winter of 2002–2003. Most of the spill was cleaned up by burning the oil.

== Hurricane damage ==
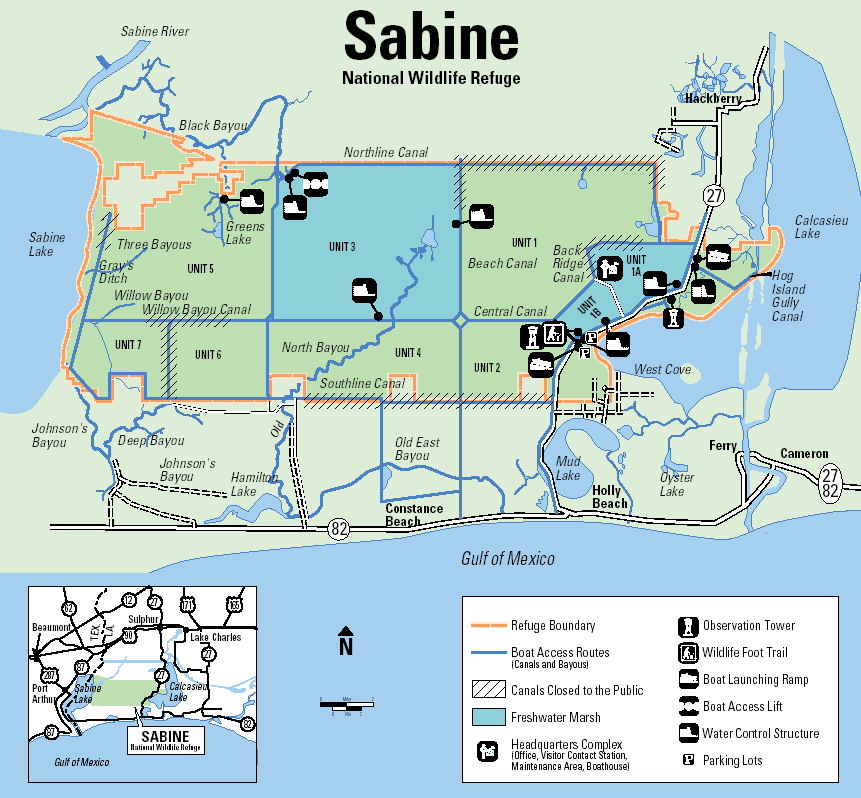
Sabine NWR map (U.S. Fish & Wildlife Service; click for a larger view).

Sabine National Wildlife Refuge was in the direct path of Hurricane Rita on September 24, 2005. All of the office buildings, visitor center, and maintenance shops were damaged beyond repair and have been removed. There are three remaining structures at the refuge headquarters area that were repaired. Recreational areas along Highway 27 received varying amounts of damage to bridges, piers, observation towers, boardwalks, restroom facilities, fences, and parking lots. Some of these facilities still require repairs and refuge staff are working with state and local partners, contractors, and other federal agencies to complete the work.

West of Highway 27, Sabine refuge canals and marshes were severely affected by storm wind and water. Approximately 32,000 acres (130 km^{2}) of refuge marshes, levees, and canals were damaged. Canals and marshes are clogged with seven million cubic meters of debris from offshore rigs and coastal communities. There are both physical and chemical hazards present throughout the refuge, many of which have settled below the marsh and water surfaces. Tanks and barrels containing hazardous liquids and gases have the potential to explode or break down and release toxins into the environment. Over 1,400 hazardous material containers have been identified and are estimated to contain between 115,000 and 350,000 gallons of hazardous liquids and gases.

The refuge opened for the 2020–2021 season for limited activities including fishing and hunting.

The entire complex that includes Cameron Prairie, Sabine, and Lacassine National Wildlife Refuges are scheduled to be open March 15, through Oct. 15, 2024.

== Stats ==
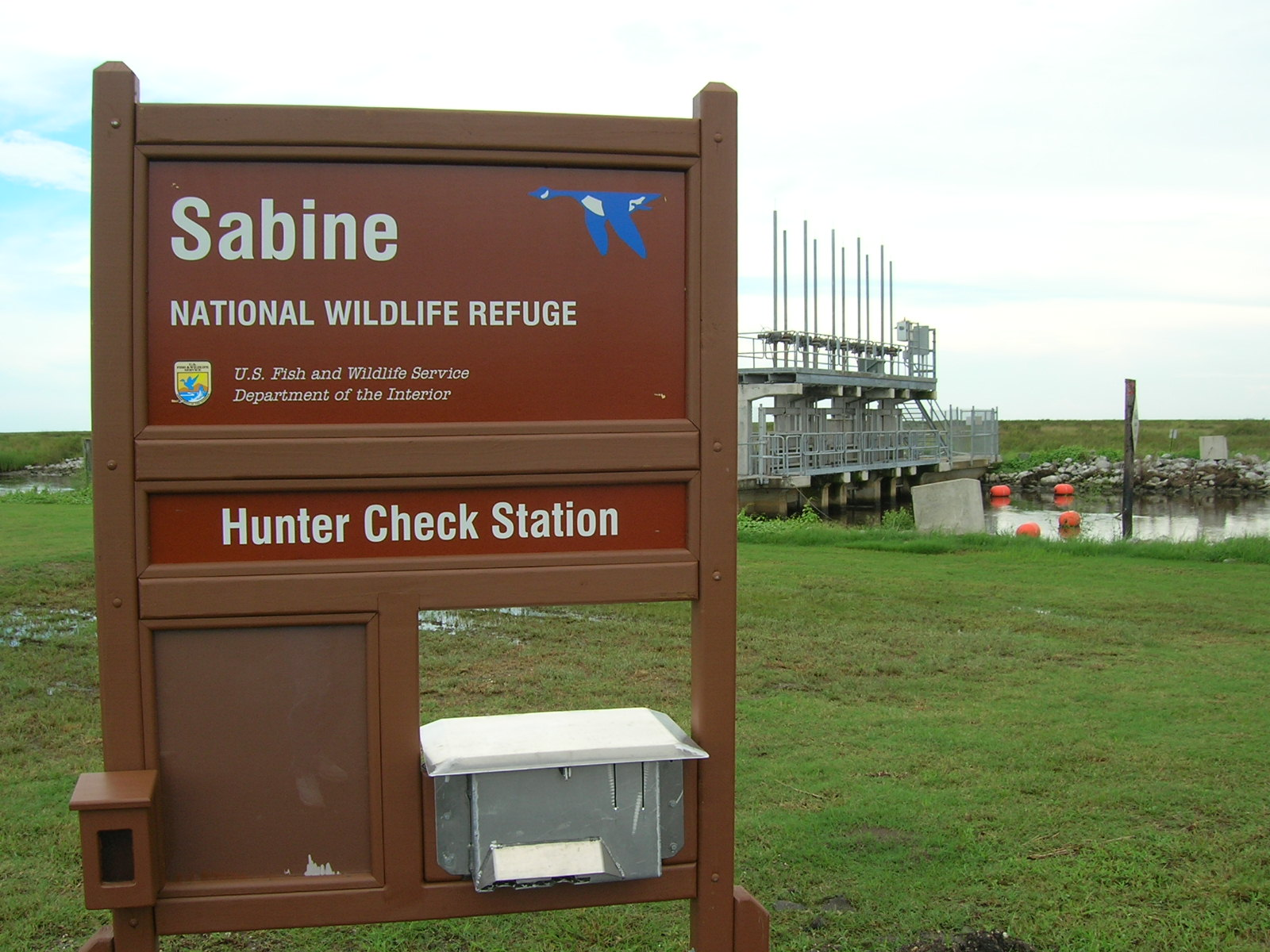
Sabine National Wildlife Refuge - Hunter Check Station

- Location: 29°54′N 93°32′W
- Elevation: 10 feet (3 m; avg)
- Area:
  - Water: 39,844 acres (161 km^{2})
  - Grassland/herbaceous/marsh: 84,667 acres (343 km^{2})
- Annual visitors: 300,000 (approximately)

== See also ==
- List of National Wildlife Refuges: Louisiana
