= Old River (Natchitoches Parish) =

River in Natchitoches Parish, Louisiana

- Old River
- Old River (Natchitoches Parish) Old River (Natchitoches Parish) (the United States)

Location
- Country: United States
- State: Louisiana
- Parish: Natchitoches

Physical characteristics
- Source: Bayou Brevelle, Kisatchie Bayou, Cane River
- Mouth
  - coordinates: 31°34′15″N 93°00′21″W
- Length: 25 miles (40 km)

Old River (Natchitoches Parish) is a series of interconnected, natural waterways totaling over 25 miles (40 km) in length in Natchitoches Parish, Louisiana. Its main channel runs along Louisiana Highway 1 from south of Natchitoches, Louisiana, to Colfax, Louisiana. The river is flanked by Interstate 49 on the west and the Red River of the South on the east, and is one of the many waterways on Isle Brevelle.

Like nearby Cane River and Bayou Brevelle, Old River was once the Red River.

== Historic churches ==
St. Anne Chapel at Old River is a historic Catholic chapel founded in the 1800s along the banks of Old River near the community of Cypress. It is the cultural and religious center of the area's Louisiana Creole people, predominantly of French descent. The church and cemetery are located on Old River Road (Parish Road 615) near Kisatchie Bayou.

Other historic churches along Old River include St. James, St. John's Catholic Church, St. Andrew Baptist Church and St. David Church.

== See also ==
- Fort St. Jean Baptiste State Historic Site
