= Kisatchie Bayou =

Stream in Natchitoches Parish, LA

- Kisatchie Bayou
- Kisatchie Bayou

Location
- Country: United States
- State: Louisiana
- Parish: Natchitoches

Physical characteristics
- Source: Old River (Natchitoches Parish), Bayou Brevelle
- Mouth
  - coordinates: 31°35′08″N 93°01′20″W
- Length: 38 miles (61 km)

Kisatchie Bayou is a series of interconnected, natural waterways totaling over 38 miles in length in Natchitoches Parish, Louisiana, and Sabine Parish, Louisiana. The bayou is a tributary of Old River at Isle Brevelle. The bayou runs through a large portion of Kisatchie National Forest, the only national forest in the State of Louisiana.

Kisatchie Falls, located on Kisatchie Bayou, is the only Class II rapids in Louisiana.

The Man in the Moon (1991 film) was filmed at Kisatchie Bayou. Several of the swimming scenes with actress Reese Witherspoon were filmed at the bayou and the falls.

== Name ==
The name Kisatchie is derived from a tribe of Kichai Indians of the Caddo Confederacy.

== See also ==
- Bayou Brevelle
- Cane River Lake
- St. Augustine Catholic Church and Cemetery (Natchez, Louisiana)
- Anne des Cadeaux
- Kisatchie National Forest
