= Cameron Prairie National Wildlife Refuge =

Wildlife refuge

- IUCN category IV (habitat/species management area)
- Location within the United States
- Location: Cameron Parish, Louisiana
- Nearest city: Lake Charles, Louisiana
- Coordinates: 29°51′00″N 93°13′00″W
- Area: 9,621 acres (3,893 ha)
- Established: 1986
- Governing body: U.S. Fish and Wildlife Service
- Website: Cameron Prairie National Wildlife Refuge

Cameron Prairie National Wildlife Refuge

Cameron Prairie National Wildlife Refuge is located approximately 25 miles (40 km) southeast of Lake Charles, Louisiana, in north central Cameron Parish. It contains 9,621 acres (3,893 ha) that include fresh marsh, coastal prairie, and old rice fields.

The visitor center opened in 1994 and is located south of Lake Charles on Louisiana Highway 27, 11 miles south of Holmwood, Louisiana. The center's exhibits focus on the birds and other wildlife found in the refuge, and the plant and animal life and different types of ecosystems. An animated exhibit features a Cajun resident named Tante Marie, who sits in a pirogue and talks about life in the refuge. The visitor center suffered damage from Hurricane Rita, and reopened with new exhibits in the fall of 2009.

== Southwest Louisiana National Wildlife Refuge Complex ==
In 2004, the Southwest Louisiana National Wildlife Refuge Complex was formed by administratively combining the Cameron Prairie National Wildlife Refuge, Sabine National Wildlife Refuge, Shell Keys National Wildlife Refuge, and the Lacassine National Wildlife Refuge with headquarters at Cameron Prairie.

== See also ==
- List of National Wildlife Refuges: Louisiana
