= East Cove National Wildlife Refuge =

National Wildlife Refuge in Louisiana

- IUCN category IV (habitat/species management area)
- Location within the United States
- Location: Cameron Parish, Louisiana
- Nearest city: Lake Charles, Louisiana
- Coordinates: 29°50′51″N 93°14′00″W
- Area: 14,927 acres (60.41 km^{2})
- Established: 1937
- Governing body: U.S. Fish and Wildlife Service
- Website: East Cove National Wildlife Refuge

East Cove National Wildlife Refuge is located south of Lake Charles, Louisiana along the southeast shore of Calcasieu Lake in Cameron Parish. It is accessible only by boat.

It is managed by the Cameron Prairie National Wildlife Refuge office as part of the Southwest Louisiana National Wildlife Refuge Complex.

== Wildlife and habitat ==
The habitat is an estuarine marsh in the heart of the Cameron Creole Watershed.

Nineteen miles of lake shore levee and five water control structures are used to control water and salinity levels in this wetland.

Abundant fishery resources such as fish, shrimp, and crabs as well as migratory birds and alligators are found in the area.

== See also ==
- List of National Wildlife Refuges: Louisiana
