= African diaspora in the Americas =

People born in the Americas with sub-Saharan African ancestry

Afroamericanos, Amerafricans
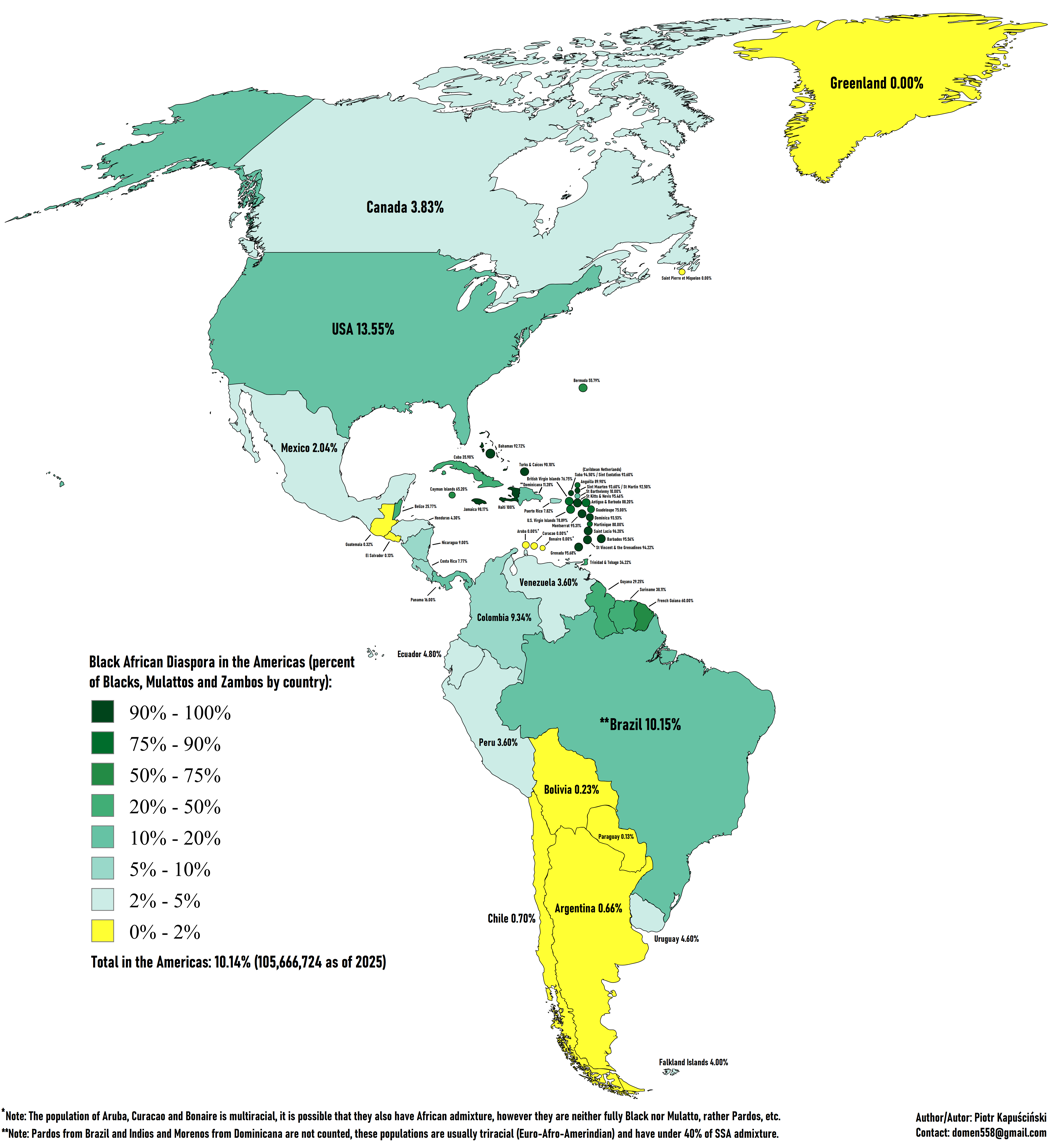
- Sub-Saharan African diaspora in the Americas (including Blacks, Mulattos and Zambos) by country

Total population
- c. 92,000,000

Regions with significant populations
- United States: 46,936,733
- Brazil: 20,656,458
- Haiti: 10,896,000
- Colombia: 4,944,400
- Mexico: 2,576,213
- Jamaica: 2,531,000
- Dominican Republic: 1,704,000
- Panama: 1,258,915
- Canada: 1,198,540
- Cuba: 1,034,044
- Venezuela: 936,770
- Peru: 828,824
- Ecuador: 814,468
- Puerto Rico: 574,287
- Nicaragua: 572,000
- Trinidad and Tobago: 452,536
- Bahamas: 324,000
- Barbados: 280,000
- Martinique: 273,985
- Uruguay: 371,000
- Guyana: 227,062
- Suriname: 202,500
- Honduras: 191,000
- Argentina: 149,493
- Saint Lucia: 142,000
- Belize: 108,000

Languages
- English, Portuguese, Spanish, French, Dutch, and various Creole and mixed languages, incl. Haitian Creole, Antillean Creole, Papiamento, etc.

Religion
- Christianity, Rastafari, Afro-American religions, Traditional African religions, Islam, others

Related ethnic groups
- African diaspora, Maroons

The African diaspora in the Americas (Spanish: Afroamericanos) refers to the people born in the Americas with partial, predominant, or complete sub-Saharan African ancestry. Many are descendants of persons enslaved in Africa and transferred to the Americas by Europeans, and whose ethnogenesis occurred in the Americas and were forced to work mostly in European-owned mines and plantations, between the sixteenth and nineteenth centuries. Significant groups have been established in the United States (African Americans), in Canada (Black Canadians), in the Caribbean (Afro-Caribbean), and in Latin America (Afro-Latin Americans).

== History ==
After the United States achieved independence, next came the independence of Haiti, a country populated almost entirely by people of African descent and the second American colony to win its independence from European colonial powers. After the process of independence, many countries have encouraged European immigration to America, thus reducing the proportion of black and mulatto population throughout the country: Brazil, the United States, and the Dominican Republic. Miscegenation and more flexible concepts of race have also reduced the overall population identifying as black in Latin America, whereas the one-drop rule in the United States has had the opposite effect.

From 21 to 25 November 1995, the Continental Congress of Black Peoples of the Americas was held. Black people still face discrimination in most parts of the continent. According to David D.E. Ferrari, vice president of the World Bank for the Region of Latin America and the Caribbean, black people have lower life expectancy, higher infant mortality, more frequent and more widespread diseases, higher rates of illiteracy and lower income than Americans of different ethnic origin. Women, also the subjects of gender discrimination, suffer worse living conditions.

On 4 November 2008, the first black U.S. president, Barack Obama, won 52% of the vote. His father was from Kenya and his mother was from Kansas.

== Distribution ==
=== Black population by country ===
Country	% Black African	% Mixed Black African
Haiti	95%	~5%
Saint Kitts and Nevis	92.5%	3%
Barbados	92.4%	3.1%
Martinique	92.4%	
Jamaica	92.1%	6.1%
Curaçao	91.8%	
The Bahamas	90.6%	2.1%
(Turks and Caicos Islands) Turks and Caicos	87.6%	2.5%
Antigua and Barbuda	87.3%	4.7%
Montserrat	86.2%	4.8%
Saint Lucia	85.3%	10.9%
Anguilla	85.3%	3.8%
Dominica	84.7%	9%
Grenada	82.4%	13.3%
British Virgin Islands	76.3%	5.4%
(United States Virgin Islands) U.S. Virgin Islands	76%	2.1%
(Saint Vincent and the Grenadines) Vincent and the Grenadines	71.2%	23%
French Guiana	66%	
Bermuda	52%	9%
Suriname	37.4%	
Guyana	30.2%	16.7%
Trinidad and Tobago	34.2%	22.8%
Panama	32.8%	
Belize	25.6%	6.1%
Cayman Islands	20%	40%
Dominican Republic	15.8%	70.4%
Aruba	15%	
United States	12.4%	1.8%
Brazil	10.2%	45.3%
Guadeloupe	10%	76.7%
Cuba	9.3%	26.6%
Colombia	9.34%	15.44%
Nicaragua	9%	
Puerto Rico	7%	10.5%
Ecuador	4.8%	
Uruguay	6.9%	3.7%
Canada	4.26%	
Venezuela	3.6%	51.6%
Peru	6.04%	
Mexico	2.04%	
Honduras	2%	
Costa Rica	1.1%	6.7%
Argentina	0.7%	
Guatemala	0.3%	
Bolivia	0.2%	
El Salvador	0.13%	
Paraguay	0.13%	
Chile	0.9%	

=== Black population by region according to the censuses ===
Region	Percentage	Total population	Country	Year
Between 50% and 100%
Chocó	73.83%	337,696	Colombia	2018
San Andrés y Providencia	55.64%	26,873	Colombia	2018
Between 25% and 50%
District of Columbia	41.45%	285,810	USA	2020
Mississippi	36.62%	1,084,481	USA	2020
Louisiana	31.43%	1,464,023	USA	2020
(Georgia (U.S. state)) Georgia	31.00%	3,320,513	USA	2020
Maryland	29.47%	1,820,472	USA	2020
Alabama	25.80%	1,296,162	USA	2020
South Carolina	25.02%	1,280,531	USA	2020
Between 10% and 25%
Bahia	22.38%	3,164,691	Brazil	2022
Delaware	22.11%	218,899	USA	2020
North Carolina	20.50%	2,140,217	USA	2020
Cauca	19.74%	245,362	Colombia	2018
Virginia	18.62%	1,607,581	USA	2020
Nariño	17.45%	233,062	Colombia	2018
Valle del Cauca	17.09%	647,526	Colombia	2018
Bolívar	16.73%	319,396	Colombia	2018
Rio de Janeiro	16.16%	2,594,253	Brazil	2022
Tennessee	15.81%	1,092,948	USA	2020
Florida	15.07%	3,246,381	USA	2020
Arkansas	15.07%	453,783	USA	2020
New York	14.78%	2,986,172	USA	2020
Illinois	14.11%	1,808,271	USA	2020
Michigan	13.66%	1,376,579	USA	2020
Tocantins	13.19%	199,394	Brazil	2022
New Jersey	13.13%	1,219,770	USA	2020
Cesar	12.97%	142,436	Colombia	2018
Sergipe	12.85%	283,960	Brazil	2022
Maranhão	12.61%	854,424	Brazil	2022
Ohio	12.53%	1,478,781	USA	2020
Piauí	12.25%	400,662	Brazil	2022
Texas	12.19%	3,552,997	USA	2020
Sucre	11.91%	102,836	Colombia	2018
Minas Gerais	11.84%	2,432,877	Brazil	2022
Amapá	11.81%	86,662	Brazil	2022
Missouri	11.37%	699,840	USA	2020
Espírito Santo	11.21%	429,680	Brazil	2022
Pennsylvania	10.95%	1,423,169	USA	2020
Connecticut	10.78%	388,675	USA	2020
(Federal District (Brazil)) Federal District	10.71%	301,765	Brazil	2022
Pernambuco	10.04%	909,557	Brazil	2022
Between 5% and 10%
Mato Grosso	9.86%	360,698	Brazil	2022
Nevada	9.82%	304,739	USA	2020
Pará	9.77%	793,621	Brazil	2022
Indiana	9.56%	648,513	USA	2020
Alagoas	9.55%	298,709	Brazil	2022
Goiás	9.19%	648,560	Brazil	2022
Rio Grande do Norte	9.17%	302,749	Brazil	2022
Rondônia	8.65%	136,793	Brazil	2022
Acre	8.56%	71,086	Brazil	2022
Magdalena	8.42%	106,318	Colombia	2018
Kentucky	8.04%	362,417	USA	2020
São Paulo	7.99%	3,546,562	Brazil	2022
Paraíba	7.96%	316,572	Brazil	2022
Roraima	7.73%	49,195	Brazil	2022
Oklahoma	7.32%	289,961	USA	2020
La Guajira	7.32%	60,475	Colombia	2018
Massachusetts	7.03%	494,029	USA	2020
Minnesota	6.98%	398,434	USA	2020
Ceará	6.77%	595,694	Brazil	2022
Córdoba	6.58%	102,495	Colombia	2018
Rio Grande do Sul	6.52%	709,837	Brazil	2022
Mato Grosso do Sul	6.50%	179,101	Brazil	2022
Wisconsin	6.39%	376,356	USA	2020
Atlántico	5.99%	140,142	Colombia	2018
Kansas	5.75%	168,809	USA	2020
Rhode Island	5.67%	62,168	USA	2020
California	5.66%	2,237,044	USA	2020
Antioquia	5.22%	312,112	Colombia	2018
Between 0% and 5%
Amazonas	4.91%	193,667	Brazil	2022
Nebraska	4.92%	96,535	USA	2020
Arizona	4.74%	339,150	USA	2020
Paraná	4.24%	485,781	Brazil	2022
Arauca	4.20%	10,058	Colombia	2018
Iowa	4.14%	131,972	USA	2020
Guaviare	4.10%	2,991	Colombia	2018
Colorado	4.07%	234,828	USA	2020
Santa Catarina	4.07%	309,908	Brazil	2022
Washington	3.99%	307,565	USA	2020
West Virginia	3.67%	65,813	USA	2020
Putumayo	3.62%	10,262	Colombia	2018
North Dakota	3.44%	26,783	USA	2020
Alaska	2.99%	21,898	USA	2020
New Mexico	2.17%	45,904	USA	2020
South Dakota	2.01%	17,842	USA	2020
Risaralda	1.99%	16,733	Colombia	2018
Oregon	1.95%	82,655	USA	2020
Maine	1.87%	25,752	USA	2020
Hawaii	1.61%	23,417	USA	2020
Casanare	1.61%	6,130	Colombia	2018
Caldas	1.59%	14,716	Colombia	2018
New Hampshire	1.46%	20,127	USA	2020
Caquetá	1.41%	5,087	Colombia	2018
Vermont	1.40%	9,034	USA	2020
Buenos Aires City	1.31%	40,670	Argentina	2022
Utah	1.22%	40,058	USA	2020
Quindío	1.18%	6,060	Colombia	2018
Santander	1.13%	22,759	Colombia	2018
Guainía	1.04%	460	Colombia	2018
Meta	0.96%	8,836	Colombia	2018
Wyoming	0.92%	5,232	USA	2020
Bogotá	0.92%	66,934	Colombia	2018
Chubut	0.90%	5,302	Argentina	2020
Tierra del Fuego	0.90%	1,658	Argentina	2022
Idaho	0.86%	15,726	USA	2020
Vaupés	0.77%	288	Colombia	2018
Vichada	0.76%	580	Colombia	2018
Salta	0.74%	10,632	Argentina	2022
Amazonas	0.74%	486	Colombia	2018
(Buenos Aires Province) Buenos Aires	0.74%	128,804	Argentina	2022
Misiones	0.74%	9,374	Argentina	2022
(Río Negro Province) Río Negro	0.73%	5,463	Argentina	2022
Santa Cruz	0.73%	2,446	Argentina	2022
Neuquén	0.71%	5,026	Argentina	2022
Jujuy	0.69%	5,583	Argentina	2022
Entre Ríos	0.63%	8,910	Argentina	2022
Corrientes	0.52%	6,310	Argentina	2022
La Rioja	0.51%	1,959	Argentina	2022
Montana	0.51%	5,484	USA	2020
Huila	0.50%	5,099	Colombia	2018
Formosa	0.49%	2,956	Argentina	2022
Córdoba	0.48%	18,366	Argentina	2022
La Pampa	0.48%	1,726	Argentina	2022
Chaco	0.48%	5,357	Argentina	2022
Cundinamarca	0.47%	13,092	Colombia	2018
Santa Fe	0.47%	16,560	Argentina	2022
Catamarca	0.46%	1,965	Argentina	2022
Tucumán	0.42%	7,172	Argentina	2022
Tolima	0.42%	5,207	Colombia	2018
Norte de Santander	0.40%	5,470	Colombia	2018
Mendoza	0.40%	8,141	Argentina	2022
Santiago del Estero	0.40%	4,211	Argentina	2022
Boyacá	0.38%	4,247	Colombia	2018
La Paz	0.38%	11,590	Bolivia	2012
San Luis	0.35%	1,896	Argentina	2022
San Juan	0.30%	2,449	Argentina	2022
Pando	0.23%	312	Bolivia	2024
Santa Cruz	0.21%	6,490	Bolivia	2024
Beni	0.20%	973	Bolivia	2024
Cochabamba	0.16%	3,127	Bolivia	2024
Tarija	0.13%	671	Bolivia	2024
Chuquisaca	0.11%	694	Bolivia	2024
Potosí	0.10%	857	Bolivia	2024
Oruro	0.08%	454	Bolivia	2024
Source: Censuses of American countries.

== Languages ==
Dialects are linguistic varieties that may differ in pronunciation, vocabulary, spelling, and other aspects of grammar. The African diaspora in the Americas has been subject to various colonial languages. A list of languages spoken by or developed in the Amer-Afro diaspora is provided below.

=== Varieties of colonial and national languages ===
- American English
- American French: Louisiana
- Brazilian Portuguese
  - Nordeste: Nordestino, Costa Norte, Recifence, Bainao
  - Sudeste: Caipira, Mineiro
  - Fluminense / Carioca^{pt}
- Caribbean English
  - Antiguan and Barbudan English
  - Bahamian English
  - Bajan English
  - Belizean English
  - Bermudian English
  - Cayman Islands English
  - Jamaican English
  - Trinidad and Tobago English
  - Saban English
  - San Nicolaas English
  - Puerto Rican English
- Caribbean French
  - Saint-Barthélemy French or Patois Saint-Barth
  - Haitian French or Haitian Creole
  - Martinican French or Martinican Creole
- Caribbean Spanish
  - Puerto Rican Spanish
  - Dominican Spanish
  - Venezuelan Spanish
  - Panamanian Spanish
  - Cuban Spanish
- Central American Spanish
  - Honduran Spanish
  - Nicaraguan Spanish
- Colombian Spanish: Sabanero, Antioqueño, Chocoano, Vallecaucan, Tumaqueño, Nariñese
- Mexican Spanish: Costeño
- Rioplatense Spanish
- Venezuelan Spanish: Caraqueño, el Guaro, el Caroreño, Margariteño

=== Maroon languages, creoles, and ethno-cultural dialects ===
==== Arawakan ====
- Garifuna
- Tainonaíki

==== Portuguese-based ====
- Cafundó
- Papiamento
- Manhattan Creole Portuguese

==== Spanish-based ====
- Bozal Spanish ^{†}
- Palenquero

==== Dutch-based ====
- Berbice Creole Dutch ^{†}
- Skepi Creole Dutch ^{†}
- Black Dutch or Negerduits ^{†}
- Negerhollands ^{†}

==== Caribbean Creole French ====
- Haitian Creole or Kreyòl
- Louisiana Creole or Kouri-Vini
- Mon Louis Island Creole
- French Guianese Creole or Kréyòl
- Antillean Creole or Kreyol / Patois
  - Guadeloupean Creole
    - Martinican Creole ^{fr}
    - Marie-Galante Creole
    - Les Saintes Creole
  - Saint Lucian Creole^{fr}
    - Dominican Creole French
    - Trinidadian Creole French ^{fr}
    - Grenadian Creole French or Kéyòl-la-gwinad, Patwa LaGwinad
    - Venezuelean Creole French
  - Saint-Barthélemy Creole
  - San Miguel Creole or Panamanian Patua

==== Atlantic Creole English ====
===== North America =====
- Afro-American Language continuum
  - African Nova Scotian English or Africadian
  - African-American Outer Banks English or Afro-Outer Banks
  - African-American Appalachian English or Affrilachian
  - Black Vernacular English or Ebonics
    - Baltimorese or Bawlmerese
    - Black Texas English
    - Jazz Jargon or Harlem Jive
    - Samaná Peninsula English
  - Sea Island Creole or Gullah
    - Afro-Seminole Creole

===== Eastern =====
- Vincentian Creole
- Northeastern:
  - Bahamian Creole
- Southeastern:
  - Antiguan and Barbudan Creole or Raabak
    - Saint Kitts Creole
    - Montserrat Creole
    - Anguillian Creole or Anguilla Talk
    - Kokoy
    - North Antiguan Creole or Nawt'n dialek
    - South Antiguan Creole or Sout'n dialek
    - Barbudan Creole or Baabyuudan dialek
  - Bajan Creole
  - Tobagonian Creole
  - Trinidadian Creole
  - Guyanese Creole or Creolese
  - Virgin Islands Creole
  - Grenadian Creole English or Patois

===== Western =====
- Jamaican Patois or Jamiekan Kriyuol / Taak
  - Bermudian Creole
  - Bocas del Toro Creole or Panamanian Patois
  - Limonese Creole or Mekatelyu
  - Miskito Coast Creole
    - Rama Cay Creole
- Turks and Caicos Creole
- San Andrés–Providencia Creole or Bende
  - Providence Creole English
  - Saintandrewan
- Belizean Creole or Belize Kriol

===== Surinamese =====
- Kwinti
- Maroon Spirit language or Kromanti, Deep Patwa
- Ndyuka
  - Aluku
- Nengue Tongo
- Paramaccan
- Saramaccan
- Sranan Tongo

===== Central American =====
- Bay Islands English

===== Southern Caribbean =====
- Venezuelan Creole English

=== Liturgical ===
- Habla Congo
- Haitian Vodoun Culture Language or Langay
- Iyaric or Rasta Talk
- Lucumí language
- Nuwaubian

=== Manual ===
- Black American Sign Language
- Jamaican Country Sign Language
- Jamaican Sign Language
- Kajana Sign Language

== Notable people of African descent in the Americas ==
- Kareem Abdul-Jabbar – American basketball player
- Muhammad Ali – American boxer
- Archie Alleyne – Canadian musician
- Deandre Ayton – Bahamian basketball player
- Ronald Acuna Jr. – Venezuelan baseball player
- Ozzie Albies – Curaçaoan baseball player
- Laz Alonso – Cuban actor
- Edem Awumey – Canadian writer
- Susana Baca – Peruvian musician
- Leandro Barbosa – Brazilian basketball player
- Charles Barkley – American basketball player
- RJ Barrett – Canadian basketball player
- Abelardo Barroso – Cuban singer
- Mario Bazán – Peruvian athlete
- DaMarcus Beasley – American football player
- Jean Beausejour – Chilean football player
- Adrián Beltré – Dominican baseball player
- Halle Berry – American actress
- Beyoncé – American singer
- Usain Bolt – Jamaican sprinter
- Cory Booker – American politician
- E. R. Braithwaite – Guyanese writer, educator and diplomat
- Melvin Brown – Mexican football player
- Rudel Calero – Nicaraguan football player
- Mariah Carey – American singer
- Sueli Carneiro – Brazilian philosopher and political activist
- Ramiro Castillo – Bolivian football player
- Aimé Césaire – Martinican author, philosopher and politician
- Bill Cosby – American actor and comedian
- Celia Cruz – Cuban singer
- Teófilo Cubillas – Peruvian football player
- Stephen Curry – American basketball player
- Léon Damas – French Guianese writer
- Edwidge Danticat – Haitian-American author
- Charlie Davies – American football player
- Oscar D'León – Venezuelan musician
- Drake – Canadian rapper
- Tim Duncan – American basketball player
- Kevin Durant – American basketball player
- Giovanny Espinoza – Ecuadorian football player
- Patrick Ewing – Jamaican basketball player
- Frantz Fanon – Martinican philosopher and Pan-Africanist
- Jefferson Farfán – Peruvian football player
- Marielle Franco – Brazilian politician
- Marcus Garvey – Jamaican Pan-Africanist
- Gilberto Gil – Brazilian musician and politician
- Juan José Nieto Gil – Colombian president
- Edray H. Goins – African American president of the National Association of Mathematicians (NAM)
- Eddy Grant – Guyanese pop and reggae music star
- Kevin Hanchard – Canadian actor
- Devern Hansack – Nicaraguan baseball pitcher
- James Harden – American basketball player
- Kamala Harris – American politician, Vice President of the United States
- Wilson Harris – Guyanese writer
- Buddy Hield – Bahamian basketball player
- Whitney Houston – American singer
- Kyrie Irving – American basketball player
- Michael Jackson – American singer
- Janet Jackson – American singer
- Lamar Jackson – American football player
- C. L. R. James – Trinidadian historian and academic
- LeBron James – American basketball player
- Wyclef Jean – Haitian musician
- Jerry Jeudy, American football player
- Dwayne Johnson – American actor and wrestler
- Magic Johnson – American basketball player
- Michael Jordan – American basketball player
- Colin Kaepernick – American civil rights activist and American football player
- Martin Luther King Jr. – American civil rights activist
- Hayden Knight – American football player
- Don Lemon – American journalist
- Mia Love – American politician
- Malcolm X – American human rights activist
- Bob Marley – Jamaican reggae musician
- Jackson Martínez – Colombian football player
- Margareth Menezes – Brazilian singer and producer
- Nicki Minaj – Trinidadian rapper
- Totó la Momposina – Colombian singer
- Zezé Motta – Brazilian actress
- Morella Muñoz – Venezuelan singer
- Milton Nascimento – Brazilian singer
- Anthony Nesty – Surinamese swimmer
- Lupita Nyong'o – Mexican actress
- Barack Obama – American politician, first black president of the United States
- Michelle Obama – American politician, former First Lady of the United States
- Shaquille O'Neal – American basketball player
- David Ortiz – Dominican baseball player
- Deval Patrick – American politician
- Chris Paul – American basketball player
- Pelé – Brazilian soccer player
- Carlos Posadas – Argentine musician
- Álex Quiñónez – Ecuadorian Olympic sprinter
- Rubén Rada – Uruguayan singer
- Lionel Richie – American singer
- Rihanna – Barbadian singer
- Robinho – Brazilian football player
- Walter Rodney – Guyanese historian and political activist
- Arturo Rodríguez – Argentine boxer
- Bill Russell – American basketball player
- Carlos Andrés Sánchez – Uruguayan football player
- Pablo Sandoval – Venezuelan athlete
- Giovani dos Santos – Mexican football player
- Milton Santos – Brazilian geographer
- Tupac Shakur – American rapper
- Cayetano Alberto Silva – Uruguayan musician
- Will Smith – American actor and singer
- Domingo Sosa – Argentine soldier
- Sloane Stephens – American tennis player
- Mike Tyson – American boxer
- María Isabel Urrutia – Colombian athlete
- Bebo Valdés – Cuban pianist
- Elcina Valencia – Colombian teacher
- Dwyane Wade – American basketball player
- Derek Walcott – Saint Lucian poet, playwright and the 1992 Nobel Prize Literature Winner
- Denzel Washington – American actor
- The Weeknd – Canadian singer
- Kanye West – American rapper and singer
- Russell Westbrook – American basketball player
- Andrew Wiggins – Canadian basketball player
- Eric Eustace Williams – Trinidad and Tobago's first Prime Minister
- Serena Williams – American tennis player
- Zion Williamson – American basketball player
- Russell Wilson – American football player
- Oprah Winfrey – American talk show host, actress and producer
- Tiger Woods – American golfer

== See also ==
- African-American
- African-Canadian
- African-Caribbean
- Afro-Latin American
- African diaspora religions

== Related bibliography ==
- Ethnic domination and racist discourse in Spain and Latin America. Dijk, Teun A. van. van. Gedisa Editorial SA ISBN 84-7432-997-3
- Gender, class and race in Latin America: some contributions. Luna, Lola G. Ed PPU, SA ISBN 84-7665-959-8
- Gender, race and class "color" desensientes Latinas. Impoexports, Colombia, Yumbo
- Afro Atlantic Histories resource, National Gallery of Art, Washington DC.
