= Elcina =

Elcina or ELCINA may refer to:

== People ==
- Elcina Valencia, a Colombian teacher and poet working in the Spanish language

== Organizations ==
- Electronic Industries Association of India (ELCINA), an Indian organization
