= 2018 census =

2018 census may refer to:

- 2018 Alberta municipal censuses
- 2018 Colombian census
- 2018 census of Malawi
- 2018 New Zealand census
