= Santa Marta =

- District and city
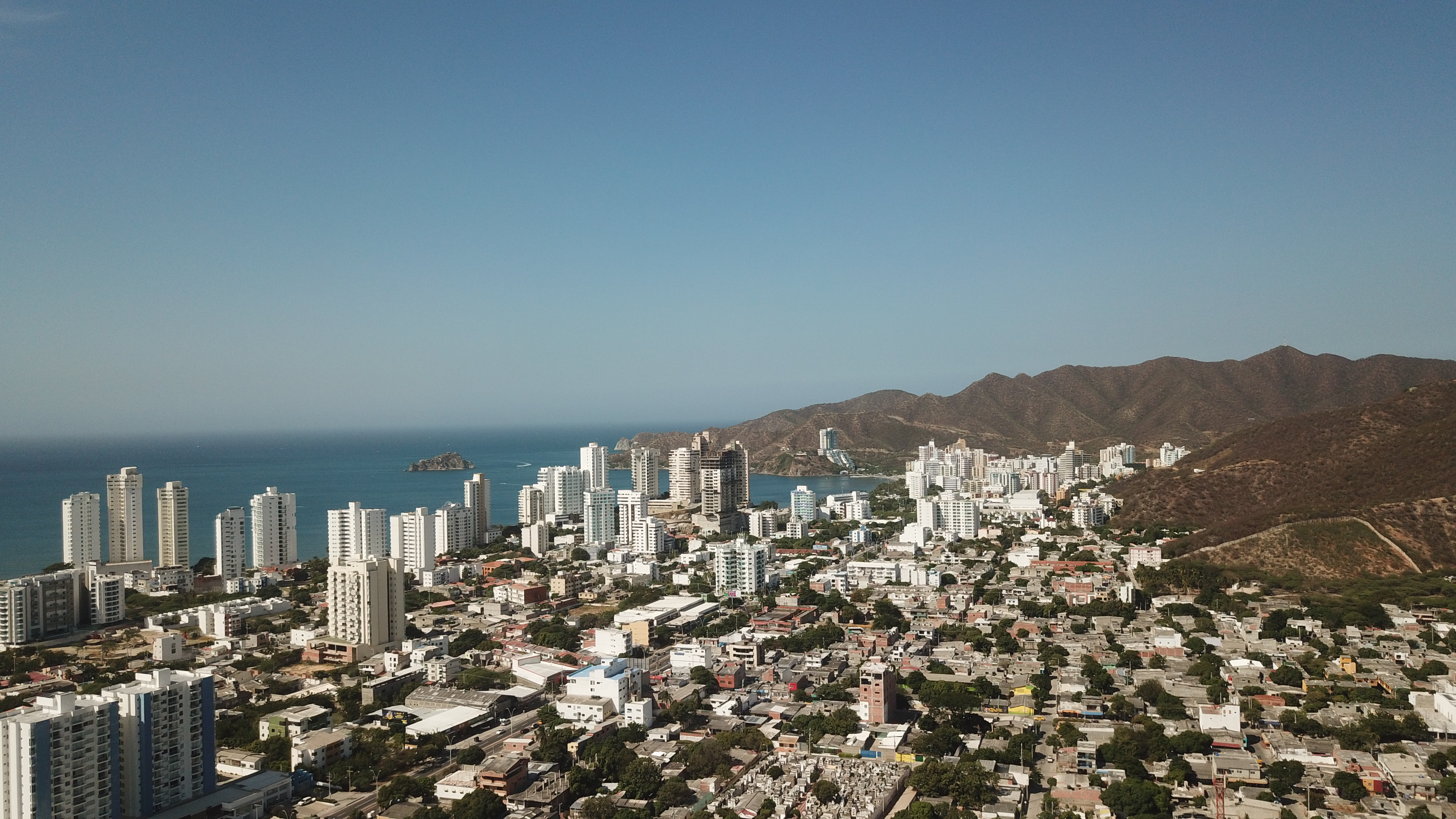
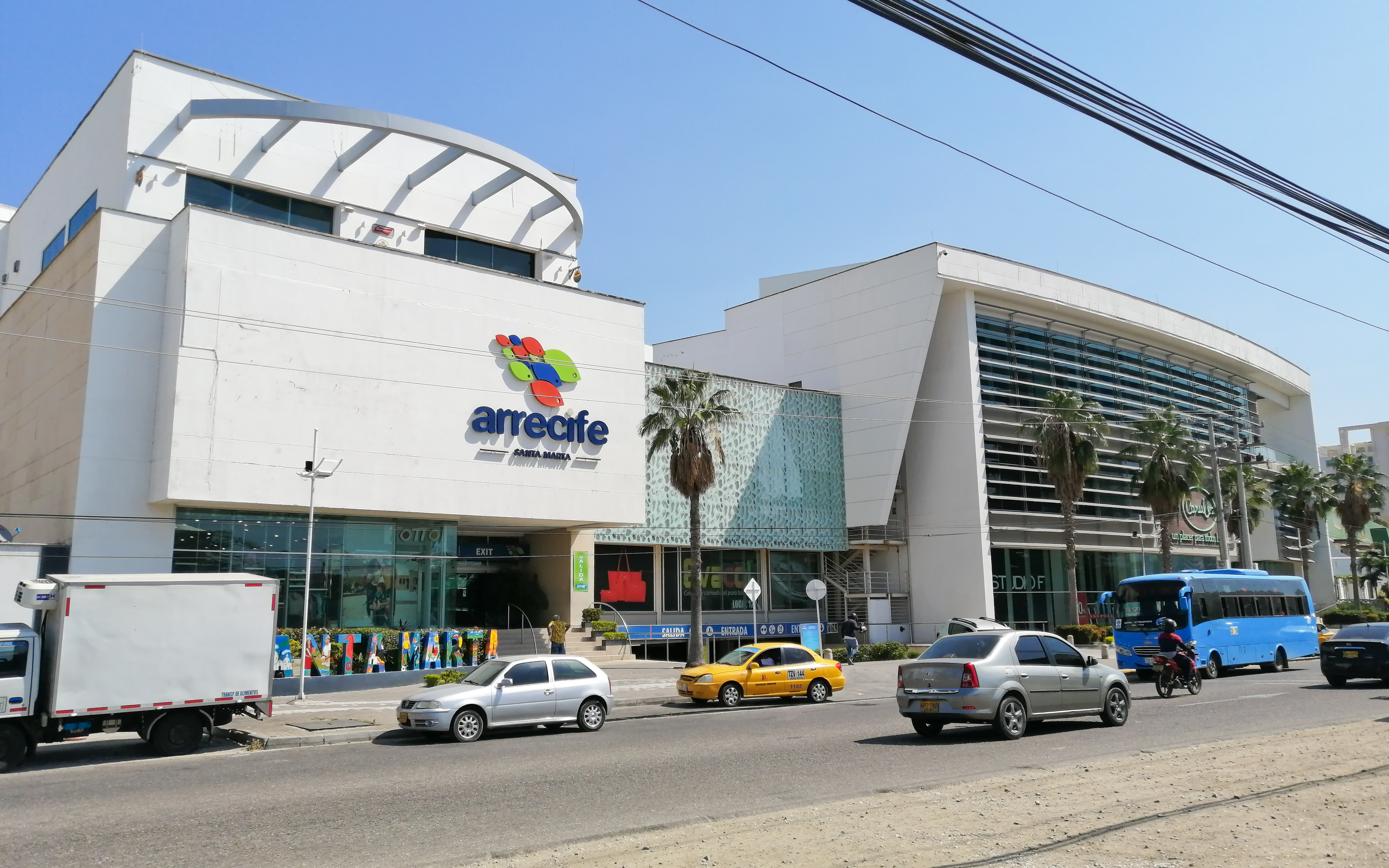
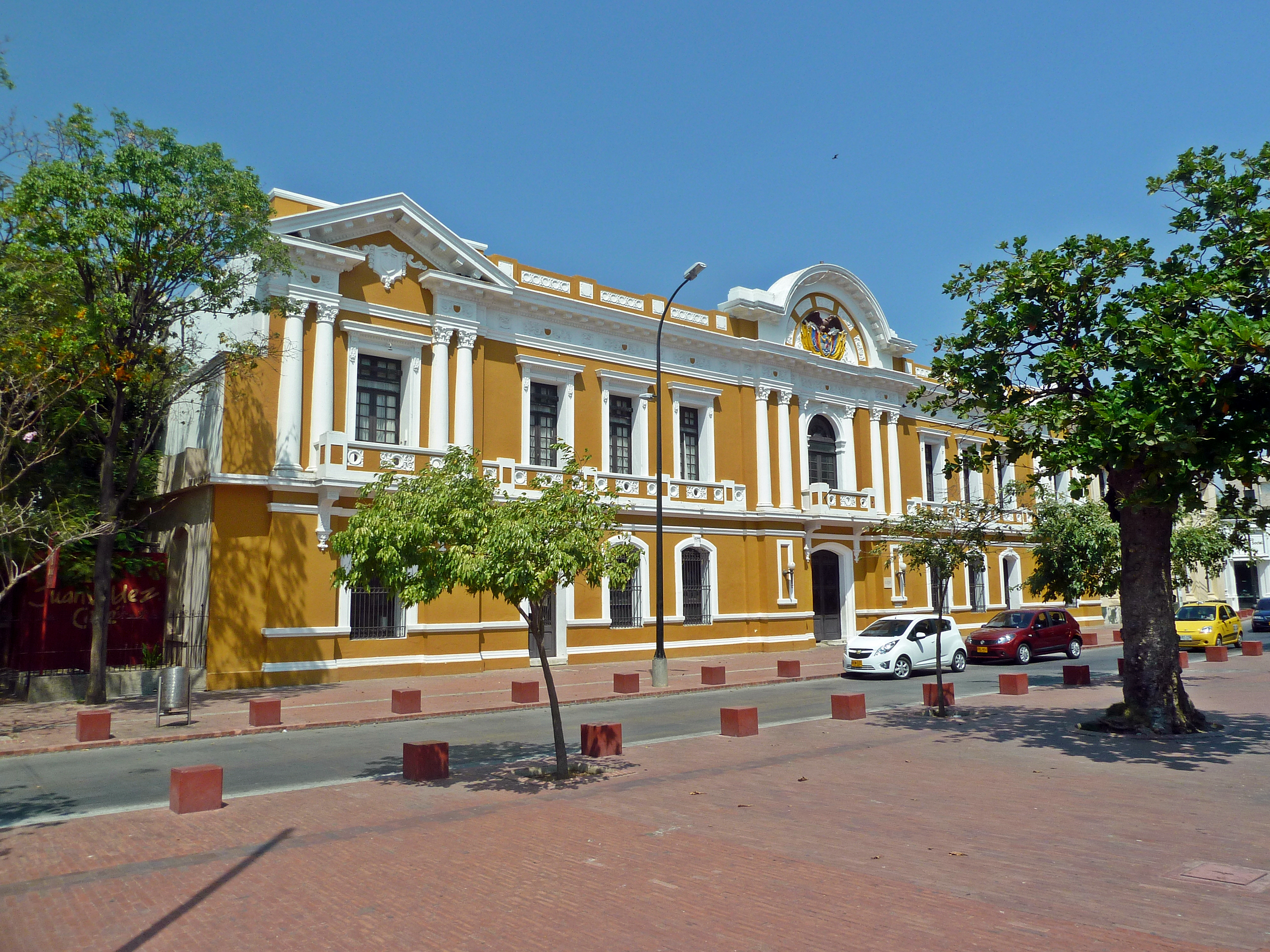
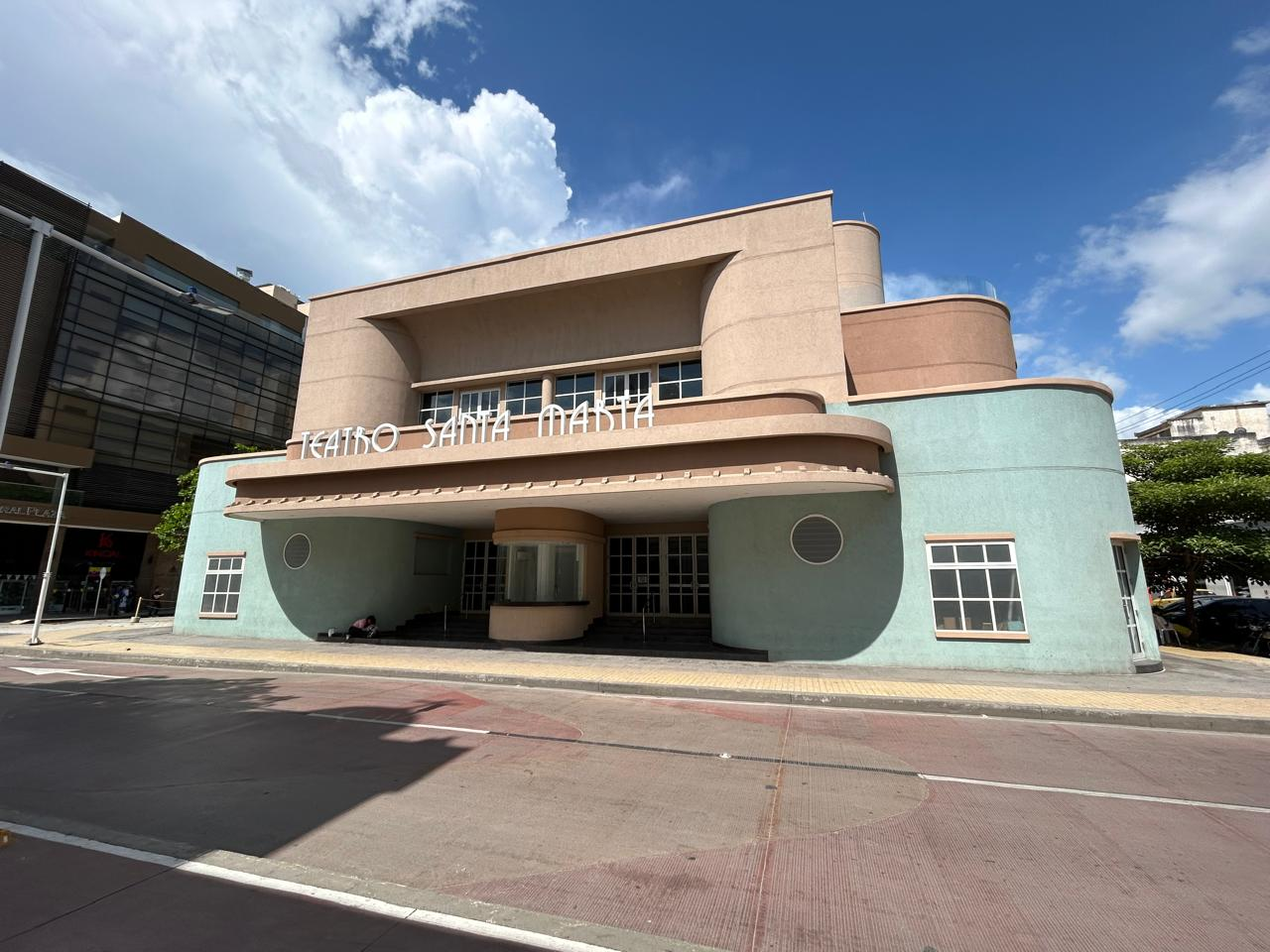
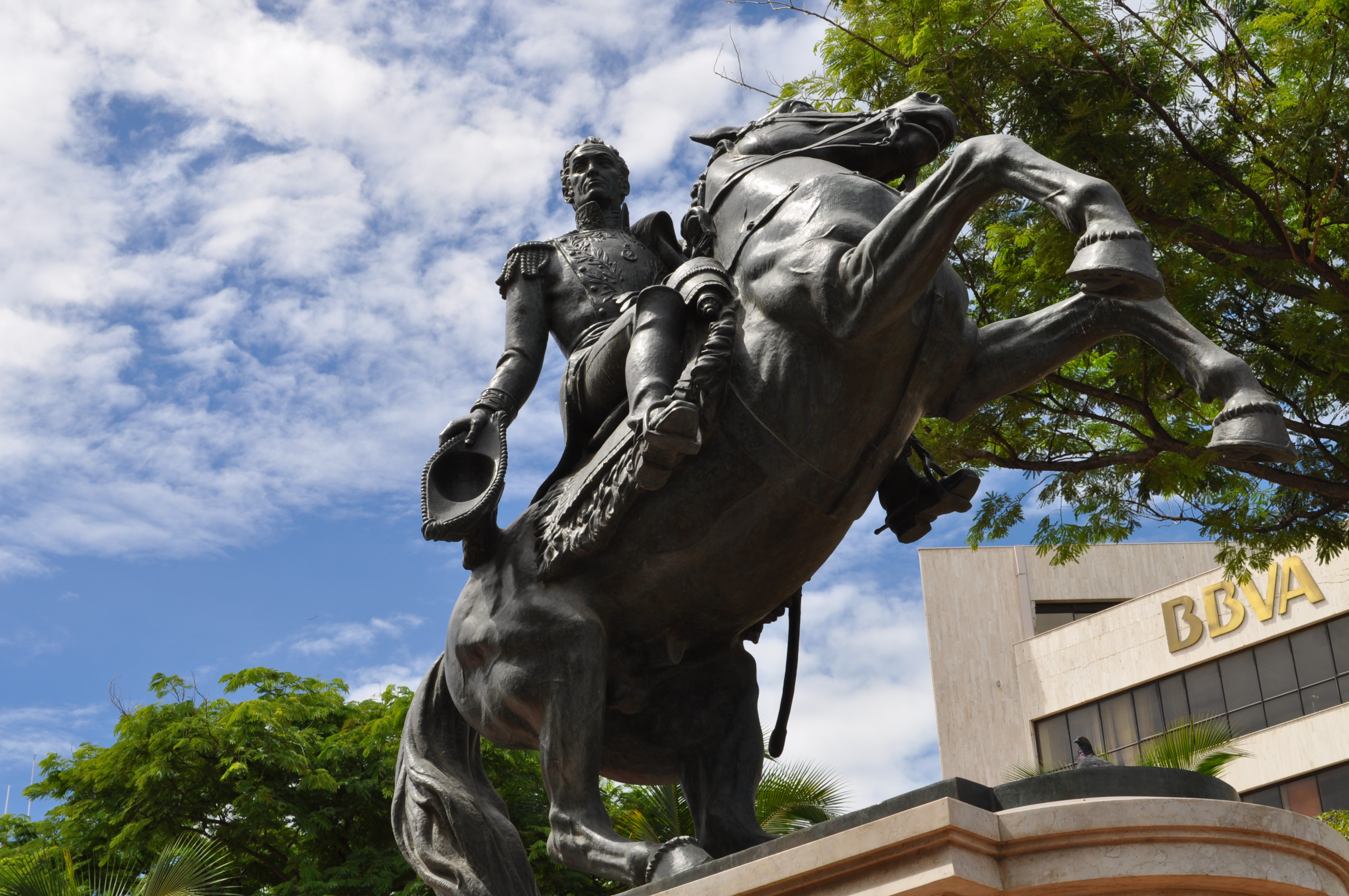
- Panoramic of Santa Marta Bay Arrecife shopping center City hall Santa Marta Theatre Simón Bolivar equestrian statue

- Flag Coat of arms
- Nickname: America's Pearl (La Perla de America)
- Location in the Department of Magdalena; Municipality (red); City (darker red)

- Location in Colombia
- Coordinates: 11°14′31″N 74°12′19″W
- Country: Colombia
- Region: Caribbean Region
- Department: Magdalena
- Foundation: July 29, 1525
- Founder: Rodrigo de Bastidas
- Named for: Martha

Government
  - Mayor: Carlos Alberto Pinedo Cuello (2024–2027) (Movimiento Santa Marta Si Puede)

Area
  - District and city: 2,393.65 km^{2} (924.19 sq mi)
  - Urban: 55.10 km^{2} (21.27 sq mi)
- Elevation: 15 m (49 ft)

Population (2018 census)
  - District and city: 566,150
  - Density: 236.52/km^{2} (612.59/sq mi)
- DANE
- Demonym(s): Samario, -a
- Time zone: UTC-05:00 (Colombia Time)
- Postal codes: 470001–470017
- Area code: 57 + 5
- Website: Official website (in Spanish)

Santa Marta (Spanish pronunciation: [ˌsanta ˈmaɾta]), officially the Distrito Turístico, Cultural e Histórico de Santa Marta (English: Historic, Cultural & Tourist District of Santa Marta), is a port city on the coast of the Caribbean Sea in northern Colombia. It is renowned in Latin American as the place of death of Simón Bolívar.

Santa Marta is the capital of Magdalena Department and the fourth-largest urban city of the Caribbean Region of Colombia, after Barranquilla, Cartagena, and Soledad. Founded on July 29, 1525, by the Spanish conqueror Rodrigo de Bastidas, it was one of the first Spanish settlements in Colombia, its oldest surviving city, and second-oldest in South America. This city is situated on a bay by the same name and as such, it is a prime tourist destination in the Caribbean region.

The Universidad del Magdalena is located in Santa Marta. Santa Marta's flag consists of two colors: white and blue. White symbolises peace, in that all are united without restriction. Blue symbolises the sky, the sea, the magic found in the horizon, and the snow-capped Sierra Nevada mountains. The Cathedral Basilica of Santa Marta is one of the oldest structures in the city. Built in the eighteenth century, it held the remains of Bastidas and Bolívar after their deaths.

== History ==
=== Pre-Columbian times ===
Before the arrival of Europeans, the South American continent was inhabited by a number of indigenous groups. Due to a combination of tropical weather, significant rainfall, and the destruction and misrepresentation of many records by Spanish conquistadors, our understanding of the peoples of this region is limited.

The Tairona formed mid- to large-size population centers, consisting of stone pathways, terraces, protected waterways, and spaces dedicated to agricultural produce. Their economy was primarily agricultural, cultivating corn, pineapple, yucca, and other local foodstuffs. The Tayrona are considered quite advanced for their time period. Surviving archaeological sites consisted of formed terraces and small scale underground stone channels. They were known to actively collect and process salt, which was a significant trading commodity.

They traded with other indigenous groups along the coast and interior. Archaeological excavations have recovered significant works in pottery, stonework and gold.

== Simón Bolívar ==
Simón Bolívar, the liberator of much of South America, spent his last weeks in Santa Marta, and died of tuberculosis in 1830, at the age of 47 at Quinta de San Pedro Alejandrino, Santa Marta. He was buried in the cathedral of Santa Marta, but subsequently his remains were moved to Caracas.

== Geography and Climate ==
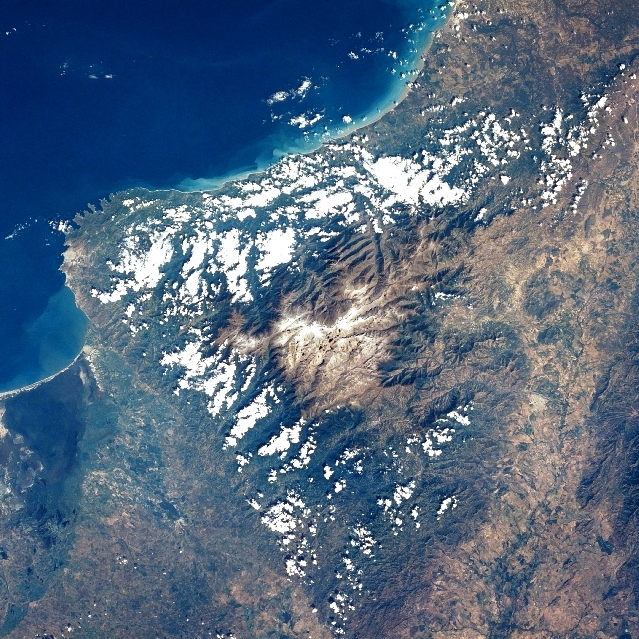
Satellite view of the Sierra Nevada de Santa Marta.

Santa Marta is located on Santa Marta Bay of the Caribbean Sea in the province of Magdalena. It is 992 km from Bogotá and 93 km from Barranquilla. It is bordered to the north and west by the Caribbean and to the south by the municipalities of Aracataca and Ciénaga.

Santa Marta experiences a tropical savanna climate (Köppen Aw), bordering on a hot semi-arid climate, with largely uniform temperatures year round. The dry season lasts from December to April, while the wet season lasts from May to November.

Climate data for Santa Marta (Simón Bolívar International Airport), elevation 4 m (13 ft), (1991–2020)
Month	Jan	Feb	Mar	Apr	May	Jun	Jul	Aug	Sep	Oct	Nov	Dec	Year
Record high °C (°F)	37.0 (98.6)	38.2 (100.8)	37.0 (98.6)	37.6 (99.7)	37.4 (99.3)	37.4 (99.3)	37.8 (100.0)	37.4 (99.3)	38.3 (100.9)	37.2 (99.0)	38.2 (100.8)	37.6 (99.7)	38.3 (100.9)
Mean daily maximum °C (°F)	33.1 (91.6)	33.7 (92.7)	33.9 (93.0)	33.8 (92.8)	33.2 (91.8)	33.3 (91.9)	33.4 (92.1)	33.1 (91.6)	32.9 (91.2)	32.4 (90.3)	32.4 (90.3)	32.7 (90.9)	33.2 (91.8)
Daily mean °C (°F)	27.6 (81.7)	28.1 (82.6)	28.5 (83.3)	29.2 (84.6)	29.3 (84.7)	29.4 (84.9)	29.2 (84.6)	28.9 (84.0)	28.6 (83.5)	28.2 (82.8)	28.0 (82.4)	27.8 (82.0)	28.6 (83.5)
Mean daily minimum °C (°F)	22.6 (72.7)	23.5 (74.3)	24.5 (76.1)	25.5 (77.9)	25.7 (78.3)	25.4 (77.7)	25.0 (77.0)	24.8 (76.6)	24.7 (76.5)	24.4 (75.9)	24.0 (75.2)	23.1 (73.6)	24.4 (75.9)
Record low °C (°F)	17.4 (63.3)	18.3 (64.9)	20.0 (68.0)	19.0 (66.2)	18.0 (64.4)	19.0 (66.2)	18.0 (64.4)	18.0 (64.4)	17.0 (62.6)	17.0 (62.6)	17.0 (62.6)	18.0 (64.4)	17.0 (62.6)
Average precipitation mm (inches)	0.1 (0.00)	1.3 (0.05)	2.2 (0.09)	13.6 (0.54)	51.8 (2.04)	60.2 (2.37)	62.0 (2.44)	62.5 (2.46)	99.0 (3.90)	126.9 (5.00)	74.3 (2.93)	8.3 (0.33)	562.1 (22.13)
Average precipitation days (≥ 1 mm)	0.1	0.2	0.3	1.4	3.9	5.4	6.2	8.5	8.8	8.9	5.6	1.1	50.4
Average relative humidity (%)	74	72	72	74	76	76	77	78	79	80	79	76	76
Mean monthly sunshine hours	285.2	248.4	251.1	228.0	223.2	228.0	232.5	220.1	201.0	204.6	219.0	269.7	2,810.8
Mean daily sunshine hours	9.2	8.8	8.1	7.6	7.2	7.6	7.5	7.1	6.7	6.6	7.3	8.7	7.7
Source: Instituto de Hidrologia Meteorologia y Estudios Ambientales (humidity, sun 1971-2010)

Climate data for Santa Marta (Alto de Mira), elevation 1,080 m (3,540 ft), (1981–2010)
Month	Jan	Feb	Mar	Apr	May	Jun	Jul	Aug	Sep	Oct	Nov	Dec	Year
Mean daily maximum °C (°F)	23.7 (74.7)	23.7 (74.7)	24.9 (76.8)	25.2 (77.4)	25.7 (78.3)	25.8 (78.4)	25.4 (77.7)	25.8 (78.4)	25.8 (78.4)	25.3 (77.5)	24.4 (75.9)	23.8 (74.8)	25.1 (77.2)
Daily mean °C (°F)	19.8 (67.6)	19.7 (67.5)	20.4 (68.7)	21.0 (69.8)	21.6 (70.9)	21.6 (70.9)	21.4 (70.5)	21.5 (70.7)	21.4 (70.5)	21.1 (70.0)	20.8 (69.4)	20.2 (68.4)	20.9 (69.6)
Mean daily minimum °C (°F)	16.6 (61.9)	16.5 (61.7)	17.5 (63.5)	18.3 (64.9)	19.0 (66.2)	19.1 (66.4)	18.8 (65.8)	19.1 (66.4)	19.2 (66.6)	19.0 (66.2)	18.6 (65.5)	17.6 (63.7)	18.4 (65.1)
Average precipitation mm (inches)	81.7 (3.22)	91.1 (3.59)	96.5 (3.80)	225.8 (8.89)	412.5 (16.24)	442.3 (17.41)	377.8 (14.87)	517.4 (20.37)	482.4 (18.99)	457.9 (18.03)	465.7 (18.33)	272.9 (10.74)	3,868.4 (152.30)
Average precipitation days	15	15	17	21	26	25	23	26	26	28	25	18	251
Average relative humidity (%)	92	92	92	93	93	93	93	92	91	91	93	93	92
Source: Instituto de Hidrologia Meteorologia y Estudios Ambientales

Climate data for Santa Marta (Parque Tayrona), elevation 30 m (98 ft), (1981–2010)
Month	Jan	Feb	Mar	Apr	May	Jun	Jul	Aug	Sep	Oct	Nov	Dec	Year
Mean daily maximum °C (°F)	29.3 (84.7)	29.4 (84.9)	29.6 (85.3)	29.8 (85.6)	30.4 (86.7)	30.9 (87.6)	31.0 (87.8)	31.3 (88.3)	31.4 (88.5)	31.0 (87.8)	30.4 (86.7)	29.6 (85.3)	30.4 (86.7)
Daily mean °C (°F)	25.1 (77.2)	25.4 (77.7)	25.7 (78.3)	26.4 (79.5)	26.9 (80.4)	27.2 (81.0)	27.0 (80.6)	27.1 (80.8)	27.0 (80.6)	26.6 (79.9)	26.5 (79.7)	25.6 (78.1)	26.4 (79.5)
Mean daily minimum °C (°F)	20.7 (69.3)	21.3 (70.3)	22.1 (71.8)	22.9 (73.2)	23.4 (74.1)	23.5 (74.3)	23.3 (73.9)	23.2 (73.8)	22.8 (73.0)	22.9 (73.2)	22.7 (72.9)	22.1 (71.8)	22.6 (72.7)
Average precipitation mm (inches)	33.8 (1.33)	32.7 (1.29)	29.3 (1.15)	105.6 (4.16)	138.2 (5.44)	70.4 (2.77)	70.3 (2.77)	106.3 (4.19)	175.0 (6.89)	266.3 (10.48)	211.9 (8.34)	154.2 (6.07)	1,248.4 (49.15)
Average precipitation days	5	5	6	11	12	8	7	10	14	17	17	11	120
Average relative humidity (%)	87	86	86	85	87	87	86	87	88	90	90	89	87
Mean monthly sunshine hours	204.6	169.4	179.8	147.0	151.9	159.0	189.1	189.1	174.0	155.0	168.0	164.3	2,051.2
Mean daily sunshine hours	6.6	6.0	5.8	4.9	4.9	5.3	6.1	6.1	5.8	5.0	5.6	5.3	5.6
Source: Instituto de Hidrologia Meteorologia y Estudios Ambientales

Climate data for Santa Marta (San Lorenzo), elevation 2,200 m (7,200 ft), (1981–2010)
Month	Jan	Feb	Mar	Apr	May	Jun	Jul	Aug	Sep	Oct	Nov	Dec	Year
Mean daily maximum °C (°F)	17.4 (63.3)	17.7 (63.9)	17.9 (64.2)	18.0 (64.4)	18.2 (64.8)	18.6 (65.5)	18.6 (65.5)	18.4 (65.1)	17.8 (64.0)	17.2 (63.0)	16.9 (62.4)	17.1 (62.8)	17.8 (64.0)
Daily mean °C (°F)	12.4 (54.3)	13.0 (55.4)	13.3 (55.9)	13.9 (57.0)	14.3 (57.7)	14.4 (57.9)	14.2 (57.6)	14.1 (57.4)	13.7 (56.7)	13.5 (56.3)	13.3 (55.9)	12.7 (54.9)	13.6 (56.5)
Mean daily minimum °C (°F)	7.7 (45.9)	8.2 (46.8)	8.8 (47.8)	9.7 (49.5)	10.2 (50.4)	10.2 (50.4)	9.9 (49.8)	10.0 (50.0)	9.8 (49.6)	9.7 (49.5)	9.2 (48.6)	8.1 (46.6)	9.3 (48.7)
Average precipitation mm (inches)	17.5 (0.69)	27.6 (1.09)	34.7 (1.37)	162.7 (6.41)	285.9 (11.26)	319.9 (12.59)	337.1 (13.27)	381.9 (15.04)	410.6 (16.17)	387.5 (15.26)	255.3 (10.05)	109.6 (4.31)	2,730.1 (107.48)
Average precipitation days	3	3	5	14	21	21	21	25	26	25	20	8	188
Average relative humidity (%)	89	89	91	93	93	93	92	93	93	94	93	91	92
Mean monthly sunshine hours	96.1	84.7	89.9	78.0	77.5	84.0	105.4	96.1	72.0	55.8	51.0	77.5	968
Mean daily sunshine hours	3.1	3.0	2.9	2.6	2.5	2.8	3.4	3.1	2.4	1.8	1.7	2.5	2.7
Source: Instituto de Hidrologia Meteorologia y Estudios Ambientales

== Economy ==
Santa Marta's economy is based primarily on tourism, followed by trade, port activities, fishing and, agriculture. The main agricultural products are: bananas, coffee, mango, citrus cultivars, cocoa and cassava.

=== Infrastructure ===
Santa Marta is a major port. Simón Bolívar International Airport (IATA: SMR) is 16 km (10 mi) from the city centre. Historic figure Simón Bolívar died here, a significant event for South America as a whole. His villa known as La Quinta de San Pedro Alejandrino is located just outside the city centre. As the main city centre is located close to the coast, the city itself has had difficulty controlling expansion. Although, technically a separate locality, Rodadero is part of Santa Marta itself.

== Gallery ==
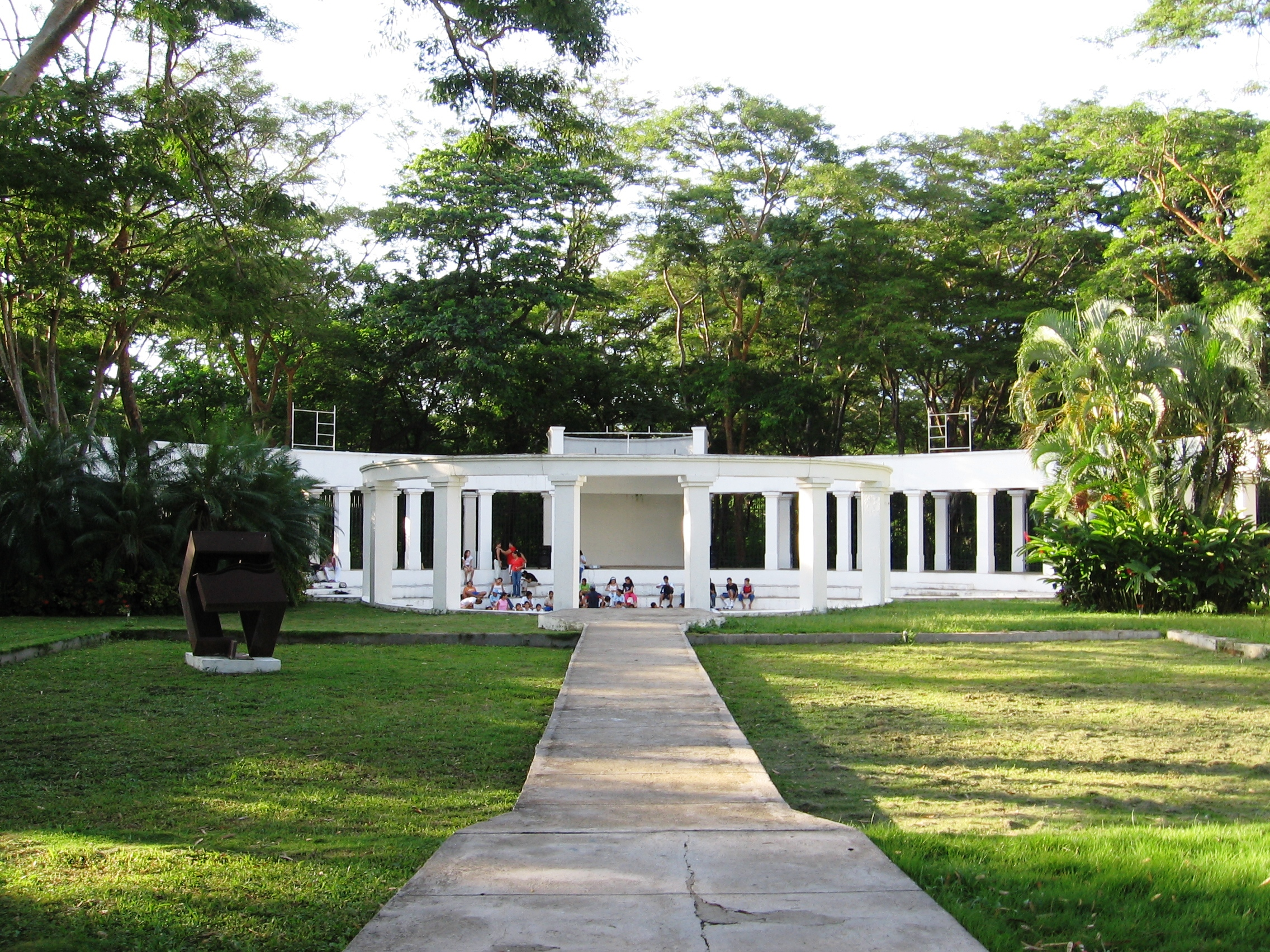
Quinta de San Pedro Alejandrino in Santa Marta

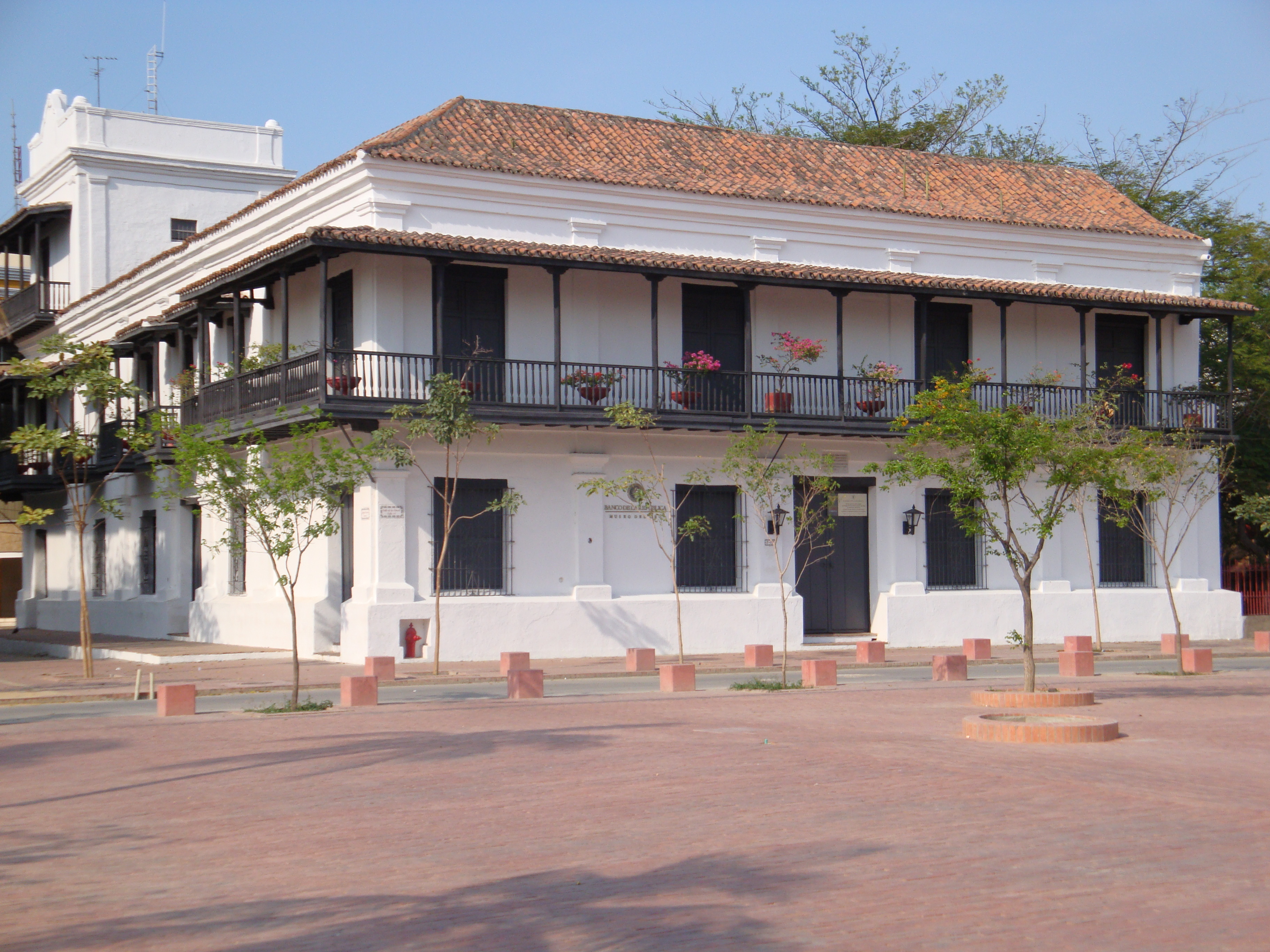
Casa de la Aduana

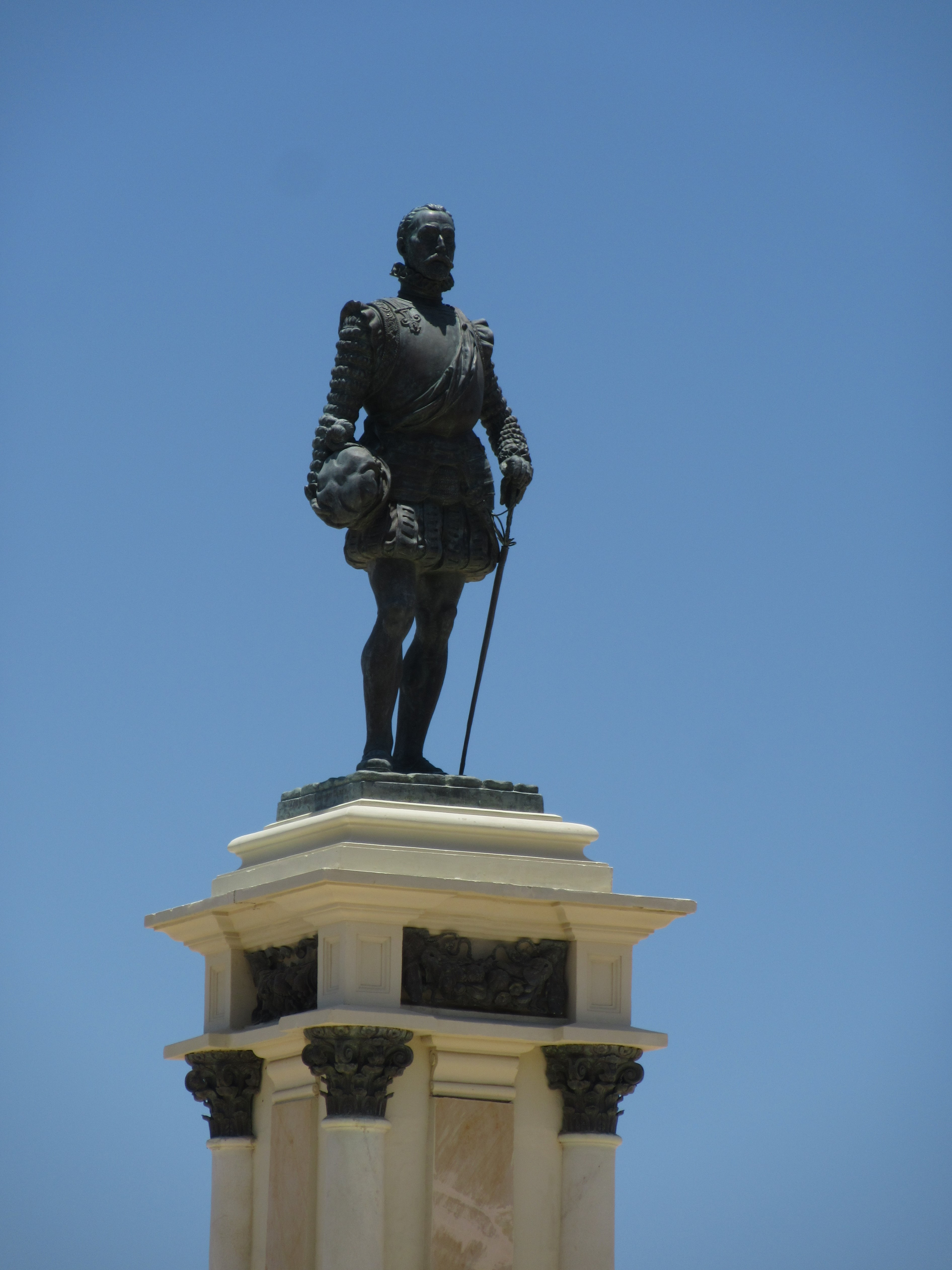
Statue of Rodrigo de Bastidas
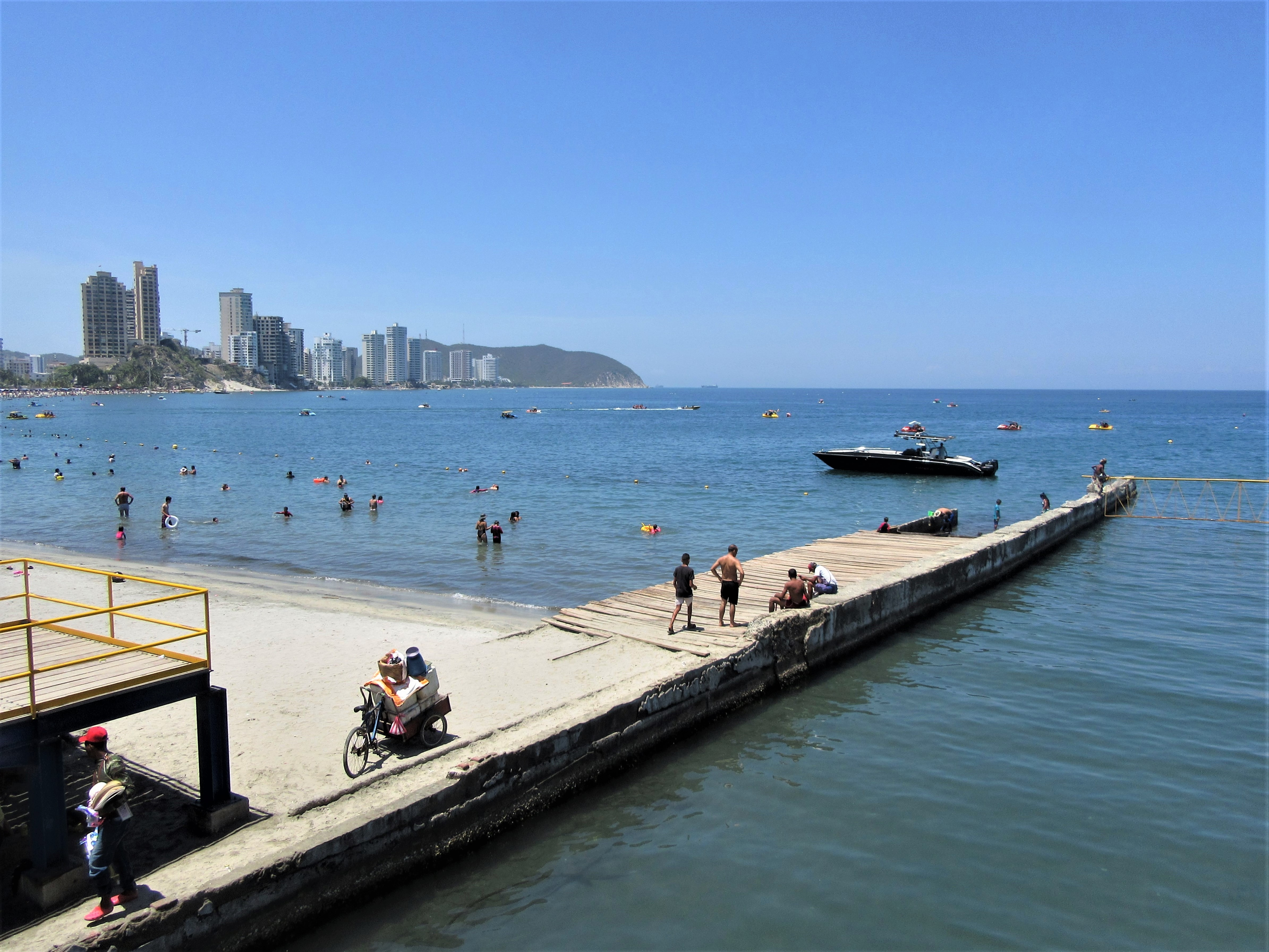
Rodadero, Santa Marta

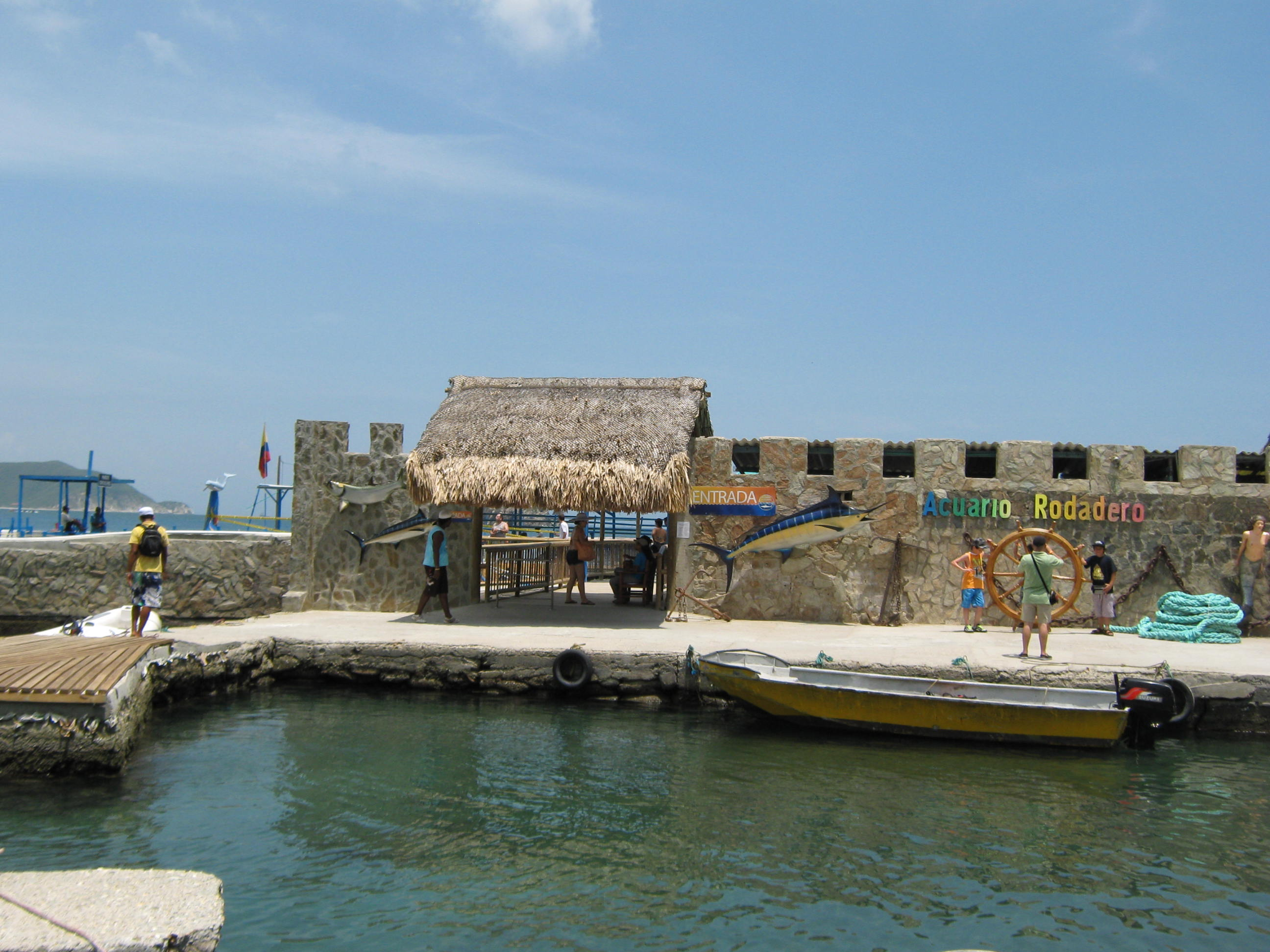
Rodadero aquarium

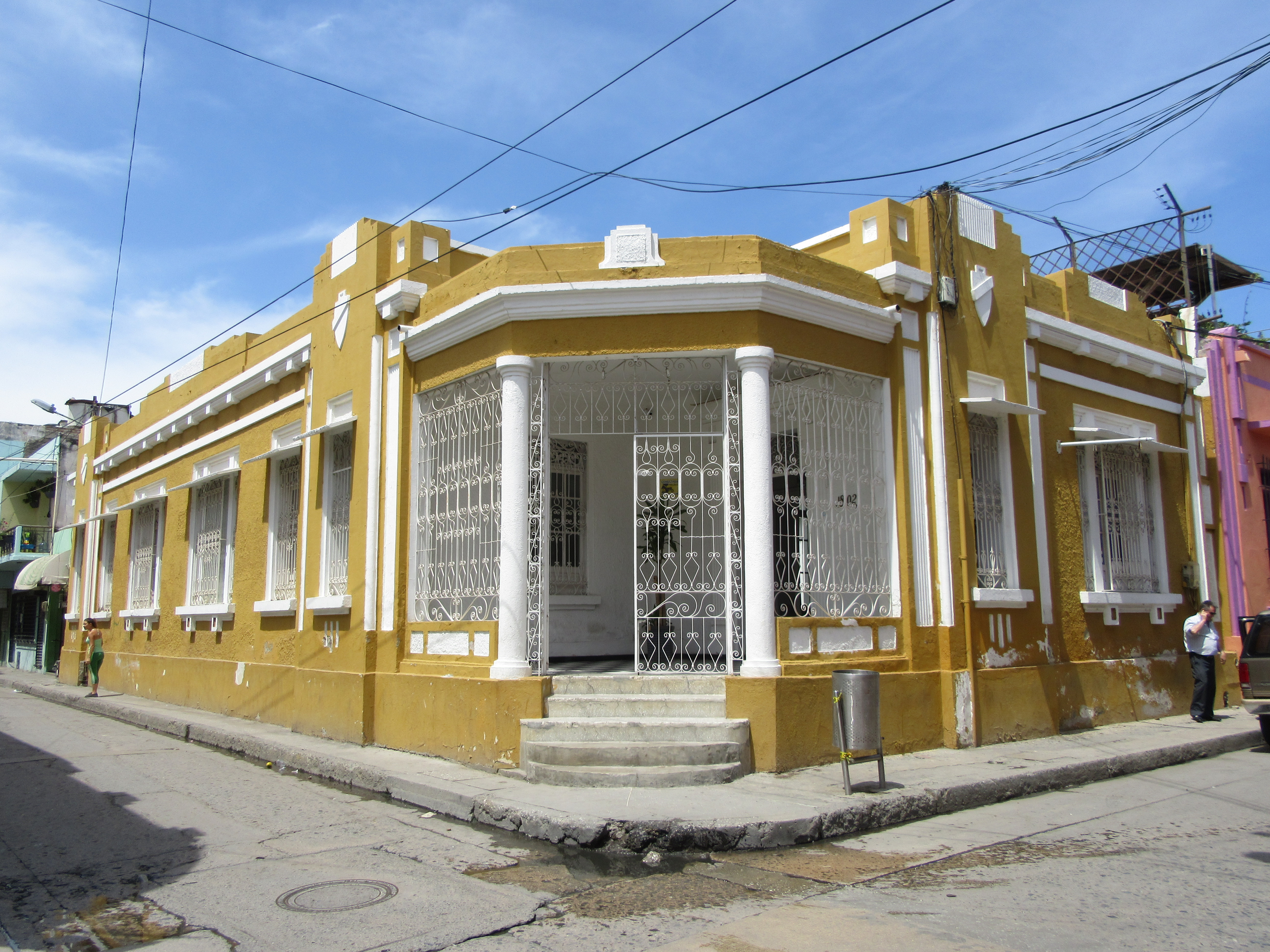
Traditional house in Santa Marta
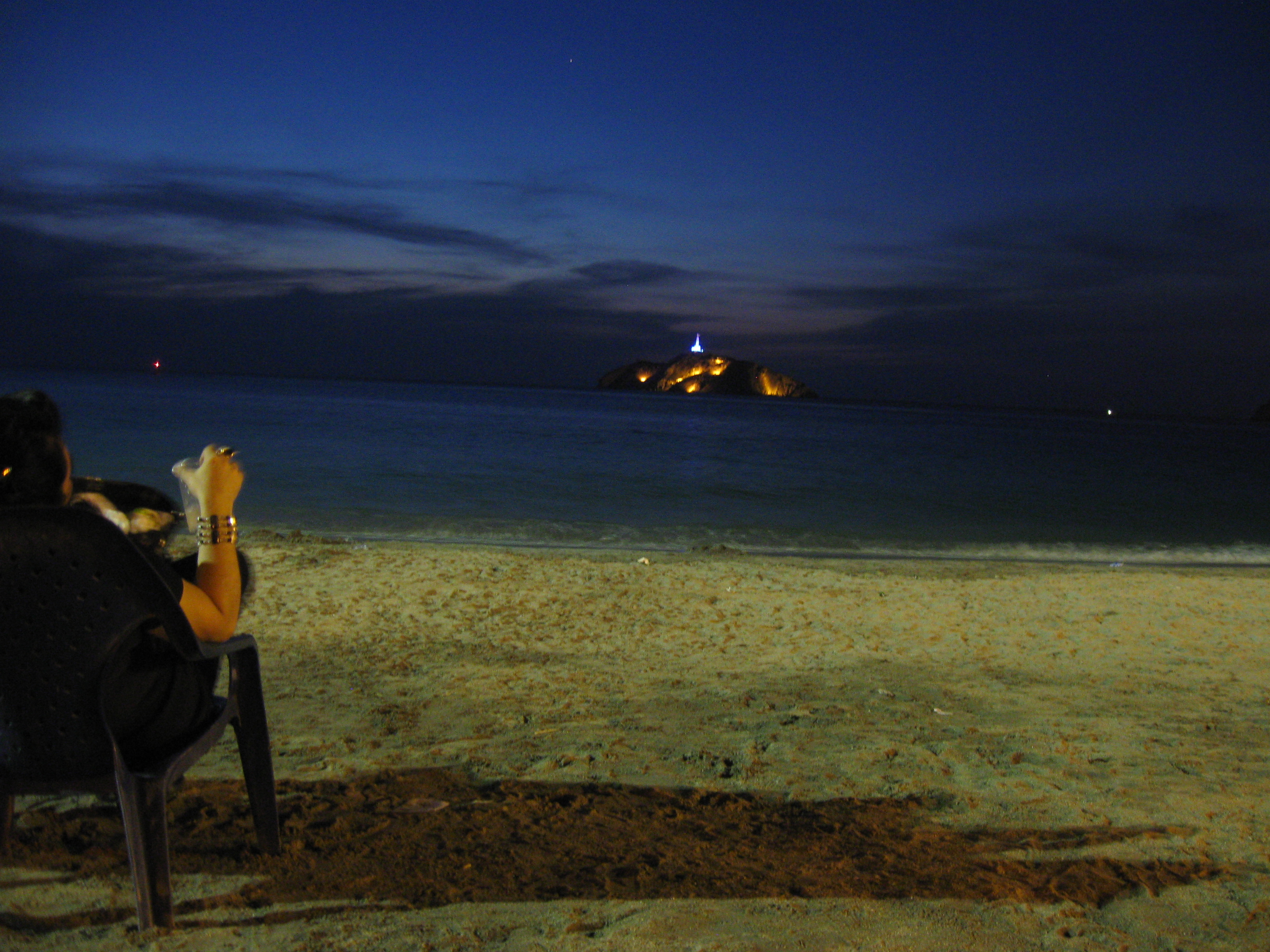
Lighthouse in the bay of Santa Marta

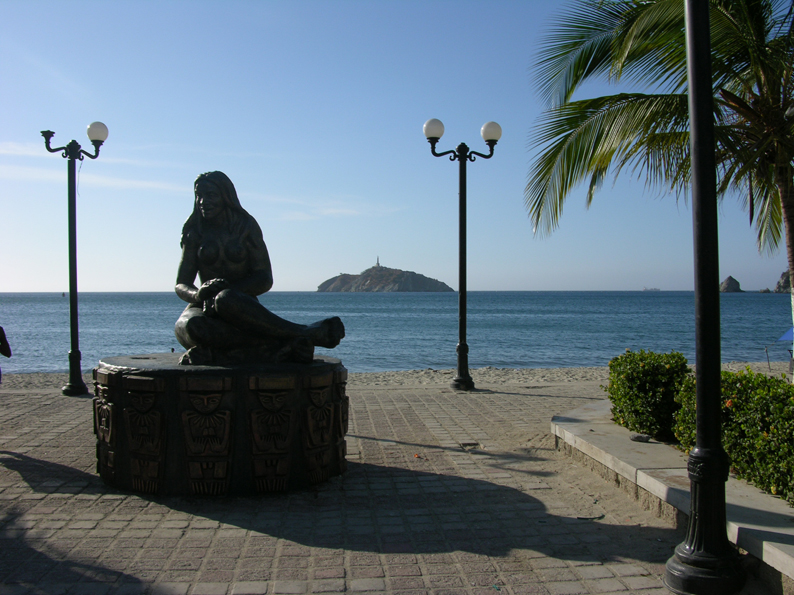
El Morro island off the coast of Santa Marta

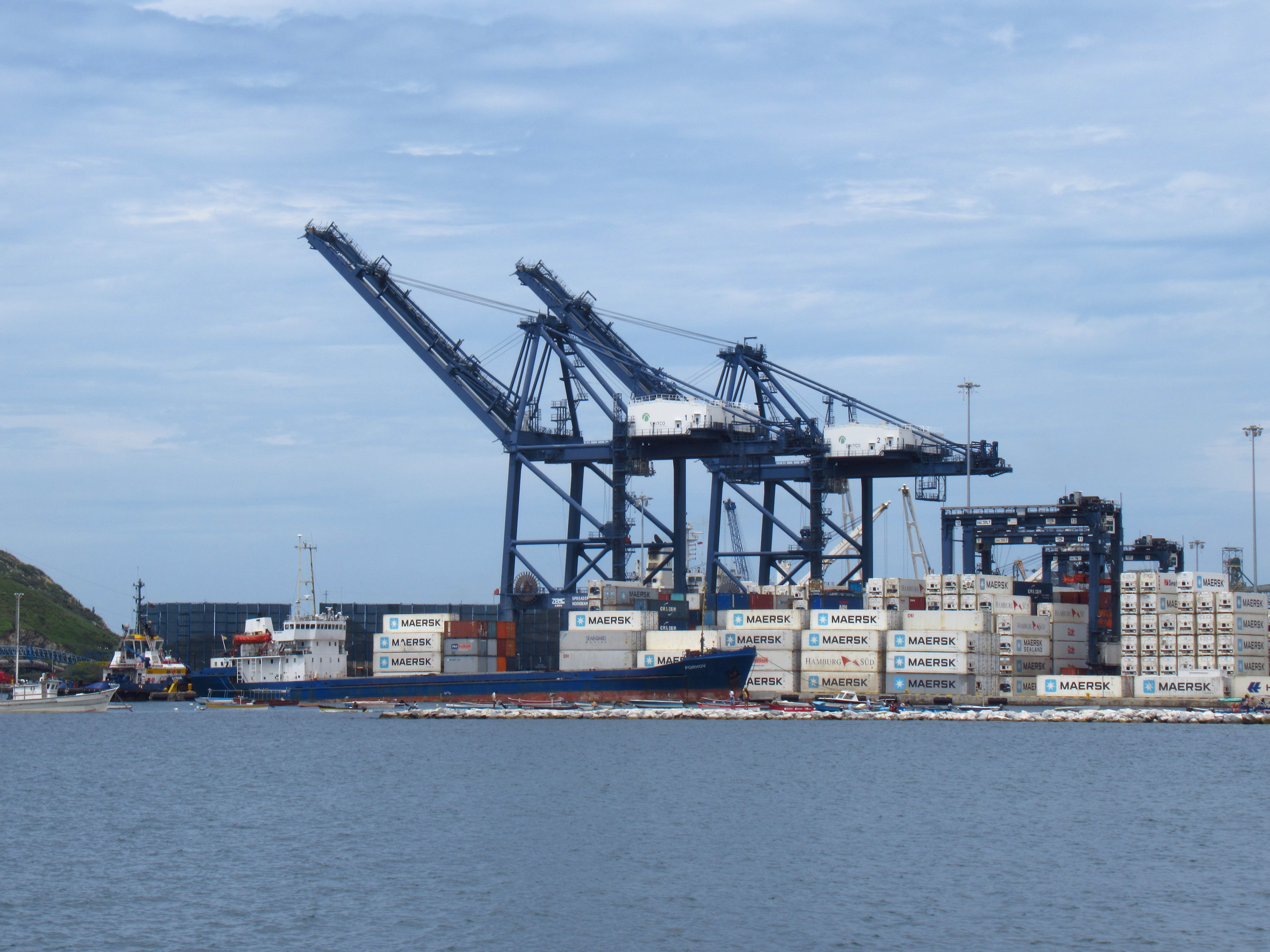
Harbour of Santa Marta

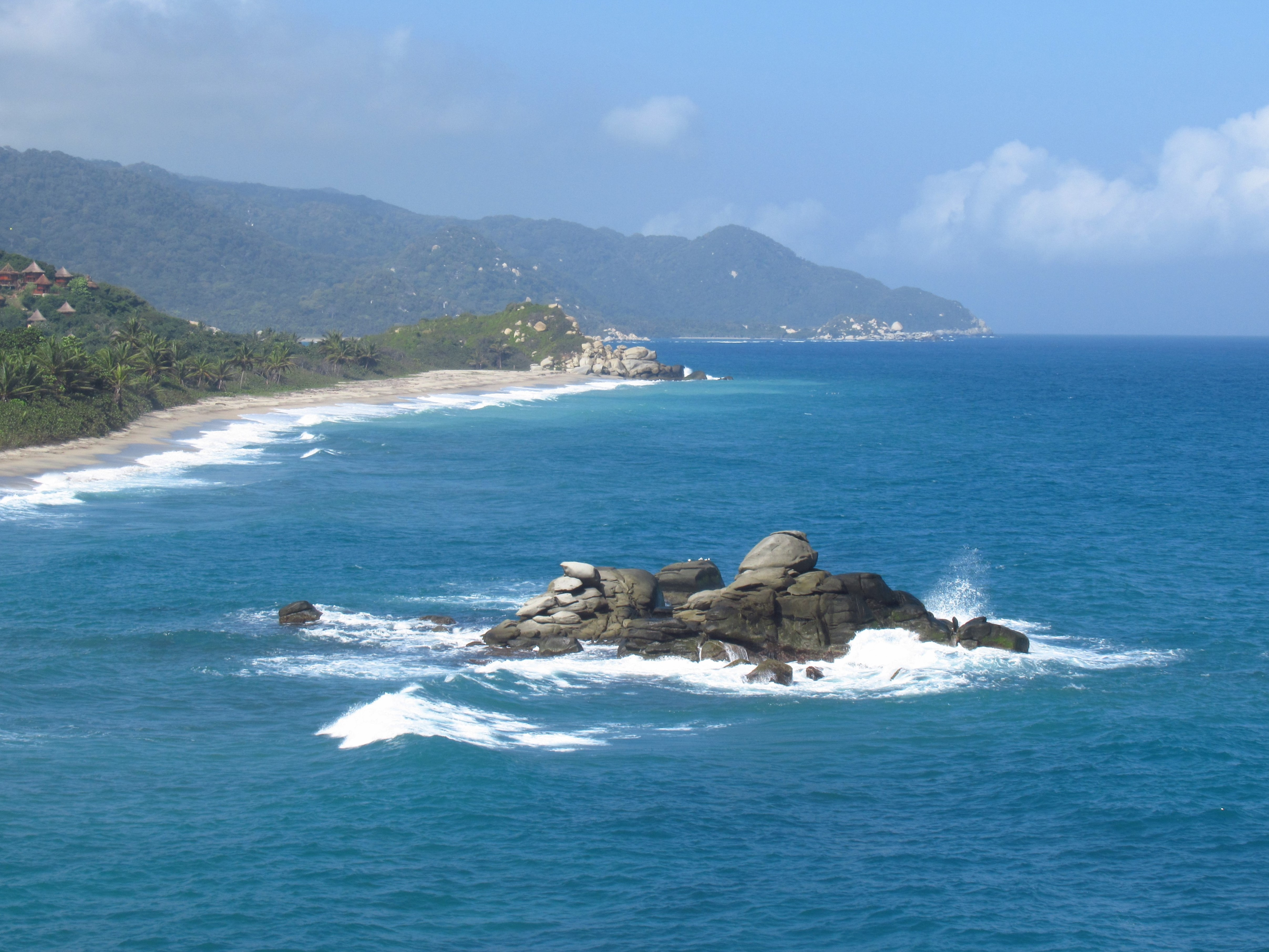
Tayrona National Natural Park
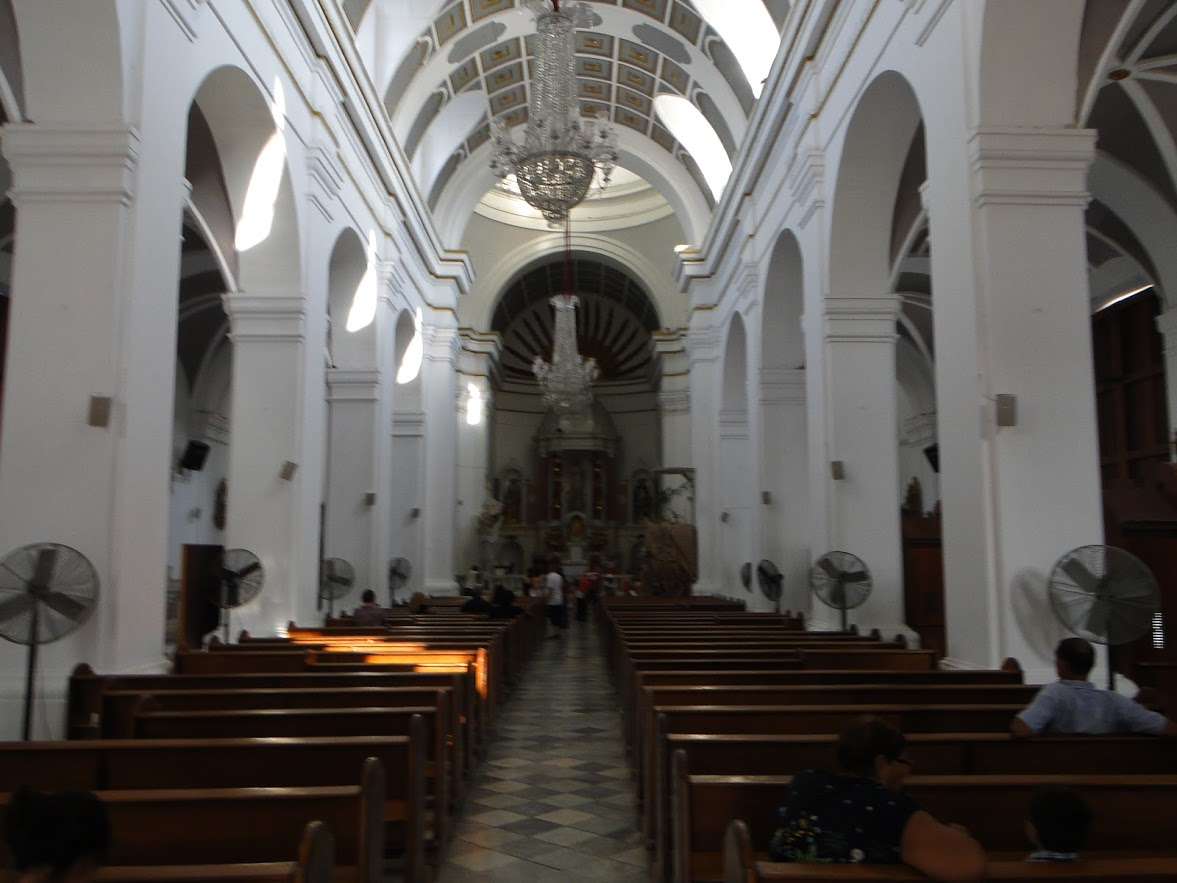
The cathedral (inner view)

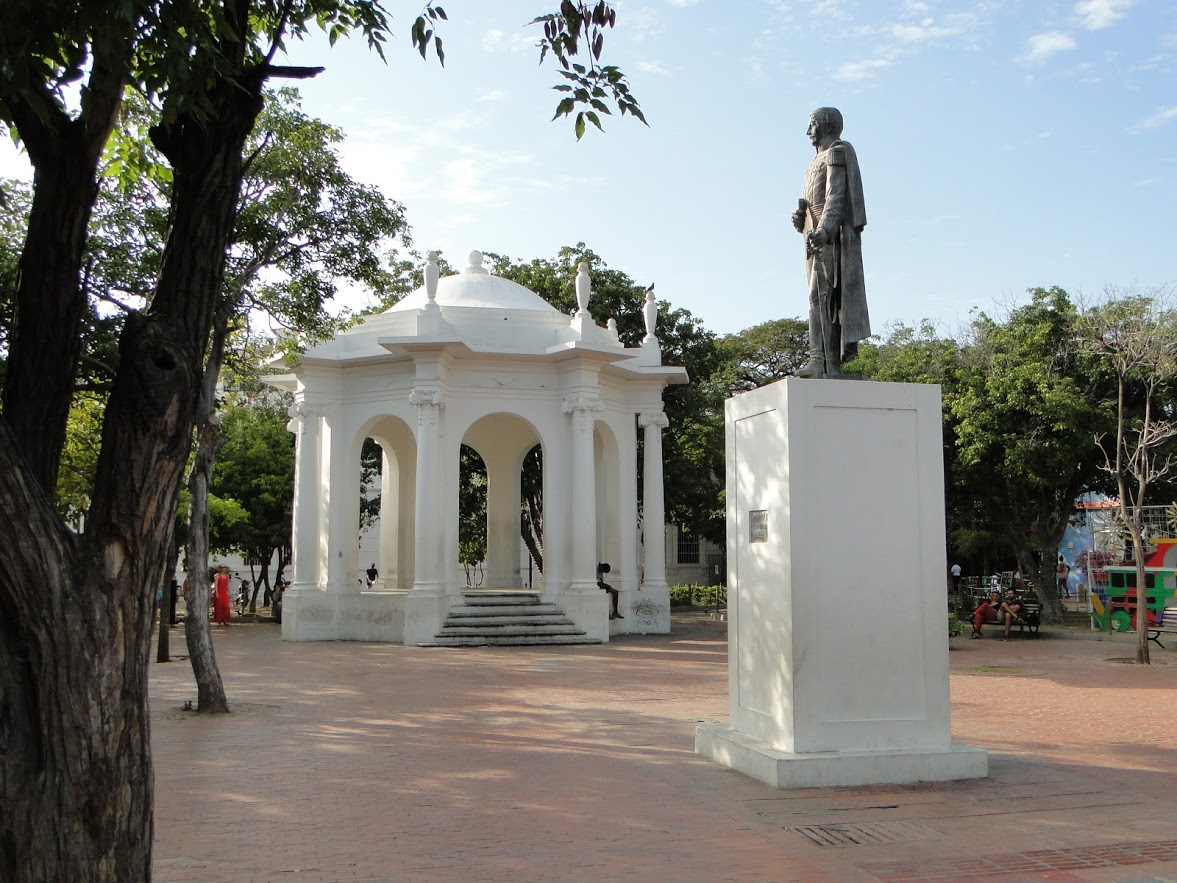
On central square

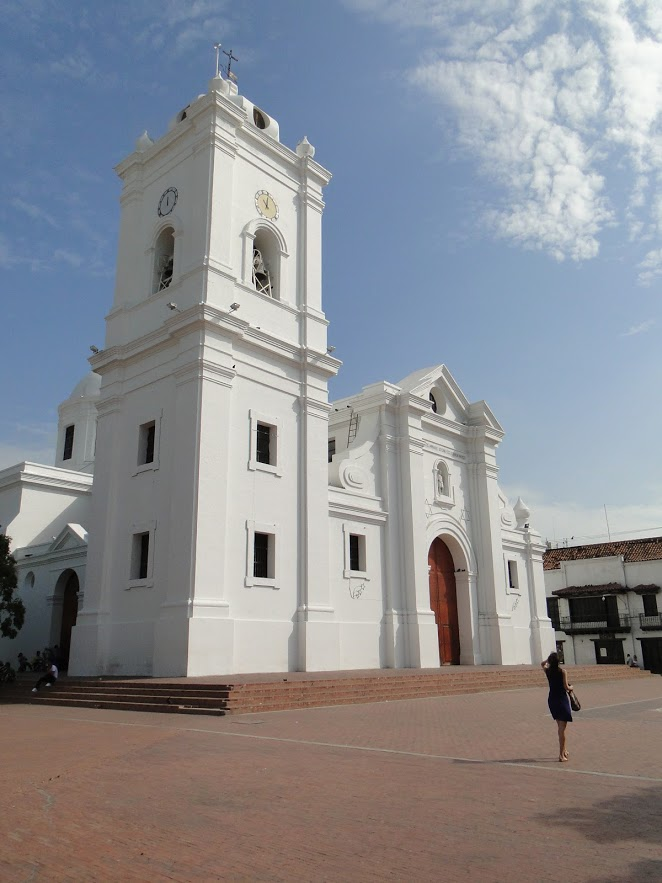
The cathedral

== Notable people ==
- Antony de Ávila, professional footballer
- Jaime Bateman Cayón, founder and leader of the M19 political movement
- Simón Bolívar, liberator of Gran Colombia, died in Santa Marta
- Julio Bovea, musician
- Sergio Díaz-Granados Guida, IDB Executive Director for Colombia and Peru
- Lalo Ebratt, Reggaeton singer
- Radamel Falcao, professional footballer
- Jesús Ferreira, professional footballer
- Maria Claudia Lacouture, executive director of the Colombo American Chamber of Commerce
- Alejandro Palacio, singer of vallenato music
- Arturo Reyes, football coach
- Aldo Leão Ramírez, professional footballer
- Li Saumet, vocalist of Bomba Estéreo band
- Andrés Solano, professional footballer
- Luis Javier Suárez, professional footballer
- Carlos Valderrama, professional footballer
- Taliana Vargas, actress and model
- Carlos Vives, singer of vallenato music
- Johan Vonlanthen, professional footballer

== Media appearances ==
Santa Marta is the production location of the TV series The White Slave.

== See also ==
- Ciudad Perdida
- Taganga
- Tayrona National Natural Park
