= Maria Claudia Lacouture =

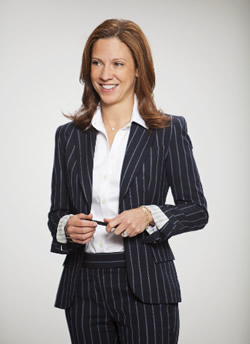
- Lacouture in 2021

Minister of Commerce, Industry, Tourism
- In office 4 May 2016 – 21 August 2017
- President: Juan Manuel Santos
- Preceded by: Cecilia Álvarez-Correa Glen

Personal details
- Born: 1974 (age 51–52) Santa Marta, Colombia
- Party: Social Party of National Unity
- Education: Universidad Externado de Colombia (BA); Cornell University (MS)
- Profession: Accountant; Economist

Maria Claudia Lacouture (born 1974) is a Colombian businesswoman who served as the Minister of Commerce, Industry, Tourism from 2016 to 2017. She is currently the head of the Colombo American Chamber of Commerce.

== Education ==
Maria Claudia Lacouture studied Finance and International Relations at the University Externado de Colombia, and then pursued further postgraduate studies in Marketing and Economics at Cornell University in the United States.

== Biography ==
She is currently the Executive Director of the Colombo American Chamber of Commerce, (AmCham Colombia). She was Minister of Commerce, Industry and Tourism (2016-2017), President of ProColombia (2010-2016), Manager of the 'Colombia es Pasión' campaign and Vice-president of 'Imagen País' (2007-2009).

In 2015, Fast Company magazine rated her as the fourth most creative person in the business world from a list of 100 people which included Google, Nike, Pinterest and General Electric representatives among others.

Maria Claudia worked as a researcher for the Swiss Multinational consulting company Egon Zehnder International and also held roles as Content Administrator and Coordinator at Yupi Internet in Miami where she was in charge of dealing with business content for the B2B at Yupi.com and the development of the online bilingual business portal for the Americas.

She also worked as a specialist in foreign trade at Trade Wing Networks for product development of agricultural goods and sales strategy for Colombian coffee in the US market.

She started working at ProColombia in the Market Intelligence area in Bogotá and afterwards served as Marketing and Foreign Trade consultant and Tourism Director in the Commercial Office in United States, where she led the strategy for international cruise liners to return to Colombia.
