= José María Morales =

Argentine military officer (1818–1984)

Provincial Senator of Buenos Aires
- In office 1878–1879

Provincial Deputy of Buenos Aires
- In office 1871–1873

Personal details
- Born: August 14, 1818 Buenos Aires, United Provinces of the Río de la Plata
- Died: October 23, 1894 (aged 76) Buenos Aires, Argentina
- Party: Unitarian Party; Liberal Party

Military service
- Allegiance: (Argentina) United Provinces of South America; State of Buenos Aires
- Rank: Colonel

Colonel José María Morales (August 14, 1818 – October 23, 1894) was a military officer and Afro-Argentine legislator who fought in the Argentine civil war and the Paraguayan War.

== Early life ==
José María Morales was born in Buenos Aires, United Provinces of the Río de la Plata, the son of a military patriot who fought in the British invasions. He also followed a military career and was part of the troops of Manuel Oribe until aged 20 he emigrated to Montevideo. On July 2, 1839, he joined the Freedom Legion that, under the orders of Juan Lavalle, went to the island of Martín García. In the campaign that followed, Morales fought in the battles of Yeruá, Don Cristobal and Sauce Grande. He took part in the further advancement on Buenos Aires and the retreat north. He fought in the Battle of Quebracho Herrado, in San Cala, and Famaillá.

== Military career ==
In 1843, he joined the Argentina Legion in the defense of Montevideo, which was besieged by the forces of the Confederacy and Oribe. He fought in the general breakout to Las Tres Cruces, El Buceo, in El Cerro and in other actions. Upon dissolution of the Legion, he left for the province of Corrientes to join the army under General José María Paz. He remained there until 1850. He stuck to the 'Pronouncement of Urquiza' and fought in the battle of Caseros.

Back in his home city, he participated in the revolution of September 11, 1852, fighting against the national authorities in the battalion commanded by Colonel Domingo Sosa. During the siege of Buenos Aires by Hilario Lagos he was seriously wounded and transferred to the Invalid Corps with the rank of sergeant major. Upon resumption of the war between the Confederation and the State of Argentina, Buenos Aires, he fought bravely in the Battle of Cepeda (1859) leading a bayonet charge. Upon returning to Buenos Aires with the squad under the command of Antonio Susini he was at the naval action of San Nicolas de los Arroyos (1859). He fought in the Battle of Pavón (1861) that eventually ended the conflict. Between campaigns he worked as a tinsmith to support his family.

When the war with Paraguay started in 1865 under the command of the 2nd Battalion of Regiment No. 3, Morales fought in the battles of Yatay, Uruguaiana, Paso de la Patria, Itapiru and Bellaco Estero. He also fought in Tuyuti, Boqueron, Curupaytí, Humaita, Lomas Valentinas and Angostura.

In November 1868, he was promoted to colonel. After the war, in 1870, he was appointed Assistant Chief of the Militia of the Southern Border of the province of Buenos Aires and as such helped to quell the Indian uprising in Sierra Chica and Tapalqué. He then served as an auditor in Las Flores and Azul (Buenos Aires). In 1871 he was elected deputy to the provincial legislature and formed part of the commission reforming the constitution of Buenos Aires.

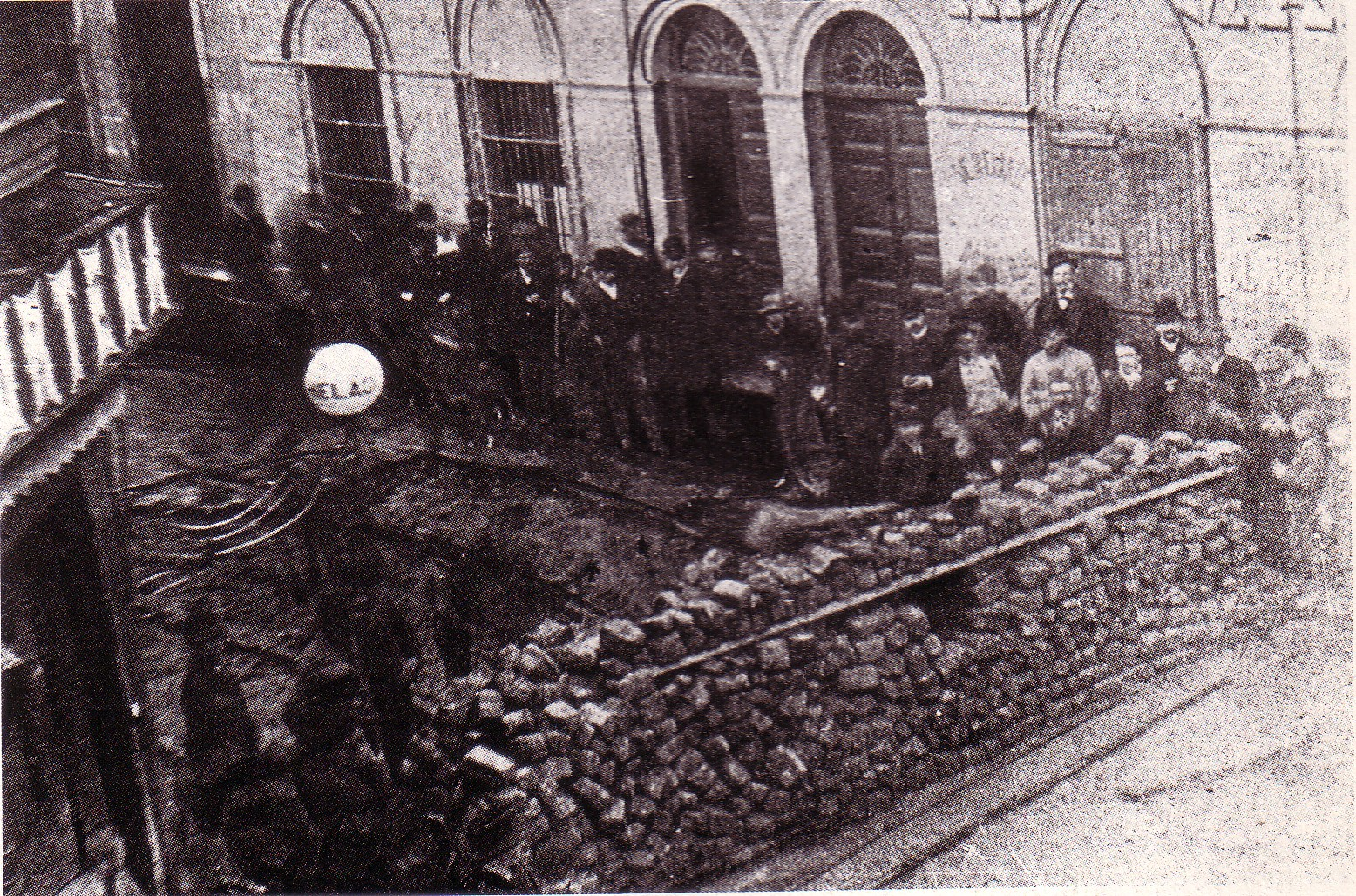
Revolutionary barricade protecting the Artillery Park (1890).

During the revolution of 1874 he served as chief of staff of the "Constitutional Army" of General Ignacio Rivas. He attended the Battle of La Verde and was among those who surrendered in Junín (Buenos Aires). He was invalided out of the army. In the uprising of 1880 he again joined the revolutionary ranks in front of the battalions of volunteers Mitre Sosa and acting as commander of the South District in the defence of the city. He participated in the Battle of Puente Alsina and the Battle of the Corrales Viejos. He returned to arms in the revolution of 1890, was chief of the forces that defended the Parque Artillería until its surrender.

== Political career ==
Between January 1891 and August 1893 he administered the national penitentiary. On three occasions he occupied a seat in the provincial legislature. During one of them, as a senator, he fought the project intended to promote him to General for his performance in the revolution of 1880. Contrary to the opinion of Dr. Lastra, Morales said the Senate could not make the promotion and that the sacrifices made did not deserve such a great reward.

He died in Buenos Aires on October 23, 1894, in the last months of the presidency of Luis Sáenz Peña. His remains were buried in La Recoleta Cemetery in an impressive ceremony escorted in formation by Battalion No.10 in line under Lieutenant Colonel Toscano. Among others present were the ministers Manuel Quintana, Eduardo Costa, José A. Terry, General Luis Maria Campos, Lieutenant General Bartolomé Mitre, Nicolás Lavalle, generals José Miguel Arredondo, Viedma, José Inocencio Arias, Antonio Donovan, colonels José María Fernández, Pérez, Francisco Ribeiro, Rodriguez, Martin Guerrico, commanders Joaquin Montaña, Guillermo Rawson, Toulouse, Saraví, Nadal, Saenz and Masson, and doctors José María Gutiérrez, Mariano Varela, Luis Varela, Juan Torrent, Aristóbulo del Valle, Dardo Rocha, Carlos Urien, Orma, Jose Maria Child, and Bonifacio Lastra.

Eduardo Gutierrez, chronicler of the movement of Buenos Aires, 1880, said that "few men are as patriotic and dignified as Colonel Morales. He loved his country above all else, and where he fought for freedom and principles, he would always offer a generous quota of blood to uphold the rule of law (...) If governments have forgotten his services, they are engraved in the hearts of the people, who love and respect him."

Mitre called him "one of the most worthy leaders who have served the nation."
