= Celestino Barcala =

Celestino Barcala, the warrior son of Independence Colonel Lorenzo Barcala, was a key player on the Argentine civil wars in the north-west, reaching the rank of major national army.

== Biography ==
Barcala took part in the revolution of May 1866 in the province of Catamarca against Miguel Molina, the commanding officer of Governor Victor Maubecín.

With the rank of lieutenant, he was responsible for executing Estanislao Pucheta, a captain of a company of the civic guard, who was shot by a firing squad inside the barracks. Barcala denied him the last rites.

At the time of the second invasion of Felipe Varela, Barcala was in charge of the vanguard of national forces.

Varela, who was in Jáchal, ordered his lieutenant Estanislao Medina to occupy the village of Chilecito, which took effect on 18 February 1867. On the march toward the village he joined the leader Severo Chumbita.

On March 4, Medina's army reached the outskirts of Tinogasta. Barcala asked Lt. Col. Meliton Cordova to "march to the fields of San Jose to offer battle". Cordova did not respond and stayed in the villa, but Barcala took charge of the troops and led his men to the battle.

A popular song then recalled that:

Before coming to High

lines were drawn,

shot to the forefront

Barcala commanded.

With Barcala back to the village, Medina split his troops into columns and entered the village streets. After three hours of intense fighting, Tinogasta fell to the rebel army. Cordova died in combat while Barcala and other officers fled to the disaster. On his way to Belén, Barcala was captured while crossing the river Abaucán. Luis Medina Quiroga shot the commander in sight but he kept Barcala alive.

At the end of this month, Medina met Varela at Chimbicha, 60 km from Catamarca. Varela's forces amounted to about 5000 men with three guns. After a grueling forced march and, on April 9, the day after the battle of Pozo de Vargas, after midnight Felipe Varela arrived in Tables (20 km from La Rioja), without being harassed by the government forces.

In the afternoon, Medina ordered the execution of the prisoners. Balbino Arias Lieutenant and three civilians, militia commanders and Fermin Bazan septuagenarian Vicente Barros and Fernando Vega, an important neighbor of the town of Famatina were executed along with Barcala.

After the failure of the movement, Colonel Severo Chumbita, like his son, Captain Ambrose Chumbita, was prosecuted criminally by the rebellion from 1861 to 1863 and 1867, and for offenses committed during them. Regarding the latter, the sentence he was convicted of taking part as principal chief in the rebellion led by Felipe Varela but also of events that qualify as common crimes and therefore excluded him from the general amnesty granted by Octavian Navarro and sentencing him to ten years of exile and 2000 piastres fine. Among these crimes he was accused of Barcala death, Arias and three civilians. Eventually, on 4 November 1876 the court acquitted Chumbita crimes against him, except for charges relating to crimes committed during the rebellion of 1861 to 1863.

One historian says that Barcala was "infantry battalion commander, brave and reputed man of color, excellent education."
