= Domingo Sosa =

Argentine Army officer (1788–1866)

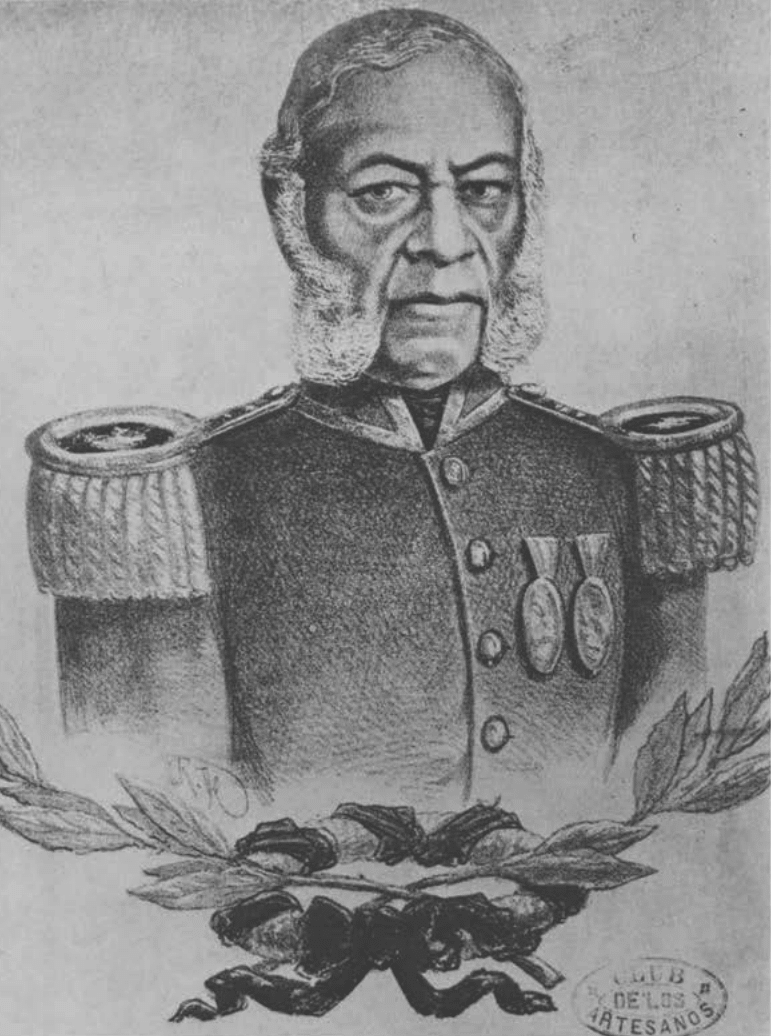

Provincial Deputy of Buenos Aires
- In office 1856–1858
- In office 1852–1854

Personal details
- Born: 1788 Buenos Aires, Viceroyalty of the Río de la Plata
- Died: 1866 (aged 77–78) Buenos Aires, Argentine Confederation
- Party: Federal Party

Military service
- Allegiance: (Argentina) United Provinces of South America; State of Buenos Aires
- Rank: Colonel

Colonel Domingo Sosa (1788 – May 1866) was an Argentine soldier and later an army colonel who took part in the wars of independence and in the Argentine civil war. He later became a politician, serving as a member of the Chamber of Deputies of the State of Buenos Aires, and as a member of the province's 1854 constitutional convention. He was the first Afro-Argentine to be elected to such high offices.

== Biography ==
Born a slave, Sosa had no education, though he subsequently managed to learn to read and write. He was enlisted into the Regimiento de Castas (a mixed-race regiment) of the city in 1808. From 1811 he took part in the two sieges of Montevideo until their end, taking part in the attack in the Battle of Cerrito, with the toughest part of the conflict borne by the "blacks" in the regiment of Colonel Miguel Estanislao Soler. On being mentioned in dispatches he was promoted to the rank of lieutenant. In April 1813 he took part in a campaign under the orders of Domingo French, to secure the frontier area of the river Yaguarón against incursion from Portuguese forces entering from Brasil.

In early 1815 he was sent to the Army of the North, and participated in the Battle of Sipe Sipe. He was sent back to Buenos Aires, where he was commissioned instructor of black soldiers.

In 1817 he applied for retirement at the rank of captain, but instead of agreeing, he was commissioned head of custody of the prison - really a concentration camp - Las Brusas, near present Dolores; anyway he was promoted to the rank of captain.

He actively participated in the disorder of the Year Anarchy XX, under the orders of Soler, Pagola and Dorrego.

In 1822 he was retired by the military reform of Bernardino Rivadavia, which damaged him greatly. He became a laborer and foreman in various jobs

He returned to the service in 1828, and at the end of that year he joined the forces of Dorrego, although it is not known whether he fought in the Battle of Navarro. The following year he was in the army of Juan Manuel de Rosas, under whose orders he fought as officer in command of an infantry battalion in the Battle of Puente de Márquez, his immediate superior was Colonel Mariano Benito Rolón.

In 1831 he was in the army in the campaign against the League of the Interior, under the orders of Juan Ramón Balcarce.

In 1833 he defended governor Balcarce from the Revolution of the Restorers. As a result, he was retired later that year, and decommissioned in 1835. During the following years he served in several offices, and served several times as a police officer in the city.

He rejoined the army in 1845 and was posted to command of a battalion of black soldiers from the city and its outskirts. He was promoted to the rank of colonel, and as such he participated in the Battle of Caseros, in which he was seriously injured. His life was saved only by chance, because the victorious army's doctors (almost all from the Rosas Army were killed) cared for non-white injured soldiers only after white soldiers had been cared for.

After serving in personal guard of the Governor Vicente López y Planes, he supported the revolution of September 11, 1852 and was elected a member of the province in October. He served with distinction in the defense against the siege of Buenos Aires with Hilario Lagos's federal troops, and he was promoted to the rank of colonel on March 1, 1853.

He was a provincial conventional constituent in 1854, the most important political office that a black man has held in Argentina. He was also, along with Lorenzo Barcala and José María Morales one of the few black colonels in Argentina's history. Also, he returned to being an elected member of the province in 1856.

His first wife was Pascuala de la Roza Contreras, who died in 1851; he then married an older woman, Petrona Mauriño, who died in 1859.

For the rest of his life he commanded a regiment of black militias, but did not fight in the Battle of Pavón, forming part of the defense of the city of Buenos Aires. He died in Buenos Aires in May 1866.

== Bibliografía ==
- Cutolo, Vicente, Nuevo diccionario biográfico argentino, 7 volúmenes, Ed. Elche, Bs. As., 1968-1985.
- Scobie, James, La lucha por la Consolidación de la Nacionalidad Argentina, Ed. Hachette, Bs. As., 1965.
- Yaben, Jacinto R., Biografías argentinas y sudamericanas, Bs. As., 1939.
