= Electronic Industries Association of India =

ELCINA
- Electronic Industries Association of India
- Electronic Industries Association of India (ELCINA) logo

- Location within India
- Formation: 1967
- Legal status: Organization
- Purpose: Promotion of Electronics hardware manufacturing ecosystem in India
- Headquarters: New Delhi
- Location: New Delhi, India
- Coordinates: 28.552096705338432°N 77.271055°E
- Website: elcina.com

Electronic Industries Association of India (ELCINA) is the oldest and largest industry association promoting the electronics hardware manufacturing ecosystem in India.

== Media gallery ==
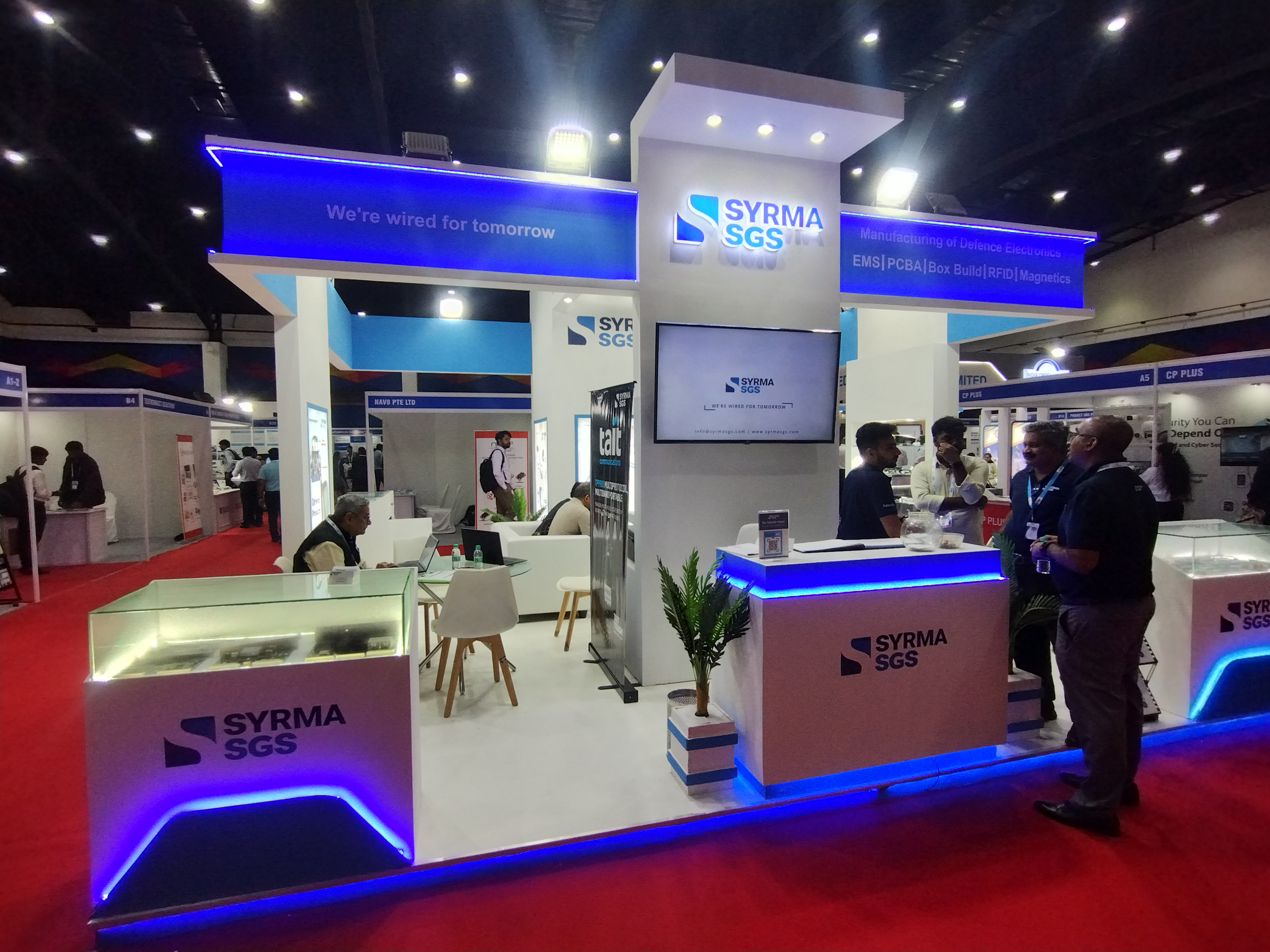
Defence & Aerospace SES 2025, an exhibition organized by ELCINA in BIEC

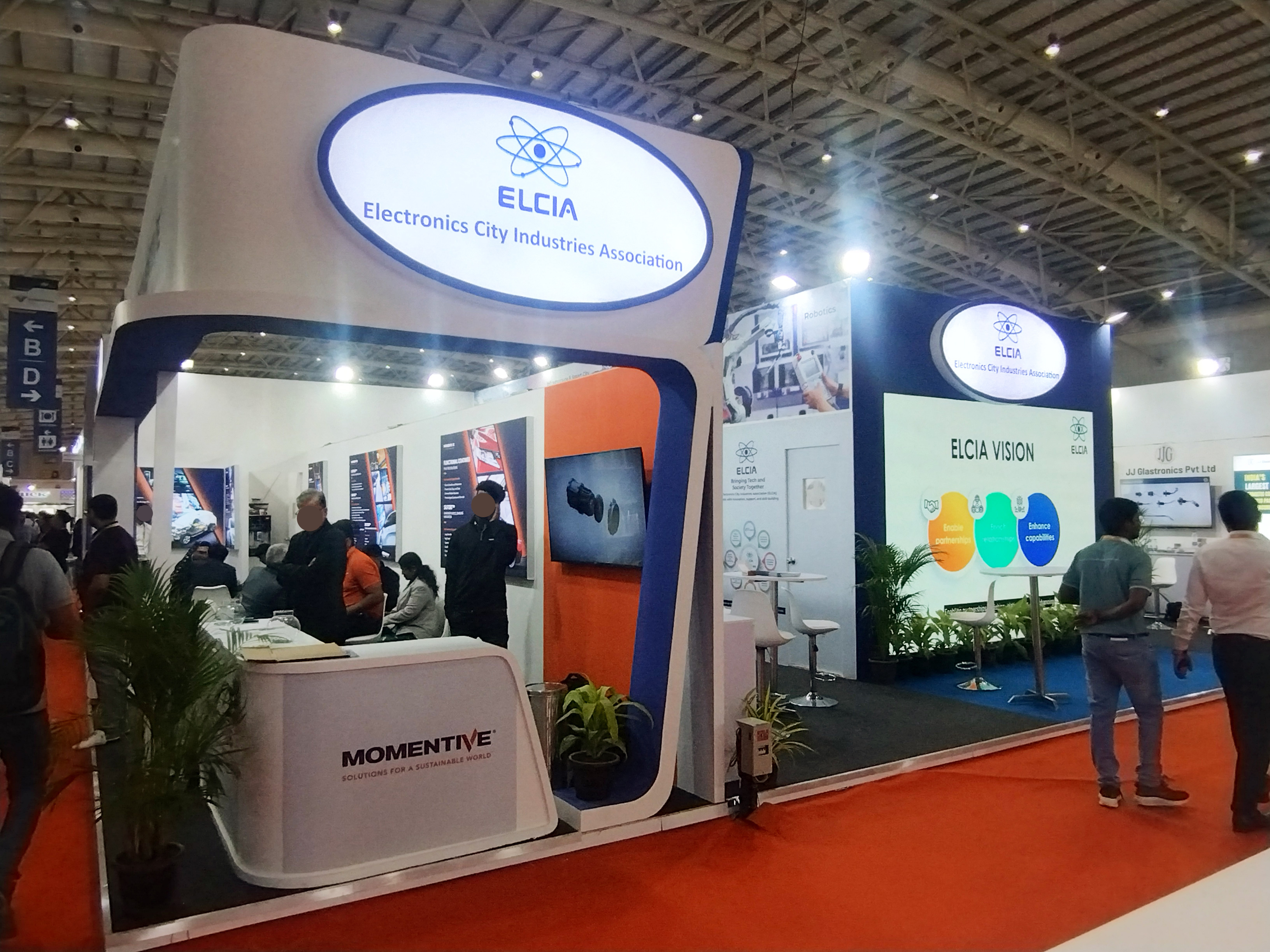
ELCINA's strategic partnerships and collaboration partner ELCIA (Electronics City Industries Association), at Electronica 2025, BIEC
