= Lorenzo Barcala =

Argentine military commander

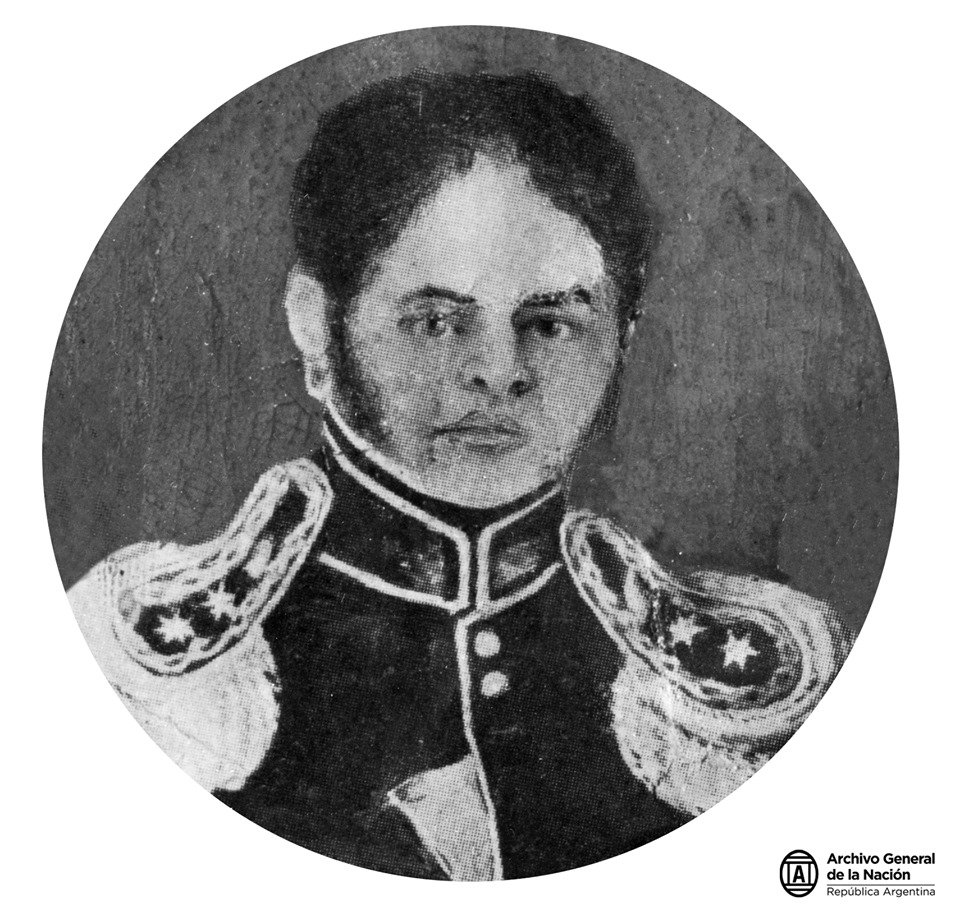

Lorenzo Barcala (1793 in Mendoza, Argentina – 1835 in Mendoza, August), was an Argentine military commander who participated in the Argentine civil wars on the side of the Unitarian Party, and one of the few black soldiers to reach the rank of colonel in that country.

== Early military career ==
The son of enslaved people, he was also enslaved person during his childhood. He was released by the governor of Cuyo, General José de San Martín, but for unknown reasons did not join the Army of the Andes. He began his military career in 1818 as a soldier of the Regiment of Pardos ("mulattoes").

In 1820 he participated in the turmoil produced by the so-called Anarquía del año 20, which had one of its epicenters in Cuyo. He was part of the army of General Bruno Moron, who fought against Chilean General José Miguel Carrera, and after the death of Moron, fought in the battle of Punta del Medano orders of José Albino Gutierrez.

In 1824 he participated in a failed attempt against Governor Gutierrez, and he fled to San Juan. Back in Mendoza, he joined Colonel Juan Lavalle's forces, who led a second uprising against Gutierrez, this time successful. Shortly afterwards he took part under the command of José Félix Aldao in the suppression of the "ecclesiastical" revolution in San Juan and the overthrow of governor Salvador María del Carril.

In 1826 Barcala joined the army that fought in the War of Brazil under the command of Colonel Ramon Bernabe Estomba and was taken prisoner, and spent several months in a prison in Rio de Janeiro, with the constant threat of being sold as a slave until he was released in a prisoner exchange.

== The Confederation League ==
Barcala joined the campaign of General José María Paz against the federal interior in 1829, and under his command he fought in the Battle of San Roque, near today's vacation city of Villa Carlos Paz. Barcala was commissioned to organize an infantry battalion of Afro-Argentines, freedom: a too expensive freedom, to be paid with many years of service in the army. He was loved by the people of African descent, especially because he denounced the humiliation and outrages what they suffered. He was a battalion commander at the battles of La Tablada, after which he was promoted to Lieutenant Colonel, and Oncativo.

After this latest victory was promoted to colonel, and sent as second in command of the occupying army of Mendoza, whose commander was José Videla Castillo. He was appointed governor and remained as chief Barcala forefront. He fought in the Battle of Rodeo Chacon as head of a wing of cavalry against the forces of Facundo Quiroga, who beat them relatively easy.

He protected his boss Videla Castillo retreating northward, where they joined General Lamadrid's forces. Lamadrid was the new commander in chief of the Confederation League. He followed this army until their final defeat at the Battle of La Ciudadela of Tucumán. After the battle, Facundo Quiroga shot most of the officers, but decided to spare the life of Barcala and appointed him chief of staff.

== Last years ==
When Quiroga retired from military activities, settling in San Juan, Barcala settled there. He couldn't settle in Mendoza because Aldao had sworn to kill him, and even tried to convince Quiroga to have him shot dead.

He joined Rosas' military campaign of 1833 against native tribes under the command of General Jose Ruiz Huidobro, and fought against the Ranqueles of chieftain Yanquetruz in the battle of Acollaradas.

Quiroga was assassinated in 1835, his lieutenants began to dispute his inheritance, and there was a series of conflicts between Aldao, Mendoza, Martín Yanzón, governor of the San Juan province, and Tomas Brizuela, of La Rioja. More independent and powerful than these, Tucuman Alejandro Heredia soon dominated the northwest. The intriguing Yanzón minister, Domingo de Oro, Aldao attempted escape by a conspiracy that led Barcala from San Juan. The plot was discovered and its leaders arrested and executed Mendoza.

After the danger, Aldao - who was not the governor, but the army chief - demanded the extradition of Barcala. Domingo de Oro, who was involved in the matter, decided to save his own life by handing Barcala over. After a trial lasting a month, Barcala was sentenced to death and shot by firing squad in Mendoza.

His son Celestino Barcala fought against the federal rebellion of 1860 and was shot by rebel commander Felipe Varela shortly before the defeat of the latter at the Battle of Pozo de Vargas.

Barcala Sr. is mentioned by Edelmiro Mayer, an Argentine officer in the Union Army, in an article he wrote for Harper's Magazine in 1863, as an example of the role played by African slave descendants in the South American independence wars and the Cisplatine War.
