= 2024 Bolivian census =

12th National census of Bolivia

Twelfth Census of Bolivia
- 23 March 2024

General information
- Country: Bolivia

Results
- Total population: 11,312,620 (▲12.5%)
- Most populous department: Santa Cruz (3,115,386)
- Least populous department: Pando (130,761)

The Twelfth Census of Bolivia is the most recent national census of Bolivia. It was conducted on 23 March 2024. The population was 11,312,620.
