= Elcina Valencia =

- Born: 27 April 1963 (age 63); Buenaventura
- Education: St Thomas Aquinas University; Universidad Santiago de Cali
- Known for: Poetry

Elcina Córdoba Valencia (born 27 April 1963) is a Colombian teacher and poet working in the Spanish language.

== Life ==
Valencia was born at Puerto Merizalde near Buenaventura in Colombia in 1963. She grew up in an agricultural area, and her parents instilled in her their love of the Spanish language. She trained and worked in education. She has both a graduate and masters qualification. She has completed post graduate work at Saint Thomas Aquinas University in Bogotá and she has computer science and education management qualifications from Universidad Santiago de Cali.

Publication of her first volume of poems was underwritten by a museum in Roldanillo in 1991. Since then she has published several other books of poetry in Spanish. She is married and has a daughter.
