= 2018 Colombian census =

Census

18th Census of Population and 7th of Housing XVIII Censo de Poblacion y VII of Vivienda
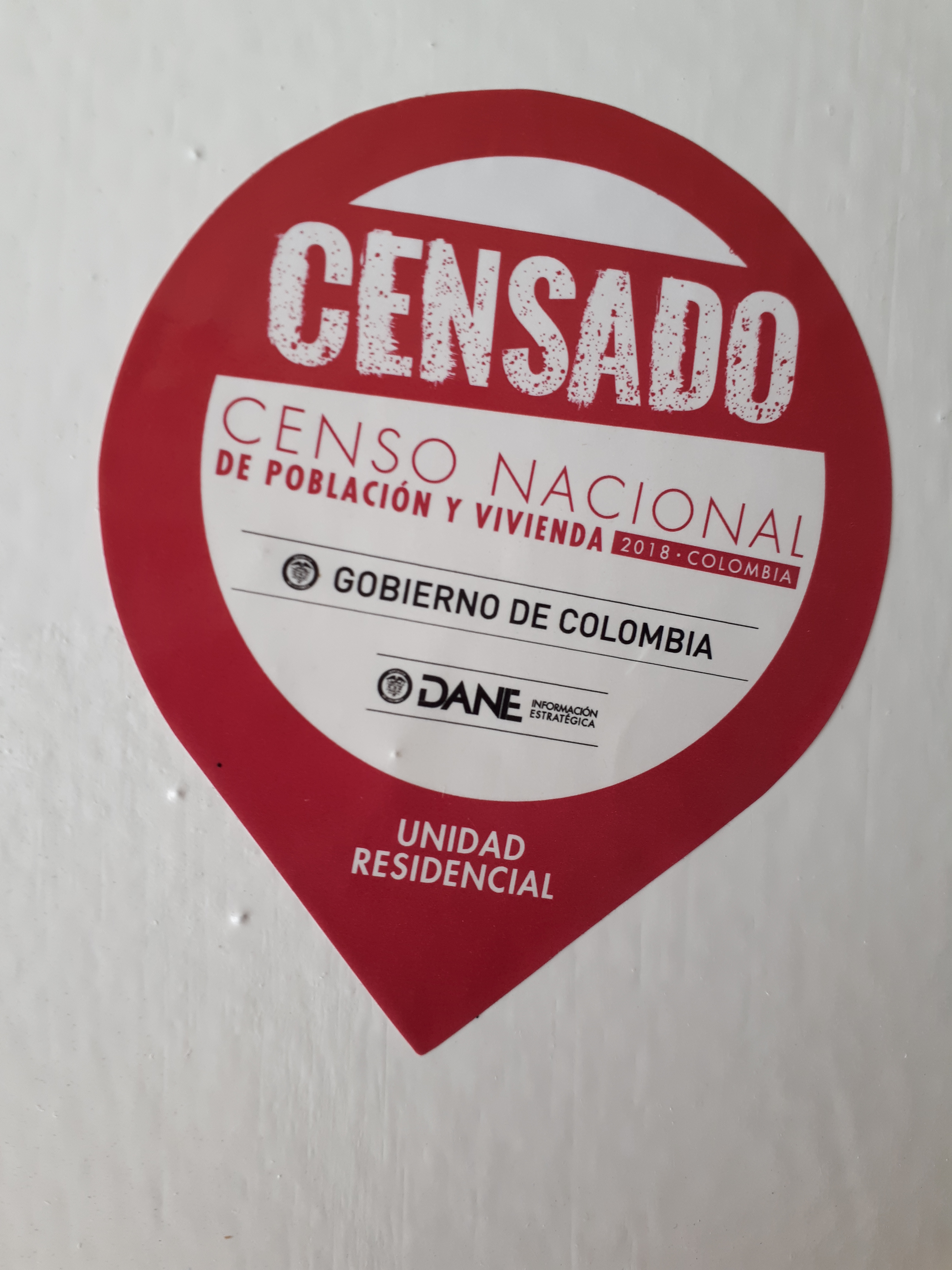
- Label for door marking of censused houses.
- Date: From January 9th to September 2018
- Location: Colombia
- Previous event: Censo de Colombia de 2005
- Next event: TBA

The 2018 Colombian Census was the 18th population census in Colombia, and the 7th to include the counting of households and dwelling units. It was developed by the National Administrative Department of Statistics (DANE) of the Republic of Colombia, whose guidelines and rules were established by Decree 1899 of November 22, 2017.

== Background and execution ==
Initially, the plan was to have several phases for the census: e-Census (virtual) from January 9 to March 8, 2018, and face-to-face visits to homes, which began in April and ended on June 30, 2018. However, due to technical difficulties with the census' virtual platform, the virtual phase was extended until April 12. In total, 5,048,492 people were counted online, and the face-to-face home visits began on April 18.

Subsequently, due to incidents with the construction of the Ituango Dam that forced the evacuation of several municipalities, the winter emergency, security problems in the Catatumbo region, and the change of government authorities, face-to-face visits to homes were extended until September 2018. Some preliminary results were released in late August, and the final results were expected to be published in the third week of September. It was finally announced that the data would become official on October 30, 2018. The second delivery of preliminary results was made on November 6, 2018. As reported by DANE, the entire process of executing the census meant interviewing 32 million people with a budget of 310 million Colombian pesos.

Prior to this census, the last population census in Colombia was the 2005 Census, which was conducted between May 22, 2005, and May 22, 2006. According to the official projections that had been made from the records of that census, the population of Colombia in 2018 was expected to be about 49,834,240 inhabitants. However, the preliminary 2018 results counted only 45.5 million people. The final census results were announced at a press conference on July 4, 2019, when DANE revealed that 4.09 million people had been left out of the preliminary count due to "a series of failures in the collection of information." DANE then released the final estimate of 48,258,499 people living in Colombia.

== Population by departments ==
Population of the departments of Colombia in 2018
N.º	Department	Urban Population	Rest of the Population	Total Population (Note: Total count of Colombian population, including the 44,164,417 of people who took the census and the 4,094,077 who were left out of the census.)
1	Cundinamarca	7,387,400	25,166	7,412,566
2	Antioquia	4,972,941	1,434,161	6,407,102
3	Valle del Cauca	3,809,542	666,344	4,475,886
4	Cundinamarca	2,090,845	828,215	2,919,060
5	Atlántico	2,404,831	130,686	2,535,517
6	Santander	1,655,627	529,210	2,184,837
7	Bolívar	1,549,063	521,047	2,070,110
8	Córdoba	937,319	847,464	1,784,783
9	Nariño	716,592	914,000	1,630,592
10	Norte de Santander	1,173,712	317,977	1,491,689
11	Cauca	545,902	918,586	1,464,488
12	Magdalena	938,320	403,426	1,341,746
13	Tolima	907,506	422,681	1,330,187
14	Boyacá	708,006	509,370	1,217,376
15	Cesar	903,411	297,163	1,200,574
16	Huila	669,697	430,689	1,100,386
17	Meta	795,061	244,661	1,039,722
18	Caldas	740,865	257,390	998,255
19	Risaralda	736,164	207,237	943,401
20	Sucre	569,089	335,774	904,863
21	La Guajira	410,636	469,924	880,560
22	Quindío	471,910	67,994	539,904
23	Chocó	243,194	291,632	534,826
24	Casanare	295,434	125,070	420,504
25	Caquetá	258,280	143,569	401,849
26	Putumayo	174,539	173,643	348,182
27	Arauca	172,634	89,540	262,174
28	Vichada	25,833	81,975	107,808
29	Guaviare	45,991	36,776	82,767
30	Amazonas	37,047	39,542	76,589
31	San Andrés y Providencia	44,893	16,387	61,280
32	Guainía	20,279	27,835	48,114
33	Vaupés	12,090	28,707	40,797
Colombia		36,424,653	11,833,841	48,258,494
Data obtained until 16 October 2019.

== Indicators ==
The main indicators registered in the 2018 General Census were the following:

Description	Figures (millions of inhabitants)	Percentage
General Population
Total Population	48.2	100.0%
Men	23.5	48.8%
Women	24.7	51.2%
Population by age
Population from 0 to 14 years old	10.8	22.5%
Population from 15 to 59 years old	26.4	54.9%
Population from 60 to 64 years old	6.4	13.4%
Population over 65 years old	4.4	9.2%
Population according to distribution by location
Municipal Centers	37.2	77.1%
Population Centers	3.4	7.1%
Rural	7.6	15.8%
Data obtained up to 5 July 2019.
Description	Figures (millions)	Percentage
Number of Households according to access to public services
Total	13.4	100.0%
Electricity	12.9	96.3%
Water supply (improved water source)	11.6	86.4%
Gas (connected to public network)	9.0	66.8%
Data obtained until 5 July 2019.

== Notes ==
Preceded by 2005 Colombian Census	Colombian Censuses; 2018	Succeeded by TBA
