= Platero (surname) =

Platero is a Spanish surname. Notable people with the surname include:

- Federico Platero (born 1991), Uruguayan footballer
- Gloria Platero, Spanish physicist
- Mario Calvo-Platero (born 1954), Italian journalist
- Matías Platero (born 1988), Argentine roller hockey player
- Oksana Platero, Ukrainian ballroom and Latin dancer
- Paul Platero (1942–2020), Navajo linguist
- Roberto Platero (born 1986), Spanish footballer
- Tomás Platero IV (1857–1925), Argentine lawyer and political activist
