= Afro-Argentines =

Argentines of Sub-Saharan African descent

Afroargentinos (Spanish)
- Proportion of Black Argentines in each department as of the 2022 Argentine census

Total population
- Sub-Saharan ancestry predominates ▲302,936 (2022 census) ▲0.66% of the Argentine population

Regions with significant populations
- Predominantly in Comuna 1, Comuna 3 and in the Argentine Northwest
- (Buenos Aires Province) Buenos Aires: 128,804
- Buenos Aires City: 40,670
- (Córdoba Province, Argentina) Córdoba: 18,366
- (Santa Fe Province) Santa Fe: 16,560
- (Salta Province) Salta: 10,632

Languages
- Majority: Spanish; Minority: Wolof · Portuguese · Haitian Creole

Religion
- Majority: Christianity (Catholicism); Minority: Islam (Sunnism) · Traditional religion

Related ethnic groups
- Sub-Saharan Africans; Black Uruguayans · Black Paraguayans · Black Chileans · Others

Afro-Argentines (Spanish: Afroargentinos), also known as Black Argentines (Spanish: Argentinos negros), are Argentines who have predominantly or total Sub-Saharan African ancestry. The Afro-Argentine population is the result of people being brought over during the transatlantic slave trade during the centuries of Spanish domination in the region and immigration.

During the 18th and 19th centuries Black Argentines accounted for up to fifty percent of the population in certain cities, and had a deep impact on Argentine culture. Some old theories held that in the 19th century the Afro-Argentine population declined sharply due to several factors, such as the Argentine War of Independence (c. 1810–1818), high infant mortality rates, low numbers of married couples who were both Afro-Argentine, the War of the Triple Alliance, cholera epidemics in 1861 and 1864 and a yellow fever epidemic in 1871. There are also Afro-Argentines descended from the small wave of Cape Verdean immigration in the 20th century.

In recent years, immigrants of Senegalese, Afro-Venezuelan, Afro-Brazilian, Afro-Uruguayan, Afro-Peruvian, Afro-American, Afro-Colombian, Afro-Ecuadorian and Afro-Caribbean origin have begun to arrive. They currently make up a large part of the country's Black population, although (with the exception of Afro-Uruguayans) they do not share close cultural or historical ties with Afro-Argentines.

Research in recent decades cites strong racial intermixing with whites and Indigenous peoples in the 18th and 19th centuries as the main reason for the decline of the Black population in Argentina.

== Importation of enslaved Africans during colonial period ==
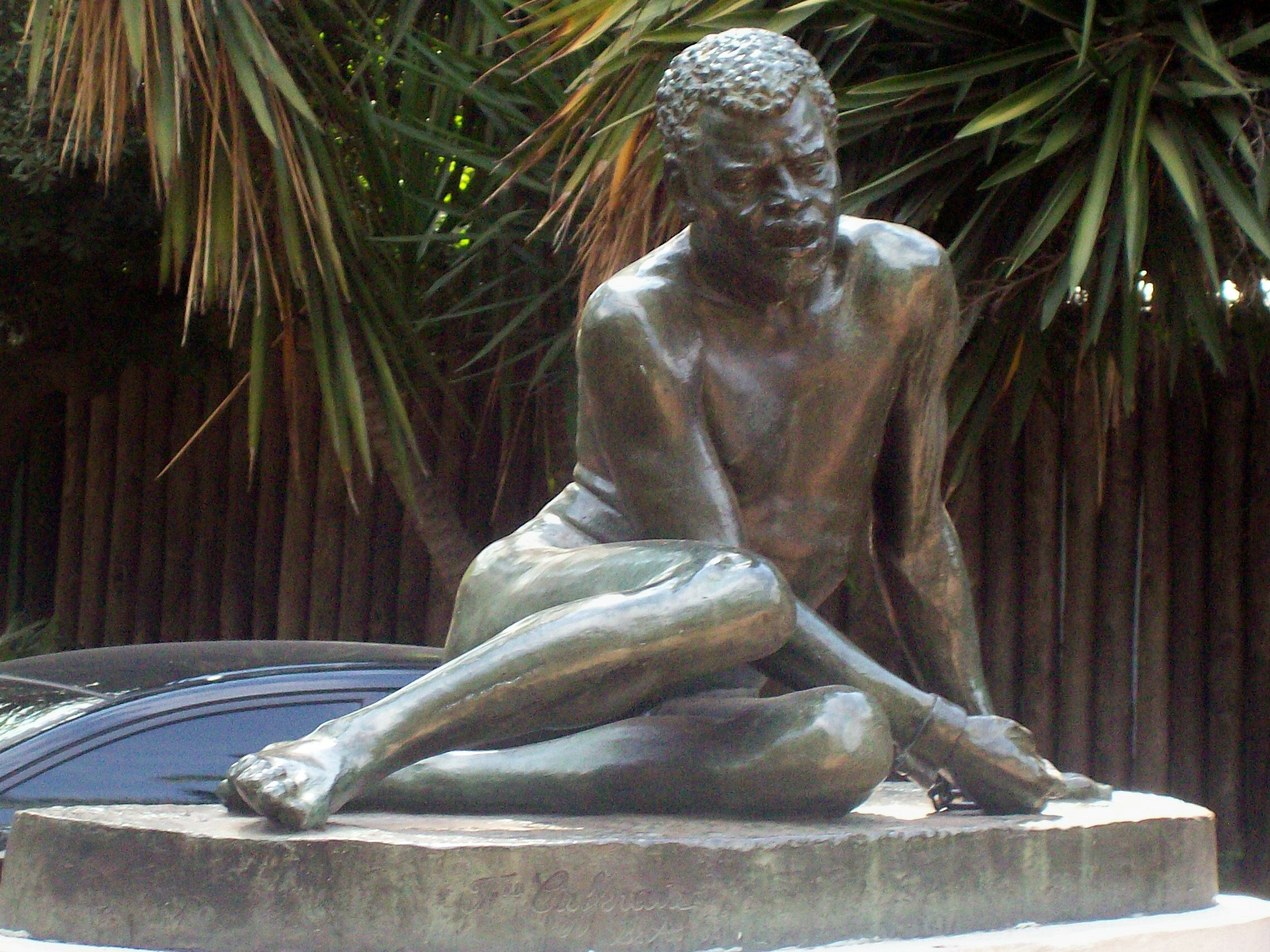
Statue of "Slavery" also known as "The Slave", Francisco Cafferata, in the Parque Tres de Febrero, Palermo, Buenos Aires, Argentina.

As part of the process of conquest, the economic regimes of the European colonies in the Americas developed various forms of forced labor exploitation of Indigenous peoples. However, the relatively low population density of some South American territories, resistance by some aboriginal groups to acculturation, and especially the high rate of mortality caused by the diseases introduced by Europeans caused the decline of the native population. Studies have shown that owing to their immunological isolation from the peoples of the Old World prior to first contacts with Europeans from 1492 onwards, some 50%–90% of the indigenous population throughout the Americas died from epidemic diseases, exacerbated by the stresses brought on by violent conquest, dispossession and exploitation. This led the Spaniards to supplement aboriginal manpower with slaves from West and Central Africa.

Well into the 19th century, mining and agriculture accounted for the bulk of economic activity in the Americas. African slave labor held the advantage of having already been exposed to European diseases through geographical proximity, and African laborers readily adapted to the tropical climate of the colonies. In the case of Argentina, the influx of African slaves began in the colonies of the Rio de la Plata in 1588. European slave traders purchased African slaves, who were then shipped from West Africa across the Atlantic to the Americas and the Caribbean. The slave trade flourished through the port of Buenos Aires, where thousands of African slaves arrived to be sold, and to be sent mostly to Brazil as part of a slave-smuggling network. To provide slaves to the East Indies, the Spanish crown granted contracts known as Asientos to various slave trading companies from Spain and other European nations. However, in Argentina and Uruguay—unlike in other territories of the Viceroyalty—enslaved people were primarily assigned to domestic tasks, as the intensive cultivation that characterized the central and northern parts of the South American continent and the Caribbean did not take place in the Southern Cone.

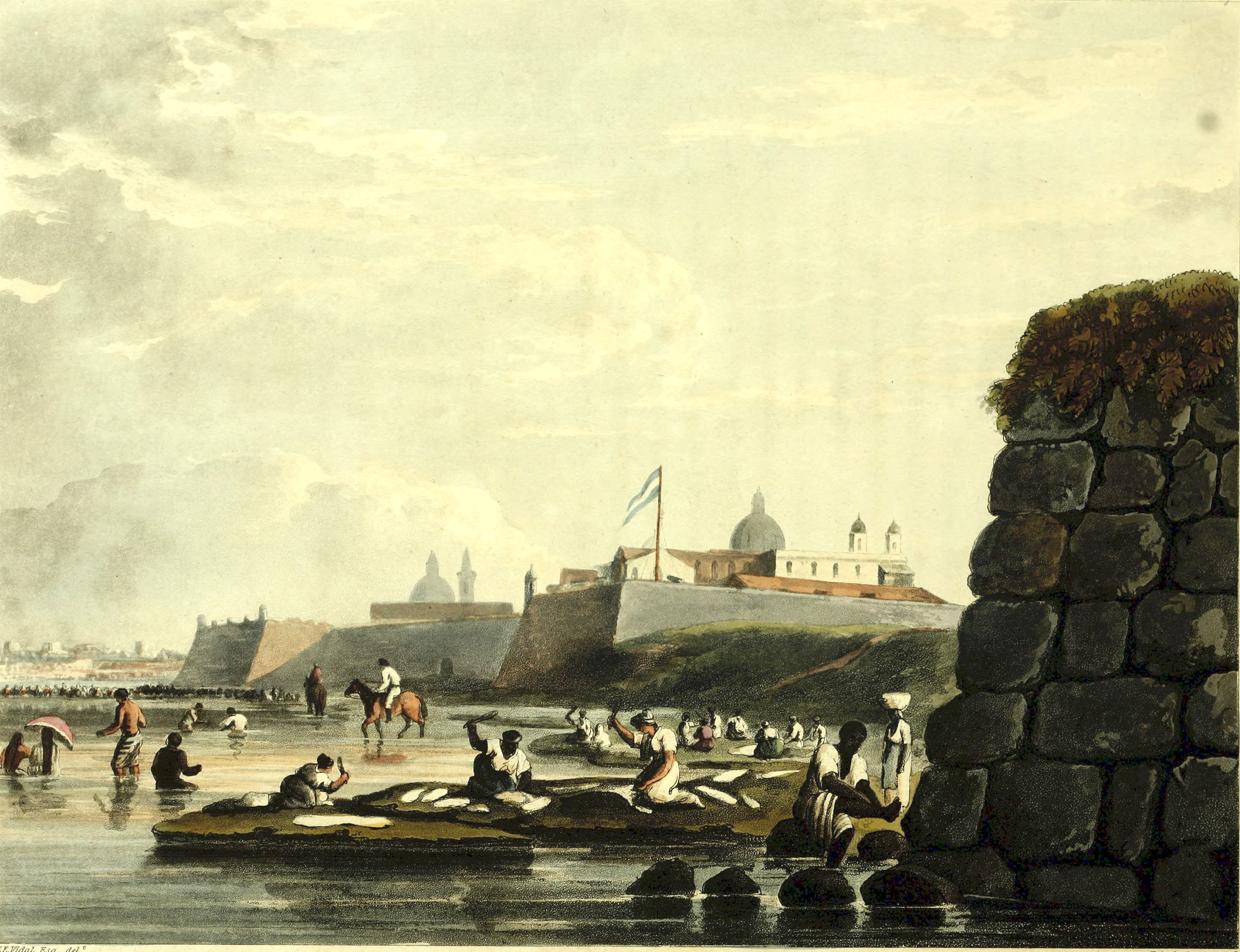
In the background is the citadel, flying the newly designed Argentine flag. In the foreground Afro-Argentine women are washing clothes in the river.

Before the 16th century, slaves had arrived in relatively small numbers from the Cape Verde islands. Thereafter the majority of Africans brought to Argentina were from ethnic groups speaking Bantu languages, from the territories now comprising Angola, the Democratic Republic of the Congo and the Republic of the Congo (largely Bakongo and Mbundu people). Relatively few Yoruba and Ewe were taken to Argentina; larger numbers of these groups were taken to Brazil.

The Buenos Aires neighborhoods of San Telmo and Monserrat housed a large quantity of slaves, although most were sent to the interior provinces. The 1778 census conducted by Juan José de Vértiz y Salcedo showed very high concentrations of Black people (though largely the product of varying degrees of racial mixing with white and Indigenous people) in cities located in regions where agricultural production was greatest: 54% in Santiago del Estero, 52% in San Fernando del Valle de Catamarca, 46% in Salta, 44% in Córdoba, 44% in San Miguel de Tucumán, 24% in Mendoza, 20% in La Rioja, 16% in San Juan, 13% in San Salvador de Jujuy and 9% in San Luis, as well as smaller percentages in other cities and towns. For example, one of the currently rich neighbourhoods of the city of Corrientes is still known as "Camba Cuá", from the Guarani kamba kua, meaning "cave of the Black people".

== Black people in the independence and early history of Argentina ==
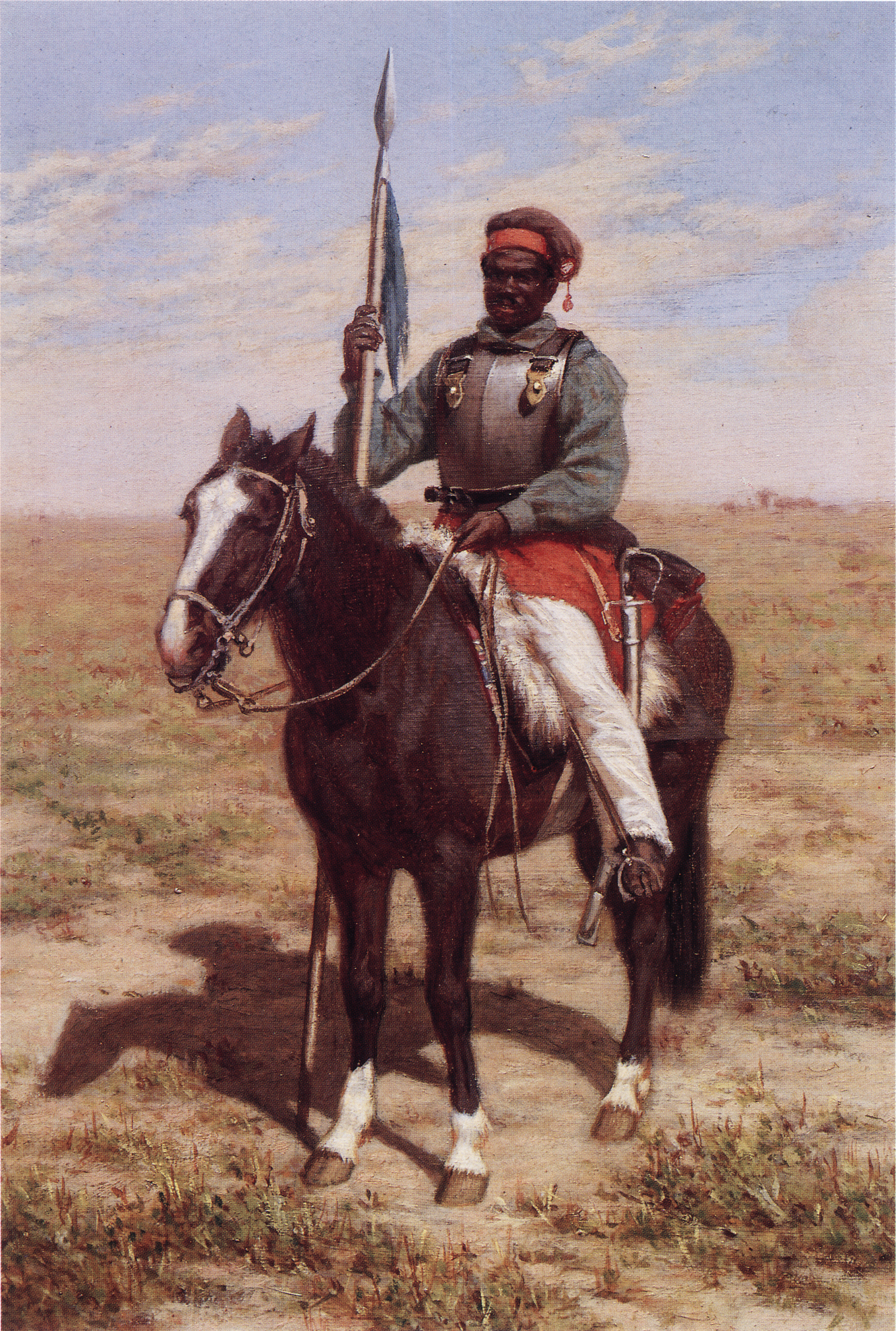
An Afro-Argentine lancer from Rivera, Argentina (19th century).

In 1801 the first Afro-Argentine militias were organised, under the auspices of the Compañía de Granaderos de Pardos libres de Buenos Aires and Compañía de Granaderos de Morenos libres de Buenos Aires. The pardos were free people of mixed European, African, and Native American, particularly Guaraní, descent, whereas the "morenos" seem to have been composed of soldiers of largely African ancestry. These forces were unified into the Batallón de Pardos y Morenos, also known as the Batallón Castas, at a strength of nine companies, plus four auxiliary slave companies, at the time of the first British invasion of the River Plate. Regimental status was gained in 1810, and the new Regimento de Pardos y Morenos participated in the Argentine War of Independence.

In 1812, Argentine politician Bernardo de Monteagudo was not allowed as a member of the First Triumvirate, due to his "questionable mother"—i.e., African ancestry. Bernardino Rivadavia, also of African descent, was one of the politicians barred from joining the triumvirate. The Assembly of the Year XIII, called to establish the new independent state of Argentina, passed the law of freedom of wombs—whereby children born to slaves thenceforth were automatically free citizens—but did not free those who were already slaves. Many Black people were part of militias and irregular troops that eventually became part of the Argentine Army, but mostly in segregated squadrons. Black slaves could, however, ask to be sold and even find a buyer if they were unhappy with their owners.

Forty years on from the 1813 establishment of freedom of wombs, in 1853, slavery was completely abolished. However, after the abolition of slavery, many Black people faced widespread discrimination. Only two of the fourteen schools in Buenos Aires in 1857 admitted Black children, although 15% of students that year were Black. In Córdoba in 1829, Black children were entitled to only two years' secondary schooling, while white Argentine children studied for four years. Universities did not admit Black people until 1853, when slavery was abolished by the constitution.

Black people began to publish newspapers and to organize for their rights. In 1877 one paper, The Unionist, published a declaration of equal rights and justice for all people regardless of skin color. One of its statements read:

The Constitution is a dead letter and the Counts and Marquises abound who, following the old and odious colonial regime, intend to treat their subordinates as slaves, without understanding that among the men they humiliate there are many who hide under their coarse clothes an intelligence superior to that of the people who subjugate them.

Other newspapers were The African Race, the Black Democrat and The Proletarian, all published in 1858. By the 1880s there were about 20 such Black-published newspapers in Buenos Aires, and some researchers consider these social movements integral to the introduction of socialism and the idea of social justice in Argentine culture.

Some Black Argentines entered politics. José María Morales and Domingo Sosa were in action as senior military officers and held significant political posts.

== Decline of the Afro-Argentine population ==
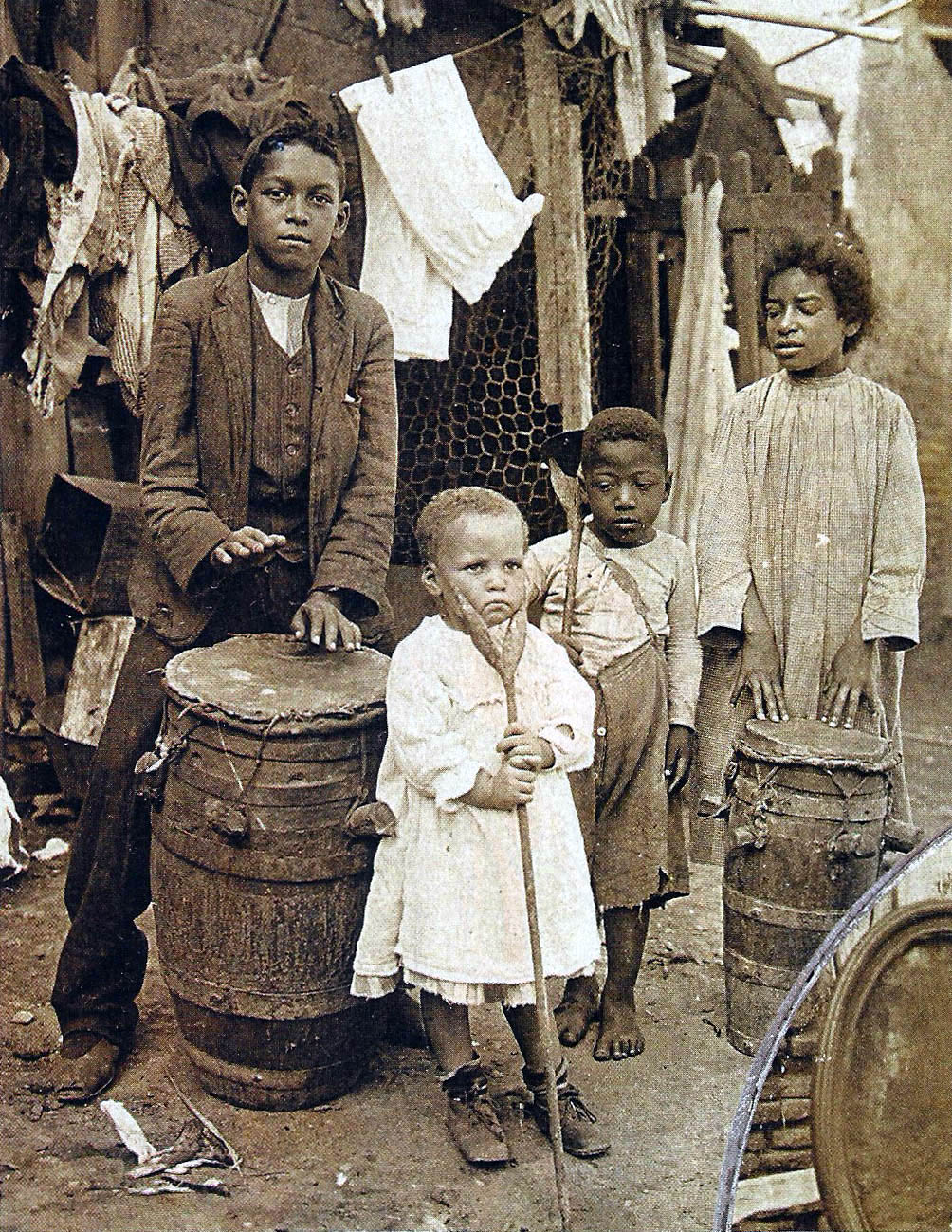
Afro-Argentine family of Buenos Aires, 1908

In recent decades, theories have been disputed over the causes of the decline in the Afro-Argentine population. Older theories alleged a genocide as the main factor. Among the causes expressed are the supposed high mortality of Black soldiers in the wars of the 19th century (the theory goes that Black soldiers were a disproportionately high number within the armed forces, and that this was planned by the governments of the time) and in a yellow fever epidemic in 1871 that affected the south of the city of Buenos Aires, as well as mass emigration to Uruguay (due to the fact that there would have been a larger Black population and a more favorable political climate).

Research in recent decades has ruled out such theories. Although it is true that Black people made up an important part of the armies and militias of the 19th century, they were not the majority, nor did their number differ much from that of Indigenous and white people, even in the lower ranks (the so-called cannon fodder). Demographic studies also do not support the view that the yellow fever epidemics that affected Buenos Aires (especially the most lethal, which was that of 1871) had a big effect—on the contrary, they show that the most affected were recent European immigrants living in poverty—and, furthermore, this theory does not explain the decline of the Black population in the rest of Argentina.

The most widely accepted theory today is that the Black population gradually decreased over the generations due to mixture with whites and, to a lesser extent, Indigenous peoples, which occurred frequently from the 18th century in the colonial period, and accelerated even more in the late 19th century (in the already independent Argentina) with the arrival of the massive immigration wave from Europe and the Middle East.

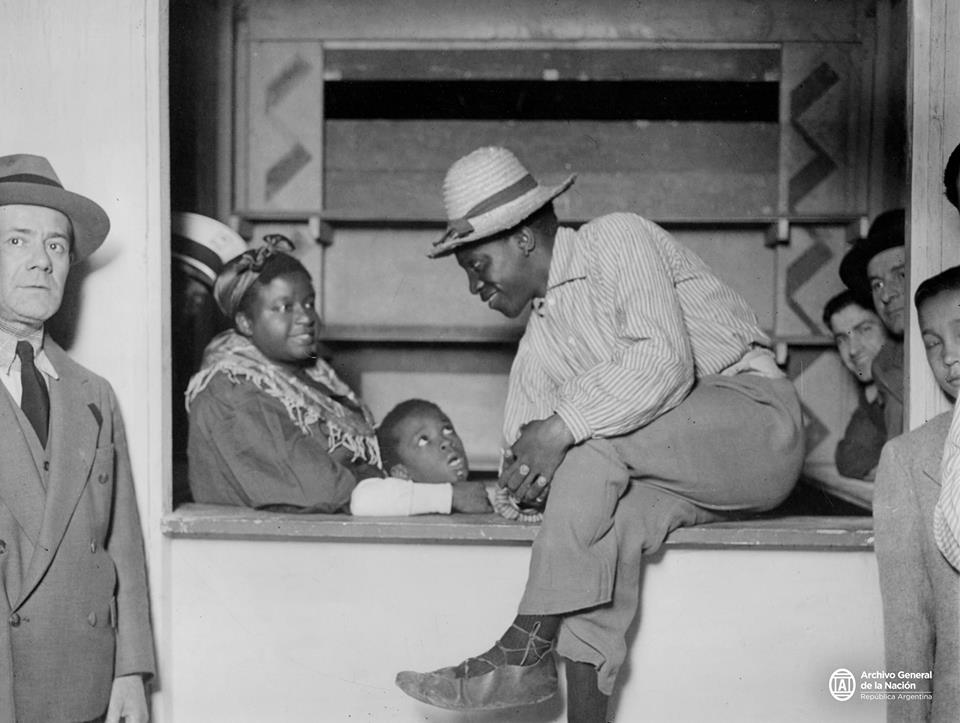
Empanada stall run by its owner, Buenos Aires 1937.

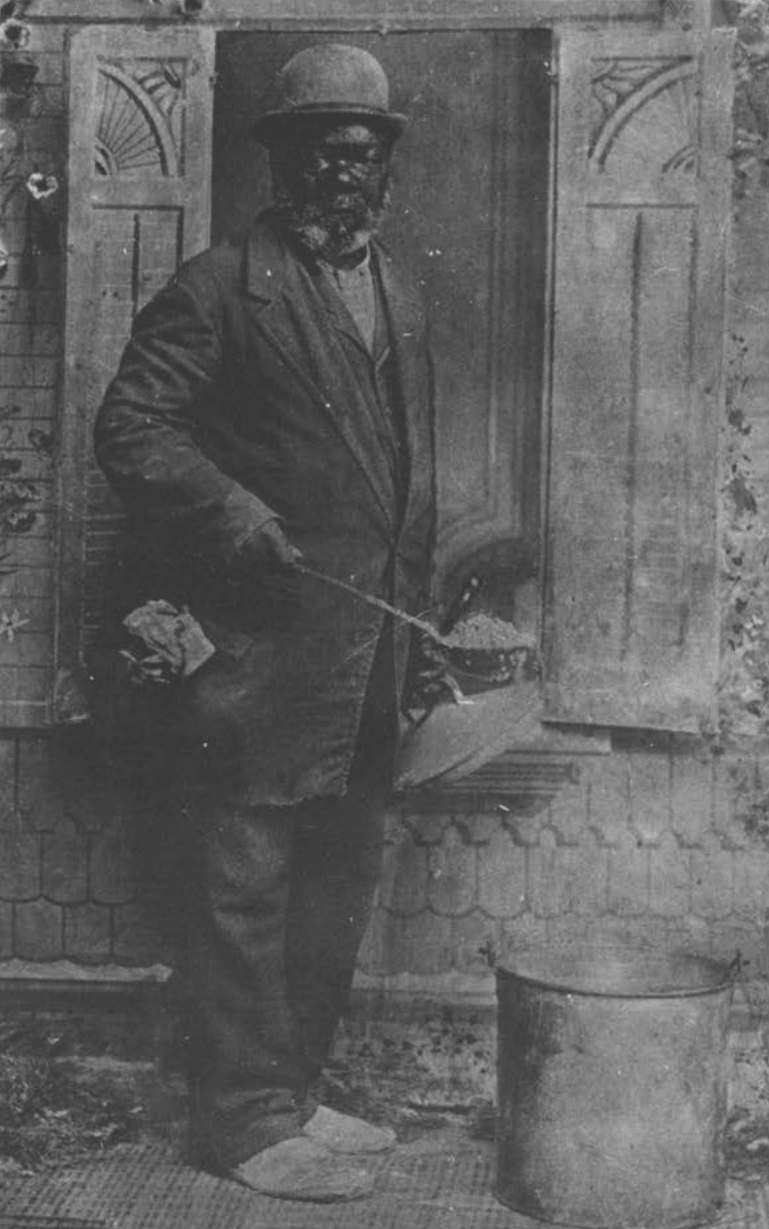
Black Argentine street vendor specializing in mazamorra, circa 1900.

Unlike other regions of the Americas, where there was strict, violent segregation of non-whites in an attempt to prevent racial mixing, the Argentine elite thought that non-white offspring could be improved through genetic mixing with whites (Blanqueamiento). The exception, since the mid-19th century, were those non-whites who still lived in tribal societies that were not part of Argentine culture and were not under the control of the government. Several local Indigenous nations often had conflicts with the government (others, meanwhile, were becoming assimilated into the country's society), and were thus seen as incorrigible savages, an obstacle to progress and a threat to the nation. This led to wars against them (like the Conquest of the Desert) that in some cases ended with genocides or mass murders, along with the colonization of their lands.

In late colonial times racial mixing was common because, despite prevailing racism, the level of segregation and violence towards non-whites who were part of colonial society in the territories of modern Argentina was less than that in other European colonies in the Americas and other Spanish colonial regions where a greater intensity of slave labor was required (such as mining enclaves or large agricultural estates in tropical regions). For this reason, there was less mistreatment towards slaves, who also had greater freedom to circulate, especially those who worked in the fields, where labor associated with livestock and extensive farming was fundamentally required. It was also more common for slaves in Argentina to be able to buy their freedom, so even several decades before the abolition of slavery, it was in clear decline.

On the other hand, due to the association of Blackness with barbarism, by the final decades of the 18th century, Black people (who by then normally had a certain level of racial mixture and therefore lighter skin than most slaves recently arrived from Africa and fewer typical features of the race), according to their degree of freedom or good relationship with their masters or white social environment, gradually came to be considered in censuses and legal documents in ambiguous pseudo-racial categories (beneficial to them) such as those of pardos and trigueños (which also included Indigenous people who were part of colonial society and even whites with a high level of racial admixture). This was an attempt by the authorities to detach them from their slave past and, theoretically, make them easier to assimilate into the modern society that the authorities intended to create (according to their eurocentrist vision). It allowed those already mixed-race Black people to attain a better social position and a greater degree of freedom by moving away from their original racial category. In other cases, also due to their ambiguous phenotype, several tried to be recorded as Indians (if they could explain their indigenous ancestry) because this would allow them to obtain freedom, since the enslavement of Indigenous peoples of the Americas had been prohibited in Spanish colonies since the 16th century by the New Laws and the Laws of the Indies (such enslavement still happened illegally, but was much less frequent than the enslavement of Africans and their descendants, which was permitted). There were even cases of Black women with a high degree of racial mixture who managed to be noted as señoras or doñas (categories reserved only for white women) with the help of white people from their environment (for example, couples).

These situations led Black people to prefer to form families with white and Indigenous people in order to have children who had lighter skin and features more distant from the natives of Sub-Saharan Africa; this increased their level of racial admixture and, therefore, resulted in a decline in the visibly Black population, which lasted strongly even after the abolition of slavery, since people with lighter skin continued to rule society and make up the majority of the elite, thus leaving dark skin idiosyncratically associated with poverty in Argentina.

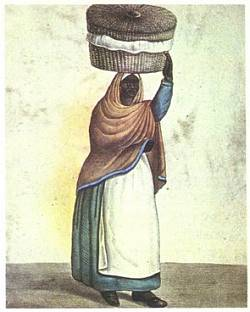
An Afro-Argentine vendor by César Hipólito Bacle (1784–1838)

The aforementioned classification of an increasing number of non-whites (especially those who had at least some racial admixture) into new ambiguous pseudo-racial categories, devised by authorities from the final years of the colonial period as a method to move them from their original racial identities (negros and indios) in an attempt to make them more assimilable within the modern society the elites sought to create, was the first part of the whitening, known as the lightening, in which non-whites were moved gradually into categories that were closer to "white", which was more desirable. Also, the white elite, which was a minority in most places until the mid-19th century, used this as a way to mark a difference between "us" and "them", allowing many people to "leave" their undesirable original categories, but at the same time preventing them from being labeled as whites (since in certain cases they appeared more white than Indigenous or Black) to deny them access to the power and privileges reserved for a minority.

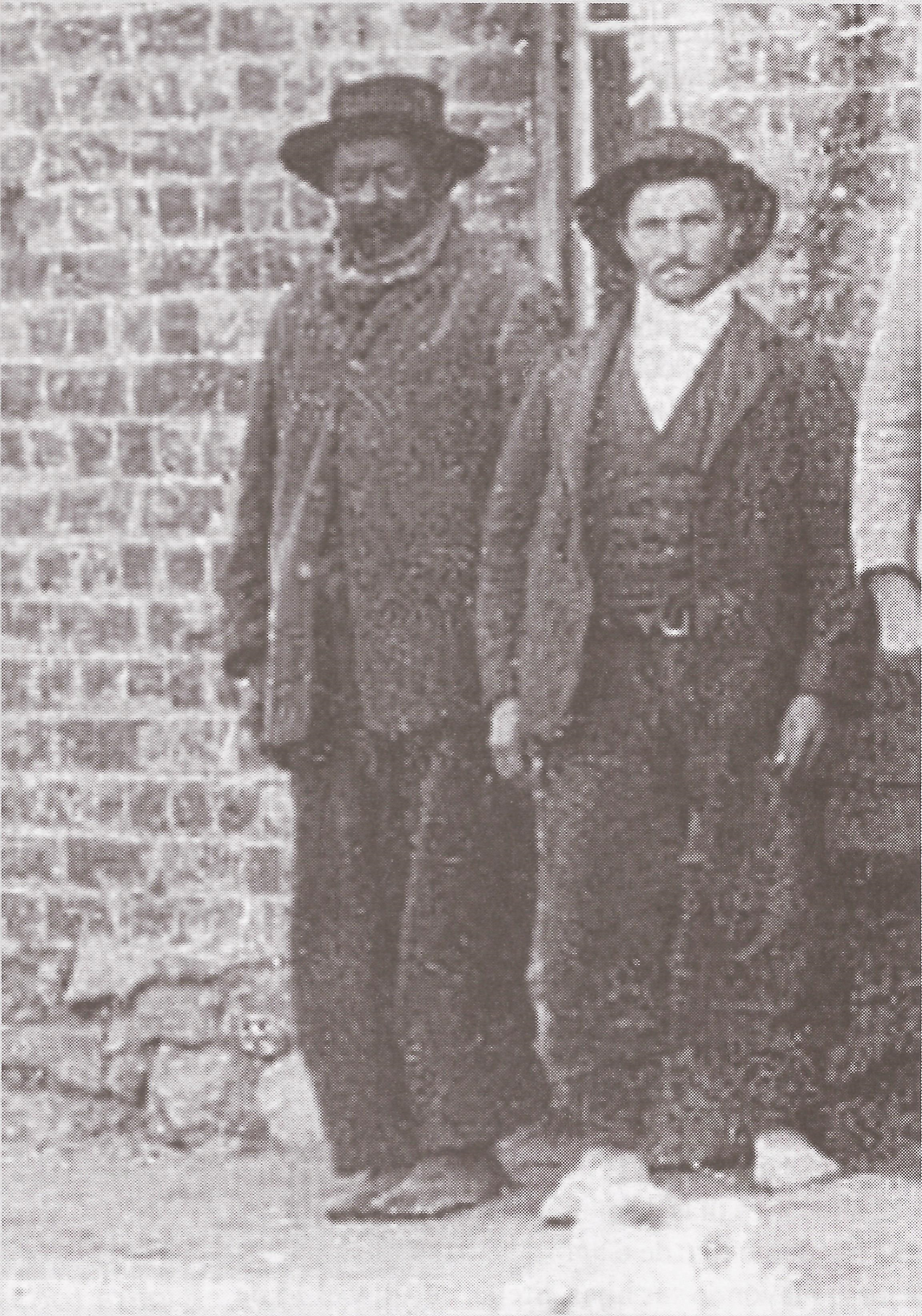
In Comodoro Rivadavia, two Boer colonists were said to have brought Zulu slaves. Damboy was said to have been a slave in South Africa, but in Argentina he became a rural worker.

In this way, terms such as morochos or criollos (which expanded its original colonial meaning, which referred only to whites of Spanish descent born in the Americas) came to be used to catalog the vast majority of the population that was not clearly white (or whites descended from Spaniards from the colonial period, in the case of criollos), which would later play into the narrative of the disappearance of Indigenous and Black people in the country. The very people belonging to these races (which were already heavily racially mixed, especially in the case of Black people) actively sought to identify with the new categories since they were symbolically closer to whiteness, which brought more benefits and less discrimination. Only Black people with dark skin were considered Black, and being a minority even within the Argentine Black population itself, they were considered as isolated cases or foreigners (since, from the late 19th century, several of them were free African immigrants who had arrived recently, mainly from Cape Verde). In the case of Indigenous people, only those who were part of the Indigenous nations that still survived (who represented a small minority) came to be considered as such, but not those who were part of the majority non-Indigenous Argentine society.

In 1887 the official percentage of the Black population was calculated at 1.8% of the total. Racial categories were not registered in subsequent censuses. From then on, and for almost a century, in Argentina practically no studies were carried out on Black Argentines.

== Present ==
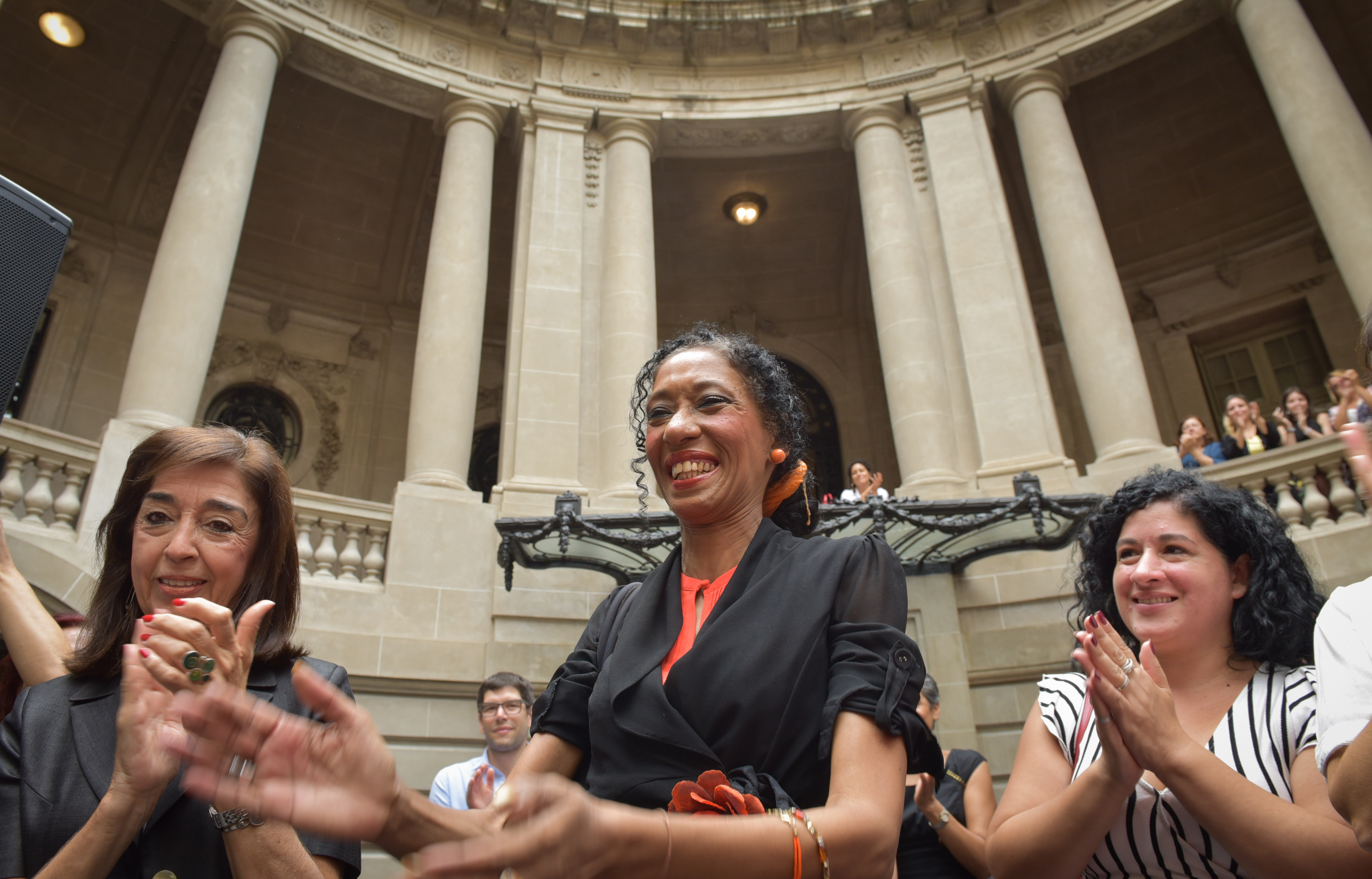
María Fernanda Silva, of Cape Verdean descent, became the first Afro-Argentine ambassador in 2020, when she was appointed as ambassador to the Holy See.

Today in Argentina, the Afro-Argentine community is beginning to emerge from the shadows. There have been Black organizations such as "Grupo Cultural Afro," "SOS Racismo," and perhaps the most important group "Africa Vive," founded by Pocha Lamadrid, that help to rekindle interest in the African heritage of Argentina. There are also Afro-Uruguayan and Afro-Brazilian immigrants who have helped to expand the country's African culture. After 1887, it would be well over a century before Argentina asked about African racial ancestry in its census count. Therefore, calculating the exact number of Afro-descendants is very difficult; however, Africa Vive calculates that there are about 1,000,000 partially Afro-descendants in Argentina. The census carried out on 27 October 2010 was the first since 1887 to ask about African ancestry. Still, as in other Latin American nations, Argentines of Black African background may not always identify as Afro-Argentine, due to pervasive negative connotations associated with Blackness and the lack of historical records of Black bloodlines in Argentina.

The Forum of African Descent and Africans in Argentina was created on 9 October 2006, with the aim of promoting social and cultural pluralism and the fight against discrimination of a population in the country which could reach two million inhabitants.

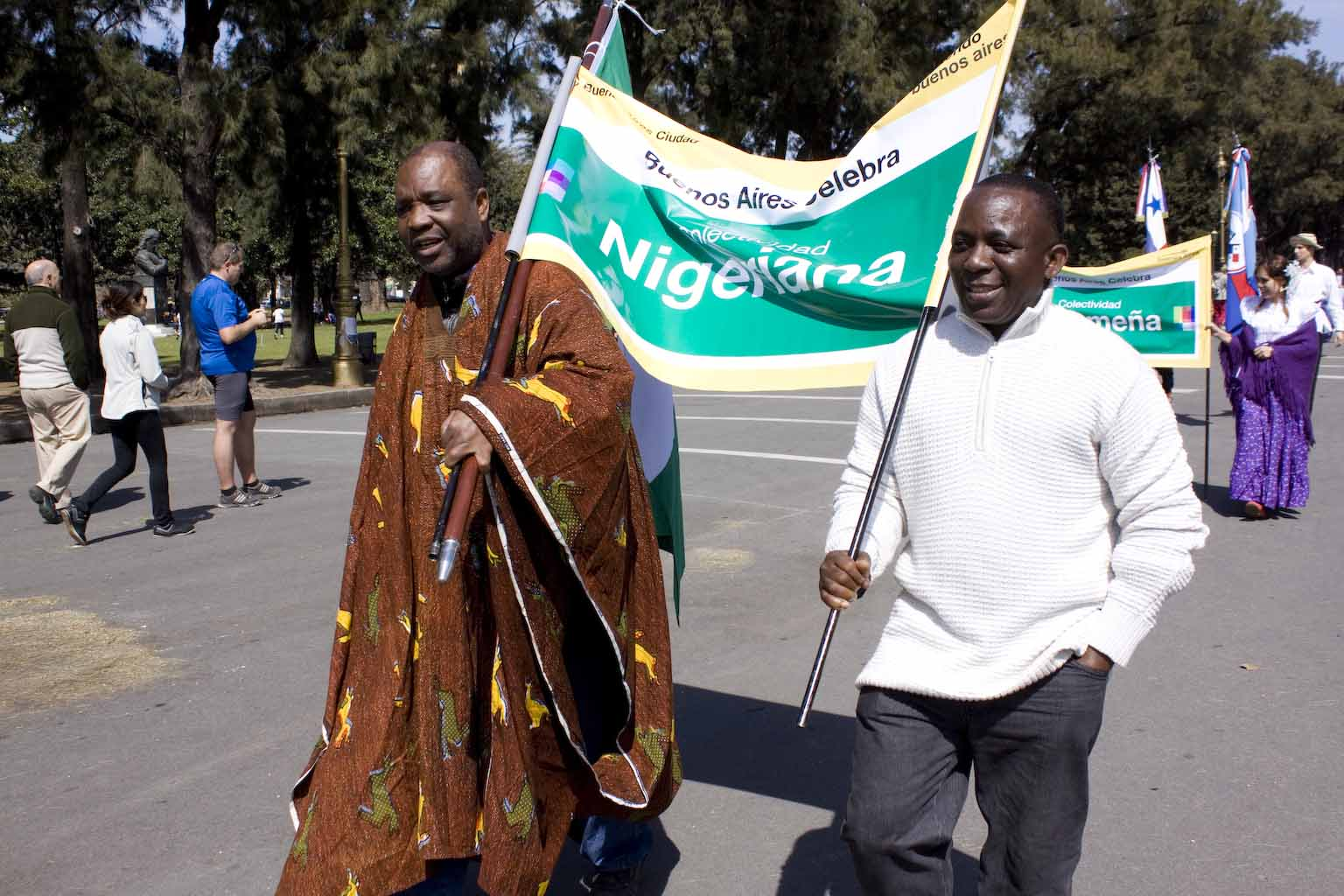
Nigerian immigrants during Day of the immigrants in Buenos Aires.

There is currently a small wave of immigrants from West Africa (mainly from Senegal) that began in the 1990s. There is a minority of Black people among immigrants from countries in the Americas from where immigration has taken place since before the middle of the 20th century (such as Peru, Uruguay and, to a lesser extent, Brazil); greater numbers of Black people have come from other countries (such as Colombia, Venezuela, the Dominican Republic, Ecuador and Haiti) beginning in the 21st century.

Since 2013, 8 November has been celebrated as the National Day of Afro-Argentines and African Culture. The date was chosen to commemorate the recorded date for the death of María Remedios del Valle, a rabona and guerrilla fighter, who served with the Army of the North in the War of Independence.

The National Institute Against Discrimination (INADI) was the public body responsible for combating discrimination and racism. In 2021, the Argentine government announced the establishment of an "Afro-Argentine Community Federal Advisor Council" made up of prominent Afro-Argentine activists and scholars.

== Demographics ==
Black Argentines 1778–2022
Year	Population	% of Argentina
1778	68,465	36.82%
2010	149,493	▼0.37%
2022	302,936	▲0.66%
Source: Argentina census INDEC.

Population pyramid of Black Argentines in 2022

According to the Argentine national census of 2010, the total population of Argentines was 40,117,096, of whom 149,493 (0.37%) identified as Afro-Argentine. However, autosomal DNA research indicates that a much larger portion of the population have some degree of Sub-Saharan African ancestry, with estimates ranging 4% to 9%. World Bank and Argentine government estimates have suggested the Argentine population with significant African ancestry could number over 2 million, the vast majority of whom are multiracial people.

Despite the fact that in the 1960s it was calculated that Argentina owed two-thirds of the volume of its population to European immigration, over 5% of Argentines state that they have at least one Black ancestor, and a further 20% state they do not know whether or not they have any Black ancestors. Genetic studies carried out in 2005 showed that the average level of African genetic contribution in the population of Buenos Aires is 2.2%, but that this component is concentrated in 10% of the population who display notably higher levels of African ancestry. Today there is still a notable Afro-Argentine community in the Buenos Aires districts of San Telmo and La Boca. There are also quite a few African-descended Argentines in the cities of Merlo and Ciudad Evita in the Buenos Aires metropolitan area.

Immigrants from countries of primarily Sub-Saharan descent in Argentina, according to the 2022 Argentine census:

Position	Country	Population
1	Haiti (Including whites)	1,524
2	Senegal	1,120
3	South Africa (Including whites)	322
4	Angola (Including whites)	177
5	Nigeria	123
6	Ghana	103

=== Immigrants from Angola ===
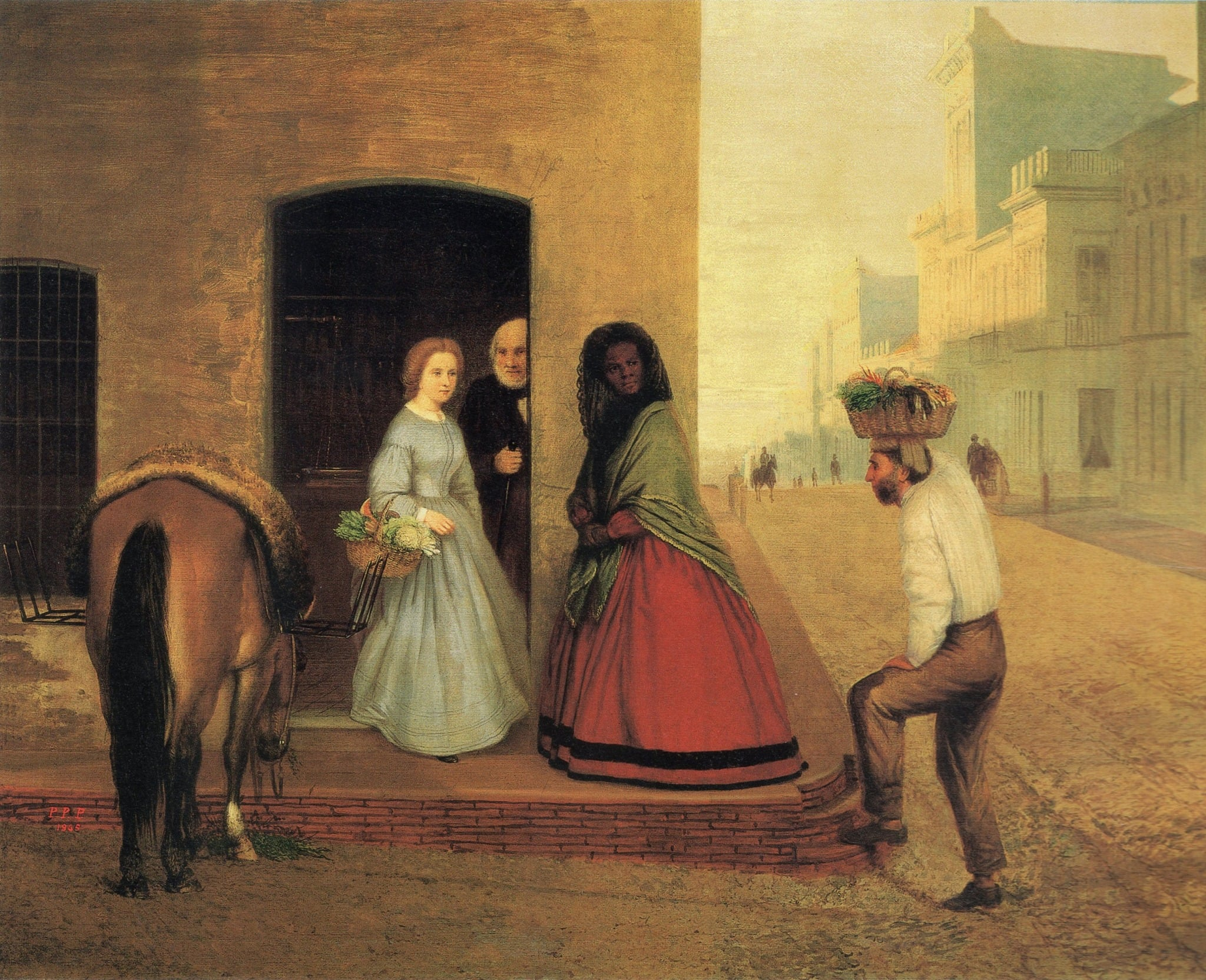
Esquina porteña, an 1865 painting by Prilidiano Pueyrredón.

There are around 100,000 descendants of Angolan immigrants in Argentina; according to the 2022 census there are 177 people born in Angola living in Argentina.

In 1680–1777 at least 40,000 slaves were brought to the region, while between the latter date and 1812, when trafficking was halted, some 70,000 were landed in Buenos Aires and Montevideo (to which figure must be added another, unknown, quantity of slaves brought overland from Rio Grande do Sul). Twenty-two percent of these slaves came directly from Sub-Saharan Africa—specifically Congo and Angola. Many more than these had been taken from Africa but one in five, on average, died on the boats.

Later, the May Revolution banned the slave trade and then sanctioned the freedom of wombs, but did not abolish slavery, as leaders favored the rights of owners over granting freedom to enslaved people. It is currently believed that among the Black population of Argentina, those of predominantly Angolan ancestry form the largest group; the majority originate from the cities of Cabinda, Luanda and Benguela.

=== Immigrants from Cape Verde ===
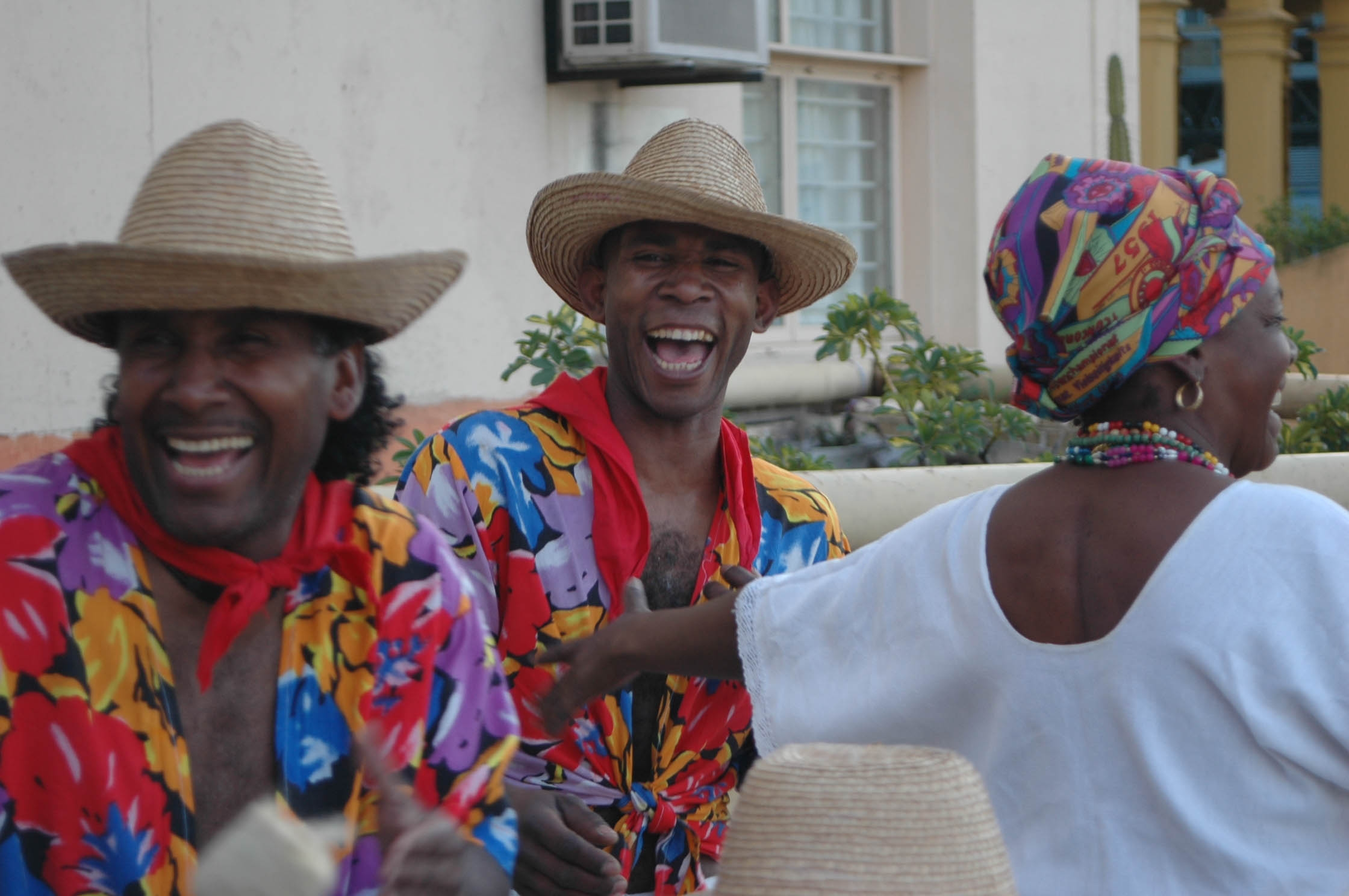
Cape Verdean Argentines in Buenos Aires (2012).

Between 12,000 and 15,000 descendants of immigrants from Cape Verde live in Argentina, of whom about 300 are native to the African continent.

This immigration began in the late 19th century and became important from the 1920s. The busiest periods were between 1927 and 1933 and after 1946. These migrations were mainly due to droughts in Cape Verde that caused famine and death.

Cape Verdean immigrants were expert sailors and fishermen, which is why most places settled in ports such as Rosario, Buenos Aires, San Nicolás, Bahía Blanca, Ensenada and Dock Sud. Ninety-five percent of them got jobs in the military navy, the merchant navy, the fluvial fleet of Argentina and the YPF dockyards or the Empresa Líneas Marítimas Argentinas.

=== Immigrants from Dominican Republic ===
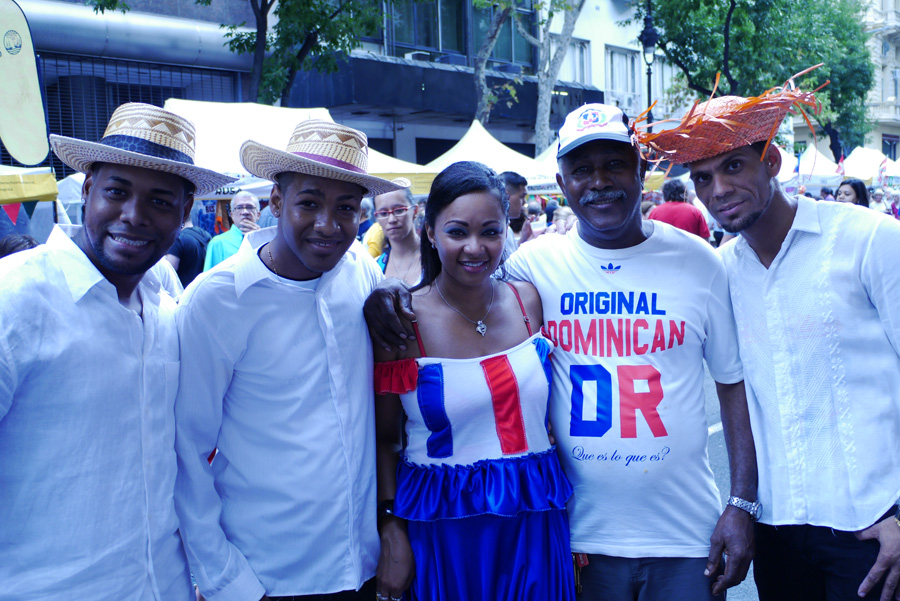
Afro-Dominican Folkloric Dance Group in Buenos Aires.

From the early 1990s until the 2001 economic crisis, as a result of a peso-dollar conversion policy, there was a wave of migration from poor countries to Argentina to work, earn high wages in dollars, and return to their countries of origin with a significant amount of savings. As a result, Black and Mixed Dominican women began arriving, many of them to work as prostitutes, either voluntarily or having fallen prey to human trafficking.

More of this type of immigrant began to arrive in 2008: applications from Dominican women to settle in the country increased from 663 in 2007 to 1,168 in 2008, according to statistics from the Immigration Office. Authorities implemented controls to uncover fake tourists and combat the mafias that brought them in. Thus, in April 2009, some 166 Dominican women were rejected and returned to their country. Today there are 10,324 Dominican immigrants.

=== Immigrants from South Africa ===
South African immigration to Argentina was mainly Afrikaners (Boers), who settled in the province of Chubut, mainly in the city of Sarmiento. Most left South Africa following the Second Anglo-Boer War as many had lost their farms in the war or regarded themselves as Bittereinders who felt they could not live under a British government. According to the 2022 census, 0.9% of the population of Chubut and 0.7% of the population of Rio Negro are of African descent, almost all of them descendants of South African settlers.

=== Other immigrants from Africa ===
==== In Buenos Aires ====
Population of Black people in Greater Buenos Aires according to the 2022 census.

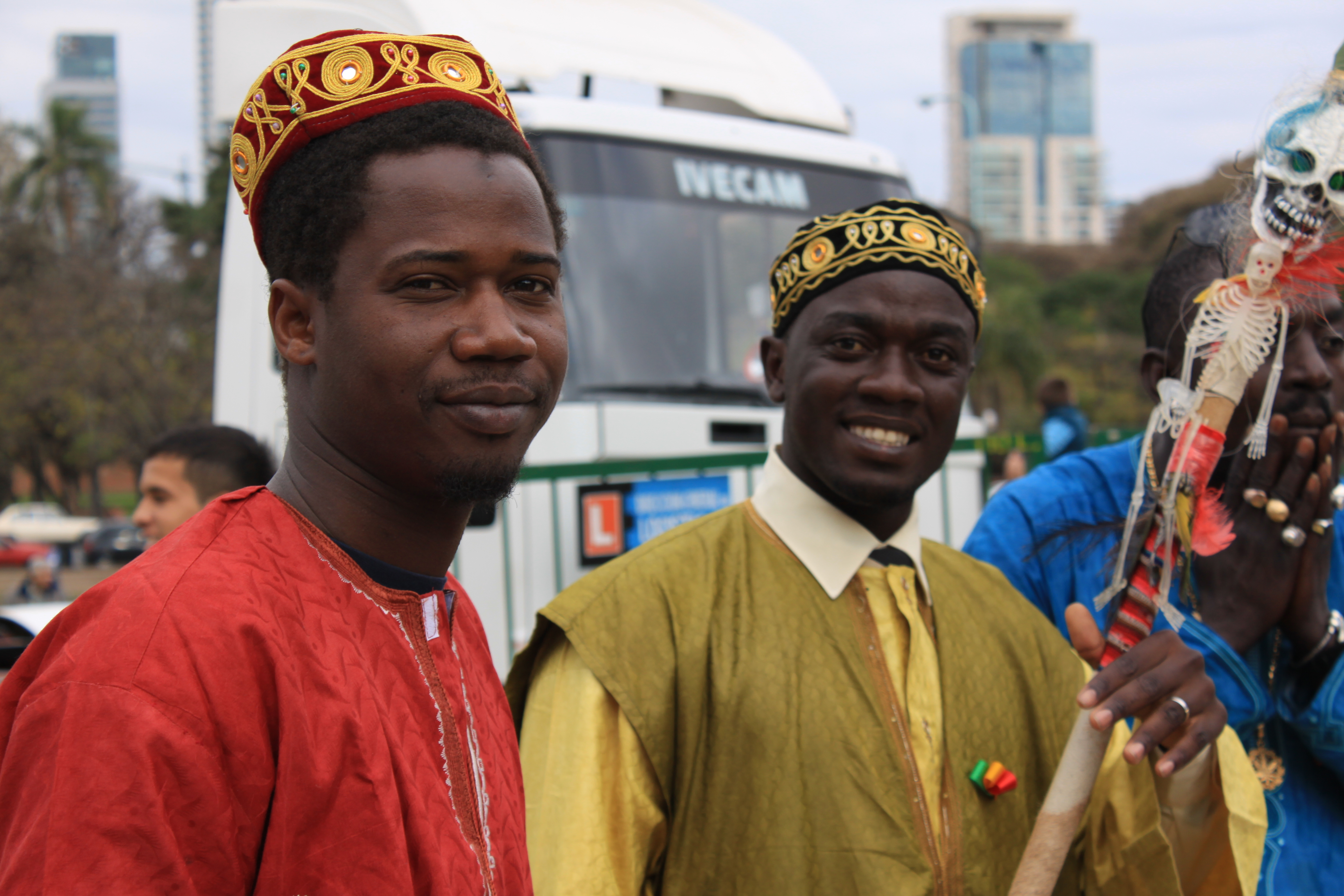
Senegalese immigrants during Immigrants' Day in Buenos Aires.

In the unofficial barrio of Once (Buenos Aires) there are Africans who have come to Argentina to escape the conditions of their home countries, particularly Senegal. According to the Agency for Refugees in Buenos Aires, they came by seeking asylum or getting a visa to travel to Brazil and then Argentina, sometimes traveling as stowaways on ships. When denied a residence permit, these African refugees remain in the country without status and become targets of human trafficking networks. On Sundays, some of the Senegalese community come together to eat traditional dishes from their country. Some places already have African food recipes.

==== In Rosario ====
Since 2004 some Africans have emigrated from their home countries and stowed away to Argentina, particularly to the port of Rosario, Santa Fe. Although figures are inadequate the numbers increase every year: in 2008 70 refugees arrived, after some 40 the previous year; only 10 remained, the rest were repatriated. Many were children.

Most had boarded ships without knowing where they were heading, or believing they were going to a developed country in the northern hemisphere. They came from Nigeria, Côte d'Ivoire and Guinea.

=== Black population by province ===
Rank	Province	Percentage	Total population
1	Buenos Aires City	1.31%	40,670
2	(Chubut Province) Chubut	0.90%	5,302
3	(Tierra del Fuego Province, Argentina) Tierra del Fuego	0.90%	1,658
4	(Salta Province) Salta	0.74%	10,632
5	(Buenos Aires Province) Buenos Aires	0.74%	128,804
6	(Misiones Province) Misiones	0.74%	9,374
7	(Río Negro Province) Río Negro	0.73%	5,463
8	(Santa Cruz Province, Argentina) Santa Cruz	0.73%	2,446
9	(Neuquén Province) Neuquén	0.71%	5,026
10	(Jujuy Province) Jujuy	0.69%	5,583
11	(Entre Ríos Province) Entre Ríos	0.63%	8,910
12	(Corrientes Province) Corrientes	0.52%	6,310
13	La Rioja	0.51%	1,959
14	(Formosa Province) Formosa	0.49%	2,956
15	(Córdoba Province, Argentina) Córdoba	0.48%	18,366
16	(La Pampa Province) La Pampa	0.48%	1,726
17	(Chaco Province) Chaco	0.48%	5,357
18	(Santa Fe Province) Santa Fe	0.47%	16,560
19	(Catamarca Province) Catamarca	0.46%	1,965
20	(Tucumán Province) Tucumán	0.42%	7,172
21	(Mendoza Province) Mendoza	0.40%	8,141
22	(Santiago del Estero Province) Santiago del Estero	0.40%	4,211
23	(San Luis Province) San Luis	0.35%	1,896
24	(San Juan Province, Argentina) San Juan	0.30%	2,449
Source: Argentina census INDEC.

== African influence in Argentine culture ==
=== Music ===
==== Candombe ====
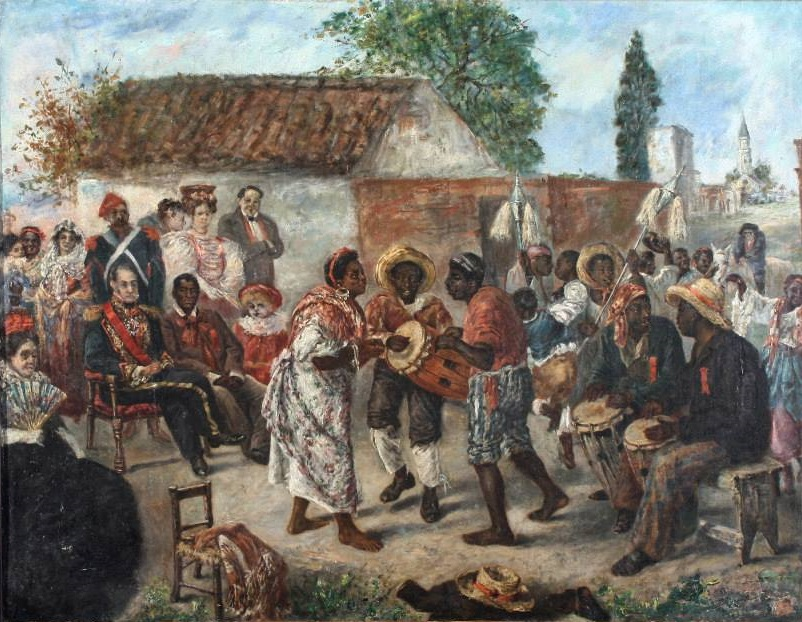
El Tambo Congo (1820), by Martín Boneo. General Juan Manuel de Rosas is depcited at a candombe.

The seeds of candombe originated in present-day Angola, from where it was taken to South America during the 17th and 18th centuries by people who had been sold as slaves in the kingdoms of Kongo, Anziqua, Nyong, Quang and others, mainly by Portuguese slave traders. The same cultural carriers of candombe arrived in Brazil (especially in the area of Salvador de Bahia), Cuba, and the Río de la Plata with its capitals Buenos Aires and Montevideo. The different histories and experiences in these regions branched out from this common origin, giving rise to different rhythms.

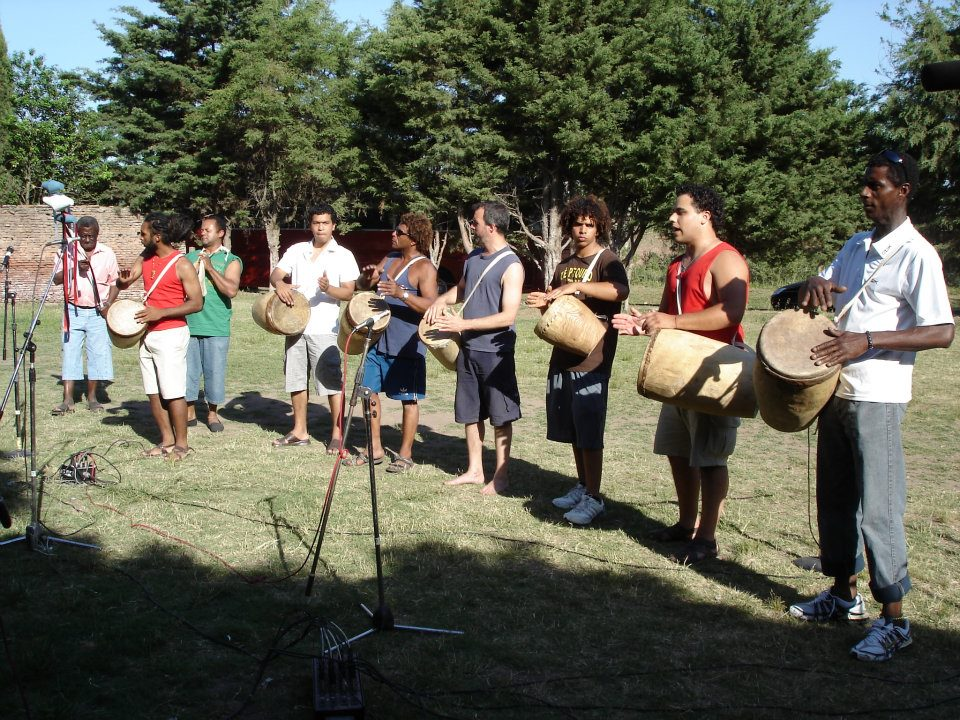
An Afro-Argentine group playing Candombe (2007).

In Buenos Aires, during the two governments of Juan Manuel de Rosas, it was common for "afroporteños" (Black people of Buenos Aires) to perform candombe in public; the practice was even encouraged by Rosas and his daughter, Manuela, who visited performances. Rosas was defeated at the battle of Caseros in 1852, and Buenos Aires began a profound and rapid cultural shift that placed greater emphasis on European culture. In this context, afroporteños increasingly took their ancestral cultural practices into their private lives. For this reason, from 1862 onwards, the press, intellectuals and politicians began to assert the misconception of Afro-Argentine "disappearance" that persists in the popular imagination in Argentina.

Many researchers agree that candombe, through the development of the milonga, is an essential component in the genesis of Argentine tango. The musical rhythm was a heavy influence, especially the "Sureña Milonga". In fact, tango, milonga and candombe form a musical triptych from the same African roots, but with different developments.

Initially, candombe was practiced exclusively by Black people, who designated specific venues called "Tangós". This word originated sometime in the 19th century, but not yet with its present meaning. Today, candombe is still practiced by Afro-Argentine and non-Black populations across Argentina. In Corrientes Province, candombe is part of the religious feast of San Baltasar, a folk patron saint for Black Argentines.

==== Tango ====
Perhaps the most lasting effect of Black influence in Argentina is tango, which contains and continues some of the features of the tangós, meetings in which slaves assembled to sing and dance. The modern term for a tango ball, milonga, has its roots in the Quimbanda language of Angola, and a large Afro-Argentine and Afro-Uruguayan contribution is also evident in the development of milonga and chacarera music. The song tradition of the payadores was also associated with Afro-Argentines, with some scholars—for example George Reid Andrews—arguing that it originated among the Afro-Argentine community, while others—such as Sylvain B. Poosson—view it as a continuation of Andalusian traditions like the trovo. Whatever their origin, payadas provided an opportunity for Black singers like Gabino Ezeiza to use music to articulate political consciousness and defend their right to exist within Argentina's increasingly white-dominated society.

==== Murga ====
Argentine murga has considerable influence from candombe and other African musical rhythms. Murga porteña places a considerable emphasis on dance and instrumentals, more so than lyrics (in contrast to Uruguayan murga). Performances take place in the form of parades (known as corsos) across the various neighbourhoods of Buenos Aires; some groups feature not only dancers and musicians but also jugglers, stilts, flagbearers, and other visually stimulating elements. Corsos take place throughout the year, but are recurrent during carnival season in February.

== Racism ==
In Argentina, as in other countries of the Americas, racism related to skin tone dates back to the days of colonial rule. In the caste system imposed by Spain, the descendants of people from Africa occupied an even lower place than the descendants of people belonging to aboriginal peoples.

Colonial racism passed into Argentine culture to a certain extent, as shown by certain phrases included in the national literature. Disputes with a racist element were depicted in a famous passage from José Hernández's book Martín Fierro, published in 1870, in which the main character duels with a Black gaucho after insulting his girlfriend, taunting him with the following verse:

God made the white, and Saint Peter the brown,
At least so I’ve heard men tell;
But the devil himself he made the black,
As coals for the fire of hell.

— The Gaucho Martin Fierro, by Jose Hernandez, translated by Walter Owen (1935)

== Notable Afro-Argentines (including Argentines with afro-ascendence) ==
=== Military ===
- María Remedios del Valle (ca. 1768–1847), senior master sergeant in the War of Independence and "Mother of the Homeland"
- Domingo Sosa (1788–1866), colonel in the War of Independence and the Civil Wars
- Juan Bautista Cabral (1789–1813), private in the War of Independence and national hero
- Antonio Ruiz (died 1810), soldier in the War of Independence and national hero
- Lorenzo Barcala (1793–1835), lieutenant colonel in the Civil Wars
- Celestino Barcala (died 1867), major in the Civil Wars
- José María Morales (1818–1894), colonel in the Civil Wars and the War of the Triple Alliance and legislator
- Manuel G. Posadas (1841–1897), musician, journalist, and sergeant in the War of the Triple Alliance

=== Politics ===
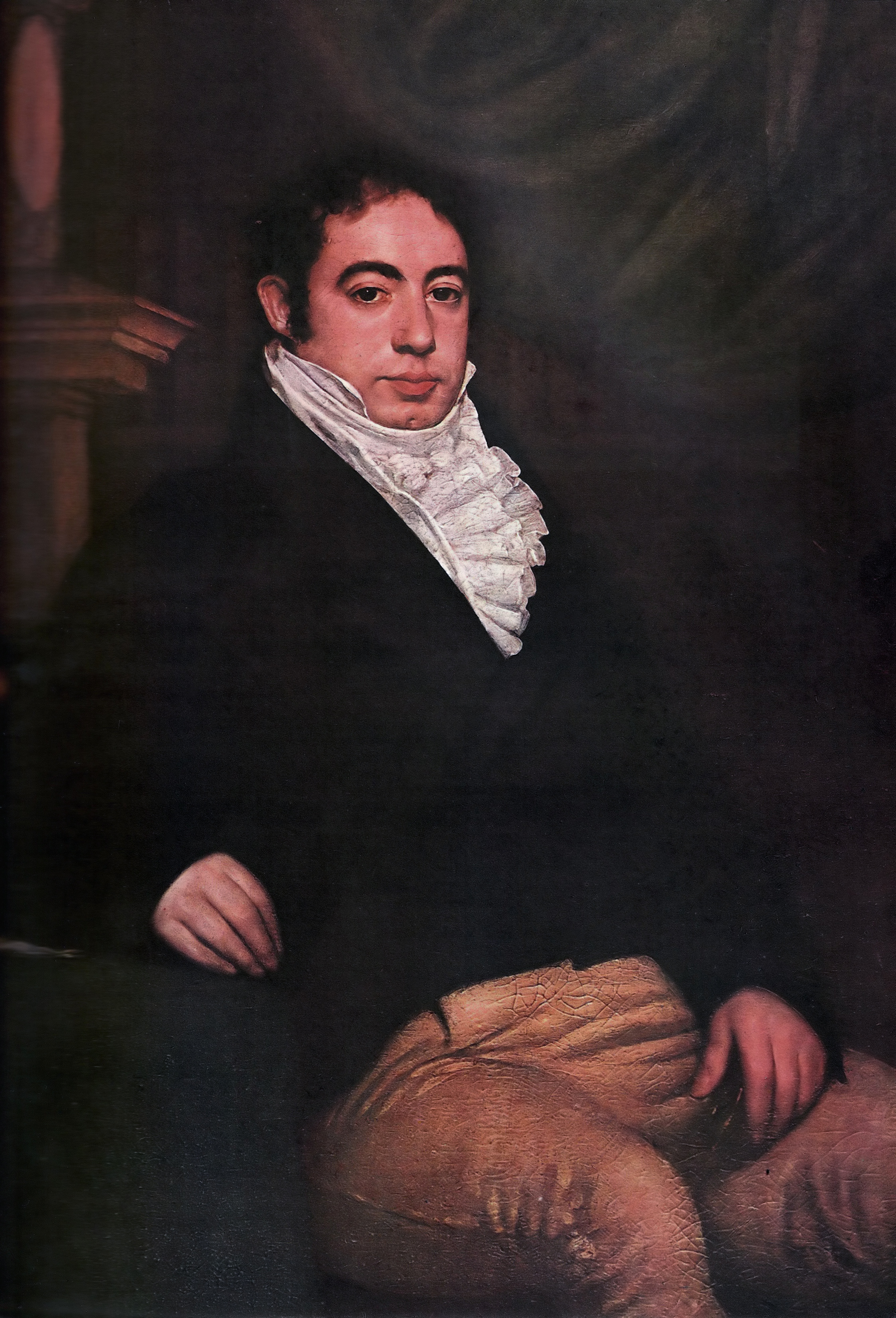
Bernardino Rivadavia, first President of Argentina.

- Bernardino Rivadavia (1780–1845), first president of Argentina
- Bernardo de Monteagudo (1789–1825), independence leader and deputy of the Assembly of the Year XIII
- Tomás Platero IV (1857–1925), writer, poet and co-founder of the Radical Civic Union
- Ramón Carrillo (1906–1956), neurosurgeon and first Health Minister of Argentina
- Pocha Lamadrid (1945–2021), activist and founder of África Vive
- María Fernanda Silva (born 1965), diplomat and ambassador
- David Leiva (born 1980), member of the Salta Chamber of Deputies and former city councillor

=== Music and literature ===
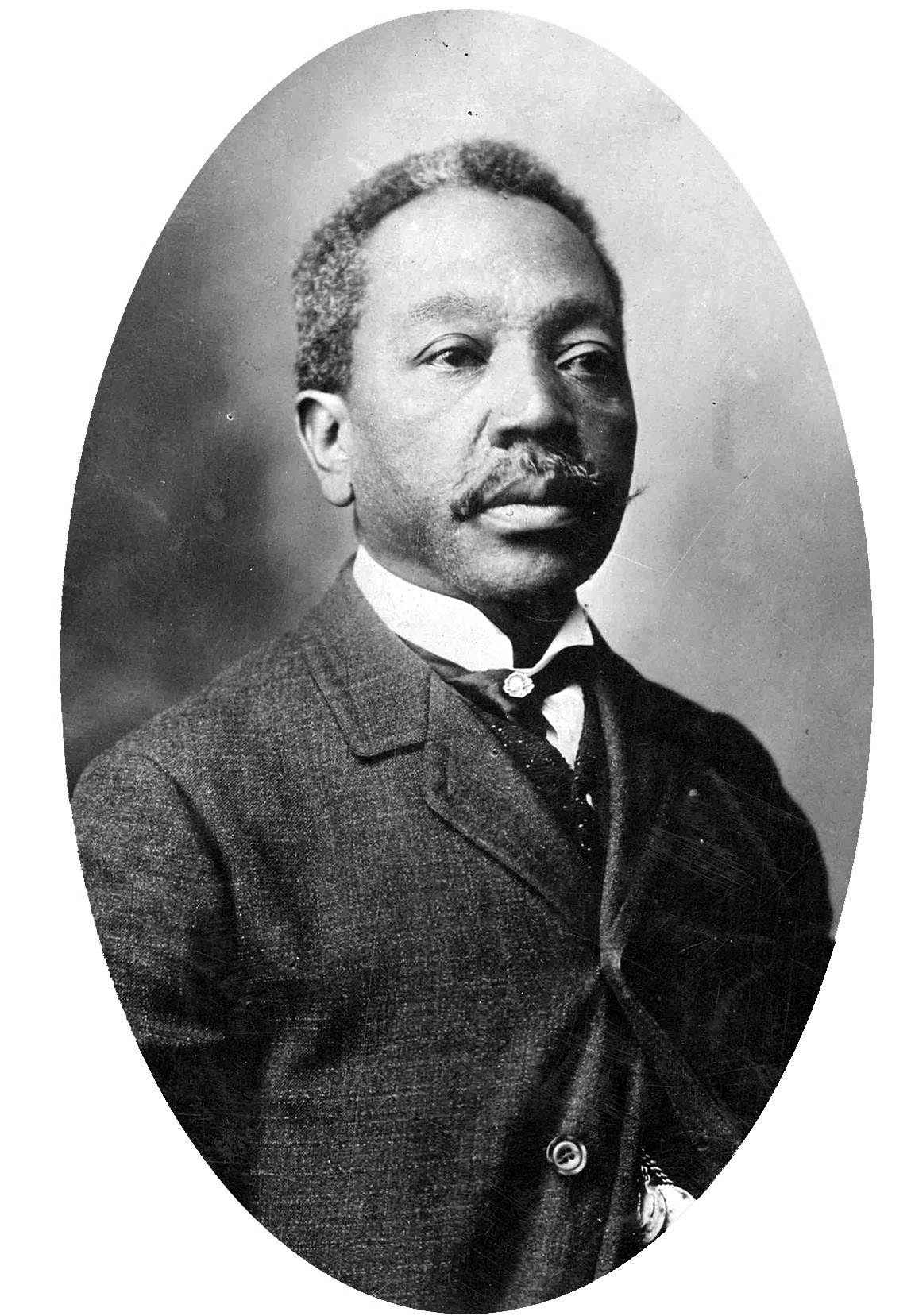
Gabino Ezeiza, one of the greatest performers in the art of the payada.

- Casimiro Alcorta (1840–1913), tango violinist, dancer and songwriter
- Zenón Rolón (1856–1902), composer
- Gabino Ezeiza (1858–1916), payador, singer-songwriter, and pioneer of the tango
- Manuel Posadas (1860–1916), tango composer
- Higinio Cazón (1866–1914), payador and tango composer
- Rosendo Mendizábal (1868–1913), tango composer
- Carlos Posadas (1874–1918), tango composer
- Cayetano Alberto Silva (1868–1920), composer of the March of San Lorenzo
- Guillermo Barbieri (1894–1935), composer and singer
- Enrique Maciel (1897–1962), guitarist, bandoneonist and composer
- Oscar Alemán (1909–1980), jazz composer and dancer
- Horacio Salgán (1916–2016), tango singer-songwriter
- Carmen Platero (1933–2020), playwright and actress
- La Mona Jiménez (born 1951), cuarteto singer-songwriter
- Carlos García López (1958–2014), rock guitarist
- Fidel Nadal (born 1965), reggae singer-songwriter
- Emanuel Ntaka (born 1977), pop singer
- Lucila Rada (born 1981), singer, songwriter, actress and television presenter
- Julieta Rada (born 1990), singer, songwriter and television personality

=== TV and film ===
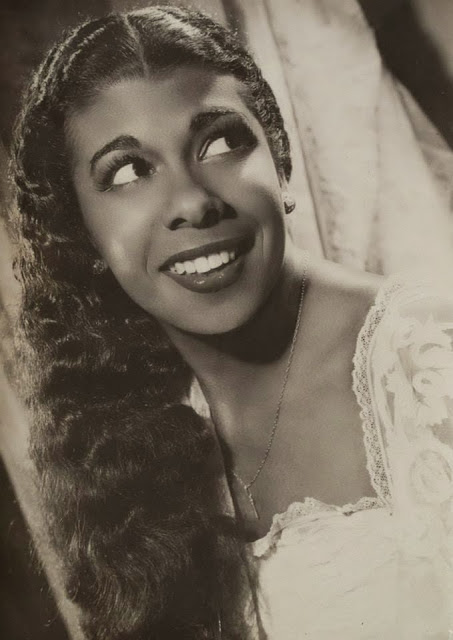
Rita Lucía Montero, actress and singer.

- José A. Ferreyra (1889–1943), director, screenwriter and producer
- Rita Montero (1928–2013), stage, TV and film actress and singer
- Carmen Barbieri (born 1955), actress
- Diego Alonso Gómez (born 1972), TV and film actor
- Marcos Martínez (born 1977), TV and film actor and comedian

=== Sports ===
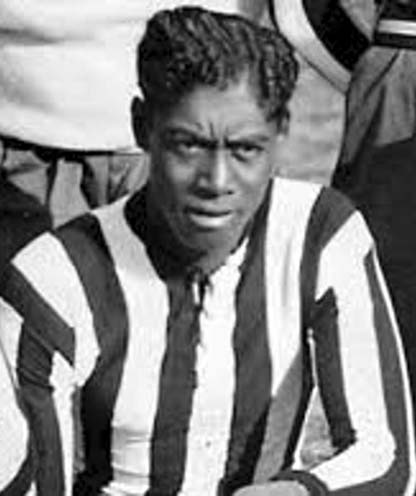
Alejandro de los Santos, footballer.

- Alejandro de los Santos (1902–1982), footballer
- Arturo Rodríguez (1907–1982), boxer
- Guillermo Lovell (1912–1966), boxer
- Santiago Lovell (1918–1967), boxer
- Miguel Montuori (1932–1998) footballer
- José Ramos Delgado (1935–2010), footballer
- Santiago Lovell Jr. (1942–2002), boxer
- Pedro Lovell (born 1945), boxer
- Héctor Baley (born 1950), footballer
- Diego Armando Maradona (born 1960), footballer
- David Trezeguet (born 1977), French footballer
- Wilson Severino (born 1980), footballer
- Clemente Rodríguez (born 1981), footballer
- Fernando Tissone (born 1986), footballer
- Cristian Tissone (born 1988), footballer
- Sthefany Thomas (born 1989), Argentine-American basketball player
- Facundo Silva (born 1991), footballer
- Erika Mercado (born 1992), Ecuadorian volleyball player
- Matías Presentado (born 1992), footballer
- James Parker (born 1994), handball player
- Joana Bolling (born 1995), handball player
- Erik Thomas (born 1995), basketball player
- Héctor David Martínez (born 1998), footballer
- Ayrton Costa (born 1999), footballer
- Dalila Ippólito (born 2002) footballer
- Cristian Medina (born 2002), footballer
- Manuel Armoa (born 2002), volleyball player
- Lee Aaliya (born 2004), basketball player
- Kiki Ramos (born 2009), footballer

=== Other ===
- Felipa Larrea (1810–1910), last surviving former slave in Argentina
- Antonio Gonzaga (born 1875), chef and cookbook writer
- María Angélica Barreda (1887–1963), lawyer
- Dominga Lucía Molina (born 1949), activist
- Mirta Toledo (born 1952), artist and writer

== Gallery ==
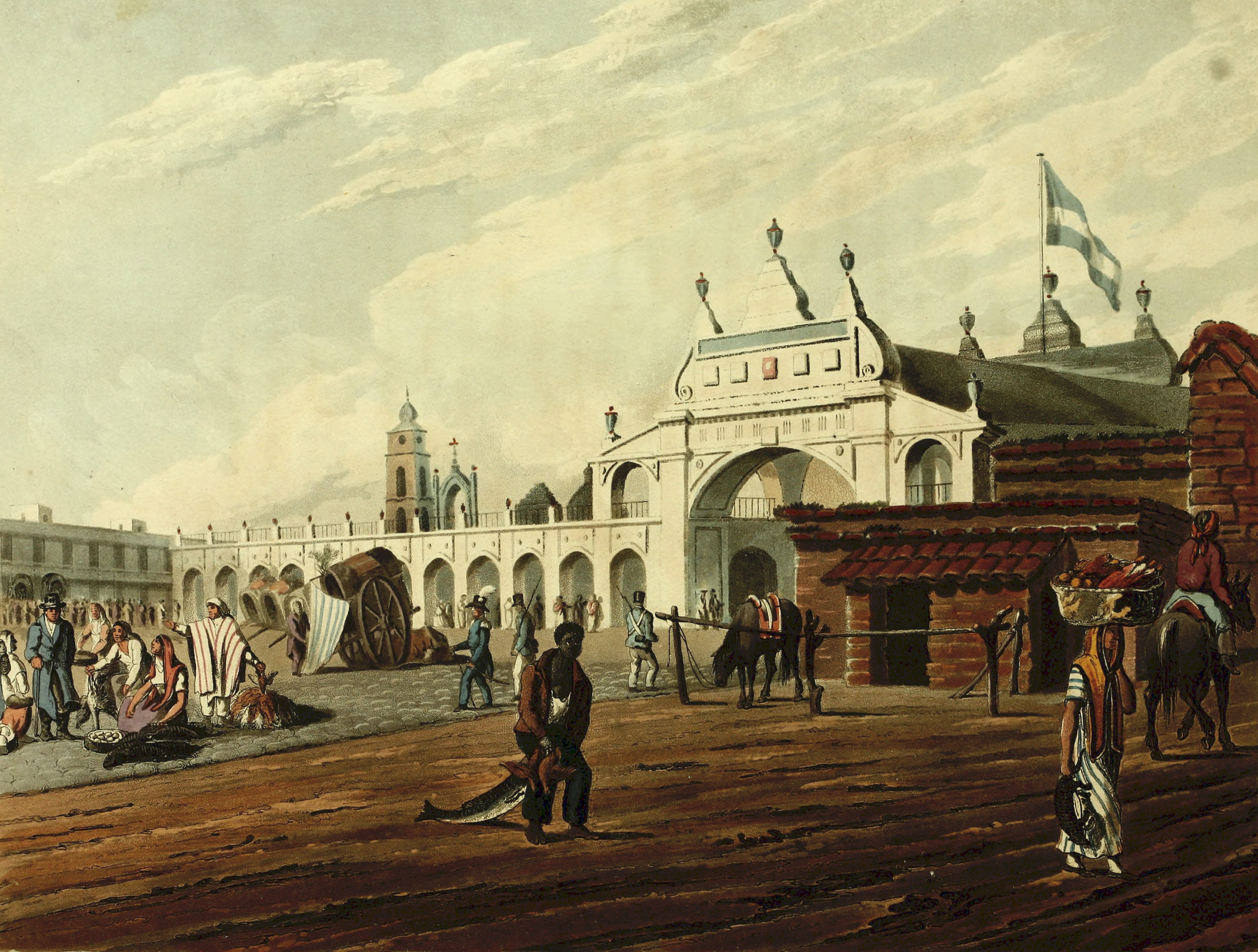
Main market in Buenos Aires. In the centre foreground a Black fisherman brings a dorado.

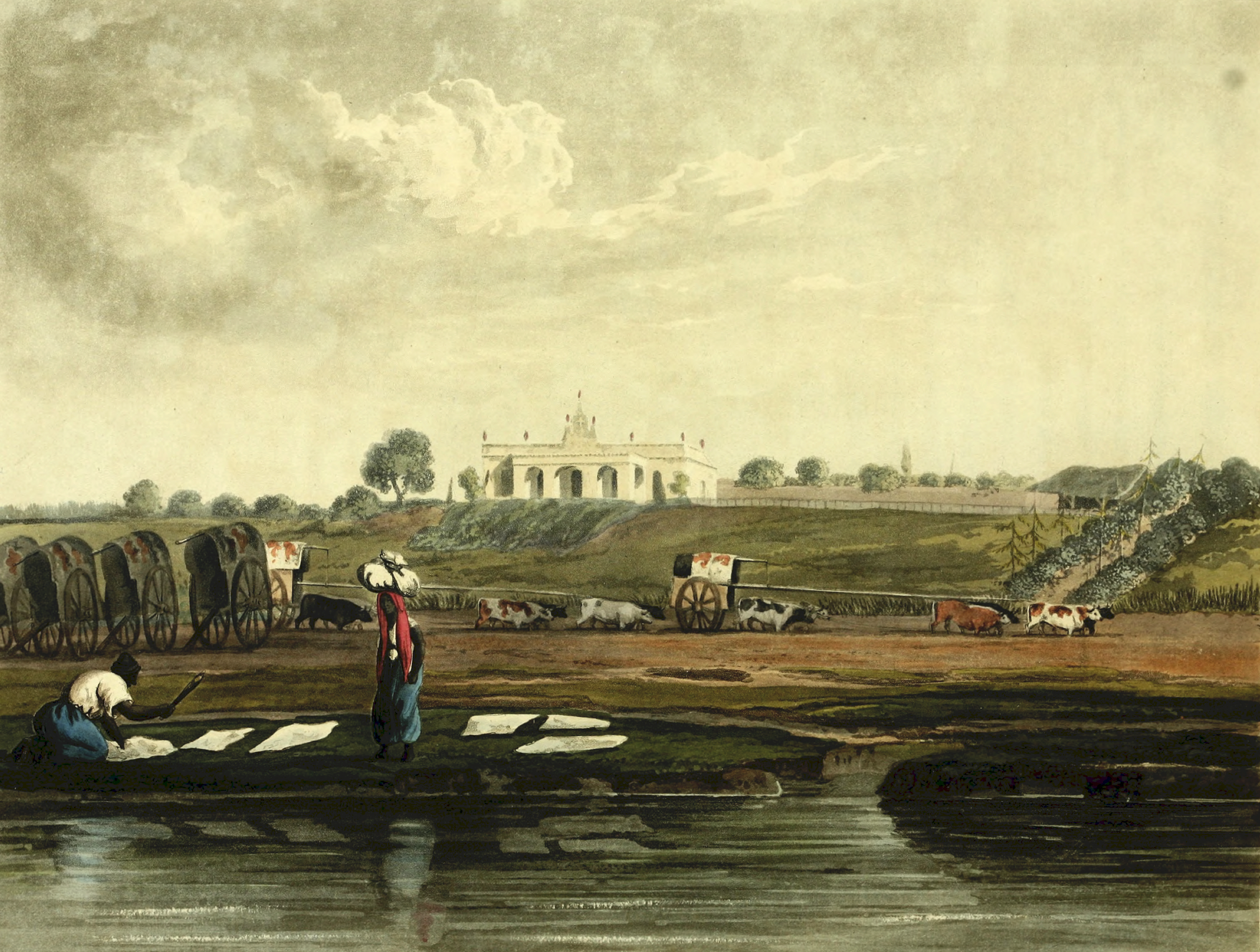
Quinta on the west bank of the Río de la Plata. Black workers perform tasks in the foreground (1818).

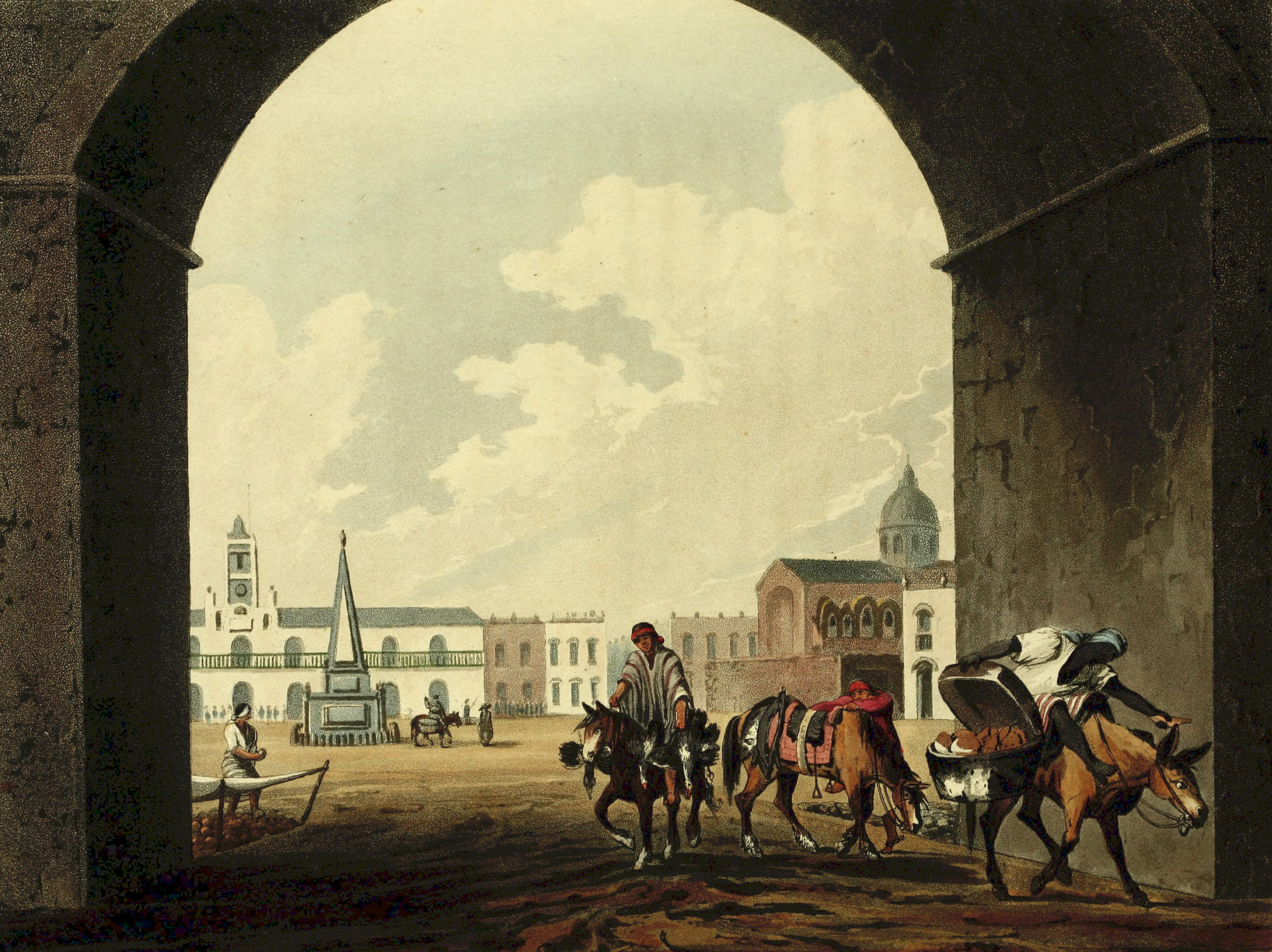
The main square in Buenos Aires. In the bottom right is an Afro-Argentine riding a donkey.

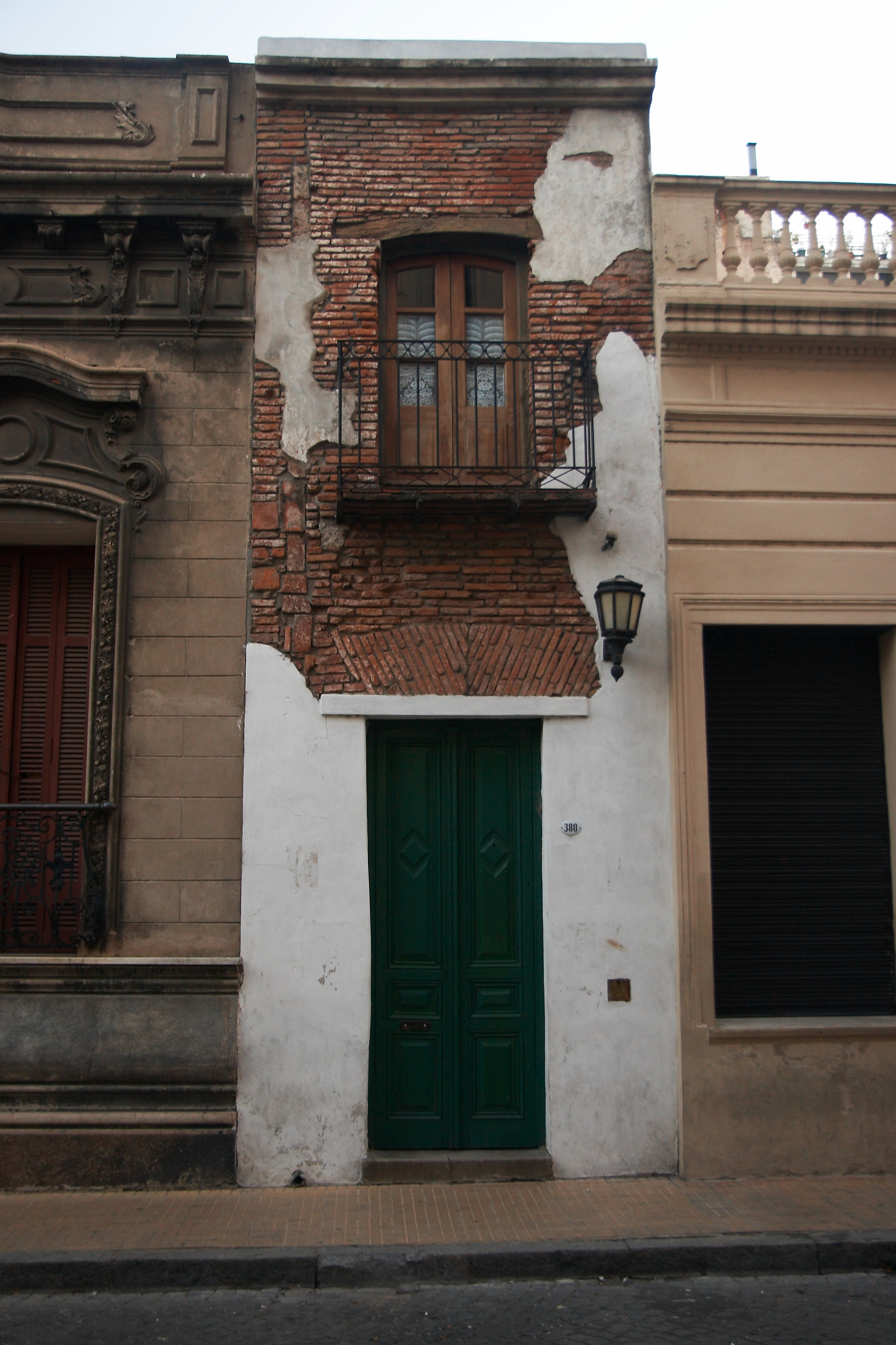
The Casa Mínima in San Telmo, Buenos Aires, built by freedmen following the 1812 abolition of slavery in Argentina.

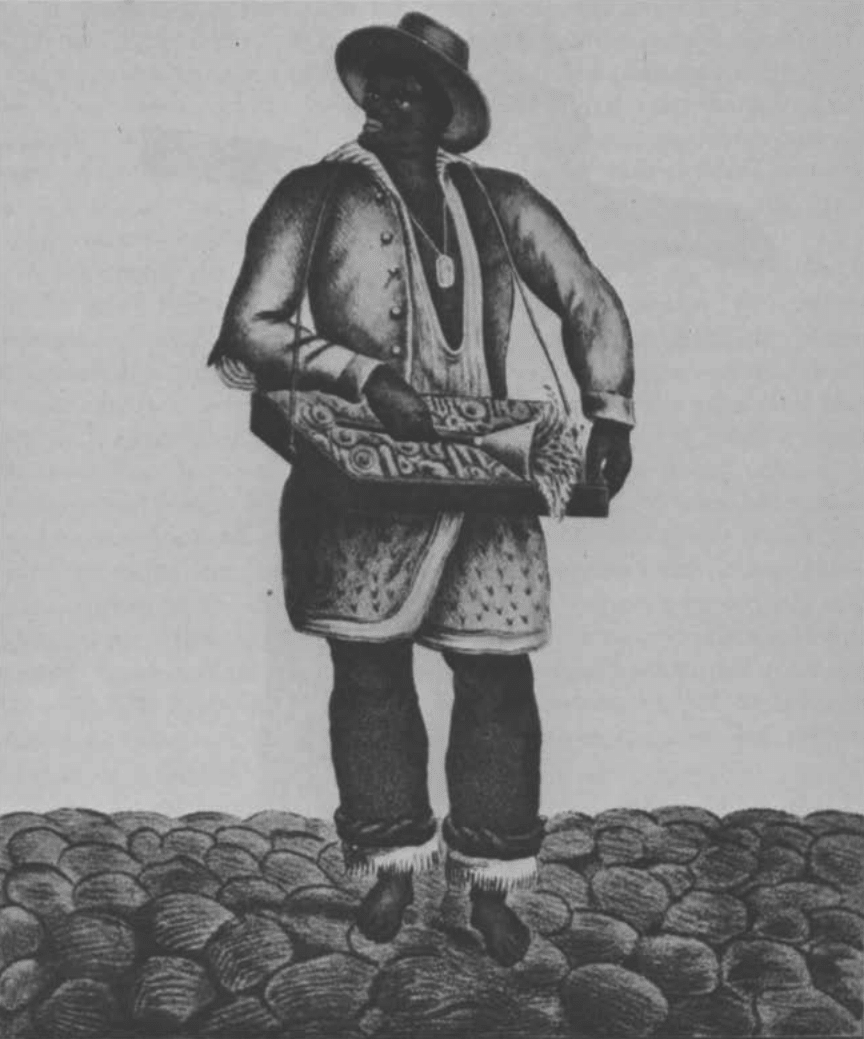
An Afro-Argentine pastry vendor circa 1830.

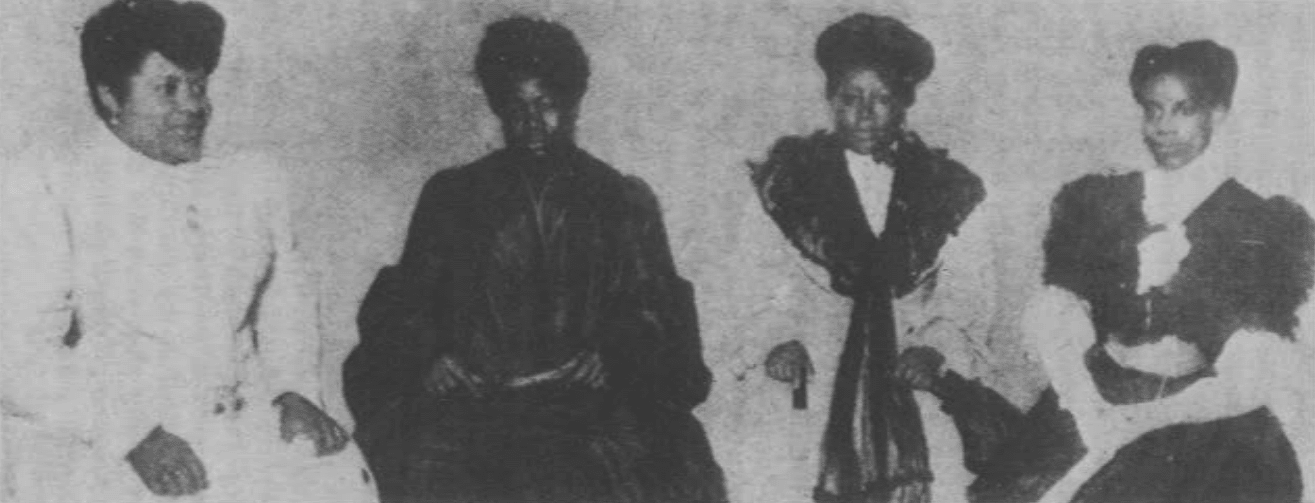
Upper-class Black porteños at a dance in 1902.

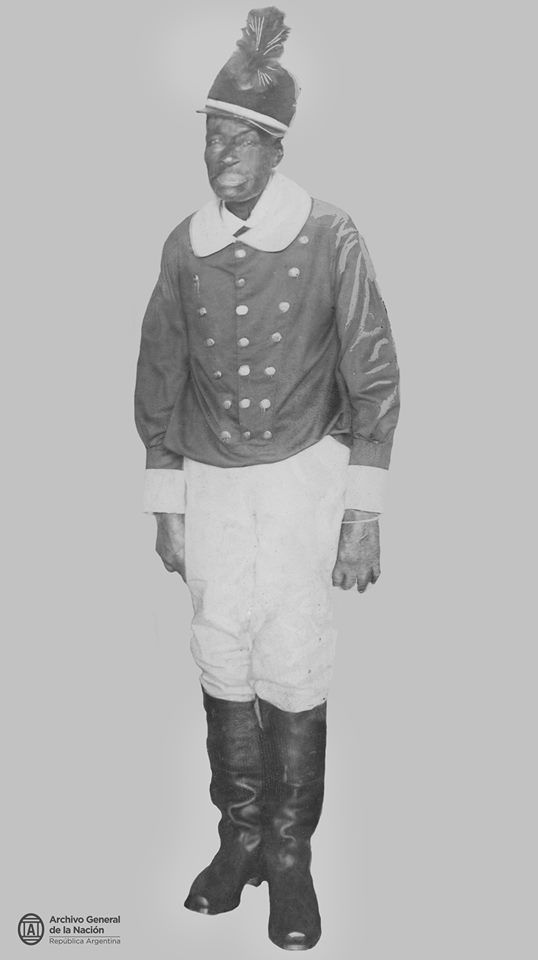
An Afro-Argentine soldier from the turn of the 19th century.

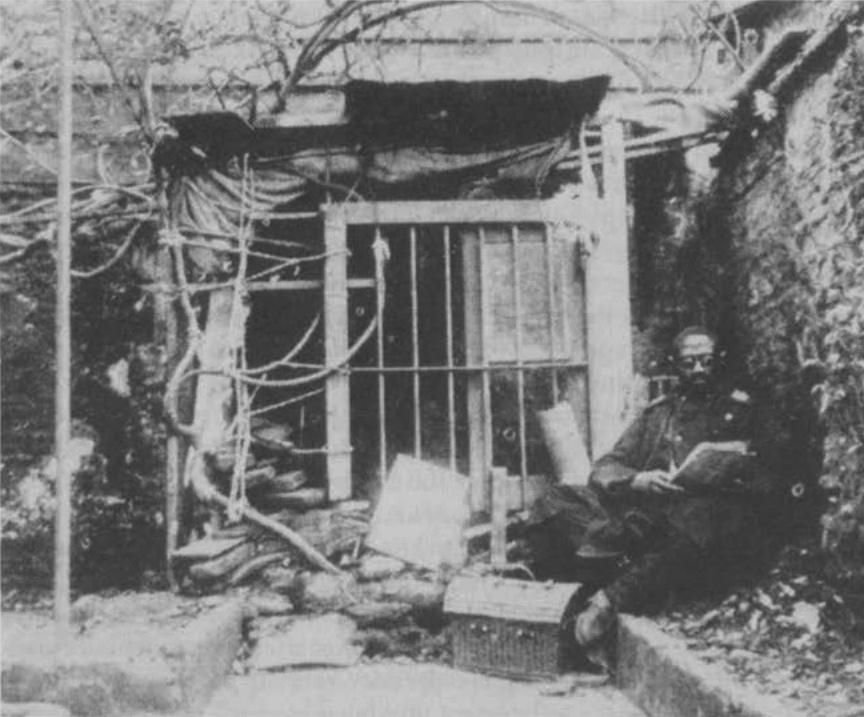
Juan Martínez Moreira, a survivor of the War of the Triple Alliance, photographed for Caras y Caretas.

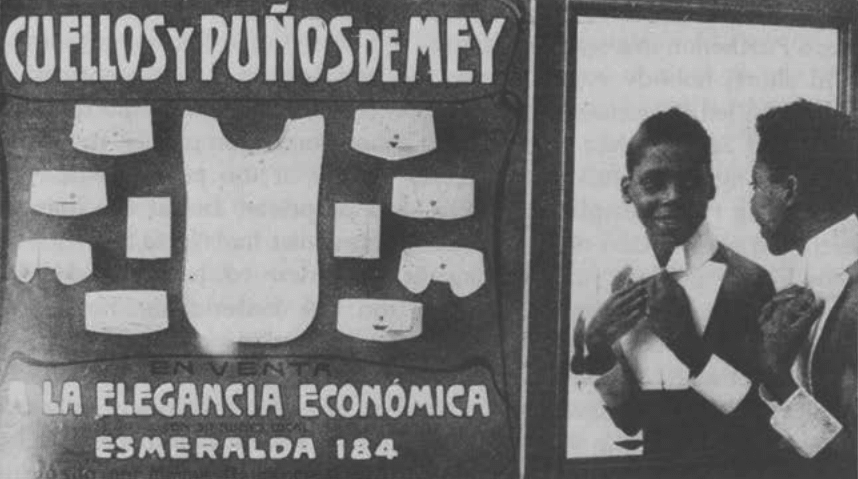
An advertisement for collars and cuffs in the magazine Caras y Caretas (1902).

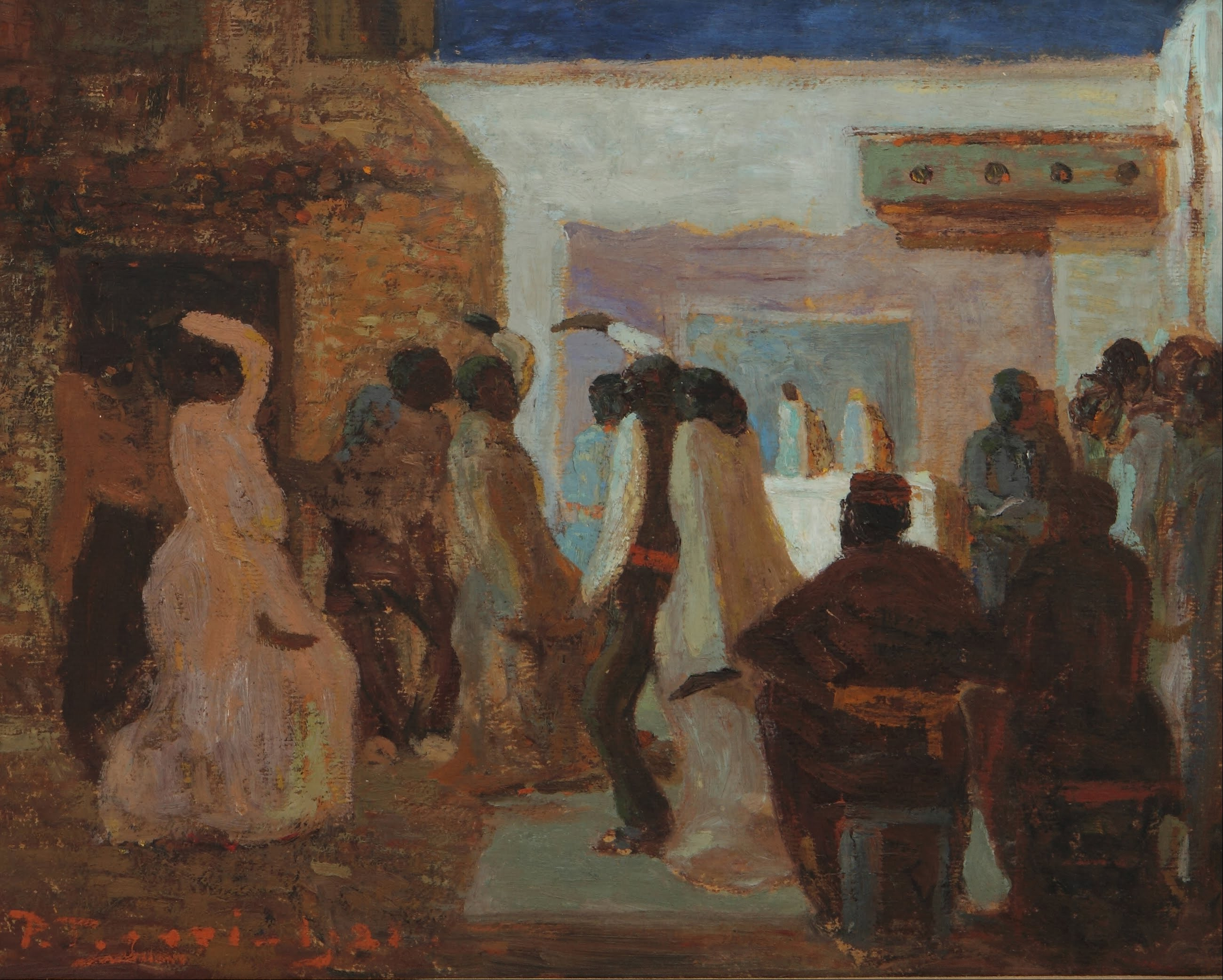
An oil canvas painting depicting candombe (1922).

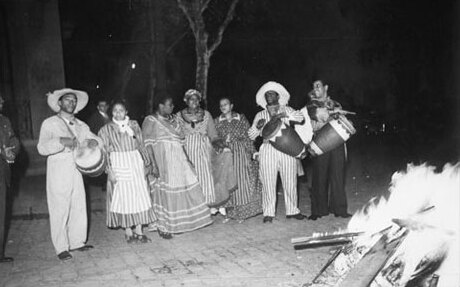
Black Argentines playing candombe in 1938, San Juan.

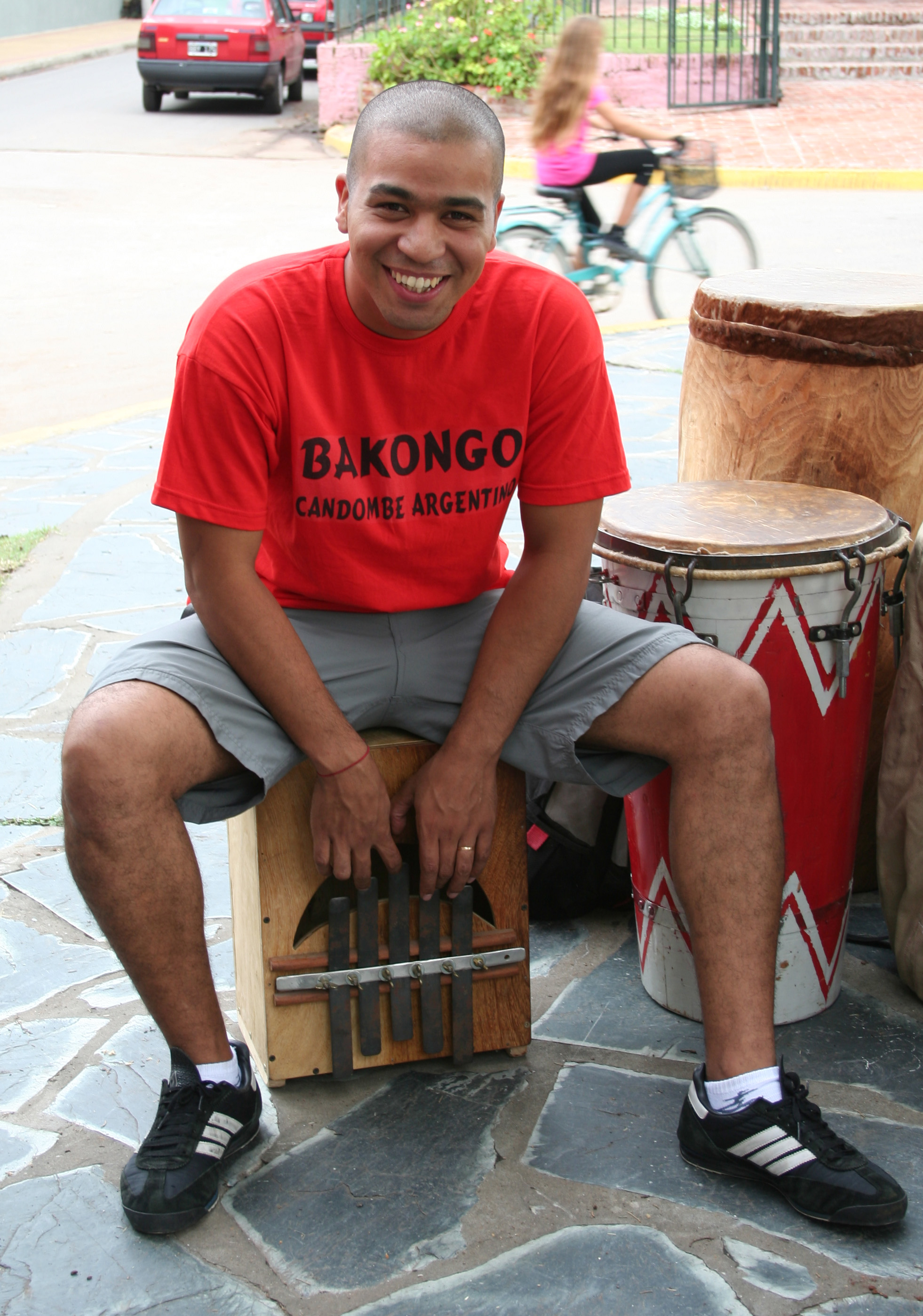
Mixed Argentine with Afro ancestry playing a quisanche for candombe

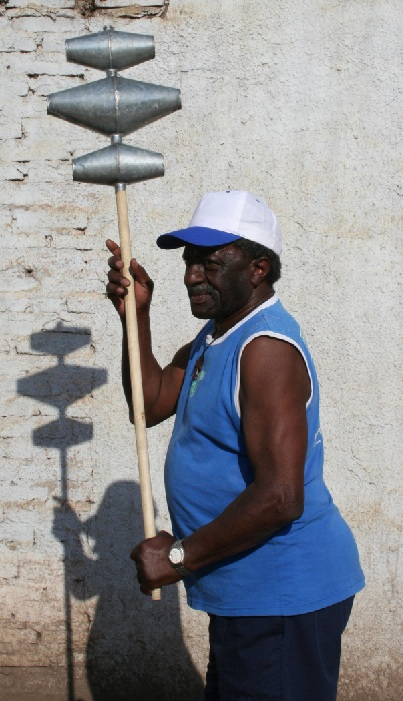
Masacalla, with three parts, belonging to the "Comparsa Negros Argentinos" of "Misibamba Association", Buenos Aires.

== See also ==
- Candombe
- Tango
- Milonga (music)
- Chacarera
- Afro-Latin American
- Argentine people
- African immigration to Latin America
- Demographics of Argentina
- Immigration to Argentina
- Angolan Argentine
- Cape Verdean Argentines
- Ethnic groups of Argentina
