= Carmen Platero =

Argentine playwright (1933–2020)

- Born: María del Carmen Platero; 3 August 1933; La Plata, Argentina
- Died: 16 March 2020 (aged 86); Tandil, Argentina
- Citizenship: Argentina
- Occupations: Playwright, actress

María del Carmen Platero (3 August 1933 – 16 March 2020), known as Carmen Platero, was an Argentine playwright and actress who worked to promote Afro-descendant culture in Latin America. In 1987, she co-founded the theater group Comedia Negra de Buenos Aires.

== Early life and education ==
Carmen Platero was born in 1933 in La Plata, Argentina. She was one of seven children born to Tomás Nemesio Platero and Ana Francisca Prola, who moved the family to Tandil when Carmen was 3 years old. She was Afro-Argentine. Her family was descended from enslaved Africans brought to Argentina, and her grandfather was the prominent lawyer Tomás Platero IV.

Platero attended the normal school in Tandil, and then, starting in 1959, continued her studies at the Escuela de Teatro La Plata, where she found her true passion. After graduating from the theater school in 1964, she worked to improve her craft under Augusto Fernandes and Carlos Gandolfo.

== Career ==
Platero is known for her work as a playwright and actress. Her first major performance, in Roberto Habegger's one-woman show Tango para solo de mujer, came in the early 1970s.

Across her career, she worked to study and share Afro-Argentine culture, often in partnership with her sister Susana. One of their first major projects together was Afroamérica 70, a show that incorporated work by the likes of Nicomedes Santa Cruz and Nicolás Guillén. Their 1975 piece, Calunga Andumba, more directly paid homage to Afro-Argentine culture, rather than Afro-Latin culture broadly; performances of the show were shut down after the 1976 Argentine coup d'état.

A few months after the coup, in December 1976, Platero and her family went into exile in Spain. In 1979, they moved to Costa Rica, where she continued her work to promote Afro-descendant culture in Limón. The year after Argentina returned to democracy in 1983, she returned to her home country.

Once back in Argentina, with Susana, she founded the Comedia Negra de Buenos Aires in 1987. With the theater company, they staged an updated version of Calunga Andumba to great success.

In 2017, she worked to co-organize the Afro-Argentine studies summit Afrotandil.

Platero also taught acting from Tandil to Costa Rica and Spain. She wrote various other plays, including Epilogo, Rastros, Vigilia, and Memoria mayor. Her first novel, Tango con acento en la o, was published in 2017.

== Personal life and death ==
Carmen Platero was married to the journalist Tomás Saraví, with whom she had four children.

She died in 2020, in Tandil, at age 86.
