= Dominga Lucía Molina =

Argentine activist (born 1949)

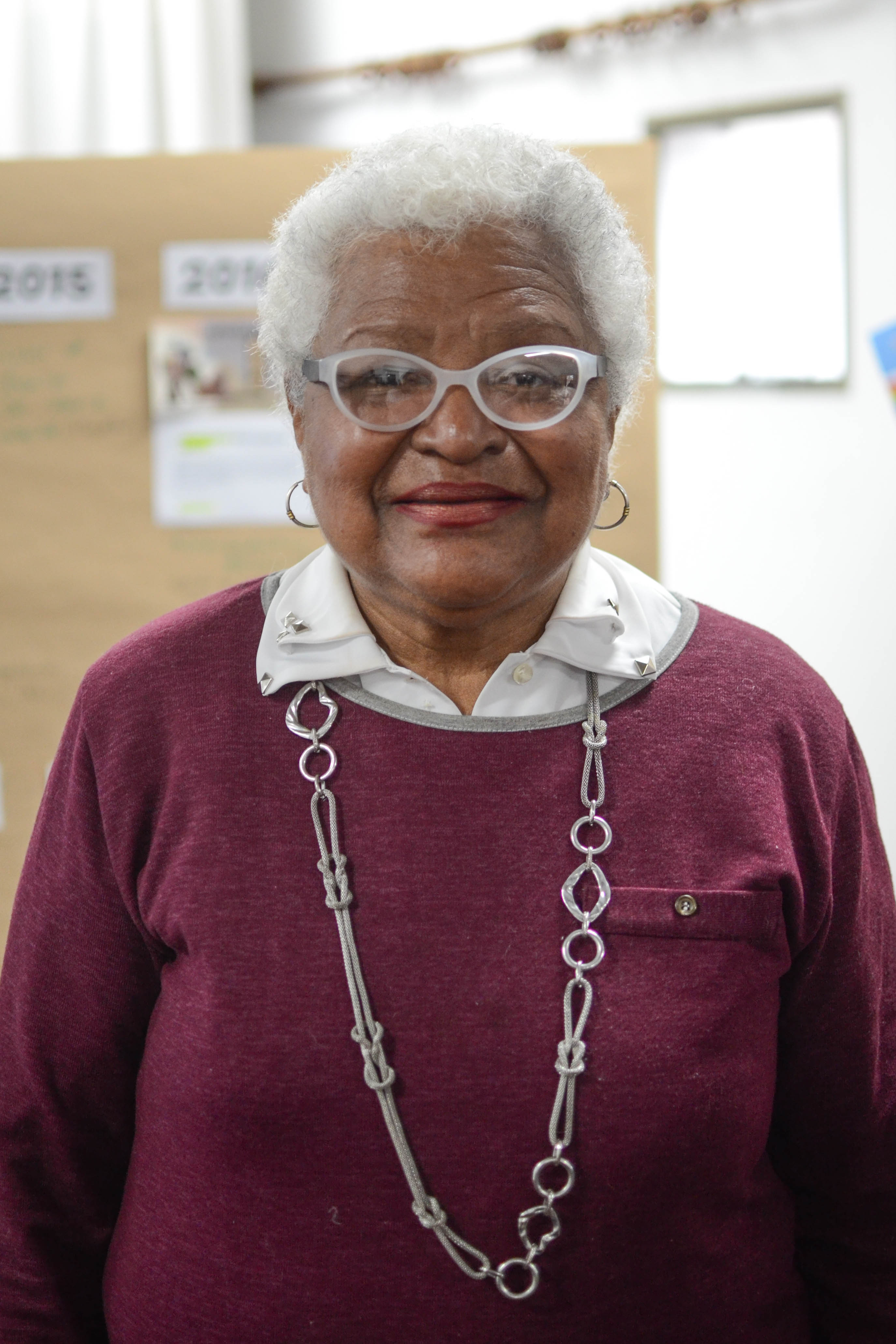
- Molina in 2025
- Born: December 13, 1949 (age 76); Santa Fe, Argentina
- Citizenship: Argentina
- Occupation: Activist
- Spouse: Mario Luis López
- Children: 3

Dominga Lucía Molina (born 13 December 1949) is an Argentine activist. She works to promote Afro-Argentinian identity in Santa Fe and around the country.

== Biography ==
Molina was born on December 13, 1949, in Santa Fe, Argentina to Florinda Sandez Molina, who was of black and indigenous descent, and Ignacio Molina, a member of Los Negros Santafecinos (the Blacks from Santa Fe). While Molina does not know her exact family history, she identifies with the documented Molinas who came to Argentina in the 17th century through the slave trade.

Though she had the opportunity to attend university, Molina decided not to due to poor self-esteem due to the racism around her. Molina studied veterinary science and worked in veterinary clinics. In 1984, she earned a certificate in pharmaceutical sales.

Molina "came to terms with [her] blackness" when she was around thirty, and taught herself about Afro-Argentine history. In 1988, Molina and her husband, Mario Luis López, founded the Casa de la Cultura Indo-Afro-Americana (Indo-Afro-American Cultural House) with Molina as its director. Initially, the center focused on work related to ending the South African Apartheid, but López and Molina began wondering about apartheid in their own country. The institution's work has shifted to preserve and promote the cultural roots of Argentina's Indigenous and Afro-descendant groups and address the problems Afro-Argentines face. This institution is the first and only of its type in the Argentinian provinces. The center has been instrumental in creating a strong Afro-Argentine identity in the region. Molina also founded a library and archive at La Casa de la Cultura Indo-Afro-Americana, which focuses on the study of African descendants in Argentina and has become an international reference center.

In 1991, Molina and López organized the First Workshop of Black Culture in Santa Fe. The next year, Molina joined the Network of Afro-Latin American and Caribbean Women.

Molina has served as president of or represented several Afro-Argentine groups, including the Foro de Entidades Negras del Cono Sur (Forum of Black Organizations in the Southern Cone), Foro de Entidades Negras del Cono Sur in the Red de Organizaciones Afroamericanas, in the Alianza de Organizaciones Afroamericanas de las Américas (Network of Afro-American Organizations), and in the Red de Mujeres Afrocaribeñas y Afrolatinoamericanas (Network of Afro-Caribbean and Afro–Latin American Women). She founded the Red Federal de Afrodescendientes del Tronco Colonial "Tambor Abuelo" (Federal Network of Afro-descendants of the Colonial Trunk).

Molina is dedicated to preparing descendants of slaves from Santa Fe– around the world– with practical skills. In 2001, this work led to her election to represent Argentina at the World Conference against Racism 2001. Since 2007, Molina has been a member of the Consejo Asesor del Instituto Nacional contra la Discriminación, la Xenofobia y el Racismo in Santa Fe.

In 2013, Molina completed a postgraduate course in gender studies.

Molina led a years-long awareness campaign which contributed to the renaming of the Plaza de las Dos Culturas (Plaza of Two Cultures), to the Paseo de las Tres Culturas (Promenade of Three Cultures), honoring the "native peoples, Africans and Europeans gathered together in this city." She also created the Afro-Argentine flag with Martín Moschen.

Molina has created and directed radio programs around Argentina about cultural identity. She has founded a theater and a dance group focused on the reenactment of Afro-Argentine history. In 2003, Molina began hosting the radio program Indoafroamérica … un programa por los derechos de las minorías (Indoafroamerica ... A Program for the Rights of Minorities). She also participates in theater and writes and performs poetry. Her poetry argues for the recognition of African identity in the face of the whitening of Argentinian identity.

== Personal life ==
Molina married Mario Luis López, who died in 2010. Molina and López had three children, who continue their parents' work.
