= Antonio Gonzaga =

Argentinian cook and author

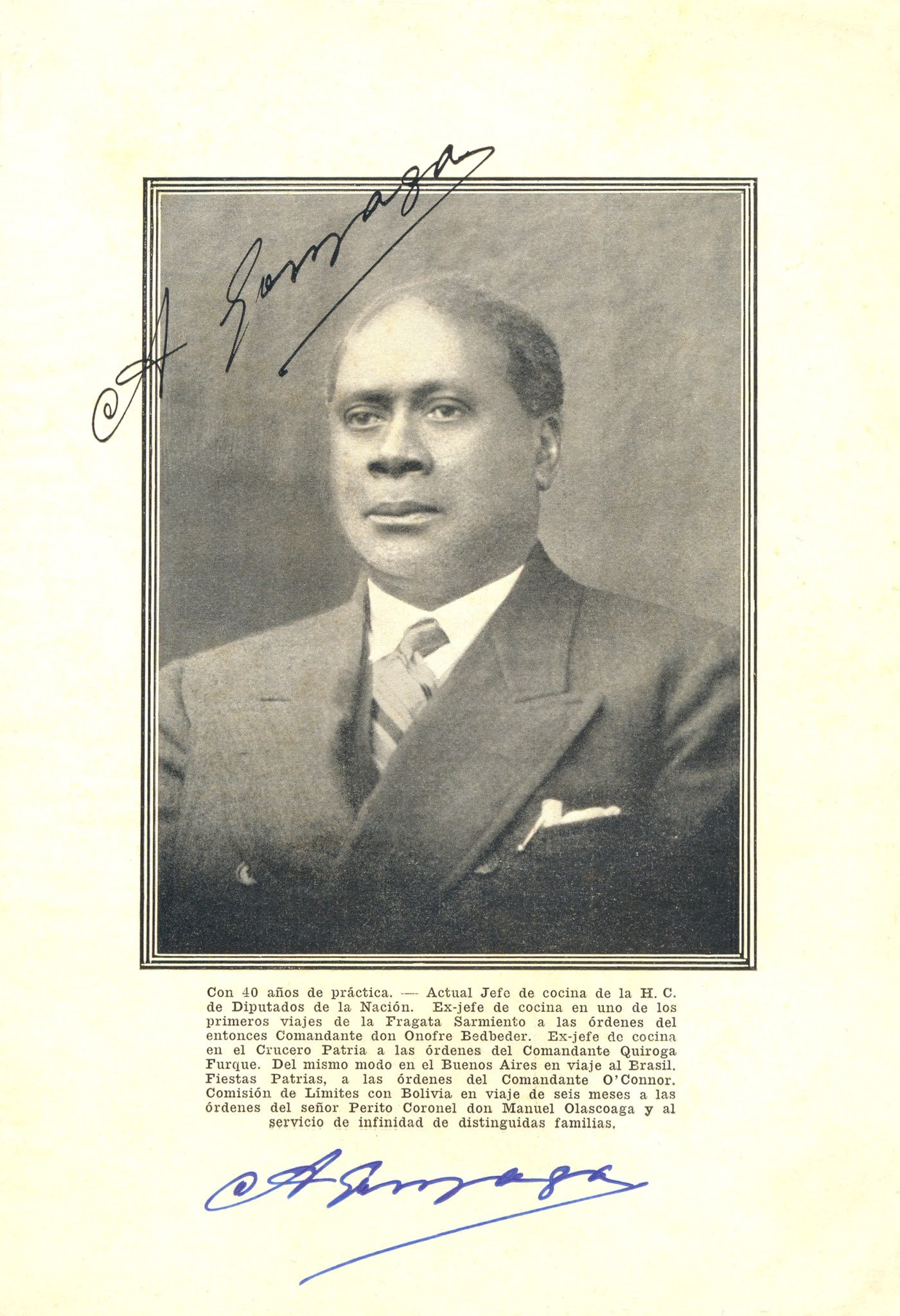
- Signed portrait of Gonzaga in the 1931 edition of El cocinero práctico argentino
- Born: c. 1875; Corrientes, Argentina
- Occupations: Chef; cookbook author
- Notable work: El cocinero práctico argentino (1931)
- Style: Argentine cuisine

Antonio Gonzaga (c. 1875, date of death unknown), also known as El Negro Gonzaga, was an Argentine chef and cookbook writer. His 1931 book, El cocinero práctico argentino ("The Practical Argentine Cookbook") is credited as the first cookbook published in Argentina.

== Early life and career ==
Born in Corrientes into an Afro-Argentine family, Gonzaga was a third-generation cook; his grandfather, Luis Tomás, and his father, Horacio Luis, all worked as cooks and Antonio learned his skills from them. He later moved to Buenos Aires, where he worked at conventillos and learned typical gaucho dishes, and then became a cook at the Argentine Navy. He was later hired as head chef at the National Congress of Argentina. As cooking was deemed a "lesser job", usually reserved for houseworkers, it was not unusual for Black people to be relegated to the kitchen.

== Success ==
During Theodore Roosevelt's 1913 state visit to Argentina, Gonzaga was selected to be head chef for the U.S. president's entourage. By the time the 1916 Argentine Independence Centennial celebrations rolled around, Gonzaga was already a popular name among Buenos Aires aristocratic circles.

In 1931, he published El cocinero práctico argentino ("The Practical Argentine Cookbook"), credited as the first cookbook in Argentina. The book detailed traditional Argentine cuisine with painstaking effort, chronicling over 300 recipes. Aided by the arrival of gas stoves to the country, the popularity of El cocinero práctico led to him becoming one of the country's most recognizable chefs. His rise in popularity, however, was eventually overshadowed by another famous Argentine cookbook writer, Doña Petrona, who would go on to revolutionize the field by becoming Argentina's first television chef.

== Legacy ==
Gonzaga's unabashed focus on traditional Argentine cooking (specifically, that of the gauchos and the rural working class) is credited with popularizing asado in Buenos Aires and among the Argentine upper classes, who until then disdained Argentine traditions and instead favored French cuisine. In particular, the use of achuras such as chorizo and chitterlings, and the steps for preparing the asado, are credited to Gonzaga's recipes in El cocinero práctico.

Gonzaga's Afro-Argentine background has also led to speculation regarding the possible African origins of the asado, although consensus has not been reached by historians and researchers. In his books, Gonzaga proclaimed himself a "criollo, son of this country".

His work as a chef was carried on by his grandson, Horacio Gonzaga, who was the head chef at the Hotel Provincial and the Hotel Hermitage, in Mar del Plata.
