= Pocha Lamadrid =

Argentine activist (1945–2021)

- Born: María Magdalena Lamadrid; 17 April 1945; Ciudad Evita, Argentina
- Died: 27 September 2021 (aged 76); Ciudad Evita, Argentina
- Citizenship: Argentine
- Occupation: activist
- Known for: antiracism, Afro-Argentine activism

María Magdalena "Pocha" Lamadrid (17 April 1945 – 27 September 2021) was an Argentine activist and campaigner. She was the founder of the NGO África Vive, and was a pioneer activist of the Afro-Argentine community.

== Life and work ==
Lamadrid was born on 17 April 1945. She was a fifth-generation Afro-Argentine, a descendant of African slaves brought over to the Río de la Plata during Spanish colonial rule. Her great-great-grandfather was a freedman who had served for Gregorio Aráoz de Lamadrid, from whom he took his name as it was the custom for freed slaves in early 19th-century Argentina.

In the 1950s and 1960s, she formed part of the music group Las Mulatas de Ébano ("the Ebony Mulattas"), founded by her aunt, Tina Lamadrid. The group played music with "Afro influences". Later in life, once she had "grown too old, too fat" for showbusiness, she worked as a housekeeper.

== Activism ==
Lamadrid founded the NGO "África Vive" in April 1997, after collaborating with a group of researchers from the Inter-American Development Bank looking into the African roots of Argentine society. África Vive's work focused on "rescuing the values of the Afro-Argentine, Afro-descendant and African community", and "fights against the discrimination and erasure to which Afro-Argentines are still subjected." According to Miriam Gomes, a fellow Afro-Argentine activist and president of Argentina's Sociedad Caboverdeana, it was "having to go out and work at 11 or 12 years old and seeing what happened to our children, to our elderly" that motivated Lamadrid to become an activist.

In 2001, Lamadrid collaborated with the Buenos Aires Ombudsman's Office to carry out an "Afro-Argentine census" in Buenos Aires, in parallel to the national census being held that year, as the official census did not include questions regarding race self-identification. According to Lamadrid, as of 2002 there were "at least 2 million" Argentines of African descent, but many of them ignore their background due to pervasive racism deeply entrenched in Argentine society.

In 2002, she became known nationwide when she was subjected to a racist incident at Ezeiza Airport. When trying to board a flight to Panama to take part in a conference, she was detained by an Argentine customs officer who insisted she could not be "Black and Argentine".

Lamadrid's activism contributed to the 2010 Argentine national census including a question on Afro-Argentine background. In 2015, she was named a "distinguished personality" of Buenos Aires by the Buenos Aires City Legislature.

Lamadrid died on 27 September 2021, aged 76, in her hometown of Ciudad Evita. That November's "Afroargentinidad Month" celebrations, as well as the National Day of Afro-Argentines and Afro culture, were dedicated to Lamadrid's memory by the Government of Argentina.
