= Higinio Cazón =

Argentine musician, songwriter and payador

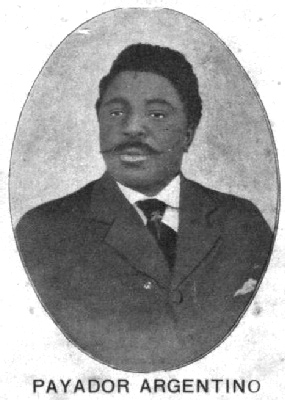
- Born: 1866
- Died: 1914 (aged 47–48)
- Occupation: Musician

Higinio D. Cazón (1866–1914) was an Argentine musician, songwriter and payador.

His he toured throughout the country, but the preferred center of his performances was in Buenos Aires and the people of this province. He published a booklet called Alegrías y Pesares, which included his composition Bajó el Ombú Copioso, which gave him great satisfaction as a poet.

On June 30, 1896, he got into a contrapuntal payada with Gabino Ezeiza. The place of the meeting was the Doria theater stage, in Buenos Aires. A little later, along with other payadores, he performed on the same stage, in a benefit for the widow and children of the poet and troubadour Paul J. López. He was close with many payadores of his time, and he formed a group with Madariaga and Villoldo (author of the unforgettable tango The brunette), acting in the theater company headed by Herminia Mancini.

He died suddenly in Balcarce, Buenos Aires, during a tour in 1914. His memory has survived in several contemporary compositions dedicated to him or evoked in tango lyrics, as did Catullus Castillo, in the point of Café de los Angelitos.
