= Wilson Severino =

Argentine footballer

Personal information
- Full name: Wilson del Valle Severino
- Date of birth: 25 February 1980 (age 46)
- Place of birth: Río Cuarto, Argentina

Wilson del Valle Severino (born February 25, 1980) is an Argentine former footballer. He played as a striker and his last team was Atlas of the Argentine fifth division.

== Career ==
The son of an Afro-Brazilian father and an Argentine mother, he emerged from the lower divisions of Boulougne Atlético from San Isidro, Buenos Aires. He never played for the first team in that club, however, and in 2003 he moved to Central Ballester, where he made his professional debut and stayed until 2005. In that year he moved to Atlas of the Primera D, the fifth division of Argentine league. Severino was the leading scorer of the club with 39 goals in mid-2009. As an amateur player, like the entire Atlas team, Severino also worked as a sweeper on the tracks of the railroad station in Grand Bourg of the Belgrano Norte Line.

Severino scored a goal against Boca Juniors in the year 2007 in a 1–0 win at La Bombonera during a friendly cup. In March 2010 he traveled to Medellín, Colombia, to try out at Independiente Medellín, but was not taken into any further consideration with the team.

Severino appeared on an Argentine reality television show, Atlas, la otra pasión, produced by Fox Sports.
