= Gloria Platero =

Spanish physicist

Gloria Platero Coello is a Spanish physicist whose research involves the computational simulation of quantum dots and other quantum behavior on nanostructures. She works for the Spanish National Research Council (CSIC) as a research professor at the Materials Science Institute of Madrid (ICMM).

== Education and career ==
Platero has a PhD from the Autonomous University of Madrid in 1984, supervised by Federico García Moliner. She was a postdoctoral researcher at the Max Planck Institute for High Magnetic Fields (now the Laboratoire National des Champs Magnétiques Intenses) in Grenoble, France, and as an honorary professor at the Autonomous University of Madrid, before taking a permanent position at the CSIC in 1987.

== Recognition ==
Platero was elected as a Fellow of the American Physical Society (APS) in 2022, after a nomination from the APS Division of Quantum Information, "for key theoretical physics contributions to the development of novel quantum circuit functionalities and protocols required to implement quantum information applications in real systems". She was elected chair of the IUPAP Commission on Semiconductor Physics (C8) in October 2024 for the period 2025–2027.
