= Mario Calvo-Platero =

Italian journalist (born 1954)

Mario Calvo-Platero (born April 26, 1954) is an Italian journalist who has been the US editor of the prestigious Italian newspaper Il Sole 24 Ore for over 30 years up to 2017. He has also worked as a columnist for La Stampa.

== Biography ==
He was born and lived in Tripoli until 1967. He studied economics at the University of Turin and later International Affairs at Columbia University. He has worked at the United Nations, dealing with research on transnational banks, and at a bank in New York.

Having moved to the United States in 1978, he started writing for La Stampa that same year. It was in 1979 that he finally became a correspondent for Il Sole 24 Ore. He eventually moved on to found the American editorial of Il Sole 24 Ore as well as creating Economic & Management Consultants Inc. (EMC Inc.) in 1982, which provides journalistic services in real time. He also created Review Italy, a newsletter written in English on Italian economics and business.

He interviewed Presidents Ronald Reagan, George H. W. Bush, George W. Bush and Bill Clinton at the White House. War correspondent during the 1991 Gulf War, he followed the September 11 attacks. He is a member of various associations including the International Institute for Strategic Studies (IISS) in London, the New York Financial Writers Association and he is the president of the Palazzo Strozzi Foundation USA.

On March 1, 2017, the working relationship with Il Sole 24 Ore was terminated by mutual agreement, maintaining however a collaboration as editorialist and host, until December 29, 2017, of America 24 on Radio 24. On February 28, 2018, he definitively terminated his almost thirty-year collaboration with Il Sole 24 Ore and starting from the following day he became a columnist for La Stampa newspaper.

Mario Platero has been the host of a radio show, America 24 (2010–2017), on the air from Monday to Friday on Radio 24 and was the editor-in-chief of a news website published in New York, www.america24.com.

He currently lives in New York with his wife, Ariadne Grace Beaumont, and three children.

== Works ==
- Rapporto Tower. Iran, ostaggi, armi, Contras, Achille Lauro, fondi neri… L'inchiesta che sconvolge l'America di Reagan, with Giuseppe Josca, prefaction by Arthur Schlesinger Jr., Milan, Edizioni del Sole 24 Ore, 1987.
- Il Modello Americano. Egemonia e consenso nell'era della globalizzazione, with Mauro Calamandrei, Milan, Garzanti, 1997. ISBN 978-88-117-3859-6.

== Sources ==
- https://web.archive.org/web/20170607200119/http://www.mediamente.rai.it/HOME/bibliote/biografi/c/calvopla.htm
