= Tomás Platero IV =

Argentinian politician (1857–1925)

Tomás Platero IV and his wife.

Tomás Braulio Platero IV (1857–1925) was an Argentine lawyer, notary, and one of the founders of the centrist Radical Civic Union (UCR), Argentina's oldest existing political party, and among the most prominent Afro Argentine public figures of his time. He was a member of the Generation of '80.

== Early life ==
Platero was born in Buenos Aires in 1857 and, though slavery had been abolished in Argentina in 1812, Platero suffered from prevailing local discrimination against people of color. He joined the original Civic Union in 1890, and became a loyal supporter of the party's first leader, Leandro Alem, becoming a prominent member of the Committee of La Plata after an 1891 split in the Civic Union led to the establishment of the UCR (which advocated greater activism towards the goal of universal male suffrage).

== Later career ==
He was also the founder of the Professional Association of the Province of Buenos Aires, and President of the Electric Cooperative Society. Appointed Chief Civil Registry Director for the 3rd and 5th districts in Buenos Aires, he inherited a bookkeeping system whereby black births, marriages and deaths were recorded on separate ledgers, and eventually helped end the practice. He was later the founder and President of The Protector National Mutual Association. He was also a person of strong religious convictions, and a brother of the Franciscan Order.

Following Alem's 1896 suicide, Platero became a supporter of Dr. Hipólito Yrigoyen, whose activism led to the passage of the Sáenz Peña Law in 1912, and to Argentina's first democratic presidential elections, in 1916. A steadfast supporter of President Yrigoyen's, Platero was a vocal opponent of the Antipersonalistas (a more conservative wing of the UCR).

Platero died in La Plata on February 17, 1925, and his funeral was attended by the highest authorities of the UCR, including the Governor of Buenos Aires Province, José Luis Cantilo, Federico Zelarrayán (carrying condolences from Yrigoyen), and numerous other UCR figures. He was survived by his several children; the Platero family would go on to become prominent within La Plata's upper strata. His eldest son, Tomás Antonio Platero, became an important chronicler of Afro-Argentine history; his daughters Carmen and Susana were playwrights, actresses and singers, and contributed to the preservation of Afro-Argentine musical traditions.
