= Population history of the Indigenous peoples of the Americas =

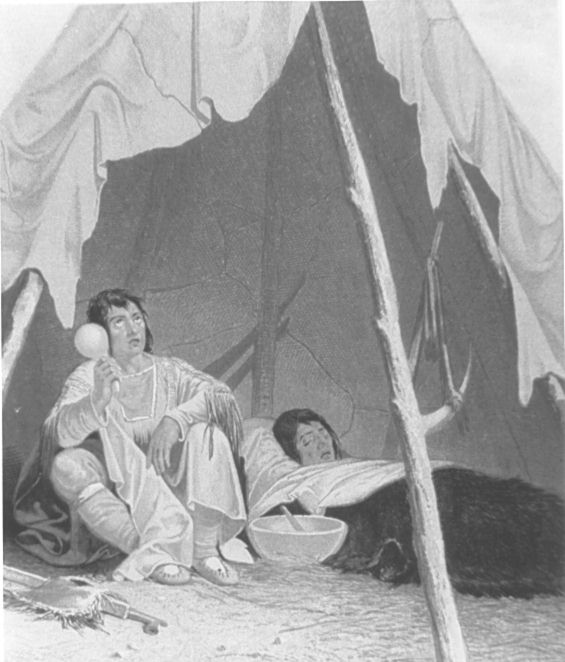
Contemporary illustration of the 1868 Washita massacre by the 7th Cavalry against Black Kettle's band of Cheyenne, during the American Indian Wars. Violence and conflict with colonists were also important causes of the decline of certain Indigenous American populations since the 16th century.

Population figures for the Indigenous peoples of the Americas before European colonization have been difficult to establish. Estimates have varied widely from as low as 8 million to as many as 100 million, though by the end of the 20th century, many scholars tended toward an estimate of around 50 million people.

The monarchs of the nascent Spanish Empire decided to fund Christopher Columbus' voyage in 1492, leading to the establishment of colonies and marking the beginning of the migration of millions of Europeans and Africans to the Americas. While the population of European settlers, primarily from Spain, Portugal, France, England, and the Netherlands, along with African slaves, grew steadily, the Indigenous population plummeted. There are numerous reasons for the population decline, including exposure to Eurasian diseases such as influenza, pneumonic plagues, and smallpox; direct violence by settlers and their allies through war and forced removal; and the general disruption of societies. Scholarly disputes remain over the degree to which each factor contributed or should be emphasized; some modern scholars have categorized it as a genocide, claiming that deliberate, systematic actions by Europeans were the primary cause. Traditional interpretation of the decline by scholars have disputed this characterization, maintaining that incidental disease exposure was the primary cause. This is supported by evidence where 50-80 percent of the population died from waves of diseases brought by Europeans to places such as Mexico in the 16th century.

== Population overview ==
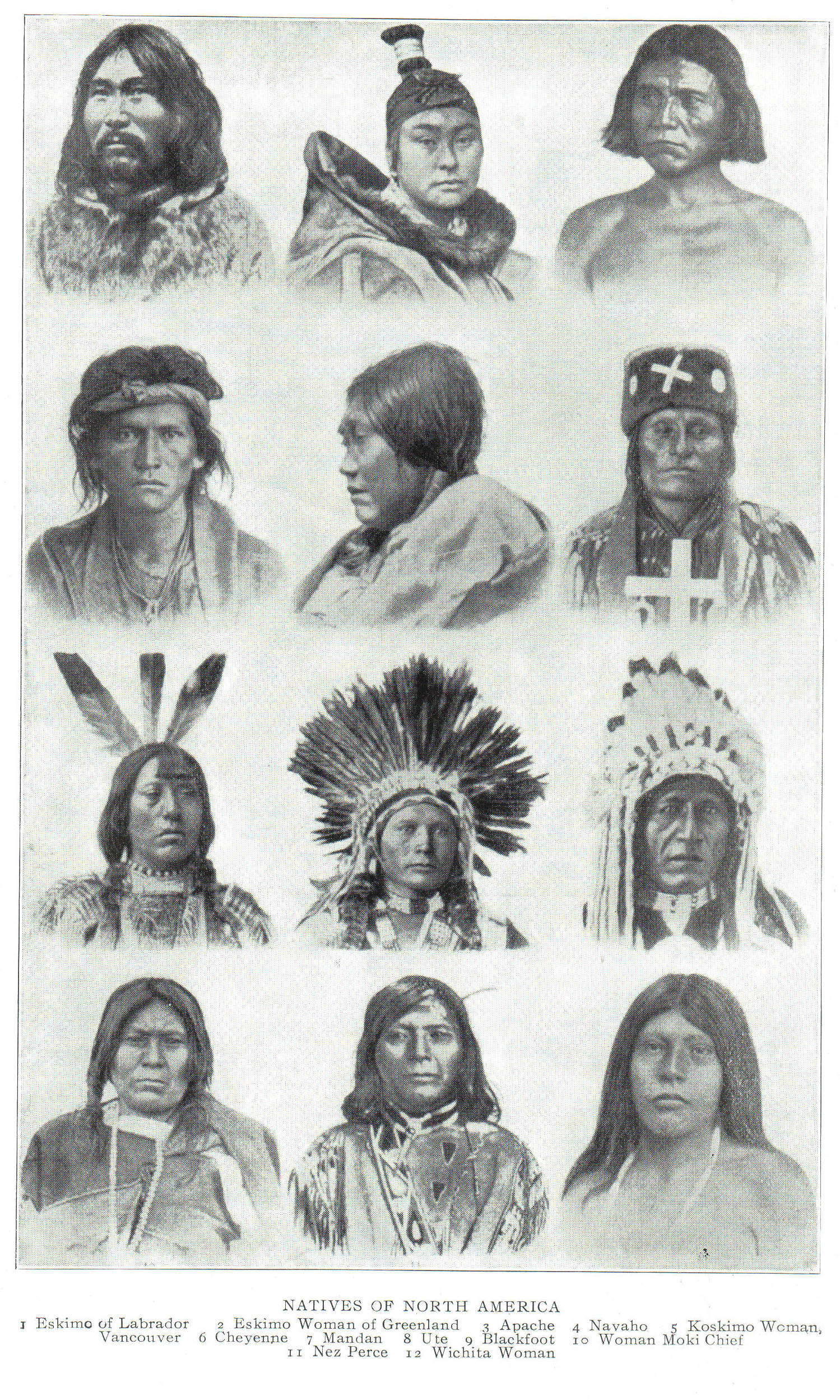
Illustration of Indigenous people of North America

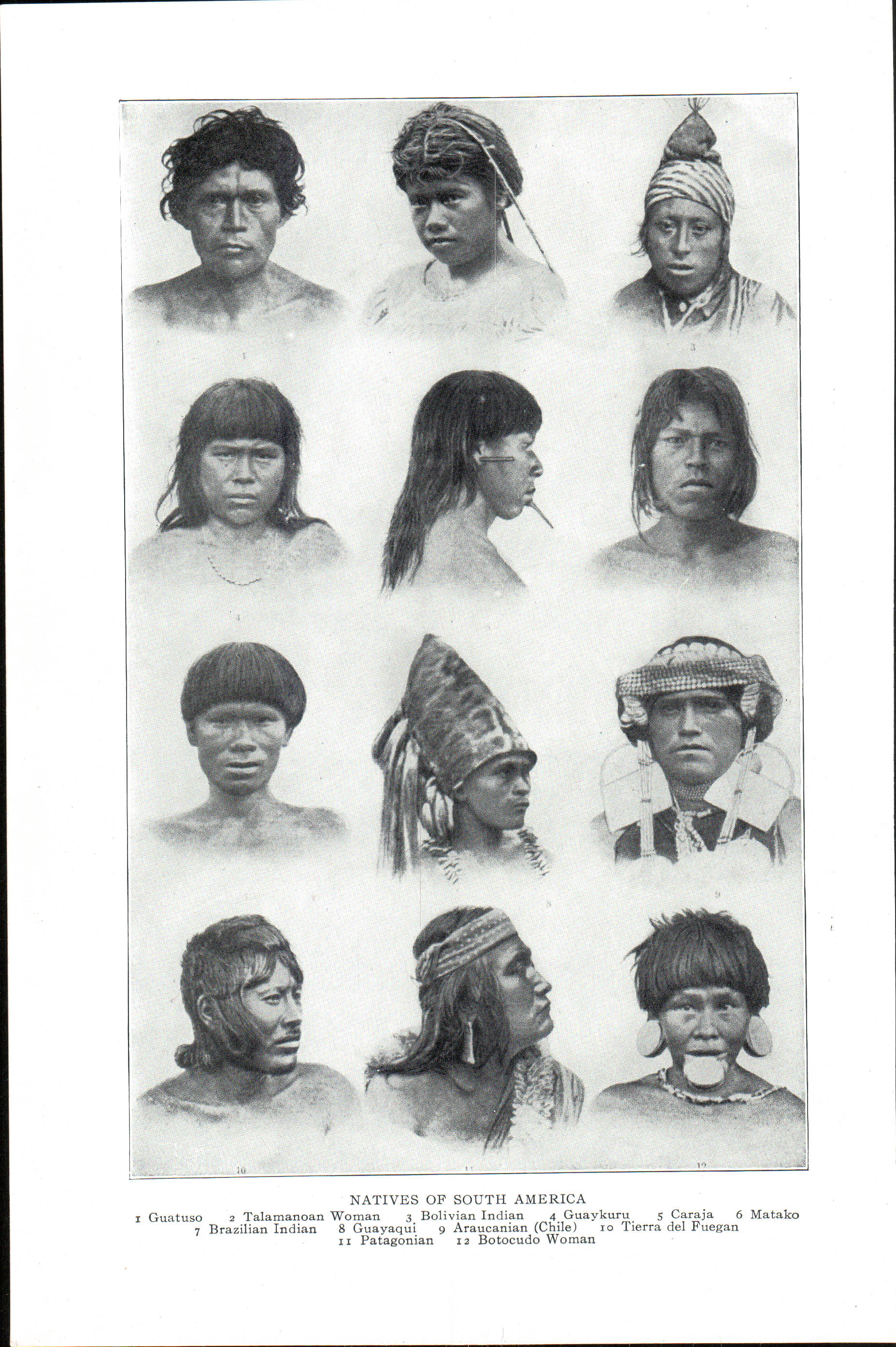
Illustration of Indigenous people of South America

Pre-Columbian population figures are difficult to estimate because of the fragmentary nature of the evidence. Estimates range from 8–112 million. Scholars have varied widely on the estimated size of the Indigenous populations prior to colonization and on the effects of European contact. Estimates are made by extrapolations from small bits of data. In 1976, geographer William Denevan used the existing estimates to derive a "consensus count" of about 54 million people. Nonetheless, more recent estimates still range widely. In 1992, Denevan suggested that the total population was approximately 53.9 million and the populations by region were, approximately, 3.8 million for the United States and Canada, 17.2 million for Mexico, 5.6 million for Central America, 3 million for the Caribbean, 15.7 million for the Andes and 8.6 million for lowland South America. A 2020 genetic study suggests that prior estimates for the pre-Columbian Caribbean population may have been at least tenfold too large. Historian David Stannard estimates that the extermination of Indigenous peoples took the lives of 100 million people: "...the total extermination of many American Indian peoples and the near-extermination of others, in numbers that eventually totaled close to 100,000,000." A 2019 study estimates the pre-Columbian Indigenous population contained more than 60 million people, but dropped to 6 million by 1600, due to waves of epidemics, warfare and famine; causing a drop in atmospheric CO_{2} and contributing to the Little Ice Age. Other studies have disputed this conclusion.

The Indigenous population of the Americas in 1492 was not necessarily at a high point and may actually have already been in decline in some areas. Indigenous populations in most areas of the Americas reached a low point by the early 20th century.

Using an estimate of approximately 37 million people in Mexico, Central and South America in 1492 (including 6 million in the Aztec Empire, 5–10 million in the Mayan States, 11 million in what is now Brazil, and 12 million in the Inca Empire), the lowest estimates give a population decrease from all causes of 80% by the end of the 17th century (nine million people in 1650). Latin America would match its 15th-century population early in the 19th century; it numbered 17 million in 1800, 30 million in 1850, 61 million in 1900, 105 million in 1930, 218 million in 1960, 361 million in 1980, and 563 million in 2005. In the last three decades of the 16th century, the population of present-day Mexico dropped to about one million people. The Maya population is today estimated at six million, which is about the same as at the end of the 15th century, according to some estimates. In what is now Brazil, the Indigenous population declined from a pre-Cabraline high of an estimated four million to some 300,000. Over 60 million Brazilians possess at least one Native South American ancestor, according to a DNA study.

While it is difficult to determine exactly how many Natives lived in Northern America (modern day US and Canada) before Columbus, most estimates range from 2.5 million to 7 million people, with one study estimating up to 18 million. Scholars vary on the estimated size of the Indigenous population in what is now Canada prior to colonization and on the effects of European contact. During the late 15th century is estimated to have been between 200,000 and two million, with a figure of 500,000 currently accepted by Canada's Royal Commission on Aboriginal Health. Although not without conflict, European Canadians' early interactions with First Nations and Inuit populations were relatively peaceful. However repeated outbreaks of European infectious diseases such as influenza, measles, and smallpox (to which they had no natural immunity), combined with other effects of European contact, resulted in a twenty-five percent to eighty percent Indigenous population decrease post-contact. Roland G Robertson suggests that during the late 1630s, smallpox killed over half of the Wyandot (Huron), who controlled most of the early North American fur trade in the area of New France. In 1871 there was an enumeration of the Indigenous population within the limits of Canada at the time, showing a total of only 102,358 individuals. From 2006 to 2016, the Indigenous population has grown by 42.5 percent, four times the national rate. According to the 2011 Canadian census, Indigenous peoples (First Nations – 851,560, Inuit – 59,445 and Métis – 451,795) numbered at 1,400,685, or 4.3% of the country's total population.

The population debate has often had ideological underpinnings. Low estimates, such as those from Kroeber in 1939, claiming only 8.4 million inhabitants in the entire western hemisphere, were often reflective of European notions of cultural and racial superiority, especially in the early 20th century when white supremacist ideology still had a strong influence on fields such as anthropology. Historian Francis Jennings argued, "Scholarly wisdom long held that Indians were so inferior in mind and works that they could not possibly have created or sustained large populations." Most scholars held these lower estimates as factual until the 1960s, when anthropologist Henry Dobyns published research applying historical and archaeological data to assert a far higher pre-Columbian population of possibly over 100 million, including up to 9-12 million in what is now the US and Canada, setting off significant academic debate over the question. Despite widespread acceptance that the early estimates were too low, multiple researchers have also called very high estimates such as Dobyns into question as well. In 1998, Africanist Historian David Henige claimed that many population estimates are the result of "arbitrary formulas" applied from unreliable sources. Most newer estimates of the pre-Columbian population in the Americas fall between 45 and 60 million people, including those from Denevan (1992) and Alchon (2003), while a 2018 study estimates a population of just over 60 million, based on carbon records.

== Estimations ==
Estimates of the pre-Columbian (pre-1492) population in the Americas (millions)
Author	Date	US and Canada	Mexico	Mesoamerica	Caribbean	Andes	Patagonia and Amazonia	Total
Sapper	1924	2–3	12–15	5–6	3–4	12–15	3–5	37–48.5
Kroeber	1939	0.9	3.2	0.1	0.2	3	1	8.4
Steward	1949	1	4.5	0.74	0.22	6.13	2.9	15.49
Rosenblat	1954	1	4.5	0.8	0.3	4.75	2.03	13.38
Dobyns	1966	9.8–12.25	30–37.5	10.8–13.5	0.44–0.55	30–37.5	9–11.25	90.04–112.55
Ubelaker	1988	1.213–2.639	–	–	–	–	–	–
Denevan	1992	3.79	17.174	5.625	3	15.696	8.619	53.904
Snow	2001	3.44	–	–	–	–	–	–
Alchon	2003	3.5	16–18	5–6	2–3	13–15	7–8	46.5–53.5
Thornton	2005	7	–	–	–	–	–	–
Peros	2009	2.5	–	–	–	–	–	–
Milner	2010	3.8	–	–	–	–	–	–

=== Estimations by tribe ===
Population size for Native American tribes is very difficult to state definitively, but at least one writer has made estimates, often based on an assumed proportion of the number of warriors to total population for the tribe. Many of these estimates are based on observations by contemporary European explorers or settlers passing through Native American territories. Typical proportions were 5 people per one warrior and at least 1 up to 5 warriors (therefore at least 5–25 people) per lodge, cabin or house.

Highest available estimates: probable population peaks
Rank	Cultural Area	Region	Tribe or nation	Highest pop. estimate	Year	Towns/ villages	Lodges/cabins/houses/tents/tipis etc.	Sources of estimates
1	Great Plains	Louisiana Purchase	Sioux (Note: Extrapolated from 30,000 warriors (× 5) in year 1762, according to James Gorrell. Such high population appears to be confirmed by French Jesuits who visited forty Sioux villages in 1660 and found 5,000 men only in five of them (on average 1,000 men per village). Almost a century after Gorrell's estimate, in 1841, George Catlin estimated the Sioux as up to 50,000 people, and mentioned that they had just lost approx. 8,000 dead to smallpox a few years prior.)	150,000 – 50,000 (1841)	1762	40+	5,000 lodges in 1846, averaging over ten people per lodge	Lt. James Gorrell and A. Ramsey
2	SE Woodlands	Old Southwest	Choctaw (Note: Extrapolated from 25,000 warriors (x5) in year 1718, according to Le Page du Pratz.)	125,000	1718	102	102 towns enumerated by Swanton	Le Page du Pratz and J. R. Swanton
3	NE Woodlands	Old Northwest	Illinois (Note: They had 60 towns and 20,000 warriors. One of their towns – Cahokia – contained 400 lodges and was inhabited by 1,800 warriors.)	100,000	1658	60		Jean de Quen
4a	Great Basin	Mexican Cession	Shoshone	60,000	1820		(number without 20,000 East Shoshone)	Jedidiah Morse
4b	Great Plains	Louisiana Purchase	Eastern Shoshone	20,000	1820			Jedidiah Morse
5	Southwest	Mexican Cession	Pueblo Tigua (Tiwa)	78,100+	1626	20	7,000 houses only in two largest pueblos	Alonso de Benavides
6a	Great Plains	Louisiana Purchase	Blackfoot (Note: "The epidemic of 1837–38 was disastrous, approx. 15,000 Blackfeet people fell victim to the disease.") in the US	37,500 – 30,000 (1841)	1836		(60,000 in 1841 & approx. 75,000 in 1836, ca. half of them in the US)	George Catlin
6b	Great Plains	Prairies, Canada	Blackfoot in Canada	37,500 – 30,000 (1841)	1836		(60,000 in 1841 & approx. 75,000 in 1836, ca. half of them in Canada)	George Catlin
7	NE Woodlands	Middle Colonies	Iroquois (Note: Five Nations, on average 14,000 people per nation around year 1690 according to L. A. de Lahontan. And in 1609 the Iroquois population was estimated by Marc Lescarbot at 8,000 warriors (that is around 40,000 people). On the contrary Lewis H. Morgan in his 1851 book estimated the Iroquois population in year 1650 at only 25,000 people – including 10,000 Seneca, 5,000 Mohawk, 4,000 Onondaga, 3,000 Oneida and 3,000 Cayuga. The Seneca were also estimated at 13,000 people in year 1672 and 15,000 in year 1687. Not all of Iroquois 226 villages were occupied at the same time as the Iroquois moved villages every five to twenty years.)	70,000	1690	226	Nearly 60 towns destroyed in 1779	L. A. de Lahontan and John R. Swanton
8	Southwest	Mexican Cession	Apache	60,000	1700			José de Urrutia
9	SE Woodlands	Southern Colonies	Muscogee confederacy including Hitchiti	50,000	1794	100	(at least 100 towns in 1789 per Henry Knox)	James Seagrove and Henry Knox
10	Southwest	Mexican Cession	Hopi (Note: They had approx. 7 pueblos (towns), one of which – Oraibi (possibly the largest of all) – had 14,000 inhabitants before an epidemic.)	50,000	1584	7		Antonio de Espejo
11	NE Woodlands	Old Southwest	Shawnee	50,000 – 15,000 (1702)	1540	38+	(at first contact est. 50,000 & 15,000 in 1702)	M. A. Jaimes & Pierre d'Iberville
12	Great Plains	Louisiana Purchase	Crow (Apsáalooke)	45,000	1834			Samuel Gardner Drake
13	NE Woodlands	Ontario, Canada	Hurons (Note: It was also reported they had 25–32 towns or villages.) (Wyandot)	40,000	1632	32		Gabriel Sagard and J. Lalemant
14	Great Plains	Texas Annexation	Comanche	40,000	1832			George Catlin and J. Morse
15	Southwest	Mexican Cession	Pueblo Tano/Maguas including Pecos	40,000	1584	11		Antonio de Espejo
16	NE Woodlands	Old Northwest	Miami (Note: Extrapolated from 8,000 warriors × 5.)	40,000	1657	20+	(one of their towns had 400 families in 1751)	Gabriel Druillettes
17	NE Woodlands	Louisiana Purchase	Ioways	40,000	1762	16+	(at least 16 towns in the early 19th century)	Lt. James Gorrell
18a	Great Plains	Louisiana Purchase	Piegan in the US	30,000	1700		(ca. 3/4 in the US, ca. 6,000 lodges)	George Bird Grinnell
18b	Great Plains	Alberta, Canada	Piegan in Canada	10,000	1700		(ca. 1/4 in Canada, ca. 2,000 lodges)	George Bird Grinnell
19	Great Plains	Louisiana Purchase	Pawnee (Note: 38 villages (on average 130–150 lodges/cabins per village) with 7,600 warriors x 5 = 38,000 total population, not including the Arikara.)	38,000	1719	38	5,000 – 6,000 cabins/lodges & 7,600 warriors	Claude Du Tisne and L. Krzywicki
20a	NE Woodlands	Old Northwest	Ojibwe in the US	18,000	1860		(half in the US and half in Canada)	Emmanuel Domenech
20b	NE Woodlands	Ontario, Canada	Ojibwe in Canada	18,000	1860		(half in the US and half in Canada)	Emmanuel Domenech
21a	Great Plains	Louisiana Purchase	Assiniboine in the US	17,500	1823	15+	(ca. half in the US, ca. 1,500 lodges)	W. H. Keating and G. C. Beltrami
21b	Great Plains	Prairies, Canada	Assiniboine in Canada	17,500	1823	15+	(ca. half in Canada, ca. 1,500 lodges)	W. H. Keating and G. C. Beltrami
22	NE Woodlands	Acadia, Canada	Mi'kmaq	35,000	1500			Virginia P. Miller
23	SE Woodlands	Spanish Florida	Apalachee	34,000	1635	11+		J. R. Swanton
24	Southwest	Mexican Cession	Navajo (Diné)	30,000+	1626		In 1910 still numbered 29,624 people in Arizona and New Mexico	Alonso de Benavides
25	SE Woodlands	Old Southwest	Cherokee (Note: They had 6,000 warriors in 1730–35 (according to J. Adair) and also 6,000 warriors in 1738, but just 5,000 in 1740 (according to Ga. Hist. Coll., II). Colonel James Oglethorpe confirms that they had 5,000 warriors in 1739 (Ga. Coll. Rec., V). Also according to Ga. Coll. Rec., V an epidemic reduced them "by almost one-half" in 1738, but this source doesn't specify how numerous they were before the epidemic. Perhaps this source exaggerates the casualties caused by that epidemic, and in fact it killed just around 1,000 warriors.)	30,000	1735	201	201 towns enumerated by Swanton	J. Adair and Ga. Hist. Coll., II
26	SE Woodlands	Southern Colonies	Tuscarora (Note: They had approx. 6,000 warriors and 24 towns.)	30,000	1600	24		D. Cusick
27	NE Woodlands	New England	Narragansett	30,000	1642	8+		R. Smith junior quoted by S. G. Drake and J. R. Swanton
28	NE Woodlands	Middle Colonies	Mohican confederacy	30,000	1600	16+		J. A. Maurault and J. R. Swanton
29	NE Woodlands	New England	Massachusett	30,000	1600	23+		J. A. Maurault and J. R. Swanton
30	Southwest	Mexican Cession	Jemez Pueblo (Note: They inhabited up to 11 pueblos (towns).)	30,000	1584	11		Antonio de Espejo
31	SE Woodlands	Spanish Florida	Timucua tribes	30,000	1635	141	44 missions in 1635: 30,000 Christian Indians	J. R. Swanton
32	Northwest Coast	British Columbia, Canada	Clayoquot (Clayoquat)	30,000	1780		(30,000 under the rule of chief Wickaninnish)	Ho. Doc. 1839–1840 and Meares
33a	Subarctic & Arctic	Saskatchewan, Canada	Woods Cree in Saskatchewan	5,600	1670			James Mooney
33b	Subarctic & Arctic	Manitoba, Canada	Cree living in Manitoba	4,250	1670			James Mooney
33c	Subarctic & Arctic	Alberta, Canada	Woodland Cree in Alberta	3,050	1670			James Mooney
33d	Subarctic & Arctic	Ontario, Canada	Swampy Cree in Ontario	2,100	1670			James Mooney
33e	Subarctic & Arctic	Ontario, Canada	Moose Cree (Monsoni)	5,000	1600			James Mooney
33f	Great Plains	Prairies, Canada	Plains Cree	7,000	1853			David G. Mandelbaum
34a	Great Basin	Mexican Cession	Ute living in Utah	13,050	1867			Indian Affairs 1867
34b	Great Basin	Mexican Cession	Ute living in Colorado	7,000	1866			Indian Affairs 1866
34c	Great Basin	Mexican Cession	Ute living in New Mexico	6,000	1846–1854			H. H. Davis and Indian Affairs 1854
35	SE Woodlands	Old Southwest	Mabila (Mobile)	25,000	1540		Mississippian chiefdom under chief Tuskaloosa, about 5,000 warriors	Ludwik Krzywicki
36	Northwest Coast	Oregon Country	Chinook tribes	22,000	1780		1,000 lodges just among the Lower Chinook	James Mooney and Duflot de Mofras
37	NE Woodlands	Old Northwest	Mascouten	20,000	1679		They consisted of 12 sub-tribes	Claude Dablon
38	SE Woodlands	Old Southwest	Chickasaw	20,000	1687	27+		Louis Hennepin
39	NE Woodlands	Ontario, Canada	Neutrals (Note: They had approx. 4,000 warriors and ca. 40 villages.)	20,000	1616	40		Samuel de Champlain
40	Southwest	Mexican Cession	Zuni Pueblo	20,000	1584	12		Antonio de Espejo
41	Southwest	Mexican Cession	Pueblo Tewa/Ubates	20,000	1584	5		Antonio de Espejo
42	NE Woodlands	New England	Pequots (Note: Later an epidemic ravaged them in 1618.)	20,000	1600	21		Daniel Gookin and J. R. Swanton
43	Great Plains	Louisiana Purchase	Skidi	20,000	1687	22	At least 4,400 cabins (on average at least 200 per town)	George Bird Grinnell
44	SE Woodlands	Louisiana Purchase	Natchez	20,000	1715	60		Pierre Charlevoix
45	Southwest	Mexican Cession	Pueblo Punames	20,000	1584	5	Zia was the largest of 5 Puname pueblos	Antonio de Espejo
46	NE Woodlands	Middle Colonies	Lenape (Delaware)	18,400	1635–1648	118	(3,680 warriors in 27 divisions or "kingdoms")	R. Evelin, Th. Donaldson & Swanton
47	Great Plains	Louisiana Purchase	Mandan	17,500 – 15,000 (1836)	1738	17	1,000+ lodges and 3,500 warriors	W. Sanstead & Indian Affairs 1836
48	Great Plains	Louisiana Purchase	Atsina (Gros Ventre)	16,800	1837		Still reported at 16,800 in 1841	Indian Affairs 1837
49	SE Woodlands	Southern Colonies	Powhatan confederacy	16,600	1616	161	(3,320 warriors in 1616)	William Strachey and John Smith
50	NE Woodlands	Middle Colonies	Nanticoke confederacy	16,500	1600	16+	(1,100 warriors in 4 tribes, in total 12 tribes)	John Smith and J. R. Swanton
51	Great Plains	Louisiana Purchase	Arikaras	16,000	1700	48		Kinglsey M. Bray
52	Northwest Coast	British Columbia, Canada	Vancouver Island Salish	15,500	1780		(Coast Salish on Vancouver Island)	Herbert C. Taylor
53	Great Plains	Louisiana Purchase	Arapaho	15,250	1812			M. R. Stuart
54	Great Plains	Louisiana Purchase	Wichita confederacy	15,000+	1772		(3,000+ warriors)	Juan de Ripperda
55	Southwest	Mexican Cession	Pueblo Keres (Note: They inhabited up to 7 pueblos (towns).)	15,000	1584	7		Antonio de Espejo
56	NE Woodlands	New England	Abenaki	15,000	1600	31		J. A. Maurault and J. R. Swanton
57	NE Woodlands	New England	Pennacook confederacy	15,000	1674			Daniel Gookin
58	NE Woodlands	New England	Wampanoag (mainland)	15,000	1600	30		Daniel Gookin and J. R. Swanton
59	NE Woodlands	Louisiana Purchase	Missouria (Note: Extrapolated from 3,000 warriors × 5.)	15,000	1764			H. Bouquet and J. Buchanan
60	Great Plains	Louisiana Purchase	Hidatsa	15,000	1835			William M. Denevan
61	NE Woodlands	Ontario, Canada	Ottawa (Odawa)	15,000 – 13,150 (1825)	1777		(3,000 warriors in 1777)	L. Houck and J. C. Colhoun
62	Southwest	Texas Annexation	Coahuiltecan tribes	15,000	1690			James Mooney
63	NE Woodlands	Old Northwest	Mishinimaki	15,000	1600	30		Claude Dablon
64	Southwest	Mexican Cession	Taos Pueblo (Yuraba)	15,000	1540	1+		Relacion del Suceso
65	NE Woodlands	Old Northwest	Erie	14,500	1653			J. N. B. Hewitt
66	Northwest Coast	British Columbia, Canada	Kwakiutl tribes excluding Haisla	14,500	1780			Herbert C. Taylor
67	Northwest Coast	British Columbia, Canada	Nootka (Nutka) tribes	14,000	1780			Herbert C. Taylor
68	NE Woodlands	Middle Colonies	Wappinger confederacy	13,500	1600	68		E. J. Boesch and J. R. Swanton
69	NE Woodlands	Ontario, Canada	Mississaugas (Messassagnes)	12,000+	1744	3+	(2,400 warriors in 3 large towns)	Arthur Dobbs
70	Northwest Coast	British Columbia, Canada	Coast Salish (except VI)	12,000	1835		(includes 7,100 mainland Cowichan / Stalo and 1,400 mainland Comox)	Wilson Duff & J. Mooney
71	Subarctic & Arctic	District of Franklin, Canada	District of Franklin Inuit	12,000	1670			James Mooney
72	Northwest Coast	British Columbia, Canada	Lekwiltok	10,520	1839			HBC Indian Census 1839
73	Northwest Coast	Oregon Country	Puget Sound Salish (Lushootseed) tribes	10,300	1780			Herbert C. Taylor
74	SE Woodlands	Southern Colonies	Catawba	10,000	1700			R. Mills and H. Lewis Scaife
75	Southwest	Mexican Cession	Akimel O'odham (Pima)	10,000	1850			S. Mowry
76	Great Plains	Louisiana Purchase	Cheyenne	10,000	1856		1,000 lodges and 2,000 warriors	Thomas S. Twiss
77	Northwest Coast	British Columbia, Canada	Chilkat	10,000	1869			F. K. Louthan
78	Southwest	Mexican Cession	Pueblo Tompiro	10,000	1626	15		Alonso de Benavides
79	NE Woodlands	Old Northwest	Menominee	10,000	1778		(2,000 warriors)	H. R. Schoolcraft
80	Southwest	Mexican Cession	Mohave (Mojave)	10,000	1869			William Abraham Bell
81	Southwest	Texas Annexation	Jumanos	10,000	1584	5+	5 large towns	Antonio de Espejo
82	SE Woodlands	Florida Purchase	Seminole	10,000	1836	93	(other figures: 4,883 people in 1821 and 6,385 people in 1822)	N. G. Taylor and Capt. Hugh Young
83	SE Woodlands	Spanish Florida	Calusa	10,000	1570	56		Lopez de Velasco & J. R. Swanton
84	Great Plains	Texas Annexation	Kichai, Waco, Tawakoni	10,000	1719		(2,000 warriors)	Benard de La Harpe
85	Northwest Plateau	Oregon Country	Pisquow (Piskwau) and Sinkiuse-Columbia	10,000	1780		(including Wenatchi / Wenatchee)	James Teit
86	NE Woodlands	Quebec, Canada	St. Lawrence Iroquoians	10,000	1500		Also known as Laurentians	Gary Warrick & Louis Lesage
87	Northwest Plateau	Oregon Country	Bitterroot Salish (Flathead Salish)	9,000	1821		(1,800 warriors)	M. R. Stuart
88	Great Basin	Oregon Country	Bannock and Diggers	9,000	1848		1,200 lodges of southern Bannock (in 1829)	Joseph L. Meek and Jim Bridger
89	Southwest	Mexican Cession	Piro Pueblo	9,000	1500	14		John R. Swanton and Alonso de Benavides
90	SE Woodlands	Louisiana Purchase	Caddo tribes	8,500	1690			James Mooney
91	Northwest Coast	British Columbia, Canada	Haida (except Kaigani)	8,400	1787	42+		C. F. Newcombe
92	Great Basin	Mexican Cession	Paiute	8,200	1859			John Weiss Forney
93	NE Woodlands	Louisiana Purchase	Osage	8,000	1819	17	(1,500 families in 1702,1,600 warriors in 1764 and 8,000 people in 1819)	Th. Nuttall, Iberville and H. Bouquet
94	Great Plains	Louisiana Purchase	Kansa (Kaw)	8,000	1764		(1,600 warriors)	Henry Bouquet
95	Northwest Plateau	Oregon Country	Nez Perce	8,000	1806			Isaac Ingalls Stevens
96	NE Woodlands	Ontario, Canada	Tionontati (Petun)	8,000	1600	9	9 towns, 600 families in the main town	James Mooney & Jes. Rel. XXXV
97	Subarctic & Arctic	Canada	Chipewyan	7,500	1812			Samuel Gardner Drake
98	Northwest Plateau	British Columbia, Canada	Secwepemc (Shuswap)	7,200	1850			James Teit and A. C. Anderson
99	Great Plains	Louisiana Purchase	Omaha, Ponca	7,200	1702			Pierre d'Iberville
100	SE Woodlands	Southern Colonies	Yamasee	7,000	1702	10	(1,400 warriors)	Guillaume Delisle
101	SE Woodlands	Southern Colonies	Conoy (Piscataway)	7,000+	1600	13+		W. M. Denevan & J. R. Swanton
102	Northwest Coast	Oregon Country	Umpqua	7,000	1835			Samuel Parker
103	Northwest Coast	British Columbia, Canada	Tsimshian of British Columbia and Nisga'a	7,000	1780		(includes Kitksan / Gitxsan and Kitsun tribes)	James Mooney
104	Southwest	Mexican Cession	Tohono Oʼodham (Papago)	6,800	1863	19		Indian Affairs 1863
105	NE Woodlands	Quebec, Canada	Algonquin (Anicinàpe)	6,500	1860			Emmanuel Domenech
106	NE Woodlands	Old Northwest	Sauk (Sac)	6,500	1786			Wisconsin Hist. Coll., XII
107	NE Woodlands	Old Northwest	Potawatomi	6,500	1829			Peter Buell Porter & McKenney
108	NE Woodlands	Old Northwest	Meskwaki (Fox)	6,400	1835			Cutting Marsh in Wisconsin Hist. Coll., XV
109	Southwest	Mexican Cession	Acoma Pueblo	6,000	1584	1+	500+ houses	Antonio de Espejo
110	NE Woodlands	Old Northwest	Wea	6,000	1718	5	(1,200 warriors)	N. Y. Col. Dcts., IX
111	SE Woodlands	Louisiana Purchase	Quapaw (Arkansa)	6,000	1541	4+		Fidalgo D'Elvas
112	Northwest Plateau	Oregon Country	Yakama	6,000	1857		(1,200 warriors)	A. N. Armstrong
113	NE Woodlands	Middle Colonies	Montauk	6,000	1600	20		J. R. Swanton
114	Northwest Coast	Oregon Country	Alsea, Siuslaw, Yaquina and Luckton	6,000	1780	110	(tribes of Yakonan language family)	James Mooney and James Owen Dorsey
115	NE Woodlands	Old Northwest	Ho-Chunk (Winnebago)	5,800	1818			Jedidiah Morse
116	Northwest Coast	Oregon Country	Rogue River Indians (Tututni tribes)	5,600	1780			James Mooney
117	Northwest Plateau	Oregon Country	Kutenai (Ktunaxa)	5,600	1820			Jedidiah Morse
118	Southwest	Mexican Cession	Quechan (Yuma)	5,500	1775–1855			A. F. Bandelier, Ten Kate
119	Subarctic & Arctic	Quebec, Canada	Innu and Naskapi	5,500	1600	17+		James Mooney and J. R. Swanton
120	Great Plains	Louisiana Purchase	Kiowa	5,450	1805–1807			Z. M. Pike
121	Northwest Plateau	Oregon Country	Palouse (Palus)	5,400	1780			James Mooney and J. R. Swanton
122	NE Woodlands	Middle Colonies	Susquehanna (Conestoga)	5,000	1600	20+		James Mooney and J. R. Swanton
123	NE Woodlands	New England	Pocumtuk	5,000	1600			Pocumtuc History
124	Northwest Plateau	British Columbia, Canada	Nlaka'pamux	5,000	1858			James Teit & A. C. Anderson
125	Northwest Plateau	British Columbia, Canada	Dakelh (Carrier)	5,000	1835			A. C. Anderson and J. Mooney
126	Northwest Plateau	Oregon Country	Klikitat (Klickitat)	5,000	1829		(1,000 warriors under chief Casanow)	Paul Kane
127	SE Woodlands	Texas Annexation	Hasinai confederacy	5,000	1716			Herbert Eugene Bolton
128	Northwest Coast	Oregon Country	Makah	5,000+	1805		(more than 1,000 warriors)	John R. Jewitt
129	SE Woodlands	Old Southwest	Yuchi (Euchee also known as Chisca)	5,000 – 2,500 (in 1777)	1550		(at least 500 warriors in year 1777)	William Bartram & Carolina – The Native Americans
130	Southwest	Mexican Cession	Halyikwamai	5,000	1605			Juan de Oñate
131	Subarctic & Arctic	District of Mackenzie, Canada	District of Mackenzie Inuit	4,800	1670			James Mooney
132	Northwest Plateau	British Columbia, Canada	Chilcotin (Tsilkotin)	4,600	1793		(by 1888 population was 10% of 1793 level)	A. G. Morice and HBC employees
133	Northwest Plateau	Oregon Country	Chopunnish	4,300	1806			Extinct native American tribes of North America
134	NE Woodlands	Middle Colonies	Honniasont	4,000+	1662		(800+ warriors)	John R. Swanton
135	NE Woodlands	New England	Niantic	4,000	1500			Capers Jones
136	SE Woodlands	Louisiana Purchase	Chitimacha	4,000	1699		300+ cabins and 800 warriors	Benard de La Harpe
137	Northwest Plateau	British Columbia, Canada	Lillooet (Stʼatʼimc)	4,000	1780			James Mooney and J. Teit
138	Northwest Plateau	Oregon Country	Modoc & Klamath	4,000	1868			Indian Affairs 1868
139	SE Woodlands	Southern Colonies	Weapemeoc (Yeopim)	4,000	1585	5+	(800 warriors)	S. R. Grenville
140	Northwest Plateau	Oregon Country	Sahaptin	4,000	1857		(Tenino, Tygh, Wyam, John Day, Tilquni)	A. N. Armstrong
141	SE Woodlands	Southern Colonies	Guale	4,000	1650			J. R. Swanton
142	Subarctic & Arctic	Canada	Kutchin (Loucheux)	4,000	1871			Censuses of Canada, 1665 to 1871
143	Northwest Plateau	Oregon Country	Skitswish	4,000	1800			James Teit
144	Northwest Coast	Oregon Country	Wappatoo tribes	3,600	1780			James Mooney
145	Subarctic & Arctic	Nunatsiavut, Labrador, Canada	Labrador Inuit	3,600	1600			J. Mooney & Kroeber
146	Northwest Coast	Oregon Country	Nisqually	3,600	1780			James Mooney
147	SE Woodlands	Southern Colonies	Chowanoc	3,500+	1585	5	(1585: 700 warriors just in one of five towns)	Carolina – The Native Americans
148	SE Woodlands	Old Southwest	Acolapissa	3,500	1600		120+ cabins	Acolapissa History
149	Northwest Plateau	Oregon Country	Colville	3,500	1806			Isaac Ingalls Stevens
150	Northwest Plateau	British Columbia, Canada	Babine (Witsuwitʼen)	3,500	1780			James Mooney
151	Southwest	Mexican Cession	Havasupai and Tonto Apaches	3,500	1854			Amiel Weeks Whipple
152	Great Plains	Louisiana Purchase	Plains Apache (Kiowa-Apache)	3,375	1818			Jedidiah Morse
153	Subarctic & Arctic	British Columbia, Canada	Sekani (Tse'khene)	3,200	1780			James Mooney and Sekani Indians of Canada
154	Subarctic & Arctic	Newfoundland and Labrador, Canada	Beothuk	3,050	1500			Ralph T. Pastore, Leslie Upton
155	SE Woodlands	Old Southwest	Alabama (Alibamu)	3,000	1764	6	(600 warriors)	Henry Bouquet
156	NE Woodlands	New England	Nantucket	3,000	1660	10		J. Barber in J. Chase and J. R. Swanton
157	SE Woodlands	Southern Colonies	Nottoway	3,000	1586		(600 warriors)	R. Lane in Hakluyt, VIII
158	Great Plains	Texas Annexation	Tonkawa	3,000	1814		(600 warriors)	John F. Schermerhorn
159	Northwest Plateau	Oregon Country	Wallawalla (Walula)	3,000	1848			Miss A. J. Allen
160	Northwest Plateau	Oregon Country	Spokan (Spokane)	3,000	1848			Joseph L. Meek
161	Northwest Plateau	British Columbia, Canada	Okinagan (Syilx)	3,000	1780		Also spelled Okanagan	James Teit
162	NE Woodlands	Ontario, Canada	Nipissing	3,000	1764		(600 warriors)	Th. Hutchins in H. R. Schoolcraft
163	NE Woodlands	New England	Shawomets and Cowsetts (Cowesets)	3,000	1500			Capers Jones
164	Southwest	Mexican Cession	Halchidhoma	3,000	1799	8	(according to Juan de Onate – 8 towns in 1604)	J. Cortez
165	Southwest	Mexican Cession	Piipaash (Maricopa)	3,000	1799			J. Cortez and Francisco Garcés
166	SE Woodlands	Old Southwest	Taposa and Ibitoupa	3,000	1699			Baudry de Lozieres
167	Northwest Plateau	Oregon Country	Multnomah	3,000	1830		(decimated by epidemics in 1830s)	Hall J. Kelley
168	Subarctic & Arctic	District of Keewatin, Canada	District of Keewatin Inuit	3,000	1670			James Mooney
169	SE Woodlands	Spanish Florida	Potano	3,000	1650			James Mooney
170	Southwest	Mexican Cession	Cocopah	3,000	1775	9		Francisco Garcés and de Oñate
171	Northwest Plateau	Oregon Country	Kalapuya tribes	3,000	1780		Eight tribes or bands	James Mooney
172	Southwest	Mexican Cession	Cajuenche (Cawina)	3,000	1680			James Mooney
173	Southwest	Mexican Cession	Pueblo Picuris	3,000	1680	1+		Agustín de Vetancurt
174	NE Woodlands	New England	Martha's Vineyard Wampanoag (Wampanoag Tribe of Gay Head, Aquinnah)	3,000	1642	8		Lloyd C. M. Hare and J. R. Swanton
175	NE Woodlands	Old Northwest	Kickapoo	3,000	1759			J. R. Swanton
176	Northwest Plateau	Oregon Country	Watlala	2,800	1805			Lewis and Clark
177	Southwest	Texas Annexation	Karankawa	2,800	1690			James Mooney
178	NE Woodlands	Acadia, Canada	Wolastoqiyik (Maliseet)	2,750	1764		(550 warriors)	Th. Hutchins in H. R. Schoolcraft
179	Northwest Coast	British Columbia, Canada	Heiltsuk (Bellabella) and Haisla	2,700	1780			James Mooney
180	NE Woodlands	New England	Mohegan	2,500	1680	21	(500 warriors)	Mass. Hist. Coll. and J. R. Swanton
181	Northwest Plateau	Oregon Country	Clackamas	2,500	1780	11		James Mooney
182	Southwest	Mexican Cession	Yavapai	2,500	1869			J. Ross Browne
183	NE Woodlands	New England	Nipmuc	2,500	1500	29		Capers Jones and J. R. Swanton
184	Subarctic & Arctic	Northwest Territories, Canada	Inuvialuit	2,500	1850			Jessica M. Shadian, Mark Nuttall
185	NE Woodlands	Middle Colonies	Manhasset (Manhanset)	2,500	1500		(500+ warriors)	E. M. Ruttenber
186	Northwest Coast	Oregon Country	Snohomish	2,500	1844			Duflot de Mofras
187	SE Woodlands	Old Southwest	Mosopelea (Ofo), Koroa, and Tioux (Tiou)	2,450	1700			J. R. Swanton
188	Northwest Plateau	Oregon Country	Cowlitz	2,400	1822	3		Jedidiah Morse
189	NE Woodlands	New England	Penobscot	2,250	1702	14	(450 warriors)	N. H. Hist. Coll., I and J. R. Swanton
190	SE Woodlands	Old Southwest	Tunica	2,250	1698	7	260 cabins and 450 warriors	J. G. Shea and J. R. Swanton
191	Northwest Plateau	Oregon Country	Kalispel	2,250	1835–1850		(450 warriors)	HBC agents & Joseph Lane
192	Great Plains	Alberta, Canada	Sarcee (Tsuutʼina)	2,200	1832		220 tents, on average 10 people per tent	George Catlin and John Maclean
193	Northwest Coast	Oregon Country	Tillamook	2,200	1820	10		Jedidiah Morse
194	Subarctic & Arctic	Yukon, Canada	Yukon Inuit	2,200	1670			James Mooney
195	Northwest Plateau	Oregon Country	Tapanash (Eneeshur) including Skinpah	2,200	1780			James Mooney
196	SE Woodlands	Old Southwest	Yazoo	2,000+	1700			Dumont de Montigny
197	Subarctic & Arctic	British Columbia, Canada	Nahani and Tahltan in British Columbia	2,000	1780			James Mooney
198	NE Woodlands	New England	Nauset	2,000	1600	24		W. M. Denevan & J. R. Swanton
199	NE Woodlands	Middle Colonies	Wenro	2,000	1600			J. N. B. Hewitt
200	Subarctic & Arctic	District of Mackenzie, Canada	Awokanak (Slavey, Etchaottine)	2,000	1857			Emile Petitot
201	Southwest	Mexican Cession	Hualapai (Walapai)	2,000	1869			J. Ross Browne
202	Northwest Plateau	Oregon Country	Cayuse	2,000	1835			Samuel Parker
203	Northwest Plateau	British Columbia, Canada	Sinixt (Senijextee)	2,000+	1780	20+		James Teit
204	Northwest Coast	British Columbia, Canada	Nuxalk (Bellacoola)	2,000	1835			Wilson Duff
205	Northwest Coast	British Columbia, Canada	Quatsino	2,000	1839			HBC Indian Census 1839
206	Great Plains	Saskatchewan, Canada	Fall Indians (Alannar)	2,000	1804			Extinct Native American tribes of North America
207	Northwest Coast	Oregon Country	Samish	2,000+	1845			Edmund Clare Fitzhugh
208	Subarctic & Arctic	District of Athabasca, Canada	Etheneldeli	2,000	1875			Émile Petitot
209	Northwest Coast	Oregon Country	Klallam	2,000	1780			James Mooney
210	SE Woodlands	Old Southwest	Chakchiuma	2,000	1702		400 families in 1702	Bienville
211	Northwest Coast	Oregon Country	Coos and Miluk	2,000	1780			James Mooney
212	Southwest	Mexican Cession	Qnigyuma (Jalliquamay)	2,000	1680			James Mooney
213	SE Woodlands	Southern Colonies	Cusabo and Cusso	1,900	1600		(Cusabo 1,300 and Cusso 600)	James Mooney & Carolina – The Native Americans
214	Northwest Coast	Oregon Country	Chimnapum (Chamnapum)	1,860	1805		42 lodges	Lewis and Clark
215	Northwest Plateau	Oregon Country	Wanapum (Wanapam)	1,800	1780			James Mooney
216	Northwest Coast	British Columbia, Canada	Squamish (Squawmish)	1,800	1780			James Mooney
217	Subarctic & Arctic	Nunavik, Quebec, Canada	Nunavik Inuit	1,800	1600			James Mooney
218	SE Woodlands	Old Southwest	Houma	1,750	1699		140 cabins and 350 warriors	Pierre d'Iberville
219	Northwest Coast	Oregon Country	Shahala	1,700	1780			James Mooney
220	Northwest Plateau	Oregon Country	Sanpoil	1,700	1780		45+ houses	Verne F. Ray and George Gibbs
221	Northwest Coast	Oregon Country	Coquille	1,650	1800	33		James Owen Dorsey
222	SE Woodlands	Southern Colonies	Wateree (Guatari)	1,600	1600			James Mooney & Carolina – The Native Americans
223	Northwest Coast	Oregon Country	Tlatskanai	1,600	1780			James Mooney
224	NE Woodlands	New England	Passamaquoddy	1,600	1690		320 warriors	Wendell
225	SE Woodlands	Southern Colonies	Westo and Stono	1,600	1600			James Mooney
226	Subarctic & Arctic	District of Mackenzie, Canada	Dogrib (Tlicho)	1,500	1875			Emile Petitot
227	SE Woodlands	Louisiana Purchase	Attacapa (Atakapa)	1,500	1650			James Mooney
228	Great Plains	Louisiana Purchase	Otoe	1,500	1815		(300 warriors)	William Clark
229	Northwest Plateau	Oregon Country	Wasco	1,500	1838			G. Hines
230	Subarctic & Arctic	Yukon, Canada	Hankutchin	1,500	1851		(three subdivisions x 100 warriors each)	John Richardson
231	NE Woodlands	New England	Podunk	1,500+	1675		(300 warriors fought in King Philip's War)	E. Stiles
232	SE Woodlands	Southern Colonies	Saponi	1,500	1600	2		Carolina – The Native Americans
233	SE Woodlands	Southern Colonies	Waxhaw and Sugeree	1,500	1600	2		James Mooney & Carolina – The Native Americans
234	SE Woodlands	Southern Colonies	Manahoac	1,500	1600			James Mooney
235	Great Basin	Mexican Cession	Washo	1,500	1800			A. L. Kroeber
236	SE Woodlands	Louisiana Purchase	Bayogoula, Mugulasha and Quinipissa	1,500	1650			James Mooney
237	SE Woodlands	Old Southwest	Tohome	1,500	1700		300 warriors	Pierre d'Iberville
238	Northwest Coast	Oregon Country	Siletz, Nestucca, Salmon River tribe	1,500	1780			James Mooney
239	Subarctic & Arctic	District of Mackenzie, Canada	Mauvais Monde (Etquaotinne)	1,500	1871		Also spelled Tsethaottine	Censuses of Canada, 1665 to 1871
240	SE Woodlands	Old Southwest	Taensa	1,500	1700		120 cabins and 300 warriors	Pierre d'Iberville
241	SE Woodlands	Spanish Florida	Chatot	1,500	1674			J. R. Swanton
242	Northwest Plateau	Oregon Country	Wishram	1,500	1780			James Mooney
243	Northwest Coast	Oregon Country	Lummi	1,300	1862			Myron Eells
244	Subarctic & Arctic	Alberta, Canada	Beaver (Tsattine)	1,250	1670		Also known as Dane-zaa	James Mooney
245	Subarctic & Arctic	District of Keewatin, Canada	Caribou-Eaters	1,250	1670			James Mooney
246	SE Woodlands	Southern Colonies	Monacan	1,200	1600			James Mooney
247	SE Woodlands	Southern Colonies	Tutelo	1,200	1600			Carolina – The Native Americans
248	SE Woodlands	Southern Colonies	Occaneechi	1,200	1600			James Mooney
249	SE Woodlands	Southern Colonies	Cheraw	1,200	1600			James Mooney
250	SE Woodlands	Southern Colonies	Machapunga	1,200	1600	3		Carolina – The Native Americans
251	Northwest Coast	Oregon Country	Quinaielt	1,200	1805		70 houses	Lewis and Clark
252	SE Woodlands	Texas Annexation	Arkokisa (Akokisa)	1,200	1746	5	300 families in 5 rancherias	H. E. Bolton
253	Northwest Coast	Oregon Country	Kuitsh	1,200	1820	21		Jedidiah Morse and James Owen Dorsey
254	SE Woodlands	Southern Colonies	Secotan	1,200	1600			Maurice A. Mook
255	Subarctic & Arctic	Yukon, Canada	Tutchone	1,100	1910			Frederick Webb Hodge
256	SE Woodlands	Southern Colonies	Waccamaw	1,050	1715	6	210 warriors	W. J. Rivers
257	SE Woodlands	Spanish Florida	Guarugunve & Cuchiyaga	1,040	1570		(they inhabited Florida Keys)	Lopez de Velasco
258	Subarctic & Arctic	District of Mackenzie, Canada	Hare (Kawchottine)	1,000+	1850			Ludwik Krzywicki
259	SE Woodlands	Southern Colonies	Pamlico (Pomouik) and Bear River	1,000	1600			James Mooney & Carolina – The Native Americans
260	SE Woodlands	Southern Colonies	Neusiok & Coree	1,000	1600	5		James Mooney
261	SE Woodlands	Southern Colonies	Cape Fear Indians	1,000	1600			James Mooney
262	SE Woodlands	Southern Colonies	Santee	1,000	1600	2+		James Mooney & Carolina – The Native Americans
263	Great Plains	Texas Annexation	Bidai	1,000+	1745	7	(200+ warriors)	Athanase de Mezieres
264	SE Woodlands	Spanish Florida	Ais & Tekesta	1,000	1650	6+		J. R. Swanton & James Mooney
265	SE Woodlands	Spanish Florida	Jeaga & Mayaimi	1,000	1650	5+		J. R. Swanton & James Mooney
266	SE Woodlands	Spanish Florida	Tocobaga	1,000	1650			James Mooney
267	SE Woodlands	Spanish Florida	Yustaga	1,000	1650			James Mooney
268	SE Woodlands	Old Southwest	Biloxi/Pascagoula/Moctobi	1,000	1650	4		James Mooney
269	SE Woodlands	Southern Colonies	Moratoc	1,000	1600			Carolina – The Native Americans
270	SE Woodlands	Southern Colonies	Edisto	1,000	1600			James Mooney & Carolina – The Native Americans
271	Northwest Coast	British Columbia, Canada	Sechelt	1,000	1780			James Mooney
272	Northwest Plateau	Oregon Country	Wahowpum	1,000	1844			Crawford in G. Wilkes
273	SE Woodlands	Texas Annexation	Yojuane, Deadose	1,000	1745			H. E. Bolton
274	SE Woodlands	Texas Annexation	Mayeye	1,000	1805		200 warriors	J. Sibley
275	SE Woodlands	Old Southwest	Dulchioni	1,000	1712		200 warriors	Andre Penicaut
276	Southwest	Mexican Cession	Manso	1,000	1668			Agustín de Vetancurt
277	Northwest Coast	Oregon Country	Quinault	1,000	1805		Includes 200 Calasthocle	Lewis and Clark
278	SE Woodlands	Louisiana Purchase	Okelousa	950	1650		Not to be confused with Opelousa	James Mooney
279	Northwest Coast	Oregon Country	Cushook	900	1780			James Mooney
280	SE Woodlands	Texas Annexation	Aranama	870+	1778			Athanase de Mezieres
281	SE Woodlands	Southern Colonies	Sewee	800+	1600			James Mooney & Carolina – The Native Americans
282	SE Woodlands	Southern Colonies	Congaree	800	1600			James Mooney
283	SE Woodlands	Southern Colonies	Sissipahaw	800	1600	1		James Mooney & Carolina – The Native Americans
284	NE Woodlands	New England	Paugussett	800	1600			C. Thomas in F. W. Hodge
285	Northwest Plateau	Oregon Country	Smacksop	800	1805		24 houses	Lewis and Clark
286	Subarctic & Arctic	Yukon, Canada	Nahani of Yukon	800	1670			James Mooney
287	Northwest Plateau	Oregon Country	Methow	800	1780			Robert H. Ruby and J. Mooney
288	Northwest Coast	Oregon Country	Snoqualmie	750	1862			Indian Affairs 1862
289	SE Woodlands	Old Southwest	Coushatta (Koasati)	750	1760			John R. Swanton
290	SE Woodlands	Old Southwest	Kaskinampo	750	1700		150 warriors	Bienville
291	SE Woodlands	Southern Colonies	Meherrin	700	1600			James Mooney
292	Subarctic & Arctic	Ontario, Canada	Abittibi	700	1736		(140 warriors)	Michel de La Chauvignerie
293	Northwest Coast	Oregon Country	Quileute	650	1868			W. B. Gosnell
294	Northwest Coast	Oregon Country	Skaquamish	650	1862			Indian Affairs 1862
295	SE Woodlands	Louisiana Purchase	Appalousa (Opelousa)	650	1715		130 warriors, 52 cabins	Baudry de Lozieres
296	Subarctic & Arctic	Northwest Territories, Canada	Yellowknives	600+	1877		70+ tents	Emile Petitot
297	SE Woodlands	Southern Colonies	Etiwaw (also Etiwan)	600	1600			James Mooney & Carolina – The Native Americans
298	SE Woodlands	Southern Colonies	Woccon	600	1701	2	(120 warriors)	John Lawson, "History of Carolina"
299	SE Woodlands	Southern Colonies	Peedee (Pedee)	600	1600	1		James Mooney & Carolina – The Native Americans
300	SE Woodlands	Southern Colonies	Keyauwee	600	1600			James Mooney & Carolina – The Native Americans
301	Southwest	Mexican Cession	Sobaipuri	600	1680			James Mooney
302	NE Woodlands	New England	Quinnipiac	550	1730			John William De Forest
303	SE Woodlands	Old Southwest	Apalachicola	525	1738	2	(105 warriors in two towns)	John R. Swanton
304	NE Woodlands	New England	Manisses	500	1500			Capers Jones
305	Northwest Plateau	Oregon Country	Takelma and Latgawa	500	1780			James Mooney
306	NE Woodlands	New England	Tunxis	500	1600		(100 warriors)	John William De Forest
307	SE Woodlands	Southern Colonies	Chiaha in South Carolina	500	1600			Carolina – The Native Americans
308	SE Woodlands	Southern Colonies	Hatteras	500	1600			Carolina – The Native Americans
309	SE Woodlands	Southern Colonies	Eno	500	1600	1		James Mooney & Carolina – The Native Americans
310	SE Woodlands	Southern Colonies	Shakori	500	1600			James Mooney & Carolina – The Native Americans
311	SE Woodlands	Southern Colonies	Adshusheer	500	1600			James Mooney & Carolina – The Native Americans
312	Northwest Coast	Oregon Country	Twana	500	1841			Myron Eells
313	Northwest Coast	Oregon Country	Chetco	500	1800	9	42 houses in 9 villages	James Owen Dorsey and Ludwik Krzywicki
314	SE Woodlands	Louisiana Purchase	Cahinnio	500+	1687	1	100 cabins in one village	Ludwik Krzywicki
315	Northwest Coast	Oregon Country	Shasta Costa	500+	1750	33	33 small hamlets	James Owen Dorsey and Ludwik Krzywicki
316	SE Woodlands	Southern Colonies	Patuxent	500	1600		100 warriors	William Strachey and John Smith
317	SE Woodlands	Southern Colonies	Mattapanient	500	1600		100 warriors	William Strachey and John Smith
318	NE Woodlands	Quebec, Canada	Atikamekw (Attikamegue)	500+	1647		over 30 canoes	Ludwik Krzywicki
319	SE Woodlands	Southern Colonies	Wicocomoco	500	1600		100 warriors	John Smith
320	Northwest Plateau	British Columbia, Canada	Tsetsaut (Tsesaut)	500	1835			Ludwik Krzywicki and John R. Swanton
321	SE Woodlands	Southern Colonies	Tocwogh	500	1600		100 warriors	John Smith
322	Great Plains	Louisiana Purchase	Sutaio	500	1829		100 warriors	Peter Buell Porter
323	Northwest Coast	British Columbia, Canada	Musqueam	500	1780			Ludwik Krzywicki
324	SE Woodlands	Southern Colonies	Moyawance	500	1600		100 warriors	John Smith
325	Northwest Coast	Oregon Country	Quaitso	500	1830			Hall J. Kelley
326	Subarctic & Arctic	British Columbia, Canada	Strongbow	500	1780			James Mooney
327	SE Woodlands	Louisiana Purchase	Adai	500	1718		100 warriors	Bienville
328	Northwest Coast	Oregon Country	Topinish	450	1839			HBC Indian Census 1839
329	Northwest Coast	Oregon Country	Nooksak	450	1854			Isaac Ingalls Stevens
330	Northwest Coast	Oregon Country	Kathlamet (Cathlamet)	450	1780			James Mooney
331	Subarctic & Arctic	British Columbia, Canada	Ettchaottine	435	1858			F. W. Hodge
332	Northwest Plateau	Oregon Country	Skaddal	400	1847			W. Robertson
333	Northwest Coast	Oregon Country	Luckton	400	1830			Hall J. Kelley
334	NE Woodlands	New England	Wangunk	400	1600			James Mooney
335	SE Woodlands	Louisiana Purchase	Avoyel	400	1698		32 cabins (and 80 warriors)	J. R. Swanton
336	Northwest Coast	Oregon Country	Chimakum	400	1780			James Mooney
337	Northwest Coast	Oregon Country	Squaxon	375	1857			John Ross Browne
338	Northwest Coast	British Columbia, Canada	Kwantlen	375+	1839			HBC Indian Census 1839
339	Great Basin	Mexican Cession	Chemehuevi	355	1910			1910 Census
340	SE Woodlands	Louisiana Purchase	Ouachita	350	1700	1	70 warriors	Bienville
341	Northwest Coast	British Columbia, Canada	Pilalt (Cheam)	304	1839			HBC Indian Census 1839
342	Northwest Coast	British Columbia, Canada	Saukaulutucks	300	1860			R. Mayne
343	Northwest Coast	Oregon Country	Chehalis and Kwaiailk	300	1850			Joseph Lane
344	Great Plains	Louisiana Purchase	Amahami	300	1811			H. M. Brackenridge
345	Subarctic & Arctic	Nunavut, Canada	Southampton Island Inuit	300	1670			James Mooney
346	Northwest Coast	Oregon Country	Clatsop	300	1806			Lewis and Clark
347	Northwest Coast	Oregon Country	Charcowah	300	1780			James Mooney
348	Subarctic & Arctic	District of Mackenzie, Canada	Sheep (Esbataottine)	300	1670			James Mooney
349	Northwest Coast	British Columbia, Canada	Semiahmoo	300	1843			John R. Swanton
350	SE Woodlands	Old Southwest	Tawasa	300	1792			John R. Swanton
351	SE Woodlands	Spanish Florida	Amacano, Chine, Caparaz	300	1674			John R. Swanton
352	NE Woodlands	Middle Colonies	Ozinies	255	1608		They lived in Delaware and Maryland	Maryland at a glance: Native Americans
353	Northwest Plateau	Oregon Country	Umatilla	250	1858			Indian Affairs 1858
354	SE Woodlands	Louisiana Purchase	Washa	250	1715		50 warriors	Baudry de Lozieres
355	Subarctic & Arctic	District of Mackenzie, Canada	Nahani in District of Mackenzie	250	1906			John R. Swanton
356	SE Woodlands	Old Southwest	Naniaba	250	1730		50 warriors	Regis de Rouillet
357	Northwest Plateau	Oregon Country	Squannaroo	240	1847			W. Robertson
358	Northwest Plateau	Oregon Country	Molala	240	1857			J. W. P. Huntington
359	SE Woodlands	Louisiana Purchase	Nacisi	230	1700		23 houses	Bienville
360	SE Woodlands	Southern Colonies	Secowocomoco	200	1600		40 warriors	John Smith
361	Northwest Coast	Oregon Country	Copalis	200	1805		10 houses	Lewis and Clark
362	NE Woodlands	Louisiana Purchase	Ahwajiaway	200	1805			Extinct Native American tribes of North America
363	Northwest Coast	Oregon Country	Kwalhioqua	200	1780			James Mooney
364	SE Woodlands	Southern Colonies	Juntata	200	1648		40 warriors	R. Evelin
365	SE Woodlands	Louisiana Purchase	Chawasha	200	1715		40 warriors	Baudry de Lozieres
366	SE Woodlands	Southern Colonies	Winyaw	180	1715	1	(36 warriors and one village)	Carolina – The Native Americans
367	Northwest Coast	British Columbia, Canada	Nanoose	159	1839			HBC Indian Census 1839
368	NE Woodlands	Ontario, Canada	Totontaratonhronon	150	1640		15 houses	J. Lalemant
369	Northwest Plateau	British Columbia, Canada	Nicola Athapaskans (Stuichamukh)	150	1780	3	Also spelled Stuwihamuq	Franz Boas & J. Mooney
370	Northwest Coast	British Columbia, Canada	Sumas	132	1895	3		Canadian Indian Affairs
371	Northwest Plateau	Oregon Country	Wiam	130	1850			Joseph Lane
372	SE Woodlands	Texas Annexation	Cujane	100	1750			H. E. Bolton
373	Northwest Coast	Oregon Country	Hoh	100	1875			Indian Affairs 1875
374	NE Woodlands	Old Northwest	Noquet	100	1721			N. Y. Col. Dcts., VI. 622
375	SE Woodlands	Spanish Florida	Pensacola	100	1725		20 warriors	Bienville
376	SE Woodlands	Old Southwest	Choula	40	1722			Benard de La Harpe
377	California	Mexican Cession	California Native tribes	340,000	1769			Cook, Jones & Codding, Field
378	Subarctic & Arctic	Alaska	Alaska Native tribes	93,800	1750			Steve Langdon

The total peak population size only for the tribes listed in this table is 3,529,240 in the US and Canada (including 507,675 in Canada). This number is very similar to Snow's estimate for the US and Canada and to Alchon's, Denevan's and Milner's estimates.

== Pre-Columbian Americas ==
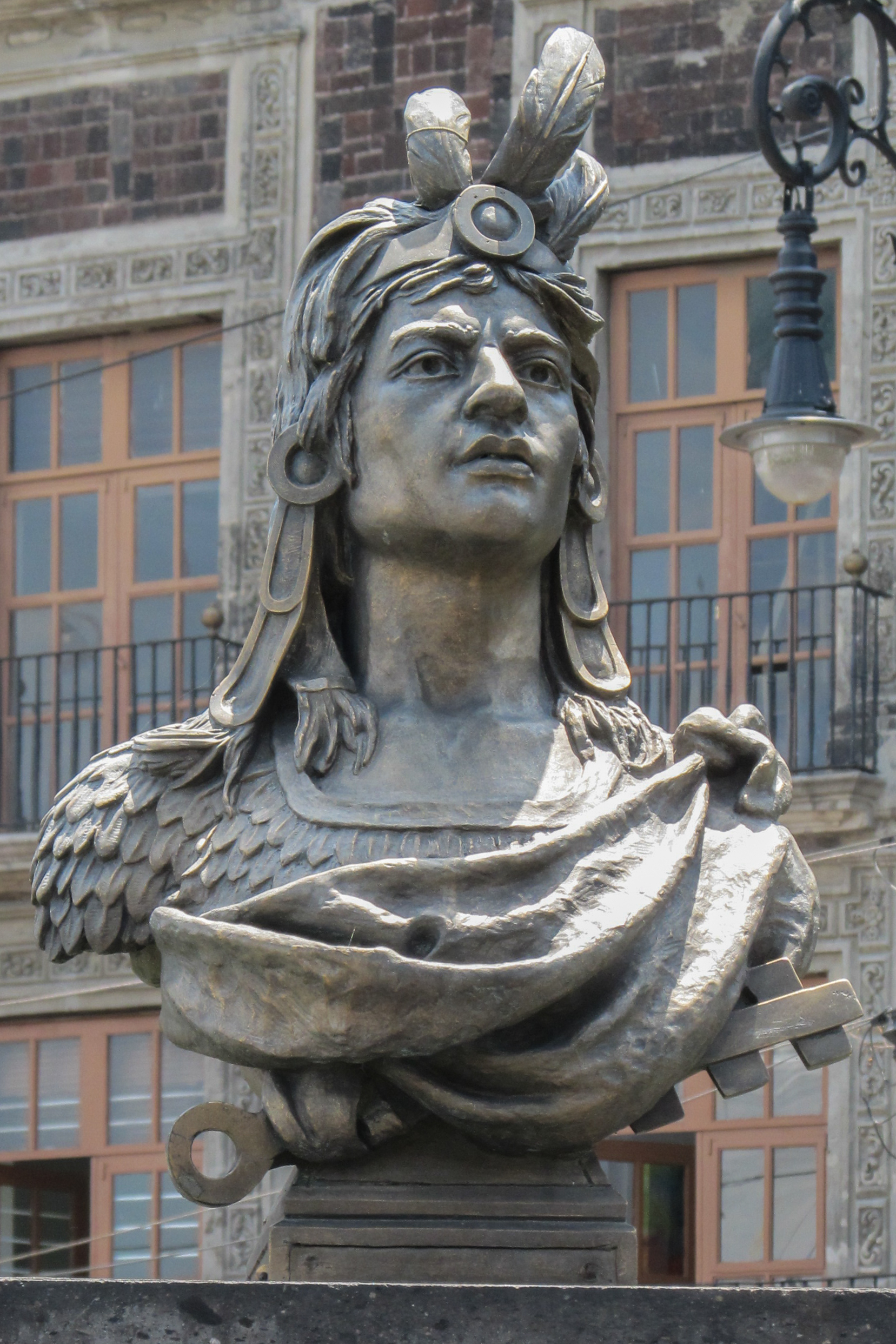
Bust of Cuauhtémoc in el Zócalo, Mexico City

Genetic diversity and population structure in the American land mass using DNA micro-satellite markers (genotype) sampled from North, Central, and South America have been analyzed against similar data available from other Indigenous populations worldwide. The Amerindian populations show a lower genetic diversity than populations from other continental regions. Decreasing genetic diversity with increasing geographic distance from the Bering Strait can be seen, as well as a decreasing genetic similarity to Siberian populations from Alaska (genetic entry point). A higher level of diversity and lower level of population structure in western South America compared to eastern South America is observed. A relative lack of differentiation between Mesoamerican and Andean populations is a scenario that implies coastal routes were easier than inland routes for migrating peoples (Paleo-Indians) to traverse. The overall pattern that is emerging suggests that the Americas were recently colonized by a small number of individuals (effective size of about 70–250), and then they grew by a factor of 10 over 800–1,000 years. The data also show that there have been genetic exchanges between Asia, the Arctic and Greenland since the initial peopling of the Americas. A new study in early 2018 suggests that the effective population size of the original founding population of Native Americans was about 250 people.

== Depopulation by Old World diseases ==
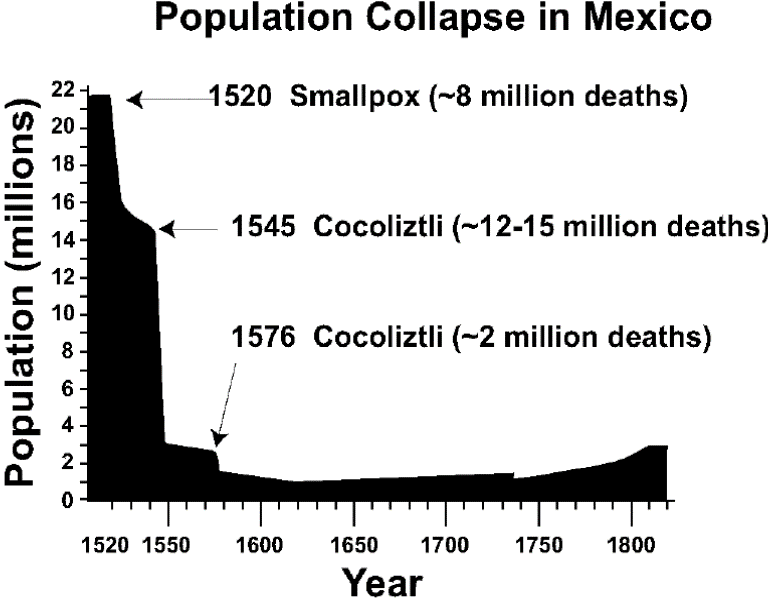
One estimate of population collapse in Central Mexico brought on by successive epidemics in the early colonial period. Note: Other scholars' estimates vary widely.

Early explanations for the population decline of the Indigenous peoples of the Americas include the brutal practices of the Spanish conquistadores, as recorded by the Spaniards themselves, such as the encomienda system, which was ostensibly set up to protect people from warring tribes as well as to teach them the Spanish language and the Catholic religion, but in practice was tantamount to serfdom and slavery. The most notable account was that of the Dominican friar Bartolomé de las Casas, whose writings vividly depict Spanish atrocities committed in particular against the Taínos. The second European explanation was a perceived divine approval, in which God removed the Indigenous peoples as part of His "divine plan" to make way for a new Christian civilization. Many Native Americans viewed their troubles in a religious framework within their own belief systems.

According to later academics such as Noble David Cook, a community of scholars began "quietly accumulating piece by piece data on early epidemics in the Americas and their relation to the subjugation of native peoples." Scholars like Cook believe that widespread epidemic disease, to which the Indigenous peoples had no prior exposure or resistance, was the primary cause of the massive population decline of the Native Americans. One of the most devastating diseases was smallpox, but other deadly diseases included typhus, measles, influenza, bubonic plague, cholera, malaria, tuberculosis, mumps, yellow fever, and pertussis, which were chronic in Eurasia.

However, recently scholars have studied the link between physical colonial violence such as warfare, displacement, and enslavement, and the proliferation of disease among Native populations. For example, according to Coquille scholar Dina Gilio-Whitaker, "In recent decades, however, researchers challenge the idea that disease is solely responsible for the rapid Indigenous population decline. The research identifies other aspects of European contact that had profoundly negative impacts on Native peoples' ability to survive foreign invasion: war, massacres, enslavement, overwork, deportation, the loss of will to live or reproduce, malnutrition and starvation from the breakdown of trade networks, and the loss of subsistence food production due to land loss."

Further, Andrés Reséndez of the University of California, Davis points out that, even though the Spanish were aware of deadly diseases such as smallpox, there is no mention of them in the New World until 1519, implying that, until that date, epidemic disease played no significant part in the depopulation of the Antilles. The practices of forced labor, brutal punishment, and inadequate necessities of life, were the initial and major reasons for depopulation. Jason Hickel estimates that a third of Arawak workers died every six months from forced labor in these mines. In this way, "slavery has emerged as a major killer" of the Indigenous populations of the Caribbean between 1492 and 1550, as it set the conditions for diseases such as smallpox, influenza, and malaria to flourish. Unlike the populations of Europe who rebounded following the Black Death, no such rebound occurred for the Indigenous populations.

Similarly, historian Jeffrey Ostler at the University of Oregon has argued that population collapses in North America throughout colonization were not due mainly to lack of Native immunity to European disease. Instead, he claims that "When severe epidemics did hit, it was often less because Native bodies lacked immunity than because European colonialism disrupted Native communities and damaged their resources, making them more vulnerable to pathogens." In specific regard to Spanish colonization of northern Florida and southeastern Georgia, Native peoples there "were subject to forced labor and, because of poor living conditions and malnutrition, succumbed to wave after wave of unidentifiable diseases." Further, in relation to British colonization in the Northeast, Algonquian speaking tribes in Virginia and Maryland "suffered from a variety of diseases, including malaria, typhus, and possibly smallpox." These diseases were not solely a case of Native susceptibility, however, because "as colonists took their resources, Native communities were subject to malnutrition, starvation, and social stress, all making people more vulnerable to pathogens. Repeated epidemics created additional trauma and population loss, which in turn disrupted the provision of healthcare." Such conditions would continue, alongside rampant disease in Native communities, throughout colonization, the formation of the United States, and multiple forced removals, as Ostler explains that many scholars "have yet to come to grips with how U.S. expansion created conditions that made Native communities acutely vulnerable to pathogens and how severely disease impacted them. ... Historians continue to ignore the catastrophic impact of disease and its relationship to U.S. policy and action even when it is right before their eyes."

Historian David Stannard says that by "focusing almost entirely on disease ... contemporary authors increasingly have created the impression that the eradication of those tens of millions of people was inadvertent—a sad, but both inevitable and "unintended consequence" of human migration and progress," and asserts that their destruction "was neither inadvertent nor inevitable," but the result of microbial pestilence and purposeful genocide working in tandem. He also wrote:

...Despite frequent undocumented assertions that disease was responsible for the great majority of indigenous deaths in the Americas, there does not exist a single scholarly work that even pretends to demonstrate this claim on the basis of solid evidence. And that is because there is no such evidence, anywhere. The supposed truism that more native people died from disease than from direct face-to-face killing or from gross mistreatment or other concomitant derivatives of that brutality such as starvation, exposure, exhaustion, or despair is nothing more than a scholarly article of faith...

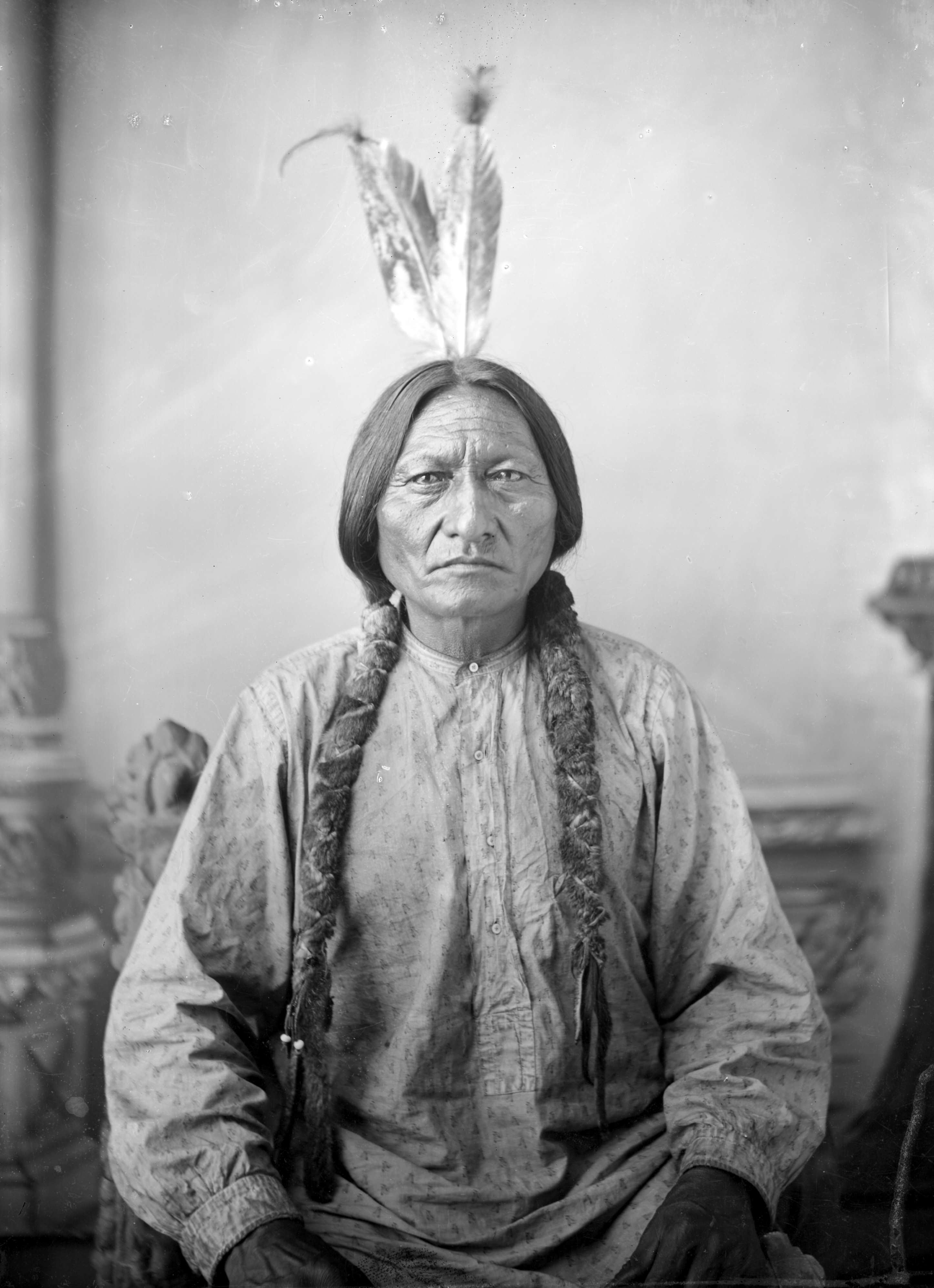
Chief Sitting Bull

In contrast, historian Russel Thornton has pointed out that there were disastrous epidemics and population losses during the first half of the sixteenth century "resulting from incidental contact, or even without direct contact, as disease spread from one American Indian tribe to another." Thornton has also challenged higher Indigenous population estimates, which are based on the Malthusian assumption that "populations tend to increase to, and beyond, the limits of the food available to them at any particular level of technology."

The European colonization of the Americas resulted in the deaths of so many people it contributed to climatic change and temporary global cooling, according to scientists from University College London. A century after the arrival of Christopher Columbus, some 90% of Indigenous Americans had perished from "wave after wave of disease", along with mass slavery and war, in what researchers have described as the "great dying". According to one of the researchers, UCL Geography Professor Mark Maslin, the large death toll also boosted the economies of Europe: "the depopulation of the Americas may have inadvertently allowed the Europeans to dominate the world. It also allowed for the Industrial Revolution and for Europeans to continue that domination."

=== Biological warfare ===
When Old World diseases were first carried to the Americas at the end of the fifteenth century, they spread throughout the southern and northern hemispheres, leaving the Indigenous populations in near ruins. No evidence has been discovered that the earliest Spanish colonists and missionaries deliberately attempted to infect the American Natives, and some efforts were made to limit the devastating effects of disease before it killed off what remained of their labor force (compelled to work under the encomienda system). The cattle introduced by the Spanish contaminated various water reserves which Native Americans dug in the fields to accumulate rainwater. In response, the Franciscans and Dominicans created public fountains and aqueducts to guarantee access to drinking water. But when the Franciscans lost their privileges in 1572, many of these fountains were no longer guarded and so deliberate well poisoning may have happened. Although no proof of such poisoning has been found, some historians believe the decrease of the population correlates with the end of religious orders' control of the water.

In following centuries, accusations and discussions of biological warfare were common. Well-documented accounts of incidents involving both threats and acts of deliberate infection are very rare, but may have occurred more frequently than scholars have previously acknowledged. Many of the instances likely went unreported, and it is possible that documents relating to such acts were deliberately destroyed, or sanitized. By the middle of the 18th century, colonists had the knowledge and technology to attempt biological warfare with the smallpox virus. They well understood the concept of quarantine, and that contact with the sick could infect the healthy with smallpox, and those who survived the illness would not be infected again. Whether the threats were carried out, or how effective individual attempts were, is uncertain.

One such threat was delivered by fur trader James McDougall, who is quoted as saying to a gathering of local chiefs, "You know the smallpox. Listen: I am the smallpox chief. In this bottle I have it confined. All I have to do is to pull the cork, send it forth among you, and you are dead men. But this is for my enemies and not my friends." Likewise, another fur trader threatened Pawnee Indians that if they didn't agree to certain conditions, "he would let the smallpox out of a bottle and destroy them." The Reverend Isaac McCoy was quoted in his History of Baptist Indian Missions as saying that the white men had deliberately spread smallpox among the Indians of the southwest, including the Pawnee tribe, and the havoc it made was reported to General Clark and the Secretary of War. Artist and writer George Catlin observed that Native Americans were also suspicious of vaccination, "They see white men urging the operation so earnestly they decide that it must be some new mode or trick of the pale face by which they hope to gain some new advantage over them." So great was the distrust of the settlers that the Mandan chief Four Bears denounced the white man, whom he had previously treated as brothers, for deliberately bringing the disease to his people.

During the siege of British-held Fort Pitt in the Seven Years' War, Colonel Henry Bouquet ordered his men to take smallpox-infested blankets from their hospital and gave them as gifts to two neutral Lenape Indian dignitaries during a peace settlement negotiation, according to the entry in the Captain's ledger, "To convey the Smallpox to the Indians". In the following weeks, Sir Jeffrey Amherst conspired with Bouquet to "Extirpate this Execreble Race" of Native Americans, writing, "Could it not be contrived to send the small pox among the disaffected tribes of Indians? We must on this occasion use every stratagem in our power to reduce them." His Colonel agreed to try.

Most scholars have asserted that the 1837 Great Plains smallpox epidemic was "started among the tribes of the upper Missouri River by failure to quarantine steamboats on the river", and Captain Pratt of the St. Peter "was guilty of contributing to the deaths of thousands of innocent people. The law calls his offense criminal negligence. Yet in light of all the deaths, the almost complete annihilation of the Mandans, and the terrible suffering the region endured, the label criminal negligence is benign, hardly befitting an action that had such horrendous consequences." However, some sources attribute the 1836–40 epidemic to the deliberate communication of smallpox to Native Americans, with historian Ann F. Ramenofsky writing, "Variola Major can be transmitted through contaminated articles such as clothing or blankets. In the nineteenth century, the U. S. Army sent contaminated blankets to Native Americans, especially Plains groups, to control the Indian problem." In Brazil, well into the 20th century, deliberate infection attacks continued as Brazilian settlers and miners transported infections intentionally to the Native groups whose lands they coveted.

=== Vaccination ===
After Edward Jenner's 1796 demonstration that the smallpox vaccination worked, the technique became better known and smallpox became less deadly in the United States and elsewhere. Many colonists and Natives were vaccinated, although, in some cases, officials tried to vaccinate Natives only to discover that the disease was too widespread to stop. At other times, trade demands led to broken quarantines. In other cases, Natives refused vaccination because of suspicion of whites. The first international healthcare expedition in history was the Balmis Expedition which had the aim of vaccinating Indigenous peoples against smallpox all along the Spanish Empire in 1803. In 1831, government officials vaccinated the Yankton Dakota at Sioux Agency. The Santee Sioux refused vaccination and many died.

== Depopulation by European conquest ==
=== War and violence ===
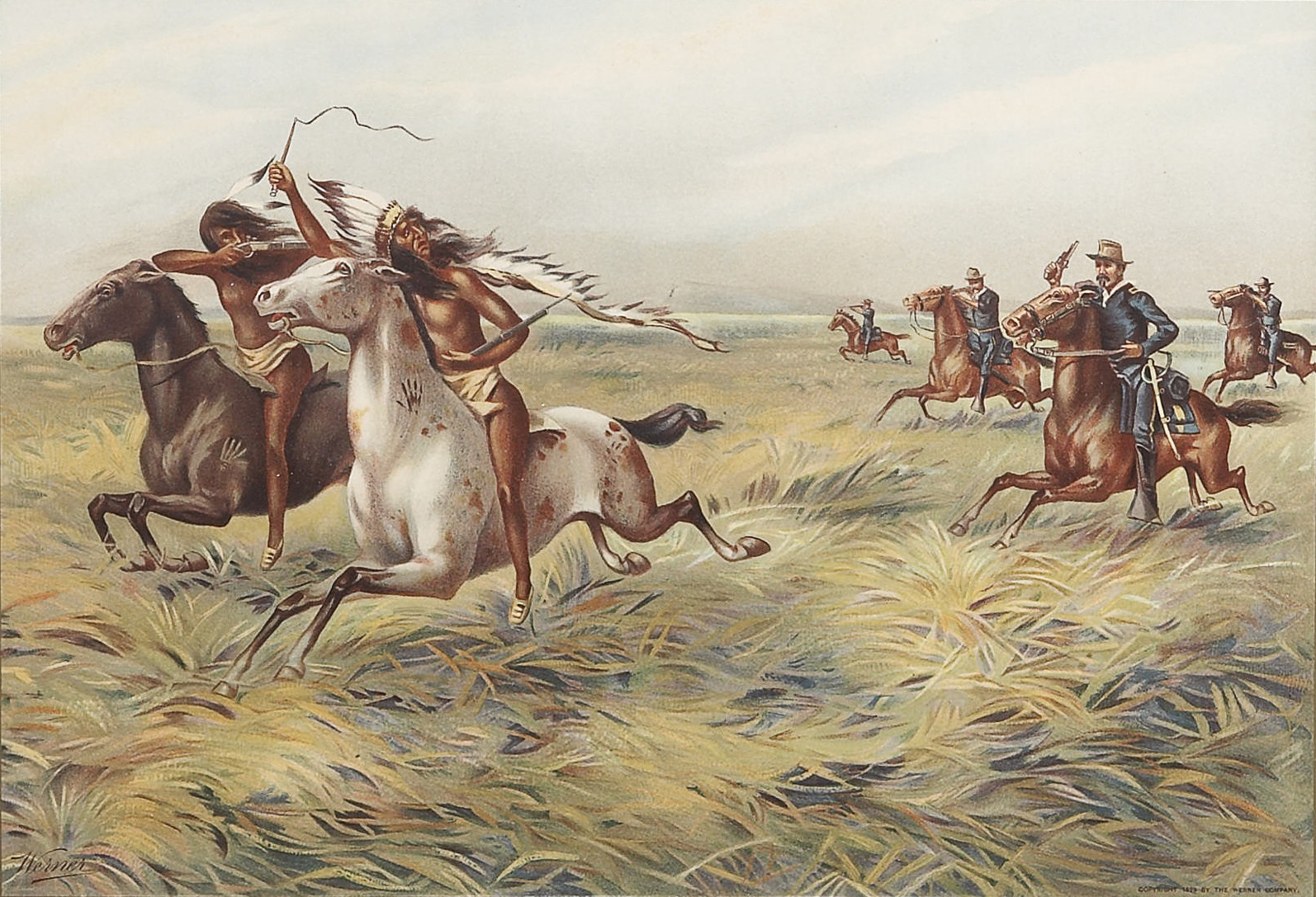
An 1899 chromolithograph of U.S. cavalry pursuing Native Americans, artist unknown

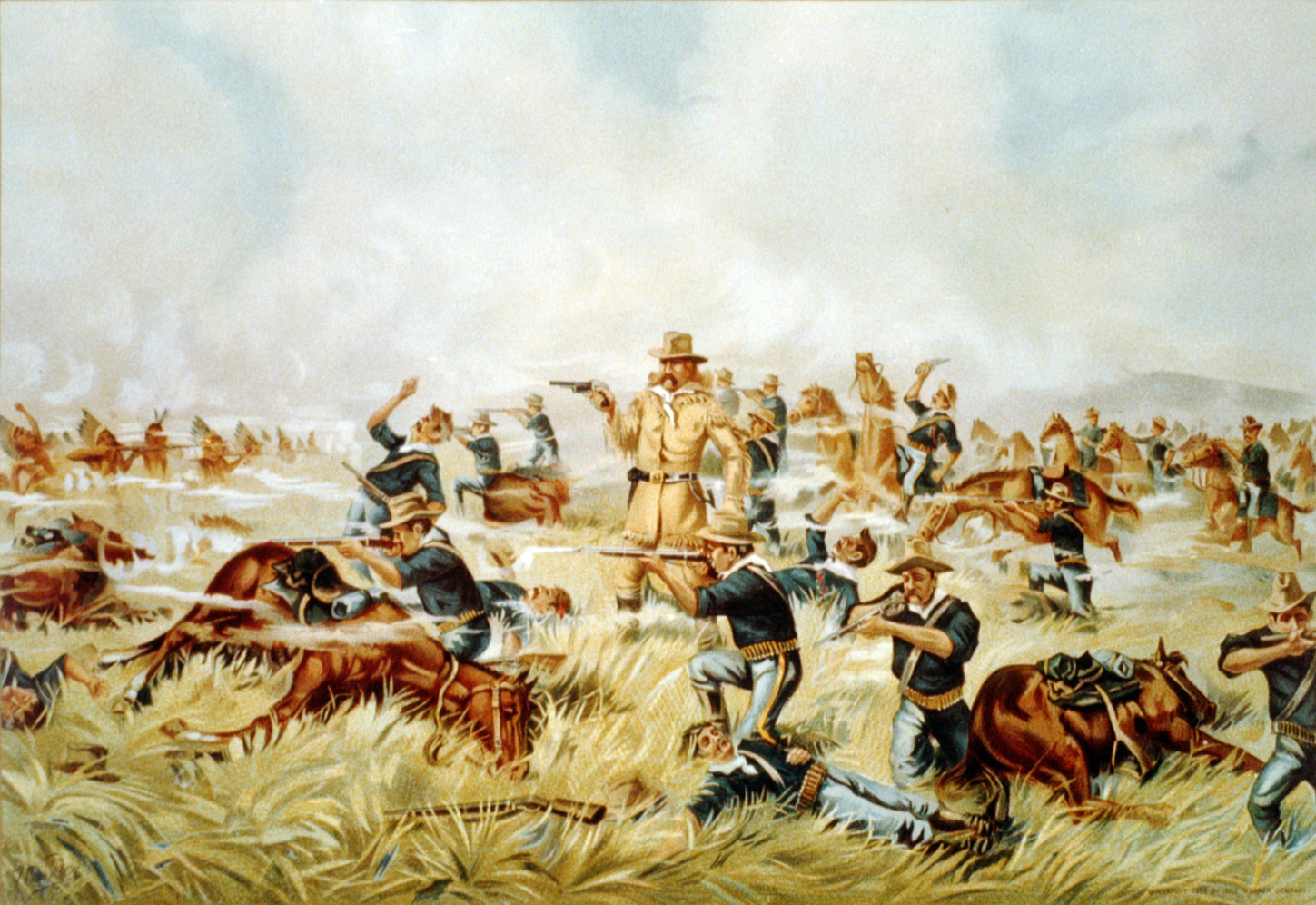
An 1899 chromolithograph from the Werner Company of Akron, Ohio, titled Custer Massacre at Big Horn, Montana – 25 June 1876

While epidemic disease was a leading factor of the population decline of the American Indigenous peoples after 1492, there were other contributing factors, all of them related to European contact and colonization. One of these factors was warfare. According to demographer Russell Thornton, although many people died in wars over the centuries, and war sometimes contributed to the near extinction of certain tribes, warfare and death by other violent means was a comparatively minor cause of overall Native population decline.

From the U.S. Bureau of the Census in 1894, wars between the government and the Indigenous peoples ranged over 40 in number over the previous 100 years. These wars cost the lives of approximately 19,000 white people, and the lives of about 30,000 Indians, including men, women, and children. They safely estimated that the number of Native people who were killed or wounded was actually around fifty percent more than what was recorded.

There is some disagreement among scholars about how widespread warfare was in pre-Columbian America, but there is general agreement that war became deadlier after the arrival of the Europeans and their firearms. The South or Central American infrastructure allowed for thousands of European conquistadors and tens of thousands of their Indian auxiliaries to attack the dominant Indigenous civilization. Empires such as the Incas depended on a highly centralized administration for the distribution of resources. Disruption caused by the war and the colonization hampered the traditional economy, and possibly led to shortages of food and materials. Across the western hemisphere, war with various Native American civilizations constituted alliances based out of both necessity or economic prosperity and, resulted in mass-scale intertribal warfare. European colonization in the North American continent also contributed to a number of wars between Native Americans, who fought over which of them should have first access to new technology and weaponry—like in the Beaver Wars.

=== Genocides ===
According to the Cambridge World History, the Oxford Handbook of Genocide Studies, and the Cambridge World History of Genocide, colonial policies in some cases included the deliberate genocide of indigenous peoples in North America. According to the Cambridge World History of Genocide, Spanish colonization of the Americas also included genocidal massacres.

According to Adam Jones, genocidal methods included the following:

- Genocidal massacres
- Biological warfare, using pathogens (especially smallpox and plague) to which the indigenous peoples had no resistance
- Spreading of disease via the 'reduction' of Indians to densely crowded and unhygienic settlements
- Slavery and forced/indentured labor, especially, though not exclusively, in Latin America, in conditions often rivaling those of Nazi concentration camps
- Mass population removals to barren 'reservations,' sometimes involving death marches en route, and generally leading to widespread mortality and population collapse upon arrival
- Deliberate starvation and famine, exacerbated by destruction and occupation of the native land base and food resources
- Forced education of indigenous children in White-run schools ...

=== Exploitation ===
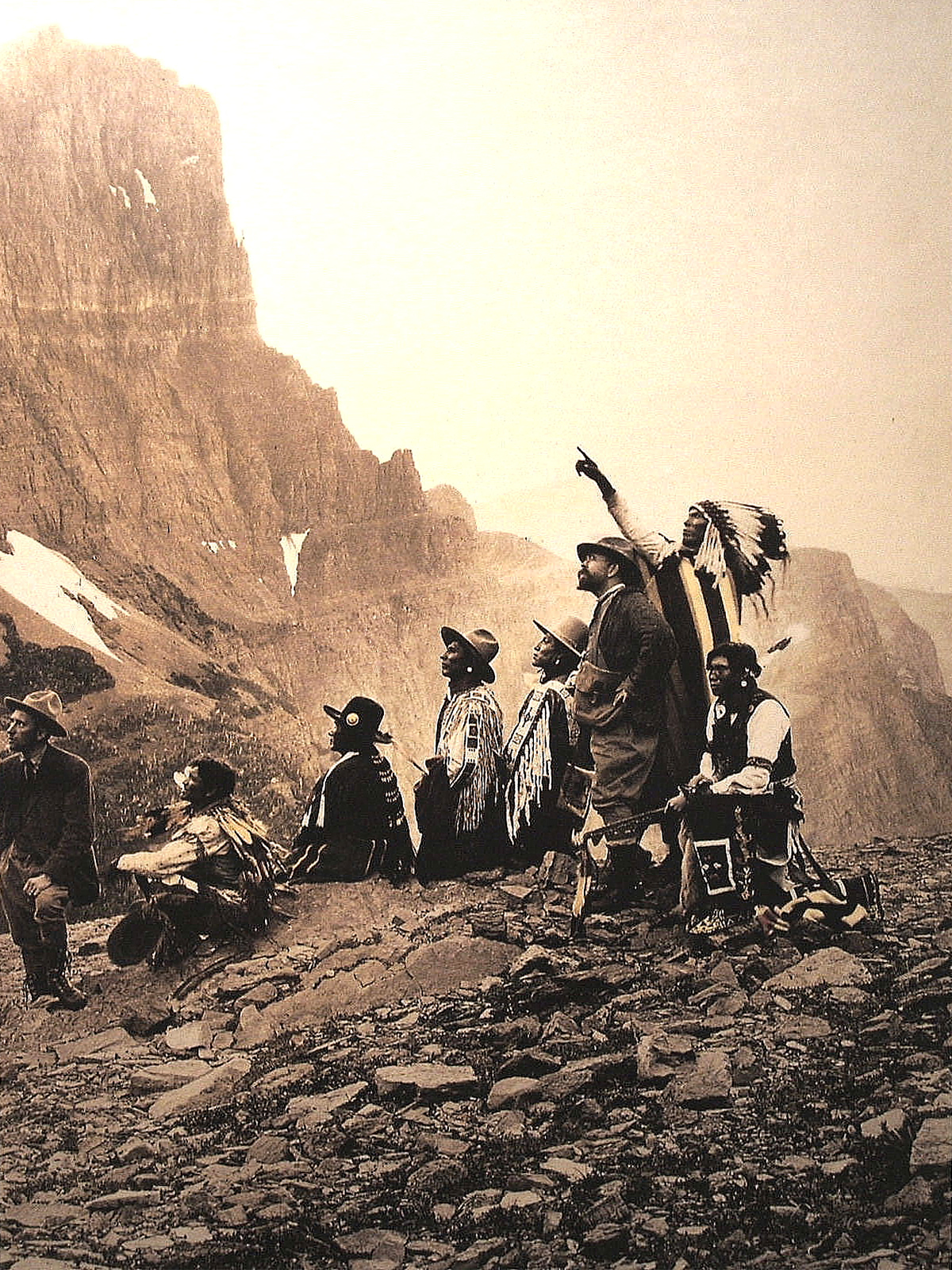
D'Albertis Castle, Genoa, Museum of World Cultures

Some Spaniards objected to the encomienda system of labor, notably Bartolomé de las Casas, who insisted that the Indigenous people were humans with souls and rights. Because of many revolts and military encounters, Emperor Charles V helped relieve the strain on both the Native laborers and the Spanish vanguards probing the Caribana for military and diplomatic purposes. Later on New Laws were promulgated in Spain in 1542 to protect isolated Natives, but the abuses in the Americas were never entirely or permanently abolished. The Spanish also employed the pre-Columbian draft system called the mita, and treated their subjects as something between slaves and serfs. Serfs stayed to work the land; slaves were exported to the mines, where large numbers of them died. In other areas the Spaniards replaced the ruling Aztecs and Incas and divided the conquered lands among themselves ruling as the new feudal lords with often, but unsuccessful lobbying to the viceroys of the Spanish crown to pay Tlaxcalan war indemnities. The infamous Bandeirantes from São Paulo, adventurers mostly of mixed Portuguese and Native ancestry, penetrated steadily westward in their search for Indian slaves. Serfdom existed as such in parts of Latin America well into the 19th century, past independence. Historian Andrés Reséndez argues that even though the Spanish were aware of the spread of smallpox, they made no mention of it until 1519, a quarter century after Columbus arrived in Hispaniola. Instead he contends that enslavement in gold and silver mines was the primary reason why the Native American population of Hispaniola dropped so significantly and that even though disease was a factor, the Native population would have rebounded the same way Europeans did following the Black Death if it were not for the constant enslavement they were subject to. He further contends that enslavement of Native Americans was in fact the primary cause of their depopulation in Spanish territories; that the majority of Indians enslaved were women and children compared to the enslavement of Africans which mostly targeted adult males and in turn they were sold at a 50% to 60% higher price, and that 2,462,000 to 4,985,000 Amerindians were enslaved between Columbus's arrival and 1900.

=== Massacres ===
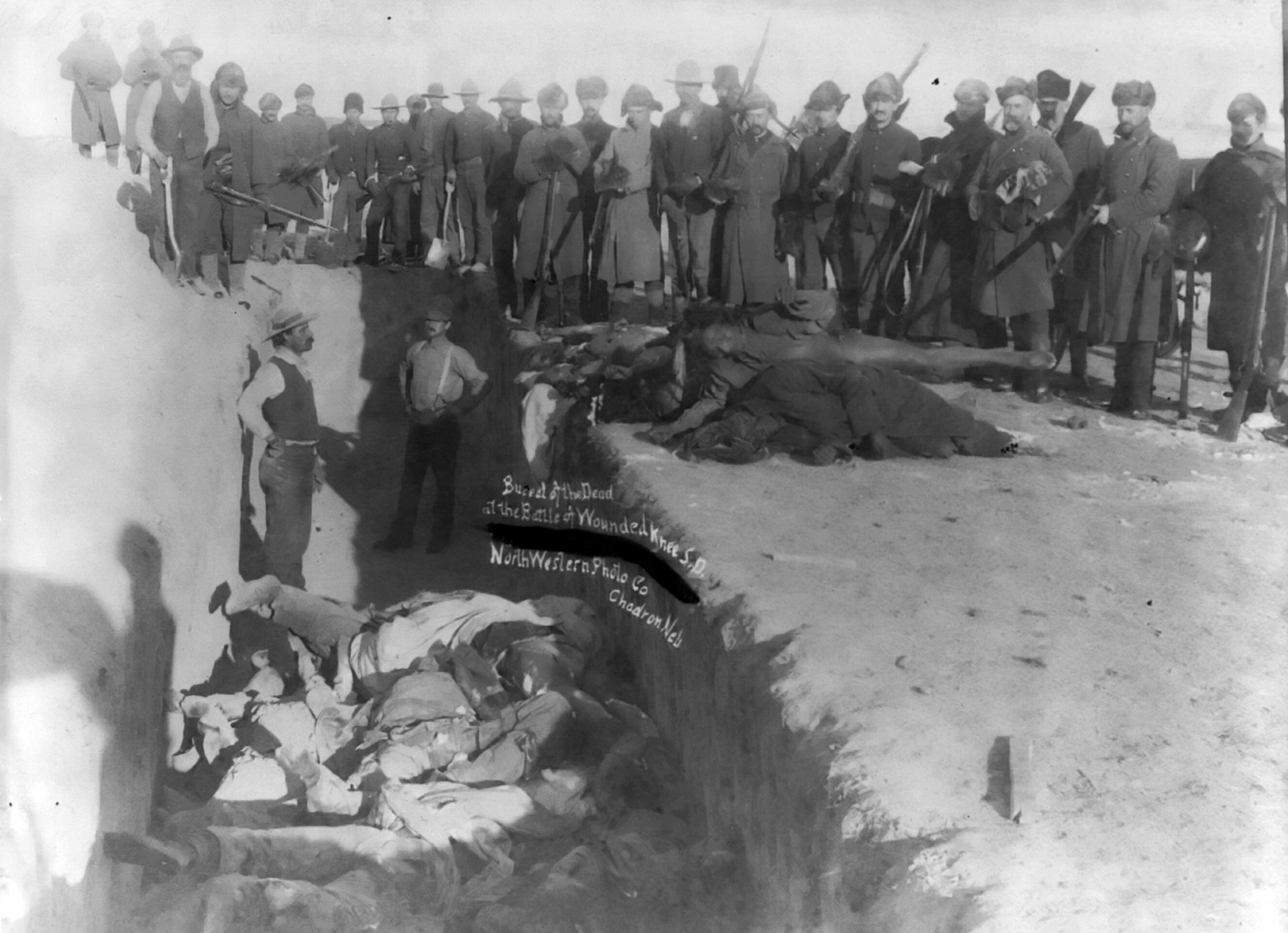
Mass grave of Lakota dead after the 1890 Wounded Knee massacre

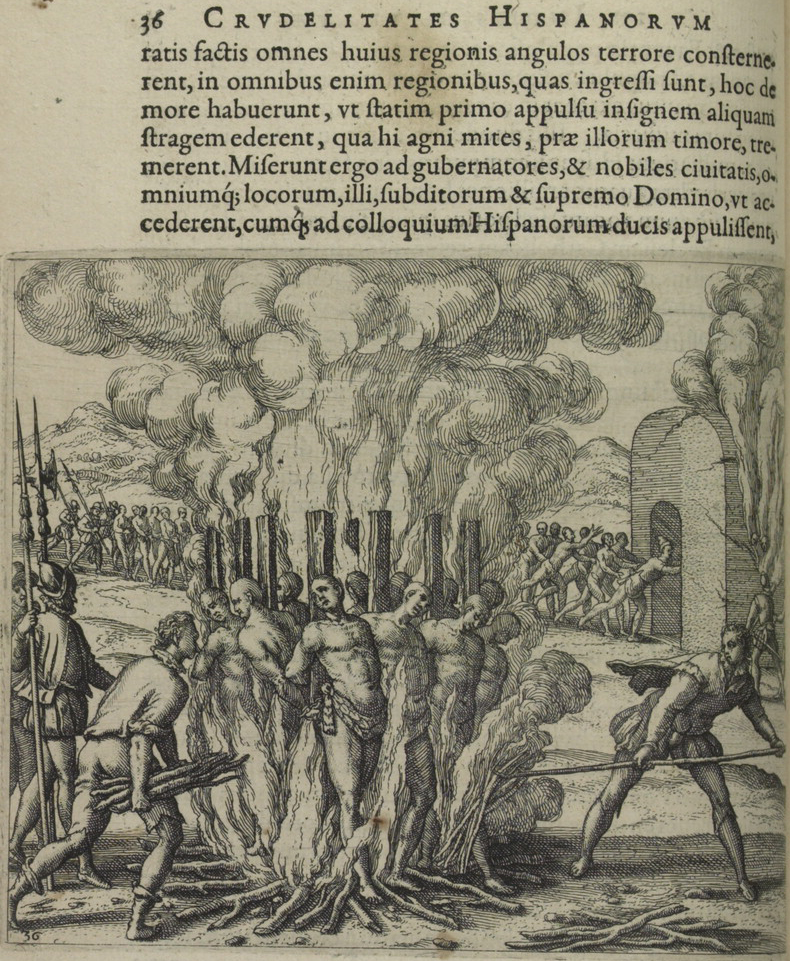
Conquest of Mexico

- The Pequot War in early New England.
- In mid-19th century Argentina, post-independence leaders Juan Manuel de Rosas and Julio Argentino Roca engaged in what they presented as a "Conquest of the Desert" against the Natives of the Argentinian interior, leaving over 1,300 Indigenous dead.
- While some California tribes were settled on reservations, others were hunted down and massacred by 19th century American settlers. It is estimated that at least 9,400 to 16,000 California Indians were killed by non-Indians, mostly occurring in more than 370 massacres (defined as the "intentional killing of five or more disarmed combatants or largely unarmed noncombatants, including women, children, and prisoners, whether in the context of a battle or otherwise").

=== Displacement and disruption ===
Throughout history, Indigenous people have been subjected to the repeated and forced removal from their land. Beginning in the 1830s, there was the relocation of an estimated 100,000 Indigenous people in the United States called the "Trail of Tears". The tribes affected by this specific removal were the Five Civilized Tribes: The Cherokee, Creek, Chickasaw, Choctaw, and Seminole. The treaty of New Echota, was enacted, which stated that the United States "would give Cherokee land west of the Mississippi in exchange for $5,000,000". According to Jeffrey Ostler, "Of the 80,000 Native people who were forced west from 1830 into the 1850s, between 12,000 and 17,000 perished." Ostler states that "the large majority died of interrelated factors of starvation, exposure and disease".

In addition to the removal of the Southern Tribes, there were multiple other removals of Northern Tribes also known as "Trails of Tears." For example, "In the free labor states of the North, federal and state officials, supported by farmers, speculators and business interests, evicted Shawnees, Delawares, Senecas, Potawatomis, Miamis, Wyandots, Ho-Chunks, Ojibwes, Sauks and Meskwakis." These Nations were moved West of the Mississippi into what is now known as Eastern Kansas, and numbered 17,000 on arrival. According to Ostler, "by 1860, their numbers had been cut in half" because of low fertility, high infant mortality, and increased disease caused by conditions such as polluted drinking water, few resources, and social stress.

Ostler also writes that the areas that Northern tribes were removed to were already inhabited: "The areas west of the Mississippi River were home to other Indigenous nations—Osages, Kanzas, Omahas, Ioways, Otoes and Missourias. To make room for thousands of people from the East, the government dispossessed these nations of much their lands." Ostler writes that when Northern Nations were moved onto their landing 1840, "The combined population of these western nations was 9,000 ... 20 years later, it had fallen to 6,000."

=== Later apologies by government officials ===
On 8 September 2000, the head of the United States Bureau of Indian Affairs (BIA) formally apologized for the agency's participation in the ethnic cleansing of Western tribes. In a speech before representatives of Native American peoples in June 2019, California governor Gavin Newsom apologized for the "California Genocide." Newsom said, "That's what it was, a genocide. No other way to describe it. And that's the way it needs to be described in the history books."

== Modern Indigenous population by region according to the censuses ==
Region	Percentage	Total population	Country	Year
Between 75% and 100%
Totonicapán	97.99%	410,195	Guatemala	2018
Ngäbe-Buglé	97.85%	207,540	Panama	2023
Guna Yala	97.83%	31,323	Panama	2023
(Chocó Department) Emberá-Wounaan	97.47%	12,038	Panama	2023
Sololá	96.37%	406,295	Guatemala	2018
Alta Verapaz	92.95%	1,129,369	Guatemala	2018
Puno	90.81%	857,351	Peru	2017
Quiché	89.17%	846,500	Guatemala	2018
Apurímac	86.97%	273,947	Peru	2017
Gracias a Dios	82.70%	75,121	Honduras	2013
Vaupés	81.68%	30,787	Colombia	2018
Ayacucho	81.48%	388,476	Peru	2017
Huancavelica	80.88%	215,812	Peru	2017
Chimaltenango	78.17%	481,335	Guatemala	2018
Cusco	75.91%	721,430	Peru	2017
Between 50% and 75%
Guainía	74.90%	33,280	Colombia	2018
Bocas del Toro	73.08%	116,369	Panama	2023
Potosí	69.50%	572,314	Bolivia	2012
Oaxaca	69.18%	2,858,620	Mexico	2020
Yucatán	65.18%	1,512,761	Mexico	2020
Huehuetenango	64.99%	760,871	Guatemala	2018
Baja Verapaz	60.02%	179,746	Guatemala	2018
Vichada	58.16%	44,578	Colombia	2018
Amazonas	57.72%	38,130	Colombia	2018
La Paz	55.70%	110,854	Honduras	2013
La Paz	54.49%	1,474,654	Bolivia	2012
Intibucá	53.10%	123,440	Honduras	2013
Amazonas	52.10%	76,314	Venezuela	2011
Oruro	51.08%	252,444	Bolivia	2012
Quetzaltenango	50.86%	406,491	Guatemala	2018
Chuquisaca	50.29%	289,728	Bolivia	2012
Between 25% and 50%
La Guajira	47.82%	394,683	Colombia	2018
Cochabamba	47.52%	835,535	Bolivia	2012
Campeche	47.26%	438,744	Mexico	2020
Huanuco	43.34%	239,049	Peru	2017
Boquerón	41.88%	29,774	Paraguay	2022
Tacna	40.32%	108,469	Peru	2017
Sacatepéquez	40.17%	132,762	Guatemala	2018
Pasco	39.87%	78,455	Peru	2017
Madre de Dios	39.47%	41,646	Peru	2017
Suchitepéquez	38.05%	211,103	Guatemala	2018
Darién	37.80%	20,501	Panama	2023
Moquegua	36.71%	52,205	Peru	2017
Chiapas	36.65%	2,031,812	Mexico	2020
Hidalgo	36.60%	1,128,319	Mexico	2020
Junin	36.45%	353,192	Peru	2017
Arica y Parinacota	36.2%	87,816	Chile	2024
Arequipa	34.74%	388,476	Peru	2017
Ancash	34.15%	290,420	Peru	2017
Araucania	34.5%	347,285	Chile	2024
Quintana Roo	33.23%	617,408	Mexico	2020
Puebla	33.22%	2,186,964	Mexico	2020
Guerrero	33.14%	1,173,383	Mexico	2020
Beni	33.14%	134,025	Bolivia	2012
San Marcos	30.81%	318,093	Guatemala	2018
Petén	30.20%	164,814	Guatemala	2018
Izabal	28.21%	115,296	Guatemala	2018
Aysén	29.2%	29,230	Chile	2024
Los Lagos	26.7%	236,886	Chile	2024
Veracruz	26.90%	2,168,833	Mexico	2020
Chiquimula	26.83%	111,368	Guatemala	2018
Delta Amacuro	25.1%	41,543	Venezuela	2011
Los Ríos	25.03%	96,382	Chile	2024
Between 10% and 25%
Cauca	24.81%	308,455	Colombia	2018
Morelos	24.55%	484,008	Mexico	2020
Tarapacá	24.5%	89,987	Chile	2024
Pando	23.78%	26,261	Bolivia	2012
Magallanes	23.4%	38,658	Chile	2024
Tabasco	21.36%	513,194	Mexico	2020
Michoacán	20.75%	985,385	Mexico	2020
San Luis Potosí	20.33%	573,764	Mexico	2020
Santa Cruz	19.65%	521,814	Bolivia	2012
Atacama	25.8%	76,616	Chile	2024
Putumayo	17.90%	50,694	Colombia	2018
Lima	17.82%	128,632	Peru	2017
Lima province	17.16%	1,211,490	Peru	2017
Tlaxcala	16.46%	221,054	Mexico	2020
Nayarit	15.94%	196,931	Mexico	2020
(State of Mexico) Mexico	15.75%	2,676,305	Mexico	2020
Nariño	15.46%	206,455	Colombia	2018
Chocó	14.96%	68,415	Colombia	2018
Retalhuléu	14.95%	48,871	Guatemala	2018
Ica	14.77%	97,863	Peru	2017
Tarija	14.49%	69,872	Bolivia	2012
Roraima	14.12%	89,882	Brazil	2022
Antofagasta	14.5%	91,280	Chile	2024
Alaska	13.46%	98,745	United States	2023
Guatemala	13.34%	402,376	Guatemala	2018
Sonora	13.31%	391,958	Mexico	2020
Colima	13.17%	96,324	Mexico	2020
Querétaro	13.15%	311,453	Mexico	2020
Córdoba	13.03%	202,621	Colombia	2018
Sucre	12.14%	104,890	Colombia	2018
Zulia	12%	443,544	Venezuela	2011
Baja California Sur	11.87%	94,775	Mexico	2020
Callao	11.02%	88,081	Peru	2017
Chihuahua	10.48%	392,147	Mexico	2020
Jujuy	10.07%	81,538	Argentina	2022
Between 5% and 10%
Salta	9.96%	142,870	Argentina	2022
Santiago	7.36%	545,700	Chile	2024
Guaviare	9.38%	6,856	Colombia	2018
Sinaloa	9.35%	283,019	Mexico	2020
New Mexico	9.34%	197,425	United States	2023
Biobío	9.4%	150,917	Chile	2024
Mexico City	9.28%	854,682	Mexico	2020
Durango	8.87%	162,556	Mexico	2020
Coquimbo	11.2%	92,753	Chile	2024
Loreto	8.10%	50,493	Peru	2017
Baja California	7.97%	300,390	Mexico	2020
Chubut	7.92%	46,670	Argentina	2022
Formosa	7.84%	47,459	Argentina	2022
Amazonas	7.74%	305,243	Brazil	2022
South Dakota	7.72%	70,936	United States	2023
Neuquén	7.68%	54,436	Argentina	2022
Jalapa	7.25%	24,891	Guatemala	2018
Oklahoma	7.21%	292,095	United States	2023
Ucayali	7.06%	25,181	Peru	2017
Jalisco	7.04%	587,709	Mexico	2020
Tamaulipas	6.67%	235,299	Mexico	2020
Valparaíso	5.5%	103,716	Chile	2024
Cajamarca	6.47%	66,473	Peru	2017
(Río Negro Province) Río Negro	6.45%	48,194	Argentina	2022
Nuevo León	6.40%	370,204	Mexico	2020
Guanajuato	6.39%	394,067	Mexico	2020
O'Higgins	5.2%	50,681	Chile	2024
Aguascalientes	6.17%	87,959	Mexico	2020
Caldas	6.04%	55,801	Colombia	2018
San Martín	5.85%	35,613	Peru	2017
Montana	5.62%	63,693	United States	2023
Escuintla	5.06%	37,100	Guatemala	2018
Amazonas	5.04%	14,182	Peru	2017
Between 2.5% and 5%
Zacatecas	4.88%	79,160	Mexico	2020
Chaco	4.78%	53,798	Argentina	2022
Lambayeque	4.77%	44,613	Peru	2017
Maule	4.3%	47,811	Chile	2024
Cesar	4.66%	51,233	Colombia	2018
Catamarca	4.60%	19,668	Argentina	2022
North Dakota	4.40%	34,505	United States	2023
La Pampa	4.36%	15,659	Argentina	2022
Arizona	3.96%	294,583	United States	2023
Bolívar	3.9%	54,686	Venezuela	2011
Ñuble	3.9%	20,145	Chile	2024
Santa Cruz	3.73%	12,525	Argentina	2022
Tolima	3.68%	45,269	Colombia	2018
Risaralda	3.56%	29,909	Colombia	2018
Acre	3.51%	29,163	Brazil	2022
Mato Grosso do Sul	3.48%	96,029	Brazil	2022
Tierra del Fuego	3.21%	5,942	Argentina	2022
La Libertad	3.19%	43,960	Peru	2017
La Rioja	2.78%	10,645	Argentina	2022
Arauca	2.74%	6,573	Colombia	2018
Santiago del Estero	2.65%	28,022	Argentina	2022
Sucre	2.50%	22,213	Venezuela	2011
Apure	2.50%	11,559	Venezuela	2011
Between 0% and 2.5%
Caquetá	2.45%	8,825	Colombia	2018
Buenos Aires City	2.41%	74,724	Argentina	2022
Piura	2.35%	33,196	Peru	2017
Mendoza	2.24%	45,389	Argentina	2022
Anzoátegui	2.3%	33,848	Venezuela	2011
Meta	2.23%	20,528	Colombia	2018
Tucumán	2.18%	37,646	Argentina	2022
(Buenos Aires Province) Buenos Aires	2.14%	371,830	Argentina	2022
Coahuila	2.13%	67,026	Mexico	2020
Tumbes	2.10%	3,5946	Peru	2017
Misiones	2.04%	26,006	Argentina	2022
Monagas	2.0%	17,898	Venezuela	2011
Santa Rosa	1.98%	7,863	Guatemala	2018
Zacapa	1.94%	4,769	Guatemala	2018
Córdoba	1.82%	69,218	Argentina	2022
Casanare	1.81%	6,893	Colombia	2018
San Juan	1.76%	14,457	Argentina	2022
Atlántico	1.67%	39,061	Colombia	2018
Magdalena	1.66%	20,938	Colombia	2018
Santa Fe	1.63%	57,193	Argentina	2022
Mato Grosso	1.55%	56,687	Brazil	2022
San Luis	1.54%	8,340	Argentina	2022
El Progreso	1.48%	2,627	Guatemala	2018
Amapá	1.41%	10,340	Brazil	2022
Entre Ríos	1.32%	18,693	Argentina	2022
Corrientes	1.31%	15,808	Argentina	2022
Tocantins	1.24%	18,735	Brazil	2022
Huila	1.21%	12,194	Colombia	2018
Rondônia	1.09%	17,278	Brazil	2022
Jutiapa	0.97%	4,768	Guatemala	2018
Pernambuco	0.92%	83,667	Brazil	2022
Pará	0.85%	25,478	Brazil	2022
Valle del Cauca	0.81%	30,844	Colombia	2018
Maranhão	0.81%	54,682	Brazil	2022
Alagoas	0.64%	20,095	Brazil	2022
Paraíba	0.64%	25,478	Brazil	2022
Antioquia	0.63%	37,628	Colombia	2018
Boyacá	0.63%	7,151	Colombia	2018
Bahia	0.59%	83,658	Brazil	2022
Quindío	0.57%	2,883	Colombia	2018
Ceará	0.45%	39,982	Brazil	2022
Nueva Esparta	0.40%	2,200	Venezuela	2011
Cundinamarca	0.36%	9,949	Colombia	2018
Norte de Santander	0.34%	4,545	Colombia	2018
Rio Grande do Sul	0.31%	34,184	Brazil	2022
Espírito Santo	0.30%	11,617	Brazil	2022
Mérida	0.30%	2,103	Venezuela	2011
Rio Grande do Norte	0.28%	9,385	Brazil	2022
Bogotá	0.27%	19,063	Colombia	2018
Bolívar	0.27%	5,204	Colombia	2018
Santa Catarina	0.25%	19,294	Brazil	2022
Paraná	0.24%	28,000	Brazil	2022
Sergipe	0.21%	4,580	Brazil	2022
(Federal District (Brazil)) Federal District	0.20%	5,536	Brazil	2022
Falcón	0.20%	1,377	Venezuela	2011
Piauí	0.19%	6,198	Brazil	2022
Minas Gerais	0.16%	31,885	Brazil	2022
Goiás	0.15%	10,432	Brazil	2022
São Paulo	0.11%	50,528	Brazil	2022
Rio de Janeiro	0.10%	15,904	Brazil	2022
Miranda	0.10%	3,348	Venezuela	2011
Distrito Capital	0.10%	2,888	Venezuela	2011
Carabobo	0.10%	2,198	Venezuela	2011
Lara	0.10%	2,112	Venezuela	2011
Aragua	0.10%	1,453	Venezuela	2011
Barinas	0.10%	1,095	Venezuela	2011
Guárico	0.10%	948	Venezuela	2011
Trujillo	0.10%	888	Venezuela	2011
Portuguesa	0.10%	666	Venezuela	2011
Táchira	0.10%	589	Venezuela	2011
Yaracuy	0.10%	496	Venezuela	2011
Vargas	0.10%	336	Venezuela	2011
Cojedes	0.10%	289	Venezuela	2011
Santander	0.06%	1,262	Colombia	2018
San Andrés y Providencia	0.04%	20	Colombia	2018
Dependencias Federales	<0.01%	1	Venezuela	2011
Source: Censuses of American countries (Not including mixed-race people or mestizos).

== See also ==
- Indigenous peoples in Canada
- Native Americans in the United States
- History of Native Americans in the United States
- List of Indian massacres
- List of Indian reserves in Canada by population
- List of Indian reservations in the United States
- Amazonas before the Inca Empire
- American Indian Wars
- Classification of Indigenous peoples of the Americas
- Conquest of the Desert
- Genocide of Indigenous peoples
- Genocides in the Americas
- Guatemalan genocide
- Selknam genocide
- Smallpox epidemics in the Americas
- Trail of Tears
- Indigenous peoples
- Uncontacted peoples
- Racism in Canada#Indigenous peoples
- Racism in North America
- Racism in South America
- Racism in the United States#Native Americans

== Bibliography ==
=== Books ===
- Blackhawk, Ned (2023). "'The Centrality of Dispossession': Native American Genocide and Settler Colonialism". In Blackhawk, Ned; Kiernan, Ben; Madley, Benjamin; Taylor, Rebe (eds.). The Cambridge World History of Genocide. Vol. 2: Genocide in the Indigenous, Early Modern and Imperial Worlds, from c.1535 to World War One. Cambridge University Press. pp. 23–45. doi:10.1017/9781108765480. ISBN 978-1-108-76548-0.
- Bloxham, Donald; Moses, A. Dirk, eds. (2010). The Oxford Handbook of Genocide Studies. Oxford University Press. doi:10.1093/oxfordhb/9780199232116.001.0001. ISBN 978-0-19-923211-6.
- Braun, Harald E. (2023). "Genocidal Massacres in the Spanish Conquest of the Americas: Xaragua, Cholula and Toxcatl, 1503–1519". In Kiernan, Ben; Lemos, T. M.; Taylor, Tristan S. (eds.). The Cambridge World History of Genocide. Vol. 1: Genocide in the Ancient, Medieval and Premodern Worlds. Cambridge University Press. pp. 622–647. doi:10.1017/9781108655989. ISBN 978-1-108-65598-9.
- Cappel, Constance (2007). The smallpox genocide of the Odawa tribe at L'Arbre Croche, 1763: the history of a Native American people. Lewiston, New York: Edwin Mellen Press. ISBN 978-0-7734-5220-6.
- Cook, Noble David (1998). Born to Die: Disease and New World Conquest, 1492–1650. Cambridge University Press. ISBN 978-0-521-62208-0.
- Hanson, Victor Davis (2002). Carnage and culture: landmark battles in the rise of Western power. Anchor Books. ISBN 978-0-385-50052-4.
- Henige, David P. (1998). Numbers from Nowhere: The American Indian Contact Population Debate. Norman : University of Oklahoma Press. ISBN 978-0-8061-3044-6.
- Jennings, Francis (1993). The Founders of America: How Indians discovered the land, pioneered in it, and created great classical civilizations, how they were plunged into a Dark Age by invasion and conquest, and how they are reviving. New York: W. W. Norton & Company. ISBN 978-0-393-03373-1.
- Jones, Adam (2023). Genocide: A Comprehensive Introduction (4th ed.). Taylor & Francis. doi:10.4324/9781003185291. ISBN 978-1-000-95870-6.
- Mann, Charles C. (2005). 1491: New Revelations of the Americas Before Columbus. Knopf. ISBN 978-1-4000-4006-3.
- McNeill, J. R.; Pomeranz, Kenneth, eds. (2015). Production, Destruction and Connection, 1750-Present, Part 1, Structures, Spaces, and Boundary Making. The Cambridge World History. Vol. 7. Cambridge University Press. doi:10.1017/CBO9781139196079. ISBN 978-1-108-40775-5.
- Ramenofsky, Ann (1988). Vectors of Death: The Archaeology of European Contact. Albuquerque, New Mexico: University of New Mexico Press. ISBN 978-0-8263-0997-6.
- Reséndez, Andrés (2016). The Other Slavery: The Uncovered Story of Indian Enslavement in America. Houghton Mifflin Harcourt. ISBN 978-0-547-64098-3.
- Royal, Robert. 1492 and All That: Political Manipulations of History. Washington, D.C.: Ethics and Public Policy Center, 1992.
- Shoemaker, Nancy (1999). American Indian population recovery in the twentieth century. University of New Mexico Press. ISBN 978-0-8263-1919-7.
- Stannard, David E. (1993). American Holocaust: The Conquest of the New World. Oxford University Press, US. ISBN 978-0-19-508557-0.
- Stearn, E. Wagner and Allen E. Stearn. The Effect of Smallpox on the Destiny of the Amerindian. Boston: Humphries, 1945.
- Thornton, Russel (1987). American Indian Holocaust and Survival: ˜a Œpopulation History Since 1492. Norman : University of Oklahoma Press. ISBN 978-0-8061-2074-4.

=== Online sources ===
- Lewy, Guenter. "Were American Indians the Victims of Genocide?", History News Network, originally published in Commentary.
- Lord, Lewis. How many people were here before Columbus? at the Wayback Machine (archived 22 September 2006), 10 August 1997.
- Rummel, R.J. Death by Government, Chapter 3: Pre-Twentieth Century Democide
- Stutz, Bruce. Megadeath in Mexico Discover, 21 February 2006.
- White, Matthew. "The Annihilation of the Native Americans". Amateur website, but reports data from scholarly sources.
- Jeffrey Amherst and Smallpox Blankets "Lord Jeffrey Amherst's letters discussing germ warfare against American Indians" Retrieved February 2007
