= Le livre des sauvages =

19th-century hoax manuscript

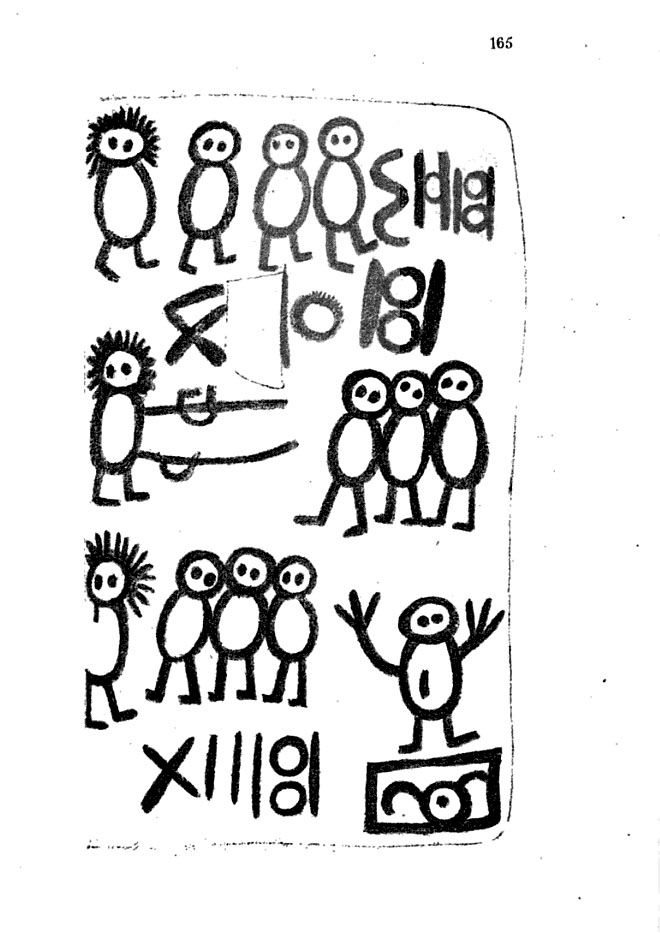
The 165th page of Le livre des sauvages au point de vue de la civilization

Le livre des sauvages au point de vue de la civilization (transl. The book of savages from the perspective of civilization) was a 19th-century hoax manuscript.

The French missionary Emmanuel Domenech's work Manuscrit pictographique américain, précédé d'une notice sur l'idéographie des Peaux Rouges (Paris, 1860) was the result of an unintentional hoax. The German orientalist Julius Petzholdt declared that the manuscript consisted only of scribbling and incoherent illustrations in a local German dialect. Domenech maintained the authenticity of the manuscript in a pamphlet entitled La vérité sur le livre des sauvages (1861), which drew forth a reply from Petzholdt, translated into French (by Philippe Van der Haeghen) under the title of Le livre des sauvages au point de vue de la civilization Française (Brussels, 1861).
