= Emmanuel Domenech =

French abbé, missionary and author

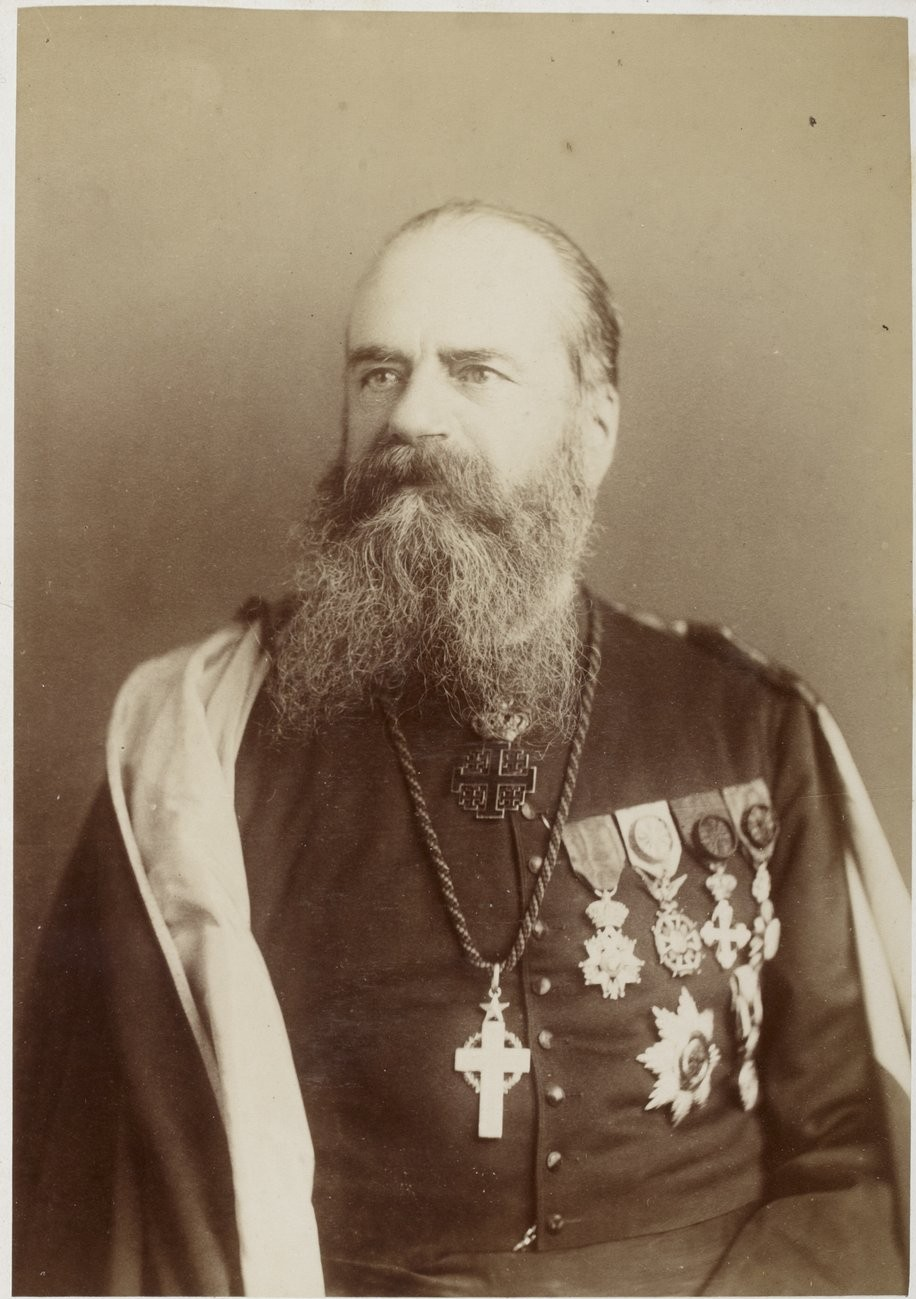
Emmanuel Domenech; photograph by Alphonse Liébert (1884)

Emmanuel-Henri-Dieudonné Domenech (4 November 1825 – 7 September 1903) was a French abbé, missionary and author.

== Life ==
Domenech was born at Rochetaillée-sur-Saône (near Lyon), France. In the spring of 1846, before completing his seminary studies and when not yet twenty years of age, he left France in response to an urgent appeal for missionaries to help develop the Catholic Church in the wilds of Texas, then rapidly filling up with American and European immigration. He went first to St. Louis, where he spent two years completing his theological course, studying English and German, and gathering knowledge of missionary requirements.

In May 1848, he was assigned to duty at the new German settlement of Castroville in Texas. In 1850 he visited Europe and was received by Pope Pius IX, who personally paid for his return to Texas.

Once in Texas again, he was transferred by Bishop Odin to Brownsville, arriving in May 1851. The war with Mexico was just concluded; raiding bands of Mexicans and Rangers were ravaging on both sides of the Rio Grande, while outlaws from the border States and almost equally lawless discharged soldiers filled the new towns, and hostile Indians hovered constantly in the background. A cholera epidemic added its horrors. Nevertheless, he went to work in Southern Texas. He continued in the mission field until September 1852, when he returned to France with health broken and was appointed titulary canon of Montpellier.

When the French troops were dispatched to Mexico in 1861 he was selected to accompany the expedition as almoner to the army and chaplain to the Emperor Maximilian. After returning to France, he devoted his remaining years to European travel, study, and writing, and the exercise of his ecclesiastical functions. In 1882–83 he again visited America.

== Works ==
Among numerous works dealing with travel, history, and theology, are:

- Journal d'un missionnaire au Texas et au Mexique (Paris, 1857)
- Voyage dans les solitudes américaines, le Minnesota (Paris, 1858)
- Manuscrit pictographique américain, précédé d'une notice sur l'idéographie des Peaux Rouges (Paris, 1860) This work was the result of an unintentional hoax. The German orientalist Julius Petzholdt declared that the manuscript consisted only of scribbling and incoherent illustrations in a local German dialect. Domenech maintained the authenticity of the manuscript in a pamphlet entitled La vérité sur le livre des sauvages (1861), which drew forth a reply from Petzholdt, translated into French (by Philippe Van der Haeghen) under the title of Le livre des sauvages au point de vue de la civilization Française (Brussels, 1861).
- Voyage pittoresque dans les grands déserts du Nouveau monde (1860)
- Les Gorges du Diable, voyage en Islande (1864)
- Legendes islandaises (1865)
- Le Mexique tel qu'il est (1867)
- Histoire du jansénisme
- Histoire du Mexique, Juarez et Maximilien, correspondances inédites (Paris, 1868) The historical accuracy of this work has been questioned by several writers, including General Prim.
- Quand j'etais journaliste (1869)
- Histoire de la campagne de 1870-'1 et de la deuxième ambulance de la presse Française (1871)
- L'écriture syllabique (Maya) dans le Yucatan d'après les decouvertes de l'Abbé Brasseur de Bourboug (1883)
- Souvenirs d'outre-mer (Paris, 1884)

His principal works have appeared also in English translation.
