= Louis-Narcisse Baudry Des Lozieres =

Louis-Narcisse Baudry Des Lozières (1761–1841) was a French refugee from Saint-Domingue that explored the French colonial empire between the years 1794 and 1805, and wrote many historical documents.

He was the son of Pierre Baudry, a Captain of the regiment of Nassau. In his book titled "Voyage a la Louisiane: et sur le continent de L'Amérique septentrionale, fait dans les années 1794 à 1798" and "Second voyage à la Louisiane en 1802" he wrote that "The ground is suitable for the cultivation of the sugar. The land is so vast that it could harvest nearly a billion pounds annually." referring to the North American continent.

== Bibliography ==
- Notices adressées à MM. les habitants
- Voyage a la Louisiane: et sur le continent de L'Amérique septentrionale, fait dans les années 1794 à 1798
- Second voyage à la Louisiane en 1802
- Les égaremens du nigrophilisme
