= 2012 Bolivian census =

Eleventh Census of Bolivia
- 21 November 2012

General information
- Country: Bolivia

Results
- Total population: 10,027,254 (▲21.8%)
- Most populous department: La Paz (2,706,35)
- Least populous department: Pando (110,436)

The Eleventh Census of Bolivia was conducted on 21 November 2012. The population was 10,027,254.
