= Francis Jennings =

American historian

- Born: 1918; Pottsville, Pennsylvania, U.S.
- Died: November 17, 2000 (aged 81–82)
- Other name: Fritz Jennings
- Education: Temple University
- Occupations: Historian, author
- Organization(s): Cedar Crest College (1968-1976); Moore College of Art (1966-1968); D'Arcy McNickle Center for American Indian History (director)
- Known for: The Invasion of America: Indians, Colonialism, and the Cant of Conquest (1975); The Creation of America: Through Revolution to Empire (2000)
- Spouse: Joan Woollcott

Francis Paul "Fritz" Jennings (1918 – November 17, 2000) was an American historian, best known for his works on the colonial history of the United States. He taught at Cedar Crest College from 1968 to 1976, and at the Moore College of Art from 1966 to 1968.

== Biography ==
=== Early life and education ===
Jennings was born in Pottsville, Pennsylvania, in 1918, just before the close of World War I. He graduated from Pottsville High School in 1935 and Temple University in 1939. After graduating from Temple University, he stayed in Philadelphia and taught high school English and history at Franklin High School. He then married Joan Woollcott, and started a family.

After the outbreak of World War II, he joined the United States Army in 1942 and attended basic training in Fort Eustis, Virginia. He was then transferred the 231 Station Hospital at Camp Atterbury, Indiana, then to England in 1943, where he was the chief clerk of a headquarters unit. He became a sergeant. After returning home from the war, earned a master's degree in education and two more children were born. Jennings was a teacher in Philadelphia and served as the last president of Local 192 of the American Federation of Teachers before the local was purged for its connections to the Communist Party USA and replaced by the Philadelphia Federation of Teachers.

Jennings earned a PhD in 1965 at the University of Pennsylvania.

=== Career ===
Jennings was interested in American historiography and the influence of ideology in the case of Francis Parkman. In 1956, he purchased a used set of his works. In his reading of Parkman he argued it contained a heavy strain of American exceptionalism or ideology and revisited Parkman's sources. The Omohundro Institute of Early American History and Culture published his own work on colonial Indian relationships offered by Parkman in the Watergate-era titled Invasion of America: Indians, Colonialism, and the Cant of Conquest.

=== Later life and death ===
Jennings spent his last years as the Senior Research Fellow at the Newberry Library of Chicago and earlier as the director of the Newberry Library's D'Arcy McNickle Center for American Indian History. He died on November 17, 2000, after a long illness.

== Bibliography ==
=== Selected works ===
- The "Covenant Chain" trilogy:
  - The Invasion of America: Indians, Colonialism and the Cant of Conquest (1975)
  - The Ambiguous Iroquois Empire: The Covenant Chain Confederation of Indian Tribes with English Colonies (1984); New York: Norton.
  - Empire of Fortune (1990); W. W. Norton & Company
- The Creation of America: Through Revolution to Empire (2000); New York: Cambridge University Press.
- The Founders of America (1993)

=== Articles and essays ===
- Jennings, Francis. "The Indians' Revolution". Alfred F. Young (ed.). The American Revolution: Explorations in the History of American Radicalism. DeKalb: Northern Illinois University Press, 1976.
- Jennings, Francis. "James Logan". American National Biography. 13: pages 836–37. Ed. John A. Garraty and Mark C. Carnes. New York: Oxford University Press, 1999. ISBN 0-19-512792-7.
