= James Teit =

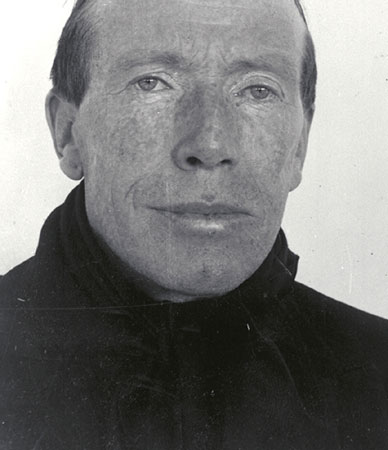
Portrait of James Teit

James Alexander Teit (15 April 1864 — 30 October 1922) was an anthropologist, photographer and guide who worked with Franz Boas to study Interior Salish First Nations peoples in the late 19th and early 20th centuries. He led expeditions throughout British Columbia and made many contributions towards native ethnology. He also worked with Edward Sapir of the Geological Survey of Canada in 1911.

In the later part of his life Teit worked tirelessly with the native people to preserve their human rights, as discussed by Wendy Wickwire in her work At the Bridge.

Teit was born in Lerwick, Shetland, Scotland but immigrated to Canada and married a Nlaka'pamux woman named Susanna Lucy Antko. It was through his wife that he became knowledgeable of the culture and language of the Nlaka'pamux people. Lucy died of pneumonia in 1899. After his wife's death Teit moved to the small town of Spences Bridge, British Columbia. While living there he married Josephine Morens. Together they had six children: Erik 1905, Inga 1907, Magnus 1909, Rolf 1912, Sigurd 1915, and Thorald 1919. Inga and Erik are buried in the Morens family graveyard with their baby brother. James and Josephine are buried in Merritt B.C.

== Publications by James Teit ==
- Teit, James; Boas, Franz (1900). The Thompson Indians of British Columbia (PDF). Memoirs of the American Museum of Natural History. The Jesup North Pacific Expedition. Vol. II, Pt. IV. New York, American Museum of Natural History. AMNH Digital Repository.
- Teit, James (1906). The Lillooet Indians (PDF). Memoirs of the American Museum of Natural History. The Jesup North Pacific Expedition. Vol. II, Pt. V. New York, American Museum of Natural History. AMNH Digital Repository.
- Teit, James (1909). The Shuswap (PDF). Memoirs of the American Museum of Natural History. The Jesup North Pacific Expedition. Vol. II, Pt. VII. New York, American Museum of Natural History. AMNH Digital Repository.
- Teit, James (1912). Mythology of the Thompson Indians (PDF). Memoirs of the American Museum of Natural History. The Jesup North Pacific Expedition. Vol. VIII, Pt. II. New York, American Museum of Natural History. AMNH Digital Repository.
- Teit, James A. (1912). "On Tahltan (Athabaskan) Work, 1912." Summary Report of the Geological Survey of Canada 1912 . (1914) Ottawa, Department of Mines. p. 484-487.GEOSCAN.
- Haeberlin, H. K., Teit, James A., Roberts, Helen H., and Boas, Franz. (1930). "Coiled Basketry in British Columbia and Surrounding Region." Forty-first Annual Report of the Bureau of American Ethnology, 1927-1928. Vol. 41, p. 441-522. Washington D.C., Smithsonian Bureau of American Ethnology. Description of whole report by archive.org.
- Teit, James A. (1930). "Ethnobotany of the Thompson Indians, British Columbia." Forty-fifth Annual Report of the Bureau of American Ethnology, 1927-1928. Vol. 45, p. 441-522. Washington D.C., Smithsonian Bureau of American Ethnology. Description of whole report by archive.org.
- Teit, James A. (1930). "The Salishan Tribes of the Western Plateaus." Forty-fifth Annual Report of the Bureau of American Ethnology, 1927-1928. Vol. 45, p. 23-396. Washington D.C., Smithsonian Bureau of American Ethnology. Description of whole report by archive.org.
- Teit, James A. (1930). "Tattooing and Face and Body Painting of the Thompson Indians, British Columbia." Forty-fifth Annual Report of the Bureau of American Ethnology, 1927-1928. Vol. 45, p. 397-439. Washington D.C., Smithsonian Bureau of American Ethnology. Description of whole report by archive.org.
