= Leon Friedman (politician) =

American politician (1886–1948)

Louisiana State Representative from Natchitoches Parish
- In office 1932–1940
- Preceded by: Two-member delegation: Cecil B. McClung Edward C. Prudhomme
- Succeeded by: Two-member delegation: Arthur C. Watson John O. Williams

Personal details
- Born: October 23, 1886 Natchez; Natchitoches Parish; Louisiana, USA
- Died: September 1, 1948 (aged 61)
- Resting place: Jewish Cemetery in Natchitoches, Louisiana
- Party: Democratic
- Relations: J. Isaac Friedman (brother); Sylvan Friedman (nephew)
- Parent(s): Samuel and Caroline Friedman

Leon Friedman (October 23, 1886 – September 1, 1948) was a Democrat who served from 1932 to 1940 as a member of the Louisiana House of Representatives from his native Natchitoches Parish, Louisiana.

Friedman was a member of a prominent landowning Jewish family from Natchez in southern Natchitoches Parish. His father, Samuel Friedman (1848-1888), died when Leon was barely a year old. This left his mother, Caroline S. Friedman (1847-1906), as head of the household. A brother, Harry, died in 1895 at the age of fourteen. An older brother, J. Isaac Friedman, served in the state House from 1908 to 1916 and in the Louisiana State Senate for an abbreviated term from 1922 to 1924, following the resignation of Charles Milton Cunningham, the editor and publisher of The Natchitoches Times. The Friedmans are interred at the Jewish Cemetery in Natchitoches.

Leon and J. Isaac Friedman were not the first Jewish representatives from Natchitoches Parish. Earlier, Leopold Caspari, who in 1884 pushed successfully for the creation of Northwestern State University, also served in both houses of the legislature, nonconsecutively between 1884 and his death in 1915.

Political offices
Preceded by Two-member delegation: Cecil B. McClung; Edward C. Prudhomme	Louisiana State Representative from Natchitoches Parish; 1932 – 1940; Served alongside: W. Peyton Cunningham)	Succeeded by Two-member delegation: Arthur C. Watson; John O. Williams
