= List of Northwestern State University alumni =

This is a list of notable alumni of Northwestern State University.

== Business ==
- Darryl Willis (1991), BP vice president in charge of claims in the Deepwater Horizon oil spill

== Clergy ==
- Billy McCormack, pastor
- Amy Dafler Meaux, Episcopal priest

== Education ==
- Monnie T. Cheves (circa class of 1923), Northwestern State University education professor and member of the Louisiana House of Representatives
- Dan Flores, historian of the American West and A.B. Hammond Chair in Western History at the University of Montana in Missoula, Montana
- Garnie W. McGinty, historian and professor at Western Kentucky University, Northwestern State University, and Louisiana Tech
- Randy Moffett, president of the University of Louisiana System

== Entertainment ==
- Lindsey Evans, model
- Robert Harling (born 1960), movie screenwriter, producer, and director
- Andy Field, voice actor

== Law ==
- John B. Fournet (1915), associate and chief justice of the Louisiana Supreme Court, speaker of the Louisiana House, and lieutenant governor

== Military ==
- Guy A. J. LaBoa, lieutenant general in the US Army who commanded the 4th Infantry Division and First United States Army

== Politicians ==
- Larry Bagley, member of the Louisiana House of Representatives f
- Thomas "Bud" Brady (class of 1962), member of the Louisiana House of Representatives
- Cade Brumley, state superintendent of the Louisiana Department of Education
- Henry Burns, member of the Louisiana House of Representatives
- Monnie T. Cheves (class of c. 1923), alumnus and NSU education professor, and member of the Louisiana House of Representatives
- Charles Milton Cunningham, publisher of The Natchitoches Times and member of the Louisiana State Senate
- Israel B. Curtis, member of the Louisiana House of Representatives
- Jackson B. Davis, state senator
- Jason Brian DeWitt, member of the Louisiana House of Representatives for District 25
- William J. "Bill" Dodd, Louisiana lieutenant governor
- Paul Lee Foshee Sr., served Louisiana House of Representatives and Louisiana State Senate
- John B. Fournet (1915), speaker of the Louisiana House, lieutenant governor and associate and chief justice of the Louisiana Supreme Court
- H. M. "Mutt" Fowler, member of the Louisiana House of Representatives
- Lance Harris, member of the Louisiana House of Representatives
- Gerald Long, Louisiana State Senate
- Speedy O. Long, United States House of Representatives
- Newt V. Mills, United States House of Representatives
- Mary Evelyn Parker, Louisiana state treasurer
- Joe R. Salter, speaker of the Louisiana House of Representatives
- Kenneth Michael "Mike" Smith, member of the Louisiana House of Representatives
- Vic Stelly, member of the Louisiana House of Representatives
- Raymond Strother, regional and national political consultant
- Ernest Wooton (born 1941), Louisiana House of Representatives and an Independent candidate for the U.S. Senate in 2010

== Science and medicine ==
- Gordon Gunter, fisheries scientist
- Carolyn Huntoon, scientist with NASA

== Sports ==
- Ricardo Acuña, tennis player
- Kenta Bell, Olympic track and field athlete
- Joe Delaney, football player
- Dennis Duncan, football player
- Mark Duper, football player
- D'or Fischer, basketball player
- David Fry, baseball player
- Linda Harper, basketball coach
- Bobby Hebert, sports radio personality and former football player
- Charley Hennigan, football player
- Brian Lawrence, baseball player
- John McConathy, basketball player
- Terrence McGee, football player
- Craig Nall, football player
- Sammy Joe Odom, football player
- Ed Orgeron, football coach
- David Pittman, football player
- Gary Reasons, football player
- Barry Rubin, football coach
- Jackie Smith, football player

== Writers and journalists ==
- Charles Milton Cunningham, publisher of The Natchitoches Times and member of the Louisiana State Senate
- Harry Middleton, writer
