= Senator Friedman =

Senator Friedman may refer to:

- Cindy Friedman (fl. 2010s), Massachusetts State Senate
- J. Isaac Friedman (1877–1949), Louisiana State Senate
- Louis L. Friedman (1906–1997), New York State Senate
- Sylvan Friedman (1908–1979), Louisiana State Senate
