= Senator Broussard =

Senator Broussard may refer to:

- Edwin S. Broussard (1874–1934), U.S. Senator from Louisiana from 1921 to 1933
- Robert F. Broussard (1864–1918), U.S. Senator from Louisiana from 1915 to 1918
