= 1920 United States Senate election in Louisiana =

1920 Democratic Senate primary election in Louisiana
- September 14, 1920
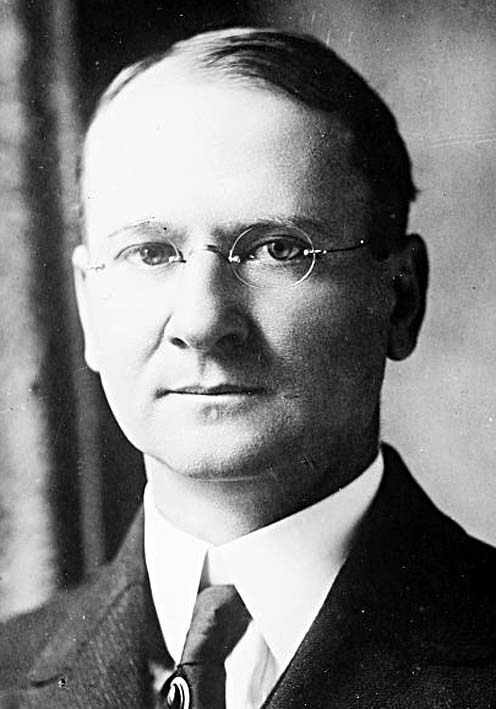

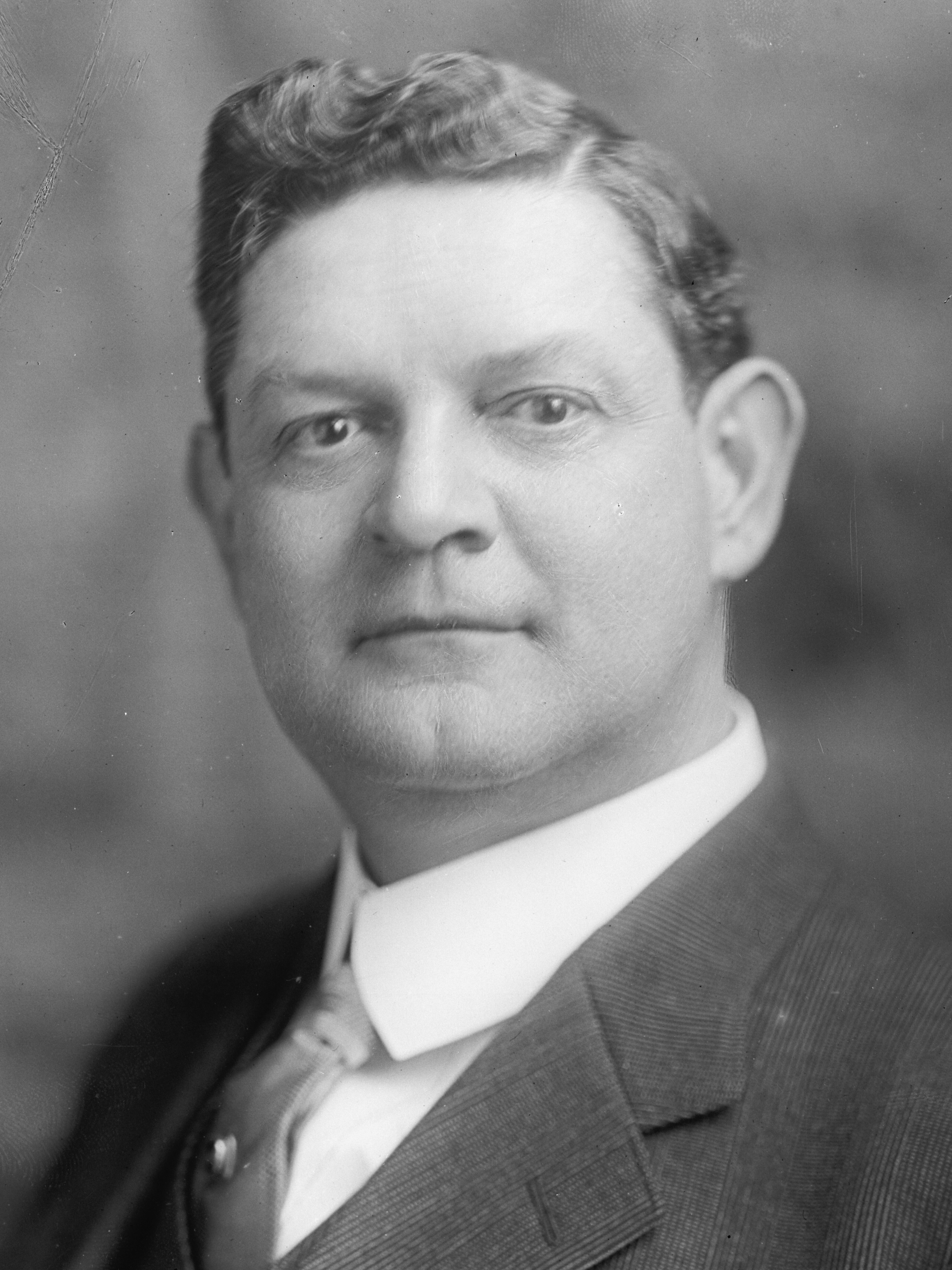

Nominee	Edwin Broussard	Jared Sanders	Donelson Caffery III
Party	Democratic	Democratic	Democratic
Popular vote	49,718	43,425	15,563
Percentage	45.74%	39.95%	14.32%
U.S. senator before election
Edward J. Gay
Democratic
Elected U.S. Senator
Edwin S. Broussard
Democratic

The 1920 United States Senate election in Louisiana was held on November 2, 1920. Incumbent senator Edward J. Gay did not run for re-election.

On September 14, Edwin S. Broussard won the Democratic primary with 45.74% of the vote.

At this time, Louisiana was a one-party state, and the Democratic nomination was tantamount to victory. Broussard won the November general election without an opponent.

== Democratic primary ==
=== Candidates ===
- Edwin S. Broussard, Progressive candidate for lieutenant governor in 1916 and brother of former senator Robert F. Broussard
- Donelson Caffery III, Populist candidate for governor in 1900 and son of former senator Donelson Caffery
- Jared Y. Sanders Sr., U.S. Representative from Franklin and former governor of Louisiana

=== Results ===
1920 United States Senate Democratic primary
Party	Candidate	Votes	%
Democratic	Edwin S. Broussard	49,718	45.74%
Democratic	Jared Y. Sanders Sr.	43,425	39.95%
Democratic	Donelson Caffery III	15,563	14.32%
Total votes		108,706	100.00%

== General election ==
1920 United States Senate election
Party	Candidate	Votes	%	±%
Democratic	Edwin S. Broussard	94,944	100.00%	Steady
Total votes		94,944	100.00%	
