= J. Isaac Friedman =

American politician (1871–1949)

John Isaac Friedman

Louisiana State Representative for Natchitoches Parish
- In office 1944–1948
- Preceded by: Three-member district: C. Chaplin Jr. E. E. Hammett P. A. Sompayrae
- Succeeded by: Three-member district: Upshur P. Breazeale; Phanor O. Cox Dr. John J. Kelly

Louisiana State Senator from Natchitoches and Red River parishes
- In office 1922–1924
- Preceded by: Charles Milton Cunningham
- Succeeded by: G. F. Thomas

Personal details
- Born: 1877 Natchitoches Parish, Louisiana, US
- Died: 1949 (aged 71–72) New Orleans, Louisiana, US
- Resting place: Jewish Cemetery in Natchitoches, Louisiana
- Party: Democratic
- Relations: Leon Friedman (brother); Sylvan Friedman (nephew)

John Isaac Friedman, known as J. Isaac Friedman (October 1871 – December 11, 1949), was an American politician who served in the Louisiana House of Representatives from 1908 to 1916 and in the Louisiana State Senate from 1922 to 1924 following the resignation of Charles Milton Cunningham. He represented the Democratic Party.

Political offices
Preceded by Three-member district: C. Chaplin Jr. E. E. Hammett P. A. Sompayrae	Louisiana State Representative for Natchitoches Parish; John Isaac Friedman (alongside William Tharp Cunningham, Paul M. Potts, and Joseph C. Henry); 1944 – 1948	Succeeded by Three-member district: Upshur P. Breazeale; Phanor Olander Cox Dr. John J. Kelly
Preceded by Charles Milton Cunningham	Louisiana State Senator for Natchitoches and Red River parishes J. Isaac Friedman; 1922 – 1924	Succeeded by G. F. Thomas
