= Vern Roberson =

American gridiron football player (born 1952)

No. 16, 18, 42, 49
- Position: Safety

Personal information
- Born: August 3, 1952 (age 74); Natchitoches, Louisiana, U.S.
- Listed height: 6 ft 1 in (1.85 m)
- Listed weight: 195 lb (88 kg)

Career information
- High school: Central (Natchitoches)
- College: Grambling State (1970–1973)
- NFL draft: 1974: undrafted

Career history
- Miami Dolphins (1974)*; Birmingham Americans (1974); Calgary Stampeders (1975–1976); Ottawa Rough Riders (1976); Miami Dolphins (1977); San Francisco 49ers (1978); New York Giants (1979)*
- * Offseason or practice squad member only

Awards and highlights
- PFWA All-Rookie Team (1977); CFL All-Star (1975); CFL West All-Star (1975)
- Stats at Pro Football Reference

Vernon Lee Roberson (born August 3, 1952) is an American former professional football defensive back who played two seasons in the National Football League (NFL) with the Miami Dolphins and San Francisco 49ers. He played college football at Grambling State University. He also played for the Calgary Stampeders and Ottawa Rough Riders of the Canadian Football League (CFL).

== Early life and college ==
Vernon Lee Roberson was born on August 3, 1952, in Natchitoches, Louisiana. He was raised on a farm with nine brothers and six sisters. He attended Natchitoches Central High School in Natchitoches.

Roberson was a member of the Grambling State Tigers of Grambling State University from 1970 to 1973.

== Professional career ==
Roberson signed with the Miami Dolphins after going undrafted in the 1974 NFL draft. On September 12, 1974, it was reported he had been waived.

Roberson signed with the Birmingham Americans of the World Football League on September 15, 1974, but was released before playing any games.

Roberson dressed in all 16 games for the Calgary Stampeders of the Canadian Football League (CFL) in 1975, recording ten interceptions for 145 yards and two touchdowns, five kickoff returns for 107 yards, and 18 punt returns for 98 yards. The Stampeders finished the year with a 6–10 record. Roberson earned CFL All-Star and CFL West All-Star honors for his performance during the 1975 season. Roberson dressed in nine games in 1976, totaling three interceptions for 51 yards and three kickoff returns for 77 yards. After Calgary began the 1976 season winless, Roberson requested his release in late September.

Roberson was then claimed off waivers by the Ottawa Rough Riders. He had not planned on playing for the Rough Riders but ended up joining the team after persistence from Ottawa head coach George Brancato. Roberson dressed in two games for the Rough Riders as an injury replacement for Wonder Monds. In November 1976, Roberson voluntarily left the team after a poor performance in the final game of the regular season, stating "it's too cold to play football in Canada."

Roberson signed with the Miami Dolphins in 1977. He played in all 14 games, starting nine, for the Dolphins during the 1977 season and recorded one interception. He was named to the PFWA All-Rookie Team for his performance during the 1977 season.

On April 17, 1978, the Dolphins traded Roberson, Freddie Solomon, a 1978 first round draft pick, and a 1978 fifth-round pick to the San Francisco 49ers for Delvin Williams. Roberson appeared in all 16 games, starting 12, for the 49ers in 1978, totaling one interception and two fumble recoveries. On July 13, 1979, it was reported that he had been waived.

Roberson signed with the New York Giants on July 16, 1979, but was later released.
