= 1926 United States Senate election in Louisiana =

1926 Democratic Senate primary election in Louisiana
- September 14, 1926
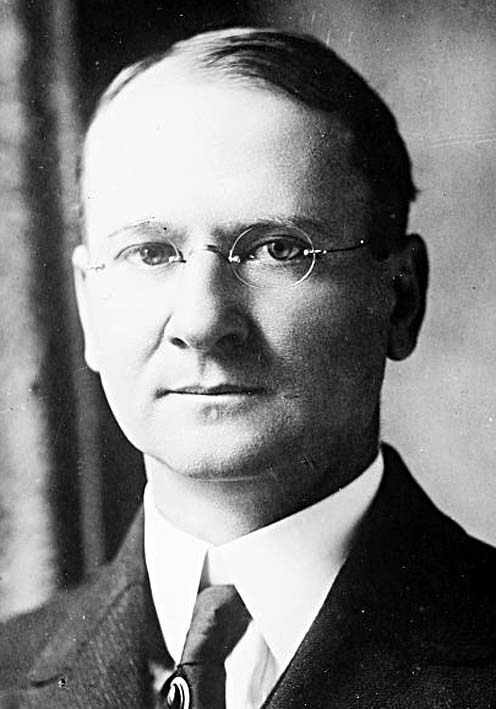

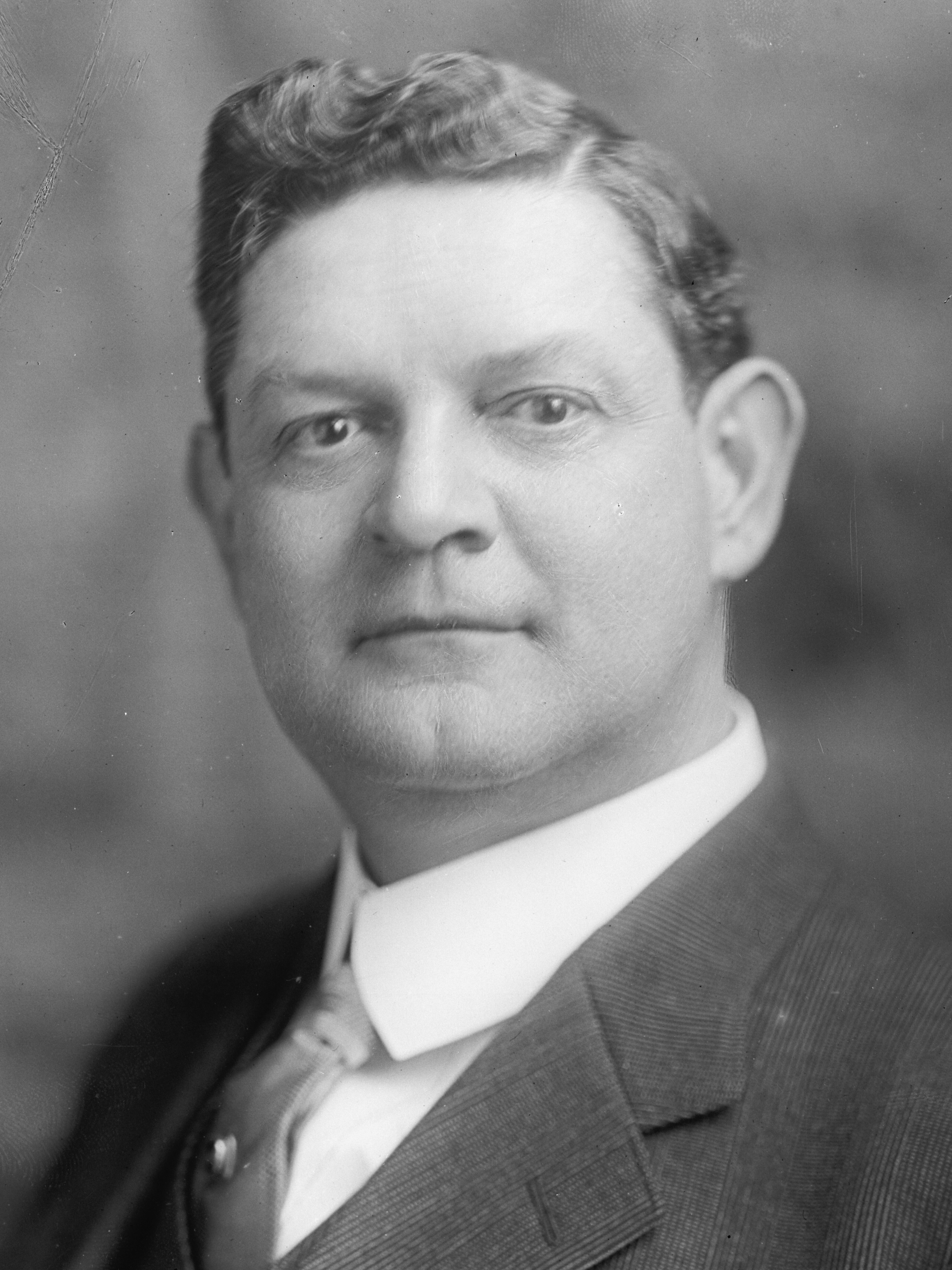
Nominee	Edwin S. Broussard	Jared Sanders
Party	Democratic	Democratic
Popular vote	84,041	80,562
Percentage	51.06%	48.94%
U.S. senator before election
Edwin S. Broussard
Democratic
Elected U.S. Senator
Edwin S. Broussard
Democratic

The 1926 United States Senate election in Louisiana was held on November 2, 1926. Incumbent Democratic Senator Edwin Broussard was elected to a second term in office.

On September 14, Broussard won the Democratic primary against Rep. Jared Sanders with 51.06% of the vote.

At this time, Louisiana was a one-party state (no other party had run a candidate for Senate since the passage of the Seventeenth Amendment), and the Democratic nomination was tantamount to victory. Broussard won the November general election without an opponent.

== Democratic primary ==
=== Candidates ===
- Edwin S. Broussard, incumbent Senator
- Jared Y. Sanders Sr., U.S. Representative from Franklin and former Governor of Louisiana

=== Results ===
1926 United States Senate Democratic primary
Party	Candidate	Votes	%
Democratic	Edwin S. Broussard (incumbent)	84,041	51.06%
Democratic	Jared Y. Sanders Sr.	80,562	48.94%
Total votes		306,399	100.00%

== General election ==
1926 United States Senate election
Party	Candidate	Votes	%	±%
Democratic	Edwin S. Broussard (incumbent)	54,180	100.00%	Steady
Total votes		54,180	100.00%	
