= Natchitoches Central High School =

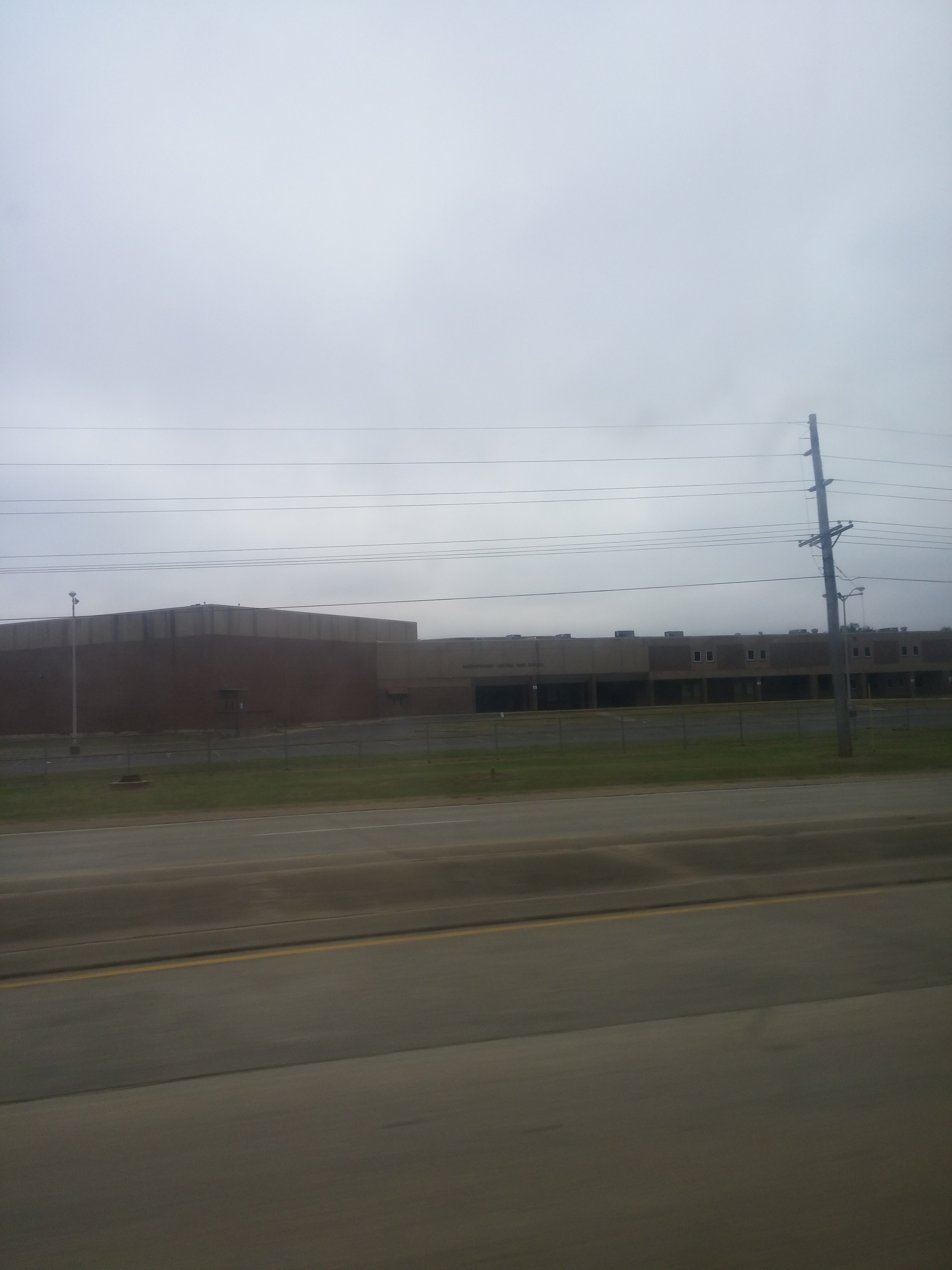
- Building of Natchitoches Central High School in November 8, 2016

Location
- 6513 Highway 1 South Bypass; Natchitoches, Louisiana 71457; United States; 31°44′44″N 93°6′30″W

Information
- Type: Public
- School district: Natchitoches Parish School Board
- Principal: Micah Coleman
- Teaching staff: 88.02 (FTE)
- Grades: 9–12
- Enrollment: 1,211 (2023-2024)
- Student to teacher ratio: 13.76
- Colors: Maroon, gold, and white
- Athletics: Louisiana High School Athletic Association
- Athletics conference: District 2-5A
- Mascot: Leader of the Natchitoches people
- Nickname: Chiefs
- Newspaper: The Chieftain
- Yearbook: The Chinquapin
- Website: School website

Natchitoches Central High School is a public high school in Natchitoches, Louisiana, United States. It is governed by the Natchitoches Parish School Board.

== History ==
The development of Natchitoches Central High School, like many schools in the 1960s and early 1970s, began with federal court orders to desegregate the two major existing high schools in the city of Natchitoches. To insure a smooth transition, the faculties of both Central High School and Natchitoches High School attended a workshop at Northwestern State University to develop curricula, attitudes, and the necessary internal organizations to promote the total school.

The Natchitoches Parish School System was placed under another court order in 1981 to further desegregate its schools. This led to massive consolidation and assigned 10th through 12th grade students from Natchitoches, Allen, Provencal, Marthaville, and Robeline into the new Natchitoches Central High School facility. Ninth grade students were housed at a nearby facility named Natchitoches Ninth Grade Center and operated under a separate administration. Cooperative planning, with reorganization of scheduling and curriculum, was necessary to insure a smooth transition of faculties, students, and communities into the new educational endeavor.

In 1989, Cloutierville High School was closed and those students were assigned to Natchitoches Central High School.

In November 1992, Natchitoches Central High School was one of five Louisiana public high schools nominated for the Blue Ribbon Schools Excellence in Education Award in a national program sponsored by the United States Department of Education.

Major reconstruction began on the facility in 1998, and 24 new rooms were added to the building. The beginning of the 2000 school year marked the consolidation of Natchitoches Central and the Ninth Grade Center and began a new phase in the history of this school.

The Chief is the school mascot, and the school colors are maroon, gold, and white. School publications include a newspaper, The Chieftain, and the yearbook, The Chinquapin.

Natchitoches Central High School principals (since moving into the current facilities):

- Derwood Duke (1981–1988)
- Lester Lee (1988–1990)
- Julio C. Toro (1990–1999)
- Ronnie Waites (1999–2006)
- David Elkins (2006–2010)
- Dale Skinner (2010–2014)
- Bill Gordy (2014–2020)
- Micah Coleman (2021–present)

== Athletics ==
Natchitoches Central High athletics competes in the LHSAA.

== Notable alumni ==
- Monnie T. Cheves (Class of c. 1919, 1902–1988), football and basketball coach at Natchitoches High School; Northwestern State University professor, and member of the Louisiana House of Representatives 1952–1960
- David Dumars, American player of gridiron football
- Joe Dumars, Class of 1981, NBA Hall of Fame
- Paul Foshee, Class of 1950, member of both houses of the Louisiana State Legislature, 1960–1964, 1972–1976
- Sylvan Friedman, member of the Louisiana House of Representatives
- J.D. Garrett, American football halfback for the Boston Patriots 1964–1967
- Pat Listach, Class of 1985, 1992 American League Rookie of the Year
- Vern Roberson, NFL player
