= David Dumars =

American gridiron football player and coach (born 1957)

No. 21
- Position: Defensive back

Personal information
- Born: January 21, 1957 (age 69); Natchitoches, Louisiana, U.S.
- Listed height: 5 ft 10 in (1.78 m)
- Listed weight: 170 lb (77 kg)

Career information
- High school: Central (Natchitoches)
- College: Northeast Louisiana
- NFL draft: 1980: 12th round, 317th overall pick

Career history

Playing
- Montreal Alouettes (1980–1981); New York Jets (1982)*; Denver Gold (1983–1984); Birmingham Stallions (1985)
- * Offseason or practice squad member only

Coaching
- Southeast Missouri State Redhawks (1989–1999) (DB); McNeese State Cowboys basketball (2002–2017) (Asst); Lamar Cardinals basketball (2018–present) (Asst)

David Dumars (born January 21, 1957) is an American former professional football defensive back who played three seasons in the United States Football League (USFL) with the Denver Gold and Birmingham Stallions. He was selected by the New York Jets in the twelfth round of the 1980 NFL draft. He played college football at the Northeast Louisiana University and attended Natchitoches Central High School in Natchitoches, Louisiana.

== Early life ==
Dumars played high school football and basketball for the Natchitoches Central High School Chiefs. He is an older brother of Joe Dumars, who played professional basketball for the Detroit Pistons of the NBA.

== College career ==
Dumars played for the Northeast Louisiana Indians from 1975 to 1979. He first played wide receiver for the Indians before converting to defensive back.

== Professional career ==
Dumars was selected by the New York Jets with the 317th overall pick in the twelfth round in the 1980 NFL draft. He played for the Montreal Alouettes from 1980 to 1981. He was a member of the New York Jets during the 1982 off-season. He was released by the team on September 7, 1982. He played for the Denver Gold from 1983 to 1984. He played for the Birmingham Stallions in 1985.

== Coaching career ==
Dumars began his coaching career for Tallulah High School in Tallulah, Louisiana in 1987. He served as defensive backs coach for the Southeast Missouri State Redhawks of Southeast Missouri State University from 1989 to 1999. He was assistant coach with the McNeese State Cowboys basketball team of McNeese State University team from 2002 to 2018. Dumars joined the Lamar Cardinals basketball staff as an assistant coach in August, 2018.
