= Milton Joseph Cunningham =

American politician (1842–1916)

Milton Joseph "Joe" Cunningham
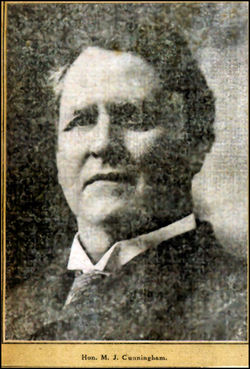

Attorney General of Louisiana
- In office 1884–1888
- Governor: Samuel Douglas McEnery
- Preceded by: James C. Egan
- Succeeded by: Walter Henry Rogers
- In office 1892–1900
- Governor: Murphy J. Foster, Sr.
- Preceded by: Walter Henry Rogers
- Succeeded by: Walter Guion

Louisiana State Senator from Natchitoches and DeSoto parishes
- In office 1880–1884
- Succeeded by: Two-member delegation: J. Fisher Smith Edgar W. Sutherlin

Louisiana State Representative
- In office 1878–1880
- Preceded by: Three-member delegation: L. G. Barron; John G. Lewis Henry Raby
- Succeeded by: Two-member delegation: James H. Cosgrove R. E. Jackson

Personal details
- Born: March 10, 1842 DeSoto Parish; Louisiana, USA
- Died: October 19, 1916 (aged 74) New Orleans, Louisiana
- Cause of death: Atherosclerosis
- Resting place: American Cemetery in Natchitoches, Louisiana
- Party: Democratic
- Spouse(s): (1) Thalia Allen Tharp (married 1866-1872, her death) (2) Anne Peyton (married 1874-1878, her death) (3) Cecile Hertzog (married 1880-1886, her death) (4) Emma Mai Blouin (married 1895-1916, his death )
- Relations: W. Peyton Cunningham (grandson); Mildred Methvin (great-great-granddaughter)
- Children: Twelve children, including: W. T. Cunningham Charles Milton Cunningham
- Parent(s): John Hamilton and Ann Buie Cunningham
- Occupation: Attorney; Landowner

Milton Joseph Cunningham, also known as Joe Cunningham (March 10, 1842 – October 19, 1916) was a Louisiana attorney and politician who served as Attorney General of Louisiana from 1884 to 1888, and from 1892 to 1900.

As Attorney General he submitted the legal brief to the Supreme Court in the case Plessy v. Ferguson arguing in favor of separate rail cars for people of different races.

Cunningham served in the Louisiana House of Representatives from 1878 to 1880 and in the Louisiana State Senate from 1880 to 1884.

Legal offices
Preceded by James C. Egan	Attorney General of Louisiana; Milton Joseph "Joe" Cunningham; 1884 – 1888	Succeeded by Walter Henry Rogers
Preceded by Walter Henry Rogers	Attorney General of Louisiana; Milton Joseph "Joe" Cunningham; 1892 – 1900	Succeeded by Walter Guion
Louisiana State Senate
Preceded by Missing	Louisiana State Senator from Natchitoches and DeSoto parishes Milton Joseph "Joe" Cunningham; 1880 – 1884	Succeeded by J. Fisher Smith; Edgar W. Sutherlin
Louisiana House of Representatives
Preceded by Three-member delegation: L. G. Barron; John G. Lewis Henry Raby	Louisiana State Representative from Natchitoches Parish; Milton Joseph "Joe" Cunningham; 1878 – 1880	Succeeded by Two-member delegation: James H. Cosgrove R. E. Jackson
