= Joe Dumars =

American basketball player and executive (born 1963)

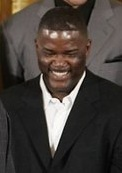
- Dumars in 2005

New Orleans Pelicans
- Title: President of basketball operations
- League: NBA

Personal information
- Born: May 24, 1963 (age 63) Shreveport, Louisiana, U.S.
- Listed height: 6 ft 3 in (1.91 m)
- Listed weight: 195 lb (88 kg)

Career information
- High school: Natchitoches Central (Natchitoches, Louisiana)
- College: McNeese State (1981–1985)
- NBA draft: 1985: 1st round, 18th overall pick
- Drafted by: Detroit Pistons
- Playing career: 1985–1999
- Position: Shooting guard / point guard
- Number: 4

Career history
- 1985–1999: Detroit Pistons

Career highlights
- As player: 2× NBA champion (1989, 1990); NBA Finals MVP (1989); 6× NBA All-Star (1990–1993, 1995, 1997); All-NBA Second Team (1993); 2× All-NBA Third Team (1990, 1991); 4× NBA All-Defensive First Team (1989, 1990, 1992, 1993); NBA All-Defensive Second Team (1991); NBA All-Rookie First Team (1986); No. 4 retired by Detroit Pistons; Southland Player of the Year (1985); 4× First-team All-Southland (1982–1985); No. 4 retired by McNeese State Cowboys; As executive: NBA champion (2004); NBA Executive of the Year (2003)

Career statistics
- Points: 16,401 (16.1 ppg)
- Rebounds: 2,203 (2.2 rpg)
- Assists: 4,612 (4.5 apg)
- Stats at NBA.com
- Stats at Basketball Reference
- Basketball Hall of Fame
- Collegiate Basketball Hall of Fame
Medals
Men's basketball
Representing United States
FIBA World Championship
Gold medal – first place	1994 United States	Team competition

Joe Dumars III (/ˈduːmɑːrz/ DOO-marz; born May 24, 1963) is an American professional basketball executive and former player who is the head of basketball operations for the New Orleans Pelicans. He could play either shooting guard or point guard on offense and was a highly effective defender. He played his entire 14-year career with the Detroit Pistons. During the late 1980s and early 1990s, Dumars and Isiah Thomas combined to form one of the best backcourts in NBA history, winning two championships together. Dumars was inducted into the Basketball Hall of Fame in 2006.

Initially a shooting guard, Dumars moved to point guard following Thomas’ retirement in 1994, sharing ball-handling duties with Grant Hill. Dumars served as the president of basketball operations for the Pistons from 2000 to 2014, winning a third championship as an executive in 2004.

== Early life ==
Dumars was born in Shreveport, Louisiana. Dumars' mother, Ophelia, was a custodian at Northwestern State University in Natchitoches while his father, Joe Dumars Jr. (Big Joe), was a truck driver.

Dumars grew up in an athletic family and he preferred football as a child. All five of his brothers were defensive standouts at Natchitoches Central High School. His brother David played professional football in the USFL. Dumars played defensive back on the football team until junior high school when a big hit on the field directed him toward basketball. His father built a hoop in the backyard, where Dumars would practice his jump shot.

== College career ==
During his four years at McNeese State University, Dumars averaged 22.5 points per game, including 25.8 points per game as a senior – good for sixth in the nation. He finished his college career as the 11th leading scorer in NCAA history.

== Professional career ==
=== Detroit Pistons (1985–1999) ===
Drafted 18th overall in the first round of the 1985 NBA draft, he played guard for the Detroit Pistons for his entire career, from 1985 to 1999. In his rookie campaign, he took over as the Pistons starting shooting guard roughly midway through the season, replacing incumbent starter John Long. He was named to the 1985–86 NBA All-Rookie first team.

Dumars won two NBA championships as a player in 1989 and 1990. In the 1988–89 regular season, he averaged over 17 points per game on 50.5% field goal shooting, while dishing out a career-high 5.7 assists per game as the Pistons posted a then-team record 63 wins. They cruised through the playoffs and faced the Los Angeles Lakers in the NBA Finals for a second straight year. Dumars was voted the 1989 Finals MVP, after averaging 27.3 points per game during the Pistons four-game sweep of the Lakers.

In the 1990 postseason, Dumars won accolades during the Eastern Conference Finals when, with Dennis Rodman, he was a cornerstone of coach Chuck Daly's "Jordan Rules" defensive playbook, which forced the Chicago Bulls to change their offensive strategy to include less of Michael Jordan and more of the other members of the team. According to Jordan, Dumars was the best defender he ever faced in the NBA. In the 1990 NBA Finals against the Portland Trail Blazers, Dumars averaged 20.6 points, including 33 points in a pivotal Game 3 win on June 10 1990 that took place the same day his father had died. With his father's death imminent, Dumars had instructed his wife, Debbie, not to tell him any news about his condition until after the game. However, Debbie did tell Isiah Thomas, who told the rest of the team. After the game, Thomas spoke about an off-balance prayer Dumars tossed up that somehow went in the basket, saying his first thought was, "Your father put that one in, Joe."

During his career, he was selected to the All-Star team six times, and to the All-Defensive first team four times. He led the Pistons in points per game four straight seasons (1990–91 through 1993–94). The 1992–93 season saw Dumars set career highs in points (1,809) and points per game (23.5) while averaging a career-high 40.2 minutes per game. In 14 seasons, all with the Pistons, Dumars scored 16,401 points, handed out 4,612 assists, grabbed 2,203 rebounds and recorded 902 steals.

Although he was a member of the famed "Bad Boys" teams known for their aggressive play and demeanor, he became known for his quiet and upstanding behavior. He was the recipient of the first NBA Sportsmanship Award, for the 1995–96 season. In 2000, this award was renamed the Joe Dumars Trophy in his honor.

His number 4 jersey was retired by the Pistons in March 2000. He has the distinction of being the only Pistons player to ever wear this number since the team moved to Detroit.

He played for the US national team in the 1994 FIBA World Championship, winning the gold medal.

== NBA career statistics ==
Legend
GP	Games played	GS	Games started	MPG	Minutes per game
FG%	Field goal percentage	3P%	3-point field goal percentage	FT%	Free throw percentage
RPG	Rebounds per game	APG	Assists per game	SPG	Steals per game
BPG	Blocks per game	PPG	Points per game	**Bold**	Career high
†	Won an NBA championship	*	Led the league

=== Regular season ===
Year	Team	GP	GS	MPG	FG%	3P%	FT%	RPG	APG	SPG	BPG	PPG
1985–86	Detroit	**82**	45	23.9	.481	.313	.798	1.5	4.8	.8	.1	9.4
1986–87	Detroit	79	75	30.9	.493	.409	.748	2.1	4.5	**1.1**	.1	11.8
1987–88	Detroit	**82**	**82***	33.3	.472	.211	.815	2.4	4.7	**1.1**	**.2**	14.2
1988–89†	Detroit	69	67	34.9	**.505**	**.483**	.850	2.5	**5.7**	.9	.1	17.2
1989–90†	Detroit	75	71	34.4	.480	.400	**.900**	**2.8**	4.9	.8	.0	17.8
1990–91	Detroit	80	80	38.1	.481	.311	.890	2.3	5.5	**1.1**	.1	20.4
1991–92	Detroit	**82**	**82***	38.9	.448	.408	.867	2.3	4.6	.9	.1	19.9
1992–93	Detroit	77	77	**40.2**	.466	.375	.864	1.9	4.0	1.0	.1	**23.5**
1993–94	Detroit	69	69	37.6	.452	.388	.836	2.2	3.8	.9	.1	20.4
1994–95	Detroit	67	67	38.0	.430	.305	.805	2.4	5.5	**1.1**	.1	18.1
1995–96	Detroit	67	40	32.7	.426	.406	.822	2.1	4.0	.6	.0	11.8
1996–97	Detroit	79	79	37.0	.440	.432	.867	2.4	4.0	.7	.0	14.7
1997–98	Detroit	72	72	32.3	.416	.371	.825	1.4	3.5	.6	.0	13.1
1998–99	Detroit	38	38	29.4	.411	.403	.836	1.8	3.5	.6	.1	11.3
Career		1,018	944	34.5	.460	.382	.843	2.2	4.5	.9	.1	16.1
All-Star		6	1	16.3	.400	.333	.500	1.2	3.4	.2	.0	5.7

=== Playoffs ===
Year	Team	GP	GS	MPG	FG%	3P%	FT%	RPG	APG	SPG	BPG	PPG
1986	Detroit	4	4	36.8	**.610**	—	.667	3.3	**6.3**	1.0	.0	15.0
1987	Detroit	15	15	31.5	.538	**.667**	.780	1.3	4.8	.8	.1	12.7
1988	Detroit	**23**	**23**	35.0	.457	.333	.889	2.2	4.9	.6	.1	12.3
1989†	Detroit	17	17	36.5	.455	.083	.861	2.6	5.6	.7	.1	17.6
1990†	Detroit	20	20	37.7	.458	.263	.876	2.2	4.8	**1.1**	.0	18.2
1991	Detroit	15	15	39.2	.429	.405	.845	3.3	4.1	**1.1**	.1	**20.6**
1992	Detroit	5	5	**44.2**	.471	.500	.789	1.6	3.2	1.0	**.2**	16.8
1996	Detroit	3	3	41.0	.457	.357	**1.000**	**4.3**	3.7	.0	.0	13.7
1997	Detroit	5	5	42.8	.361	.261	.950	1.8	2.0	1.0	.0	13.8
1999	Detroit	5	5	30.6	.487	.526	**1.000**	1.4	2.6	.4	.0	10.2
Career		112	112	36.6	.462	.358	.855	2.3	4.6	.8	.1	15.6

== Executive career ==
=== Detroit Pistons (2000–2014) ===
Dumars became the Pistons' president of basketball operations prior to the start of the 2000–01 season. He was voted the league's Executive of the Year for the 2002–03 season and quietly went on to build the team that won the 2004 NBA championship. With the win, Dumars became the first African-American executive to lead a team to an NBA championship. During the 2005–06 season, the Pistons had its best regular season record in franchise history (64–18). The Pistons made it to the Eastern Conference Finals six straight years (2003–2008) under Dumars' watch. This streak would come to an end in the 2008–09 season when the Pistons were swept in the first round by the Cleveland Cavaliers.

On February 9, 2014, Dumars fired Maurice Cheeks as head coach and appointed John Loyer as interim head coach. On April 14, 2014, the Pistons announced that Dumars would step down as president of basketball operations yet remain as an advisor to the organization and its ownership team. During his 14 years as President, Dumars guided the organization to a 595–536 (.527) regular-season record, 73 playoff wins, six Eastern Conference Finals appearances (2003–08), six Central Division titles, two Eastern Conference Championships (2004 and 2005) and the 2004 NBA championship.

=== Sacramento Kings (2019–2022) ===
On June 21, 2019, Dumars was named special advisor to the general manager of the Sacramento Kings. On August 14, 2020, Dumars was named interim executive vice president of basketball operations. On September 17, 2020, he was named chief strategy officer.

=== NBA League Office (2022–2025) ===
On May 2nd 2022, Dumars was named executive vice president and head of basketball operations for the NBA. This role consisted of overseeing all Basketball Operations matters for the NBA, including the development of playing rules and interpretations, conduct and discipline, and policies and procedures relating to the operation of games.

=== New Orleans Pelicans (2025–present) ===
On April 16, 2025, Dumars was hired as the president of basketball operations for the New Orleans Pelicans.

== Business interests ==
Dumars was majority owner as well as CEO and President of Detroit Technologies for approximately 10 years. Founded by Dumars in 1996, Detroit Technologies is an automotive supply company. He sold off his interest in the company in 2006 to pursue other business interests and focus on his role as the Pistons' president of basketball operations.

Dumars was the founder and owner of the Joe Dumars Fieldhouse, an indoor sports and entertainment facility located in Shelby Township and Detroit. The Shelby Township location permanently closed in August 2020 due to the COVID-19 pandemic, with the original location in Detroit closing in May 2022.

In August 2017, Dumars joined Independent Sports & Entertainment, an integrated sports, media and entertainment management agency, as president of its basketball division.

== See also ==
- List of NCAA Division I men's basketball career free throw scoring leaders
- Michigan Sports Hall of Fame
