= Walter Guion =

American politician (1849–1927)

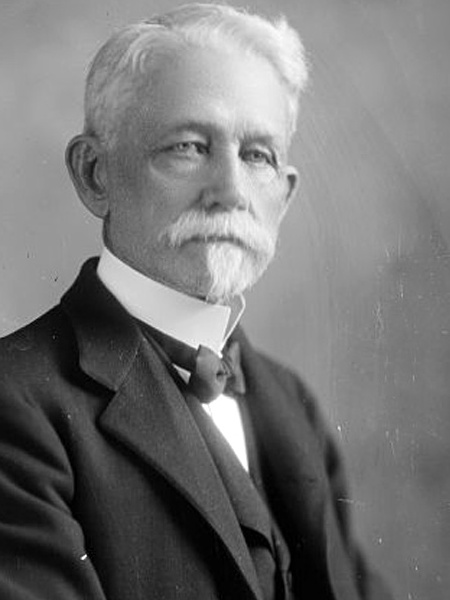

United States Senator from Louisiana
- In office April 22, 1918 – November 5, 1918
- Appointed by: Ruffin Pleasant
- Preceded by: Robert F. Broussard
- Succeeded by: Edward J. Gay

United States Attorney for the Eastern District of Louisiana
- In office 1913–1917
- President: Woodrow Wilson

Attorney General of Louisiana
- In office 1900–1912
- Governor: William W. Heard; Newton C. Blanchard; Jared Y. Sanders Sr.
- Preceded by: Milton Joseph Cunningham
- Succeeded by: Ruffin Pleasant

Personal details
- Born: April 3, 1849 Thibodaux, Louisiana
- Died: February 7, 1927 (aged 77) New Orleans, Louisiana
- Party: Democratic

Walter Guion (April 3, 1849 – February 7, 1927) was a United States senator from Louisiana. Born near Thibodaux, he was tutored at home and then attended Jefferson College in St. James Parish. He moved to Assumption Parish in 1866, was deputy clerk of the court in 1870 - 1871, studied law, was admitted to the bar in 1870 and commenced practice in the Parishes of Assumption, Lafourche, and Ascension. He was judge of the twentieth district from 1888 to 1892 and of the twenty-seventh district from 1892 to 1900, and was Attorney General of the State from 1900 to 1912.

Guion was appointed by President Woodrow Wilson to the office of United States Attorney for the eastern district of Louisiana, which he held from 1913 to 1917, when he resigned. He resumed the practice of law in Napoleonville and Convent. He was chairman of the district exemption board, division number 2, eastern district of Louisiana, and was a member of the State council of defense during the First World War.

On April 22, 1918, Guion was appointed as a Democrat to the U.S. Senate to fill the vacancy caused by the death of Robert F. Broussard and served from April 22, 1918, until November 5, 1918, when a successor was elected; while in the Senate he was chairman of the Committee on Coast and Insular Survey (Sixty-fifth Congress). He practiced law in New Orleans until his death in that city on in 1927; interment was in Metairie Cemetery.

Legal offices
Preceded by Milton Joseph Cunningham	Attorney General of Louisiana; 1900–1912	Succeeded by Ruffin Pleasant
U.S. Senate
Preceded by Robert F. Broussard	U.S. senator (Class 3) from Louisiana; 1918; Served alongside: Joseph E. Ransdell	Succeeded by Edward J. Gay
