= Edward J. Gay (politician, born 1878) =

American politician (1878–1952)

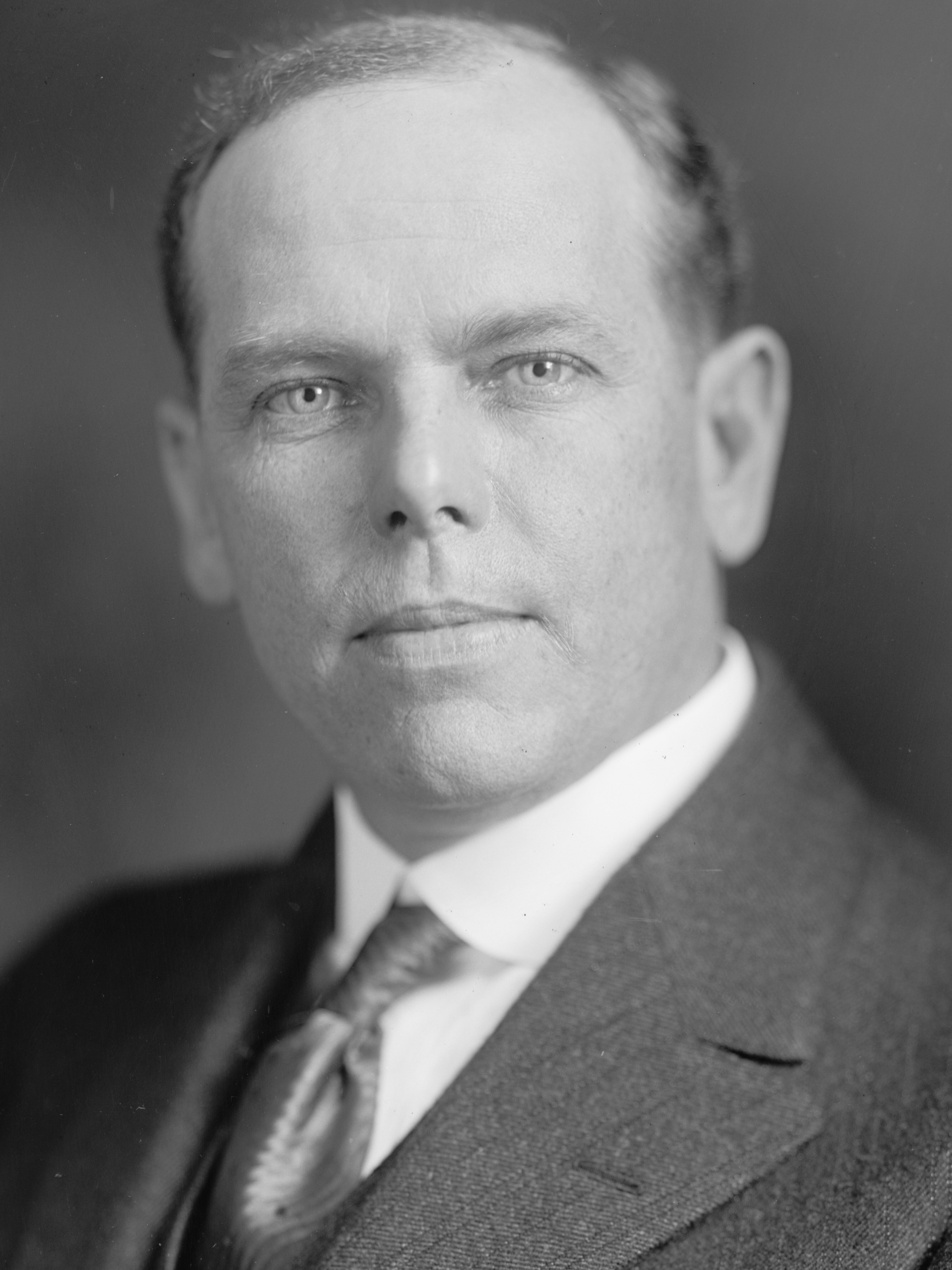

United States Senator from Louisiana
- In office November 6, 1918 – March 3, 1921
- Preceded by: Walter Guion
- Succeeded by: Edwin S. Broussard

Member of the Louisiana House of Representatives
- In office 1904-1918

Personal details
- Born: May 5, 1878 Iberville Parish, Louisiana, US
- Died: December 1, 1952 (aged 74) New Orleans, Louisiana, US
- Party: Democratic

Edward James Gay III (May 5, 1878 – December 1, 1952) was a United States senator from Louisiana. He was a grandson of U.S. Representative Edward James Gay.

Born on Union Plantation in Iberville Parish, he attended Pantops Academy (Charlottesville, Virginia), the Lawrenceville School (in New Jersey), and Princeton University, from which he did not graduate. He engaged in the business of sugar production and the cultivation of various agricultural products. He was a member of the Louisiana House of Representatives from 1904 to 1918.

Gay was elected on November 5, 1918, as a Democrat to the U.S. Senate to fill the vacancy caused by the death of Robert F. Broussard and served from November 6, 1918, to March 3, 1921; he declined to be a candidate for reelection in 1920. He had lost his political power base, due to the advent of John M. Parker. While in the Senate, he was chairman of the Committee on Coast and Insular Survey (Sixty-fifth Congress). Gay was president of a manufacturing company and of the Lake Long Drainage District in Iberville Parish; he died in New Orleans in 1952. Interment was in Metairie Cemetery in New Orleans.

Party political offices
First	Democratic nominee for U.S. Senator from Louisiana (Class 3); 1918	Succeeded by Edwin S. Broussard
U.S. Senate
Preceded by Walter Guion	U.S. senator (Class 3) from Louisiana; November 6, 1918 – March 3, 1921	Succeeded by Edwin S. Broussard
