= W. Peyton Cunningham =

American politician (1901–1971)

- Cunningham in 1962

Member of the Louisiana House of Representatives
- In office 1932–1940

Personal details
- Born: William Peyton Cunningham; October 20, 1901 Natchitoches, Louisiana, U.S.
- Died: January 27, 1971 (aged 69) Alexandria, Louisiana, U.S.
- Party: Democratic
- Children: 3
- Parent: Charles Milton Cunningham (father)
- Relatives: Milton Joseph Cunningham (grandfather); W. T. Cunningham (uncle)

William Peyton Cunningham (October 20, 1901 – January 27, 1971) was an American politician. A member of the Democratic Party, he served in the Louisiana House of Representatives from 1932 to 1940.

== Life and career ==
Cunningham was born in Natchitoches, Louisiana, the son of Charles Milton Cunningham a Louisiana state senator, and Alicia Evelena Payne. He was the grandson of Milton Joseph Cunningham, an attorney general of Louisiana, and was the nephew of W. T. Cunningham, a Louisiana representative.

Cunningham served in the Louisiana House of Representatives from 1932 to 1940. After his service in the House, he worked as an attorney in Natchitoches, Louisiana.

== Death ==
Cunningham died on January 27, 1971, at the Alexandria Hospital in Alexandria, Louisiana, at the age of 69.
