= Edwin S. Broussard =

American politician (1874–1934)

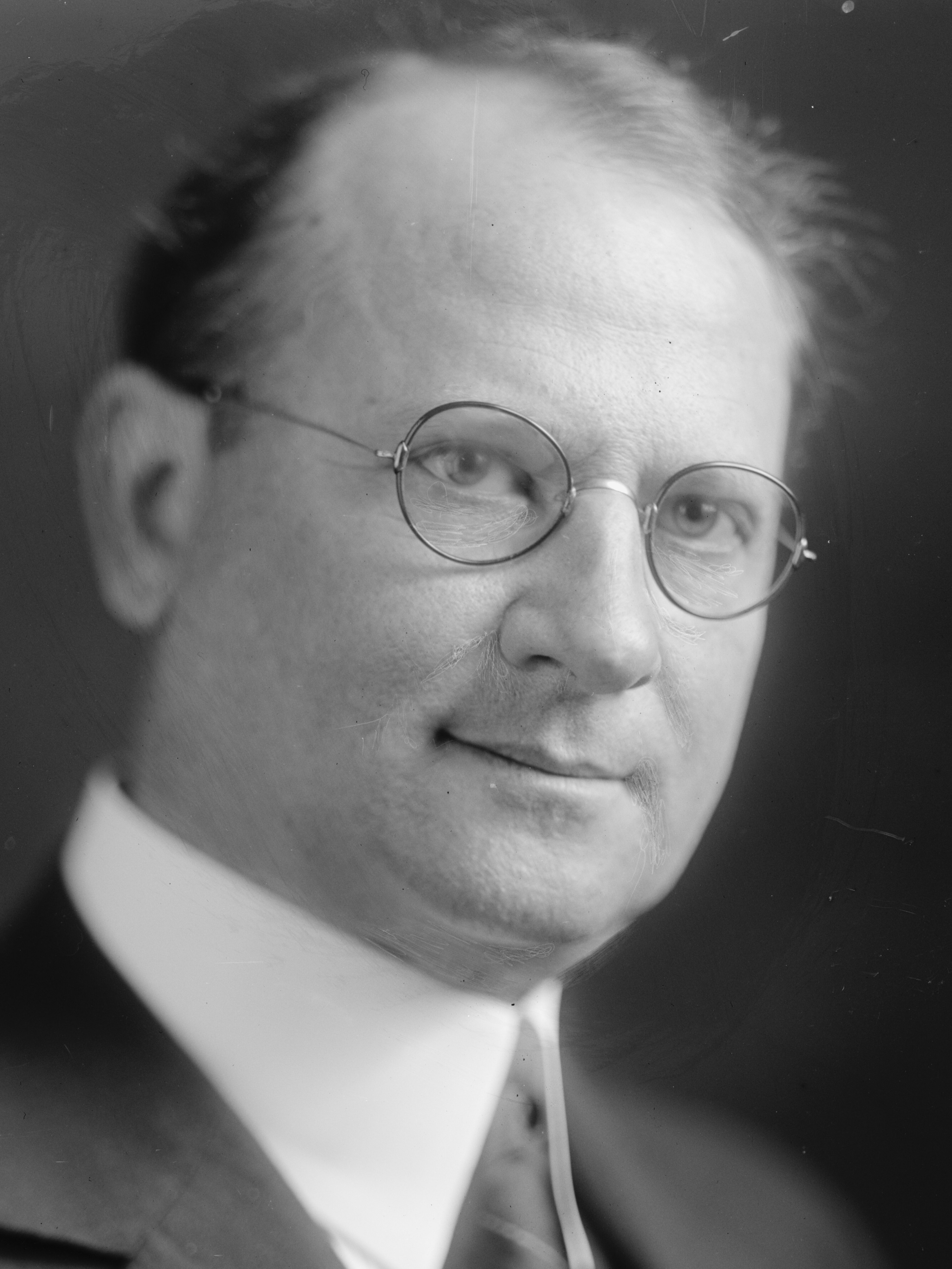

United States Senator from Louisiana
- In office March 4, 1921 – March 3, 1933
- Preceded by: Edward J. Gay
- Succeeded by: John H. Overton

Personal details
- Born: December 4, 1874 Loreauville, Louisiana, U.S.
- Died: November 19, 1934 (aged 59) New Iberia, Louisiana, U.S.
- Resting place: St. Peter's Cemetery, New Iberia, Louisiana, U.S.
- Party: Progressive; Democratic
- Spouse: Marie Patout (m. 1904–1934)
- Children: 6
- Relatives: Robert F. Broussard (brother)
- Education: Tulane University Law School

Edwin Sidney Broussard Sr. (December 4, 1874 – November 19, 1934) was a United States senator from Louisiana, who served for two terms from March 5, 1921, to March 3, 1933.

== Early life ==
Broussard was born in the village of Loreauville, Louisiana on December 4, 1874, to Jean Dorville Broussard, and his wife Anastasie Elizadie Gonsoulin Broussard. He attended public schools in Louisiana. He graduated in 1896 from the Louisiana State University in Baton Rouge. He taught for two years thereafter in the public schools of Iberia and St. Martin parishes.

== Career ==
At the outbreak of the Spanish–American War, Broussard volunteered for the United States Army. A captain in Cuba, in 1898 and 1899, he accompanied the Taft Commission to the Philippine Islands in 1899 and served as an assistant secretary. He returned to the United States in 1900 and graduated the next year from the Tulane University Law School in New Orleans. In 1901, he was admitted to the bar and established his practice in New Iberia, the Iberia Parish seat of government.

Broussard was prosecuting attorney for the Louisiana 19th Judicial District from 1903 to 1908. Between 1914 and 1916, he was affiliated with Theodore Roosevelt's Progressive Party. Broussard opposed the "Old Regulars," the New Orleans Democratic political machine. Broussard ran unsuccessfully in 1916 for lieutenant governor on an intra-party Progressive ticket with gubernatorial candidate John M. Parker, another Roosevelt loyalist.

In 1920, Broussard defeated conservative former Governor Jared Y. Sanders, Sr to win the senate seat vacated two years earlier by his late brother, U. S. Senator Robert F. Broussard. Broussard opposed Prohibition and introduced legislation that sought to exclude beer and wine from the Eighteenth Amendment to the Constitution. He supported the sugar tariff and federal flood control projects important to his state.

Broussard and Sanders both ran again in the 1926 Senate election. The Ku Klux Klan and the Old Regulars rallied against Broussard because of his Roman Catholicism, but with strong support from Louisiana Public Service Commissioner (later Governor) Huey Pierce Long, Jr., Broussard defeated Sanders a second time. In his autobiography, Every Man a King, Long took credit for Broussard's re-election to his second Senate term: "I supported him, and he hasn't a friend in the state who would say that he could have been elected to the Senate in 1926 if it had not been for me."

Broussard supported Long's bid for governor in 1928, but not his run for senator in 1930, which occurred during Long's governorship. Broussard had called upon Long as senator-elect to resign as governor and turn over the office to Lieutenant Governor Paul N. Cyr, a former Long ally turned opponent. Long remained senator-elect for more than a year, however, and did not work well with Broussard as his fellow senator. Broussard even began to praise his former opponent, Sanders, whom Long had helped Broussard to defeat. Long by then considered Broussard "a conservative" in the mold of Sanders and favored the more moderate John Holmes Overton of Alexandria in Rapides Parish as Broussard's Senate replacement. Broussard was denied renomination in the 1932 Democratic primary election as a result of Long's preference; the Long faction was accused of electoral fraud following Overton's victory in the primaries.

After his defeat, Broussard resumed his law practice and tended to the bank and financial affairs in New Iberia, where he died in 1934 and is interred there at St. Peter's Cemetery. He was a member of The Boston Club of New Orleans.

== Personal life ==
On June 5, 1904, Broussard married Marie Clair Patout. The couple had six children.

Party political offices
Preceded by Edward James Gay	Democratic nominee for U.S. Senator from Louisiana (Class 3); 1920, 1926	Succeeded by John H. Overton
U.S. Senate
Preceded by Edward James Gay	U.S. senator (Class 3) from Louisiana; 1921–1933; Served alongside: Joseph E. Ransdell, Huey Pierce Long, Jr.	Succeeded by John H. Overton
