= Sylvan Friedman =

American politician (1908–1979)

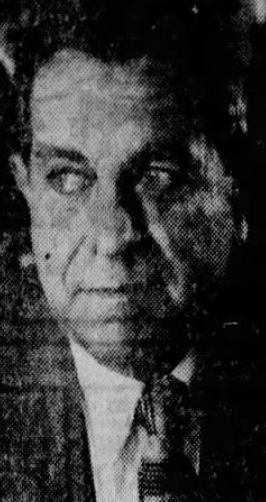
- Friedman in 1959

Member of the Louisiana House of Representatives
- In office 1944–1952

Member of the Louisiana State Senate
- In office 1952–1972
- Preceded by: Lloyd F. Wheat
- Succeeded by: Paul Foshee

Personal details
- Born: Sylvan Nathan Friedman; May 19, 1908 Natchitoches Parish, Louisiana, U.S.
- Died: March 18, 1979 (aged 70) Natchitoches Parish, Louisiana, U.S.
- Party: Democratic
- Children: 1
- Relatives: Leon Friedman (uncle); J. Isaac Friedman (uncle)

Sylvan Nathan Friedman (May 19, 1908 – March 18, 1979) was an American politician. A member of the Democratic Party, he served in the Louisiana House of Representatives from 1944 to 1952 and in the Louisiana State Senate from 1952 to 1972.

== Life and career ==
Friedman was born in Natchitoches Parish, Louisiana, the son of Sam and Mamye Friedman. He was the nephew of Leon Friedman, a Louisiana representative, and J. Isaac Friedman, a Louisiana state senator. He attended and graduated from Natchitoches High School. After graduating, he worked as a farmer.

Friedman served in the Louisiana House of Representatives from 1944 to 1952. After his service in the House, he then served in the Louisiana State Senate from 1952 to 1972.

== Death and legacy ==
Friedman died on March 18, 1979, at the Natchitoches Parish Hospital in Natchitoches Parish, Louisiana, at the age of 70.

In 2006, Freidman was posthumously inducted in the Louisiana Political Museum and Hall of Fame.
