= Natchitoches, Louisiana =

Natchitoches, Louisiana Les Natchitoches (French)
- City
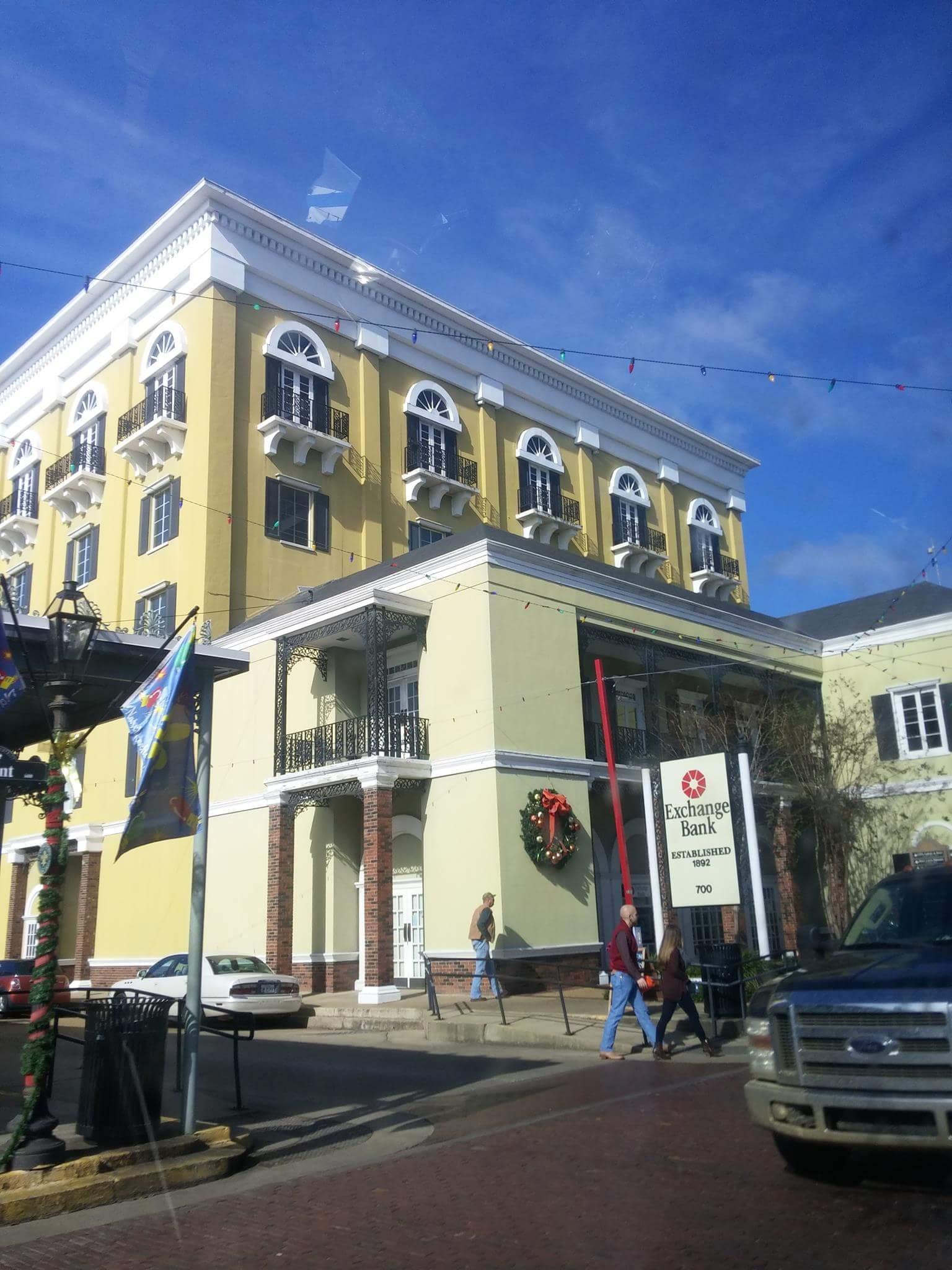
- Exchange Bank in Downtown Natchitoches

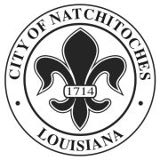
- Seal
- Nickname: The Destination of Travelers since 1714
- Location in Natchitoches Parish, Louisiana

- Location within Louisiana Location within the United States
- Coordinates: 31°44′50″N 93°06′50″W
- Country: United States
- State: Louisiana
- Parish: Natchitoches
- Settled: 1714 (312 years ago)
- Incorporated as a town: February 5, 1819 (207 years ago)
- Founder: Louis Juchereau de St. Denis

Government
  - Type: Mayor–council
  - Body: City Council
  - Mayor: Ronnie Williams, Jr.

Area
  - Total: 26.28 sq mi (68.07 km^{2})
  - Land: 22.69 sq mi (58.77 km^{2})
  - Water: 3.59 sq mi (9.31 km^{2})
- Elevation: 112 ft (34 m)

Population (2020)
  - Total: 18,039
  - Density: 795.0/sq mi (306.97/km^{2})
- Time zone: UTC−6 (CST)
  - Summer (DST): UTC−5 (CDT)
- ZIP code: 71457
- Area code: 318
- Louisiana Highways: link = Louisiana Highway 6
- FIPS code: 22-53545
- GNIS feature ID: 2404352
- Website: City of Natchitoches

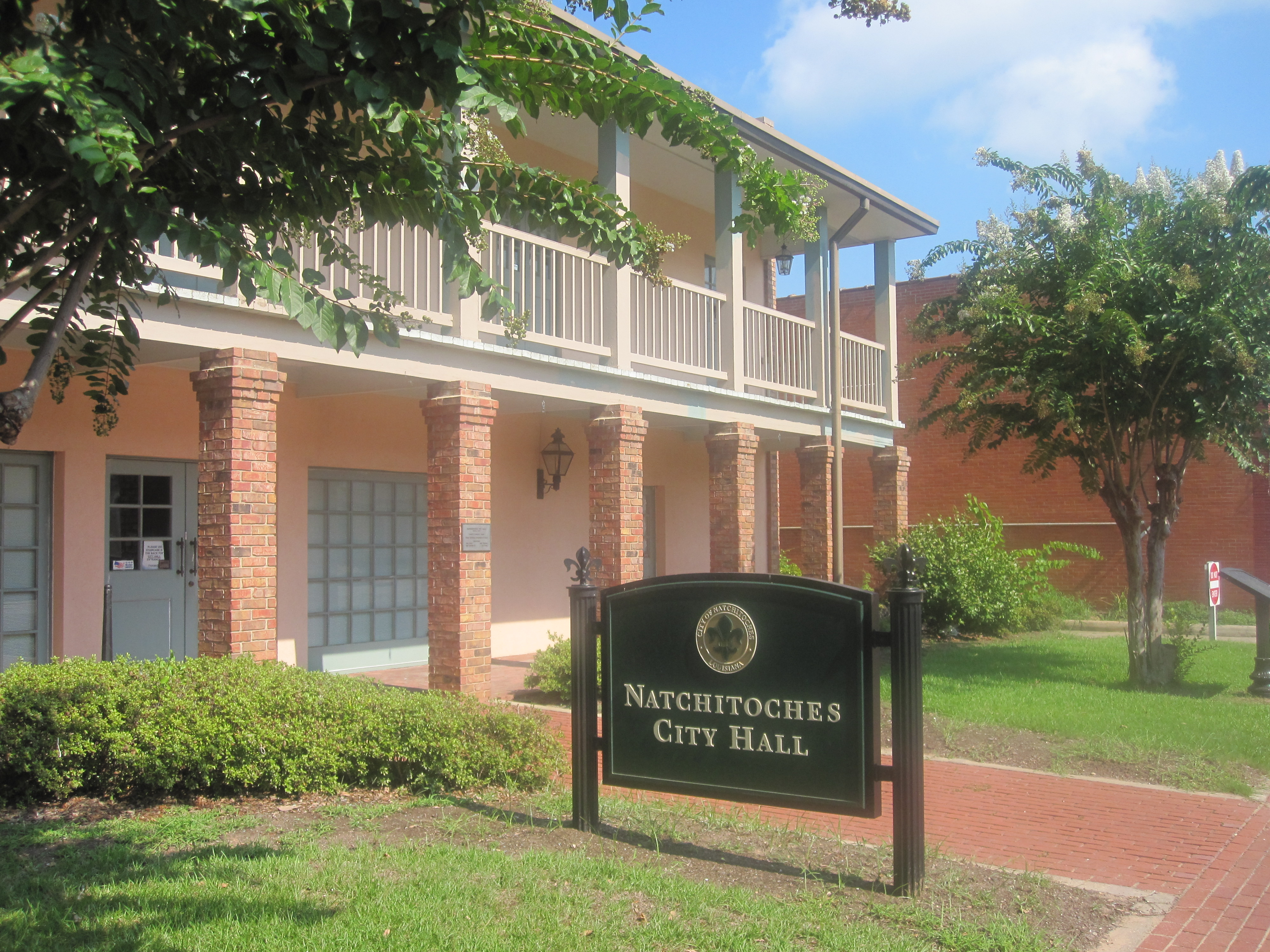
Natchitoches City Hall

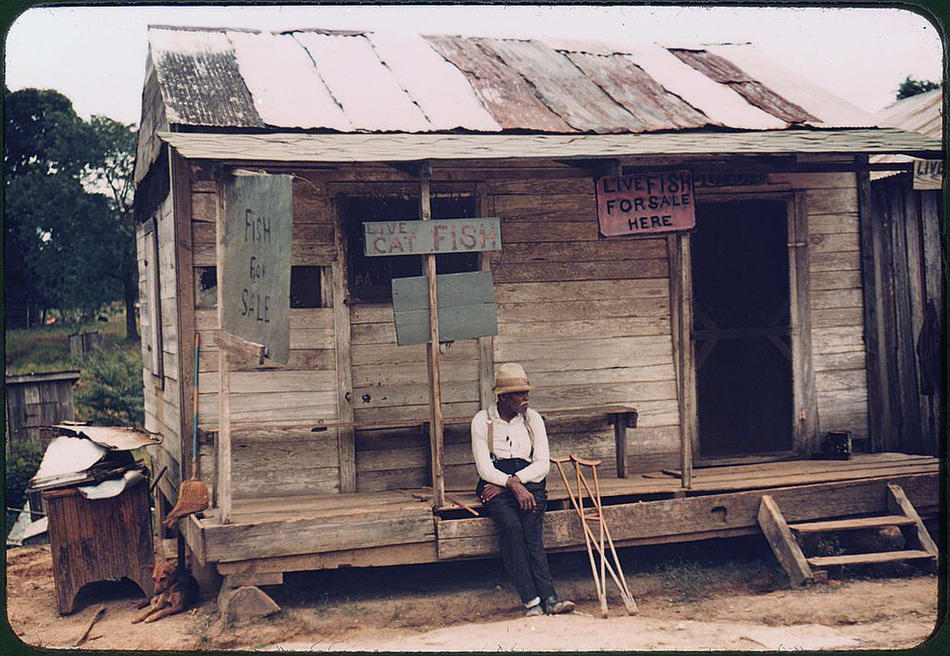
A store with live fish for sale near Natchitoches, 1940. Photo by Marion Post Wolcott.

Natchitoches (/ˈnæk.ə.tɪʃ/, NAK-ə-tish; French: Les Natchitoches, [le nakitɔʃ]) is a city in and the parish seat of Natchitoches Parish, Louisiana, United States. The population was 18,039 at the 2020 census. Established in 1714 by Louis Juchereau de St. Denis as part of French Louisiana, the community was named after the indigenous Natchitoches people. The city was incorporated on February 5, 1819, and is the oldest permanent settlement in the land acquired by the Louisiana Purchase. Natchitoches is home to Northwestern State University of Louisiana. Its sister city is Nacogdoches, Texas.

== History ==
=== Early years ===
Natchitoches was established in 1714 by Canadien explorer Louis Juchereau de St. Denis. It is the oldest permanent European settlement within the borders of the 1803 Louisiana Purchase. Natchitoches was founded as a French outpost on the Red River for trade with Spanish-controlled Mexico; French traders settled there as early as 1699. The post was established near a village of Natchitoches Indians, after whom the city was named. Early settlers were French Catholic immigrants and creoles (originally meaning those ethnic French born in the colony). French creoles acquired lands that were developed in the antebellum years as cotton-producing Magnolia Plantation and Oakland Plantation. Each has been preserved and is designated as a National Historic Landmark.

After the United States' Louisiana Purchase of 1803, migration into the territory increased from the US. Natchitoches grew along with the population in the parish. Initially, the Americans were primarily of English and Scots-Irish ancestry and of Protestant faith. They developed several cotton plantations along the Red River. Numerous enslaved African Americans were brought to the area through the domestic slave trade to work the cotton, and provide all other skills on these plantations, generating the revenues for the wealthy planters before the Civil War.

The United States Government established a federal fur trade factory here in 1805. It was removed to Sulphur Fork, Arkansas in 1818.

In the 1820s and early 1830s, Natchitoches also served as a freight transfer point for cotton shipped from parts of east Texas. Cotton shippers used a land route crossing the Sabine River to Natchitoches, where the freight was transferred to boats, and floated down the Red River to New Orleans.

When the course of the Red River shifted, it bypassed Natchitoches and cut off its lucrative connection with the Mississippi River. A 33-mile (53 km) oxbow lake was left in the river's previous location which became known as Cane River Lake.

=== Civil War ===
During the Civil War, Natchitoches was set on fire by Union soldiers who retreated through the town after their failed attempt to capture Shreveport. Confederate cavalry pursued the fleeing soldiers and arrived in time to help extinguish the flames before the town was destroyed. Alexandria was destroyed by Union troops in 1864, but both Union and Confederate troops were responsible for severely damaging plantations along the river during the war, including Magnolia and Oakland.

Radford Blunt published the Natchitoches Republican. He was also a candidate for the state legislature. William H. Tunnard edited the paper.

=== 20th century ===
As the parish seat, Natchitoches suffered from the decline in agricultural population through the mid-20th century, and grew at a markedly lower rate after 1960. The mechanization of agriculture had reduced the number of workers needed, and many moved to cities for jobs. By the early 1970s, the town's businesses were declining, along with many area farms, and buildings were boarded up.

In the mid-1970s, Mayor Bobby DeBlieux and other preservationists believed that attracting tourists to the area, based on its historic assets of nearly intact plantations and numerous historic buildings, could be a key to attracting visitors, reviving the town, and stimulating new businesses. Over the years, he worked with a variety of landowners and local people to gain support for designating a historic district in the city. He also supported making a national park out of the working area of Magnolia Plantation, which had many surviving outbuildings from the 19th century, and from Oakland Plantation, both downriver in the parish.

By the end of the 20th century, the mile-long French colonial area of downtown, which lies along Cane Lake, was designated as a National Historic District. Many buildings were adapted as antique shops, restaurants and souvenir emporiums. To accommodate tourists, the town had 32 bed-and-breakfast inns, the highest in the state. By 2018, that number had increased to 50.

The plantation country surrounds Cane River Lake. The markedly intact downriver Magnolia and Oakland plantations were designated as National Historic Landmarks, and are part of what has been developed as the Cane River Creole National Historical Park, which was authorized in 1994, with the support of US Senator J. Bennett Johnston. He was a cousin by marriage of Betty Hertzog, the last of the family to live in the great house at Magnolia.

Tours and interpretive programs at both sites continue to attract visitors, especially as they grapple with telling the difficult history of slavery and its aftermath at the plantations. They also cover the contributions of blacks and Creoles of color to the community. In April 2022, the city council added Juneteenth as an official city holiday.

Since the late 20th century, Cane River Lake has served as the spring-break training location for numerous university crew teams, from universities such as the University of St. Thomas, Kansas State University, University of Kansas, Wichita State University, Murray State University, University of Central Oklahoma, and Washington University in St. Louis, as well as Northwestern State University. In the spring of 2018, LSU, Alabama, Texas and Georgia were also represented. Tourists interested in sports often visit in this period to watch the sports teams.

Over the years, the city and parish have improved conditions with a riverbank stabilization project and a water pump project to improve water levels in the lake. This directs water from Hampton Lake into Bayou Possiant, which feeds Cane River Lake.

==== Notable events ====
Natchitoches was the site of a gas pipeline explosion on March 4, 1965, that killed 17 people.

In 1973, singer-songwriter Jim Croce was killed when his plane crashed as it was leaving Natchitoches Regional Airport.

Natchitoches received numerous New Orleans evacuees due to Hurricane Katrina (2005). Many college students from New Orleans were transferred to Northwestern State University to continue their education.

== Geography ==
According to the United States Census Bureau, the city has a total area of 25.1 square miles (65 km^{2}), of which 21.6 square miles (56 km^{2}) are land and 3.6 square miles (9.3 km^{2}) (14.21%) are covered by water.

A 35-mile-long (56 km) lake was formed from a portion of the Red River when it changed course. It is now known as Cane River Lake. The municipal water supply comes from nearby Sibley Lake, a formerly drained wetland dammed in 1962, which also offers fishing and boating.

=== Geology ===
Soils in this area are a combination of leaf mold and red clays, sand, and sediments. The area is part of the Chestnut Salt Dome.

=== Cityscape ===
Though Natchitoches has few multistorey buildings, it has retained much of its historic European-style architecture listed on the National Register of Historic Places as the Natchitoches Historic District. The city is a mesh of wrought iron, stucco, and red brick. The city still has one of the original brick streets (Front Street), which the historical society protects from alterations. The city of Natchitoches recently completed a restoration project to repair the century-old brick street. During this process, workers removed each brick one by one, numbered it, cleaned it, and then replaced it after utilities, drainage, and the foundation were repaired beneath.

=== Climate ===
Climate data for Natchitoches, Louisiana (1991–2020 normals, extremes 1893–present)
Month	Jan	Feb	Mar	Apr	May	Jun	Jul	Aug	Sep	Oct	Nov	Dec	Year
Record high °F (°C)	84 (29)	89 (32)	93 (34)	95 (35)	100 (38)	104 (40)	108 (42)	108 (42)	110 (43)	99 (37)	89 (32)	84 (29)	110 (43)
Mean maximum °F (°C)	76.6 (24.8)	79.6 (26.4)	84.8 (29.3)	88.8 (31.6)	92.9 (33.8)	96.8 (36.0)	99.2 (37.3)	99.9 (37.7)	97.0 (36.1)	91.4 (33.0)	84.0 (28.9)	78.5 (25.8)	100.9 (38.3)
Mean daily maximum °F (°C)	59.8 (15.4)	64.9 (18.3)	72.2 (22.3)	79.3 (26.3)	86.5 (30.3)	92.4 (33.6)	95.3 (35.2)	95.7 (35.4)	90.3 (32.4)	81.1 (27.3)	70.3 (21.3)	62.3 (16.8)	79.2 (26.2)
Daily mean °F (°C)	49.5 (9.7)	53.4 (11.9)	60.6 (15.9)	67.6 (19.8)	75.8 (24.3)	82.6 (28.1)	85.5 (29.7)	85.3 (29.6)	79.5 (26.4)	69.0 (20.6)	58.8 (14.9)	51.7 (10.9)	68.3 (20.2)
Mean daily minimum °F (°C)	39.2 (4.0)	41.9 (5.5)	49.0 (9.4)	56.0 (13.3)	65.1 (18.4)	72.9 (22.7)	75.8 (24.3)	74.9 (23.8)	68.7 (20.4)	56.9 (13.8)	47.3 (8.5)	41.1 (5.1)	57.4 (14.1)
Mean minimum °F (°C)	23.4 (−4.8)	28.0 (−2.2)	32.3 (0.2)	40.2 (4.6)	50.9 (10.5)	62.9 (17.2)	68.4 (20.2)	66.7 (19.3)	54.8 (12.7)	40.3 (4.6)	30.8 (−0.7)	26.6 (−3.0)	21.8 (−5.7)
Record low °F (°C)	3 (−16)	3 (−16)	21 (−6)	30 (−1)	39 (4)	43 (6)	55 (13)	52 (11)	40 (4)	26 (−3)	19 (−7)	5 (−15)	3 (−16)
Average precipitation inches (mm)	5.08 (129)	4.48 (114)	5.76 (146)	5.66 (144)	4.16 (106)	5.22 (133)	3.51 (89)	3.27 (83)	3.90 (99)	4.52 (115)	4.76 (121)	5.61 (142)	55.93 (1,421)
Average precipitation days (≥ 0.01 in)	10.2	8.8	9.1	6.5	8.2	9.4	8.6	6.5	6.9	7.1	7.4	9.8	98.5
Average snowy days (≥ 0.1 in)	0.1	0.0	0.0	0.0	0.0	0.0	0.0	0.0	0.0	0.0	0.0	0.1	0.2
Source: NOAA

Natchitoches lies in a boundary region that separates the plains of Texas from the consistently humid Gulf Coast. Summers are hot and humid. Winters in Natchitoches are relatively mild, with measurable snowfall once every 5–10 years. Natchitoches averages 54.93 inches (1,395 mm) of rain per year. The city is in an area that frequently experiences severe thunderstorms, hail, damaging winds, and tornadoes.

== Demographics ==
Historical population
Census	Pop.	Note	%±
1820	986		—
1830	1,405		42.5%
1850	1,261		—
1870	1,401		—
1880	2,785		98.8%
1890	1,820		−34.6%
1900	2,388		31.2%
1910	2,532		6.0%
1920	3,388		33.8%
1930	4,547		34.2%
1940	6,812		49.8%
1950	9,914		45.5%
1960	13,924		40.4%
1970	15,974		14.7%
1980	16,664		4.3%
1990	16,609		−0.3%
2000	17,865		7.6%
2010	18,323		2.6%
2020	18,039		−1.5%
2025 (est.)	17,146	▼	−5.0%
U.S. Decennial Census

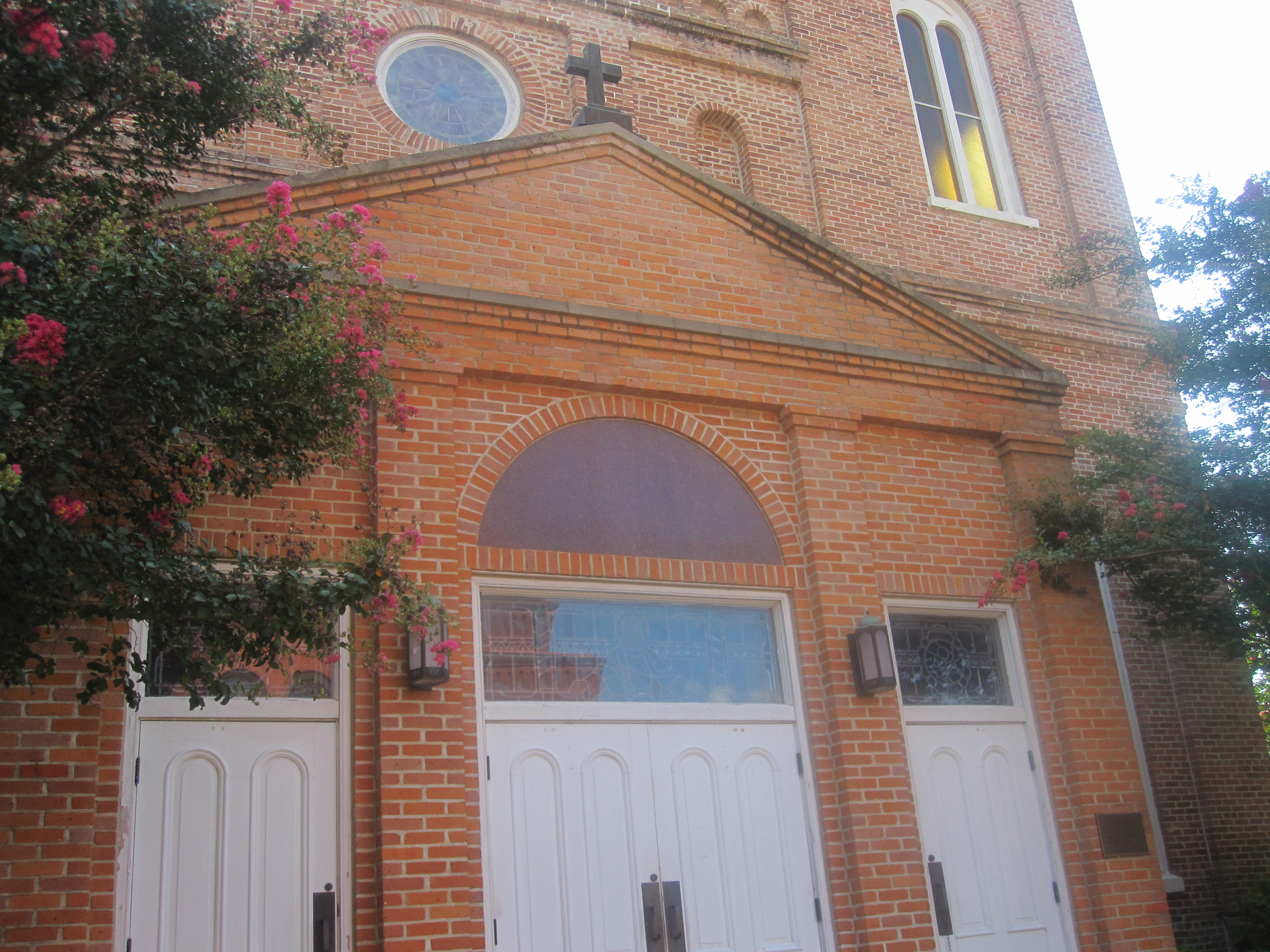
The Basilica of the Immaculate Conception in Natchitoches is located across from the old Courthouse Museum.

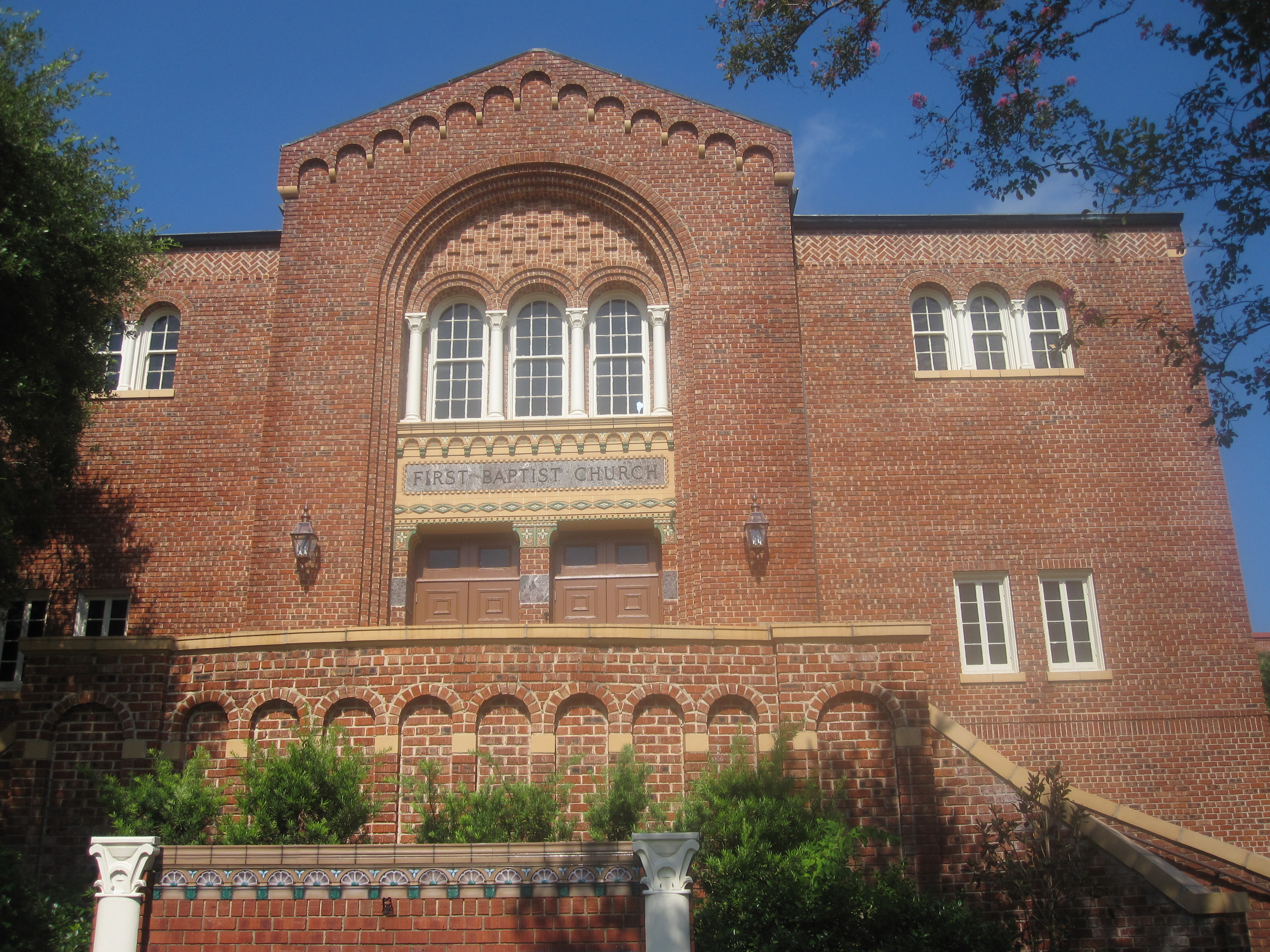
Though founded by Roman Catholics, Natchitoches has a large First Baptist Church located in the downtown district.

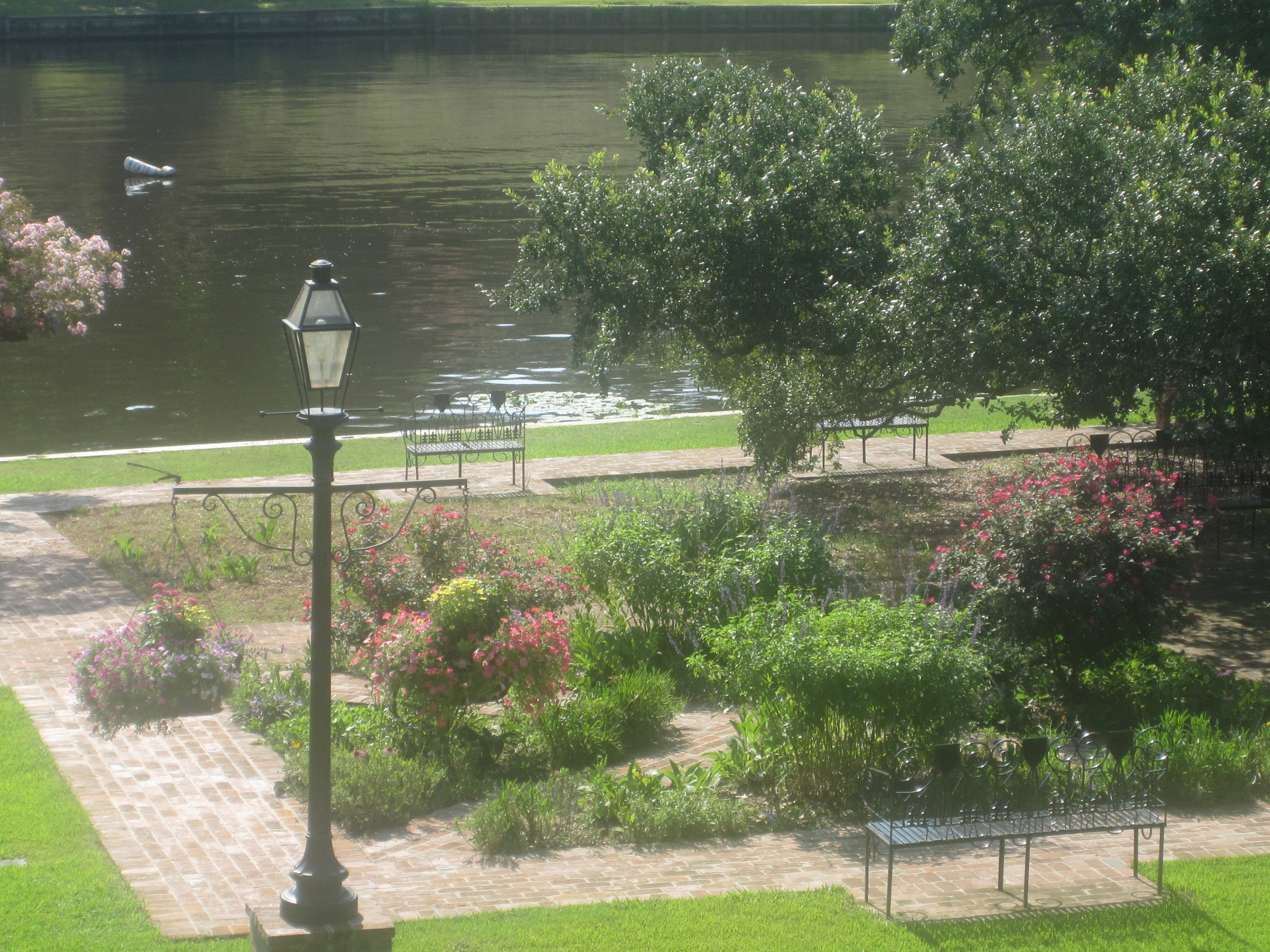
Riverwalk of Cane River in downtown Natchitoches, as photographed from Front Street

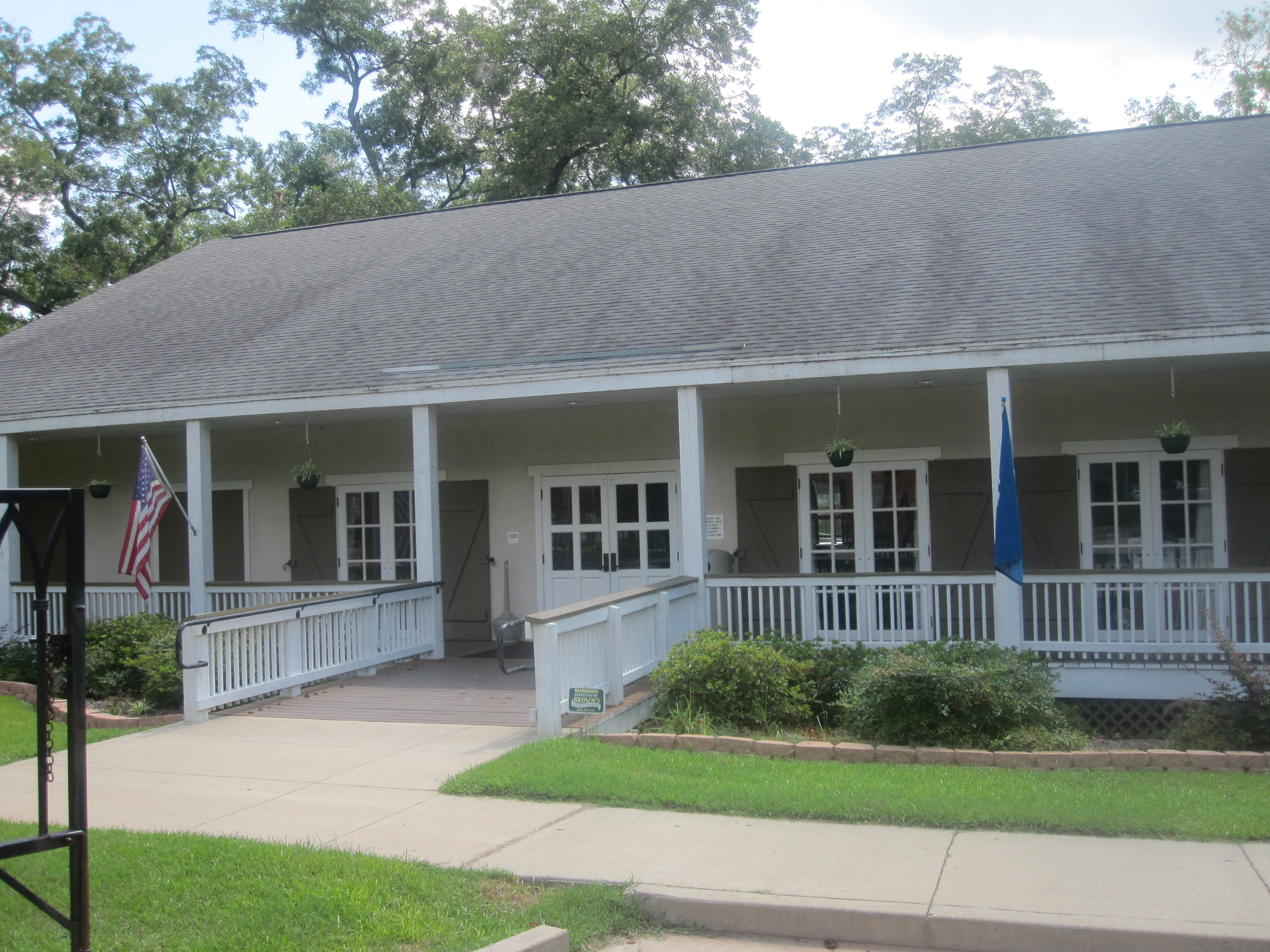
Reconstructed Fort Saint Jean Baptiste museum on Jefferson Street in Natchitoches

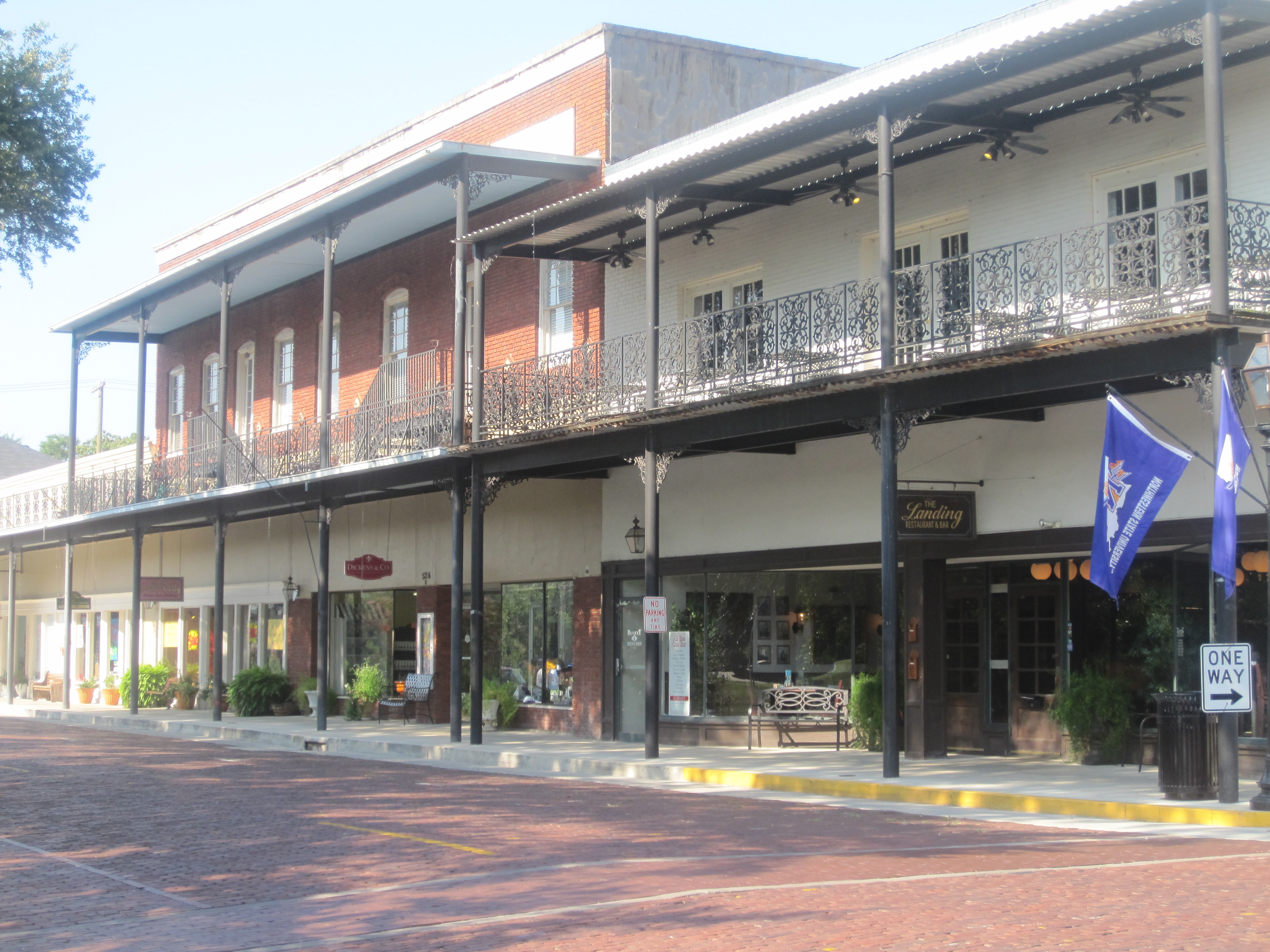
Downtown Natchitoches, with historic buildings, stores, and shops, maintains brick streets.

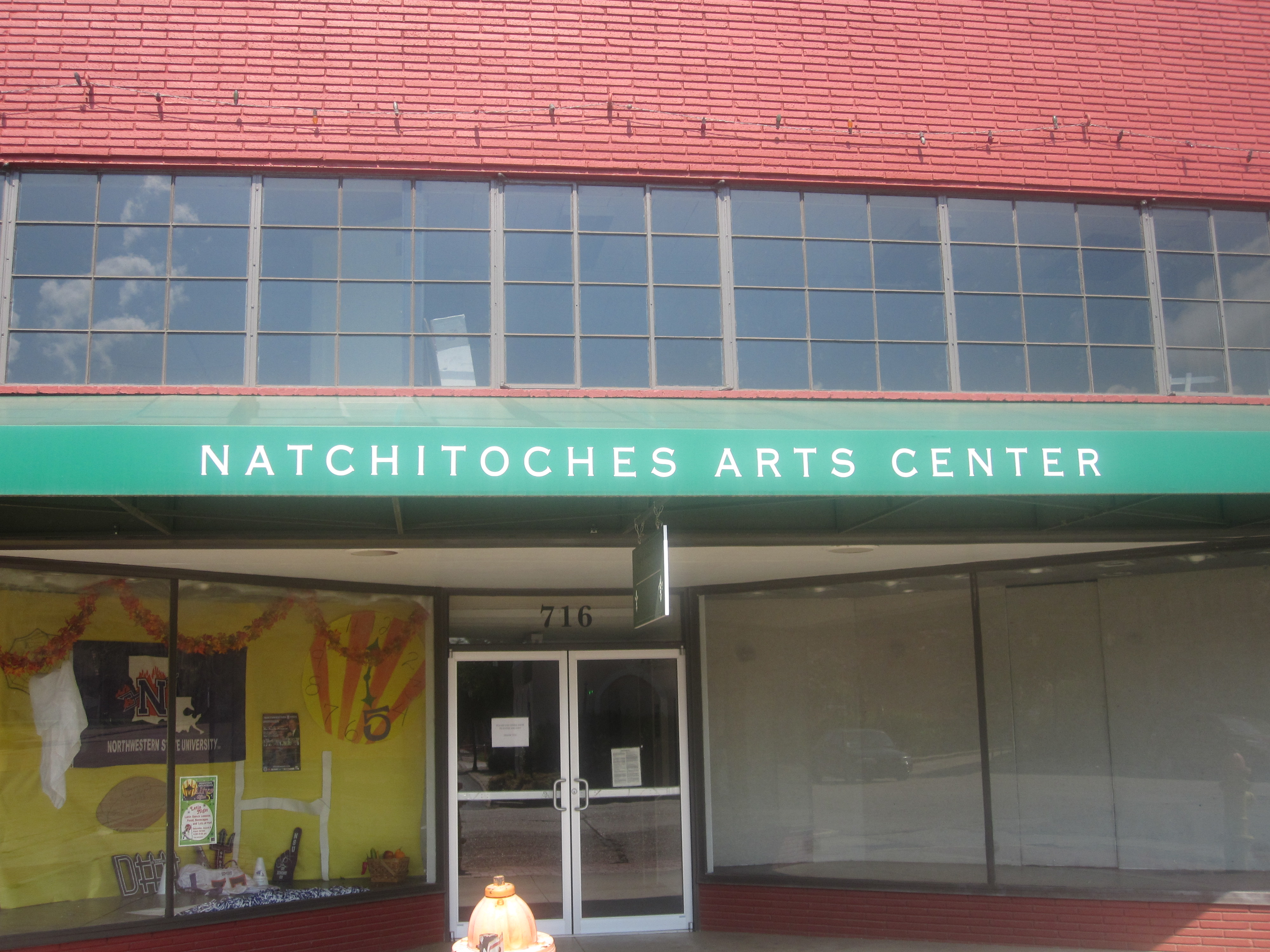
Natchitoches Arts Center on Second Street near City Hall

=== Racial and ethnic composition ===
Natchitoches city, Louisiana – racial and ethnic composition Note: the US Census treats Hispanic/Latino as an ethnic category. This table excludes Latinos from the racial categories and assigns them to a separate category. Hispanics/Latinos may be of any race.
Race / ethnicity (NH = Non-Hispanic)	Pop 2000	Pop 2010	Pop 2020	% 2000	% 2010	% 2020
White alone (NH)	7,724	6,666	6,370	43.24%	36.38%	35.31%
Black or African American alone (NH)	9,399	10,807	9,892	52.61%	58.98%	54.84%
Native American or Alaska Native alone (NH)	116	83	64	0.65%	0.45%	0.35%
Asian alone (NH)	146	103	122	0.82%	0.56%	0.68%
Native Hawaiian or Pacific Islander alone (NH)	2	2	10	0.01%	0.01%	0.06%
Other race alone (NH)	65	70	87	0.36%	0.38%	0.48%
Mixed-race or multiracial (NH)	181	283	584	1.01%	1.54%	3.24%
Hispanic or Latino (any race)	232	309	910	1.30%	1.69%	5.04%
Total	17,865	18,323	18,039	100.00%	100.00%	100.00%

=== 2020 census ===
As of the 2020 census, Natchitoches had a population of 18,039. The median age was 32.1 years. 21.4% of residents were under the age of 18 and 14.9% of residents were 65 years of age or older. For every 100 females there were 88.9 males, and for every 100 females age 18 and over there were 85.3 males age 18 and over.

There were 7,083 households in Natchitoches, including 2,773 families; 28.0% had children under the age of 18 living in them. Of all households, 24.7% were married-couple households, 21.7% were households with a male householder and no spouse or partner present, and 47.3% were households with a female householder and no spouse or partner present. About 39.5% of all households were made up of individuals and 13.3% had someone living alone who was 65 years of age or older.

There were 8,432 housing units, of which 16.0% were vacant. The homeowner vacancy rate was 2.3% and the rental vacancy rate was 14.0%.

95.7% of residents lived in urban areas, while 4.3% lived in rural areas.

Racial composition as of the 2020 census
Race	Number	Percent
White	6,690	37.1%
Black or African American	9,956	55.2%
American Indian and Alaska Native	76	0.4%
Asian	125	0.7%
Native Hawaiian and Other Pacific Islander	11	0.1%
Some other race	428	2.4%
Two or more races	753	4.2%
Hispanic or Latino (of any race)	910	5.0%

=== 2010 census ===
As of the 2010 census, 18,323 people, 6,705 households, and 3,631 families were residing in the city. The population density was 828.5 inhabitants per square mile (319.9/km^{2}). The 7,906 housing units averaged 312.2 units per square mile (120.5 units/km^{2}). The racial makeup of the city was 59.0% African American, 36.4% White, 0.5% Native American, 0.6% Asian, 0.42% from other races, and 1.5% from two or more races. Hispanics or Latinos of any race was 1.7% of the population.

Of the 6,113 households, 30.4% had children under the age of 18 living with them, 34.3% were married couples living together, 21.5% had a female householder with no husband present, and 40.6% were not families. About 30.8% of all households were made up of individuals, and 11.3% had someone living alone who was 65 years of age or older. The average household size was 2.50, and the average family size was 3.18.

In the city, the age distribution was 23.6% under the age of 18, 27.2% from 18 to 24, 21.8% from 25 to 44, 16.0% from 45 to 64, and 11.4% who were 65 years of age or older. The median age was 24.5 years. For every 100 females, there were 85.0 males. For every 100 females age 18 and over, there were 80.2 males.

The median income for a household in the city was $23,261, and for a family was $30,396. Males had a median income of $28,601 versus $17,859 for females. The per capita income for the city was $12,642. About 26.7% of families and 34.8% of the population were below the poverty line, including 45.0% of those under age 18 and 19.2% of those aged 65 or over.

== Native American tribes ==
- Adai Caddo Indians of Louisiana
- Natchitoches people
- Caddo

== Economy ==
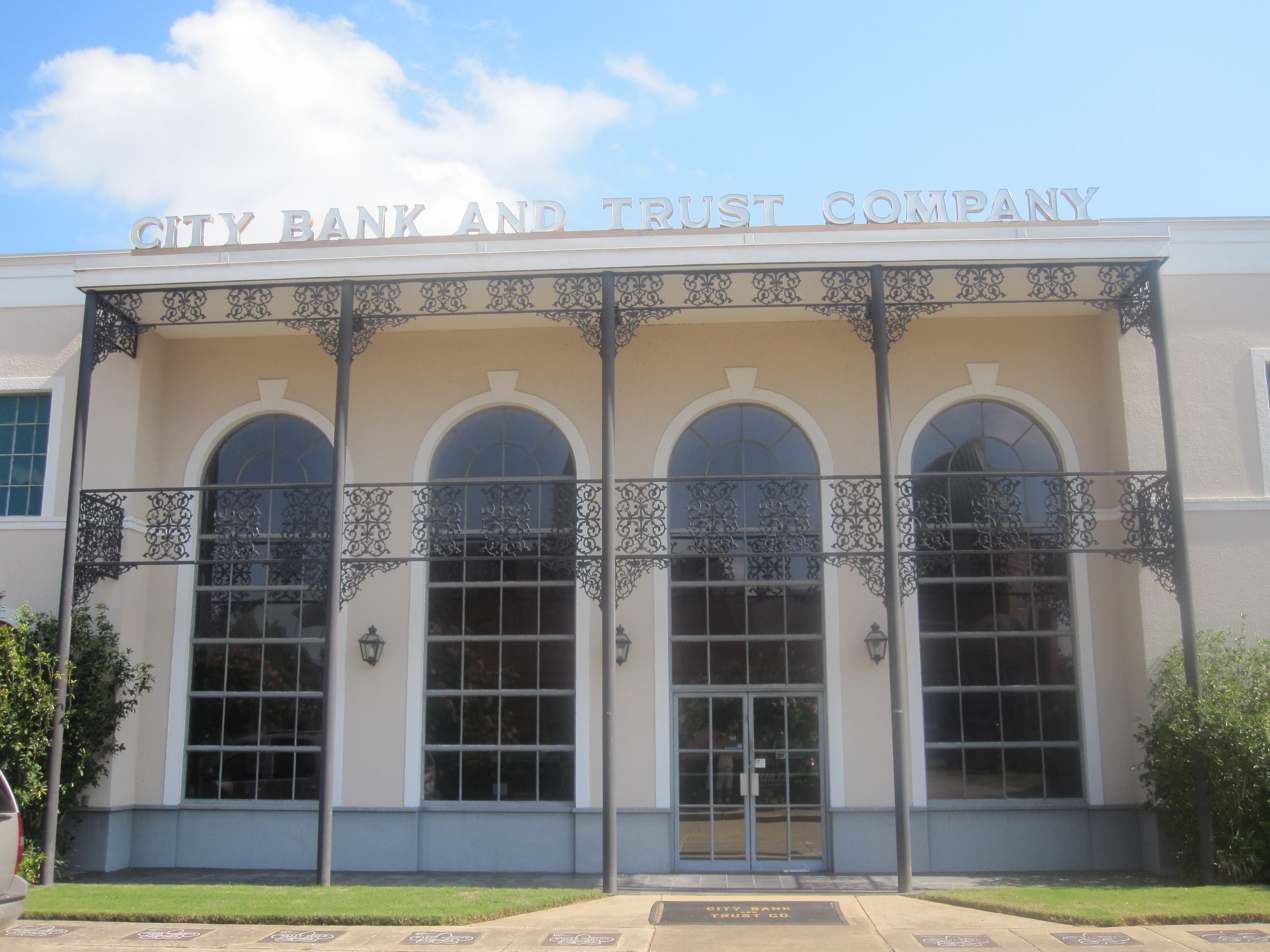
City Bank and Trust Company is one of several financial institutions in downtown Natchitoches.

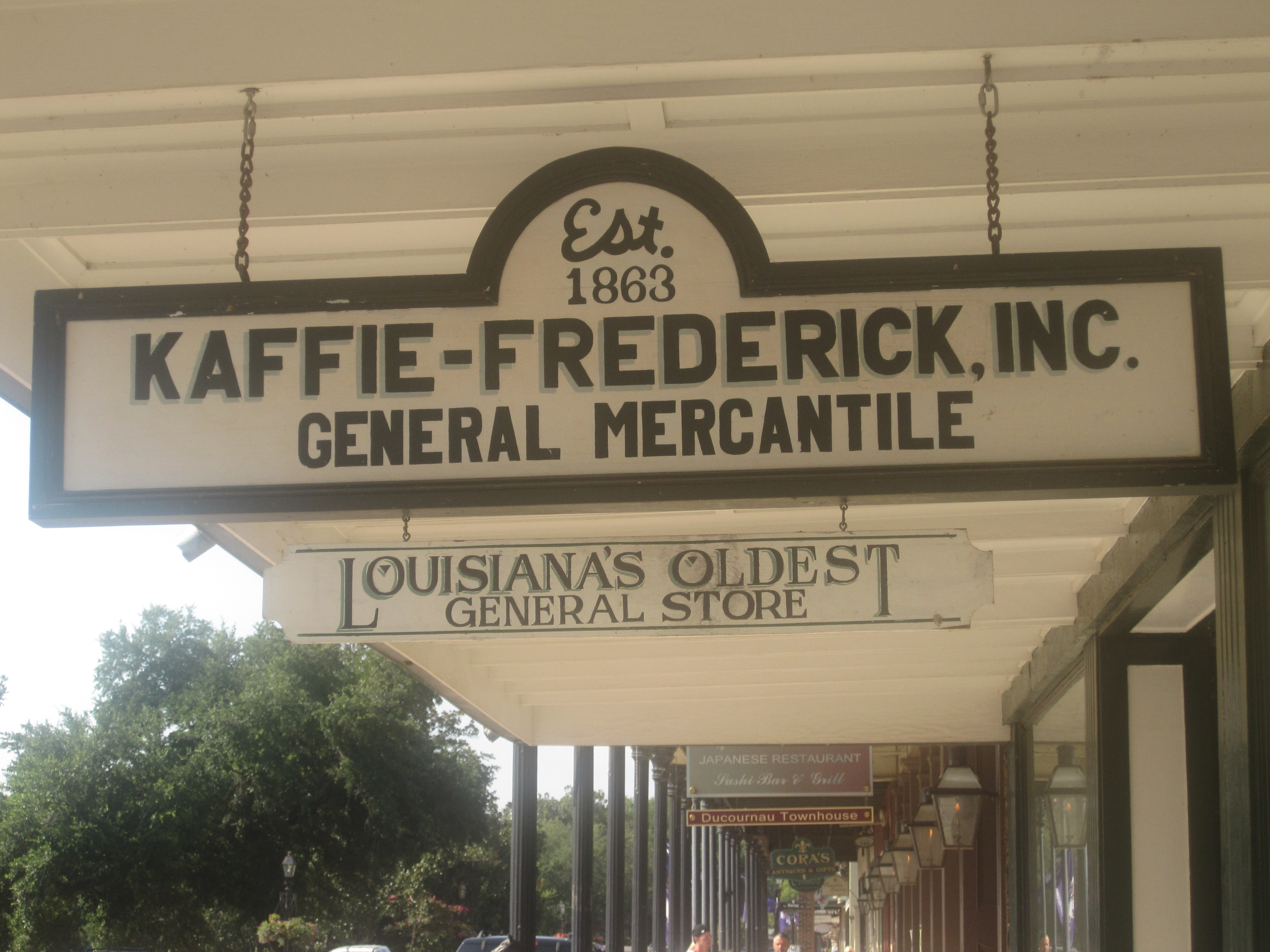
Kaffie-Frederick, Inc., is the oldest general store in Louisiana.

Following continued population decline in the area, in part due to mechanization of agriculture, by the 1970s, Natchitoches had suffered an economic downturn that resulted in a 65% vacancy in the commercial district. Because of efforts to revitalize the city and emphasize its unique historic assets, as described above, vacancy is now about 1%.

The Port of Natchitoches—a river port on the Red River—is located off the eastbound part of U.S. Route 84, just outside Natchitoches. The port exports lumber from yards onsite, as forestry is a major industry in the area, as well.

Natchitoches Regional Airport serves cities (via FBO) such as Baton Rouge, New Orleans, Dallas, Houston, Little Rock, Monroe, and Shreveport. It is adjacent to Northwestern State University; together, they offer flight training. The airport is under renovation to become one of the country's most advanced non-towered airports.

The Natchitoches National Fish Hatchery is based here. They handle over six species of fish and other wildlife. The parish attracts numerous sports fishermen during the seasons.

The Natchitoches Christmas Festival is a well-known celebration of the holidays for locals. The festival is held on the river.

Since completion of Interstate 49, many business have either moved or have been built outside the city's central area. Gas stations and hotels have developed in this area and serve many of the Natchitoches Christmas Festival visitors.

In 1998, Natchitoches was named one of the top six places in the United States to retire by Kiplinger's Personal Finance Magazine.

=== Tourism ===
The Cane River National Heritage Area is a 116,000-acre (470 km^{2}) area which includes many sites such as Oakland Plantation, Melrose Plantation, Badin-Roque House, Magnolia Plantation, Kate Chopin House, Cherokee Plantation, Cane River Heritage Scenic Byway, Fort St. Jean Baptiste State Historic Site, National Historic Landmark District (Old Courthouse Museum, Bishop Martin Museum, Landmarks in Time Exhibit), and Los Adaes State Historic Site. Because of this richness of culture, the area is one of the destinations on the Louisiana African American Heritage Trail newly designated by the state.

Natchitoches, a popular tourism area of the state, is equipped to serve visitors with 11 national chain hotels, and 27 bed-and-breakfast inns.

Natchitoches attracts over one million visitors annually. The city is known as a retiree-friendly city. In 2006, Natchitoches was awarded the Great American Main Street Award for the effort the community has put into revitalizing and restoring much of the historic district.

The city's tourism center is the downtown river walk. This includes Front Street, which becomes Jefferson at the Texas Street light. Front Street is the jewel of the city. It overlooks the river walk and is bordered by an assortment of shops and boutiques. The city has identified this area as its historical district. The Historical Society maintains the area through regulations on changes and restorations. Natchitoches has a mini "Walk of Fame" located in the historical district of the city.

The city recently built a small convention center located on Second Street, which holds many city events.

At Bayou Pierre Alligator Park, tourists may feed the alligators, dine, and shop. The park teaches children to respect nature and to conserve its many habitats. Natchitoches is home to a branch of the Kisatchie National Forest, a designation promoted by naturalist Caroline Dormon to preserve regional natural wonders.

Opened in December 2005, the Natchitoches Events Center is in the Natchitoches National Historic Landmark District. Located at 750 Second Street, the facility has a 40,000-square-foot (3,700 m^{2}) meeting facility, a 15,000-square-foot (1,400 m^{2}) exhibit hall with three meeting rooms, a board room, and a full-sized catering kitchen.

=== National Guard ===
A Troop 2-108TH CAV is headquartered behind the local college and the airport. This unit has been deployed twice to Iraq, first as part of the 1-156TH Armor Battalion in 2004–2005, and then as part of the 2-108TH CAV SQDN in 2010. Both times, this company-sized unit deployed with the 256th Infantry Brigade.

== Arts and culture ==
The Natchitoches meat pie is one of the official state foods of Louisiana. It is known as a regional delicacy of North Louisiana.

Natchitoches has long been known for its popular Christmas Festival of Lights, which is held the first Saturday in December. The lights continue to brighten the Cane River until after New Year's Day. In 2019, the festival celebrated its 93rd year.

== Education ==
=== Colleges and universities ===
- Northwestern State University
- Louisiana Scholars' College
- Louisiana Technical College

The Northwestern Campus is also home to the Louisiana Scholars' College, the state's designated honors college for the study of the liberal arts and sciences. As a part of its effort to become a global campus, NSU is a sister university with many universities in Asia.

Natchitoches Parish is in the service area of Bossier Parish Community College.

=== Primary and secondary schools ===
==== Public schools ====
Natchitoches Parish School Board operates many public schools. They include:

- East Natchitoches Elementary/Middle School
- George L. Parks Elementary
- L.P. Vaughn Elementary
- M.R. Weaver Elementary
- NSU Elementary/Middle Laboratory School
- Natchitoches Junior High—Frankie Ray Jackson School
- Natchitoches Magnet School
- Natchitoches Central High School

The city is also home to the Louisiana School for Math, Science, and the Arts, a public residential honors high school.

==== Private schools ====
St. Mary's High School is in Natchitoches.

== Media ==
=== Newspapers ===
- Natchitoches Times
- Natchitoches Parish Journal

=== Radio ===
Natchitoches is the principal city of the Natchitoches media market for radio.

=== Television ===
Natchitoches is part of the Shreveport media market for television.

== Infrastructure ==
=== Health care ===
Natchitoches Regional Medical Center is a 78-bed facility that includes 45 medical/surgical beds and a 112-bed skilled nursing home. Rehabilitation treatment is at the PRISM Center for physical, occupational and speech therapy, sports medicine, industrial medicine, wound care and more. NRMC was established in 1956.

=== Utility ===
City of Natchitoches Utility is a city-owned utility company that includes electric power, street lighting, water distribution, and sewer collection.

== Notable people ==
- Jack Berly (1903–1977), Major League Baseball pitcher
- Curtis Boozman (1898–1979), served two terms in the Louisiana House of Representatives
- Leopold Caspari, businessman, and member of both houses of the Louisiana State Legislature
- Joanna Cassidy, Golden Globe award-winning actress
- Monnie T. Cheves, NSU professor; member of the Louisiana House 1952–1960
- Kate Chopin, short story writer and novelist
- Charles Milton Cunningham (1877–1936), attorney and member of the Louisiana State Senate
- Milton Joseph Cunningham (1842–1916), attorney, representative and senator from Natchitoches Parish
- W. Peyton Cunningham (1901–1971), attorney and member of the Louisiana House
- W. T. Cunningham (1871–1952), attorney, state judge, state representative
- George Doherty, former football player
- Caroline Dormon, naturalist and preservationist
- Steve Dowden, former football player
- David Dumars, player of gridiron football
- Joe Dumars, NBA championship-winning player
- Joseph Barton Elam, member of the United States House of Representatives
- Medford Bryan Evans (1907–1989), former professor and political writer
- Dan Flores (born 1948), historian at the University of Montana
- Paul Foshee (1932–2020), member of the Louisiana House of Representatives
- Grits Gresham (1922–2008), sportsman, and host of The American Sportsman
- Robert Harling, playwright and Hollywood screenwriter (born 1951)
- Bobby Hebert, football quarterback; New Orleans Saints
- Robert Hilburn (born 1939), biographer for Los Angeles Times
- George W. Jack, judge from 1917 until his death in 1924
- Andrew R. Johnson (1856–1933), state senator and mayor
- Marques Johnson, basketball player with UCLA and others
- Pat Listach, MLB player for the Milwaukee Brewers and Houston Astros
- Jimmy D. Long, former Democratic member of the Louisiana House of Representatives
- Vern Roberson (born 1952), NFL player
- Henry Hopkins Sibley (1816–1886), Confederate general
- Ray Tarver (1921–1972), dentist and politician
- Charlie Tolar (1937–2003), football player for Houston Oilers
- Trini Triggs (born 1965), country music singer born and reared in Natchitoches
- A. L. Williams (born 1934), NSU and Louisiana Tech football coach
- J. Robert Wooley (born 1953), Louisiana insurance commissioner

== In popular culture ==
Multiple movies have been filmed here, including:

- The Horse Soldiers (1959), starring William Holden and John Wayne
- Cane River (1982), filmed by Horace B. Jenkins in New Orleans and Natchitoches Parish
- Steel Magnolias (1989), starring Julia Roberts, Sally Field, Daryl Hannah, Shirley MacLaine, Dolly Parton, and Olympia Dukakis
- The Man in the Moon (1991), starring Reese Witherspoon, Jason London, Sam Waterston, and Tess Harper
- 12 Years a Slave (2013), four historic antebellum plantations were used in the film: Felicity, Magnolia, Bocage, and Destrehan. Magnolia, a plantation in Natchitoches, Louisiana, is just a few miles from one of the historic sites where Northup was held. "To know that we were right there in the place where these things occurred was so powerful and emotional," said actor Chiwetel Ejiofor. "That feeling of dancing with ghosts—it's palpable."
