= Paul Foshee =

American politician (1932–2020)

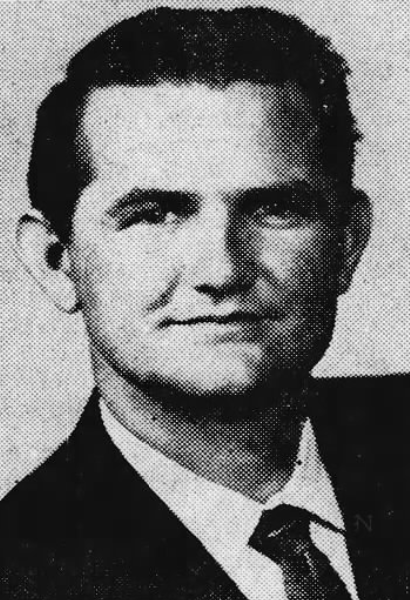
- Foshee in 1960

Member of the Louisiana House of Representatives
- In office 1960–1964

Member of the Louisiana State Senate
- In office 1972–1976
- Preceded by: Sylvan Friedman
- Succeeded by: Donald G. Kelly

Personal details
- Born: Paul Lee Foshee; November 12, 1932 Natchitoches, Louisiana, U.S.
- Died: November 8, 2020 (aged 87) Natchitoches, Louisiana, U.S.
- Party: Democratic
- Children: 4
- Education: Northwestern State University

Paul Lee Foshee (November 12, 1932 – November 8, 2020) was an American politician. A member of the Democratic Party, he served in the Louisiana House of Representatives from 1960 to 1964 and in the Louisiana State Senate from 1972 to 1976.

== Life and career ==
Foshee was born in Natchitoches, Louisiana, the son of Mamie Lee Smith and George Washington Foshee. He attended Natchitoches Central High School, graduating in 1950. After graduating, he attended Northwestern State University, earning his bachelor's degree in business in 1961.

Foshee served in the Louisiana House of Representatives from 1960 to 1964. After his service in the House, he then served in the Louisiana State Senate from 1972 to 1976.

== Death ==
Foshee died on November 8, 2020, at his home in Natchitoches, Louisiana, at the age of 87.
