= Leopold Caspari =

American politician (1830–1915)

Louisiana State Senator for principally Natchitoches Parish
- In office 1900–1908
- Preceded by: G. L. Trichel; A. T. Liverman
- Succeeded by: B.W. Marston
- In office 1909–1914
- Preceded by: B. W. Marston
- Succeeded by: Charles Milton Cunningham

Louisiana State Representative from Natchitoches Parish
- In office 1884–1892
- Preceded by: James H. Cosgrove; R. E. Jackson
- Succeeded by: M.R. Joyner; T.L. Mathis

Personal details
- Born: July 28, 1830 Lauterbourg, France
- Died: March 11, 1915 (aged 84) Natchitoches, Natchitoches Parish, Louisiana, US
- Resting place: American Cemetery in Natchitoches
- Party: Democratic
- Occupation: Businessman; banker

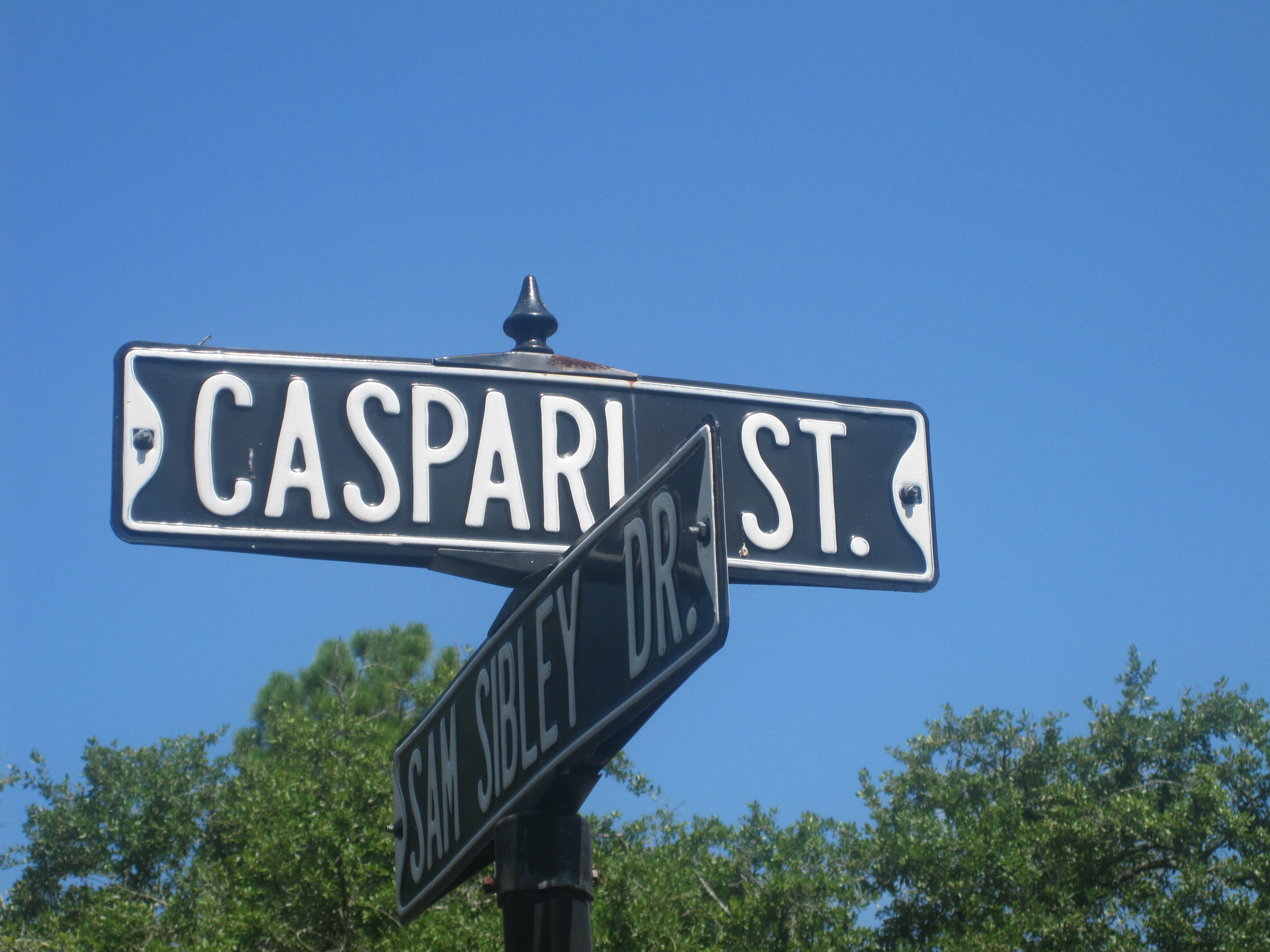
Caspari Street sign at intersection with Sam Sibley Drive in Natchitoches, Louisiana

Leopold Caspari (July 28, 1830 – March 11, 1915) was a Louisiana businessman and politician who served in the Louisiana House of Representatives from 1884 to 1892, where he advocated the establishment of Northwestern State University.

Born in Lauterbourg, northeastern France, he came to Louisiana after the Revolution of 1848, and served in the Confederate States of America during the Civil War, gaining the rank of captain. (Note: "Dictionary C". Louisiana Historical Association.)

Political offices
Preceded by James H. Cosgrove; R. E. Jackson	Louisiana State Representative from Natchitoches Parish; 1884–1892	Succeeded by M. R. Joyner; T. L. Mathis
Preceded by G. L. Trichel; A. T. Liverman	Louisiana State Senator from principally Natchitoches Parish; 1900–1908	Succeeded by B. W. Marston
Preceded by B.W. Marston	Louisiana State Senator from principally Natchitoches Parish; 1909–1914	Succeeded by Charles Milton Cunningham
