= W. T. Cunningham =

American judge and politician

- Cunningham in 1945

Member of the Louisiana House of Representatives
- In office 1908–1912

District Judge of the Eleventh Judicial District Court of Louisiana
- In office 1912–1920

Personal details
- Born: William Tharpe Cunningham; August 21, 1871 Natchitoches, Louisiana, U.S.
- Died: February 7, 1952 (aged 80) Natchitoches, Louisiana, U.S.
- Party: Democratic
- Parent: Milton Joseph Cunningham (father)
- Relatives: Charles Milton Cunningham (brother); W. Peyton Cunningham (nephew)
- Education: Louisiana State Normal College; Tulane University
- Occupation: Judge

William Tharpe Cunningham (August 21, 1871 – February 7, 1952) was an American judge and politician. A member of the Democratic Party, he served in the Louisiana House of Representatives from 1908 to 1912 and as district judge of the Eleventh Judicial District Court of Louisiana from 1912 to 1920.

== Life and career ==
Cunningham was born in Natchitoches, Louisiana, the son of Milton Joseph Cunningham, an attorney general of Louisiana, and Thalia Allen Tharp. He was the brother of Charles Milton Cunningham, a Louisiana state senator, and was the uncle of W. Peyton Cunningham, a Louisiana representative. He attended and graduated from Louisiana State Normal College. After graduating, he attended Tulane University, earning his degree in law.

Cunningham served in the Louisiana House of Representatives from 1908 to 1912. After his service in the House, he served as district judge of the Eleventh Judicial District Court of Louisiana from 1912 to 1920.

== Death ==
Cunningham died on February 7, 1952, at the Natchitoches Hospital in Natchitoches, Louisiana, at the age of 80.
