= Charles Milton Cunningham =

American politician (1877–1936)

Louisiana State Senator for Natchitoches Parish
- In office 1915–1922
- Preceded by: Leopold Caspari
- Succeeded by: J. Isaac Friedman

Personal details
- Born: April 2, 1877 New Orleans; Louisiana, USA
- Died: May 17, 1936 (aged 59) Natchitoches, Natchitoches Parish, Louisiana
- Resting place: Catholic Cemetery in Natchitoches
- Party: Democratic
- Spouse: Alicia Evelena Payne Cunningham (married 1898-1936, his death)
- Relations: W. T. Cunningham (brother) John William Payne (brother-in-law) Mildred Methvin (great-granddaughter)
- Children: Charles Milton Cunningham, Jr. John Hamilton Cunningham; W. Peyton Cunningham; Charles Murray Cunningham; Joseph Blanchard Cunningham; Mary Cunningham Miller Sister Elisabeth Cunningham
- Parent: Milton Joseph Cunningham
- Education: Northwestern State University
- Occupation: Educator, then Attorney; Publisher of The Natchitoches Times (1903-1930)

Charles Milton Cunningham (April 2, 1877 – May 17, 1936) was a Louisiana attorney and newspaper publisher who served as a Democratic member of the Louisiana State Senate from 1915 to 1922.

Born in New Orleans, Louisiana, Cunningham received his undergraduate degree from Northwestern State University, taught briefly, and established The Natchitoches Times newspaper in 1903. He studied law, and was an unsuccessful candidate for a district judgeship in 1906.

Political offices
Preceded by Leopold Caspari	Louisiana State Senator for Natchitoches Parish; Charles Milton Cunningham; 1915 – 1922	Succeeded by J. Isaac Friedman
