= Monnie T. Cheves =

American academic and politician

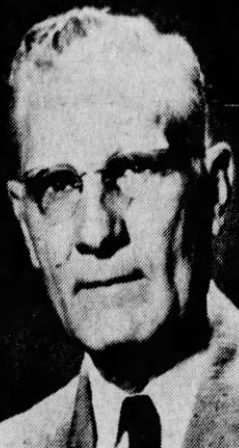
- Cheves in 1960

Member of the Louisiana House of Representatives
- In office 1952–1960

Personal details
- Born: Monnie Tom Cheves; February 14, 1902 Logansport, Louisiana, U.S.
- Died: August 14, 1988 (aged 86) Birmingham, Alabama, U.S.
- Party: Democratic
- Spouse: Kathryne Cheves
- Children: 1
- Education: Northwestern State University; Louisiana State University
- Occupation: Academic

Monnie Tom Cheves (February 14, 1902 – August 14, 1988) was an American academic and politician. A member of the Democratic Party, he served in the Louisiana House of Representatives from 1952 to 1960.

== Life and career ==
Cheves was born in Logansport, Louisiana, the son of Thomas Taylor Cheves and Miranda Hall. He attended Natchitoches Central High School, graduating in 1919. After graduating, he attended Northwestern State University, earning his Bachelor of Arts degree. He also attended Louisiana State University, earning his Master of Arts degree. He worked as a teacher.

Cheves served in the Louisiana House of Representatives from 1952 to 1960. After his service in the House, he worked as a coordinator and instructor of social science at Eastern Florida State College. During his years as an academic, he worked as a professor at Northwestern State University and Samford University, and was dean of education at Nocholla State College.

== Death ==
Cheves died on August 14, 1988, in Birmingham, Alabama, at the age of 86. He was buried at Fern Park Cemetery.
