= List of United States tornadoes in May 2019 =

United States tornadoes in May 2019
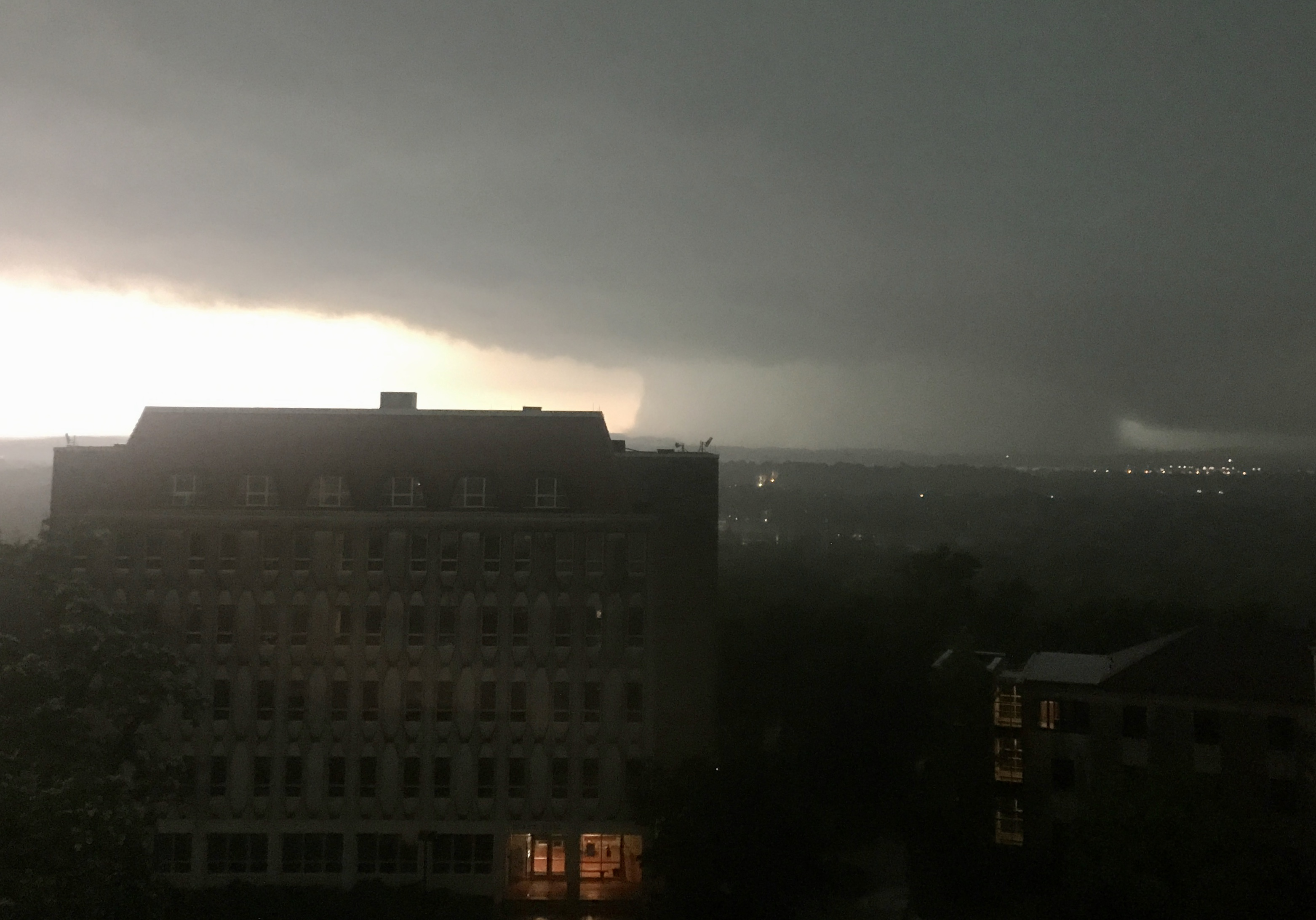
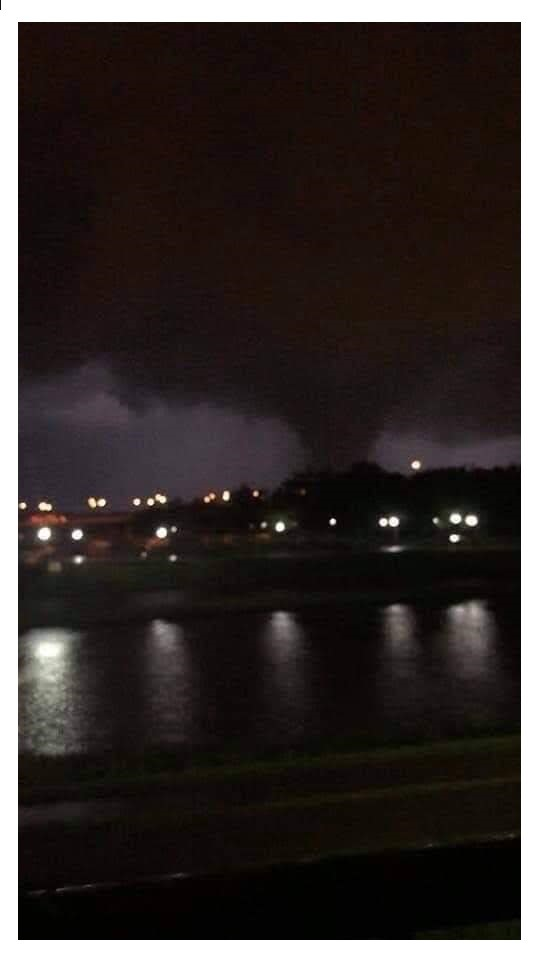
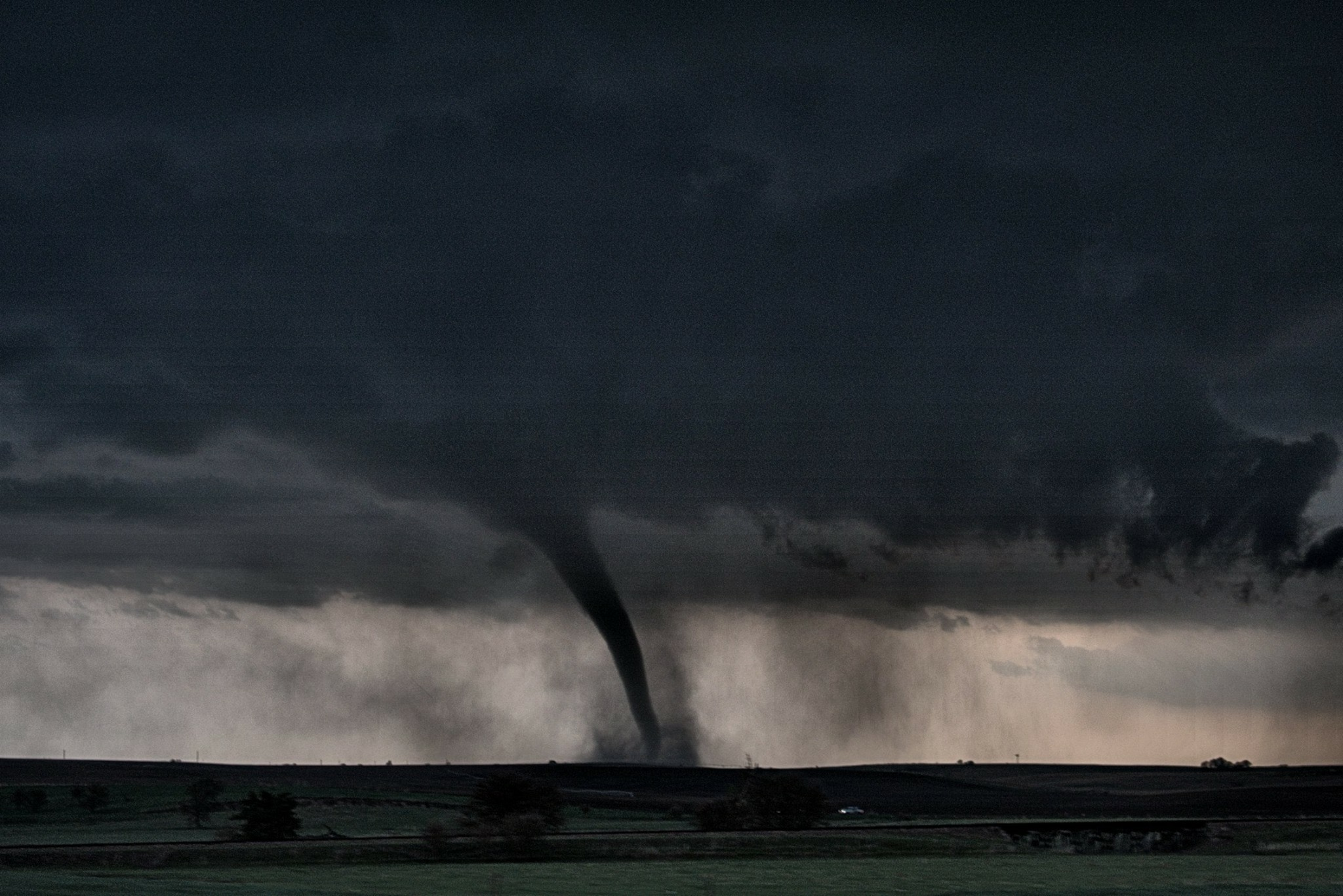
- Clockwise from top: A large rain-wrapped EF4 tornado as seen from Lawrence, Kansas; A tornado tracking through fields near Farnam, Nebraska on May 17; An EF4 tornado seen moving through Dayton, Ohio on May 27.
- Timespan: May 1–31
- Maximum rated tornado: EF4 tornado: Dayton, Ohio on May 27; Linwood, Kansas on May 28
- Tornadoes: 516
- Fatalities: 8
- Injuries: 293

This page documents all tornadoes confirmed by various weather forecast offices of the National Weather Service in the United States in May 2019.

== United States yearly total ==
Confirmed tornadoes by Enhanced Fujita rating
EFU	EF0	EF1	EF2	EF3	EF4	EF5	Total
179	655	540	119	33	3	0	1,529

== May ==
Confirmed tornadoes by Enhanced Fujita rating
EFU	EF0	EF1	EF2	EF3	EF4	EF5	Total
85	206	169	36	18	2	0	516

=== May 1 event ===
List of confirmed tornadoes – Wednesday, May 1, 2019 (Note: All dates are based on the local time zone where the tornado touched down; however, all times are in Coordinated Universal Time for consistency.)
EF#	Location	County / Parish	State	Start Coord.	Time (UTC)	Path length	Max width
EF1	S of LaCenter	Ballard	KY	37.062°N 88.9842°W	11:08–11:09	0.58 mi (0.93 km)	85 yd (78 m)
EF1	Several trees lost large limbs, and a few large trees were snapped along the path. A large section of roof on a home was lifted and thrown about 150 ft (46 m). A nearby storage building had its doors blown in, and the base of an exterior wall was shifted. A few other homes in the vicinity received minor shingle damage.						
EFU	SSW of Waurika	Jefferson	OK	34.1165°N 98.0268°W	18:26	0.5 mi (0.80 km)	20 yd (18 m)
EFU	Numerous people observed a brief tornado. No damage was reported.						
EFU	NW of Throckmorton	Throckmorton	TX	33.362°N 99.359°W	18:30–18:36	2.56 mi (4.12 km)	75 yd (69 m)
EFU	A trained storm spotter photographed a tornado.						
EFU	S of Seymour	Baylor	TX	33.402°N 99.217°W	19:01–19:24	1.33 mi (2.14 km)	200 yd (180 m)
EFU	A number of storm chasers reported a tornado that remained over open rangeland.						
EFU	E of Addington	Jefferson	OK	34.24°N 97.8475°W	19:08	0.2 mi (0.32 km)	30 yd (27 m)
EFU	Storm chasers reported a brief tornado.						
EF0	W of Marietta	Love	OK	33.942°N 97.212°W	21:21–21:29	3.16 mi (5.09 km)	50 yd (46 m)
EF0	Trees and a carport were damaged.						
EF0	N of Marietta	Love	OK	34.015°N 97.134°W	21:46–21:48	0.75 mi (1.21 km)	30 yd (27 m)
EF0	Trees were damaged.						
EF1	E of Leon	Love	OK	33.833°N 97.395°W	22:17–22:26	6.8 mi (10.9 km)	150 yd (140 m)
EF1	A mobile home was blown off its foundation and destroyed. Trees were damaged.						
EFU	SE of Haskell	Haskell	TX	32.96°N 99.51°W	22:46	0.01 mi (0.016 km)	30 yd (27 m)
EFU	The public reported a brief tornado.						
EFU	S of Jonesboro	Coryell	TX	31.5693°N 97.8892°W	01:23	0.01 mi (0.016 km)	10 yd (9.1 m)
EFU	The trained storm spotter reported a brief tornado.						

=== May 2 event ===
List of confirmed tornadoes – Thursday, May 2, 2019
EF#	Location	County / Parish	State	Start Coord.	Time (UTC)	Path length	Max width
EF1	NNW of Huxley	Shelby	TX	31.8531°N 93.9514°W	11:30–11:31	0.58 mi (0.93 km)	118 yd (108 m)
EF1	A small farm outbuilding and the roof of a chicken house were damaged. Numerous trees were snapped or uprooted.						
EF1	S of Stanley	DeSoto	LA	31.9298°N 93.9018°W	11:40–11:42	0.98 mi (1.58 km)	240 yd (220 m)
EF1	A metal awning was ripped off a mobile home, and numerous trees were snapped or uprooted.						
EF1	Mansfield	DeSoto	LA	32.0264°N 93.7245°W	12:08–12:09	0.22 mi (0.35 km)	330 yd (300 m)
EF1	A brief tornado destroyed several small sheds, ripped the roof of a metal awning, snapped a light pole off its concrete base, and snapped several trees.						
EF1	Mabelvale	Pulaski	AR	34.6507°N 92.4062°W	17:37–17:41	1.5 mi (2.4 km)	200 yd (180 m)
EF1	Some buildings were damaged and tractor trailers overturned. Several trees were also uprooted.						
EF0	N of Sherwood	Pulaski	AR	34.8526°N 92.2392°W	18:14–18:25	5.06 mi (8.14 km)	500 yd (460 m)
EF0	Several trees were downed, with some trees and branches falling on homes.						
EF0	W of Olmstead	Pulaski, Faulkner	AR	34.9250°N 92.2417°W	18:26–18:30	3.7 mi (6.0 km)	80 yd (73 m)
EF0	Several trees were uprooted.						
EF0	W of Cabot	Pulaski	AR	34.9663°N 92.1152°W	18:33–18:34	1.02 mi (1.64 km)	50 yd (46 m)
EF0	Several trees were uprooted or snapped, and a few buildings/sheds sustained minor roofing damage.						
EF0	SW of Otto to NNE of Cato	Faulkner	AR	34.9832°N 92.2403°W	18:35–18:37	0.66 mi (1.06 km)	50 yd (46 m)
EF0	Several trees were uprooted, and a shed was destroyed.						
EF0	W of Des Arc	Prairie	AR	34.9566°N 91.568°W	19:20–19:34	4.49 mi (7.23 km)	100 yd (91 m)
EF0	The public videoed a tornado over mainly open fields.						
EF0	ESE of Swifton	Jackson	AR	35.8012°N 91.0806°W	19:40–19:41	0.16 mi (0.26 km)	50 yd (46 m)
EF0	A brief, weak tornado passed over open fields, causing minimal damage.						
EF0	NE of Lafe	Greene	AR	36.2527°N 90.4634°W	21:29–21:30	0.21 mi (0.34 km)	50 yd (46 m)
EF0	A home was damaged.						
EF0	NW of Gosnell	Mississippi	AR	35.9744°N 89.9835°W	23:02–23:03	0.19 mi (0.31 km)	50 yd (46 m)
EF0	A large tree was uprooted.						
EF0	SE of Caruthersville, MO	Pemiscot	MO	36.1334°N 89.6301°W	23:11–23:18	2.76 mi (4.44 km)	150 yd (140 m)
EF0	Several trees were uprooted. The tornado stayed mostly along the Mississippi River levees.						
EF0	ESE of Ridgely	Obion	TN	36.2421°N 89.4278°W	23:20–23:21	0.21 mi (0.34 km)	100 yd (91 m)
EF0	Trees were uprooted along a creek bed.						
EF0	WNW of Hornbeak	Obion	TN	36.3434°N 89.3302°W	23:43–23:44	0.14 mi (0.23 km)	100 yd (91 m)
EF0	A few trees were uprooted, and tree limbs were broken off.						
EFU	NE of Comstock	Val Verde	TX	29.79°N 101.09°W	02:20–02:21	0.4 mi (0.64 km)	10 yd (9.1 m)
EFU	A storm chaser observed a tornado over open country. No damage was reported.						

=== May 3 event ===
List of confirmed tornadoes – Friday, May 3, 2019
EF#	Location	County / Parish	State	Start Coord.	Time (UTC)	Path length	Max width
EF0	ENE of Moulton	Lavaca, Fayette	TX	29.6024°N 97.0871°W	12:14–12:26	2.8 mi (4.5 km)	20 yd (18 m)
EF0	Several trees were damaged.						
EF0	ENE of Flatonia	Fayette	TX	29.7218°N 97.0163°W	13:14–13:26	4.17 mi (6.71 km)	20 yd (18 m)
EF0	A storage shed was destroyed while power lines and trees were damaged.						
EF2	Western La Grange	Fayette	TX	29.9071°N 96.9573°W	14:04–14:12	2.44 mi (3.93 km)	75 yd (69 m)
EF2	A strong tornado moved through western La Grange, destroying one large metal building while heavily damaging two others. Vehicles, as well as a 90,000 lb (41,000 kg) piece of machinery, were shifted and overturned. A small church was heavily damaged. Numerous trees were snapped or uprooted.						
EF0	NE of Marathon	Brewster	TX	30.3232°N 103.0242°W	17:59–18:00	0.08 mi (0.13 km)	50 yd (46 m)
EF0	A weak, brief landspout tornado caused no observable damage.						
EF0	SW of Eagle Lake	Colorado	TX	29.5465°N 96.3659°W	18:22–18:25	0.51 mi (0.82 km)	20 yd (18 m)
EF0	A tornado was videoed crossing a rice field.						
EF0	SW of Tomball	Harris	TX	30.08°N 95.65°W	19:00–19:03	0.3 mi (0.48 km)	15 yd (14 m)
EF0	A trained storm spotter videoed a tornado.						
EF0	NNE of Lion Country Safari	Palm Beach	FL	26.7476°N 80.352°W	20:50–20:51	0.03 mi (0.048 km)	20 yd (18 m)
EF0	A very small, brief tornado damaged a horse stable roof, nearby fencing, and some trees.						
EF0	N of Saint Lawrence	Glasscock	TX	31.7713°N 101.5°W	23:34–23:35	0.05 mi (0.080 km)	50 yd (46 m)
EF0	A landspout tornado occurred over open field. No damage was reported.						

=== May 4 event ===
List of confirmed tornadoes – Saturday, May 4, 2019
EF#	Location	County / Parish	State	Start Coord.	Time (UTC)	Path length	Max width
EF0	SE of Arcadia	Galveston	TX	29.359°N 95.131°W	07:31	0.1 mi (0.16 km)	30 yd (27 m)
EF0	A manufactured home and a storage shed were damaged. A tin roof was peeled off.						
EFU	NNE of Oakville	Plaquemines	LA	29.76°N 89.79°W	12:28	0.1 mi (0.16 km)	25 yd (23 m)
EFU	A photo of a waterspout or tornado over a marshy area was relayed via social media.						
EF1	Whitemarsh Island	Chatham	GA	32.0197°N 81.0184°W	20:53–20:57	2.2 mi (3.5 km)	170 yd (160 m)
EF1	A waterspout began over the Wilmington River. It moved ashore and struck a yacht club, where a boat was thrown from a crane into the water. The crane supporting the boat was pushed off its tracks and into a small building, resulting in significant roof damage to the building and injury to an occupant. Several homes had their shingles ripped off, and numerous trees were snapped or uprooted.						
EFU	WSW of Muleshoe	Bailey	TX	34.18°N 102.87°W	00:05	0.01 mi (0.016 km)	30 yd (27 m)
EFU	Storm chasers observed a brief landspout tornado over open field. No damage was reported.						
EFU	NNE of Adrian	Oldham	TX	35.37°N 102.62°W	00:28–00:29	0.09 mi (0.14 km)	10 yd (9.1 m)
EFU	Storm chasers witnessed a tornado. No damage was reported.						
EFU	S of Muleshoe	Bailey	TX	33.99°N 102.69°W	01:02	0.01 mi (0.016 km)	30 yd (27 m)
EFU	NWS employees viewed a storm chaser's live stream of a brief tornado. No damage was reported as the tornado remained over open land.						

=== May 5 event ===
List of confirmed tornadoes – Sunday, May 5, 2019
EF#	Location	County / Parish	State	Start Coord.	Time (UTC)	Path length	Max width
EF1	WNW of Ocala	Marion	FL	29.1906°N 82.2913°W	15:27–15:31	0.93 mi (1.50 km)	100 yd (91 m)
EF1	Several large trees were snapped; four homes suffered minor damage from fallen trees. The roof was torn off a shed, and two trailers were pushed 30–40 yd (27–37 m) from their original location.						
EF0	S of Seminole	Pinellas	FL	27.7937°N 82.7933°W	16:40–16:41	0.39 mi (0.63 km)	50 yd (46 m)
EF0	A waterspout moved ashore in Madeira Beach, damaging an unsecured porch, a carport, numerous trees, and power lines.						
EFU	ESE of Emerald	Lancaster	NE	40.8171°N 96.8029°W	22:35–22:36	0.02 mi (0.032 km)	50 yd (46 m)
EFU	A storm chaser observed a tornado over an open field.						
EF0	NW of Dodge City	Ford	KS	37.8817°N 100.1604°W	22:36–22:41	0.57 mi (0.92 km)	75 yd (69 m)
EF0	NWS employees observed a landspout tornado from their office.						
EF2	Lincoln	Lancaster	NE	40.7842°N 96.7583°W	22:38–22:39	0.55 mi (0.89 km)	200 yd (180 m)
EF2	A small ice cream shop and a storage shed were flattened by this brief but strong tornado. The roofs of a couple of homes in Lincoln were damaged, and trees were snapped or uprooted.						
EF2	NE of Tahoka	Lynn	TX	33.267°N 101.853°W	22:45–23:50	17.2 mi (27.7 km)	2,112 yd (1,931 m)
EF2	A strong and large tornado caused severe damage to power poles, farm equipment, and a manufactured home. Lesser damage occurred to another residence. At least one other tornado may have accompanied this tornado at times, but insufficient evidence existed to confirm their existence.						
EF1	N of Missler	Meade	KS	37.4045°N 100.4331°W	23:15–23:19	1.08 mi (1.74 km)	100 yd (91 m)
EF1	A storm chaser reported a tornado. No damage information is available.						
EF1	SSE of Ellinwood	Barton	KS	38.2814°N 98.5543°W	23:25–23:27	0.57 mi (0.92 km)	75 yd (69 m)
EF1	Three metal grain bin silos were damaged.						
EFU	WSW of Raymond	Rice	KS	38.26°N 98.47°W	23:30–23:31	0.22 mi (0.35 km)	50 yd (46 m)
EFU	A trained storm spotter witnessed a tornado. No damage was reported.						
EFU	N of Missler	Meade	KS	37.393°N 100.4342°W	23:49–23:51	0.42 mi (0.68 km)	75 yd (69 m)
EFU	A storm chaser reported a tornado over open pasture.						
EF0	SSW of Alden	Rice	KS	38.21°N 98.35°W	00:00–00:03	0.5 mi (0.80 km)	75 yd (69 m)
EF0	A center pivot irrigation system was damaged.						
EFU	NE of Missler	Meade	KS	37.3871°N 100.3602°W	00:04–00:07	0.73 mi (1.17 km)	75 yd (69 m)
EFU	A trained storm spotter reported a tornado over cropland.						
EF1	E of O'Donnell	Lynn	TX	33.020°N 101.658°W	00:12–00:25	5 mi (8.0 km)	880 yd (800 m)
EF1	Trees at a residence were damaged in a manner consistent with an EF1 tornado.						
EF0	N of Plevna	Reno	KS	38.14°N 98.33°W	00:13–00:15	0.35 mi (0.56 km)	200 yd (180 m)
EF0	A few power line poles were blown over.						
EF1	SSW of Nickerson	Reno	KS	38.1083°N 98.1058°W	00:34–00:36	0.14 mi (0.23 km)	300 yd (270 m)
EF1	Several outbuildings were damaged.						
EF1	SSW of Nickerson	Reno	KS	38.0951°N 98.1052°W	00:35–00:37	0.4 mi (0.64 km)	100 yd (91 m)
EF1	A 100 ft (30 m) long pole barn was destroyed, with some of its 1,000 lb (450 kg) girders lofted into a nearby field. Another pole barn was collapsed and surrounding trees were downed.						
EFU	SW of South Hutchinson	Reno	KS	38.0021°N 97.9644°W	01:00–01:01	0.18 mi (0.29 km)	50 yd (46 m)
EFU	A storm chaser witnessed a brief tornado over open country.						
EFU	SSE of South Hutchinson	Reno	KS	37.99°N 97.92°W	01:20–01:21	0.27 mi (0.43 km)	50 yd (46 m)
EFU	A brief tornado occurred over open country.						
EF0	NW of Wellington	Sumner	KS	37.29°N 97.42°W	01:39–01:43	0.79 mi (1.27 km)	75 yd (69 m)
EF0	A loafing shed was damaged.						
EFU	W of Miami	Roberts	TX	35.7397°N 100.7675°W	01:49–02:03	6.4 mi (10.3 km)	500 yd (460 m)
EFU	A large tornado was observed but caused no damage.						
EF0	SW of Gail	Borden	TX	32.6984°N 101.5152°W	01:59–02:01	0.42 mi (0.68 km)	50 yd (46 m)
EF0	Spotters observed a brief rope tornado.						
EF1	SW of Sumner	Noble	OK	36.282°N 97.198°W	04:54–04:56	1.5 mi (2.4 km)	30 yd (27 m)
EF1	A car was flipped, a garage door was damaged, and numerous trees were downed.						

=== May 6 event ===
List of confirmed tornadoes – Monday, May 6, 2019
EF#	Location	County / Parish	State	Start Coord.	Time (UTC)	Path length	Max width
EFU	NE of Cheyenne	Laramie	WY	41.23°N 104.7°W	22:00–22:03	0.38 mi (0.61 km)	30 yd (27 m)
EFU	The public reported a brief tornado. No known damage occurred.						
EFU	NW of Montezuma	Gray	KS	37.6993°N 100.5964°W	02:17–02:23	4.74 mi (7.63 km)	50 yd (46 m)
EFU	A QLCS tornado passed over open areas.						
EFU	N of Lewis	Edwards	KS	37.9931°N 99.234°W	02:43–02:49	2.81 mi (4.52 km)	150 yd (140 m)
EFU	A trained storm spotter reported a tornado. No known damage occurred.						

=== May 7 event ===
List of confirmed tornadoes – Tuesday, May 7, 2019
EF#	Location	County / Parish	State	Start Coord.	Time (UTC)	Path length	Max width
EFU	SSW of Spearman	Hutchinson, Hansford	TX	36.0391°N 101.2474°W	20:36–20:49	2.91 mi (4.68 km)	100 yd (91 m)
EFU	Eyewitnesses documented a tornado over an open field.						
EFU	SW of Edmonson	Hale	TX	34.2464°N 101.9757°W	21:27	0.01 mi (0.016 km)	30 yd (27 m)
EFU	Storm chasers observed a brief tornado. No damage was found.						
EF0	N of Fort Stockton	Pecos	TX	31.0776°N 102.845°W	21:48–21:54	2 mi (3.2 km)	200 yd (180 m)
EF0	A rain-wrapped tornado was observed by trained spotters and remained over open country.						
EF0	N of Borger	Hutchinson	TX	35.7072°N 101.4078°W	21:49–21:50	0.07 mi (0.11 km)	30 yd (27 m)
EF0	The roofs and shingles of homes were damaged.						
EF0	N of Perryton	Ochiltree	TX	36.4844°N 100.7996°W	21:50–21:51	0.03 mi (0.048 km)	20 yd (18 m)
EF0	A broadcast media crew photographed a brief tornado.						
EF0	S of Kimberly	Twin Falls	ID	42.4498°N 114.4151°W	22:00–22:15	1.51 mi (2.43 km)	10 yd (9.1 m)
EF0	Trees were downed at a farm.						
EFU	SW of Tulia	Swisher	TX	34.4752°N 101.8404°W	22:11–22:16	1.51 mi (2.43 km)	600 yd (550 m)
EFU	A large, multiple vortex tornado was photographed by several storm chasers. Despite its size, the tornado did no observable damage.						
EF0	E of Stinnett	Hutchinson	TX	35.8677°N 101.172°W	22:16–22:19	5.39 mi (8.67 km)	50 yd (46 m)
EF0	A cone tornado occurred over open fields.						
EFU	NW of Vigo Park	Swisher	TX	34.6813°N 101.6405°W	22:56–23:10	5.35 mi (8.61 km)	150 yd (140 m)
EFU	A rain wrapped tornado did no observable damage.						
EF0	E of Wayside to SSW of Goodnight	Armstrong	TX	34.7507°N 101.4431°W	23:27–23:35	11.49 mi (18.49 km)	100 yd (91 m)
EF0	Storm chasers reported a tornado.						
EF0	W of Lipscomb	Lipscomb	TX	36.2327°N 100.400°W	23:56	0.06 mi (0.097 km)	20 yd (18 m)
EF0	A trained storm spotter reported a brief tornado.						
EF0	Howardwick	Donley	TX	35.0258°N 100.8966°W	00:25–00:28	1.1 mi (1.8 km)	73 yd (67 m)
EF0	This weak tornado mainly did damage to trees, car ports and roofs of trailers.						
EF0	NW of Bakersfield	Pecos	TX	30.908°N 102.358°W	00:35–00:49	4.13 mi (6.65 km)	450 yd (410 m)
EF0	A tornado was observed over open country.						
EF0	S of Alanreed	Donley	TX	35.1127°N 100.775°W	00:48–00:52	4.24 mi (6.82 km)	500 yd (460 m)
EF0	Trees and barns were damaged.						
EFU	SE of Texola	Beckham	OK	35.096°N 99.963°W	01:12–01:16	2 mi (3.2 km)	100 yd (91 m)
EFU	Multiple observers reported a tornado. No known damage occurred.						
EFU	N of Butler	Custer	OK	35.773°N 99.181°W	01:32–01:36	2 mi (3.2 km)	50 yd (46 m)
EFU	Two storm chasers witnessed a tornado. No damage was reported.						
EFU	NW of Carter	Beckham	OK	35.2609°N 99.5501°W	03:10	0.5 mi (0.80 km)	30 yd (27 m)
EFU	A television storm chaser witnessed a brief tornado. No known damage occurred.						
EF0	SSW of Haverhill	Butler	KS	37.63°N 96.92°W	04:19–04:22	1.9 mi (3.1 km)	100 yd (91 m)
EF0	A tornado damaged trees.						
EF2	NNE of Hobart to SSW of Cordell	Kiowa, Washita	OK	35.065°N 99.08°W	04:23-04:55	12.5 mi (20.1 km)	400 yd (370 m)
EF2	A strong tornado damaged or destroyed several outbuildings and at least five mobile homes, in addition to utility poles and trees.						
EFU	SSW of Cordell	Washita	OK	35.2231°N 99.0239°W	04:46–04:48	0.5 mi (0.80 km)	40 yd (37 m)
EFU	A second simultaneous tornado occurred near Cordell. Storm chasers were unable to discern whether this was a tornado along a parallel path or a satellite tornado. No damage was reported.						
EF1	Newkirk	Kay	OK	36.873°N 97.066°W	04:57–05:01	2.1 mi (3.4 km)	60 yd (55 m)
EF1	This tornado caused areas of damage in Newkirk, damaging the roofs of at least six homes and businesses and significantly damaging a mobile home. Tree damage also occurred, although some damage attributed to the tornado may have been caused by straight-line winds.						

=== May 8 event ===
List of confirmed tornadoes – Wednesday, May 8, 2019
EF#	Location	County / Parish	State	Start Coord.	Time (UTC)	Path length	Max width
EFU	N of Headrick	Kiowa	OK	34.728°N 99.095°W	05:27	0.5 mi (0.80 km)	30 yd (27 m)
EFU	A storm chaser witnessed a brief, narrow tornado. No known damage occurred.						
EF0	NNE of Hearne	Robertson	TX	30.9538°N 96.5681°W	18:29–18:30	0.26 mi (0.42 km)	100 yd (91 m)
EF0	This brief tornado damaged a barn and was embedded in a larger area of straight line winds, which also caused damage.						
EF0	SW of College Station	Brazos	TX	30.5642°N 96.3827°W	19:21–19:24	0.88 mi (1.42 km)	15 yd (14 m)
EF0	Law enforcement sighted a tornado.						
EF1	NE of Nesbitt to SSE of Jefferson	Harrison	TX	32.6219°N 94.3974°W	19:36–19:45	7.38 mi (11.88 km)	300 yd (270 m)
EF1	A few homes sustained damage from fallen trees or branches. Many trees were also snapped or uprooted.						
EF1	Bethany, TX to SSW of Greenwood, LA	Panola (TX), Caddo (LA)	TX, LA	32.3729°N 94.0447°W	20:19–20:24	2.61 mi (4.20 km)	200 yd (180 m)
EF1	This tornado touched down in Bethany, where it uprooted a tree and removed the roofing of a service station. Elsewhere, several trees were snapped or uprooted.						
EF1	Keatchi	De Soto	LA	32.1849°N 93.9325°W	20:33–20:36	1.83 mi (2.95 km)	200 yd (180 m)
EF1	This tornado snapped and uprooted several trees and destroyed a large metal farm canopy near Keatchi.						
EF1	Stonewall	De Soto	LA	32.2187°N 93.8360°W	20:44–21:02	12.59 mi (20.26 km)	500 yd (460 m)
EF1	Numerous trees were snapped and uprooted, and some power poles were snapped as well. One home sustained significant damage when several large trees fell on it.						
EF1	E of Stonewall	De Soto, Caddo	LA	32.2555°N 93.7219°W	20:53–21:02	3.92 mi (6.31 km)	80 yd (73 m)
EF1	A metal farm outbuilding was lofted and destroyed. Several trees were also snapped or uprooted.						
EF1	S of Saline	Natchitoches	LA	32.1146°N 93.0236°W	22:15–22:22	2.98 mi (4.80 km)	250 yd (230 m)
EF1	This tornado snapped or uprooted several trees.						
EF1	ENE of Readhimer to ESE of Saline	Natchitoches, Winn	LA	32.1278°N 92.9456°W	22:22–22:26	2.85 mi (4.59 km)	250 yd (230 m)
EF1	Trees were snapped and twisted in the Kisatchie National Forest.						
EF1	S of Jonesboro	Jackson	LA	32.2024°N 92.7117°W	22:35–22:36	0.42 mi (0.68 km)	70 yd (64 m)
EF1	A brief tornado downed and uprooted approximately 15 trees.						
EF1	SE of Jonesboro	Jackson	LA	32.2153°N 92.7124°W	22:35–22:41	7.36 mi (11.84 km)	100 yd (91 m)
EF1	This tornado damaged a small portion of the roof on the Charles H Garrett Community Center. It also damaged a metal building, causing the column anchorage to fail. Several trees were snapped and uprooted as well.						
EF1	E of Jonesboro to SW of Chatham	Jackson	LA	32.2396°N 92.5834°W	22:42–22:48	4.03 mi (6.49 km)	350 yd (320 m)
EF1	This damaging tornado downed and uprooted approximately 150 trees. The trees fell into multiple campers and approximately three fourths of the cabins in the park.						
EF1	SSE of Grambling to SSE of Ruston	Jackson, Lincoln	LA	32.4452°N 92.6881°W	22:47–22:55	5.43 mi (8.74 km)	80 yd (73 m)
EF1	This tornado ripped the roof off a small outbuilding, completely destroyed a shed, and ripped shingles from the roof of a single family home. The tornado rolled a single-wide mobile home off its foundation, tossing it approximately 10 yd (9.1 m) and destroying it as it landed.						
EF1	ENE of Pine Bluff	Jefferson	AR	34.2232°N 91.9826°W	23:18–23:19	0.26 mi (0.42 km)	100 yd (91 m)
EF1	The brick facings and roofs of two apartment complexes were damaged. At least two walls were caved in, exposing some apartment units. Trees and utility poles were snapped. Four people were injured.						
EF1	ENE of Richwood to SE of Swartz	Ouachita	LA	32.4676°N 91.9828°W	23:36–23:41	4.27 mi (6.87 km)	75 yd (69 m)
EF1	Some trees were damaged or snapped.						
EF1	E of Richwood to NW of Rayville	Richland	LA	32.4476°N 91.9241°W	23:36–23:48	8.89 mi (14.31 km)	200 yd (180 m)
EF1	A metal shed was destroyed, three homes sustained shingle damage, and two metal carports were thrown. Several trees were snapped or uprooted.						
EF0	NW of Nogal	Lincoln	NM	33.616°N 105.741°W	23:45–23:48	0.03 mi (0.048 km)	20 yd (18 m)
EF0	The public reported a landspout tornado over rural countryside.						
EF1	NNE of Rayville to E of Oak Ridge	Richland	LA	32.5198°N 91.7381°W	23:52–00:03	7.88 mi (12.68 km)	300 yd (270 m)
EF1	Many trees were snapped and uprooted by this tornado.						

=== May 9 event ===
List of confirmed tornadoes – Thursday, May 9, 2019
EF#	Location	County / Parish	State	Start Coord.	Time (UTC)	Path length	Max width
EF1	N of Jackson	Hinds	MS	32.3922°N 90.2526°W	13:41–13:50	3.54 mi (5.70 km)	550 yd (500 m)
EF1	Some trees were uprooted and many large limbs were snapped.						
EF1	WNW of McComb	Pike	MS	31.2541°N 90.4936°W	16:12–16:21	0.81 mi (1.30 km)	270 yd (250 m)
EF1	Some trees were snapped and uprooted.						
EF0	N of Hazel Green, AL	Madison (AL), Lincoln (TN)	AL, TN	34.9901°N 86.5661°W	17:46–17:52	2.56 mi (4.12 km)	75 yd (69 m)
EF0	Trees and tree limbs were downed; two large hardwood trees being uprooted and falling on a house, causing heavy damage.						
EF1	NE of Albertville	Marshall	AL	34.3220°N 86.1166°W	18:30–18:32	0.48 mi (0.77 km)	25 yd (23 m)
EF1	This tornado caused minor damage to three barns or sheds, and snapped a number of trees.						
EF1	SE of Fyffe	DeKalb	AL	34.4047°N 85.8803°W	18:55–18:57	0.57 mi (0.92 km)	25 yd (23 m)
EF1	This tornado almost entirely collapsed a barn and a poultry house, peeling away the roofing of a second poultry house. A mobile home across the street sustained minor damage, and a nearby shed was destroyed, with debris being spread over 0.25 mi (0.40 km).						

=== May 11 event ===
List of confirmed tornadoes – Saturday, May 11, 2019
EF#	Location	County / Parish	State	Start Coord.	Time (UTC)	Path length	Max width
EF1	SW of Red House	Campbell	VA	37.1673°N 78.8998°W	20:35–20:46	4.1 mi (6.6 km)	275 yd (251 m)
EF1	Three homes sustained minor damage and four outbuildings were severely damaged or destroyed. A modular home was overturned, and several trees were snapped or uprooted.						
EF1	WSW of Norwood	Stanly	NC	35.2020°N 80.2020°W	20:40–20:44	1.1 mi (1.8 km)	295 yd (270 m)
EF1	Several trees were snapped and uprooted in or near Cottonville. Some farm outbuildings also sustained minor damage.						
EF1	Suffolk	Suffolk (city)	VA	36.7398°N 76.5827°W	22:52–22:55	2 mi (3.2 km)	200 yd (180 m)
EF1	This tornado damaged at least 14 homes and 6 businesses. Shingles were torn off roofs, windows were blown in, and one air conditioner was ripped off a roof. Numerous trees were snapped or uprooted, with one impaling the roof of a home.						

=== May 12 event ===
List of confirmed tornadoes – Sunday, May 12, 2019
EF#	Location	County / Parish	State	Start Coord.	Time (UTC)	Path length	Max width
EF0	E of Dothan	Houston	AL	31.2212°N 85.3765°W	15:33–15:34	0.92 mi (1.48 km)	100 yd (91 m)
EF0	A few gravestones were knocked down, and three businesses suffered minor roof or pillar damage.						

=== May 13 event ===
List of confirmed tornadoes – Monday, May 13, 2019
EF#	Location	County / Parish	State	Start Coord.	Time (UTC)	Path length	Max width
EF2	NE of Knightdale to NNW of Bailey	Wake, Franklin, Nash	NC	35.8275°N 78.4399°W	14:13–14:39	17.18 mi (27.65 km)	385 yd (352 m)
EF2	This strong tornado collapsed the exterior walls of a single family home and destroyed several metal farm buildings. Sheet metal was wrapped around a nearby tree. An RV was flipped over numerous times, landing crushed in an open field. Another home had its windows blown out and roof damaged, and an open-air outhouse suffered structural damage. One newly constructed home sustained moderate roof damage, a modular home suffered roof and wall damage, and two farm outhouses were severely damaged. One home also lost its chimney and a cinder block outhouse underwent complete roof failure. Throughout its path and in the town of Zebulon, many trees were snapped and uprooted.						

=== May 19 event ===
List of confirmed tornadoes – Sunday, May 19, 2019
EF#	Location	County / Parish	State	Start Coord.	Time (UTC)	Path length	Max width
EF1	SE of Town Bluff	Tyler, Jasper	TX	30.7557°N 94.1459°W	06:07–06:09	1.3 mi (2.1 km)	600 yd (550 m)
EF1	Numerous trees were snapped or uprooted, including one that fell on a mobile home, injuring a man inside. Twenty-two power poles were damaged.						
EF1	SW of Jasper	Jasper	TX	30.7988°N 94.0808°W	06:21–06:30	3.08 mi (4.96 km)	100 yd (91 m)
EF1	A mobile home was severely damaged, and numerous pine trees were snapped.						
EF0	W of Mora	Natchitoches	LA	31.3732°N 92.9990°W	07:02–07:05	1.19 mi (1.92 km)	80 yd (73 m)
EF0	Several large tree branches were snapped.						
EF1	SSW of Mangham to WNW of Delhi	Richland	LA	32.2825°N 91.789°W	07:46–08:11	18.67 mi (30.05 km)	700 yd (640 m)
EF1	Several outbuildings sustained minor damage, and many trees were snapped or uprooted.						
EF1	N of Singer	Beauregard	LA	30.7028°N 93.4165°W	08:14–08:18	2.91 mi (4.68 km)	600 yd (550 m)
EF1	Numerous pine trees were snapped or uprooted.						
EF1	NE of Singer	Beauregard	LA	30.7266°N 93.3785°W	08:19–08:24	2.6 mi (4.2 km)	800 yd (730 m)
EF1	Several barns and mobile homes were damaged. Numerous pine trees were snapped or uprooted.						
EF1	SW of DeRidder	Beauregard	LA	30.7775°N 93.3449°W	08:26–08:30	2.67 mi (4.30 km)	250 yd (230 m)
EF1	Trees were snapped along the path.						
EF1	WNW of Elizabeth	Allen	LA	30.866°N 92.8327°W	09:40–09:47	2.26 mi (3.64 km)	50 yd (46 m)
EF1	Numerous softwood trees were snapped, and shingles were ripped off a home.						
EF1	S of Oakdale	Allen	LA	30.7093°N 92.6624°W	10:03–10:14	1.3 mi (2.1 km)	900 yd (820 m)
EF1	Numerous softwood trees and power poles were snapped, and some trees caused roof damage to homes upon falling.						
EF0	SSE of Mamou	Evangeline	LA	30.6044°N 92.4°W	10:42–10:43	0.23 mi (0.37 km)	50 yd (46 m)
EF0	A manufactured home was pulled off its blocks.						
EF1	E of Mamou	Evangeline	LA	30.6095°N 92.3345°W	10:47–11:06	9.07 mi (14.60 km)	400 yd (370 m)
EF1	The roof of one house was ripped off and several others were severely damaged by this high-end EF1 tornado. One manufactured home was demolished and a second was flipped. Trees were snapped as well.						
EF1	Ville Platte	Evangeline	LA	30.6837°N 92.2911°W	10:50–10:59	2.46 mi (3.96 km)	600 yd (550 m)
EF1	Numerous trees and power poles were snapped in town.						
EF0	Montpelier	St. Helena	LA	30.6796°N 90.6528°W	13:30–13:31	0.18 mi (0.29 km)	30 yd (27 m)
EF0	This tornado damaged the roof of a business and knocked a tree onto a mobile home in Montpelier.						
EF0	NNE of Lacey	Barry	MI	42.5334°N 85.1745°W	22:25–22:28	1.35 mi (2.17 km)	50 yd (46 m)
EF0	Three barns on a farm were damaged, a telephone pole was blown down, and about a dozen trees were snapped or uprooted.						
EF0	E of Huron	Fresno	CA	36.20°N 119.99°W	22:41–22:42	0.35 mi (0.56 km)	100 yd (91 m)
EF0	A brief tornado was observed. No known damage occurred.						
EF1	W of Cocalico	Lancaster	PA	40.241°N 76.1637°W	00:03–00:05	0.84 mi (1.35 km)	125 yd (114 m)
EF1	Some mobile homes sustained minor damage, and a storage shed was destroyed. Three homes sustained roof damage, one of which lost its roof entirely. Three minor injuries were caused by flying debris. Many trees were downed with some falling on the Pennsylvania Turnpike, prompting its temporary closure.						
EF1	NW of Eaton	Preble	OH	39.7529°N 84.7042°W	00:39–00:46	4.41 mi (7.10 km)	150 yd (140 m)
EF1	Numerous trees were snapped or uprooted, one of which fell on and caused facade damage to a home. A second house suffered significant roof removal and siding damage. A power pole was downed, a barn was partially collapsed, and another residence had its siding ripped off.						
EF1	West Alexandria to N of New Lebanon	Preble, Montgomery	OH	39.7349°N 84.5450°W	00:50–01:01	7.6 mi (12.2 km)	120 yd (110 m)
EF1	The most significant damage from this tornado occurred at an industrial facility in West Alexandria, where an old masonry building lost part of its roof and suffered the collapse of most of its east-facing wall. A modern industrial building saw minor roof and facade damage, and a dumpster was lofted about 100 ft (30 m) from its original location. Numerous trees were snapped or uprooted in town, and an outbuilding sustained roof damage. Farther along the path, barns and outbuildings were damaged or destroyed, and sheet metal was scattered through fields. Homes sustained roof damage, and many trees were snapped or uprooted. Fencing was downed, a street sign was thrown into a field, and a swing set was tossed as well.						
EF1	Huber Heights	Montgomery	OH	39.8509°N 84.1497°W	01:22–01:24	0.97 mi (1.56 km)	150 yd (140 m)
EF1	Numerous homes suffered minor roof and siding damage in a residential area of Huber Heights. One home had its porch awning lifted and blown into the road. Numerous trees were snapped or uprooted as well.						
EF1	Tinicum Township	Bucks	PA	40.49°N 75.14°W	01:51–01:52	0.26 mi (0.42 km)	100 yd (91 m)
EF1	Dozens of trees were snapped or uprooted, and three camping trailers were significantly damaged by fallen trees.						

=== May 24 event ===
List of confirmed tornadoes – Friday, May 24, 2019
EF#	Location	County / Parish	State	Start Coord.	Time (UTC)	Path length	Max width
EF1	Marysville	Marshall	KS	39.8254°N 96.6876°W	08:40–08:50	9.6 mi (15.4 km)	50 yd (46 m)
EF1	A tornado moved through Marysville, blowing two 30,000 US gal (110,000 L) gas tanks across a highway, snapping numerous power lines and trees, overturning a semi-truck, destroying an outbuilding, and damaging a building.						
EF1	N of Seneca	Nemaha	KS	39.8863°N 96.0678°W	09:19–09:25	5.94 mi (9.56 km)	50 yd (46 m)
EF1	This tornado damaged a farmstead and subsequently remained over rural areas.						
EF1	N of Selman	Harper	OK	36.975°N 99.498°W	09:42–09:47	2 mi (3.2 km)	150 yd (140 m)
EF1	An outbuilding was destroyed and numerous trees were downed at a ranch.						
EF1	N of Industry	McDonough	IL	40.3264°N 90.6368°W	17:33–17:38	7.75 mi (12.47 km)	50 yd (46 m)
EF1	Outbuildings were destroyed at two farmsteads. Large trees and power poles were downed as well.						
EF1	NE of Industry	McDonough	IL	40.3674°N 90.5595°W	17:41–17:45	1.85 mi (2.98 km)	30 yd (27 m)
EF1	Outbuildings were destroyed while power poles and trees were snapped.						
EF0	W of Lewistown	Fulton	IL	40.3799°N 90.2619°W	18:10–18:12	1.17 mi (1.88 km)	20 yd (18 m)
EF0	A few tree limbs were downed.						
EF1	Douglass	Butler	KS	37.5093°N 97.0107°W	21:19–21:23	1.35 mi (2.17 km)	75 yd (69 m)
EF1	Significant tree damage occurred, and a building in town had half of its roof peeled off.						
EFU	S of Rosalia	Butler	KS	37.7485°N 96.621°W	21:53-21:54	0.19 mi (0.31 km)	50 yd (46 m)
EFU	A storm chaser observed a tornado in a field. No known damage occurred.						
EF1	NE of Leal	Barnes	ND	47.11°N 98.31°W	22:24–22:31	4.08 mi (6.57 km)	150 yd (140 m)
EF1	A small shed was destroyed, with pieces of the building impaled into the side of a home. Roofing was ripped from another house and a grain storage building. Trees were snapped in shelter belts.						
EF0	E of Rogers	Barnes	ND	47.08°N 98.08°W	23:11–23:12	0.24 mi (0.39 km)	75 yd (69 m)
EF0	A small rope tornado snapped several tree limbs.						
EF0	NW of Hope	Steele	ND	47.32°N 97.81°W	23:20–23:28	4.5 mi (7.2 km)	150 yd (140 m)
EF0	A tornado embedded in downburst winds snapped multiple trees in a shelter belt.						
EF0	S of Blair	Jackson	OK	34.7655°N 99.33°W	23:35	0.5 mi (0.80 km)	20 yd (18 m)
EF0	A mobile home, outbuildings, and trees were damaged.						
EF1	E of Frytown to Southern Iowa City	Johnson	IA	41.5689°N 91.7208°W	23:36–00:04	10.76 mi (17.32 km)	75 yd (69 m)
EF1	Outbuildings were destroyed, and numerous vehicle trailers were tossed and destroyed as this high-end EF1 tornado struck a trailer sales business. Rooftops were damaged, and trees were snapped or uprooted as well. The tornado weakened as it entered the south side of Iowa City, where minor roof damage occurred and a school bus sustained broken windows.						
EF0	N of Waubun	Norman, Mahnomen	MN	47.18°N 96.07°W	00:22–00:36	6.56 mi (10.56 km)	200 yd (180 m)
EF0	Large tree branches were snapped. Two separate weather stations recorded gusts of 73 mph (117 km/h).						
EF0	NE of West Branch	Cedar	IA	41.7285°N 91.3094°W	00:27–00:28	0.04 mi (0.064 km)	10 yd (9.1 m)
EF0	Tree damage occurred at a farmstead.						
EF1	N of Waubun	Mahnomen	MN	47.21°N 95.98°W	00:30–00:35	3.5 mi (5.6 km)	200 yd (180 m)
EF1	Several trees were snapped.						
EF0	Longview Lake	Jackson	MO	38.8733°N 94.4436°W	01:00–01:01	0.25 mi (0.40 km)	50 yd (46 m)
EF0	A brief, weak tornado touched down near Longview Lake. No damage was reported.						
EF0	Lake Lotawana	Jackson	MO	38.9152°N 94.2683°W	01:08–01:09	0.68 mi (1.09 km)	25 yd (23 m)
EF0	Some trees were damaged.						
EF0	NE of Altamont	Lafayette	MO	39.9178°N 94.0487°W	01:19–01:25	2.72 mi (4.38 km)	40 yd (37 m)
EF0	A carport and outbuilding were damaged, as well as several trees.						
EF0	WNW of Coon Valley	Vernon	WI	43.7224°N 91.0805°W	01:40–01:42	0.15 mi (0.24 km)	20 yd (18 m)
EF0	Trees were damaged.						

=== May 31 event ===
List of confirmed tornadoes – Friday, May 31, 2019
EF#	Location	County / Parish	State	Start Coord.	Time (UTC)	Path length	Max width
EF0	E of Marathon	Brewster	TX	30.1975°N 103.1215°W	00:25–00:27	0.39 mi (0.63 km)	30 yd (27 m)
EF0	A landspout tornado occurred but caused no damage.						

== See also ==
- Tornadoes of 2019
- List of United States tornadoes in April 2019
- List of United States tornadoes from June to August 2019
