= Dowden =

Dowden (/ˈdaʊdən/) is an English family name. It is a patronymic from an Old English personal name, Dogod (probably a derivative of dugan 'to avail', 'to be of use'), chiefly found in Gloucestershire and Somerset. Notable people with the surname include:

- Abraham Dowden (1839–1907), American politician
- Bradley Dowden (born 1942), American philosopher
- Corey Dowden (born 1968), American football player in the National Football League
- Edward Dowden (1843–1913), Irish critic and poet
- Hester Dowden (1868–1949), Irish spiritual medium
- John Dowden (1840–1910), Irish bishop
- Ken Dowden (born 1950), English scholar
- Oliver Dowden (born 1978), British Conservative Party politician, MP for Hertsmere since May 2015
- Richard Dowden (born 1949), English journalist
- Richard Dowden (1932–2016), New Zealand scientist
- Steve Dowden (1929–2001), American football player in the National Football League
