= Boozman =

Boozman is a surname. Notable people with the surname include:

- Curtis Boozman (1898–1979), American politician
- Fay Boozman (1946–2005), American ophthalmologist and politician
- John Boozman (born 1950), American politician and former optometrist
