= Bellwood, Louisiana =

Bellwood
- Unincorporated community
- Location within the state of Louisiana
- Coordinates: 31°31′38.64″N 93°12′19.4394″W
- Country: United States
- State: Louisiana
- Parish: Natchitoches
- Elevation: 131 ft (40 m)
- Time zone: UTC-6 (Central (CST))
  - Summer (DST): UTC-5 (CDT)
- ZIP code: 71468
- GNIS feature ID: 547054

Bellwood is an unincorporated community in Natchitoches Parish, Louisiana, United States. It is located on LA-117, south of Provencal near Kisatchie National Forest. Local waterways include Dry Creek and Middle Creek.

The community is part of the Natchitoches Micropolitan Statistical Area.

== See also ==
- Anne des Cadeaux
- Natchitoches, Louisiana
