= Cypress, Natchitoches Parish, Louisiana =

Cypress
- Unincorporated community
- Location within the state of Louisiana
- Coordinates: 31°36′19.4394″N 93°2′19.6794″W
- Country: United States
- State: Louisiana
- Parish: Natchitoches
- Elevation: 24 ft (7.3 m)
- Time zone: UTC-6 (Central (CST))
  - Summer (DST): UTC-5 (CDT)
- ZIP code: 71457
- Area code: 337
- GNIS feature ID: 547366

Cypress is an unincorporated community in Natchitoches Parish, Louisiana, United States. It is located near the intersection of Old River Road and LA-120, east of Flora on Isle Brevelle near the El Camino Real de los Tejas National Historic Trail. The local waterways include Old River, Bayou Brevelle, and Kisatchie Bayou.

The community is part of the Natchitoches Micropolitan Statistical Area.

== See also ==
- Natchitoches, Louisiana
- Anne des Cadeaux
- Cane River
