= Bermuda, Louisiana =

Bermuda
- Unincorporated community
- Location within the state of Louisiana
- Coordinates: 31°39′44.64″N 93°0′13.6794″W
- Country: United States
- State: Louisiana
- Parish: Natchitoches
- Elevation: 110 ft (34 m)
- Time zone: UTC-6 (Central (CST))
  - Summer (DST): UTC-5 (CDT)
- ZIP code: 71456
- GNIS feature ID: 542983

Bermuda is an unincorporated community in Natchitoches Parish, Louisiana, United States. It is located near the Cane River Creole National Historic Park on LA-112, south of Point Place near Isle Brevelle and the Oakland Plantation. Local waterways include the Cane River.

The community is part of the Natchitoches Micropolitan Statistical Area.

== Churches ==
St. Charles Chapel at Bermuda is a historic Catholic chapel founded in the early 1900s by French Creole families as a mission of St. Augustine Catholic Parish Church of Isle Brevelle. It is the cultural and religious center of the area's Louisiana Creole people.

== See also ==
- Natchitoches, Louisiana
- Anne des Cadeaux
