= Vienna Bend, Louisiana =

- Census-designated place
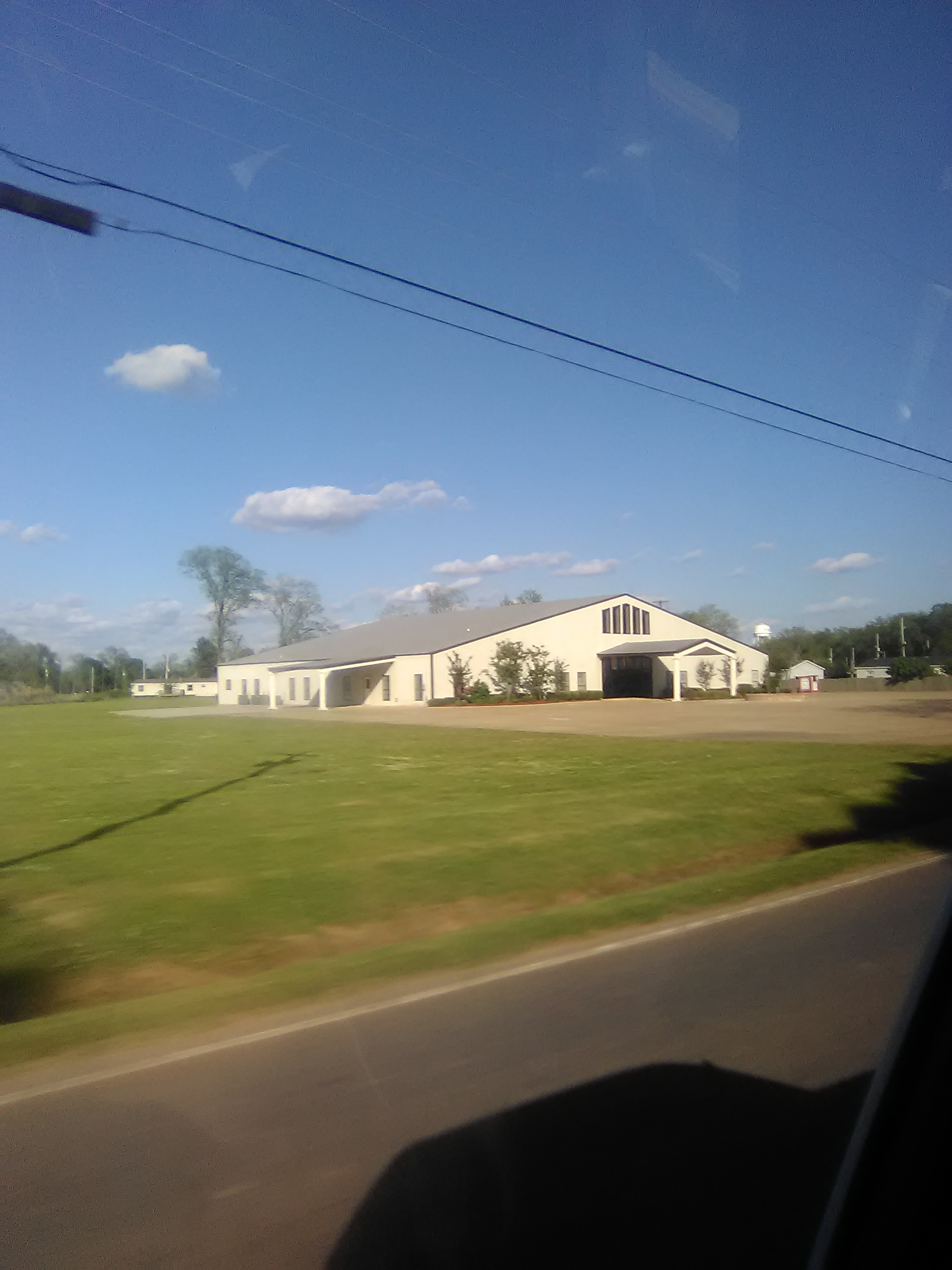
- Church off Highway 494

- Location within Louisiana Location within the United States
- Coordinates: 31°43′57″N 93°02′28″W
- Country: United States
- State: Louisiana
- Parish: Natchitoches Parish

Area
  - Total: 2.20 sq mi (5.71 km^{2})
  - Land: 2.16 sq mi (5.59 km^{2})
  - Water: 0.046 sq mi (0.12 km^{2})
- Elevation: 112 ft (34 m)

Population (2020)
  - Total: 1,314
  - Density: 609.0/sq mi (235.15/km^{2})
- ZIP code: 71457
- Area code: 318
- FIPS code: 22-78545

Vienna Bend is an unincorporated community and census-designated place (CDP) in Natchitoches Parish, Louisiana, United States. As of the 2020 census, Vienna Bend had a population of 1,314.

== Demographics ==
Historical population
Census	Pop.	Note	%±
2020	1,314		—
U.S. Decennial Census

Vienna Bend first appeared as a census designated place in the 2010 U.S. census.

Vienna Bend CDP, Louisiana – Racial and ethnic composition Note: the US Census treats Hispanic/Latino as an ethnic category. This table excludes Latinos from the racial categories and assigns them to a separate category. Hispanics/Latinos may be of any race.
Race / Ethnicity (NH = Non-Hispanic)	Pop 2010	Pop 2020	% 2010	% 2020
White alone (NH)	582	377	46.52%	28.69%
Black or African American alone (NH)	582	772	46.52%	58.75%
Native American or Alaska Native alone (NH)	10	17	0.80%	1.29%
Asian alone (NH)	4	15	0.32%	1.14%
Native Hawaiian or Pacific Islander alone (NH)	1	0	0.08%	0.00%
Other race alone (NH)	25	27	2.00%	2.05%
Mixed race or Multiracial (NH)	27	61	2.16%	4.64%
Hispanic or Latino (any race)	20	45	1.60%	3.42%
Total	1,251	1,314	100.00%	100.00%
