= Numa T. Delouche =

American politician (1888–1965)

Louisiana State Representative for Natchitoches Parish
- In office 1944–1948
- Preceded by: Two-member district: Arthur C. Watson John O. Williams
- Succeeded by: Two-member district: Sylvan Friedman Roy Sanders

Personal details
- Born: October 10, 1888 Natchitoches Parish; Louisiana, USA
- Died: July 7, 1965 (aged 76)
- Resting place: St. John the Baptist Catholic Cemetery in Cloutierville, Louisiana
- Party: Democratic
- Spouse: Marie Vercher Delouche
- Children: Numalee Pauline Delouche (1928-1934)

Numa T. Delouche (October 10, 1888 – July 7, 1965), was a Democrat from Cloutierville in south Natchitoches Parish, who served in the Louisiana House of Representatives for one term between 1944 and 1948, along with Sylvan Friedman of nearby Natchez, Louisiana.

Delouche was married to Mary Vercher (1903–1979); their child, Numalee Pauline Delouche (1928–1934) died at the age of six. The Delouches are interred at St. John the Baptist Catholic Church Cemetery in Cloutierville.

Political offices
Preceded by Two-member district: Arthur C. Watson; John O. Williams	Louisiana State Representative for Natchitoches Parish; 1944–1948; Served alongside: Sylvan Friedman	Succeeded by Two-member district: Sylvan Friedman; Roy Sanders
