= Victoria, Louisiana =

- Unincorporated community
- Location within Louisiana Location within the United States
- Coordinates: 31°39′51″N 93°13′32″W
- Country: United States
- State: Louisiana
- Parish: Natchitoches
- Time zone: UTC-6 (CST)
  - Summer (DST): UTC-5 (CDT)
- Area code: 318

Victoria is an unincorporated community in Natchitoches Parish, Louisiana, United States.

== History ==
Sawmill town that began small about 1882, was purchased by the Louisiana Longleaf Lumber Company in 1898, that had a sawmill in Fisher, and the population grew to 1500. The mill cut-out in 1936. Boise Cascade bought the mill in 1966.
