= Bethel, Natchitoches Parish, Louisiana =

Bethel
- Unincorporated community
- Location within the state of Louisiana
- Coordinates: 31°47′22″N 93°03′05″W
- Country: United States
- State: Louisiana
- Parish: Natchitoches
- Elevation: 118 ft (36 m)
- Time zone: UTC-6 (Central (CST))
  - Summer (DST): UTC-5 (CDT)
- ZIP code: 71457
- GNIS feature ID: 542986

Bethel is an unincorporated community in Natchitoches Parish, Louisiana, United States. It is located near the Cane River dam on Herman Taylor Road, northeast of the city of Natchitoches. Local waterways include the Cane River and Red River of the South. The community is home to the Old Bethel Baptist Church, which is over 175 years old.

The community is part of the Natchitoches Micropolitan Statistical Area.
