= Readhimer, Louisiana =

Readhimer
- Unincorporated community
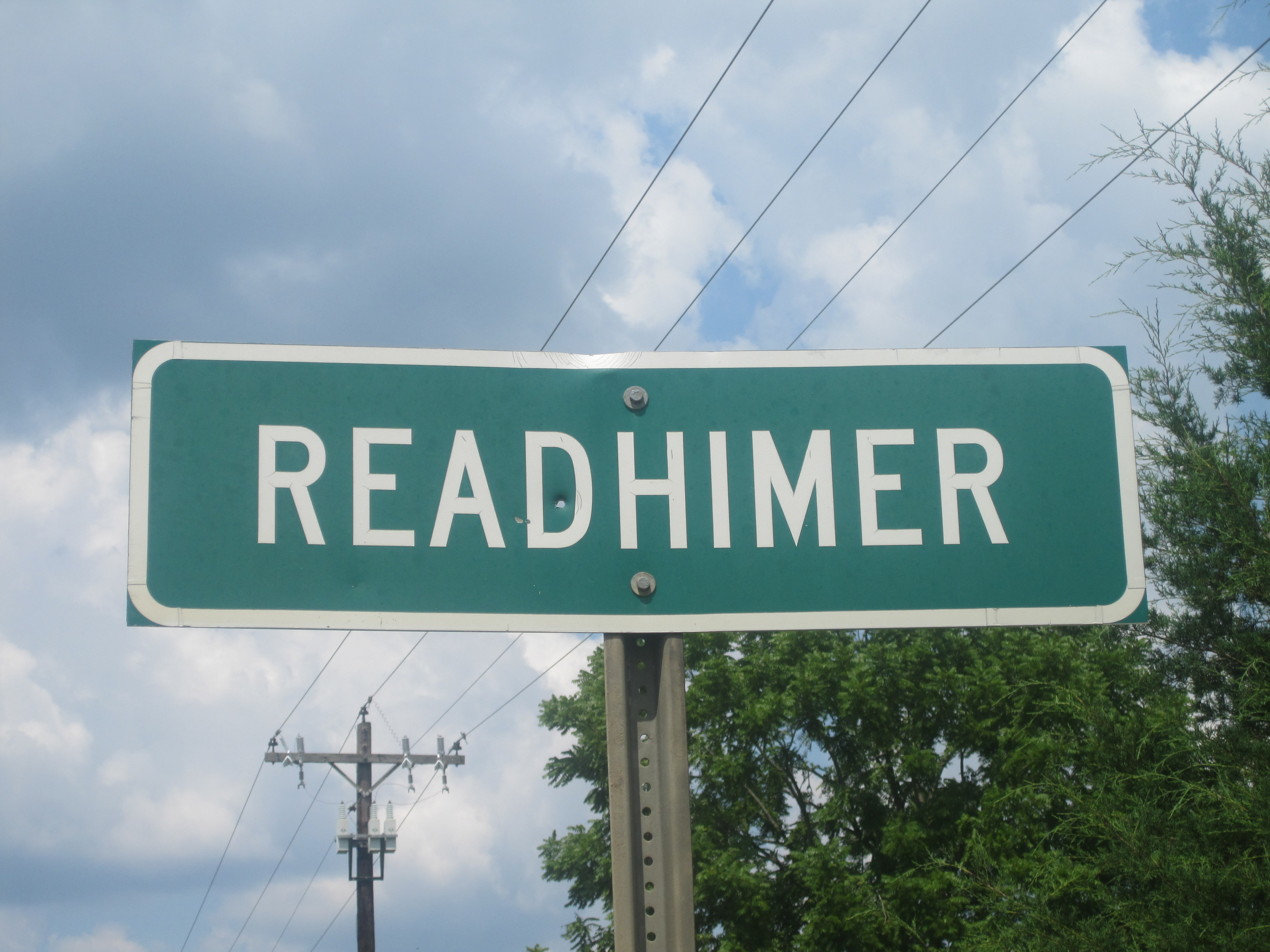
- Readhimer road sign

- Location within the state of Louisiana
- Coordinates: 32°6′56″N 92°59′15″W
- Country: United States
- State: Louisiana
- Parish: Natchitoches
- Time zone: UTC-6 (Central (CST))
  - Summer (DST): UTC-5 (CDT)
- GNIS feature ID: 555761

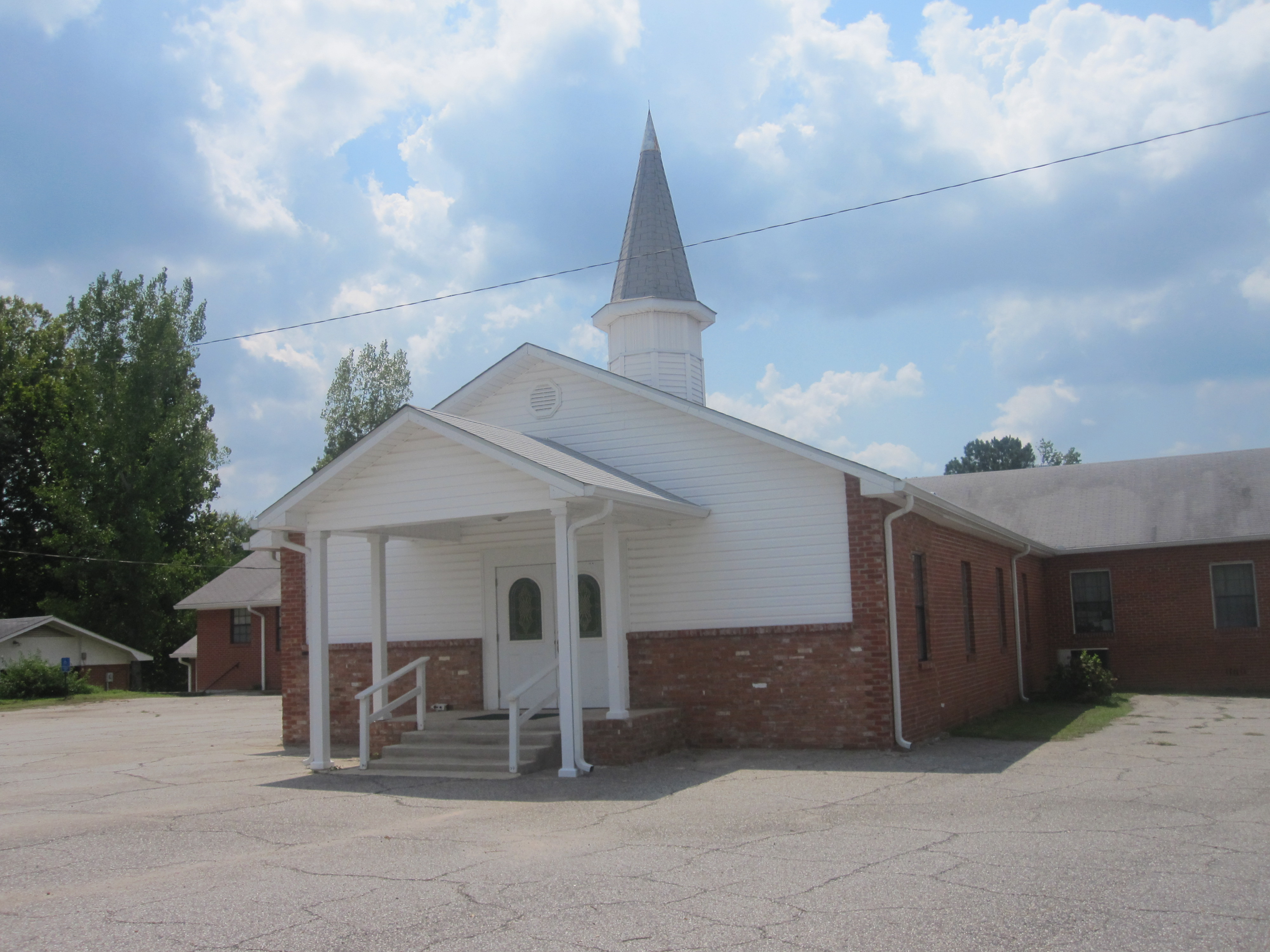
Briarwood Baptist Church in Readhimer

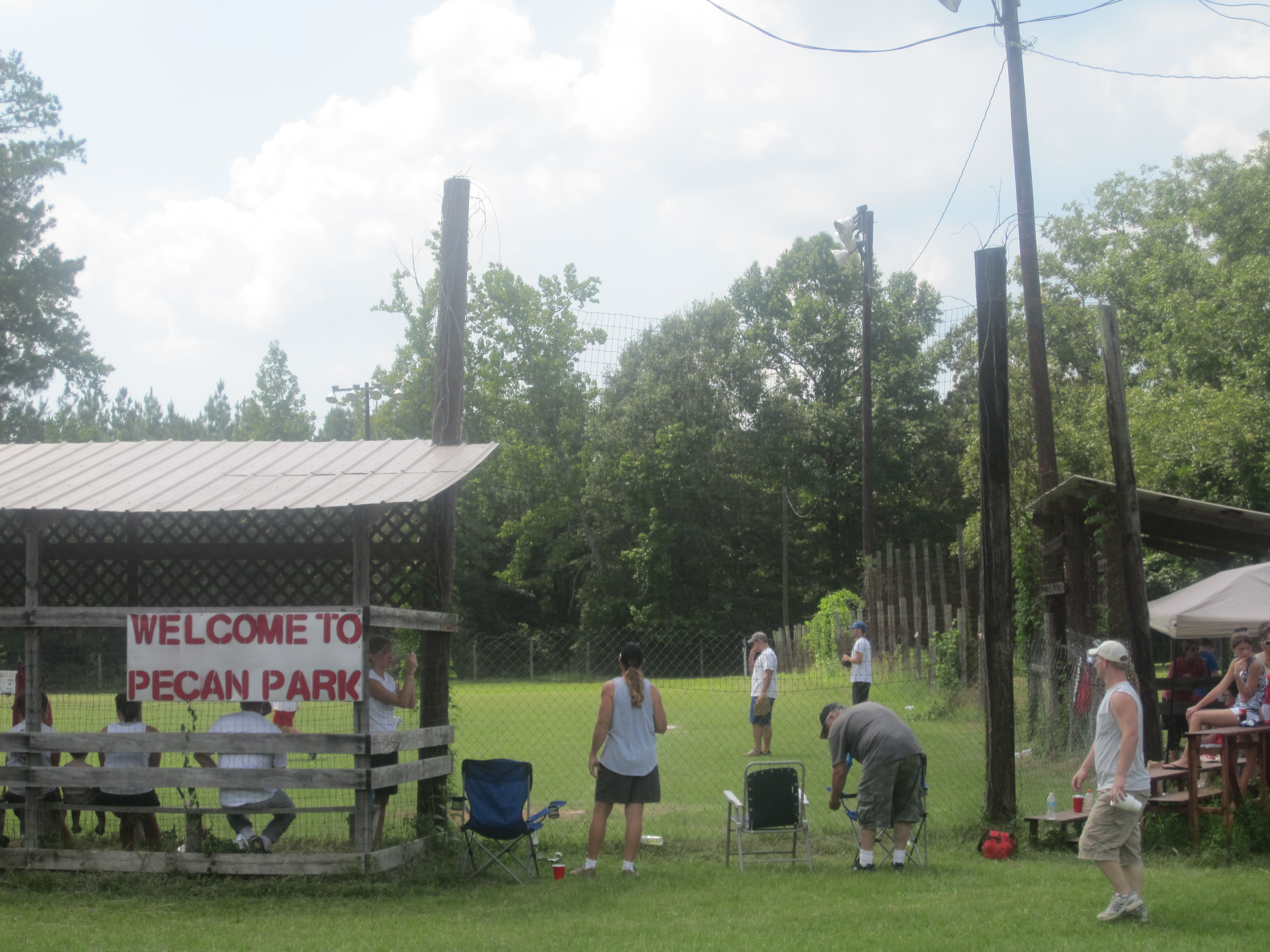
Pecan Park athletic field south of Readhimer

Readhimer is an unincorporated community in Natchitoches Parish, Louisiana, United States.

The community is part of the Natchitoches Micropolitan Statistical Area. It is located within the Chestnut-Readhimer Water System. Readhimer is east of Ashland and northwest of Goldonna.

== Notable people ==
- Roy Sanders
