= Mora, Louisiana =

- Unincorporated community
- Location within Louisiana Location within the United States
- Coordinates: 31°22′24″N 92°56′53″W
- Country: United States
- State: Louisiana
- Parish: Natchitoches
- Elevation: 289 ft (88 m)
- Time zone: UTC-6 (Central (CST))
  - Summer (DST): UTC-5 (CDT)
- ZIP code: 71455
- Area code: 318
- GNIS feature ID: 547734

Mora is an unincorporated community in Natchitoches Parish, Louisiana, United States. Its ZIP code is 71455.
