= Natchitoches Parish, Louisiana =

Parish in Louisiana, United States

Coordinates: 31.73°N 93.10°W

- Parish
- Parish of Natchitoches; Paroisse des Natchitoches (French)
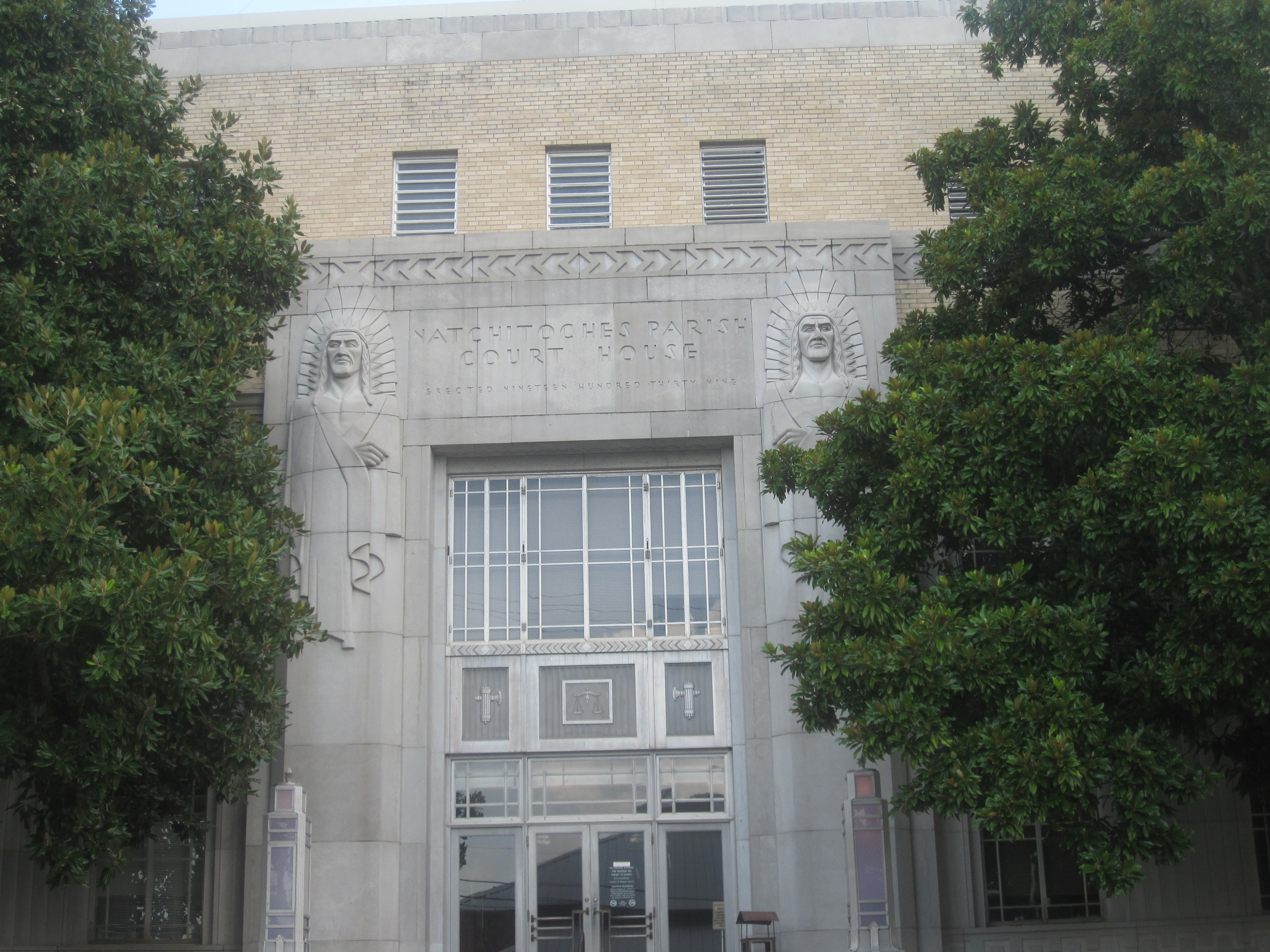
- Natchitoches Parish Courthouse (completed 1939 as a WPA project)

- Flag Seal

- Location within the U.S. state of Louisiana

- Louisiana's location within the U.S.
- Country: United States
- State: Louisiana
- Region: Central Louisiana
- Founded: April 10, 1805; 221 years ago
- Named for: Natchitoches people
- Parish seat: Natchitoches
- Largest municipality: Ashland (area); Natchitoches (population); Campti (population density)
- Incorporated municipalities: 9 (total): 1 city, 1 town, and 7 villages; (located entirely or partially within parish boundaries)

Area
  - Total: 1,299 sq mi (3,360 km^{2})
  - Land: 1,252 sq mi (3,240 km^{2})
  - Water: 47 sq mi (120 km^{2})
  - percentage: 3.6 sq mi (9.3 km^{2})

Population (2020)
  - Total: 37,515
  - Estimate (2025): 36,089 ▼
  - Rank: LA: 30th
  - Density: 29.96/sq mi (11.57/km^{2})
- Time zone: UTC-6 (CST)
  - Summer (DST): UTC-5 (CDT)
- Area code: 318
- Congressional district: 6th
- Website: Natchitoches Parish Government

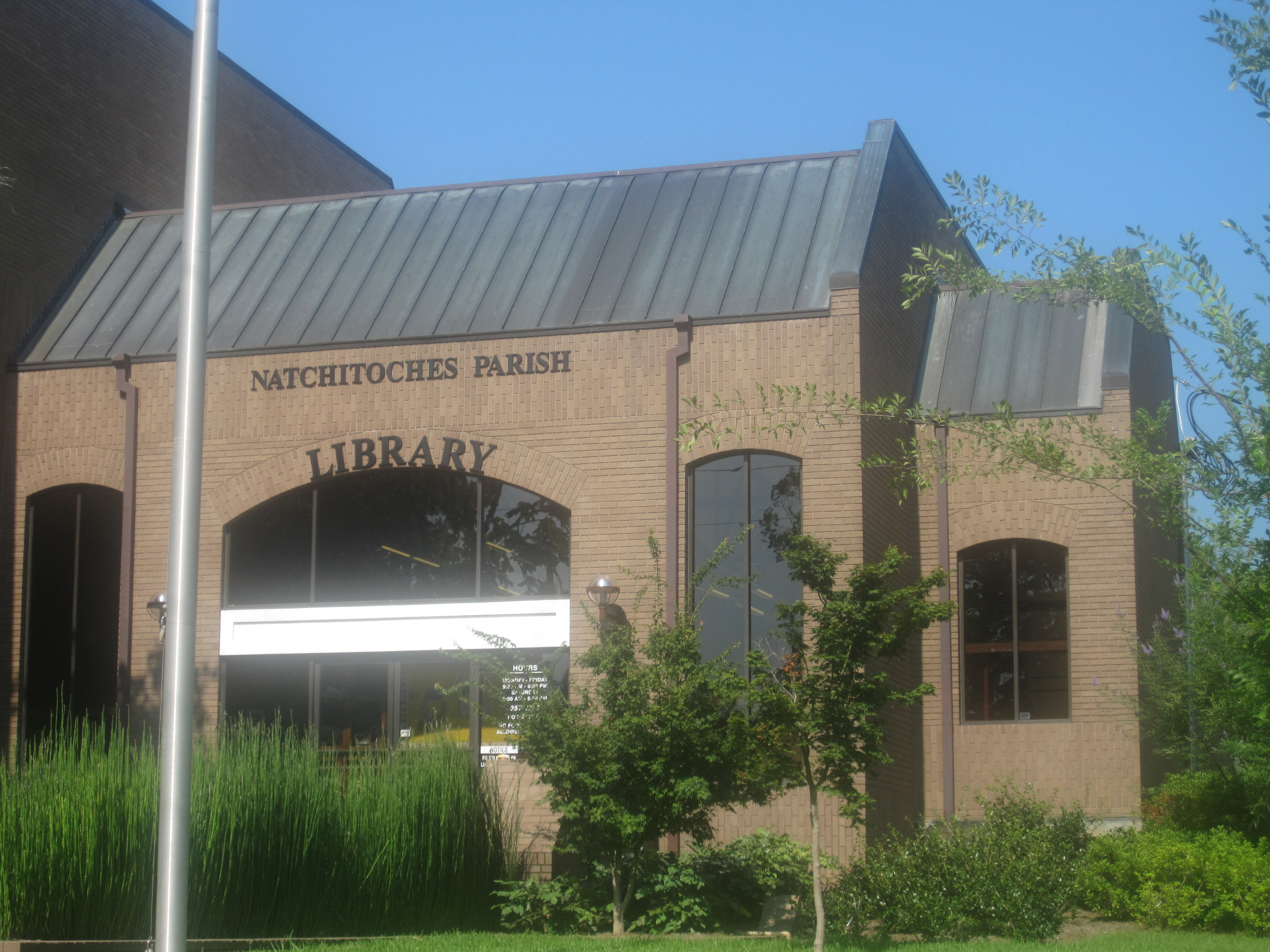
The Natchitoches Parish Library.

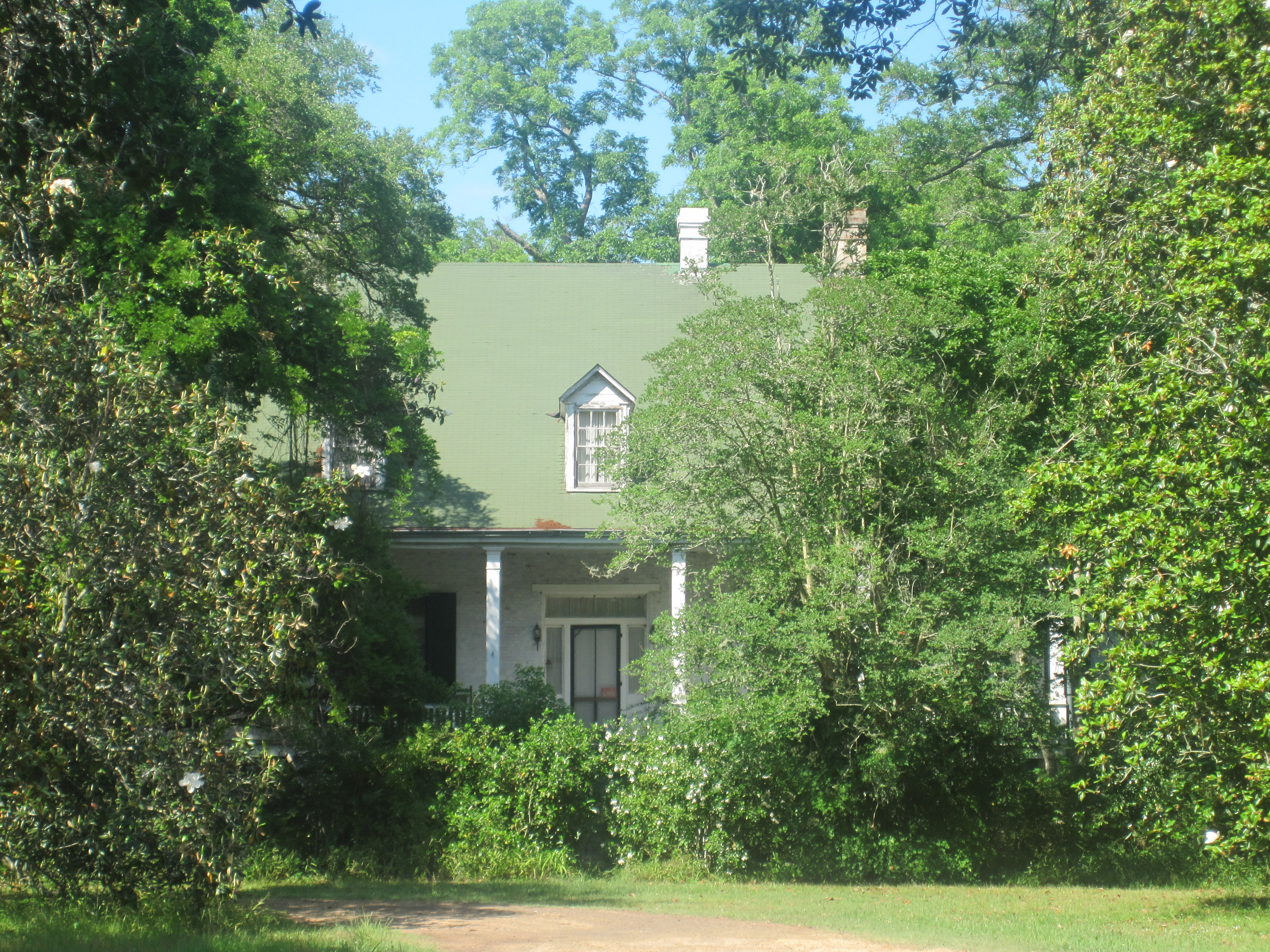
Hidden by trees, the Magnolia Plantation is located in the Cane River Creole National Historical Park.

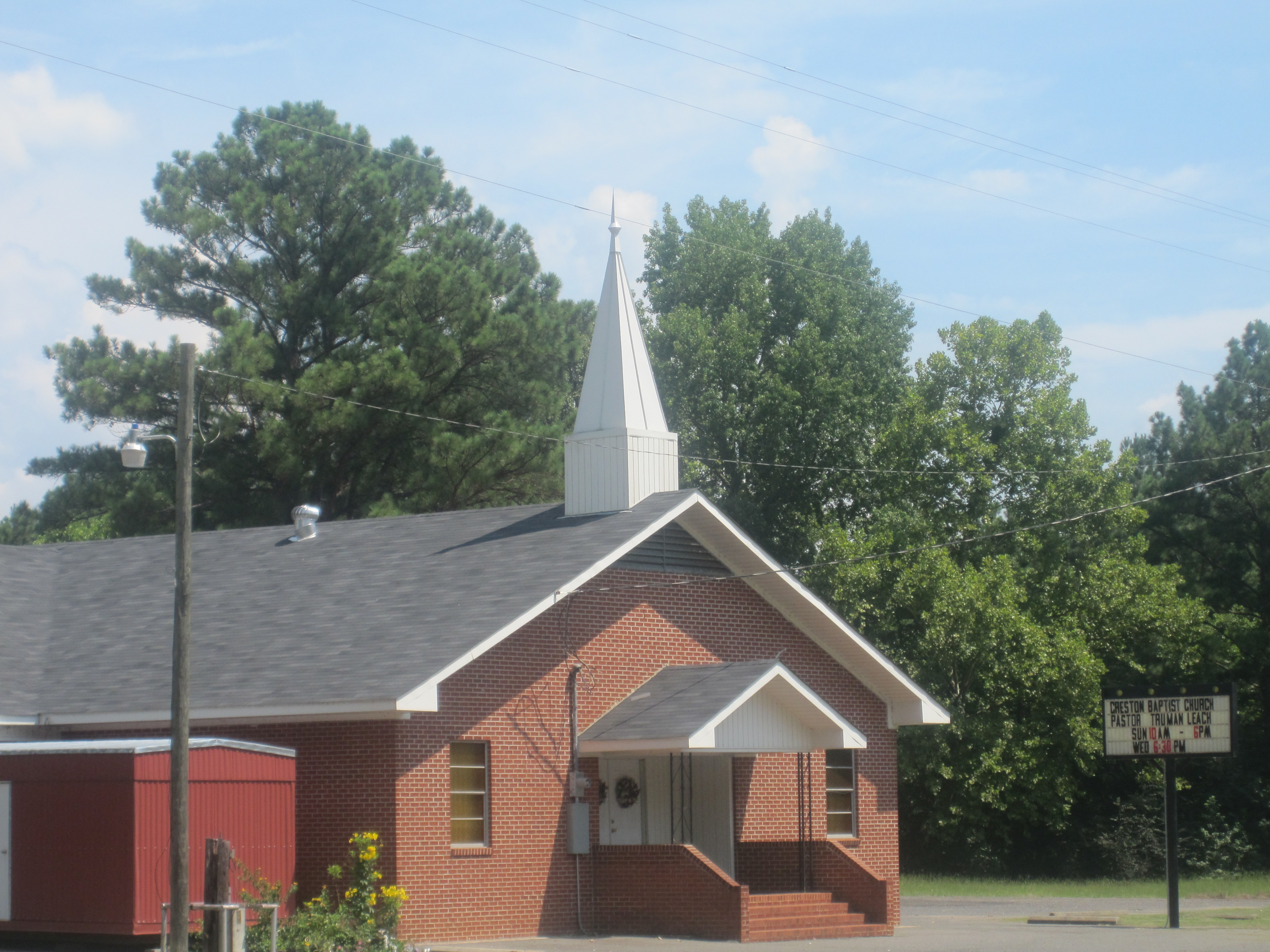
Creston Baptist Church is located at the intersections of the highways leading to Ashland, Goldonna, and Readhimer.

Natchitoches Parish (French: Paroisse des Natchitoches or Les Natchitoches) is a parish located in the U.S. state of Louisiana. As of the 2020 census, the population was 37,515. The parish seat and most populous municipality is Natchitoches, the largest by land area is Ashland, and the most densely populated area is Campti. The parish was formed in 1805.

The Natchitoches, LA Micropolitan Statistical Area includes all of Natchitoches Parish. This is the heart of the Cane River Louisiana Creole community, free people of color of mixed-race descent who settled here in the antebellum period. Their descendants continue to be Catholic and many are still French-speaking. The Cane River National Heritage Area includes the parish. Among the numerous significant historic sites in the parish is the St. Augustine Parish (Isle Brevelle) Church, a destination on the Louisiana African American Heritage Trail, founded in 2008.

Including extensive outbuildings at Magnolia and Oakland plantations, the Cane River Creole National Historical Park interprets the history and culture of the Louisiana Creoles. It is also on the Heritage Trail.

== History ==
In colonial days, "The settlement extended from Natchitoches down to Twenty-four Mile Ferry in 1812. An Indian trail extended from Natchitoches across Rigolette de Bon Dieu, at Petit Ecore, thence across the country to Natchez. This old trail passed by Choctaw Springs, south-east of Montgomery, two very large springs on the site of Frazier's old saw mill. This was the camping place for soldiers, French and Spanish."

Natchitoches Parish was created by the act of April 10, 1805, that divided the Territory of Orleans into 12 parishes, including Orleans, Iberville, Rapides and Natchitoches. The parish boundaries were much larger than now defined, but were gradually reduced as new parishes were organized following population increases in the state. The parishes of Caddo, Claiborne, Bossier, Webster, DeSoto, Bienville, Jackson, Sabine, Red River, Winn, and Grant were eventually formed from Natchitoches' enormous territory. Natchitoches Parish has had fifteen border revisions, making it second only to Ouachita parish in number of boundary revisions.

During the antebellum period, numerous large cotton plantations were developed in this area, worked by enslaved African Americans. The parish population was majority black and enslaved by the time of the Civil War. There was also a large mixed-race population of free Creoles of color. Among the institutions they founded was the St. Augustine Parish (Isle Brevelle) Church, built in 1829. It is a destination on the Louisiana African American Heritage Trail.

In May 1861, free men of color in the area known as Isle Brevelle began to organize two militia companies. Other free men of color of Campti and that area enlisted in the Confederate Army later in the war; and it is believed that they were accepted into a predominately white company because of their longstanding acceptance in the community. Many of the free people of color were related to longtime white families in the parish, who acknowledged them.

After the war, during Reconstruction and after, there was white violence against freedmen and their sympathizers blacks in the aftermath of emancipation and establishing a free labor system. Most planters continued to rely on cotton as a commodity crop, although the market declined, adding to area problems. In the late 19th century, a timber industry developed in some areas.

Since the late 20th century, the parish has developed considerable heritage tourism. It also attracts people for fishing and other sports, including spring training on Cane River Lake by several university teams.

== Geography ==
According to the U.S. Census Bureau, the parish has a total area of 1,299 square miles (3,360 km^{2}), of which 1,252 square miles (3,240 km^{2}) is land and 47 square miles (120 km^{2}) (3.6%) is water. It is the fourth-largest parish by land area in Louisiana. The primary groundwater resources of Natchitoches Parish, from near surface to deepest, include the Red River alluvial, upland terrace, Sparta, and Carrizo-Wilcox aquifers.

== Adjacent parishes ==
- Bienville Parish (north)
- Winn Parish (northeast)
- Grant Parish (east)
- Rapides Parish (southeast)
- Vernon Parish (south)
- Sabine Parish (west)
- De Soto Parish (northwest)
- Red River Parish (northwest)

=== Major highways ===
- Interstate 49
- U.S. Highway 71
- U.S. Highway 84
- Louisiana Highway 1
- Louisiana Highway 6
- Louisiana Highway 9
- Louisiana Highway 117
- Louisiana Highway 118
- Louisiana Highway 119
- Louisiana Highway 120
- Louisiana Highway 126
- Louisiana Highway 153
- Louisiana Highway 155
- Louisiana Highway 156
- Louisiana Highway 174
- Louisiana Highway 478
- Louisiana Highway 479
- Louisiana Highway 480
- Louisiana Highway 484
- Louisiana Highway 485
- Louisiana Highway 486
- Louisiana Highway 487
- Louisiana Highway 490
- Louisiana Highway 491
- Louisiana Highway 493
- Louisiana Highway 494
- Louisiana Highway 495
- Louisiana Highway 504
- Louisiana Highway 1220
- Louisiana Highway 1222
- Louisiana Highway 1223
- Louisiana Highway 1224
- Louisiana Highway 1225
- Louisiana Highway 1226
- Louisiana Highway 1227
- Louisiana Highway 1265
- Louisiana Highway 3163
- Louisiana Highway 3191
- Louisiana Highway 3278
- Louisiana Highway 3279

== National protected areas ==
Name
Cane River Creole National Historical Park
Kisatchie National Forest (part)
Red River National Wildlife Refuge (part)
Saline Bayou

== Demographics ==
Historical population
Census	Pop.	Note	%±
1820	7,486		—
1830	7,905		5.6%
1840	14,350		81.5%
1850	14,228		−0.9%
1860	16,699		17.4%
1870	18,265		9.4%
1880	19,707		7.9%
1890	25,836		31.1%
1900	33,216		28.6%
1910	36,455		9.8%
1920	38,602		5.9%
1930	38,477		−0.3%
1940	40,997		6.5%
1950	38,144		−7.0%
1960	35,653		−6.5%
1970	35,219		−1.2%
1980	39,863		13.2%
1990	36,689		−8.0%
2000	39,080		6.5%
2010	39,566		1.2%
2020	37,515		−5.2%
2025 (est.)	36,089	▼	−3.8%
U.S. Decennial Census; 1790-1960 1900-1990; 1990-2000 2010

=== Racial and ethnic composition ===
Natchitoches Parish, Louisiana – Racial and ethnic composition Note: the US Census treats Hispanic/Latino as an ethnic category. This table excludes Latinos from the racial categories and assigns them to a separate category. Hispanics/Latinos may be of any race.
Race / Ethnicity (NH = Non-Hispanic)	Pop 1980	Pop 1990	Pop 2000	Pop 2010	Pop 2020	% 1980	% 1990	% 2000	% 2010	% 2020
White alone (NH)	24,612	22,053	22,357	21,109	18,898	61.74%	60.11%	57.21%	53.35%	50.37%
Black or African American alone (NH)	14,130	13,706	14,917	16,296	14,857	35.45%	37.36%	38.17%	41.19%	39.60%
Native American or Alaska Native alone (NH)	124	165	393	340	284	0.31%	0.45%	1.01%	0.86%	0.76%
Asian alone (NH)	90	145	171	134	166	0.23%	0.40%	0.44%	0.34%	0.44%
Native Hawaiian or Pacific Islander alone (NH)	x	x	6	8	19	x	x	0.02%	0.02%	0.05%
Other race alone (NH)	152	133	227	201	301	0.38%	0.36%	0.58%	0.51%	0.80%
Mixed race or Multiracial (NH)	x	x	443	743	1,500	x	x	1.13%	1.88%	4.00%
Hispanic or Latino (any race)	755	487	566	735	1,490	1.89%	1.33%	1.45%	1.86%	3.97%
Total	39,863	36,689	39,080	39,566	37,515	100.00%	100.00%	100.00%	100.00%	100.00%

=== 2020 census ===
As of the 2020 census, there were 37,515 people, 15,213 households, and 7,538 families residing in the parish. The median age was 37.3 years; 21.8% of residents were under the age of 18 and 17.7% of residents were 65 years of age or older. For every 100 females there were 93.4 males, and for every 100 females age 18 and over there were 90.1 males age 18 and over.

The racial makeup of the parish was 51.6% White, 39.8% Black or African American, 0.9% American Indian and Alaska Native, 0.5% Asian, 0.1% Native Hawaiian and Pacific Islander, 2.1% from some other race, and 5.0% from two or more races. Hispanic or Latino residents of any race comprised 4.0% of the population. 50.5% of residents lived in urban areas, while 49.5% lived in rural areas.

There were 15,213 households in the parish, of which 28.7% had children under the age of 18 living in them. Of all households, 36.2% were married-couple households, 20.8% were households with a male householder and no spouse or partner present, and 37.1% were households with a female householder and no spouse or partner present. About 34.1% of all households were made up of individuals and 13.0% had someone living alone who was 65 years of age or older.

There were 18,513 housing units, of which 17.8% were vacant. Among occupied housing units, 60.1% were owner-occupied and 39.9% were renter-occupied. The homeowner vacancy rate was 1.9% and the rental vacancy rate was 12.6%.

=== 2010 census ===
As of the 2010 census, there were 39,566 people living in the parish. Of its population in 2010, 54.3% were White, 41.4% Black or African American, 1.0% Native American, 0.3% Asian, 0.9% of some other race and 2.1% of two or more races; 1.9% were Hispanic or Latino (of any race).

=== 2000 census ===
As of the census of 2000, there were 39,080 people, 14,263 households, and 9,499 families living in the parish. The population density was 31 people per square mile (12 people/km^{2}). There were 16,890 housing units at an average density of 14 per square mile (5.4/km^{2}). In 2000, its racial makeup was 57.85% White, 38.43% Black or African American, 1.08% Native American, 0.44% Asian, 0.02% Pacific Islander, 0.92% from other races, and 1.27% from two or more races; 1.45% of the population were Hispanic or Latino of any race. In 2000, there were 14,263 households, out of which 33.00% had children under the age of 18 living with them, 45.30% were married couples living together, 17.70% had a female householder with no husband present, and 33.40% were non-families. 27.10% of all households were made up of individuals, and 10.90% had someone living alone who was 65 years of age or older. The average household size was 2.56 and the average family size was 3.14. In the parish the population was spread out, with 26.00% under the age of 18, 17.90% from 18 to 24, 24.30% from 25 to 44, 19.70% from 45 to 64, and 12.10% who were 65 years of age or older. The median age was 30 years. For every 100 females there were 90.60 males. For every 100 females age 18 and over, there were 85.80 males. The median income for a household in the parish was $25,722, and the median income for a family was $32,816. Males had a median income of $29,388 versus $19,234 for females. The per capita income for the parish was $13,743. About 20.90% of families and 26.50% of the population were below the poverty line, including 32.70% of those under age 18 and 19.00% of those age 65 or over.

== Politics ==
Until the late 20th century, Natchitoches Parish was reliably Democratic in most competitive elections. But the party affiliations have changed, and like most of the Deep South, have a distinct ethnic and demographic character. Since African Americans achieved certain gains under civil rights legislation and have been enabled to vote again since the late 1960s, they have supported the Democratic Party. Most white conservatives have left that party, and affiliated with the Republican Party, as has been obvious in parish results in presidential elections since 2000. These results reflect the demographic breakdown of the parish, where whites comprise a slight majority.

The last Democrat to win in Natchitoches Parish at the presidential level was native son of the South, Bill Clinton from Arkansas in 1996, who received 8,296 votes (54.7 percent), compared to Republican Robert J. Dole's 5,471 ballots (36.1 percent). Ross Perot of the Reform Party attracted 1,053 votes (6.9 percent).

United States presidential election results for Natchitoches Parish, Louisiana
Year	Republican		Democratic		Third party(ies)	
Year	No.	%	No.	%	No.	%
1912	21	2.08%	759	75.07%	231	22.85%
1916	45	3.65%	1,181	95.78%	7	0.57%
1920	203	11.29%	1,595	88.71%	0	0.00%
1924	200	14.86%	1,132	84.10%	14	1.04%
1928	526	20.04%	2,099	79.96%	0	0.00%
1932	173	4.76%	3,458	95.18%	2	0.06%
1936	502	12.62%	3,476	87.38%	0	0.00%
1940	684	15.17%	3,824	84.83%	0	0.00%
1944	1,105	30.32%	2,536	69.59%	3	0.08%
1948	763	14.26%	1,692	31.61%	2,897	54.13%
1952	3,104	44.47%	3,876	55.53%	0	0.00%
1956	3,203	55.51%	2,028	35.15%	539	9.34%
1960	2,562	36.29%	2,781	39.39%	1,717	24.32%
1964	5,525	65.00%	2,975	35.00%	0	0.00%
1968	2,352	19.93%	3,945	33.43%	5,505	46.64%
1972	6,994	64.74%	3,180	29.44%	629	5.82%
1976	5,248	42.26%	6,692	53.89%	477	3.84%
1980	6,668	46.99%	7,102	50.05%	419	2.95%
1984	8,836	58.99%	5,806	38.76%	336	2.24%
1988	7,224	52.60%	6,151	44.79%	358	2.61%
1992	5,694	38.53%	6,974	47.19%	2,111	14.28%
1996	5,471	36.06%	8,296	54.69%	1,403	9.25%
2000	7,332	49.35%	6,924	46.60%	601	4.05%
2004	9,261	54.59%	7,398	43.60%	307	1.81%
2008	9,054	53.05%	7,801	45.71%	212	1.24%
2012	9,077	52.60%	7,942	46.02%	239	1.38%
2016	8,968	53.96%	7,144	42.98%	509	3.06%
2020	9,358	56.53%	6,896	41.66%	300	1.81%
2024	9,100	60.51%	5,740	38.16%	200	1.33%

== Education ==
Natchitoches Parish School Board operates local public schools.

Parish Schools:

East Natchitoches Elementary & Middle High School, Fairview Alpha Elementary & Junior High School, Frankie Ray Jackson Sr. Technical Center, Goldonna Elementary & Junior High School, L.P. Vaughn Elementary & Junior High School, Lakeview High School, M.R. Weaver Elementary, Marthaville Elementary & Junior High School, Natchitoches Central High School, Natchitoches Magnet School, NSU Elementary Laboratory School, NSU Middle Laboratory School, and Provencal Elementary & Junior High School.

It is in the service area of Bossier Parish Community College.

== Government ==
Parish Administration	Administrators
President	John Salter
Sheriff	Stuart Wright
Assessor	Timothy K. Page
School Board Superintendent	Grant Eloi

== Communities ==
=== Incorporated communities ===
==== City ====
- Natchitoches (parish seat and most populous municipality)

==== Town ====
- Campti (most densely populated municipality)

==== Villages ====
- Ashland (least density populated municipality and largest by land area)
- Clarence
- Goldonna
- Natchez
- Powhatan (smallest municipality both area and population)
- Provencal
- Robeline

=== Unincorporated areas ===
- Isle Brevelle

==== Census-designated places ====
- Marthaville
- Point Place
- Vienna Bend
- Adai Caddo US Census SDTSA

==== Other communities ====
- Ajax
- Allen
- Bellwood
- Bermuda
- Bethel
- Chestnut
- Chopin
- Cypress
- Cloutierville
- Creston
- Derry
- Fairview Acres
- Fairview Alpha (also in Red River Parish)
- Flora
- Gorum
- Grand Ecore
- Grappes Bluff
- Hagewood
- Irma
- Isle Brevelle
- Janie
- Kile
- King Hill
- Melrose
- Mink
- Mora
- Pleasant Hill
- Readhimer
- Spanish Lake
- Timon
- Victoria
- Vowells Mill

== Native American Tribes ==
- Adai Caddo Indians of Louisiana
- Natchitoches people
- Caddo

== Hospital ==
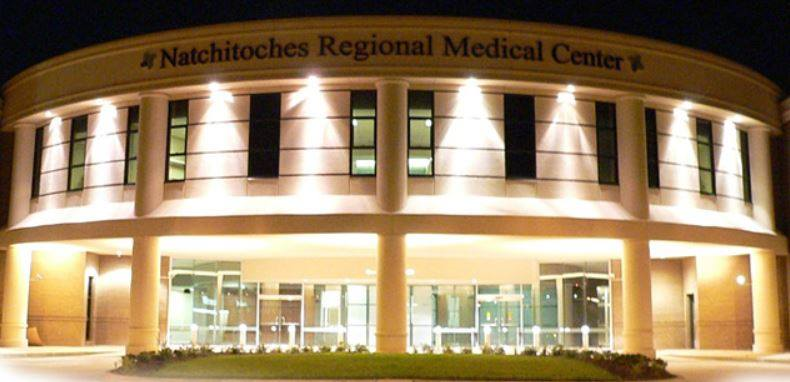
Natchitoches Regional Medical Center in Natchitoches

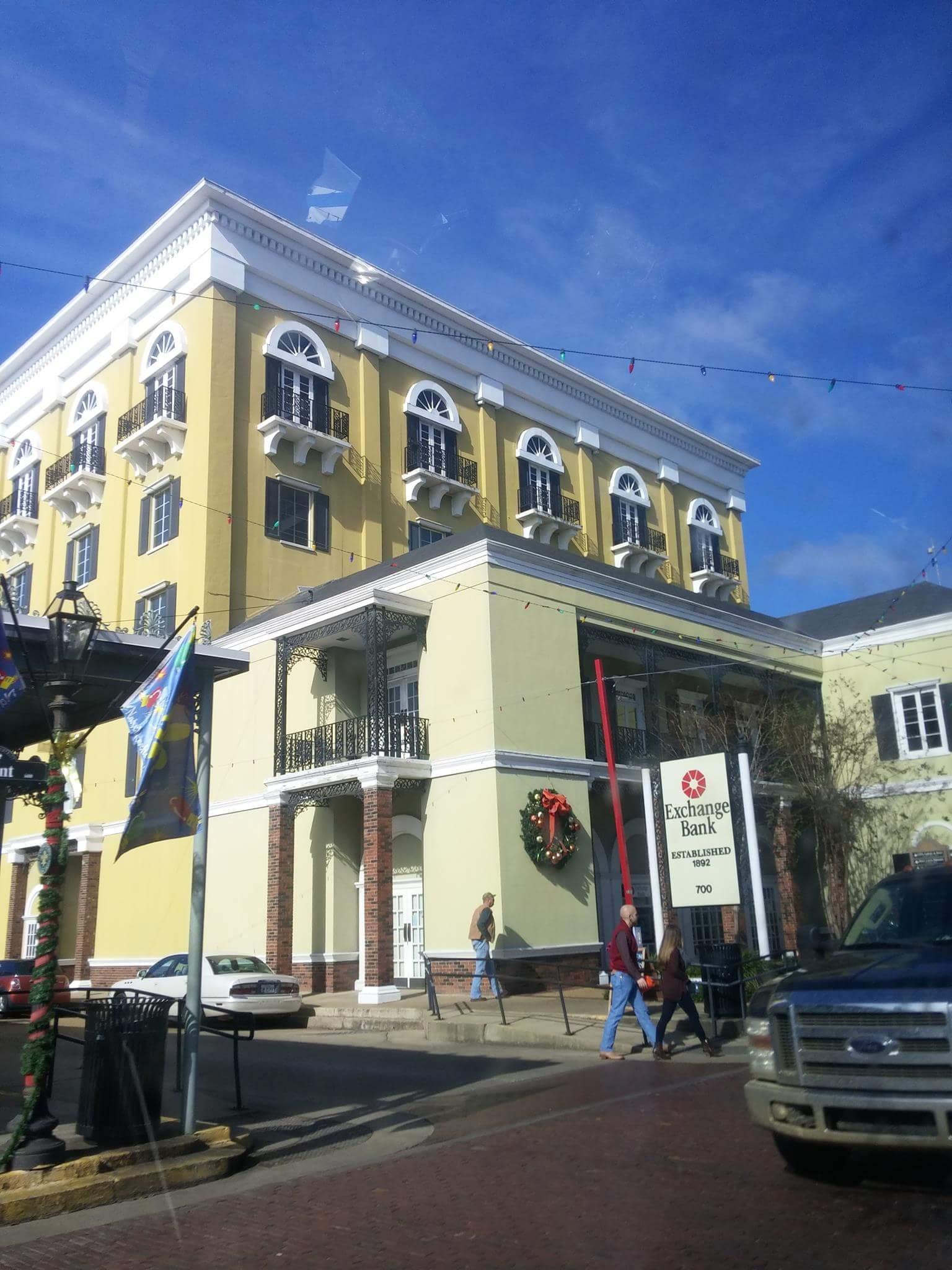
Exchange Bank in Natchitoches is the tallest building in Downtown Natchitoches

- Natchitoches Regional Medical Center (formerly Natchitoches Parish Hospital) owns 96 beds, serving for Natchitoches, Sabine and Winn Parishes.

== Prison ==
Parish

Name	Address	Zip	Aged
Natchitoches Parish Detention Center	299 Edwina Dr., Natchitoches, Louisiana	71457	16+

== Notable people ==
- Curtis Boozman (1898–1979), member of the Louisiana House of Representatives from Natchitoches (two terms: 1952–1956 and 1960–1964).
- Jean Baptiste Brevelle (1698–1754), early 18th century explorer, trader and soldier of Fort Saint Jean Baptiste de Natchitoches. Father of the namesake of Bayou Brevelle and Isle Brevelle.
- Leopold Caspari (1830–1915), merchant in Cloutierville from 1849 to 1858 and thereafter businessman and banker in Natchitoches. He served nonconsecutively in both houses of the Louisiana State Legislature between 1884 and 1914.
- Monnie T. Cheves (1902–1988), Northwestern State University professor; member of the Louisiana House of Representatives from 1952 to 1960
- Charles Milton Cunningham (1877–1936), educator, lawyer, police juror, state senator, editor of The Natchitoches Times
- W. T. Cunningham (1871–1952), planter, lawyer, judge of the 11th Judicial District in Natchitoches and Red River parishes, member of the Louisiana House of Representatives from 1908 to 1912, born in Natchitoches Parish in 1871
- Numa T. Delouche (1888–1965), member of the Louisiana House of Representatives from Cloutierville from 1944 to 1948, served alongside Sylvan Friedman of Natchez, Louisiana.
- Caroline Dormon (1888–1971), naturalist, botanist, and preservationist; born and lived on her family estate of Briarwood in Natchitoches Parish.
- Anne des Cadeaux Brevelle (unknown-1754), Adai Caddo Native American woman and early settler of Natchitoches. Devout Catholic and mother to the famed explorer of New France, Jean Baptiste Brevelle II, who is the namesake of Isle Brevelle.
- Abraham Dowden, Democratic political figure.
- Brothers J. Isaac Friedman (1877–1949) and Leon Friedman (1886–1948) served in the Louisiana House from 1908 to 1916 and 1932 to 1940, respectively. Isaac Friedman also completed two years of a term in the state senate (1922 to 1924), following the resignation of Charles Milton Cunningham. Their nephew, Sylvan Friedman was a member of both houses of the state legislature, serving in the House from 1944 to 1952, and the state senate from 1952 to 1972. The Friedmans came from a large Jewish landholding family in Natchez, Louisiana.
- Thomas Gilcrease (1890–1962), born in Robeline. He moved as a child with his parents in 1899 to the community of Wealaka in the Creek Nation in Indian Territory, now eastern Oklahoma. Later an oilman and an art collector, he founded the Gilcrease Museum, which he later donated to Tulsa.
- Lloyd Hendrick (1908–1951), member of the state senate for DeSoto and Caddo parishes, 1940 to 1948; born in Natchitoches Parish.
- Andrew R. Johnson (1856–1933), Louisiana state senator and former mayor of Homer, Louisiana, in 1901 named and sold lots to establish the village of Ashland in Natchitoches Parish.
- Ray Tarver (1921–1972), dentist from Natchitoches who represented Natchitoches Parish in the Louisiana House from 1964 to 1968; reared in Hagewood community in Natchitoches Parish

== See also ==
- National Register of Historic Places listings in Natchitoches Parish, Louisiana
- Bayou Brevelle
- Sabine River Spanish – Spanish variety spoken in Texas and Louisiana
- Cane River
- Isle Brevelle
- Creole
- Adai Caddo Indians of Louisiana
- St. Augustine Parish (Isle Brevelle) Church
