= Abraham Dowden =

American politician

Abraham Rinkle Dowden (/ˈdaʊdən/; February 14, 1839 – September 18, 1907) was a minor Democratic political figure in Natchitoches Parish, Louisiana, in the late-19th and early-20th centuries. He was Postmaster of the Fourth Class Post Office in Kisatchie, Louisiana, from 1887 to 1891.^{3} He was known by "A.R." for most of his life.

== Biography ==
Downden was the son of Hugh Dowden. Abraham Dowden married^{1} Louisa Ann Dendy (1840-1934^{9}) in Kisatchie, Louisiana^{1} on December 23, 1856^{1}. He was 17 years old, she was 16. Conducting the ceremony was Rev. Edmund Duggan^{1} of Many, LA.^{1}

The first child of A.R. and Louisa, known only as "Son" Dowden, was born in and died in 1858. Usually, in that area, children buried unnamed had been stillborn or died at childbirth. The second son, Francis Marion (later "Bridge") Dowden was born September 6, 1860. The third son. Thomas Jefferson Dowden, was born February 14, 1862. These and subsequent children were all born in Kisatchie. LA.

He enlisted in Co. E^{1}, Sabine Guards^{4}, 11th Louisiana Infantry^{1}, on May 14^{4}, 1862^{1} in Many, Louisiana^{4} during the American Civil War. He was a couple of weeks shy of his 24th birthday.

James Andrew Dowden, the eldest brother, served in Co. H, later M, 12th Louisiana Infantry under Capt. B.D. Owens. He enlisted August 18, 1861, at Camp Moore, LA. (Other undocumented sources say he enlisted 26 Jul 1861.) The unit was sent by rail to Union City, Tennessee and from there marched to Columbus, KY on Sept. 3, 1861. They remained there six months in the construction of earthworks and obstructions along the Mississippi River. They were transferred to Island No (source illegible) in March, 1862, after the fall of Ft. Danetson made their position untenable. After two weeks, the regiment sent on garrison duty at Ft. Pillow, Tennessee, for three months. James Andrew died at Ft. Pillow, TN May 6, 1862, exactly two years after his marriage to Narcissa Amarylla Davis (1841-1862). Likely, he died from typhoid fever, as the 12th was hit severely by typhoid during its sojourn at Ft. Pillow.

Shelton Powell Dowden, the second-oldest of Hugh Dowden's five sons, was a bachelor all his life. He was listed^{6} as a 20-year-old farm laborer^{6} in the household of Elijah and Louisa A Self^{6} prior to his enlistment in Company C, 12th Louisiana Infantry. Shelton never returned from the war. He was presumed killed in action. The Muster Roll of his unit states that he was "absent at hospital since Sept. 25, 1862" in Bolivar, TN.^{7}

A.R.'s 11th Louisiana Regiment was combined with the 16th Louisiana Infantry and the Crescent Regiment to form the Consolidated Crescent Regiment on November 3, 1863, in Simmesport, Louisiana. Dowden rose to the rank of sergeant during the war. The Consolidated Crescent Regiment was heavily involved in contesting Union General Nathaniel Banks' Red River Campaign. At the Battle of Mansfield, Louisiana, on April 8, 1864, the unit took more than 175 casualties and was the only Louisiana unit to lose all three field officers in a single battle. Among the casualties were Dowden's brother-in-law, Corporal Thomas J. Dendy, who was killed, and his brother, Sergeant Stephen Grant Dowden, who was wounded. The Consolidated Crescent Regiment surrendered with the Confederate Army of the Trans-Mississippi on May 26, 1865. Dowden was paroled on June 8, 1865, and returned home to Natchitoches Parish.

He became active in local politics later in life, and was serving on the Natchitoches Parish Police Jury at the time of his death. His death was reportedly due to "rheumatism and kidney Trouble."^{1}
