= Point Place, Louisiana =

Point Place
- Census-designated place
- Hamlet of Point Place
- Location within Louisiana Location within the United States
- Coordinates: 31.6968°N 93.021°W
- Country: United States
- State: Louisiana
- Parish: Natchitoches Parish

Area
  - Total: 1.05 sq mi (2.73 km^{2})
  - Land: 0.97 sq mi (2.52 km^{2})
  - Water: 0.077 sq mi (0.20 km^{2})
- Elevation: 115 ft (35 m)

Population (2020)
  - Total: 382
  - Density: 391.9/sq mi (151.31/km^{2})
- Time zone: UTC-6 (Central)
  - Summer (DST): UTC-5 (Central DST)
- FIPS code: 22-61473

Point Place is an unincorporated community and census-designated place (CDP) in Natchitoches Parish, Louisiana, United States. As of the 2020 census, Point Place had a population of 382.

== Demographics ==
Historical population
Census	Pop.	Note	%±
2010	400		—
2020	382		−4.5%
U.S. Decennial Census

Point Place was first listed as a census designated place in the 2010 U.S. census.
