= Missler, Kansas =

Unincorporated community in Meade County, Kansas

Coordinates: 37°19′04″N 100°26′07″W

Missler is an unincorporated community in Meade County, Kansas, United States.

== History ==
Missler was originally called Jasper, and under the latter name was laid out and platted in May 1888.

A post office in Jasper, established in April 1888, was renamed Missler in 1912, and remained in operation until it closed in 1933.
