= Provencal, Louisiana =

- Village
- Village of Provencal
- Location of Provencal in Natchitoches Parish, Louisiana.

- Location of Louisiana in the United States
- Coordinates: 31°39′15″N 93°12′04″W
- Country: United States
- State: Louisiana
- Parish: Natchitoches

Government
  - Mayor: Dan Gongre

Area
  - Total: 2.46 sq mi (6.38 km^{2})
  - Land: 2.46 sq mi (6.37 km^{2})
  - Water: 0.0039 sq mi (0.01 km^{2})
- Elevation: 171 ft (52 m)

Population (2020)
  - Total: 528
  - Rank: NC: 3rd
  - Density: 214.8/sq mi (82.95/km^{2})
- Time zone: UTC-6 (CST)
  - Summer (DST): UTC-5 (CDT)
- Area code: 318
- FIPS code: 22-62770

Provencal is a village in Natchitoches Parish, Louisiana, United States. As of the 2020 census, Provencal had a population of 528. It is part of the Natchitoches Micropolitan Statistical Area.

== Geography ==
Provencal is near Isle Brevelle and El Camino Real de los Tejas National Historic Trail located at 31°39′15″N 93°12′4″W (31.654131, -93.200984).

According to the United States Census Bureau, the village has a total area of 2.5 square miles (6.4 km^{2}), all land.

== Demographics ==
Historical population
Census	Pop.	Note	%±
1890	482		—
1900	246		−49.0%
1910	262		6.5%
1960	570		—
1970	530		−7.0%
1980	695		31.1%
1990	538		−22.6%
2000	708		31.6%
2010	611		−13.7%
2020	528		−13.6%
2025 (est.)	516	▼	−2.3%
U.S. Decennial Census

=== 2020 census ===
Provencal racial composition
Race	Number	Percentage
White (non-Hispanic)	476	90.15%
Black or African American (non-Hispanic)	5	0.95%
Native American	7	1.33%
Asian	1	0.19%
Other/Mixed	26	4.92%
Hispanic or Latino	13	2.46%

As of the 2020 United States census, there were 528 people, 167 households, and 67 families residing in the village.

=== 2000 census ===
As of the census of 2000, there were 708 people, 273 households, and 200 families residing in the village. The population density was 287.4 inhabitants per square mile (111.0/km^{2}). There were 308 housing units at an average density of 125.0 per square mile (48.3/km^{2}). The racial makeup of the village was 97.60% White, 0.42% African American, 1.13% Native American, 0.28% from other races, and 0.56% from two or more races. 1.27% of the population are Hispanic or Latino of any race.

There were 273 households, out of which 40.3% had children under the age of 18 living with them, 61.5% were married couples living together, 10.3% had a female householder with no husband present, and 26.4% were non-families. 25.3% of all households were made up of individuals, and 13.2% had someone living alone who was 65 years of age or older. The average household size was 2.59 and the average family size was 3.12.

In the village, the population was spread out, with 29.9% under the age of 18, 11.3% from 18 to 24, 25.6% from 25 to 44, 20.9% from 45 to 64, and 12.3% who were 65 years of age or older. The median age was 30 years. For every 100 females, there were 87.8 males. For every 100 females age 18 and over, there were 83.7 males.

The median income for a household in the village was $31,196, and the median income for a family was $32,625. Males had a median income of $31,389 versus $19,625 for females. The per capita income for the village was $14,842. About 7.1% of families and 9.3% of the population were below the poverty line, including 10.0% of those under age 18 and 5.9% of those age 65 or over.

== See also ==
- Anne des Cadeaux
- Natchitoches Parish
- Bayou Brevelle
- Cane River
- El Camino Real de los Tejas National Historic Trail
