= Flora, Louisiana =

Flora
- Unincorporated community
- Location within the state of Louisiana
- Coordinates: 31°36′45″N 93°5′52″W
- Country: United States
- State: Louisiana
- Parish: Natchitoches
- Elevation: 115 ft (35 m)
- Time zone: UTC-6 (Central (CST))
  - Summer (DST): UTC-5 (CDT)
- ZIP code: 71428
- GNIS feature ID: 547366

Flora is an unincorporated community in Natchitoches Parish, Louisiana, United States. It is located near the intersection of Louisiana highways 120 and 478, south of Natchitoches near Isle Brevelle and the El Camino Real de los Tejas National Historic Trail. Local waterways include Old River, Bayou Brevelle and Kisatchie Bayou.

The community is part of the Natchitoches Micropolitan Statistical Area.

== See also ==
- Natchitoches, Louisiana
- Anne des Cadeaux
- Cane River
