= Curtis Boozman =

American politician (1898–1979)

Member of the Louisiana House of Representatives
- In office 1952–1956
- In office 1960–1964

Personal details
- Born: Curtis Earl Boozman; July 24, 1898 Oklahoma, U.S.
- Died: April 22, 1979 (aged 80) Natchitoches Parish, Louisiana, U.S.
- Party: Democratic
- Spouse: Marion Boozman
- Children: 1

Curtis Earl Boozman (July 24, 1898 – April 22, 1979) was an American politician. A member of the Democratic Party, he served in the Louisiana House of Representatives from 1952 to 1956 and again from 1960 to 1964.

== Life and career ==
Boozman was born in Oklahoma, the son of James and Mary Boozman. He served in the United States National Guard at the Mexican border in 1916, and was given the M. C. Gehr Blue Cap Award by the American Legion. He served in the United States Army during World War I.

Boozman served in the Louisiana House of Representatives from 1952 to 1956 and again from 1960 to 1964.

== Death ==
Boozman died on April 22, 1979, at the Natchitoches Parish Hospital in Natchitoches Parish, Louisiana, at the age of 80.
