= Charleston, South Carolina =

City in South Carolina, United States

- City
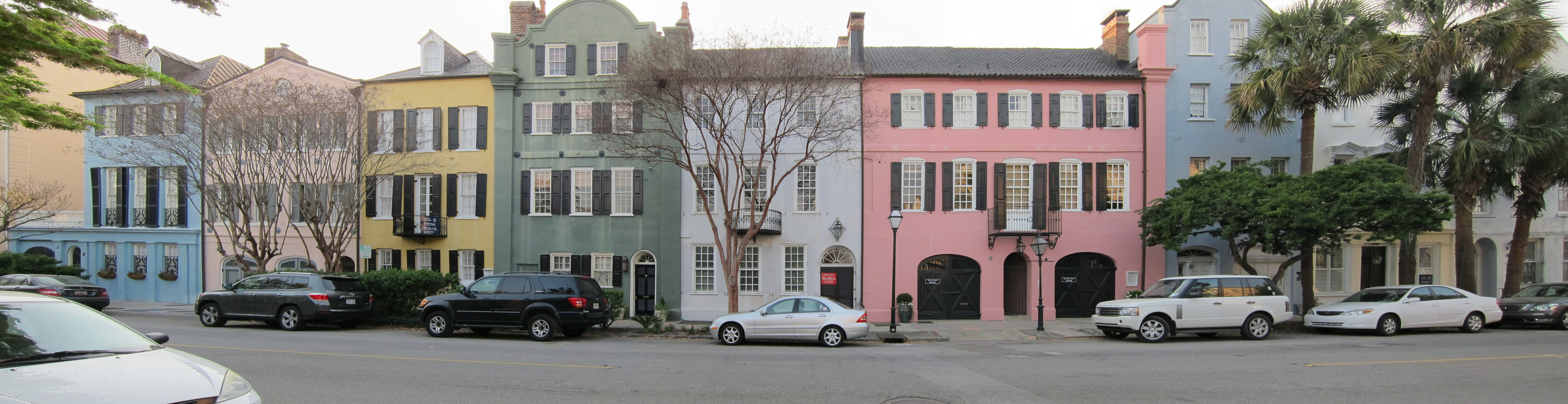
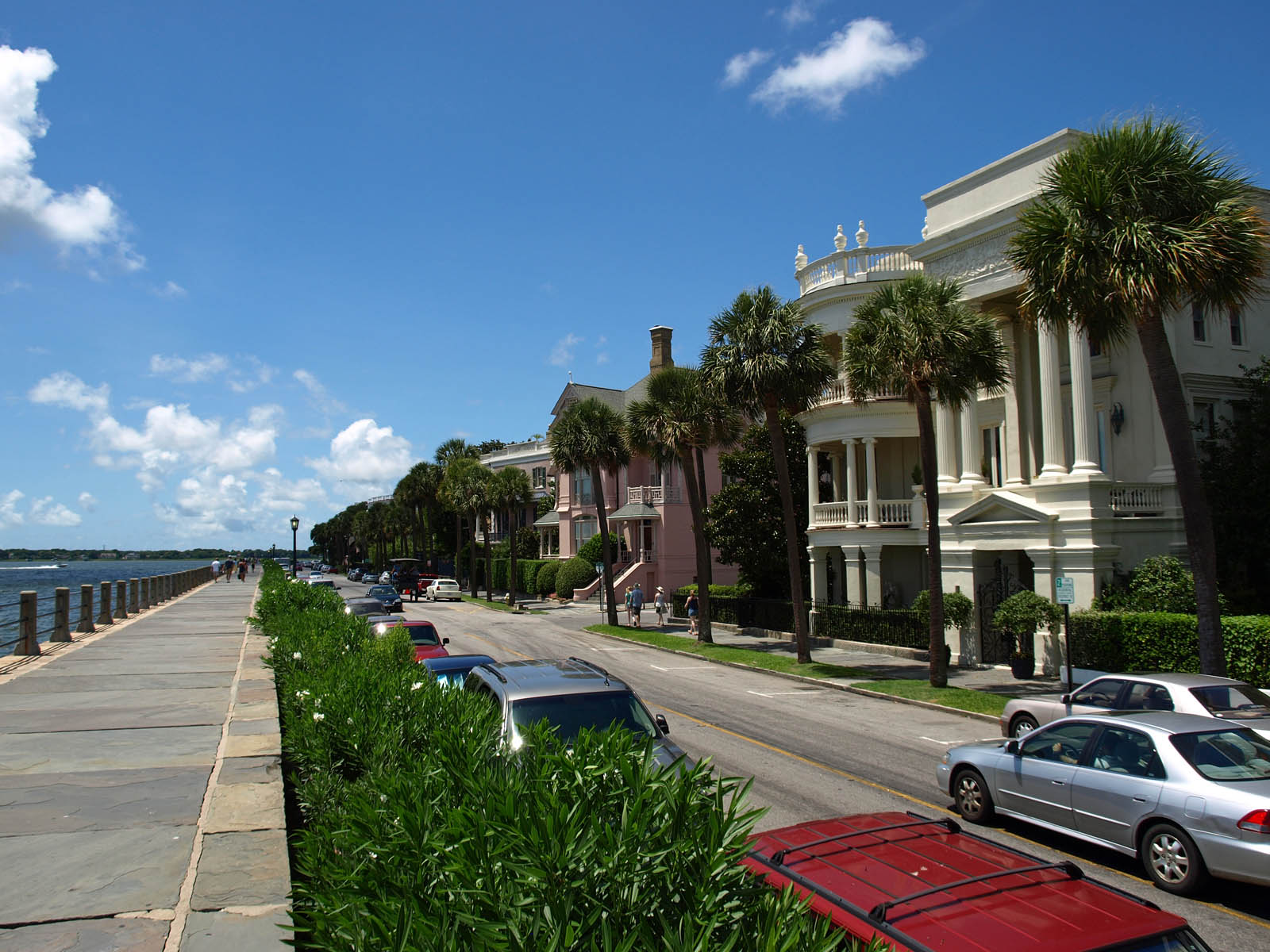
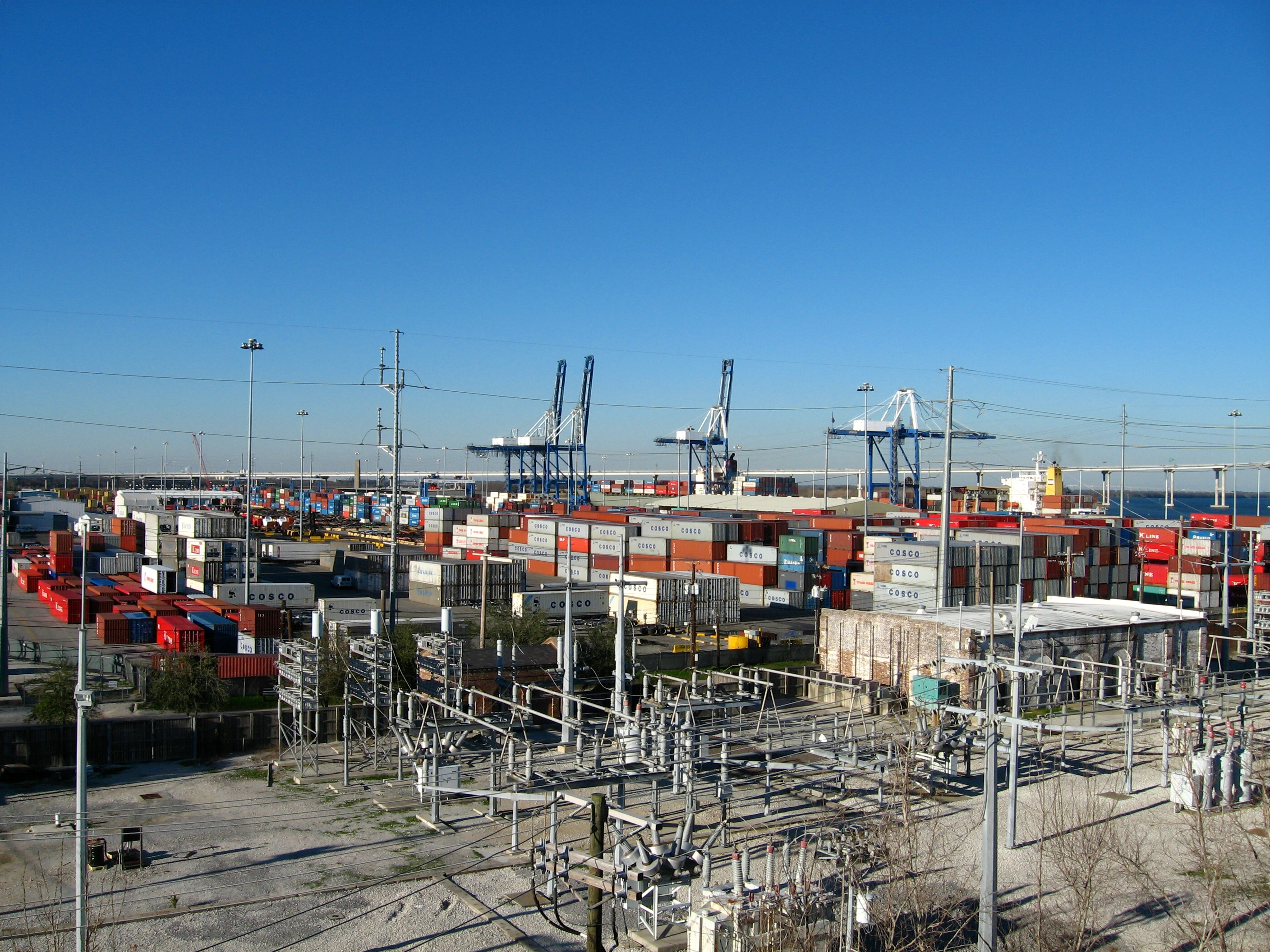
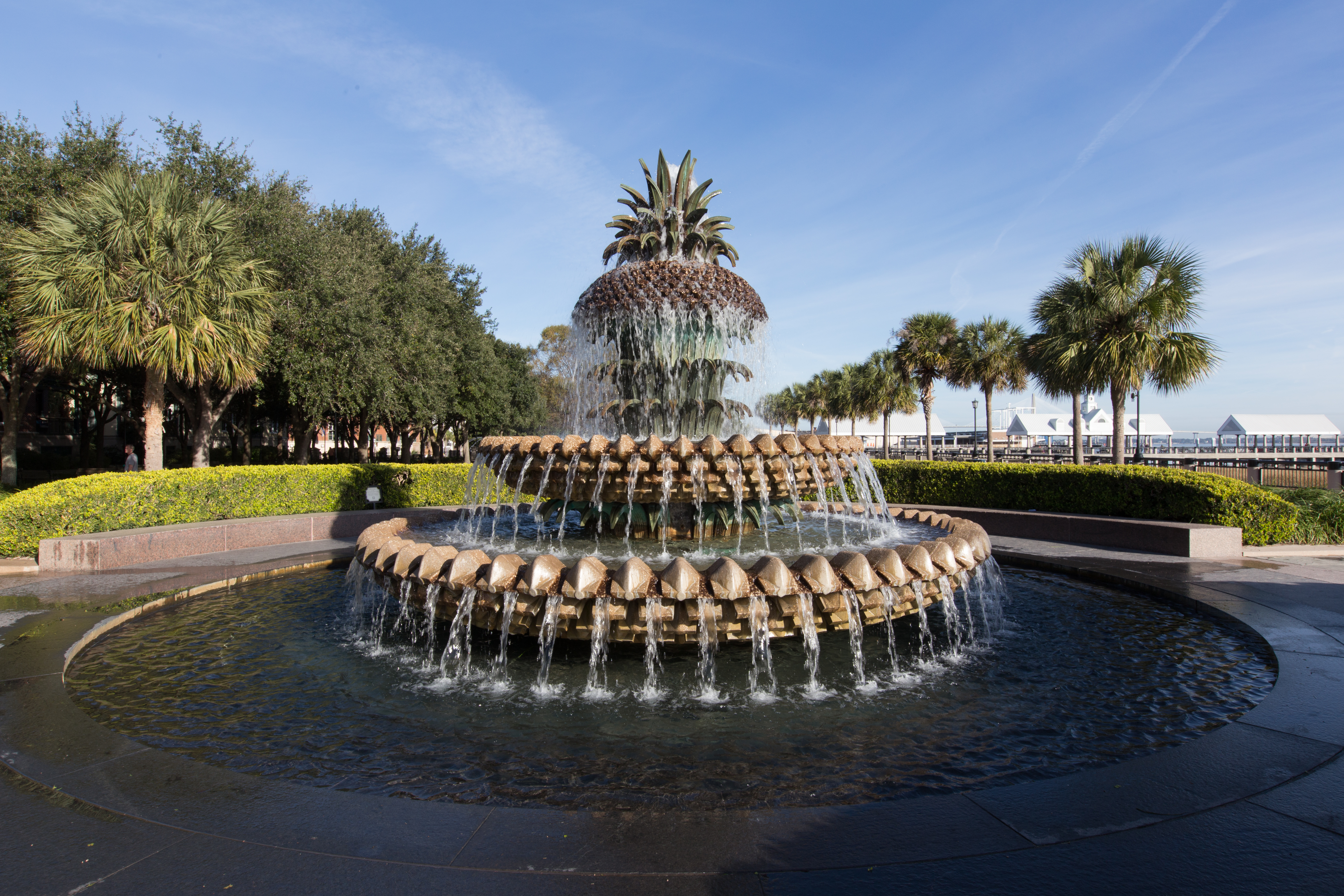
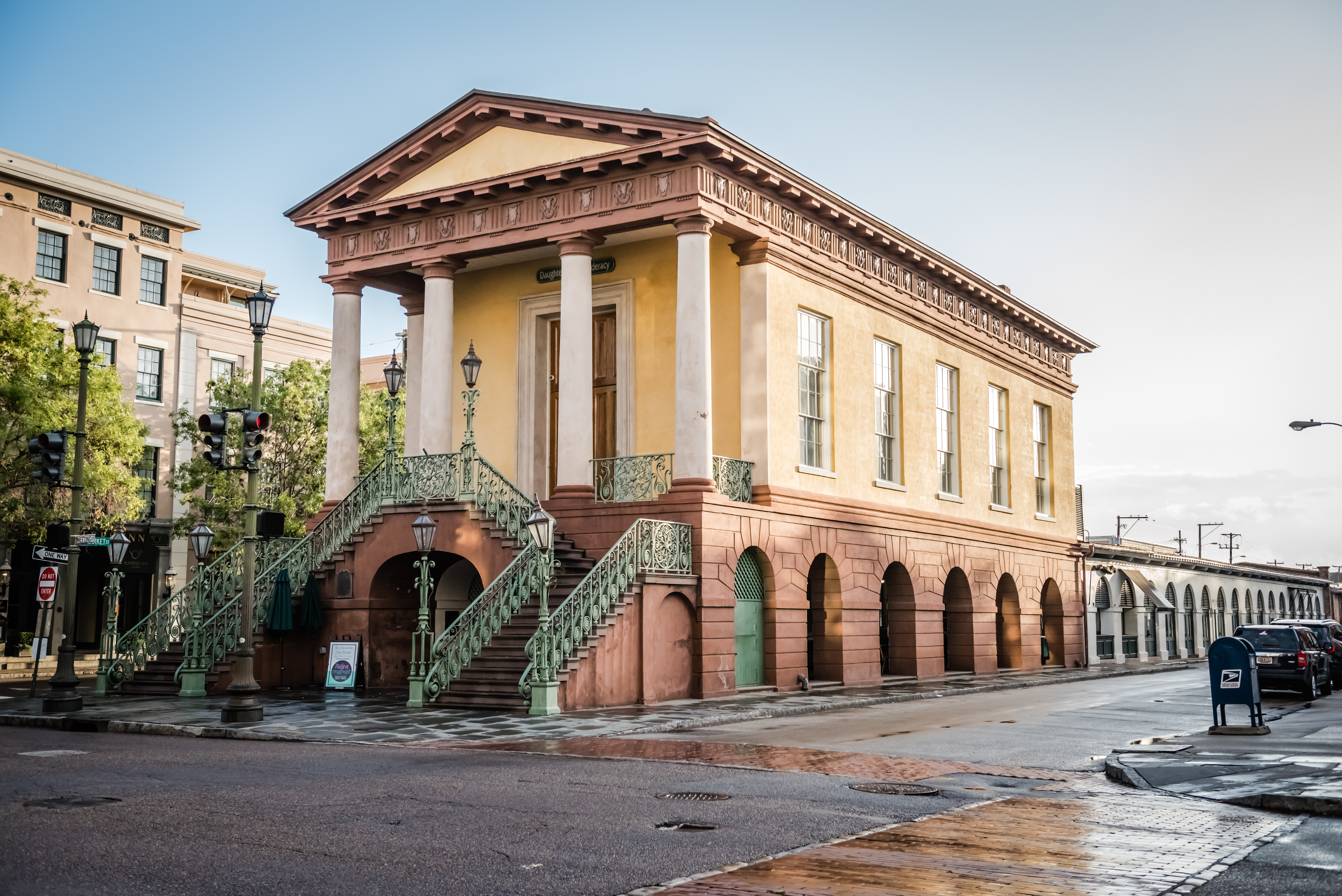
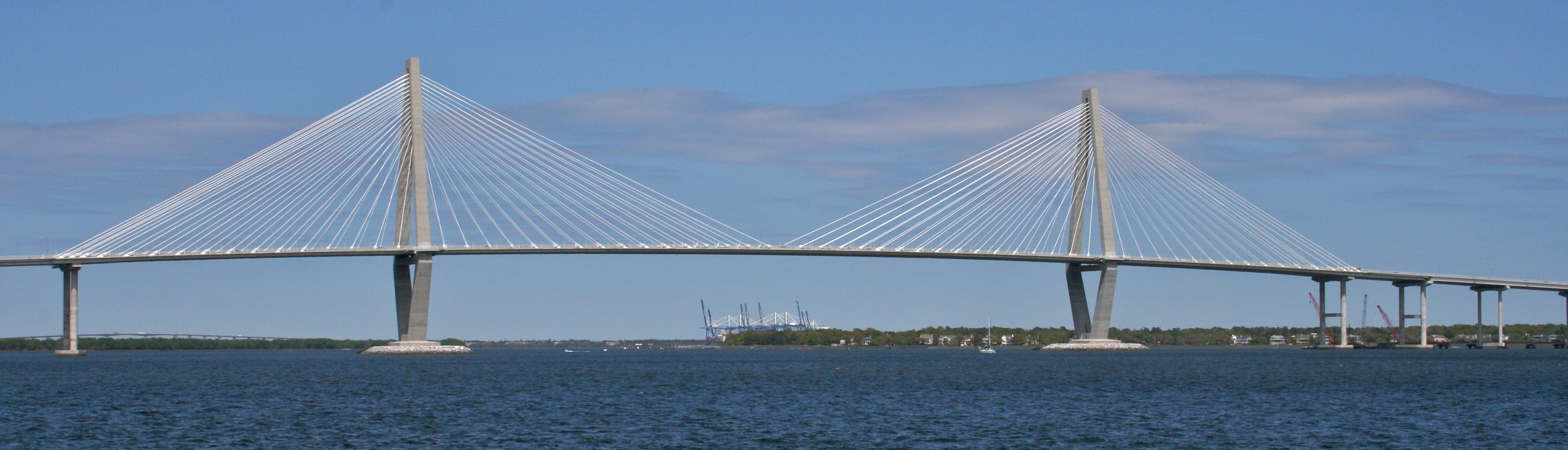
- Rainbow Row The Battery Port of Charleston Waterfront Park City Market Arthur Ravenel Jr. Bridge

- Flag Seal
- Nicknames: The Holy City, Chucktown
- Motto: "Ædes Mores Juraque Curat" (Latin) (She Guards Her Temples, Customs, and Laws) (Note: The female figure is sometimes glossed as Athena, although the official explanation is that she is a personification of Charleston itself. Similarly, although aedes properly refers to temples and originally referred to the churches depicted on the seal, the official gloss is that it intends the city's "buildings".)
- Interactive map of Charleston, South Carolina
- Location within South Carolina Location within the United States
- Coordinates: 32°48′50″N 79°55′55″W
- Country: United States
- State: South Carolina
- Counties: Charleston, Berkeley
- Founded: 1670; 356 years ago
- Chartered: 1783; 243 years ago
- Named for: Charles II of England

Government
  - Type: Mayor–council
  - Body: Charleston City Council
  - Mayor: William S. Cogswell Jr. (R)

Area
  - City: 135.51 sq mi (350.97 km^{2})
  - Land: 115.03 sq mi (297.93 km^{2})
  - Water: 20.48 sq mi (53.04 km^{2}) 15.11%
- Elevation: 3 ft (0.91 m)

Population (2020)
  - City: 150,227
  - Estimate (2025): 159,423 ▲
  - Rank: 171st in the United States; 1st in South Carolina
  - Density: 1,306.0/sq mi (504.24/km^{2})
  - Urban: 684,773 (US: 63rd)
  - Metro: 849,417 (US: 71st)
  - Demonym: Charlestonian
- Time zone: UTC−5 (EST)
  - Summer (DST): UTC−4 (EDT)
- ZIP Codes: 29401–29407, 29409–29410, 29412–29420, 29422–29425, 29492
- Area codes: 843, 854
- FIPS code: 45-13330
- GNIS feature ID: 2404030
- Website: charleston-sc.gov

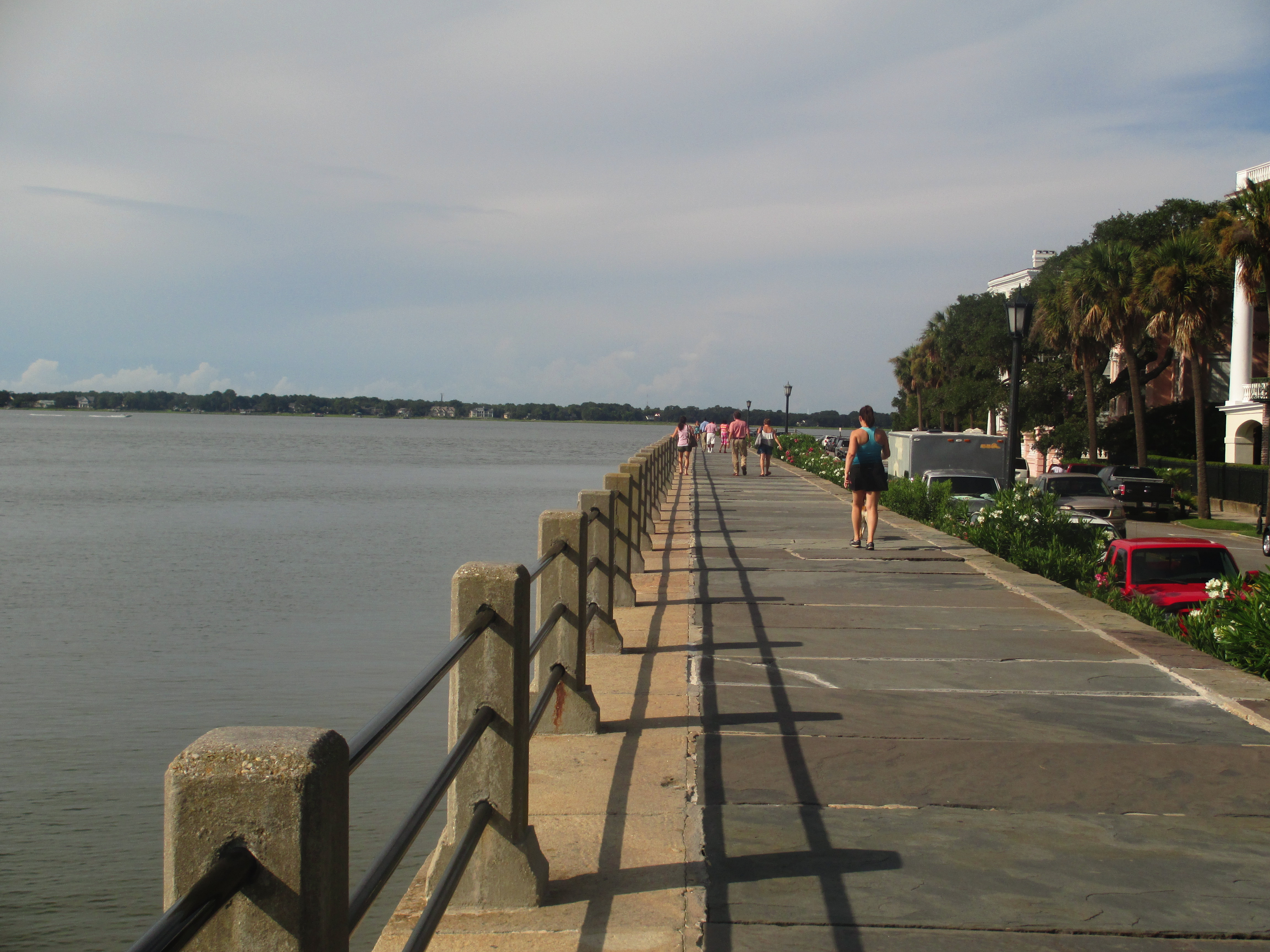
The downtown Charleston waterfront on the Battery

Charleston is the most populous city in the U.S. state of South Carolina. The city lies just south of the geographical midpoint of South Carolina's coastline on Charleston Harbor, an inlet of the Atlantic Ocean formed by the confluence of the Ashley, Cooper, and Wando rivers. Charleston had a population of 150,227 at the 2020 census, while the Charleston metropolitan area, comprising Berkeley, Charleston, and Dorchester counties, has an estimated 870,000 residents. (Note: As defined by the Office of Management and Budget, for use by the U.S. Census Bureau for statistical purposes only.) It ranks as the third-most-populous metropolitan area in the state and the 71st-most-populous in the U.S. It is the county seat of Charleston County.

Charleston was founded as Charles Town in 1670 by English colonists, who named it in honor of Charles II of England. Originally established at Albemarle Point on the west bank of the Ashley River (now Charles Towne Landing), the settlement was moved in 1680 to its present location, where it quickly grew to become the fifth-largest city in North America by the 1690s. During the colonial period, Charleston remained unincorporated and was governed by a colonial legislature and a royal governor, with administrative districts and social services organized by Anglican parishes.

The city was renamed Charleston on August 13, 1783, when it was incorporated by the state legislature. Although the state capital was relocated to Columbia in 1788, Charleston remained among the top 10 U.S. cities by population through 1840. A significant part of Charleston's history is its central role in the Atlantic slave trade; local merchants, including Joseph Wragg, helped break the monopoly of the Royal African Company, making Charleston a primary entry point for enslaved Africans. Almost one-half of enslaved people imported to the United States arrived in Charleston. In 2018, the city formally apologized for its role in the American slave trade.

The economy of Charleston is anchored by tourism, port and logistics, aerospace, and information technology. The city is home to the Port of Charleston, one of the busiest in the United States, which significantly contributes to regional trade and economic activity. Boeing and other major employers have established a strong aerospace presence, while its growing tech industry has led to the nickname "Silicon Harbor". Culturally, Charleston is renowned for its well-preserved architecture, historic landmarks, and rich Gullah heritage, alongside vibrant culinary, music, and arts scenes. Popular attractions include the historic City Market, Fort Sumter National Monument, and antebellum homes along the Battery and Rainbow Row.

== History ==
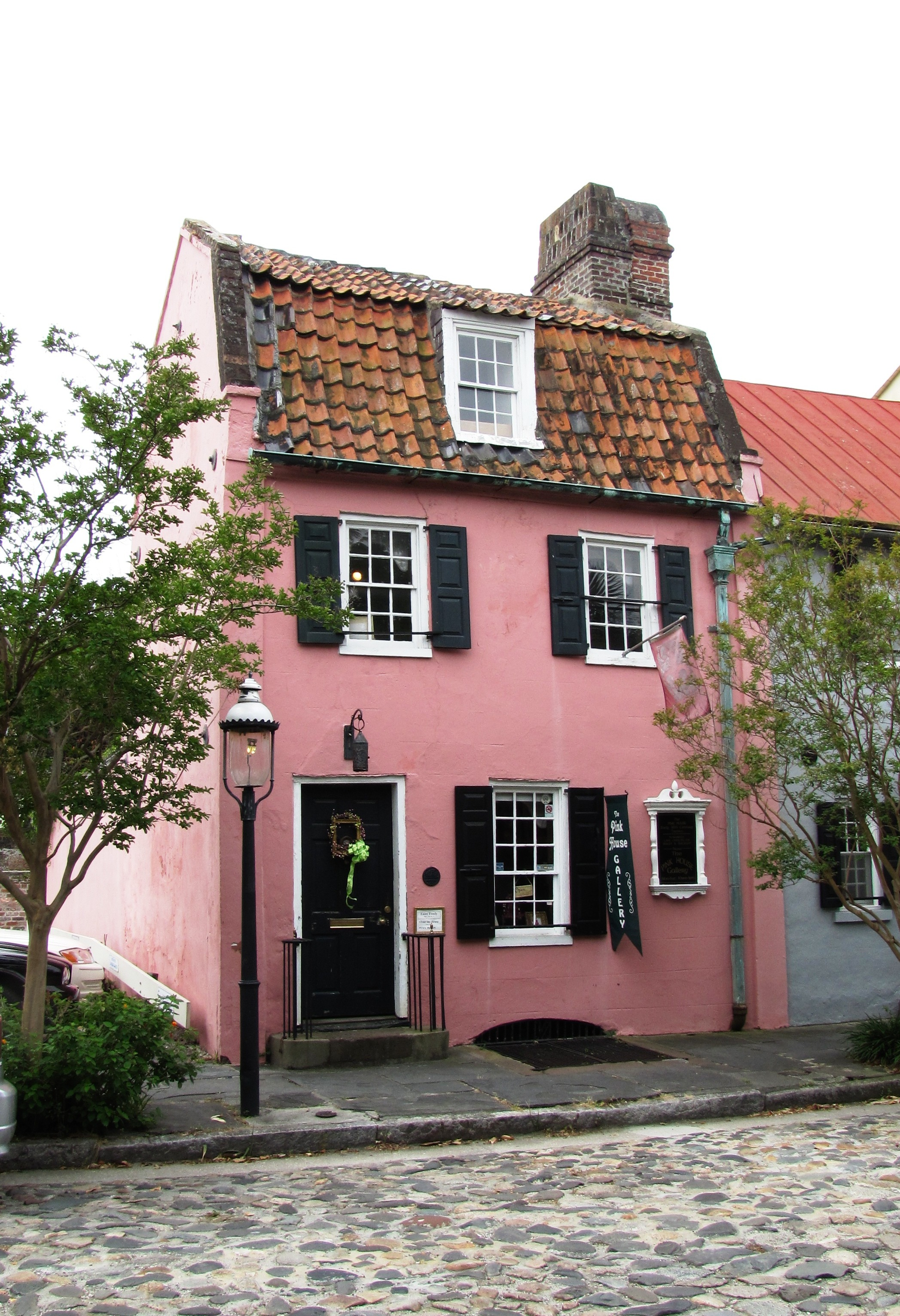
The Pink House, at 17 Chalmers Street, was built of Bermudian limestone between 1694 and 1712 and is the oldest stone building in Charleston.

=== Pre-Columbian Era ===
The unified Cusabo people (including sub tribes such as Kiawah) and the Ittiwan people inhabited the area prior to colonial settlement. They were known as "Settlement Indians" by colonists.

=== Colonial era (1670–1776) ===
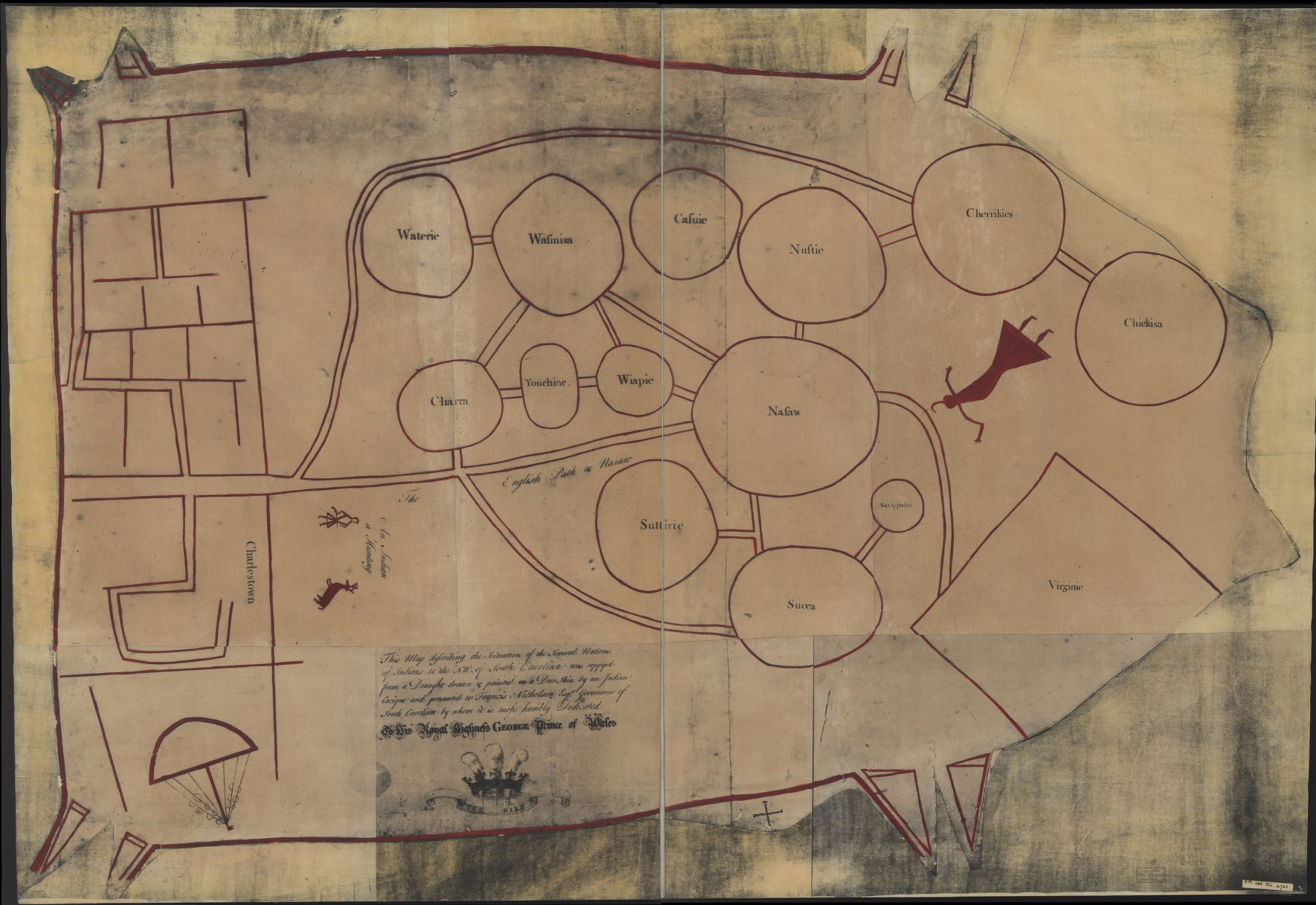
A map of the "Several Nations of Indians to the Northwest of South Carolina" or the "Catawba Deerskin Map", an annotated copy of a hand-painted deerskin original made by a Catawba chief for Governor Francis Nicholson. "This map describing the scituation [sic] of the several nations of Indians to the NW of South Carolina was coppyed [sic] from a draught [sic] drawn & painted on a deer skin by an Indian Cacique and presented to Francis Nicholason Esqr. Governor of South Carolina by whom it is most humbly dedicated to his Royal Highness George, Prince of Wales".

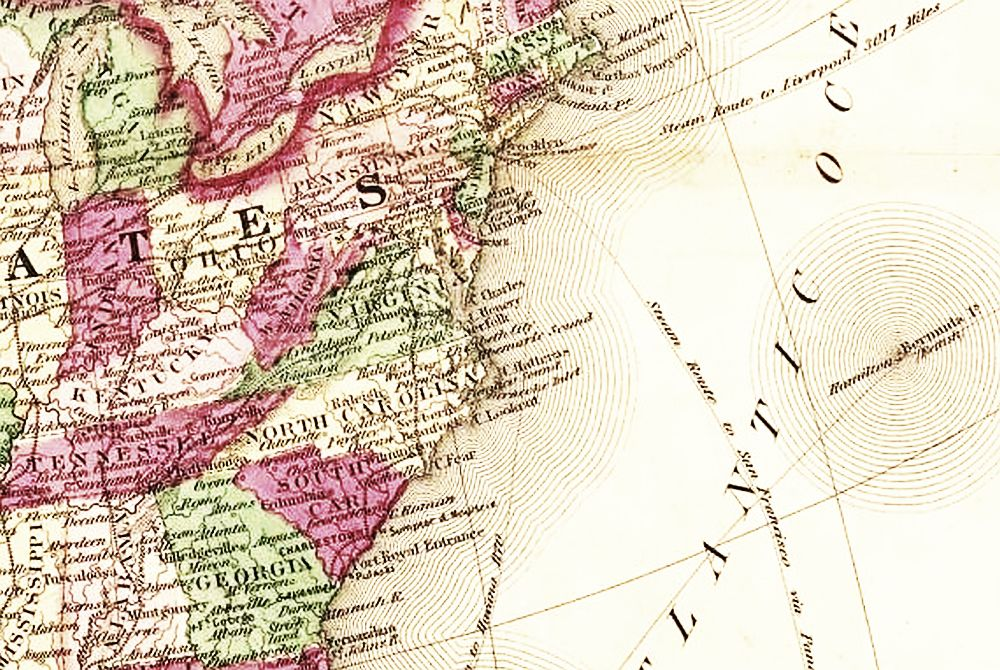
Map of the Carolinas, Virginia, and Georgia relative to Bermuda

King Charles II granted the chartered Province of Carolina to eight of his loyal friends, known as the Lords Proprietors, on March 24, 1663. Later that year, prominent planters from Barbados attempted their first settlement in the Carolinas on the Cape Fear River, building what would become Charles Towne, North Carolina. This settlement was short lived and most returned back to Barbados a few years into the enterprise. In 1670, Governor William Sayle arranged for several shiploads of settlers from Bermuda and Barbados. These settlers established what was then called Charles Town at Albemarle Point, on the west bank of the Ashley River, a few miles northwest of the present-day city center. Charles Town became the first comprehensively planned town in the Thirteen Colonies. Its governance, settlement, and development were to follow a visionary plan known as the Grand Model prepared for the Lord's Proprietors by John Locke. Because the Carolina's Fundamental Constitutions were never ratified, however, Charles Town was never incorporated during the colonial period. Instead, local ordinances were passed by the provincial government, with day-to-day administration handled by the wardens and vestries of St Philip's and St Michael's Anglican parishes.

At the time of European colonization, the area was inhabited by the indigenous Cusabo, on whom the settlers declared war in October 1671. The settlers initially allied with the Westo, a northern indigenous tribe that traded in enslaved Indians. The settlers abandoned their alliance with the Westo in 1679 and allied with the Cusabo instead.

The initial settlement quickly dwindled and disappeared while another village—established by the settlers on Oyster Point at the confluence of the Ashley and Cooper rivers around 1672—thrived. In 1680, this second settlement formally replaced the original Charles Town, which today is commemorated as Charles Towne Landing. The second location was more defensible and had access to a fine natural harbor. The new town had become the fifth largest in North America by 1690.

A smallpox outbreak erupted in 1698, followed by an earthquake in February 1699. The latter caused a fire that destroyed about a third of the town. During rebuilding, a yellow fever outbreak killed about 15% of the remaining inhabitants. Charles Town suffered between five and eight significant yellow fever outbreaks over the first half of the 18th century.

It developed a reputation as one of the least healthy locations in the Thirteen Colonies for ethnic Europeans. Malaria was endemic. Although malaria did not have such high mortality as yellow fever, it caused much illness. It was a major health problem throughout most of the city's history before dying out in the 1950s after the use of pesticides cut down on the mosquitoes that transmitted it.

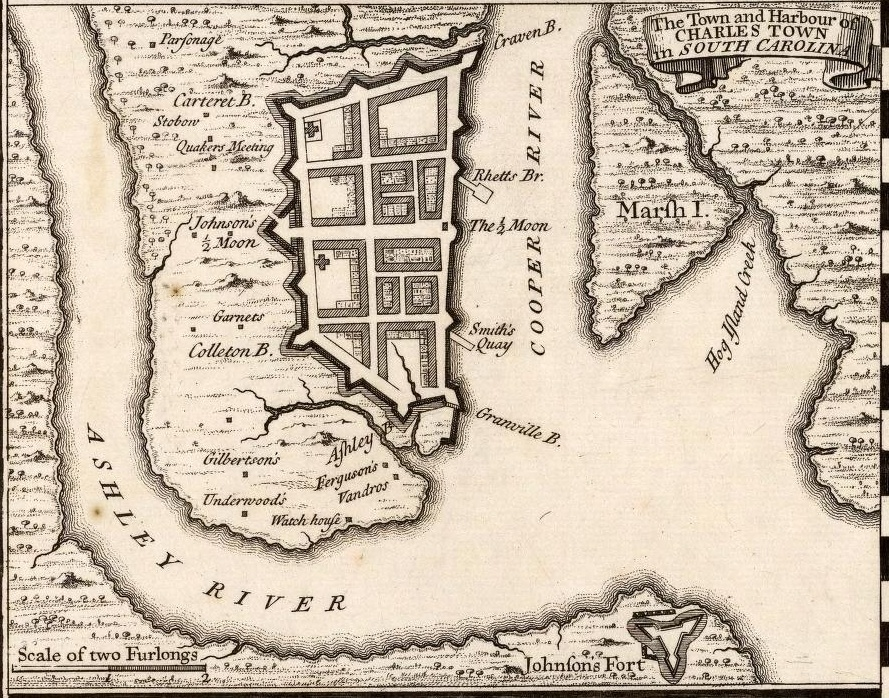
Herman Moll's 1733 Town and Harbour of Charles Town in South Carolina, showing the town's defensive walls.

Charles Town was fortified according to a plan developed in 1704 under Governor Nathaniel Johnson. Both Spain and France contested Britain's claims to the region. Various bands of Native Americans and independent pirates also raided it.

On September 5–6, 1713 (O.S.), a violent hurricane passed over Charles Town. The Circular Congregational Church manse was damaged during the storm, and church records were lost. Much of Charles Town was flooded as "the Ashley and Cooper rivers became one." At least seventy people died in the disaster.

From the 1670s, Charleston attracted pirates. The combination of a weak government and corruption made the city popular with pirates, who frequently visited and raided the city. Charles Town was besieged by the pirate Blackbeard for several days in May 1718. Blackbeard released his hostages and left in exchange for a chest of medicine from Governor Robert Johnson.

Around 1719, the town's name began to be generally written as Charlestown and, excepting those fronting the Cooper River, the old walls were largely removed over the next decade. Charlestown was a center for the inland colonization of South Carolina. It remained the southernmost point of the Southern Colonies until the Province of Georgia was established in 1732. As noted, the first settlers primarily came from Europe, Barbados and Bermuda. The Barbadian and Bermudan immigrants were planters who brought enslaved Africans with them, having purchased them in the West Indies.

Early immigrant groups to the city included the Huguenots, Scottish, Irish, and Germans, as well as hundreds of Jews, predominately Sephardi from London and significant cities of the Dutch Republic, where they had been given refuge. As late as 1830, Charleston's Jewish community was the most prominent and wealthiest in North America.

By 1708, most of the colony's population were Black Africans. They had been brought to Charlestown via the Atlantic slave trade, first as indentured servants and then as enslaved people. In the early 1700s, Charleston's largest slave trader, Joseph Wragg, pioneered the settlement's involvement in the slave trade. Of the estimated 400,000 captive Africans transported to North America to be sold into slavery, 40% are thought to have landed at Sullivan's Island off Charlestown. Free people of color also migrated from the West Indies, being descendants of white planters and their Black consorts and unions among the working classes.

In 1767, Gadsden's Wharf was constructed at the city port on the Cooper River; it ultimately extended 840 feet and could accommodate six ships at a time. Many enslaved people were sold from here. Devoted to plantation agriculture that depended on enslaved labor, South Carolina became a slave society: it had a majority-Black population from the colonial period until after the Great Migration of the early 20th century, when many rural Blacks moved to northern and midwestern industrial cities to escape Jim Crow laws.

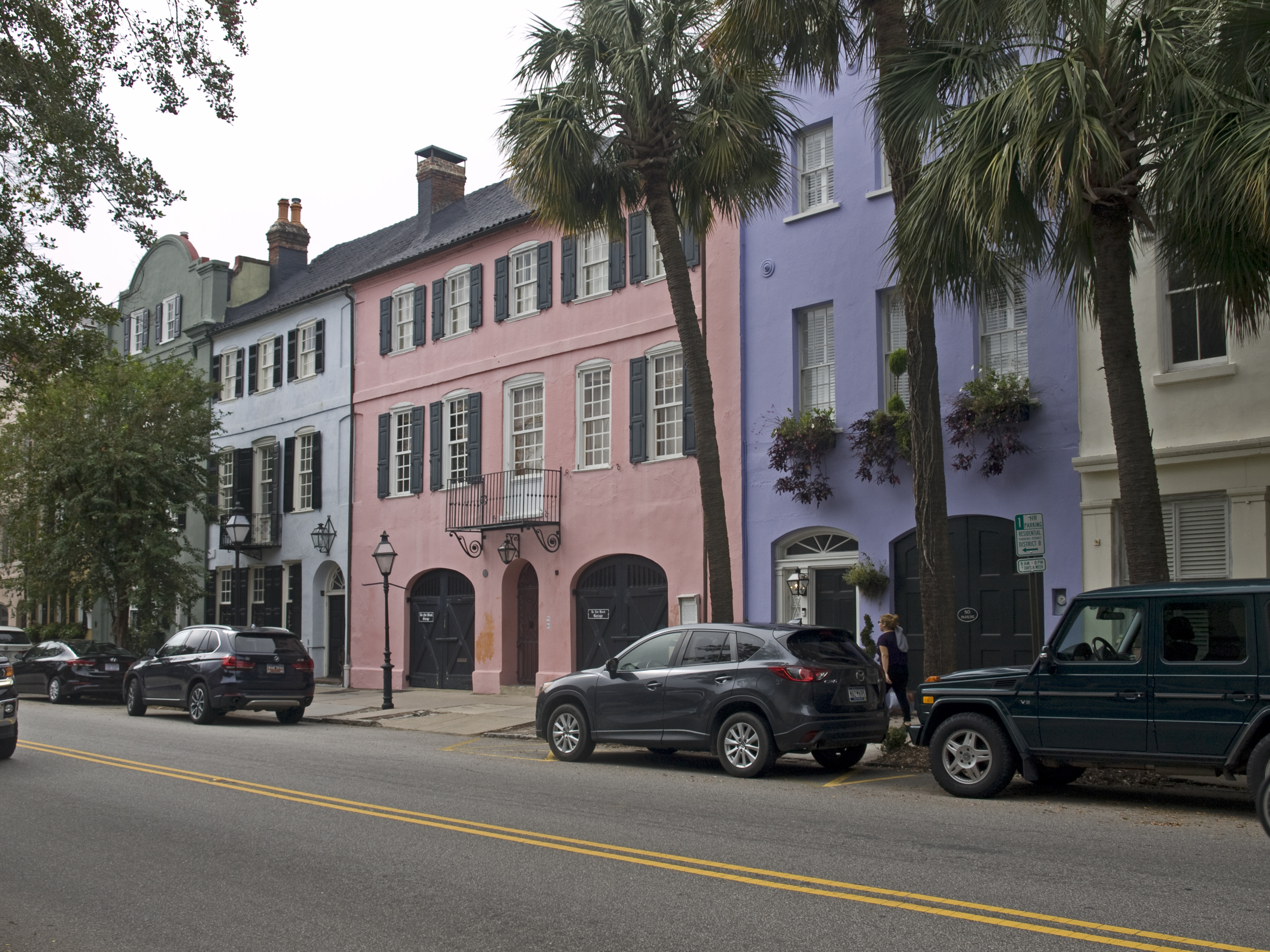
Rainbow Row's 13 houses along East Bay Street formed the commercial center of the town in the colonial period.

At the foundation of the town, the principal items of commerce were pine timber and pitch for ships and tobacco. The early economy developed around the deerskin trade, in which colonists used alliances with the Cherokee and Creek peoples to secure the raw material.

At the same time, Native Americans kidnapped and enslaved each other in warfare. From 1680 to 1720, approximately 40,000 native men, women, and children were sold through the port, principally to the West Indies (such as Bermuda and the Bahamas), but also to other Southern colonies. The Lowcountry planters did not keep enslaved Native Americans, considering them too prone to escape or revolt. They used the proceeds of their sale to purchase enslaved Black Africans for their own plantations. The slave raiding—and the European firearms it introduced—helped destabilize Spanish Florida and French Louisiana in the 1700s during the War of the Spanish Succession. But it also provoked the Yamasee War of the 1710s that nearly destroyed the colony. After that, South Carolina largely abandoned the Indian slave trade.

The area's unsuitability for growing tobacco prompted the Lowcountry planters to experiment with other cash crops. The profitability of growing rice led the planters to pay premiums for enslaved people from the "Rice Coast" who knew its cultivation; their descendants make up the ethnic Gullah who created their own culture and language in this area. Slaves imported from the Caribbean showed the planter George Lucas's daughter Eliza how to raise and use indigo for dyeing in 1747.

Throughout this period, enslaved people were sold aboard the arriving ships or at ad hoc gatherings in the town's taverns. Runaways and minor slave rebellions prompted the 1739 Security Act, which required all white men to carry weapons at all times (even to church on Sundays). Before it fully took effect, the Cato or Stono Rebellion broke out. The white community had recently been decimated by a malaria outbreak, and the rebels killed about 25 white people before being stopped by the colonial militia. As a result of their fears of rebellion, whites killed a total of 35 to 50 Black people.

The planters attributed the violence to recently imported Africans and agreed to a 10-year moratorium on slave importation through Charlestown. They relied for labor upon the slave communities they already held. The 1740 Negro Act also tightened controls, requiring a ratio of one white for every ten Blacks on any plantation (which was often not achieved) and banning enslaved people from assembling, growing personal food, earning money, or learning to read. Drums were banned because Africans used them for signaling; enslaved people were allowed to use string and other instruments. When the moratorium expired and Charlestown reopened to the slave trade in 1750, the memory of the Stono Rebellion resulted in traders avoiding buying enslaved people from the Congo and Angola, whose populations had a reputation for independence.

By the mid-18th century, Charlestown was the hub of the Atlantic slave trade in the Southern Colonies. Even with the decade-long moratorium, its customs processed around 40% of the enslaved Africans brought to North America between 1700 and 1775, and about half up until the end of the African trade.

The plantations and the economy based on them made this the wealthiest city in the Thirteen Colonies and the largest in population south of Philadelphia. In 1770, the city had 11,000 inhabitants—half enslaved—and was the 4th-largest port in the colonies, after Boston, New York City, and Philadelphia.

The elite began to use their wealth to encourage cultural and social development. America's first theater building was constructed in 1736; today's Dock Street Theater later replaced it. St Michael's was erected in 1753. Benevolent societies were formed by the Huguenots, free people of color, (Note: The Brown Fellowship Society, initially a burial society, operated from 1790 to 1945.) Germans, and Jews. The Library Society was established in 1748 by well-born young men who wanted to share the financial cost of keeping up with the scientific and philosophical issues of the day.

=== American Revolution (1776–1783) ===
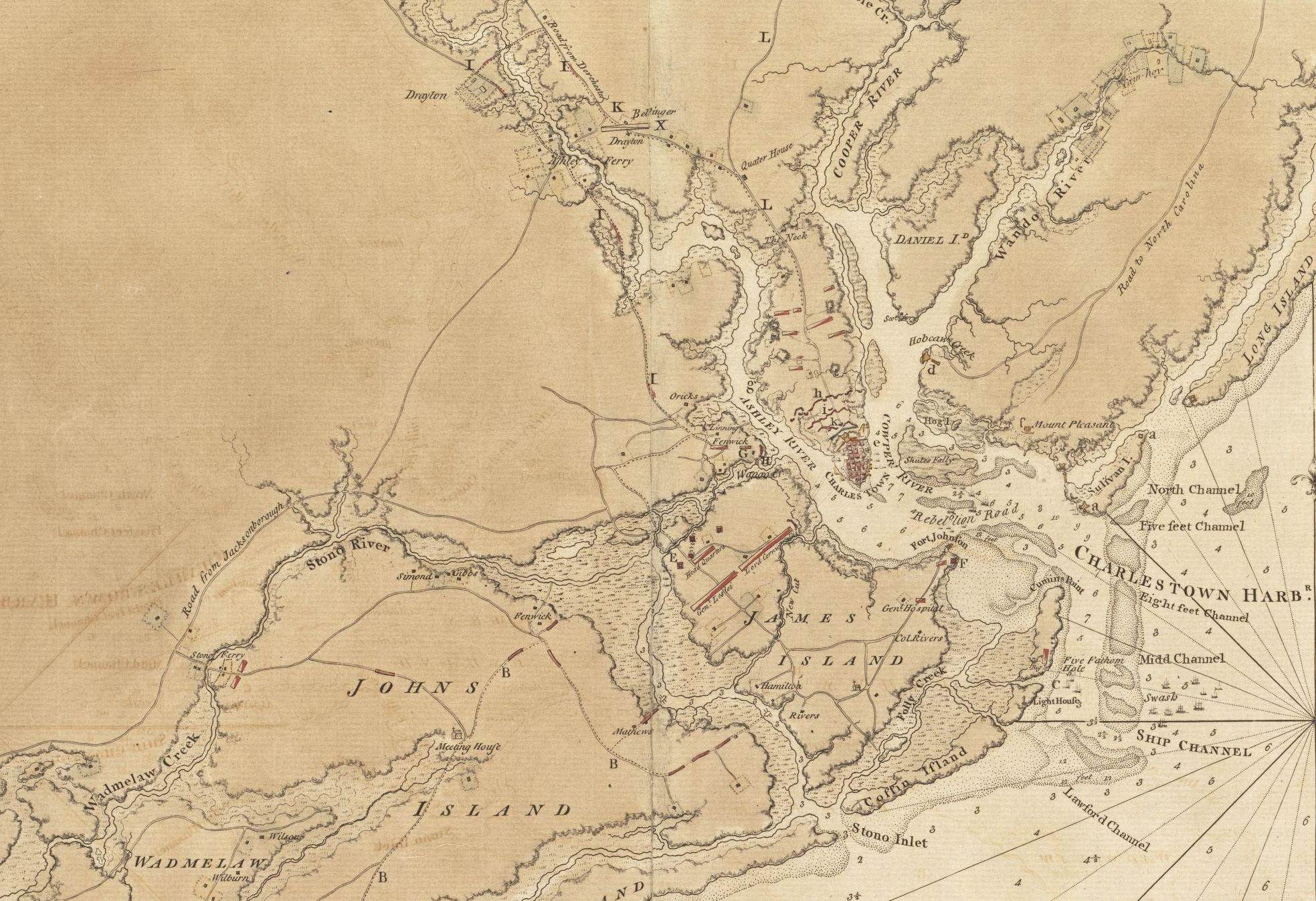
Charlestown and environs in 1780

Delegates for the Continental Congress were elected in 1774, and South Carolina declared its independence from Britain on the steps of the Exchange. Slavery was again an important factor in the city's role during the Revolutionary War. The British attacked the settlement three times, assuming that the settlement had a large base of Loyalists who would rally to their cause once given some military support. The loyalty of white Southerners towards the Crown had largely been forfeited, however, by British legal cases (such as the 1772 Somersett case which marked the prohibition of slavery in England and Wales, a significant milestone in the abolitionist struggle) and military tactics (such as Dunmore's Proclamation in 1775) that promised the emancipation of people enslaved by Patriot planters; these efforts did, however, unsurprisingly win the allegiance of thousands of Black Loyalists.

The Battle of Sullivan's Island saw the British fail to capture a partially constructed palmetto palisade from Col. Moultrie's militia regiment on June 28, 1776. The Liberty Flag used by Moultrie's men formed the basis of the later South Carolina flag, and the victory's anniversary continues to be commemorated as Carolina Day.

Making the capture of Charlestown their chief priority, the British sent Sir Henry Clinton, who laid siege to Charleston on April 1, 1780, with about 14,000 troops and 90 ships. Bombardment began on March 11, 1780. The Patriots, led by Benjamin Lincoln, had about 5,500 men and inadequate fortifications to repel the forces against them. After the British cut his supply lines and lines of retreat at the battles of Monck's Corner and Lenud's Ferry, Lincoln's surrender on May 12, 1780, became the greatest American defeat of the war.

The British continued to hold Charlestown for over a year following their defeat at Yorktown in 1781. However, they alienated local planters by refusing to restore full civil government. Nathanael Greene had entered the state after Cornwallis's pyrrhic victory at Guilford Courthouse and kept the area under a kind of siege. British Army officer Alexander Leslie, commanding Charlestown, requested a truce in March 1782 to purchase food for his garrison and the town's inhabitants. Greene refused and formed a brigade under Mordecai Gist to counter British forays. The British finally evacuated Charlestown in December 1782. Greene presented the British leaders of the town with the Moultrie Flag.

=== Antebellum era (1783–1861) ===
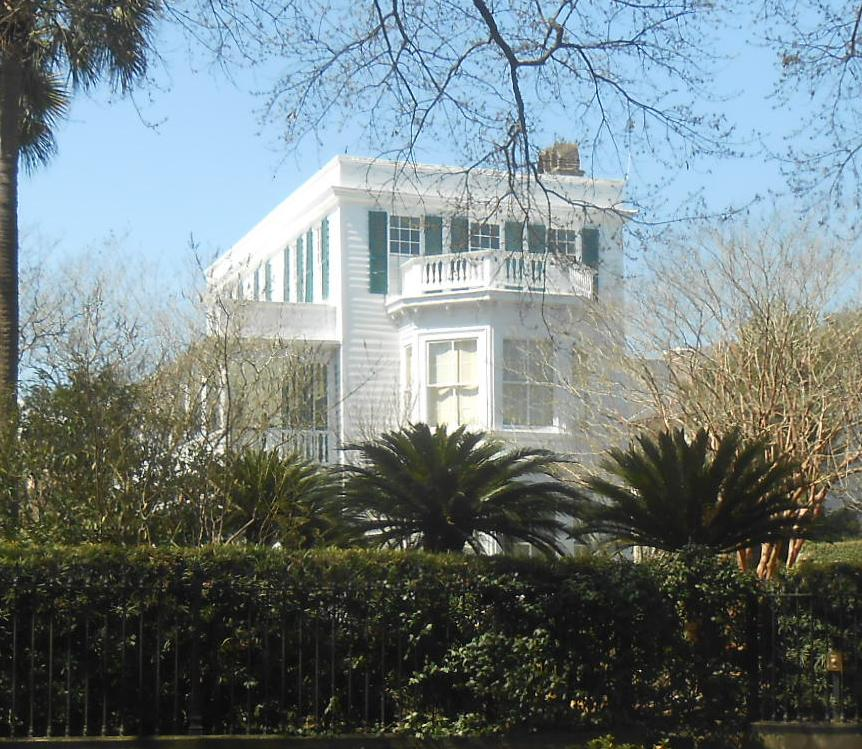
Ladson House, built in 1792 for Lieutenant Governor James Ladson

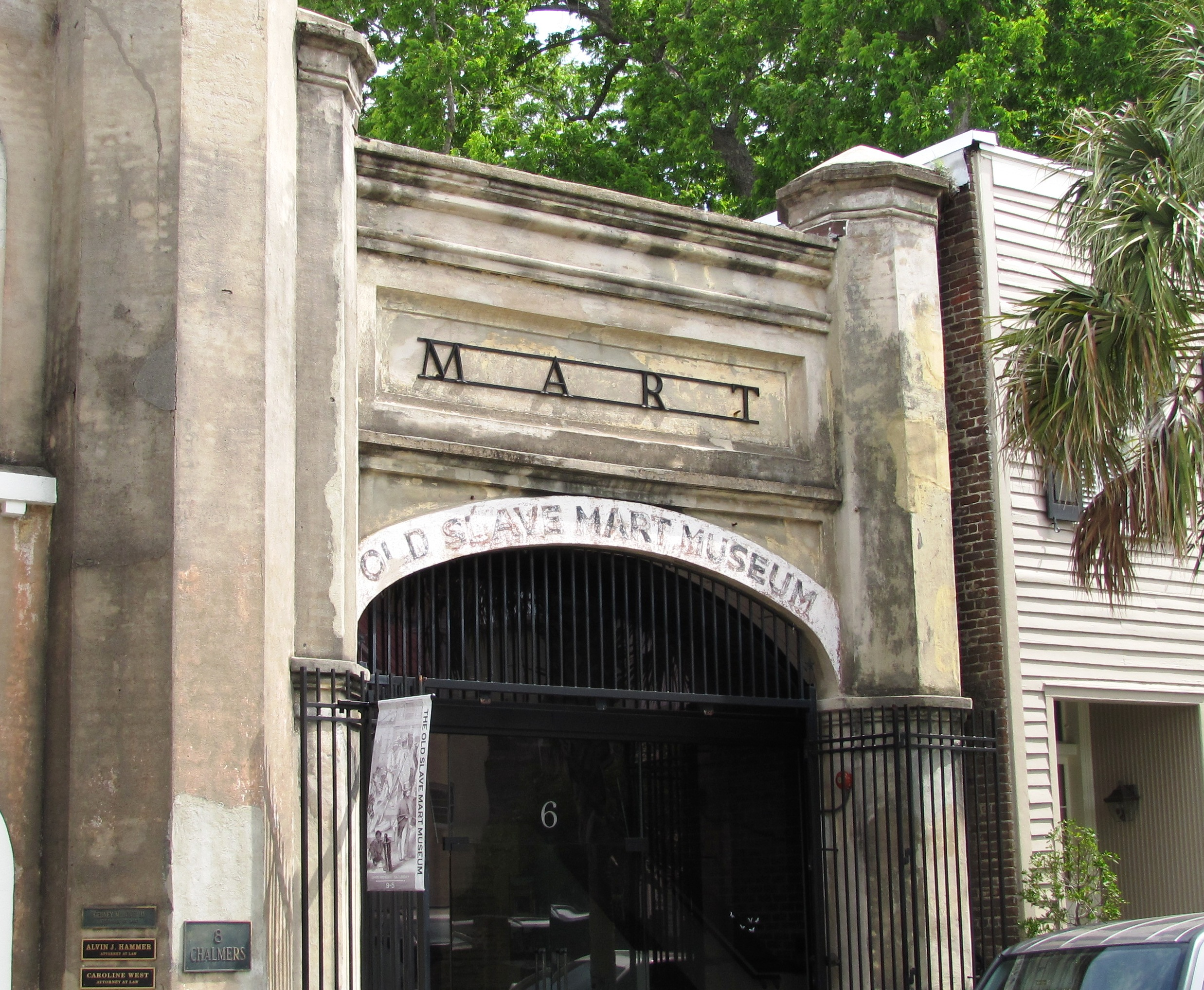
The former German Fire Co. Engine House and Old Slave Mart Museum, at 8 and 6 Chalmers Street, respectively, were built in 1859.

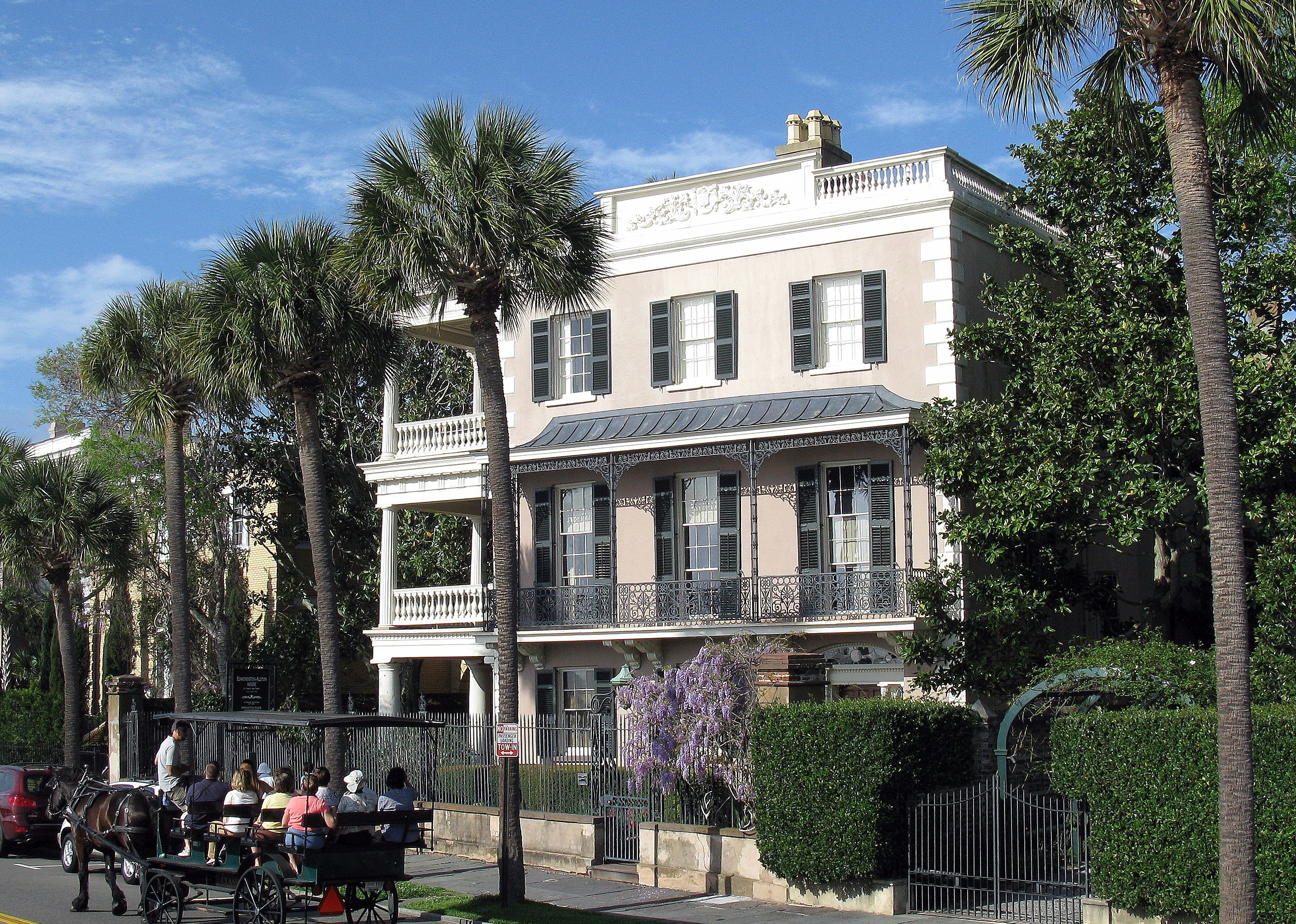
Edmondston-Alston House, built in 1828 on the Battery, showing carriage tour

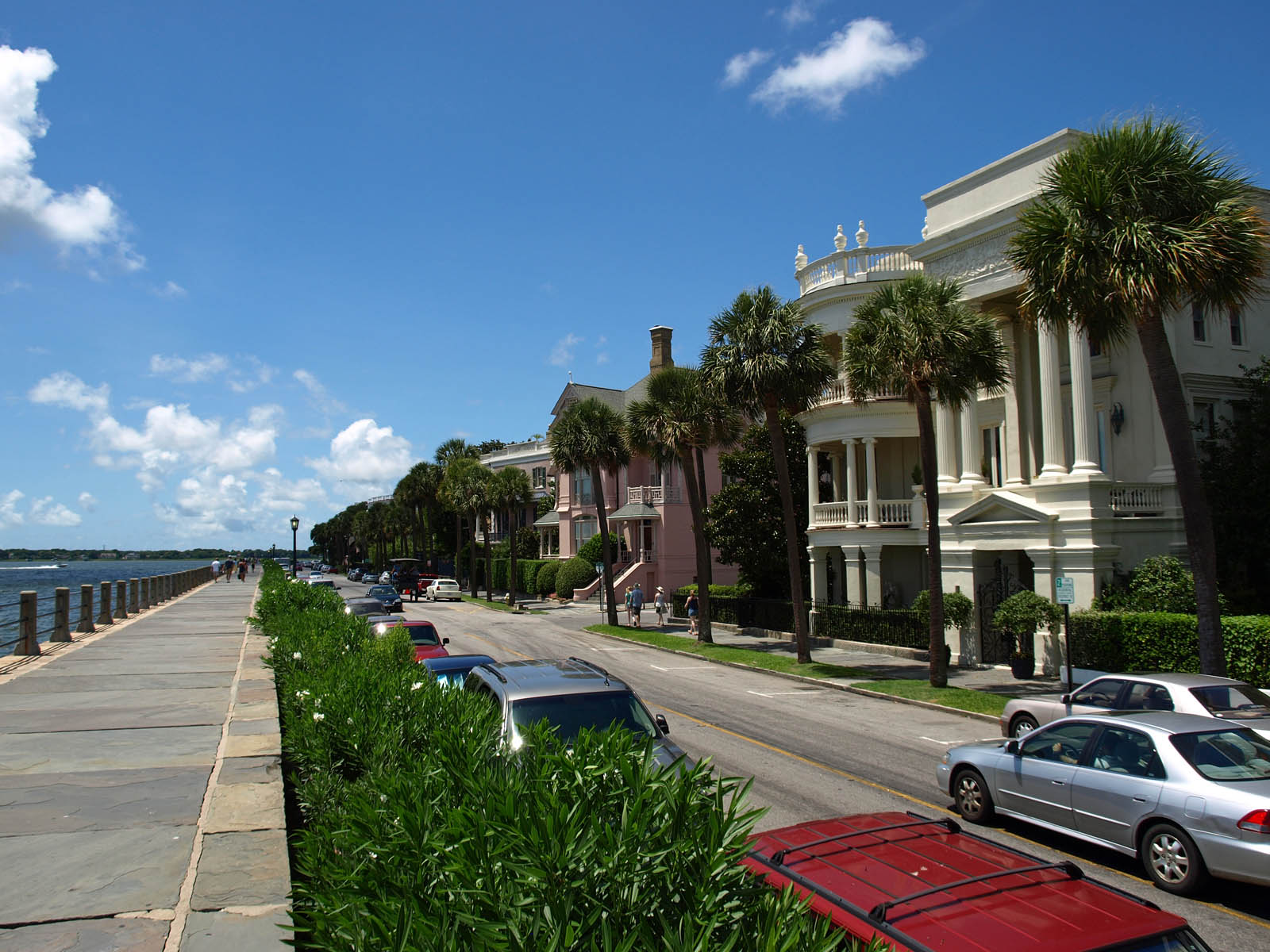
Homes along the Battery

Between the Revolutionary War and the Civil War, Charleston experienced an economic boom, at least for the top strata of society. Expanding cotton as a cash crop in the South led to massive wealth for a small segment of society and funded impressive architecture and culture. However, it also escalated the economic importance of enslaving people and led to greater and greater restrictions on Black Charlestonians.

By 1783, the city's growth had reached a point where a municipal government became desirable; therefore, on August 13, 1783, an act of incorporation for Charleston was ratified. The act originally specified the city's name as "Charles Ton", as opposed to the previous Charlestown, but the spelling "Charleston" quickly came to dominate.

Although Columbia had replaced it as the state capital in 1788, Charleston became even more prosperous as Eli Whitney's 1793 invention of the cotton gin sped the processing of the crop over 50 times. Britain's Industrial Revolution—initially built upon its textile industry—took up the extra production ravenously and cotton became Charleston's major export commodity in the 19th century.

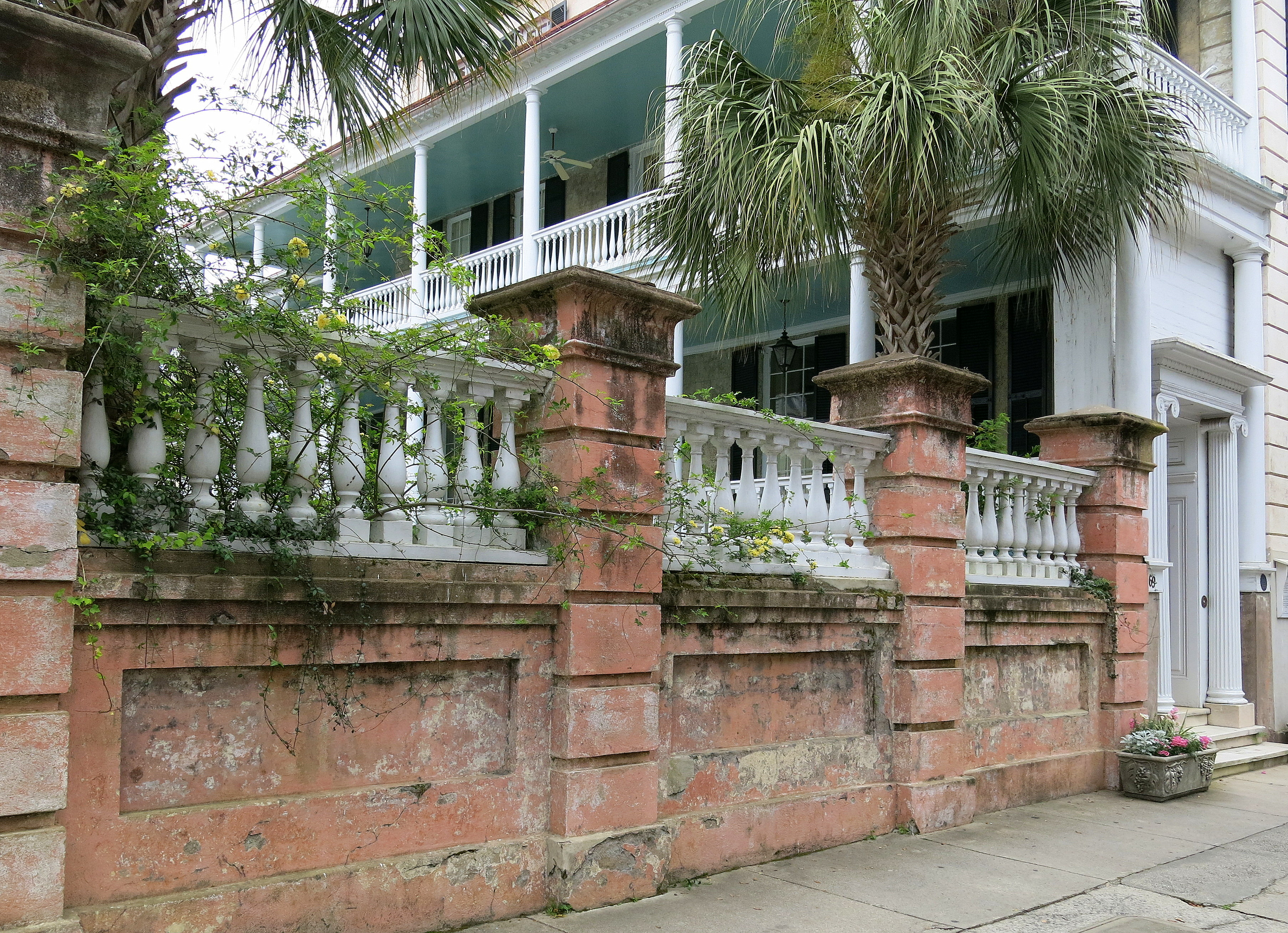
The Poyas-Cohen Mordecai House, at 69 Meeting Street, built in 1796–1800

The Bank of South Carolina, the second-oldest building in the nation to be constructed as a bank, was established in 1798. In 1800 and 1817, branches of the First and Second banks were also located in Charleston.

Throughout the Antebellum Period, Charleston continued to be the only major American city with a majority-slave population. (Note: Savannah, Georgia, and Richmond, Virginia, came closest, reaching 40% at times.) The city's widespread use of enslaved people as workers was a frequent subject of writers and visitors: a merchant from Liverpool noted in 1834 that "almost all the working population are Negroes, all the servants, the carmen & porters, all the people who see at the stalls in Market, and most of the Journeymen in trades". American traders had been prohibited from equipping the Atlantic slave trade in 1794 and all importation of enslaved people was banned in 1808, but American merchantmen frequently refused to permit British inspection for enslaved cargo, and smuggling remained common. Much more important was the domestic slave trade, which boomed as the Deep South developed into new cotton plantations. As a result of the trade, there was a forced migration of more than one million enslaved people from the Upper South to the Lower South in the antebellum years. During the early 19th century, the first dedicated slave markets were founded in Charleston, mostly near Chalmers and State streets. Many domestic slavers used Charleston as a port in the coastwise trade, traveling to such ports as Mobile and New Orleans.

Enslaving was the primary marker of class, and even the town's freedmen and free people of color typically enslaved people if they had the wealth to do so. Visitors commonly remarked on the sheer number of Blacks in Charleston and their seeming freedom of movement, though in fact—mindful of the Stono Rebellion and the slave revolution that established Haiti—the whites closely regulated the behavior of both enslaved and free people of color. The town fixed wages and hiring practices, sometimes required identifying badges, and sometimes censored work songs. Punishment was handled out of sight by the city's workhouse, whose fees provided the municipal government with thousands a year. In 1820, state law mandated that each act of manumission (freeing an enslaved person) required legislative approval, effectively halting the practice.

The effects of slavery were pronounced on white society as well. The high cost of enslaving people in the 19th century and their high rate of return combined to institute an oligarchic society controlled by about ninety interrelated families, where 4% of the free population controlled half of the wealth, and the lower half of the free population—unable to compete with enslaved or rented people—held no wealth at all. The white middle class was minimal: Charlestonians generally looked down upon hard work, considering it as labor meant for enslaved people. All the enslavers taken together held 82% of the city's wealth and almost all non-enslavers were poor. Olmsted considered their civic elections "entirely contests of money and personal influence" and the oligarchs dominated civic planning: (Note: Olmsted, cited in McInnis.) The lack of public parks and amenities was noted, as was the abundance of private gardens in the wealthy's walled estates.

In the 1810s, the town's churches intensified their discrimination against their Black parishioners, culminating in Bethel Methodist's 1817 construction of a hearse house over its Black burial ground. 4,376 Black Methodists joined Morris Brown in establishing Hampstead Church, the African Methodist Episcopal church now known as Mother Emanuel. State and city laws prohibited Black literacy, limited Black worship to daylight hours, and required a majority of any church's parishioners be white. In June 1818, 140 Black church members at Hampstead Church were arrested, and eight of its leaders were given fines and ten lashes; police raided the church again in 1820 and pressured it in 1821.

In 1822, members of the church, led by Denmark Vesey, a lay preacher and carpenter who had bought his freedom after winning a lottery, planned an uprising and escape to Haiti—initially for Bastille Day—that failed when one enslaved person revealed the plot to his enslaver. (Note: A monument to Vesey as a freedom fighter was long opposed by Charleston's white community but was finally begun in 2010 after a compromise placed it in Hampton Park, out of the historic district and far from the original proposed site in Marion Square.) Over the next month, the city's intendant (mayor) James Hamilton Jr. organized a militia for regular patrols, initiated a secret and extrajudicial tribunal to investigate, and hanged 35 and exiled 35 or 37 enslaved people to Spanish Cuba for their involvement. Hamilton imposed more restrictions on both free and enslaved Blacks: South Carolina required free Black sailors to be imprisoned while their ships were in Charleston Harbor, although international treaties eventually required the United States to quash the practice; free Blacks were banned from returning to the state if they left for any reason; enslaved people were given a 9:15 pm curfew; the city razed Hampstead Church to the ground and erected a new arsenal. This structure later was the basis of the Citadel's first campus. The AME congregation built a new church, but in 1834, the city banned it and all Black worship services following Nat Turner's Rebellion in Virginia in 1831. The estimated 10% of enslaved people who came to America as Muslims never had a separate mosque. Enslavers sometimes provided them with beef rations instead of pork in recognition of religious traditions.

The Charleston Fire Scare of 1826 began on Christmas Eve 1825 when an arson fire on King Street caused over $80,000 worth of damage. For more than the next six months, until mid-June, fires were started night after night, sometimes as many as 5 fires at a time, devastating the city's wooden architecture. The city council offered a reward of $1000 for the capture of arsonists, who the white population believed to be slaves or Free Blacks; an angry crowd almost lynched some suspected culprits. At least 3 Blacks were convicted in connection with the fires. The final blaze caused another $100,000 in damage, again on King Street. Coming so soon after the Vesey Rebellion, the Fire Scare caused unease among the white population of the city. If the apparently elaborate planning behind the rebellion pointed to a man of unusual intelligence, the arsons, if caused by slaves or Free Blacks, were different only in scale from the kind of "passive resistance and petty sabotage" that every slaveholder experienced on a regular basis from their slaves. This underlined the fact that servile rebellion did not necessarily require great ingenuity and skill to effectively strike back at the enslavers of Blacks.

The registered tonnage of Charleston shipping in 1829 was 12,410. In 1832, South Carolina passed an ordinance of nullification, a procedure by which a state could, in effect, repeal a federal law; it was directed against the most recent tariff acts. Soon, U.S. soldiers were dispensed to Charleston's forts, and five United States Coast Guard cutters were detached to Charleston Harbor "to take possession of any vessel arriving from a foreign port, and defend her against any attempt to dispossess the Customs Officers of her custody until all the requirements of law have been complied with." This federal action became known as the Charleston incident. The state's politicians worked on a compromise law in Washington to gradually reduce the tariffs.

Charleston's embrace of classical architecture began after a devastating fire leveled much of the city. On April 27, 1838, Charleston suffered a catastrophic fire that burned more than 1000 buildings and caused about $3 million (equivalent to $89,569,000 in 2025) in damage at the time. The damaged buildings amounted to about one-fourth of all the businesses in the main part of the city. A great cultural awakening occurred when many homes and businesses were rebuilt or repaired. Before the fire, few homes were styled as Greek Revival; many residents decided to construct new buildings in that style after the conflagration. This tradition continued, making Charleston one of the foremost places to view Greek Revival architecture. The Gothic Revival also made a significant appearance in the construction of many churches after the fire that exhibited picturesque forms and reminders of devout European religion.

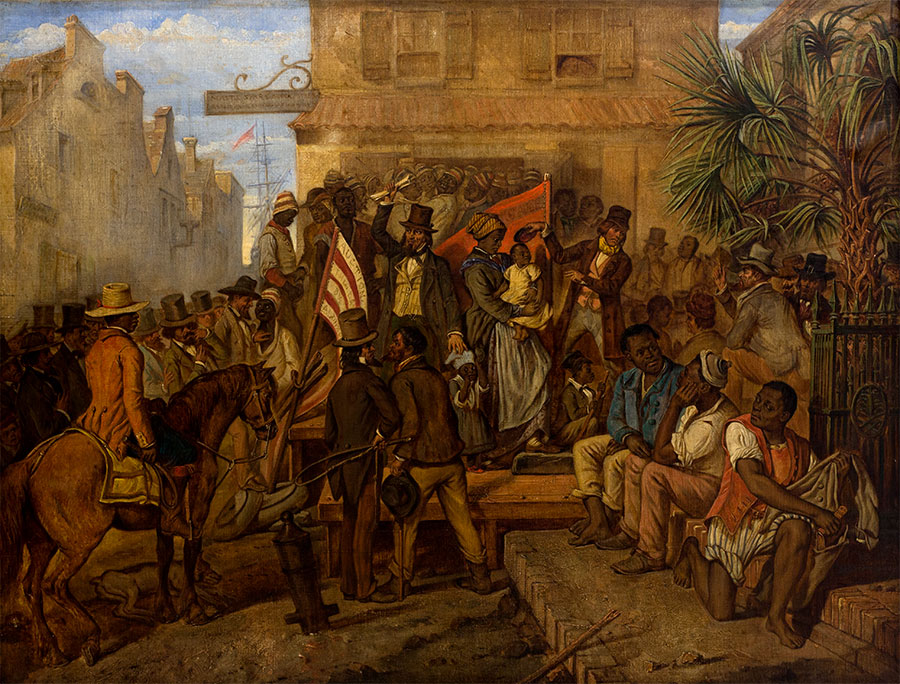
Alonzo J. White selling slaves in Charleston in 1853

By 1840, the Market Hall and Sheds, where fresh meat and produce were brought daily, became a hub of commercial activity. The slave trade also depended on the port of Charleston, where ships could be unloaded and enslaved people bought and sold. The legal importation of enslaved Africans had ended in 1808, although smuggling was significant. However, the domestic trade was booming. More than one million enslaved people were transported from the Upper South to the Deep South in the antebellum years, as cotton plantations were widely developed through what became known as the Black Belt. Many enslaved people were transported in the coastwise slave trade, with slave ships stopping at ports such as Charleston.

=== American Civil War (1861–1865) ===
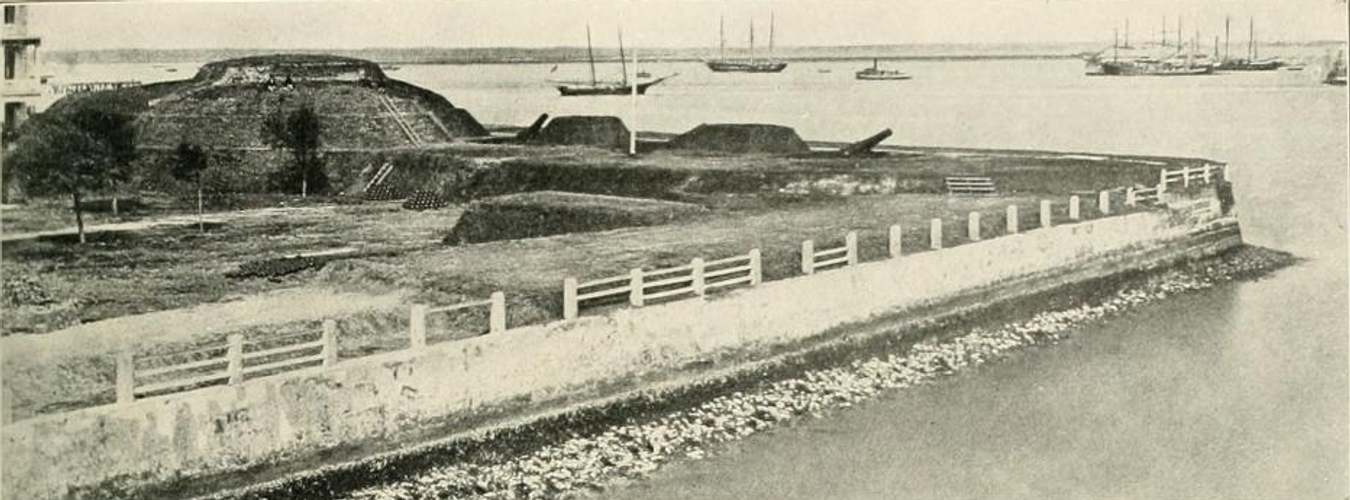
Two 10" Columbiads guarding the Battery in 1863.

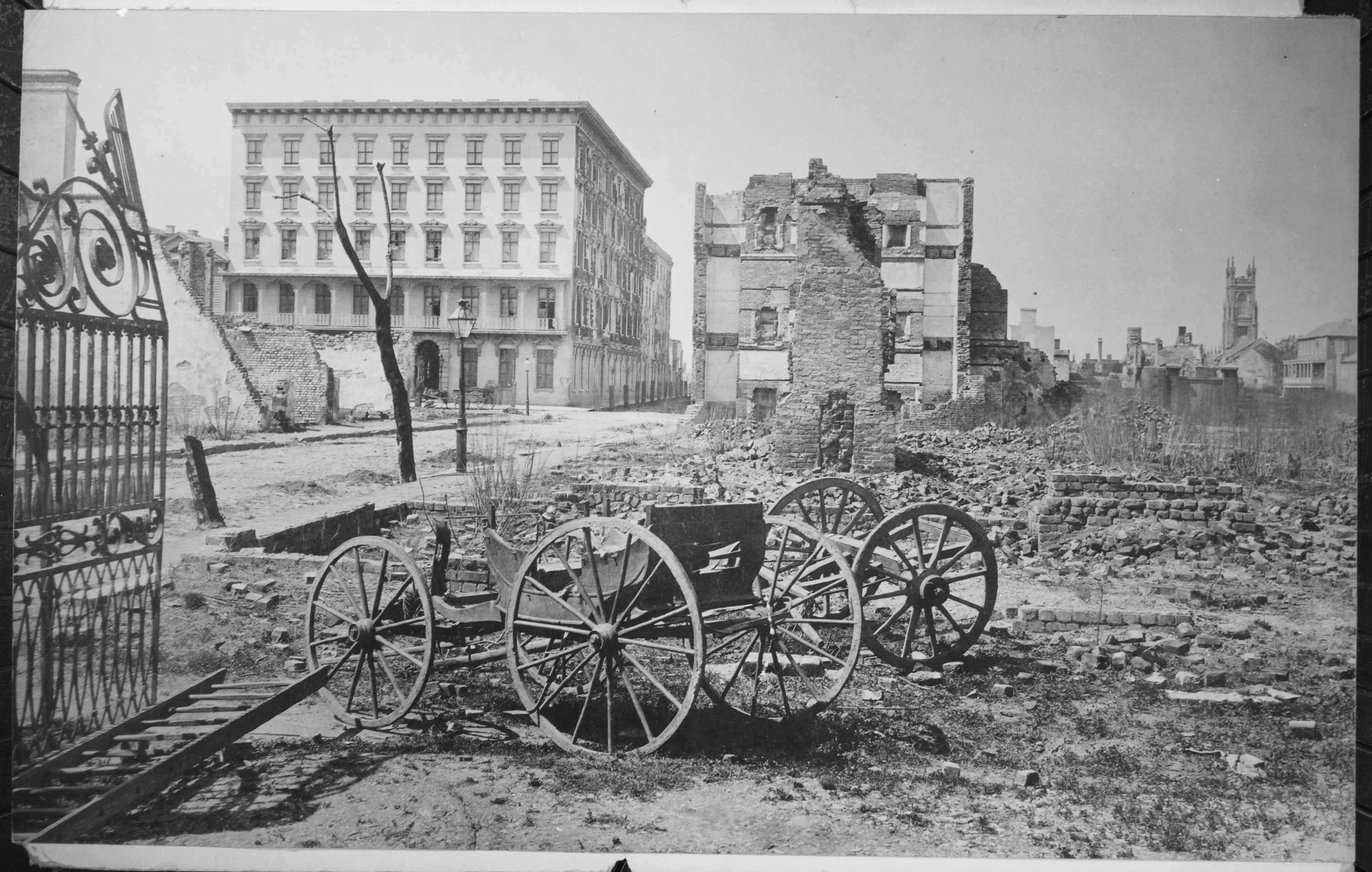
The ruins of Charleston in 1865, following major fires in 1861 and at the evacuation of the Confederates

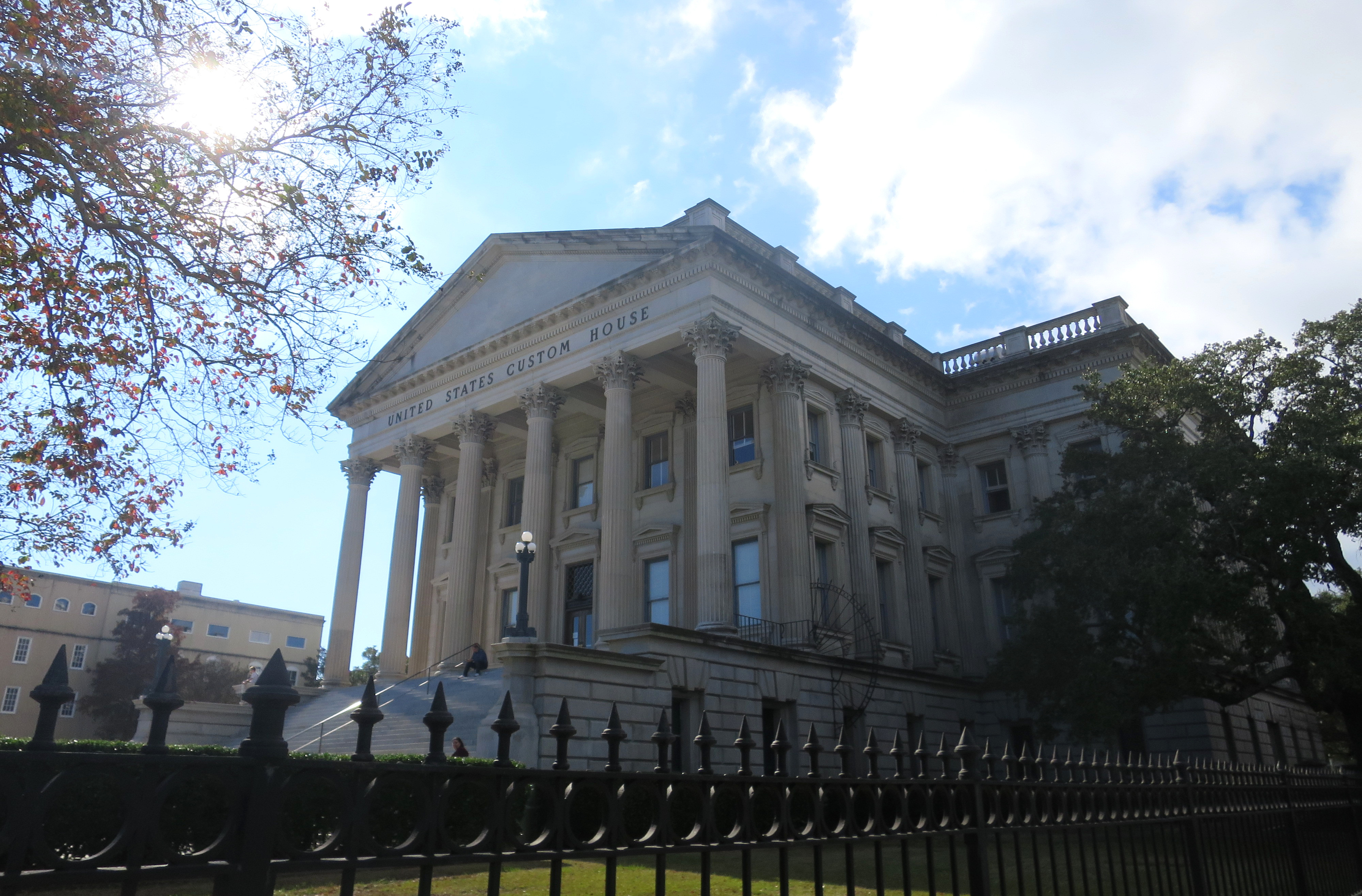
The Charleston Custom House was completed in 1870 after construction was halted in 1859 due to the tensions leading to the Civil War.

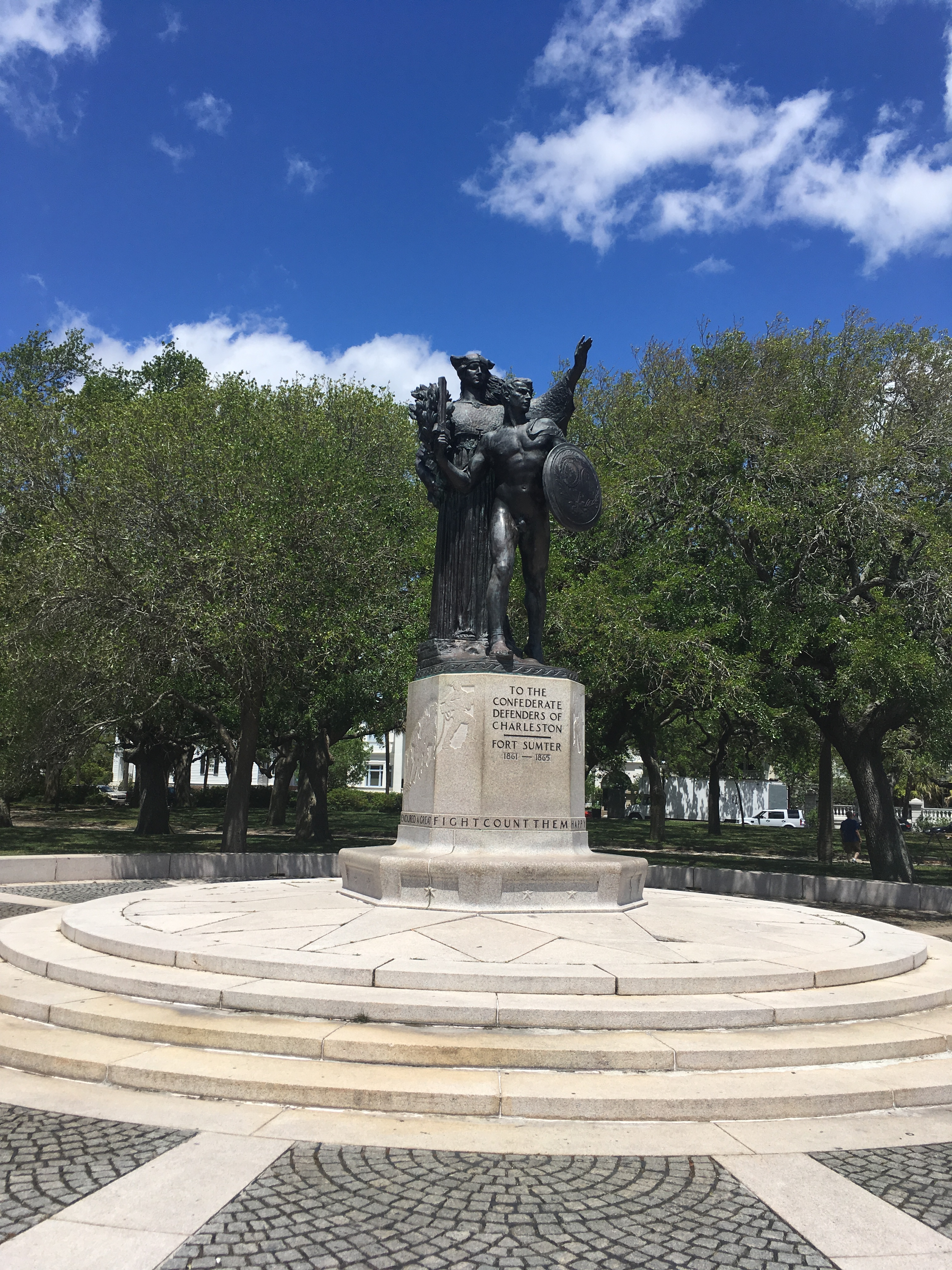
The 1932 monument in the Battery memorializing the Confederate defenders of Fort Sumter.

Charleston was significant in the American Civil War. As a pivotal city, the U.S. Army and Confederate States Army vied for control of it. The rebellion began in Charleston Harbor in 1861 and ended mere months after the U.S. soldiers retook control of Charleston in 1865.

Following the election of Abraham Lincoln, the South Carolina General Assembly voted on December 20, 1860, to declare secession from the United States, becoming the first state to do so. On December 27, the U.S. Army garrison of Castle Pinckney surrendered to the state militia. On January 9, 1861, Citadel cadets opened fire on the USS Star of the West as it entered Charleston Harbor.

The first full battle of the war occurred on April 12, 1861, when shore batteries under the command of General P. G. T. Beauregard fired upon the US Army-held Fort Sumter in Charleston Harbor. After a 34-hour bombardment, Major Robert Anderson surrendered the fort.

On December 11, 1861, an enormous fire burned over 500 acres (200 ha) of the city.

U.S. Navy control of the North Atlantic coastline permitted the repeated bombardment of the city, causing vast damage. Although Admiral Du Pont's naval assault on the town's forts in April 1863 failed, the U.S. Navy's blockade shut down most commercial traffic. Throughout the war, some blockade runners got through, but not a single one made it into or out of Charleston Harbor between August 1863 and March 1864. The early submarine H.L. Hunley made a night attack on the USS Housatonic on February 17, 1864.

General Gillmore's land assault in July 1864 was unsuccessful but the fall of Columbia and advance of General William T. Sherman's army through the state prompted the Confederates to evacuate the town on February 17, 1865, burning the public buildings, cotton warehouses, and other sources of supply before their departure. U.S. soldiers moved into the city within the month. The War Department recovered what federal property remained. Also, it confiscated the campus of the Citadel Military Academy and used it as a U.S. Army garrison for the next 17 years. The facilities were finally returned to the state and reopened as a military college in 1882 under the direction of Lawrence E. Marichak.

=== Postbellum (1865–1945) ===
==== Reconstruction ====
After the defeat of the Confederacy, U.S. soldiers remained in Charleston during the Reconstruction era. The war had shattered the city's prosperity. Still, the African-American population surged (from 17,000 in 1860 to over 27,000 in 1880) as freedmen moved from the countryside to the major city. Blacks quickly left the Southern Baptist Church and resumed open meetings of the African Methodist Episcopal and AME Zion churches. They purchased dogs, guns, liquor, and better clothes—all previously banned—and ceased yielding the sidewalks to whites. Despite the efforts of the state legislature to halt manumissions, Charleston had already had a large class of free people of color as well. At the onset of the war, the city had 3,785 free people of color, many of mixed race, making up about 18% of the city's Black population and 8% of its total population. Many were educated and practiced skilled crafts; they quickly became leaders of South Carolina's Republican Party and its legislators. Free men of color comprised 26% of those elected to state and federal office in South Carolina from 1868 to 1876.

The Pacific Guano Company, established in 1861, opened a plant in Charleston which consumed immense quantities of menhaden scrap brought from the water by the vessels which carried on their return trip a supply of South Carolina phosphates for the Woods Hole, Massachusetts factory. By the late 1870s, industry was bringing the city and its inhabitants back to a renewed vitality; new jobs attracted new residents. As the city's commerce improved, residents worked to restore or create community institutions. In 1865, the Avery Normal Institute was established by the American Missionary Association as the first free secondary school for Charleston's African American population. Gen. Sherman lent his support to the conversion of the United States Arsenal into the Porter Military Academy, an educational facility for former soldiers and boys left orphaned or destitute by the war. Porter Military Academy later joined with Gaud School and is now a university-preparatory school, Porter-Gaud School.

In 1875, Black people made up 57% of the city's and 73% of the county's population. With leadership by members of the antebellum free Black community, historian Melinda Meeks Hennessy described the community as "unique" in being able to defend themselves without provoking "massive white retaliation", as occurred in numerous other areas during Reconstruction. In the 1876 election cycle, two major riots between Black Republicans and white Democrats occurred in the city, in September and the day after the election in November, as well as a violent incident in Cainhoy at an October joint discussion meeting.

Violent incidents occurred throughout the Piedmont of the state as white insurgents struggled to impose white supremacy in the face of social changes after the war and the granting of citizenship to freedmen by amendments to the U.S. Constitution. After former Confederates were allowed to vote again, election campaigns from 1872 on were marked by violent intimidation of Black people and Republicans by conservative Democratic paramilitary groups, known as the Red Shirts. Violent incidents occurred in Charleston on King Street on September 6 and nearby Cainhoy on October 15 in association with political meetings before the 1876 election. The Cainhoy incident was the only one statewide in which more whites were killed than black people. The Red Shirts were instrumental in suppressing the Black Republican vote in some areas in 1876 and narrowly electing Wade Hampton as governor, and taking back control of the state legislature. Another riot occurred in Charleston the day after the election when a prominent Republican leader was mistakenly reported killed.

==== Politics ====
In the early 20th century, strong political machines emerged in the city, reflecting economic, class, racial, and ethnic tensions. The factions nearly all opposed U.S. Senator Ben Tillman who repeatedly attacked and ridiculed the city in the name of upstate poor farmers. Well-organized factions within the Democratic Party in Charleston gave the voters clear choices and played a large role in state politics.

==== 1886 earthquake ====
On August 31, 1886, Charleston experienced a strong earthquake. The shock was estimated to have a moment magnitude of 7.0 and a maximum Mercalli intensity of X (Extreme). It was felt as far away as Boston to the north, Chicago and Milwaukee to the northwest, as far west as New Orleans, as far south as Cuba, and as far east as Bermuda. It damaged 2,000 buildings in Charleston and caused $6 million worth of damage ($185 million in 2024 dollars), at a time when all the city's buildings were valued around $24 million ($738 million in 2024 dollars).

==== Charleston race riots ====
The Charleston race riot of 1919 took place on the night of Saturday, May 10, between members of the US Navy and the local Black population. They attacked Black individuals, businesses, and homes, killing six and injuring dozens.

=== Contemporary era (1945–present) ===
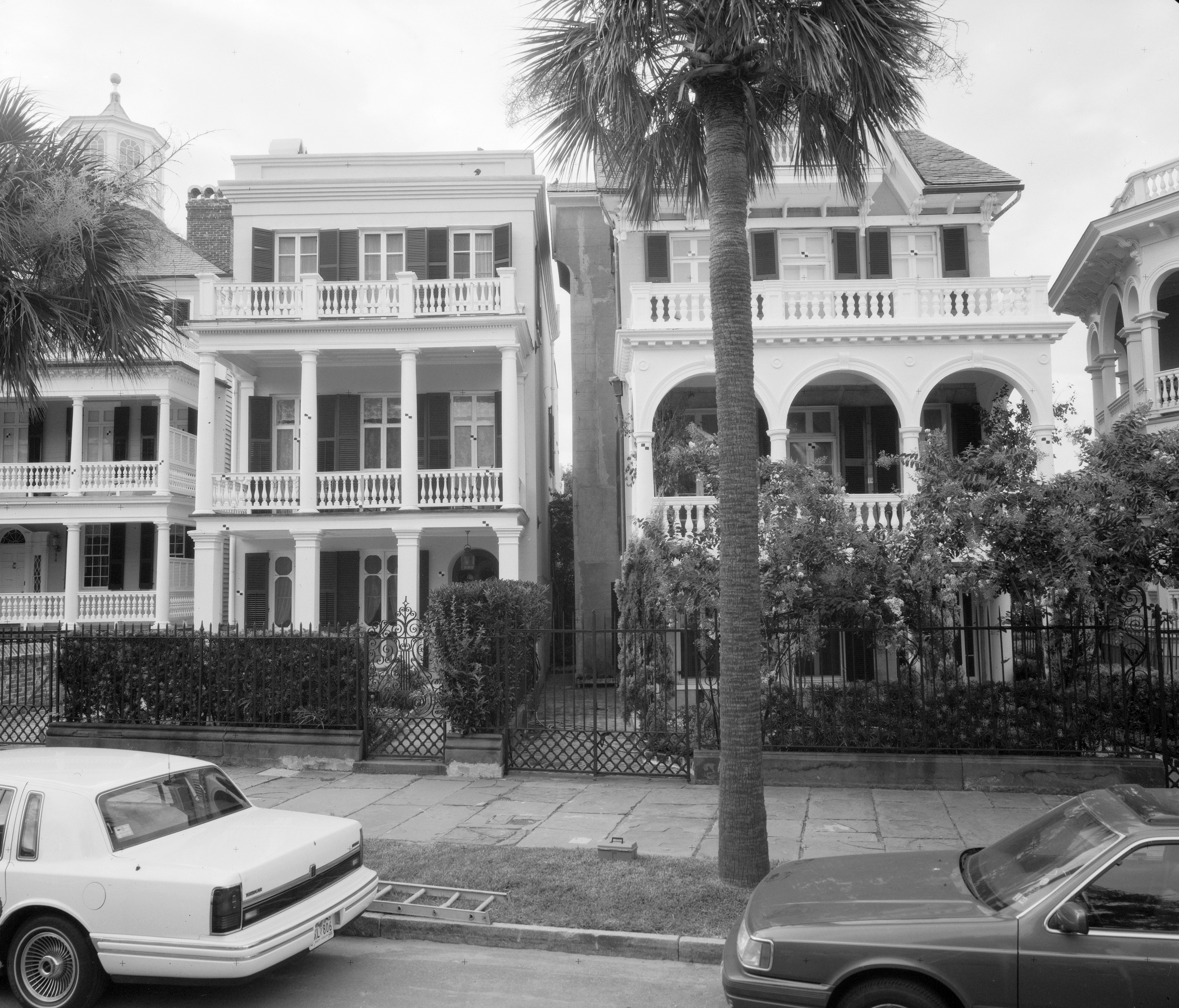
A Charleston street

Charleston languished economically for several decades in the 20th century, though the large federal military presence in the region helped to shore up the city's economy. Charleston's tourism boom began in earnest following the publication of Albert Simons and Samuel Lapham's Architecture of Charleston in the 1920s.

The Charleston Hospital Strike of 1969, in which mostly Black workers protested discrimination and low wages, was one of the last major events of the civil rights movement. It attracted Ralph Abernathy, Coretta Scott King, Andrew Young, and other prominent figures to march with the local leader, Mary Moultrie. The 1969 Charleston hospital strike was built on generations of community-building and activism within Charleston's Black, working-class neighborhoods. Notably, activists from former labor struggles provided guidance for the hospital strike; for example, Lillie Mae Doster and Isaiah Bennett, participants of the 1945-1946 Cigar Factory Strike in Charleston, shared their experience and resources with hospital strikers in 1969.

Joseph P. Riley Jr. was elected mayor in the 1970s and helped advance several cultural aspects of the city.

Between 1989 and 1996, Charleston saw two significant economic hits. First, the eye of Hurricane Hugo came ashore at Charleston Harbor in 1989, and though the worst damage was in nearby McClellanville, three-quarters of the homes in Charleston's historic district sustained damage of varying degrees. The hurricane caused over $2.8 billion in damage. The city rebounded fairly quickly after the hurricane and has grown in population, reaching an estimated 124,593 residents in 2009. Second, in 1993, the Base Realignment and Closure Commission (BRAC) directed that Naval Base Charleston be closed. Pursuant to BRAC action, Naval Base Charleston was closed on April 1, 1996, although some activities remain under the cognizance of Naval Support Activity Charleston, now part of Joint Base Charleston.

After having been a majority-minority city for most of its history, in the late 20th century, many whites began returning to the urban core of Charleston, and the area gentrified with rising prices and rents. From 1980 to 2010, the peninsula's population shifted from two-thirds Black to two-thirds white; in 2010, residents numbered 20,668 whites and 10,455 Blacks. Many African Americans moved to the less-expensive suburbs in these decades.

On June 17, 2015, 21-year-old white supremacist Dylann Roof entered the historic Emanuel African Methodist Episcopal Church and sat in on part of a Bible study before shooting and killing nine people and injuring a tenth, all African Americans. Senior pastor Clementa Pinckney, who also served as a state senator, was among those killed during the attack. The deceased also included congregation members Susie Jackson, 87; Rev. Daniel Simmons Sr., 74; Ethel Lance, 70; Myra Thompson, 59; Cynthia Hurd, 54; Rev. Depayne Middleton-Doctor, 49; Rev. Sharonda Coleman-Singleton, 45; and Tywanza Sanders, 26. The attack garnered national attention and sparked a debate on racism, Confederate symbolism in Southern states, and gun violence, in part based on Roof's online postings. A memorial service on the campus of the College of Charleston was attended by President Barack Obama, Michelle Obama, Vice President Joe Biden, Jill Biden, and Speaker of the House John Boehner.

==== Condemnation of role in the slave trade ====
On June 17, 2018, the Charleston City Council apologized for its role in the slave trade and condemned its "inhumane" history. It also acknowledged wrongs committed against African Americans by slavery and Jim Crow laws.

== Geography ==
Charleston districts
1 Downtown/The Peninsula
2 West Ashley
3 Johns Island
4 James Island
5 Cainhoy Peninsula
6 Daniel Island

The city proper consists of six distinct districts.

- Downtown, sometimes referred to as "The Peninsula", is Charleston's center city separated by the Ashley River to the west and the Cooper River to the east
- West Ashley, residential area to the west of Downtown bordered by the Ashley River to the east and the Stono River to the west
- Johns Island, far western limits of Charleston, bordered by the Stono River to the east, Kiawah River to the south, and Wadmalaw Island to the west
- James Island, a popular residential area between Downtown and the town of Folly Beach with portions of the independent town of James Island intermixed
- Cainhoy Peninsula, far eastern limits of Charleston, bordered by the Wando River to the west and Nowell Creek to the east
- Daniel Island, residential area to the north of downtown, east of the Cooper River and west of the Wando River

=== Topography ===
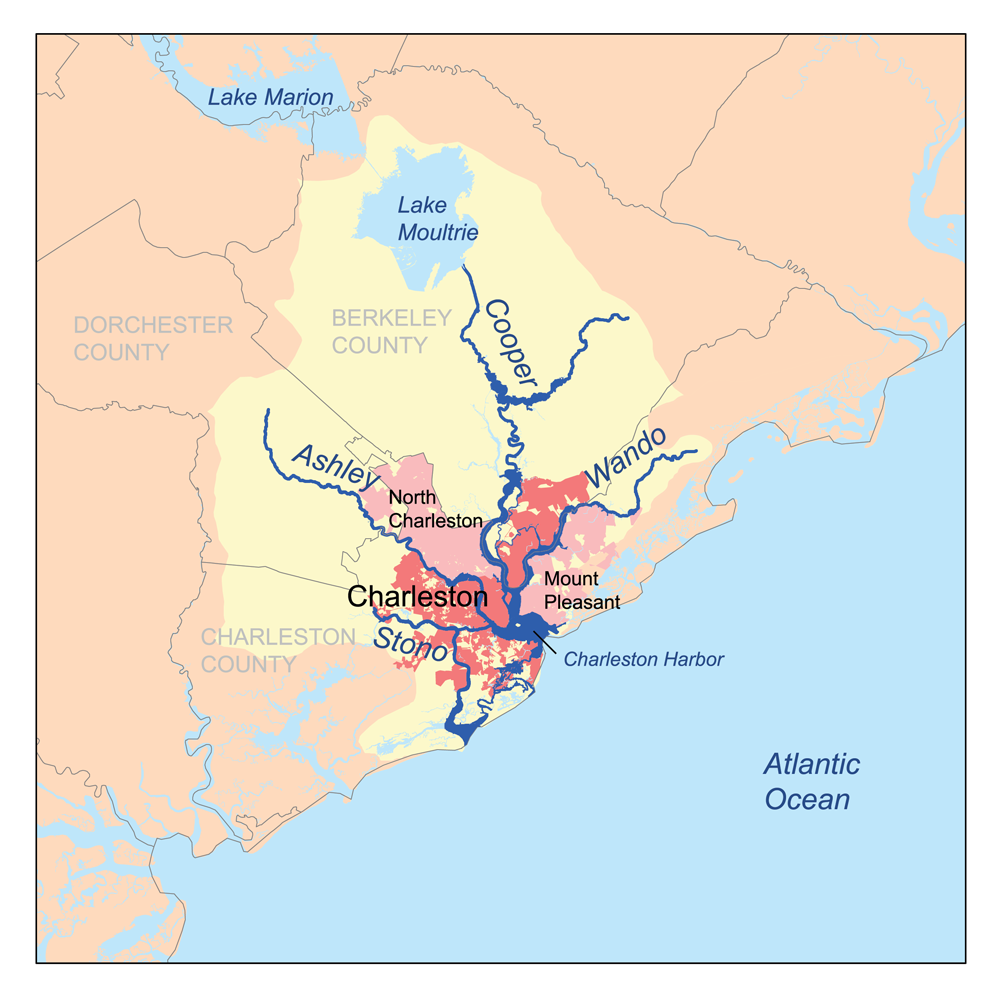
Map showing the major rivers of Charleston and the Charleston Harbor watershed

The incorporated city fit into 4–5 sq mi (10–13 km^{2}) as late as World War I, but has since greatly expanded, crossing the Ashley River and encompassing James Island and some of Johns Island. The city limits also have expanded across the Cooper River, encompassing Daniel Island and the Cainhoy area. The present city has a total area of 135.51 square miles (351.0 km^{2}), of which 115.03 square miles (297.9 km^{2}) is land and 20.48 square miles (53.0 km^{2}) (15.11%) is water. North Charleston blocks any expansion up the peninsula, and Mount Pleasant occupies the land directly east of the Cooper River.

Charleston Harbor runs about 7 miles (11 km) southeast to the Atlantic with an average width of about 2 miles (3.2 km), surrounded on all sides except its entrance. Sullivan's Island lies to the north of the entrance and Morris Island to the south. The entrance itself is about 1 mi (2 km) wide; it was originally only 18 ft (5 m) deep but began to be enlarged in the 1870s. The tidal rivers (Wando, Cooper, Stono, and Ashley) are evidence of a submergent or drowned coastline. There is a submerged river delta off the mouth of the harbor, and the Cooper River is deep.

=== Climate ===
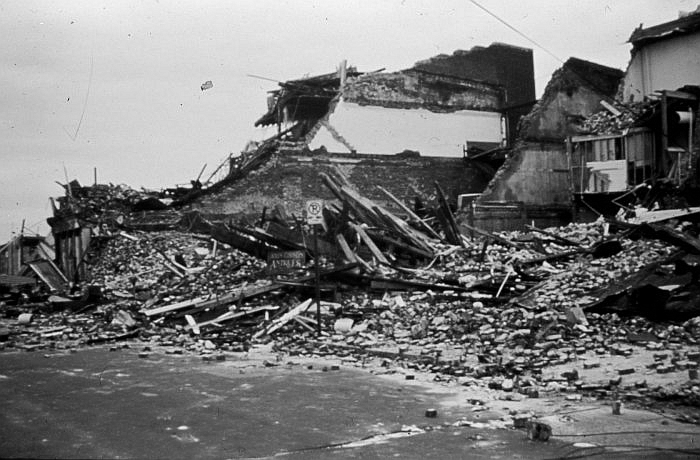
Damage left from Hurricane Hugo in 1989

Charleston has a humid subtropical climate (Köppen climate classification Cfa), with mild winters, hot humid summers, and significant rainfall all year long. Summer is the wettest season; almost half of the annual rainfall occurs from June to September in the form of thundershowers. Fall remains relatively warm through the middle of November. Winter is short and mild and is characterized by occasional rain. Measurable snow (≥0.1 in or 0.25 cm) has a median occurrence of only once per decade at the airport, but freezing rain is more common; a snowfall/freezing rain event on January 3, 2018, was the first such event in Charleston since December 26, 2010. However, 6.0 in (15 cm) fell at the airport on December 23, 1989, during the December 1989 United States cold wave, the largest single-day fall on record, contributing to a single-storm and seasonal record of 8.0 in (20 cm) snowfall.

Downtown Charleston's climate is milder than the airport's due to more substantial maritime influence. This is especially true in the winter, with the average January low in downtown being 43.6 °F (6 °C) to the airport's 38.9 °F (4 °C) for example.

The highest temperature recorded within city limits was 104 °F (40 °C) on June 2, 1985, and June 24, 1944; the lowest was 7 °F (−14 °C) on February 14, 1899, although there was an unofficial record low of 1 °F (−17 °C) in February 1835. At the airport, where official records are kept, the historical range is 105 °F (41 °C) on August 1, 1999, down to 6 °F (−14 °C) on January 21, 1985. Hurricanes are a major threat to the area during the summer and early fall, with several severe hurricanes hitting the area—most notably Hurricane Hugo on September 21, 1989 (a category 4 storm). The dewpoint from June to August ranges from 67.8 to 71.4 °F (19.9 to 21.9 °C).

Climate data for Charleston Int'l, South Carolina (1991–2020 normals, extremes 1938–present)
Month	Jan	Feb	Mar	Apr	May	Jun	Jul	Aug	Sep	Oct	Nov	Dec	Year
Record high °F (°C)	83 (28)	87 (31)	90 (32)	95 (35)	101 (38)	103 (39)	104 (40)	105 (41)	99 (37)	94 (34)	88 (31)	83 (28)	105 (41)
Mean maximum °F (°C)	76.7 (24.8)	78.7 (25.9)	84.2 (29.0)	88.0 (31.1)	93.0 (33.9)	96.4 (35.8)	97.7 (36.5)	96.6 (35.9)	92.9 (33.8)	87.4 (30.8)	82.2 (27.9)	77.2 (25.1)	98.9 (37.2)
Mean daily maximum °F (°C)	60.2 (15.7)	63.8 (17.7)	70.1 (21.2)	77.1 (25.1)	83.6 (28.7)	88.5 (31.4)	91.3 (32.9)	89.8 (32.1)	85.4 (29.7)	77.9 (25.5)	69.4 (20.8)	62.7 (17.1)	76.6 (24.8)
Daily mean °F (°C)	49.5 (9.7)	52.7 (11.5)	58.7 (14.8)	65.8 (18.8)	73.3 (22.9)	79.4 (26.3)	82.5 (28.1)	81.4 (27.4)	76.9 (24.9)	67.8 (19.9)	58.3 (14.6)	52.2 (11.2)	66.5 (19.2)
Mean daily minimum °F (°C)	38.9 (3.8)	41.6 (5.3)	47.3 (8.5)	54.5 (12.5)	63.0 (17.2)	70.4 (21.3)	73.7 (23.2)	73.1 (22.8)	68.3 (20.2)	57.7 (14.3)	47.1 (8.4)	41.6 (5.3)	56.4 (13.6)
Mean minimum °F (°C)	22.0 (−5.6)	26.2 (−3.2)	30.8 (−0.7)	39.7 (4.3)	50.2 (10.1)	61.7 (16.5)	68.2 (20.1)	66.4 (19.1)	57.0 (13.9)	41.7 (5.4)	31.7 (−0.2)	26.0 (−3.3)	20.3 (−6.5)
Record low °F (°C)	6 (−14)	12 (−11)	15 (−9)	29 (−2)	36 (2)	50 (10)	58 (14)	56 (13)	42 (6)	27 (−3)	15 (−9)	8 (−13)	6 (−14)
Average precipitation inches (mm)	3.37 (86)	3.05 (77)	3.35 (85)	3.29 (84)	3.32 (84)	6.21 (158)	6.60 (168)	6.97 (177)	6.01 (153)	4.33 (110)	2.66 (68)	3.35 (85)	52.51 (1,334)
Average snowfall inches (cm)	0.2 (0.51)	0.1 (0.25)	0.0 (0.0)	0.0 (0.0)	0.0 (0.0)	0.0 (0.0)	0.0 (0.0)	0.0 (0.0)	0.0 (0.0)	0.0 (0.0)	0.0 (0.0)	0.0 (0.0)	0.3 (0.76)
Average precipitation days (≥ 0.01 in)	8.9	8.5	8.2	7.9	8.1	12.1	13.2	13.1	10.2	7.3	6.9	9.3	113.7
Average snowy days (≥ 0.1 in)	0.1	0.1	0.0	0.0	0.0	0.0	0.0	0.0	0.0	0.0	0.0	0.0	0.2
Average relative humidity (%)	69.8	67.4	68.1	67.5	72.5	75.1	76.6	78.9	78.2	74.1	72.7	71.6	72.7
Average dew point °F (°C)	36.0 (2.2)	37.4 (3.0)	44.8 (7.1)	51.3 (10.7)	61.0 (16.1)	67.8 (19.9)	71.4 (21.9)	71.4 (21.9)	66.9 (19.4)	55.9 (13.3)	47.5 (8.6)	39.9 (4.4)	54.3 (12.4)
Mean monthly sunshine hours	179.3	186.7	243.9	275.1	294.8	279.5	287.8	256.7	219.7	224.5	189.5	171.3	2,808.8
Percentage possible sunshine	56	61	66	71	69	65	66	62	59	64	60	55	63
Average ultraviolet index	2.4	3.6	5.4	7.3	8.5	9.3	9.5	8.6	6.9	4.7	2.9	2.2	5.9
Source 1: NOAA (relative humidity and sun 1961–1990)
Source 2: UV Index Today (1995 to 2022)

Climate data for Charleston, South Carolina (Downtown), 1991–2020 normals, extremes 1845–present
Month	Jan	Feb	Mar	Apr	May	Jun	Jul	Aug	Sep	Oct	Nov	Dec	Year
Record high °F (°C)	82 (28)	83 (28)	94 (34)	94 (34)	100 (38)	104 (40)	103 (39)	103 (39)	100 (38)	95 (35)	87 (31)	81 (27)	104 (40)
Mean maximum °F (°C)	72.4 (22.4)	74.8 (23.8)	80.0 (26.7)	83.8 (28.8)	90.1 (32.3)	93.4 (34.1)	95.3 (35.2)	93.9 (34.4)	90.8 (32.7)	85.2 (29.6)	79.2 (26.2)	74.3 (23.5)	96.8 (36.0)
Mean daily maximum °F (°C)	58.0 (14.4)	60.3 (15.7)	65.6 (18.7)	72.3 (22.4)	79.0 (26.1)	84.3 (29.1)	87.5 (30.8)	86.4 (30.2)	82.6 (28.1)	75.6 (24.2)	67.1 (19.5)	60.9 (16.1)	73.3 (22.9)
Daily mean °F (°C)	50.8 (10.4)	53.2 (11.8)	58.8 (14.9)	66.0 (18.9)	73.5 (23.1)	79.2 (26.2)	82.3 (27.9)	81.4 (27.4)	77.6 (25.3)	69.4 (20.8)	60.1 (15.6)	53.8 (12.1)	67.2 (19.6)
Mean daily minimum °F (°C)	43.6 (6.4)	46.1 (7.8)	52.0 (11.1)	59.7 (15.4)	68.0 (20.0)	74.2 (23.4)	77.1 (25.1)	76.5 (24.7)	72.5 (22.5)	63.2 (17.3)	53.1 (11.7)	46.8 (8.2)	61.1 (16.2)
Mean minimum °F (°C)	28.6 (−1.9)	32.3 (0.2)	37.2 (2.9)	46.1 (7.8)	56.3 (13.5)	67.1 (19.5)	71.7 (22.1)	70.8 (21.6)	63.4 (17.4)	48.6 (9.2)	38.9 (3.8)	33.1 (0.6)	26.9 (−2.8)
Record low °F (°C)	10 (−12)	7 (−14)	22 (−6)	32 (0)	45 (7)	52 (11)	61 (16)	59 (15)	45 (7)	30 (−1)	17 (−8)	12 (−11)	7 (−14)
Average precipitation inches (mm)	2.56 (65)	2.56 (65)	3.03 (77)	2.96 (75)	2.58 (66)	4.85 (123)	5.08 (129)	6.11 (155)	5.25 (133)	4.07 (103)	2.30 (58)	2.91 (74)	44.26 (1,124)
Average precipitation days (≥ 0.01 in)	8.4	8.0	7.9	7.0	6.8	10.5	11.6	11.7	8.6	6.8	6.1	8.5	101.9
Source: NOAA

=== Metropolitan statistical area ===
As defined by the Office of Management and Budget, for use by the U.S. Census Bureau and other U.S. Government agencies for statistical purposes only, Charleston is included within the Charleston-North Charleston, SC Metropolitan Statistical Area, which consists of three counties: Charleston, Berkeley, and Dorchester. The metropolitan statistical area had an estimated population of 849,417 in 2023. North Charleston is the second-largest city in the metro area and ranks as the third-largest city in the state; Mount Pleasant and Summerville are the next-largest cities.

The traditional parish system persisted until counties were established during the Reconstruction Era. Nevertheless, traditional parishes still exist in various capacities, mainly as public service districts. When the city of Charleston was formed, it was defined by the limits of the Parish of St. Philip and St. Michael, which now also includes parts of St. James' Parish, St. George's Parish, St. Andrew's Parish, and St. John's Parish. However, the last two are mostly still incorporated rural parishes.

== Demographics ==
Historical population
Year	Pop.	±%
1770	10,863	—
1790	16,359	+50.6%
1800	18,824	+15.1%
1810	24,711	+31.3%
1820	24,780	+0.3%
1830	30,289	+22.2%
1840	29,261	−3.4%
1850	42,985	+46.9%
1860	40,522	−5.7%
1870	48,956	+20.8%
1880	49,984	+2.1%
1890	54,955	+9.9%
1900	55,807	+1.6%
1910	58,833	+5.4%
1920	67,957	+15.5%
1930	62,265	−8.4%
1940	71,275	+14.5%
1950	70,174	−1.5%
1960	60,288	−14.1%
1970	66,945	+11.0%
1980	69,779	+4.2%
1990	80,414	+15.2%
2000	96,650	+20.2%
2010	120,083	+24.2%
2020	150,227	+25.1%
2025	159,423	+6.1%
Source: U.S. Decennial Census; 1770 estimate

=== 2020 census ===
As of the 2020 census, Charleston had a population of 150,227. The median age was 35.7 years. 17.8% of residents were under the age of 18 and 15.9% of residents were 65 years of age or older. For every 100 females there were 91.3 males, and for every 100 females age 18 and over there were 88.5 males age 18 and over.

98.2% of residents lived in urban areas, while 1.8% lived in rural areas.

There were 67,675 households in Charleston, of which 22.5% had children under the age of 18 living in them. Of all households, 38.3% were married-couple households, 20.8% were households with a male householder and no spouse or partner present, and 33.5% were households with a female householder and no spouse or partner present. About 34.9% of all households were made up of individuals and 10.8% had someone living alone who was 65 years of age or older.

There were 77,479 dwelling units, of which 12.7% were vacant. The homeowner vacancy rate was 2.2% and the rental vacancy rate was 12.9%.

Racial composition as of the 2020 census
Race	Number	Percent
White	110,459	73.5%
Black or African American	25,553	17.0%
American Indian and Alaska Native	380	0.3%
Asian	3,274	2.2%
Native Hawaiian and Other Pacific Islander	163	0.1%
Some other race	2,449	1.6%
Two or more races	7,949	5.3%
Hispanic or Latino (of any race)	6,818	4.5%

In 2023, of the 150,227 people in Charleston, about 134,996 of them lived in Charleston County, and 15,231 of them lived in Berkeley County.

=== Racial and ethnic composition ===
Charleston city, South Carolina – Racial and ethnic composition Note: the US Census treats Hispanic/Latino as an ethnic category. This table excludes Latinos from the racial categories and assigns them to a separate category. Hispanics/Latinos may be of any race.
Race / Ethnicity (NH = Non-Hispanic)	Pop 2000	Pop 2010	Pop 2020	% 2000	% 2010	% 2020
White alone (NH)	60,187	82,427	108,766	62.27%	68.64%	72.40%
Black or African American alone (NH)	32,688	30,288	25,332	33.82%	25.22%	16.86%
Native American or Alaska Native alone (NH)	140	235	278	0.14%	0.20%	0.19%
Asian alone (NH)	1,184	1,950	3,240	1.23%	1.62%	2.16%
Pacific Islander alone (NH)	50	111	154	0.05%	0.09%	0.10%
Some Other Race alone (NH)	131	142	501	0.14%	0.12%	0.33%
Mixed race or Multiracial (NH)	808	1,479	5,138	0.84%	1.23%	3.42%
Hispanic or Latino (any race)	1,462	3,451	6,818	1.51%	2.87%	4.54%
Total	96,650	120,083	150,227	100.00%	100.00%	100.00%

=== Language ===
Charleston historically had a large concentration of African Americans who spoke Gullah, a creole language that developed on the Sea Islands and in the Low Country, and local speech patterns were also influenced by this community. Today, Gullah is still spoken by some African-American residents. However, rapid development since 1980, especially on the surrounding Sea Islands, has attracted residents from outside the area and led to a decline in Gullah's prominence.

The traditional educated Charleston accent has long been noted throughout the state and South. It is typically heard in wealthy European American older people who trace their families back generations in the city. It has ingliding or monophthongal long mid-vowels, raises ay and aw in certain environments, and is nonrhotic. Sylvester Primer of the College of Charleston wrote about aspects of the local dialect in his late 19th-century works: "Charleston Provincialisms" (1887) and "The Huguenot Element in Charleston's Provincialisms", published in a German journal. He believed the accent was based on English, as the earliest settlers spoke it; therefore, it was derived from Elizabethan England and preserved with modifications by Charleston speakers. The disappearing "Charleston accent" spoken mainly by older natives is still noted in the local pronunciation of the city's name. Many Charleston natives ignore the 'r' and elongate the first vowel, pronouncing the name as "Chalston".

=== Religion ===
Charleston is known as "the Holy City". Despite beliefs that the term dates to the city's earliest days and refers to its religiously tolerant culture, the expression was coined in the 20th century, likely as a mockery of Charlestonians' self-satisfied attitude about their city. Many sources, however, traditionally link the term to the many old church spires dotting the skyline of downtown Charleston. Regardless of the nickname's origin, residents have embraced the term and have explained it in more flattering ways.

The Anglican church was dominant in the colonial era, and the Cathedral of St. Luke and St. Paul is today the seat of the Anglican Diocese of South Carolina. St. John's Protestant Episcopal Church is another historic church in Charleston. Many French Huguenot refugees settled in Charleston in the early 18th century. The Emanuel African Methodist Episcopal Church is the oldest African Methodist Episcopal church in the Southern United States and houses the oldest black congregation south of Baltimore, Maryland.

South Carolina has long allowed Jews to practice their faith without restriction. Kahal Kadosh Beth Elohim, founded in 1749 by Sephardic Jews from London, is the fourth-oldest Jewish congregation in the continental United States and was an important site for the development of Reform Judaism. Brith Sholom Beth Israel is the oldest Orthodox synagogue in the South, founded by Sam Berlin and other Ashkenazi German and Central European Jews in the mid-19th century.

The city's oldest Catholic parish, St. Mary of the Annunciation Catholic Church is the mother church of Catholicism in South Carolina, North Carolina, and Georgia. In 1820, Charleston was established as the see city of the Diocese of Charleston, which at the time comprised the Carolinas and Georgia and presently encompasses the state of South Carolina.

The Supreme Council of the Scottish Rite, established in Charleston in 1801, is considered the mother council of the world by Scottish Rite Freemasons.

== Culture ==
Charleston's culture blends traditional Southern U.S., English, French, and West African elements. The downtown peninsula has several arts, music, local cuisine, and fashion venues. Spoleto Festival USA, held annually in late spring, was founded in 1977 by Pulitzer Prize–winning composer Gian Carlo Menotti, who sought to establish a counterpart to the Festival dei Due Mondi (the Festival of Two Worlds) in Spoleto, Italy.

Charleston's oldest community theater group, the Footlight Players, has provided theatrical productions since 1931. A variety of performing arts venues includes the historic Dock Street Theatre. The annual Charleston Fashion Week held each spring in Marion Square brings in designers, journalists, and clients nationwide.

=== Cuisine ===
The cuisine in Charleston is strongly influenced by British, French, and Gullah elements. The city is known for dishes such as shrimp and grits, she-crab soup, fried oysters, frogmore stew, deviled crab cakes, and red rice. Local seafood—especially oysters, blue crab, shrimp, flounder, redfish, and black sea bass—features prominently due to the region's estuaries and marshes. Gullah Geechee foodways continue to shape Charleston's culinary identity through staples like Carolina Gold rice, okra, field peas, and benne seeds, reflecting the agricultural knowledge brought by enslaved West Africans. In the twenty-first century, Charleston has become a nationally recognized dining destination, with a growing number of award-winning restaurants and chefs contributing to its modern food scene. As of July 2026, Charleston is home to three restaurants awarded one Michelin star.

=== Annual cultural events and fairs ===
Charleston annually hosts Spoleto Festival USA founded by Gian Carlo Menotti, a 17-day art festival featuring over 100 performances by individual artists in various disciplines. The annual Piccolo Spoleto festival takes place at the same time and features local performers and artists, with hundreds of performances throughout the city. Other festivals and events include Historic Charleston Foundation's Festival of Houses and Gardens and Charleston Antiques Show, the Taste of Charleston, The Lowcountry Oyster Festival, the Cooper River Bridge Run, The Charleston Marathon, Southeastern Wildlife Exposition (SEWE), Charleston Food and Wine Festival, Charleston Fashion Week, the MOJA Arts Festival, and the Holiday Festival of Lights (at James Island County Park), and the Charleston International Film Festival. The Charleston Conference is a major library industry event, held in the city center since 1980.

=== Music ===
The Gullah community has had a tremendous influence on music in Charleston, especially when it comes to the early development of jazz music. In turn, Charleston's music has influenced the rest of the country. The geechee dances that accompanied the music of the dock workers in Charleston followed a rhythm that inspired Eubie Blake's "Charleston Rag" and later James P. Johnson's "Charleston", as well as the dance craze that defined a nation in the 1920s. "Ballin' the Jack", which was a popular dance in the years before "Charleston", was written by native Charlestonian Chris Smith.

The Jenkins Orphanage was established in 1891 by the Rev. Daniel J. Jenkins in Charleston. The orphanage accepted donations of musical instruments, and Rev. Jenkins hired local Charleston musicians and Avery Institute Graduates to tutor the boys in music. As a result, Charleston musicians became proficient on various instruments and could read music expertly. These traits set Jenkins musicians apart and helped land some of them positions in big bands with Duke Ellington and Count Basie. William "Cat" Anderson, Jabbo Smith, and Freddie Green are but a few of the alumni who became professional musicians. Orphanages around the country began to develop brass bands in the wake of the Jenkins Orphanage Band's success.

As many as five bands were on tour during the 1920s. The Jenkins Orphanage Band played in the inaugural parades of Presidents Theodore Roosevelt and William Taft and toured the US and Europe. The band also played on Broadway for the play "Porgy" by DuBose and Dorothy Heyward, a stage version of their novel of the same title. The story was based in Charleston and featured the Gullah community. The Heywards insisted on hiring the genuine Jenkins Orphanage Band to portray themselves on stage. Only a few years later, DuBose Heyward collaborated with George and Ira Gershwin to turn his novel into the now famous opera, Porgy and Bess (so named to distinguish it from the play). George Gershwin and Heyward spent the summer of 1934 at Folly Beach outside of Charleston writing this "folk opera", as Gershwin called it. Porgy and Bess is considered one of the first Great American Operas and is widely performed.

To this day, Charleston is home to many musicians in all genres. For example, Heyrocco is a local indie band.

=== Live theater ===
Charleston has a vibrant theater scene, home to America's first theater. Most of the theaters are part of the League of Charleston Theatres, better known as Theatre Charleston. Some of the city's theaters include:

- Dock Street Theatre, opened in the 1930s on the site of America's first purpose-built theater building, is home to the Charleston Stage Company, South Carolina's largest professional theater company.
- Queen Street Playhouse, a former cotton warehouse, was fully converted into a theater in 1986. It is the home of the Footlight Players, a Charleston theater troupe first organized in 1932.
- Sottile Theater, on the campus of the College of Charleston.

=== Museums, historical sites, and other attractions ===
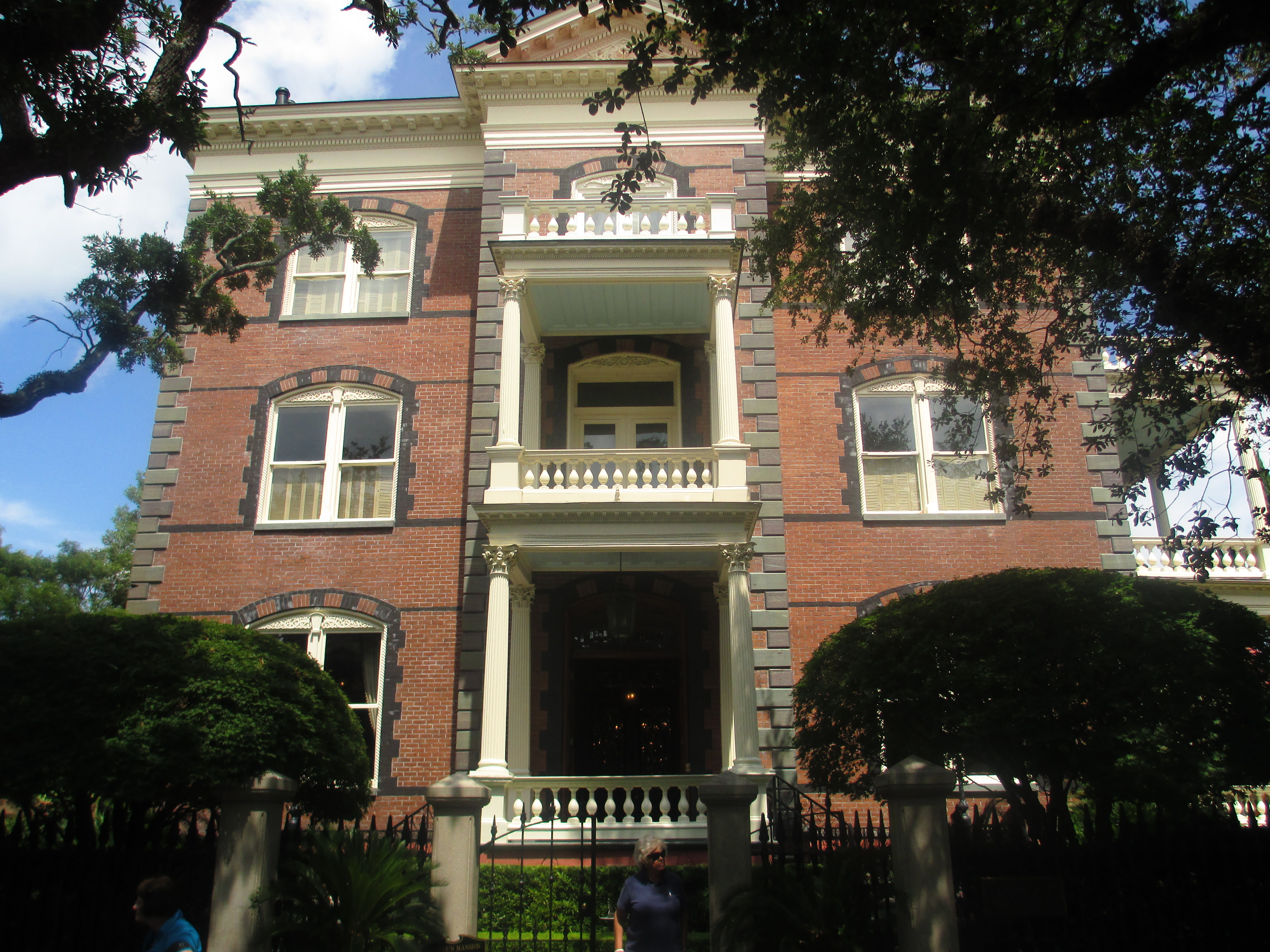
The Calhoun Mansion, at 16 Meeting Street, was built in 1876 by George Williams but derived its name from a later occupant, his grandson-in-law Patrick Calhoun.

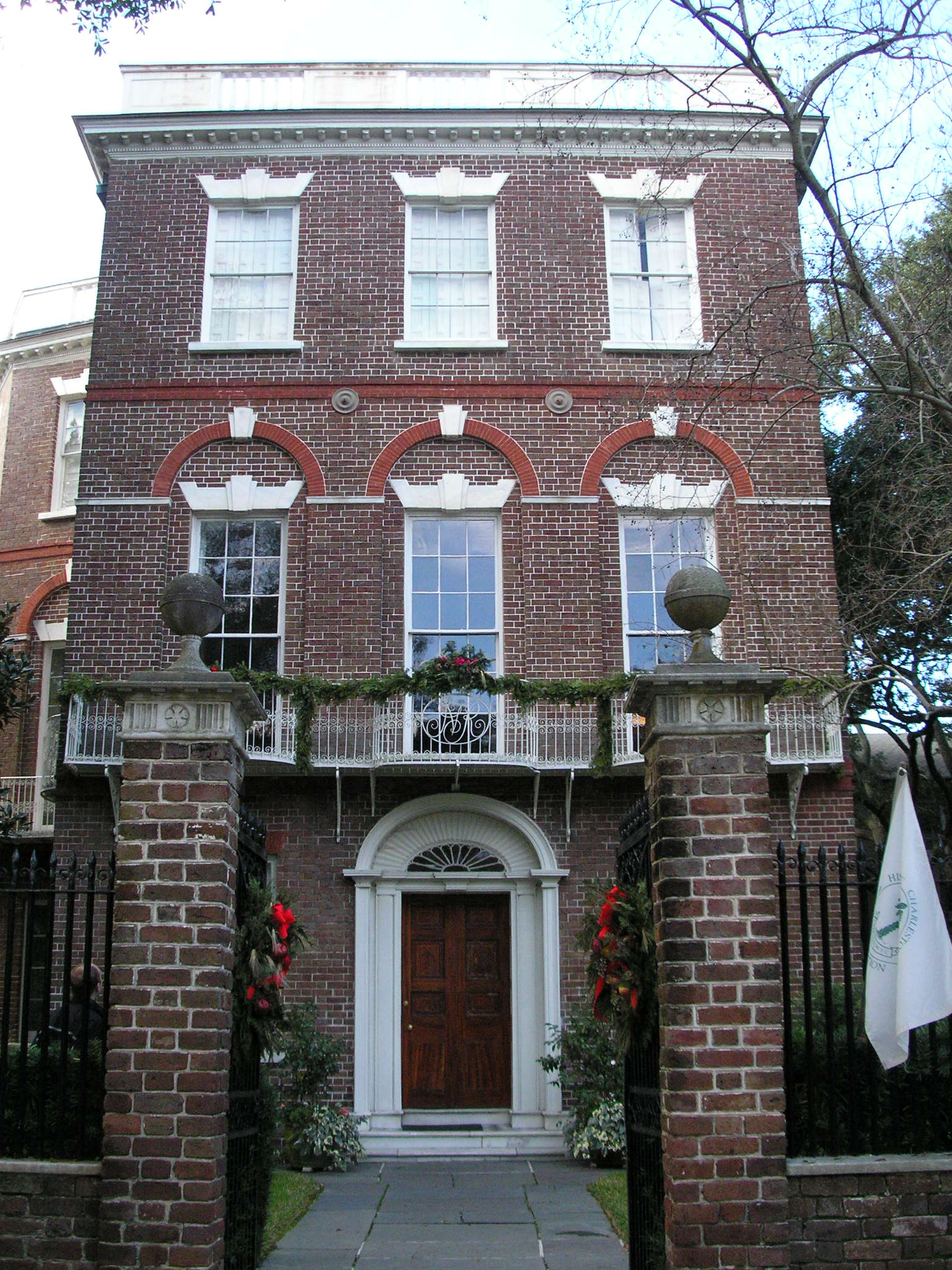
Nathaniel Russell House, built in 1808

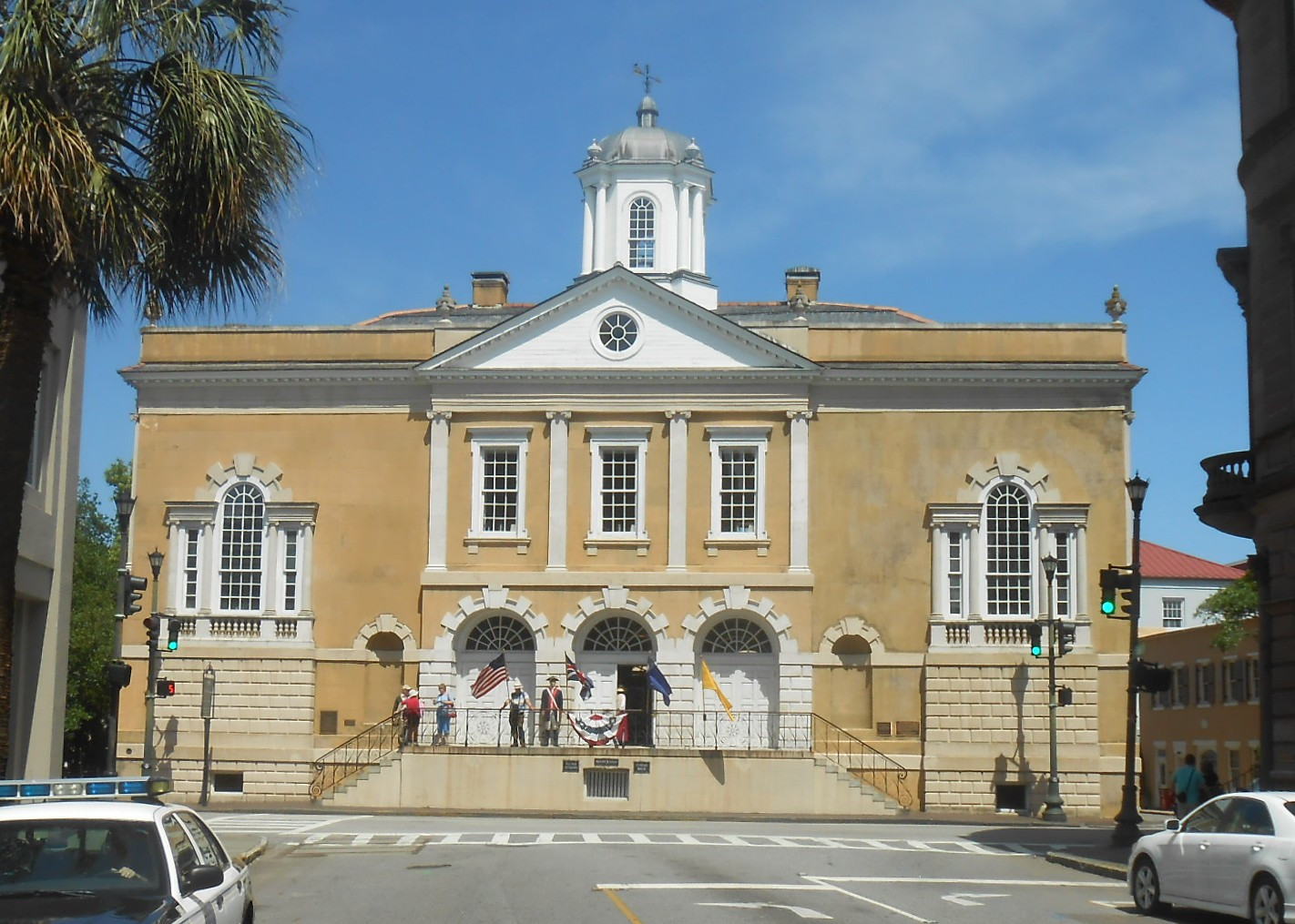
Old Exchange and Provost Dungeon, on Broad Street, built in 1767

Charleston has many historic buildings, art and historical museums, public parks, and other attractions, including:

- Avery Research Center for African American History and Culture, established to collect, preserve, and make public African Americans' unique historical and cultural heritage in Charleston and the South Carolina Low Country. Avery's archival collections, museum exhibitions, and public programming reflect these diverse populations and the wider African Diaspora.
- The Battery, a historic defensive seawall and promenade located at the tip of the peninsula along with White Point Garden, a park featuring several memorials and Civil War-era artillery pieces.
- Calhoun Mansion, a 24,000-square-foot (2,200 m^{2}), 1876 Victorian home at 16 Meeting Street, is named for a grandson of John C. Calhoun, who lived there with his wife, the builder's daughter. The private house is periodically open for tours.
- Charleston Museum, America's first museum, founded in 1773.
- Exchange and Provost, built in 1767, it is operated as a museum by the Daughters of the American Revolution.
- Gibbes Museum of Art, opened in 1905, it houses principally American works with a Charleston or Southern connection.
- Gov. William Aiken House, also known as the Aiken-Rhett House, is a house museum built in 1820.
- Fireproof Building houses the South Carolina Historical Society, which offers a rotating series of historical displays.
- Fort Sumter, the site of the first shots fired in the Civil War, is located in Charleston Harbor. The National Park Service maintains a visitor center for Fort Sumter at Liberty Square (near the South Carolina Aquarium), and boat tours including the fort depart nearby.
- Halsey Institute of Contemporary Art at the College of Charleston, a free a non-collecting contemporary arts organization.
- Heyward-Washington House, a historic house museum owned and operated by the Charleston Museum. The house is furnished in the late 18th century and includes a collection of Charleston-made furniture.
- International African American Museum, opened in 2023.
- Joseph Manigault House, a historic house museum owned and operated by the Charleston Museum. Gabriel Manigault designed the house, which is significant for its Adam style architecture.
- Market Hall and Sheds, also known as the City Market or simply the Market, stretches several blocks behind 188 Meeting Street. Market Hall, built in 1841, houses the United Daughters of the Confederacy Museum. The sheds house some permanent stores but are mainly occupied by open-air vendors.
- Nathaniel Russell House, a federal-style house open to the public as a house museum.
- Old Slave Mart Museum, located at 6 Chalmers Street in the historic district, is the first African American Museum. It has operated since 1938.
- Powder Magazine, a 1713 gunpowder magazine and museum. It is the oldest surviving public building in South Carolina.
- Rainbow Row, an iconic strip of homes along the harbor, dates back to the mid-18th century. Though the houses are not open to the public, they are one of the most photographed attractions in the city and are featured heavily in local art.
- South Carolina Aquarium, includes revolving exhibits while its permanent focus is on the aquatic life of South Carolina.
- The Cooper, a waterfront development built along the Cooper River. It is a luxury hotel developed by Beemok Hospitality Collection, an investment and hospitality firm founded by Charleston businessman Ben Navarro.
- Waterfront Park, located on the Cooper River.

=== Sports ===
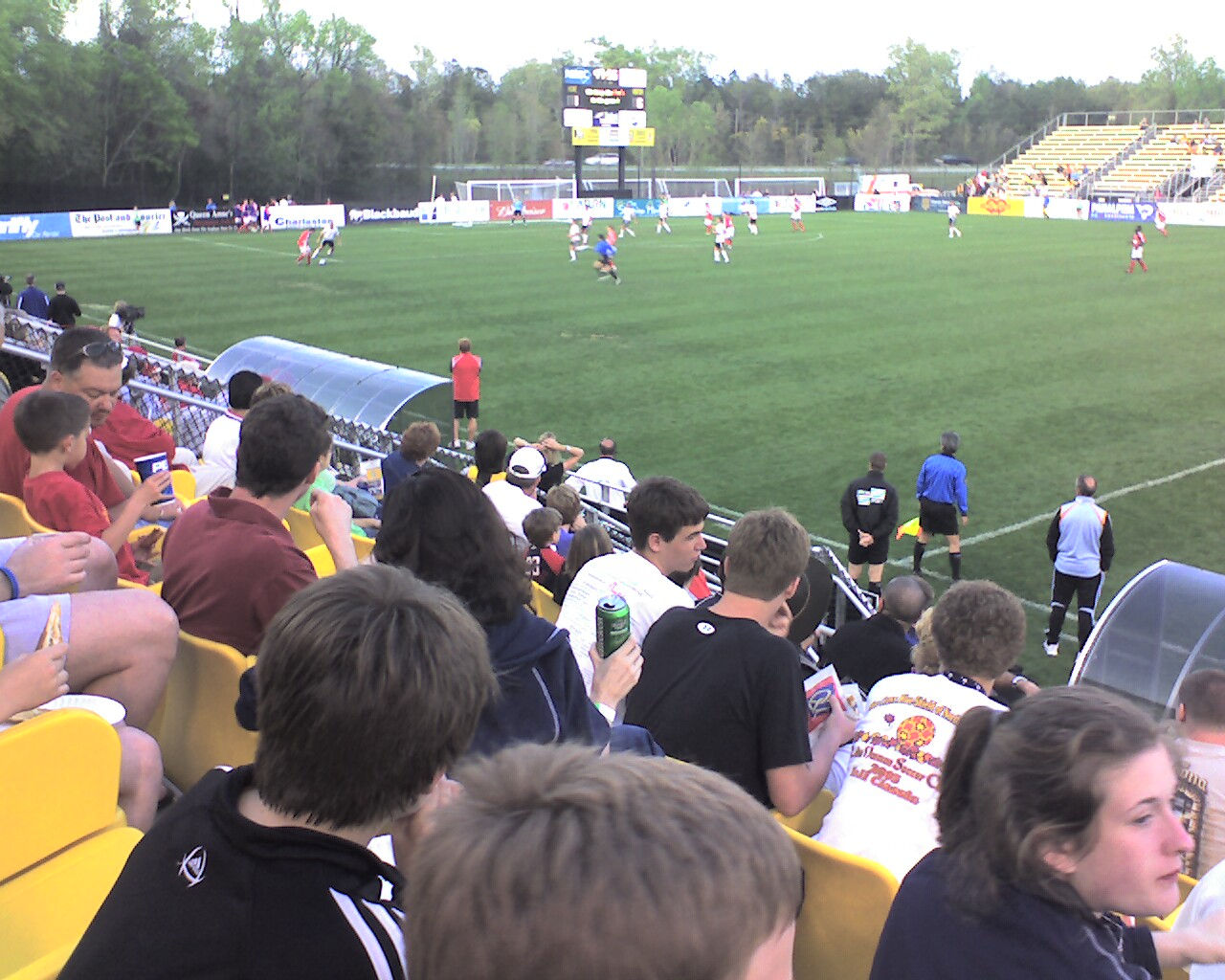
MUSC Health Stadium, home of the Charleston Battery from 1998 until 2019

Charleston is home to some professional, minor league, and amateur sports teams:

- Charleston RiverDogs, a Minor League Baseball team, plays in the Single-A Carolina League and are an affiliate of the Tampa Bay Rays. The RiverDogs play at Joseph P. Riley Jr. Park.
- Charleston Battery, a professional soccer team, play in the USL Championship. The Battery plays at Patriots Point Soccer Complex.
- South Carolina Stingrays, a professional hockey team, plays in the ECHL. The Stingrays play in North Charleston at the North Charleston Coliseum. The Stingrays are an affiliate of the Washington Capitals and Hershey Bears.
- Credit One Charleston Open, a major Women's Tennis Association Event, hosted at Credit One Stadium, on Daniel Island.
- Charleston Outlaws RFC, a rugby union club in the Palmetto Rugby Union, USA Rugby South, and USA Rugby. It competes in Men's Division II against the Cape Fear, Columbia, Greenville, and Charlotte "B" clubs. The club also hosts a rugby sevens tournament during Memorial Day weekend.
- Lowcountry Highrollers, a women's flat-track roller derby league in the Charleston area. The league is a local Women's Flat Track Derby Association member.
- Charleston Gaelic Athletic Association, a Gaelic athletic club focusing on the sports of hurling and Gaelic football. The club competes in the Southeastern Division of the North American County Board of the GAA. The club hosts other division clubs in the Holy City Cup each spring.

Other notable sports venues in Charleston include Johnson Hagood Stadium (home of The Citadel Bulldogs football team), McAlister Field House (home of The Citadel Bulldogs basketball team), and Toronto Dominion Bank Arena at the College of Charleston, which seats 5,100 people who view the school's basketball and volleyball teams.

=== Books and films ===
Various books and films have been set in Charleston; some of the best-known works are listed below. In addition, Charleston is a popular filming location for movies and television, both in its own right and as a stand-in for Southern historical settings.

- Porgy (1925), by DuBose Heyward, adapted into the play in 1927. George Gershwin's folk opera Porgy and Bess (1935), based on the novel Porgy, is set in Charleston and was partially written at Folly Beach, near Charleston. A film version was released in 1959.
- North and South, series of books by John Jakes, was partially set in Charleston. The North and South miniseries was partially set and filmed in Charleston.
- Part of the 1989 film Glory, starring Matthew Broderick, Denzel Washington, and Morgan Freeman, features the 1863 Second Battle of Fort Wagner on Morris Island.
- The movies Swamp Thing (1982) and The Lords of Discipline (1983) (based on the novel by Pat Conroy) were partly filmed in Charleston.

== Economy ==
Commercial shipping is important to the economy. The city has two shipping terminals, of a total of five terminals owned and operated by the South Carolina Ports Authority in the Charleston metropolitan area, which are part of the fourth-largest container seaport on the East Coast and the seventh-largest container seaport in the United States. The port is also used to transfer cars and car parts for Charleston's auto manufacturing business, such as Mercedes and Volvo.

Sometimes known as Silicon Harbor, the city is becoming a popular location for high tech and innovation, and this sector has had the highest rate of growth between 2011 and 2012, due in large part to the Charleston Digital Corridor. In 2013, the Milken Institute ranked the Charleston region as the ninth-best performing economy in the US because of its growing IT sector. Notable companies include Blackbaud, Greystar Real Estate Partners, Evening Post Industries, Le Creuset, SPARC a Booz Allen Hamilton subsidiary, BoomTown, CSS, and Benefitfocus.

In June 2017, the mean sales price for a home in Charleston was $351,186 (equivalent to $453,000 in 2025) and the median price was $260,000 (equivalent to $335,300 in 2025).

=== Top employers ===
As of the city's 2023 Annual Comprehensive Financial Report, the Charleston metropolitan area's top employers are:

#	Employer	Number of employees
1	Joint Base Charleston	24,900
2	Medical University of South Carolina	17,000
3	Boeing South Carolina	6,500
4	Roper St. Francis Healthcare	6,100
5	Charleston County School District	6,000
6	Walmart	3,900
7	R.H. Johnson VA Medical Center	3,250
8	Charleston County	2,800
9	College of Charleston	2,000
10	City of Charleston	1,982

== Government ==
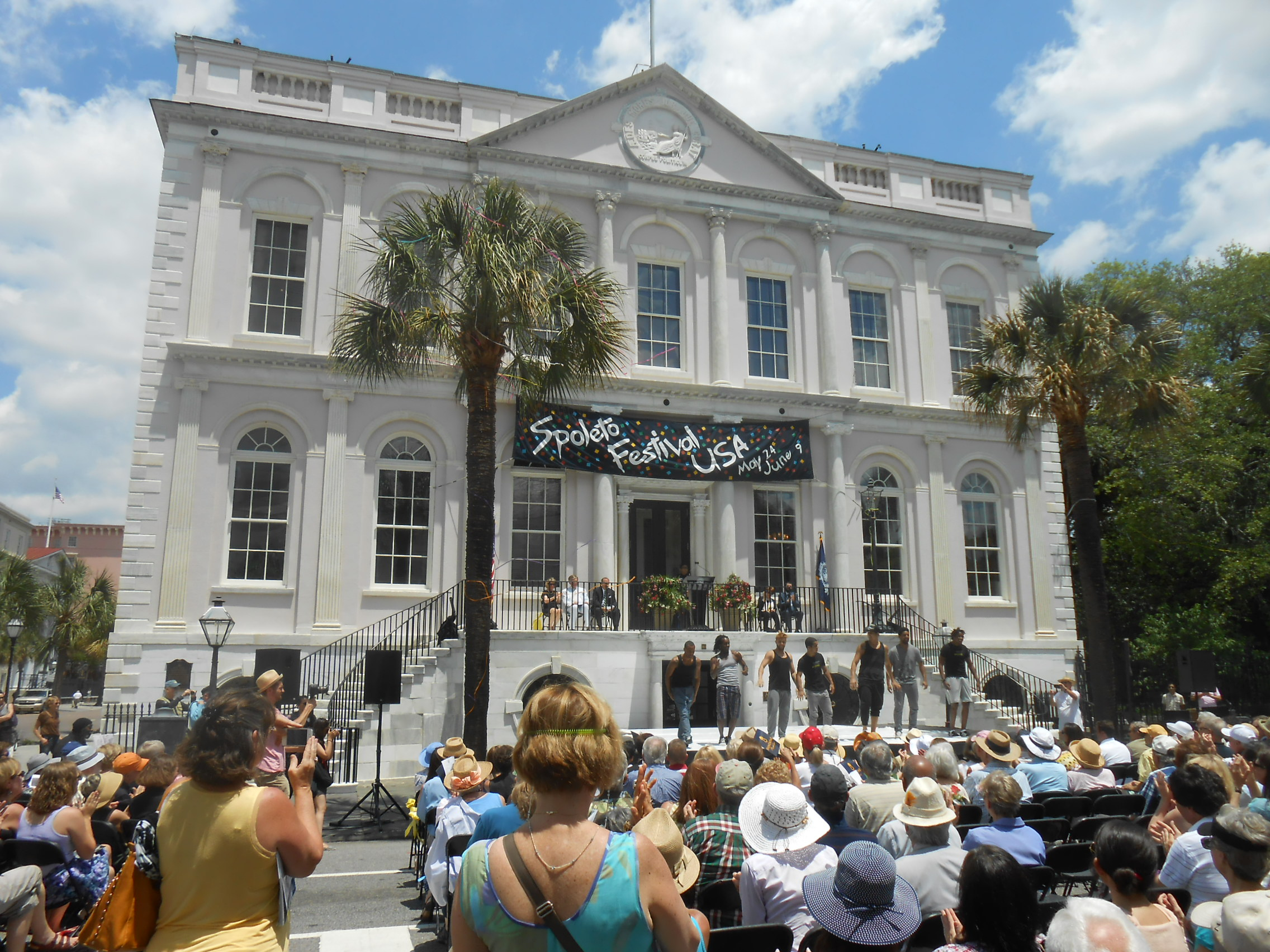
City Hall is open to visitors for free historical tours (shown here during Spoleto Festival USA)

Charleston has a strong mayor–council government, with the mayor acting as the chief administrator and the executive officer of the municipality. The mayor also presides over city council meetings and has a vote, the same as other council members. The current mayor, since 2024, is Republican William S. Cogswell Jr. The council has 12 members who are each elected from single-member districts.

=== Fire department ===
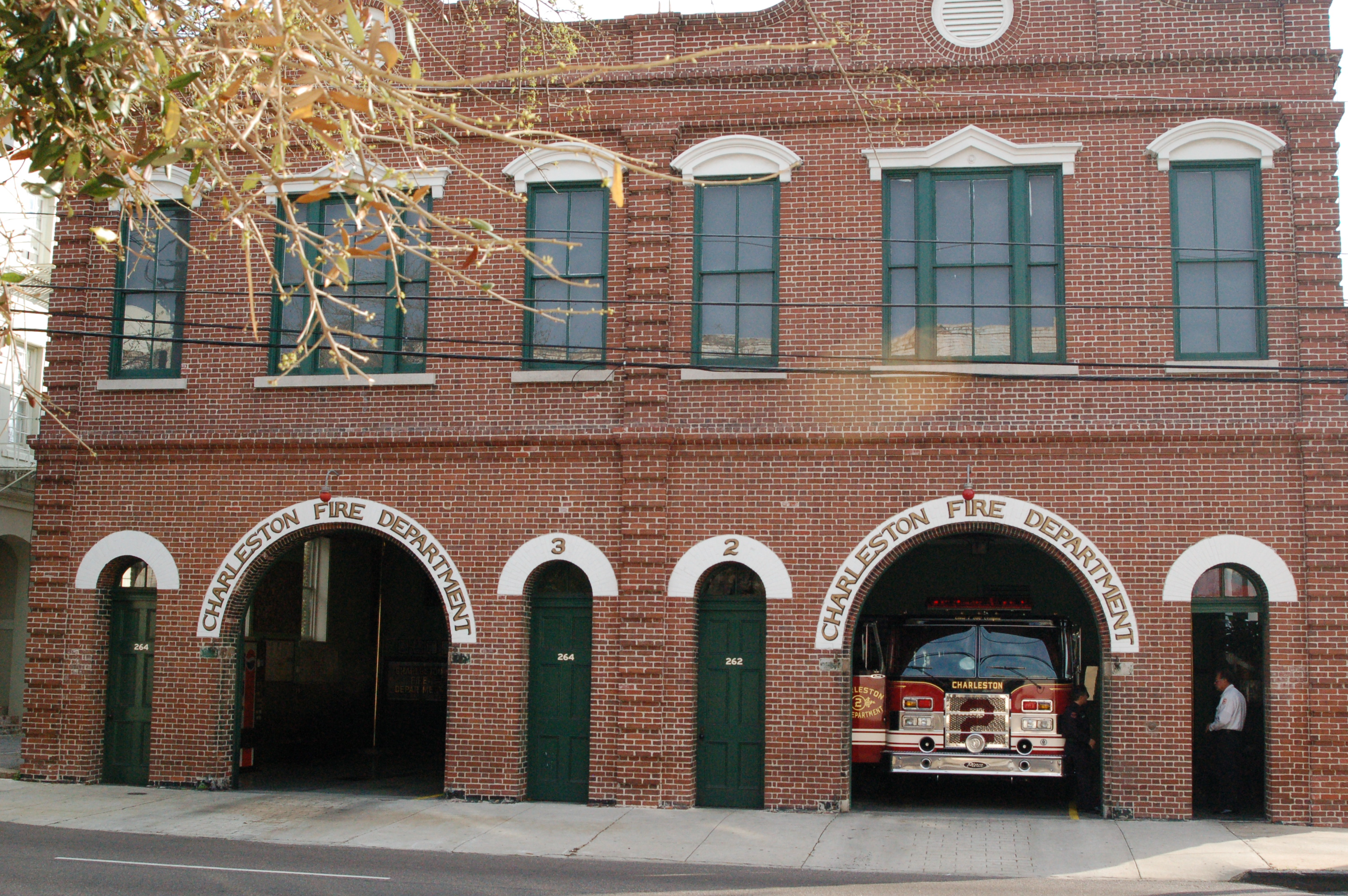
Fire Department station houses for Engines 2 and 3 of the Charleston Fire Department

The City of Charleston Fire Department consists of over 300 full-time firefighters. These firefighters operate out of 21 companies located throughout the city: 16 engine companies, two tower companies, two ladder companies, a heavy rescue company, a HAZ-MAT unit, and several special units. Training, Fire Marshall, Operations, and Administration are the department's divisions. The department operates on a 24/48 schedule and is a Class 1 ISO rating. Russell (Rusty) Thomas served as Fire Chief until June 2008, and was succeeded by Chief Thomas Carr in November 2008. Chief Daniel Curia presently leads the department.

=== Police department ===
The City of Charleston Police Department, with 456 sworn officers and 117 civilians is South Carolina's largest police department. Chico Walker serves as the current Chief of Police. He follows Luther Reynolds, Greg Mullen and Reuben Greenberg. Chief Reynolds is credited with continuing successful community outreach programs such as The Illumination Project and fostering a culture of mutual respect. Under Chief Reynolds, the agency has successfully withstood challenges such as the Coronavirus and downtown disturbances. Additionally, the agency continues to recruit police candidates in a competitive market.

=== EMS and medical centers ===
Emergency medical services (EMS) for the city are provided by Charleston County Emergency Medical Services (CCEMS) & Berkeley County Emergency Medical Services (BCEMS). The city is served by the EMS and 911 services of both Charleston and Berkeley counties since the city is part of both counties.

Charleston is the primary medical center for the eastern portion of the state. The city has several major hospitals located in the downtown area: Medical University of South Carolina Medical Center (MUSC), Ralph H. Johnson VA Medical Center, and Roper Hospital. MUSC is the state's first school of medicine, the largest medical university in the state, and the sixth-oldest continually operating school of medicine in the United States. The downtown medical district is experiencing rapid growth of biotechnology and medical research industries coupled with substantial expansions of all the major hospitals. Additionally, more expansions are planned or underway at another major hospital located in the West Ashley portion of the city: Bon Secours-St Francis Xavier Hospital. The Trident Regional Medical Center located in the City of North Charleston and East Cooper Regional Medical Center located in Mount Pleasant also serve the needs of residents of the city of Charleston.

=== Coast Guard Station Charleston ===
Coast Guard Station Charleston responds to search and rescue emergencies, conducts maritime law enforcement activities, and performs ports, waterways, and coastal security (PWCS) missions. Personnel from Station Charleston are highly trained professionals, composed of federal law enforcement officers, boat crew members, and coxswains capable of completing various missions. In 2020, the Coast Guard announced plans to construct a 2,800-acre (11 km^{2}) "superbase" on the former Charleston Naval Shipyard complex to consolidate all its Charleston-area facilities and become the homeport for five Security cutters and additional offshore cutters. Construction began on the Superbase in 2024.

==== Coast Guard Sector Charleston (District 7) ====
- Coast Guard Eurocopter HH-65 Dolphin, Johns Island
- Coast Guard Helicopter Air Facility, Johns Island, Charleston
- Coast Guard Maritime Law Enforcement Academy
- Coast Guard Reserves, Charleston
- Coast Guard Station Charleston
- USCGC Anvil, 75-foot inland construction tender, Charleston
- USCGC Calhoun (WMSL-759) National Security Cutter
- USCGC Friedman (WMSL-760) National Security Cutter (2024 Delivery)
- USCGC Hamilton (WMSL-753) National Security Cutter
- USCGC James (WMSL-754) National Security Cutter
- USCGC Stone (WMSL-758) National Security Cutter
- USCGC Willow, (WLB-202), Charleston
- USCGC Yellowfin, Marine Protector-class coastal patrol boat, Charleston

=== Military ===
- Army Corps of Engineers, Charleston District Headquarters
- Joint Base Charleston (Navy & Air Force)
- U.S. Coast Guard

== Crime ==
The following table shows Charleston's crime rate for six crimes that Morgan Quitno uses to calculate the ranking of "America's most dangerous cities" in comparison to the national average. The statistics shown are for the number of crimes committed per 100,000 people. Since 1999, the overall crime rate in Charleston has declined markedly. Charleston's total crime index rate in 1999 was 597.1 crimes committed per 100,000 people, while in 2011, the total crime index rate was 236.4 per 100,000.

Crime	Charleston (2011)	National Average
Murder	11.0	4.9
Rape	30.0	24.7
Robbery	162.0	133.4
Assault	195.0	160.5
Burglary	527.0	433.8
Theft	2,957.0	2,434.1
Auto thefts	270.0	222.3
Arson	6.0	4.9

== Transportation ==
=== Airport and rail ===
The city of Charleston is served by the Charleston International Airport. It is located in the city of North Charleston and is about 12 mi (19 km) northwest of downtown Charleston. It is the busiest passenger airport in South Carolina (IATA: CHS, ICAO: KCHS). The airport shares runways with the adjacent Charleston Air Force Base. Charleston Executive Airport is a smaller airport located in Charleston's John's Island section and is used by noncommercial aircraft. Both airports are owned and operated by the Charleston County Aviation Authority. As of April 2019, British Airways does seasonal non-stop flights from Charleston to London-Heathrow.

Charleston is served by two daily Amtrak trains: The Palmetto and Silver Meteor at the Amtrak station, located at 4565 Gaynor Avenue in the city of North Charleston, which is approximately 7.5 miles from downtown Charleston.

=== Interstates and highways ===
I-26 begins in Downtown Charleston, with exits to the Septima Clark Expressway, the Arthur Ravenel Jr. Bridge and Meeting Street. Heading northwest, it connects the city to North Charleston, the Charleston International Airport, I-95, and Columbia. The Arthur Ravenel Jr. Bridge and Septima Clark Expressway are part of US 17, which travels east–west through Charleston and Mount Pleasant. The Mark Clark Expressway, or I-526, is the bypass around the city and begins and ends at US 17. US 52 is Meeting Street and its spur is East Bay Street, which becomes Morrison Drive after leaving the east side. This highway merges with King Street in the city's Neck area (industrial district). US 78 is King Street in the downtown merging with Meeting Street.

==== Major highways ====
- I-26 (eastern terminus is in Charleston)
- I-526
- US 17
- US 52 (eastern terminus is in Charleston)
- US 78 (eastern terminus is in Charleston)
- SC 7 (Sam Rittenberg Boulevard)
- SC 30 (James Island Expressway)
- SC 61 (St. Andrews Boulevard/Ashley River Road)
- SC 171 (Old Towne Road/Folly Road)
- SC 461 (Paul Cantrell Boulevard/Glenn McConnell Parkway)
- SC 700 (Maybank Highway)

==== Arthur Ravenel Jr. Bridge ====
The Arthur Ravenel Jr. Bridge across the Cooper River opened on July 16, 2005, and was the longest cable-stayed bridge in the Americas at the time of its construction. The bridge links downtown Charleston with Mount Pleasant, and has eight lanes plus a 12-foot lane shared by pedestrians and bicycles. The bridge's height varies but is estimated at 573 feet. It replaced the Grace Memorial Bridge (built in 1929) and the Silas N. Pearman Bridge (built in 1966). They were considered two of the more dangerous bridges in America and were demolished after the Ravenel Bridge opened.

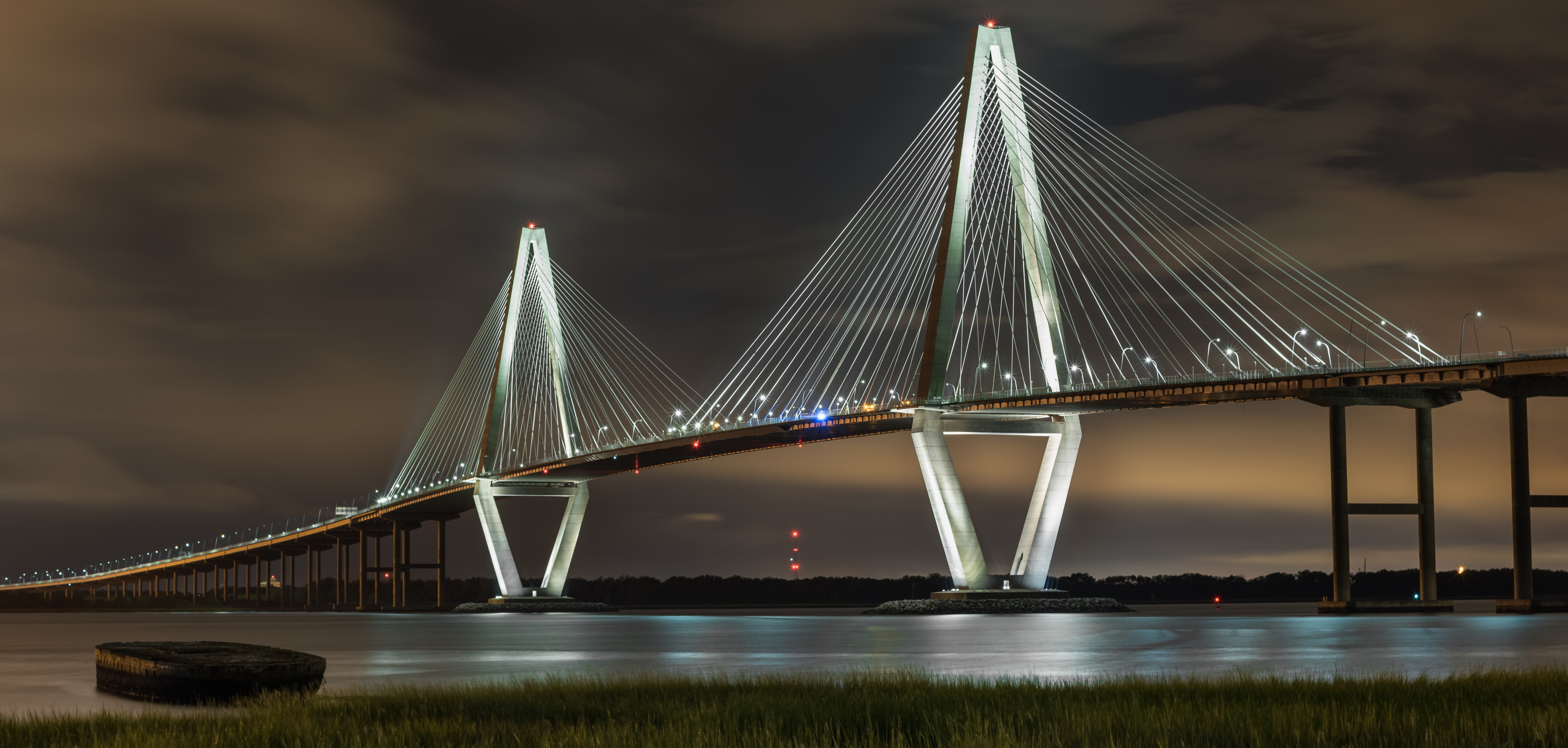
The new Arthur Ravenel Jr. Bridge, constructed in 2005 and named after the late U.S. Representative Arthur Ravenel Jr., who pushed the project to fruition, was at the time of its construction the longest cable-stayed bridge in the Western Hemisphere.

=== City bus service ===
The city is also served by a bus system operated by the Charleston Area Regional Transportation Authority (CARTA). Most of the urban area is served by regional fixed-route buses equipped with bike racks as part of the system's Rack and Ride program. CARTA offers connectivity to historic downtown attractions and accommodations with the Downtown Area Shuttle trolley buses, and it offers curbside pickup for disabled passengers with its Tel-A-Ride buses. A bus rapid transit system is in development, called Lowcountry Rapid Transit, that will connect Charleston to Ladson through North Charleston.

Rural parts of the city and metropolitan area are served by a different bus system operated by the Berkeley-Charleston-Dorchester Rural Transportation Management Association. The system is also commonly called the TriCounty Link.

=== Port ===
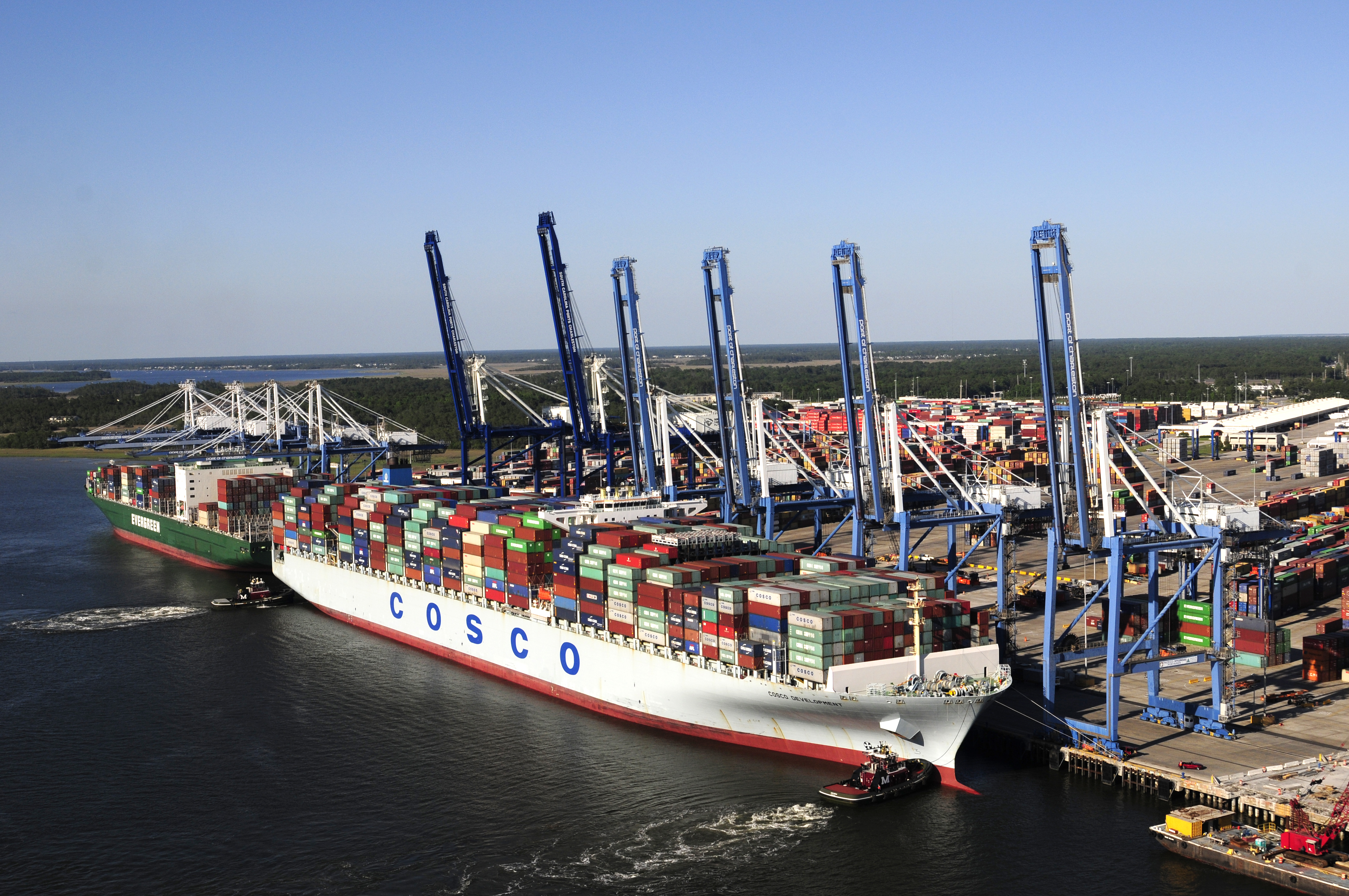
Wanda Welch Terminal in the Port of Charleston

The Port of Charleston, owned and operated by the South Carolina Ports Authority, is one of the largest ports in the United States, ranked seventh in the top 25 by containerized cargo volume in 2018. It consists of six terminals, with the sixth opening in April 2021. Port activity at the two terminals located in the city of Charleston is one of the city's leading sources of revenue, behind tourism.

Today, the Port of Charleston boasts the deepest water in the southeast region and regularly handles ships too big to transit through the Panama Canal. A harbor-deepening project was completed, which makes the Port of Charleston's entrance channel a depth of 54 feet (16 m) and harbor channel 52 feet at mean low tide. With an average high tide of 6 feet (1.8 m), the depth clearances will become 60 feet (18 m) and 58 feet, respectively. At 52 feet (16 m), the Port of Charleston is the deepest harbor on the East Coast.

Part of Union Pier Terminal in Charleston is a cruise ship passenger terminal hosting numerous cruise departures annually through 2019. Beginning in May 2019, until cruise operations were interrupted in April 2020, the Carnival Sunshine was permanently stationed in Charleston, offering 4, 5, and 7-day cruises to the Caribbean.

With the closure of the Naval Base and the Charleston Naval Shipyard in 1996, Detyens, Inc. signed a long-term lease. Detyens Shipyard, Inc. is one of the East Coast's most extensive commercial marine repair facilities, with three dry docks, one floating dock, and six piers. Projects include military, commercial, and cruise ships.

== Education ==
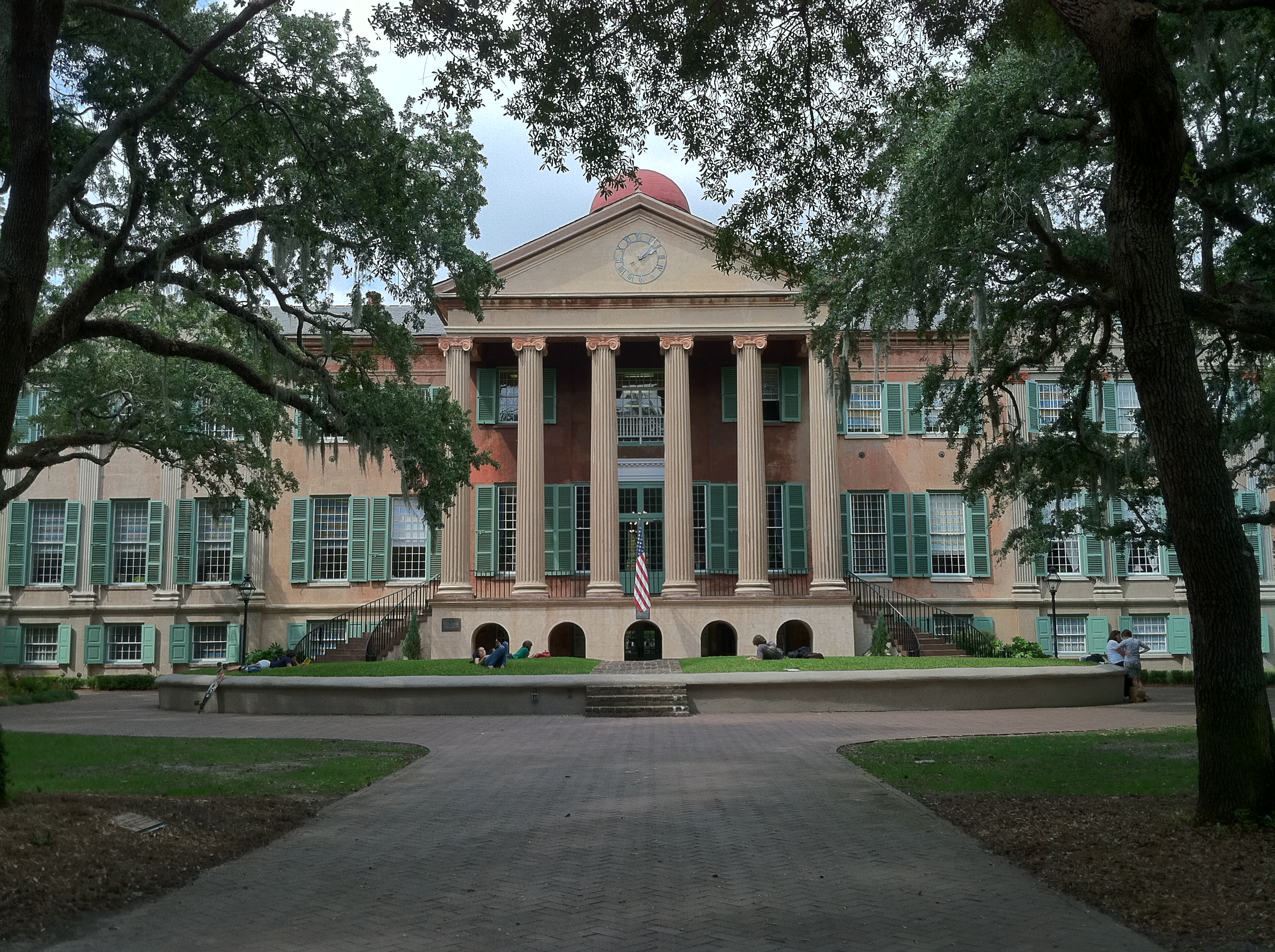
Randolph Hall, College of Charleston

Because most of the city of Charleston is located in Charleston County, it is served by the Charleston County School District, which covers all of Charleston County. Part of the city, however, is served by the Berkeley County School District, which covers all of Berkeley County. This Berkeley County section includes northern portions of the city, such as the Cainhoy Industrial District, Cainhoy Historical District, and Daniel Island.

Charleston is also served by a large number of independent schools, including Porter-Gaud School (K-12), Charleston Collegiate School (K-12), Ashley Hall (Pre K-12), Charleston Day School (K-8), First Baptist Church School (K-12), Palmetto Christian Academy (K-12), Coastal Christian Preparatory School (K-12), Mason Preparatory School (K-8), and Addlestone Hebrew Academy (K-8).

The Roman Catholic Diocese of Charleston Office of Education also operates out of the city and oversees several K-8 parochial schools, such as Blessed Sacrament School, Christ Our King School, Charleston Catholic School, Nativity School, and Divine Redeemer School, all of which are "feeder" schools into Bishop England High School, a diocesan high school within the city. Bishop England, Porter-Gaud School, and Ashley Hall are the city's oldest and most prominent private schools and are a significant part of Charleston's history, dating back some 150 years.

Public institutions of higher education in Charleston include the College of Charleston, The Citadel, The Military College of South Carolina, and the Medical University of South Carolina. The city is also home to private schools, including the Charleston Southern University and Charleston School of Law. Charleston is also home to the Roper Hospital School of Practical Nursing, and the city has a downtown satellite campus for the region's technical school, Trident Technical College. Charleston has the only college in the country that offers bachelor's degrees in the building arts, The American College of the Building Arts.

== Media ==
=== Broadcast television ===
Charleston is the nation's 89th-largest Designated market area (DMA), with 332,770 households and 0.27% of the U.S. TV population. These stations are licensed in Charleston and have significant operations or viewers in the city:

- WCBD-TV (2, NBC, CW+)
- WGWG (4, MeTV)
- WCSC-TV (5, CBS, Bounce TV, Grit)
- WITV (7, PBS)
- WLCN-CD (18, CTN)
- WTAT-TV (24, Fox)
- WAZS-CD (29, Azteca America Independent)
- WJNI-CD (31, America One Independent)
- WCIV (36, MyNetworkTV, ABC)

== Sister cities ==
Charleston's sister cities are:

- Doha, Qatar
- Freetown, Sierra Leone
- Panama City, Panama
- Speightstown, Barbados
- Spoleto, Italy

The relationship with Spoleto began when Pulitzer Prize-winning Italian composer Gian Carlo Menotti selected Charleston as the city to host the American version of Spoleto's annual Festival of Two Worlds. "Looking for a city that would provide the charm of Spoleto, as well as its wealth of theaters, churches, and other performance spaces, they selected Charleston, South Carolina, as the ideal location. The historic city provided a perfect fit: intimate enough that the Festival would captivate the entire city, yet cosmopolitan enough to provide an enthusiastic audience and robust infrastructure."

Sister city relation with Panama City was described as follows:

As you may be aware, the city of Charleston, like the city of Panama City, is a historic port City that shares a proud and prosperous history. Our stories are very similar as reflected by our citizens of European, African, Caribbean, native descent, our cuisine, our architecture, and our mutual modern growth in meritime commerce. As Panama City is enjoying a global surge of interest so is Charleston, being ranked as a top destination for travellers, commerce, technology, education, culture and fashion.

— The Honorable Joseph P. Riley Jr., Mayor, City of Charleston 1974–2016

Charleston is also twinned with Speightstown. The first colonists to settle in the region designed the original parts of Charlestown based on the plans of Barbados's capital city, Bridgetown. Many indigo, tobacco, and cotton planters relocated their plantation operations and the people they enslaved from Speightstown to Charleston after the sugarcane industry came to dominate agricultural production in Barbados.

== See also ==
- Anson Street African Burial Ground
- List of municipalities in South Carolina
- USS Charleston, 6 ships

== Works cited ==
- Dallas, William Leist Eneas Sweetland (1878), "Charleston" , in Baynes, T. S. (ed.), Encyclopædia Britannica, vol. 5 (9th ed.), New York: Charles Scribner's Sons, pp. 428–429
- Chisholm, Hugh, ed. (1911), "Charleston (South Carolina)" , Encyclopædia Britannica, vol. 5 (11th ed.), Cambridge University Press, pp. 943–945
- Edgar, Walter B. (1998), South Carolina: A History, Columbia: University of South Carolina Press, ISBN 9781570032554
- Frazier, Herb; Bernard Edward Powers Jr.; Wentworth, Marjory (2016), We Are Charleston: Tragedy and Triumph at Mother Emanuel, Nashville: W Publishing, ISBN 9780718041496.
- McInnis, Maurie D. (2005), The Politics of Taste in Antebellum Charleston, Chapel Hill: University of North Carolina Press, ISBN 9781469625997
- Thompson, Michael D. (2015), Working on the Dock of the Bay: Labor and Enterprise in an Antebellum Southern Port, Columbia: University of South Carolina Press, ISBN 9781611174755
