= TD Arena =

Multi-purpose arena in South Carolina

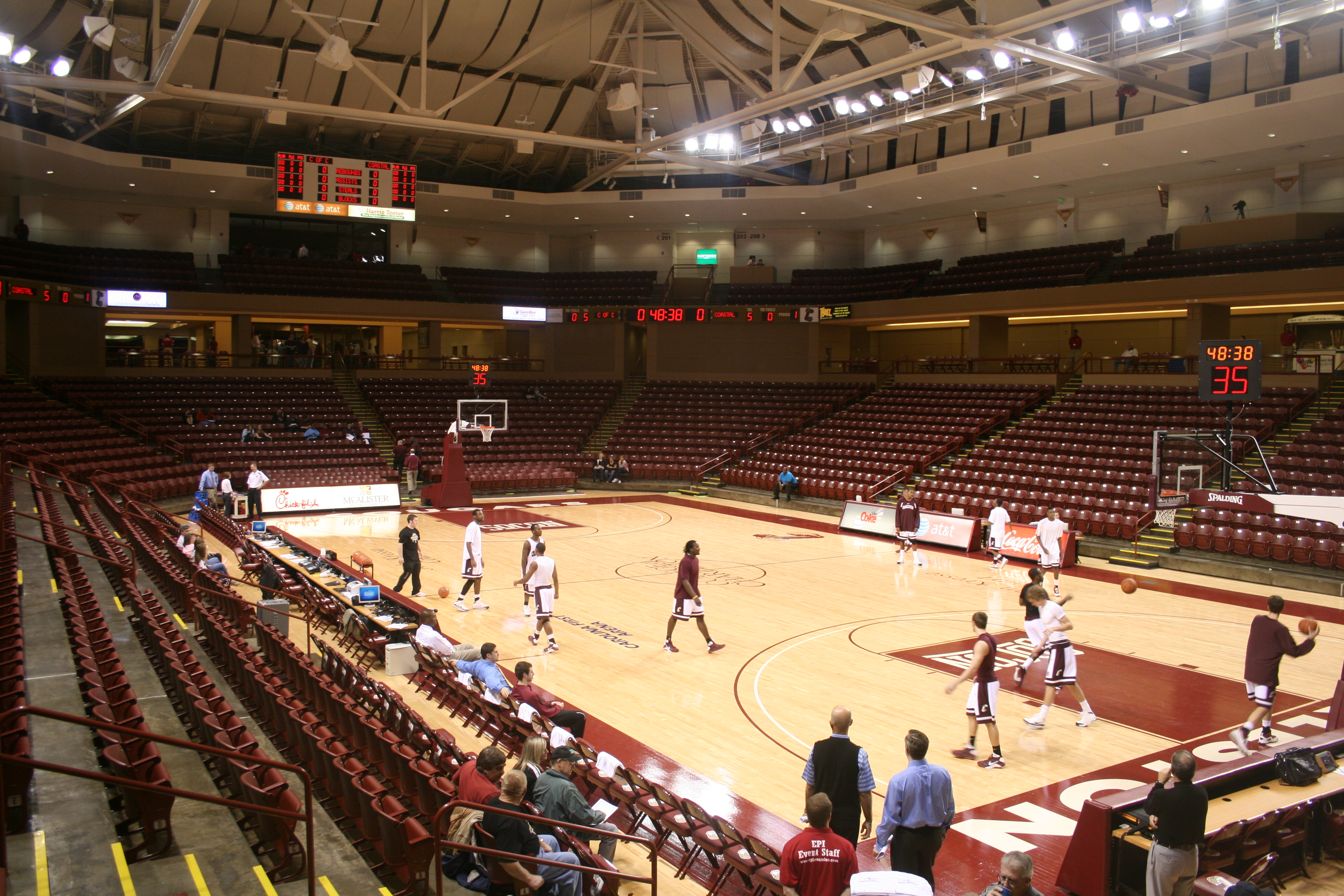
- Interactive map of TD Arena
- Former names: Carolina First Center (pre–2008); Carolina First Arena (2008–2011)
- Location: 301 Meeting Street; Charleston, SC 29401
- Coordinates: 32°47′8″N 79°56′4″W
- Owner: College of Charleston
- Operator: College of Charleston
- Capacity: 5,100
- Surface: Hardwood

Construction
- Groundbreaking: December 6, 2006
- Opened: November 14, 2008
- Cost: $47 million ($70.3 million in 2025 dollars)
- Architect: Betsch Associates Inc.
- Project manager: Cumming Corp.
- Structural engineer: Geiger Engineers
- Services engineers: Smith Seckman Reid, Inc.
- General contractor: Turner/Thompson

Tenants
- Charleston Cougars (NCAA) (2008–present); Men's basketball Women's basketball Women's volleyball ESPN Charleston Classic (2008–present)

TD Arena is multi-purpose indoor sporting and performance arena located in Charleston, South Carolina, United States. Owned and operated by the College of Charleston, the venue serves as the primary home court for the Charleston Cougars men's and women's basketball teams and the school's women's volleyball team. The arena, which officially opened in November 2008, was designed to replace the F. Mitchell Johnson Physical Education Center and its internal John Kresse Arena.

The venue originally opened as Carolina First Arena, but was formally renamed TD Arena in the fall of 2011 following TD Bank's 2010 acquisition of Carolina First Bank.

With a seating capacity of 5,100 for basketball contests, the arena has multiple amenities, including hospitality suites, a dedicated team store, and comprehensive athletic training facilities. Beyond collegiate athletics, TD Arena functions as a civic hub, hosting the annual ESPN-owned Charleston Classic basketball tournament, university convocations, community memorials, and large-scale artistic performances associated with the Spoleto Festival USA. The playing surface is designated as John Kresse Court in honour of the legendary Charleston men's basketball coach John Kresse.

The TD Arena is overseen by Richard Bouknight, Associate Director of Athletics for External Operations and by Kip Vogel, Director of Event Operations & Facilities.

== History ==
=== Construction & Naming History ===
The College of Charleston used a design-bid-build delivery method to construct the arena, which was planned to replace the adjacent John Kresse Arena. The facility was designed by Betsch Associates Inc., with structural engineering provided by Geiger Engineers and general contracting managed by Thompson Turner Construction.

Built on a tightly constrained urban footprint within the Charleston historic district, construction crews were limited to accessing the site through a 30-foot opening in an existing Meeting Street fence, requiring careful mitigation of noise and vibration to accommodate surrounding occupied structures. Due to its coastal geographic location, the building's structural framework was engineered to withstand high seismic and hurricane wind loads. The total construction cost was approximately $45 million.

Originally to be named Carolina First Center, the facility opened in 2008 as Carolina First Arena to avoid confusion with the bank's south coast main offices in Charleston, which are located in an office building by the same name. After the bank was acquired by Toronto-Dominion Bank in 2010, the licensing agreement was updated, and the facility was formally renamed TD Arena in the fall of 2011.

== Features ==
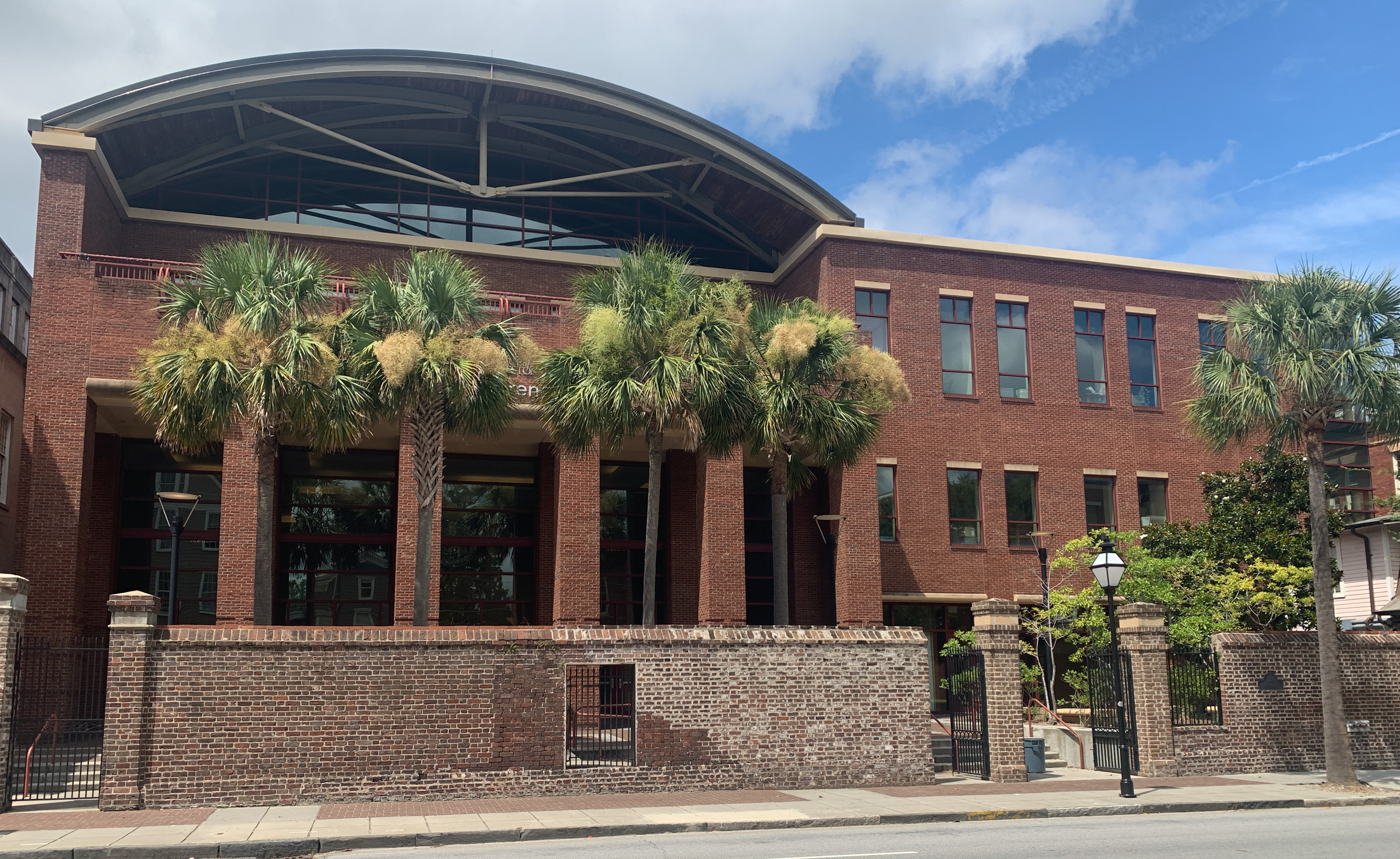
The arena seen from Meeting Street in 2020

The arena covers 190,500 square feet of combined new and renovated construction. The interior features a two-level seating bowl with an open concourse design, maintaining continuous sightlines to the court from the concession areas. Seating throughout the bowl consists of individual seat-back chairs. The venue is equipped with four corner fascia scoreboards that display game statistics, alongside a 16mm video board located on the west end.

In addition to the main arena bowl, the building houses strength and conditioning spaces, a sports medicine facility, academic support offices, and practice areas.

== Events ==
Beyond collegiate athletics, the facility operates as a civic and cultural venue for the Charleston region.

Civic and Political Events

On June 26, 2015, TD Arena hosted the funeral service for South Carolina state senator and pastor Rev. Clementa Pinckney, who was killed in the Emanuel African Methodist Episcopal Church shooting. President Barack Obama delivered the eulogy to a capacity crowd of approximately 6,000 mourners, concluding his address by singing the hymn "Amazing Grace".

Athletic Tournaments

In July 2008, the College of Charleston announced that the Charleston Classic would be played Nov. 14–16 at the new Carolina First Center and described the tournament as the first event to be held in the facility. The opening game of the tournament featured Western Michigan University vs. Texas Christian University; TCU won 67–63.

On January 4, 2010, the College of Charleston defeated then No. 9 ranked and defending national champion North Carolina 82–79 in overtime at Carolina First Arena.

The arena is the host site for the Shriners Children's Charleston Classic, an annual eight-team early-season men's college basketball tournament owned and operated by ESPN Events. Additionally, the venue hosts "Battle on the Bricks," a USA Boxing-sanctioned amateur charity event that raises funds for the MUSC Children's Hospital and the College of Charleston Athletic Fund.

Arts & Culture

During the annual Spoleto Festival USA, TD Arena functions both as an active performance venue and as the designated indoor contingency site for outdoor events scheduled at the Cistern Yard. The arena has hosted large-scale musical acts for the festival, including performances by René Marie, Béla Fleck, and Arturo O'Farrill's Afro Latin Jazz Orchestra.

== Renovations ==
During the summer of 2024, the arena underwent a back-of-house modernization project designed by Stephens Direct. The upgrades included the installation of 10,000 square feet of wall graphics featuring local Charleston landmarks, 6,000 square feet of commercial luxury vinyl flooring, and upgraded Westlake LED hallway lighting to enhance the facilities utilized by student-athletes.

== See also ==
- List of NCAA Division I basketball arenas
- TD Garden (Boston, Massachusetts)
- TD Bank Ballpark (Bridgewater, New Jersey)
- TD Ameritrade Park Omaha (Nebraska)
- TD Bank Sports Center (Hamden, Connecticut)
