= John Zeigler =

American poet

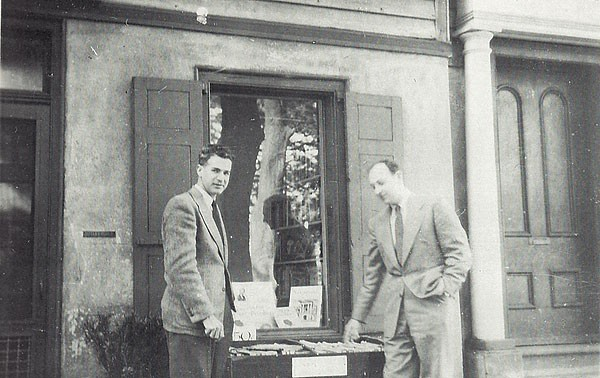
Edwin D. Peacock and John Zeigler Jr.

John Asbury Zeigler Jr. (February 5, 1912 – October 2, 2015) was the owner of the Book Basement in Charleston with his longtime partner Edwin D. Peacock.

== Biography ==
John Asbury Zeigler Jr. was born on February 5, 1912. Originally from Manning, South Carolina, he attended high school in Florence, South Carolina. He attended the Citadel where he founded the literary magazine The Shako and participated in the playwright competition of the Dock Street Theatre.

In 1940, he met his longtime partner Edwin Peacock on the Isle of Palms. During World War II, Zeigler served as a radioman. His time in the Navy inspired him to write poems about his experiences at sea and his time living in Yakutat Bay, Alaska. In one such experience, he was on a ship carrying the American flag erected at the end of the battle of Iwo Jima, even steering the ship at one time during the battle when there were too many unused radiomen.

Back home from the war, in 1946 Zeigler and Peacock opened the Book Basement in Charleston on the ground floor of 9 College Way, Zeigler's family home. The Book Basement became a leading independent bookstore, the meeting place for various civil rights groups. Gay men passing through Charleston knew to visit the bookshop, including Maurice Sendak and Langston Hughes, who became friends of the owners. A drawing of the building by Prentiss Taylor was used on advertising events for the store for many years. Harlan Greene, a friend of Zeigler since the 1970s, said the bookstore was an "oasis...open to all". They closed the bookstore in 1971 and the College of Charleston bought the building. Today a plaque in front of the building remembers Peacock and Zeigler.

Zeigler and Peacock were serving members of the Charleston chapter of the NAACP.

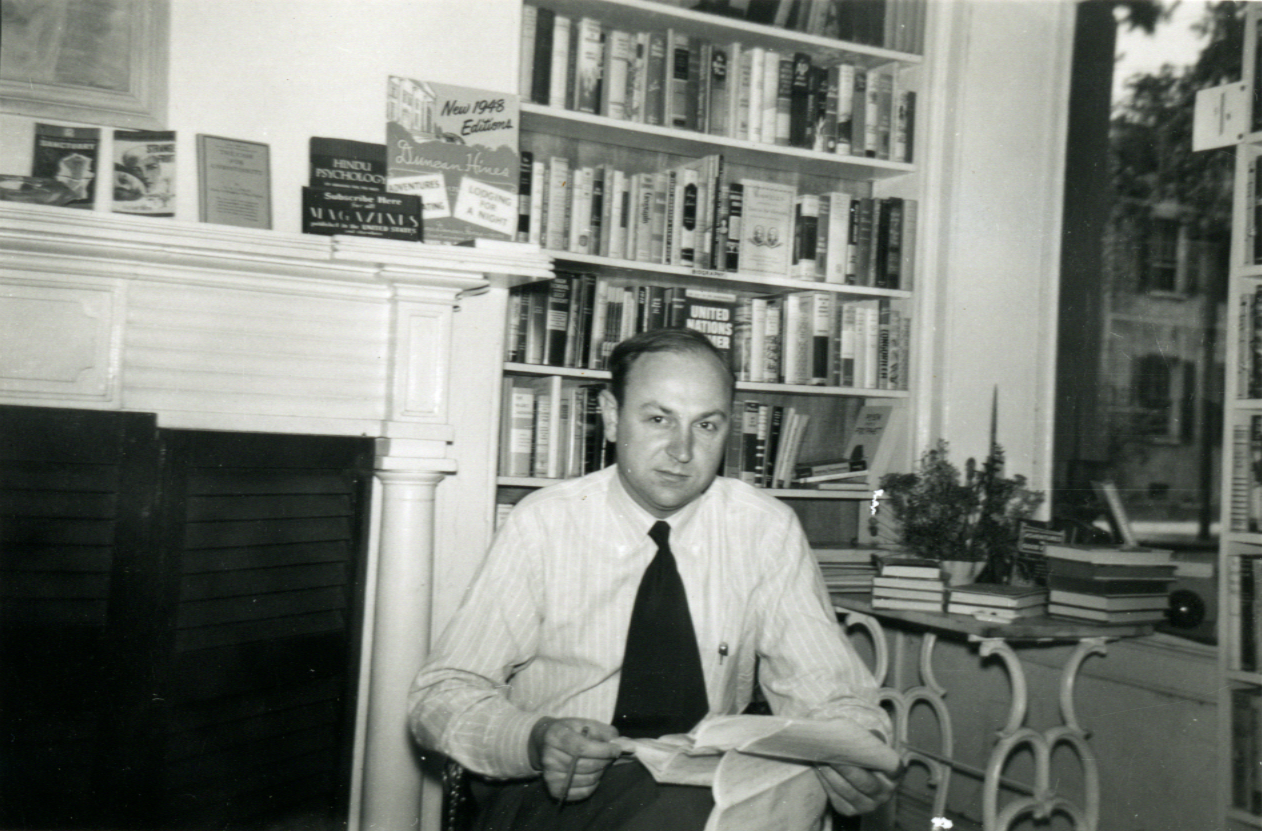
John Zeigler in the Book Basement, June 1948

Zeigler was a member of the Poetry Society of South Carolina and published a cycle of memorial poems on their relationship, titled The Edwin Poems.

Zeigler appeared with a nickname in Jeb and Dash: A Diary of Gay Life 1918-1945, the diaries recounting the life of C.C. Dasham and Jeb Alexander.

Peacock died in 1989, and Zeigler became a philanthropist, endowing 15 music scholarships at the College of Charleston, supporting the Charleston Symphony Orchestra, Spoleto Festival USA and other groups.

In 2009 James T. Sears wrote Edwin and John: A Personal History of the American South, published by Routledge.

In 2013, Zeigler received the Elizabeth O'Neill Verner Award.

Zeigler died on October 2, 2015, at 103 years old.
