= City Market (Charleston, South Carolina) =

Building in South Carolina, US

- Market Hall and Sheds
- U.S. National Register of Historic Places
- U.S. National Historic Landmark
- U.S. National Historic Landmark District – Contributing property
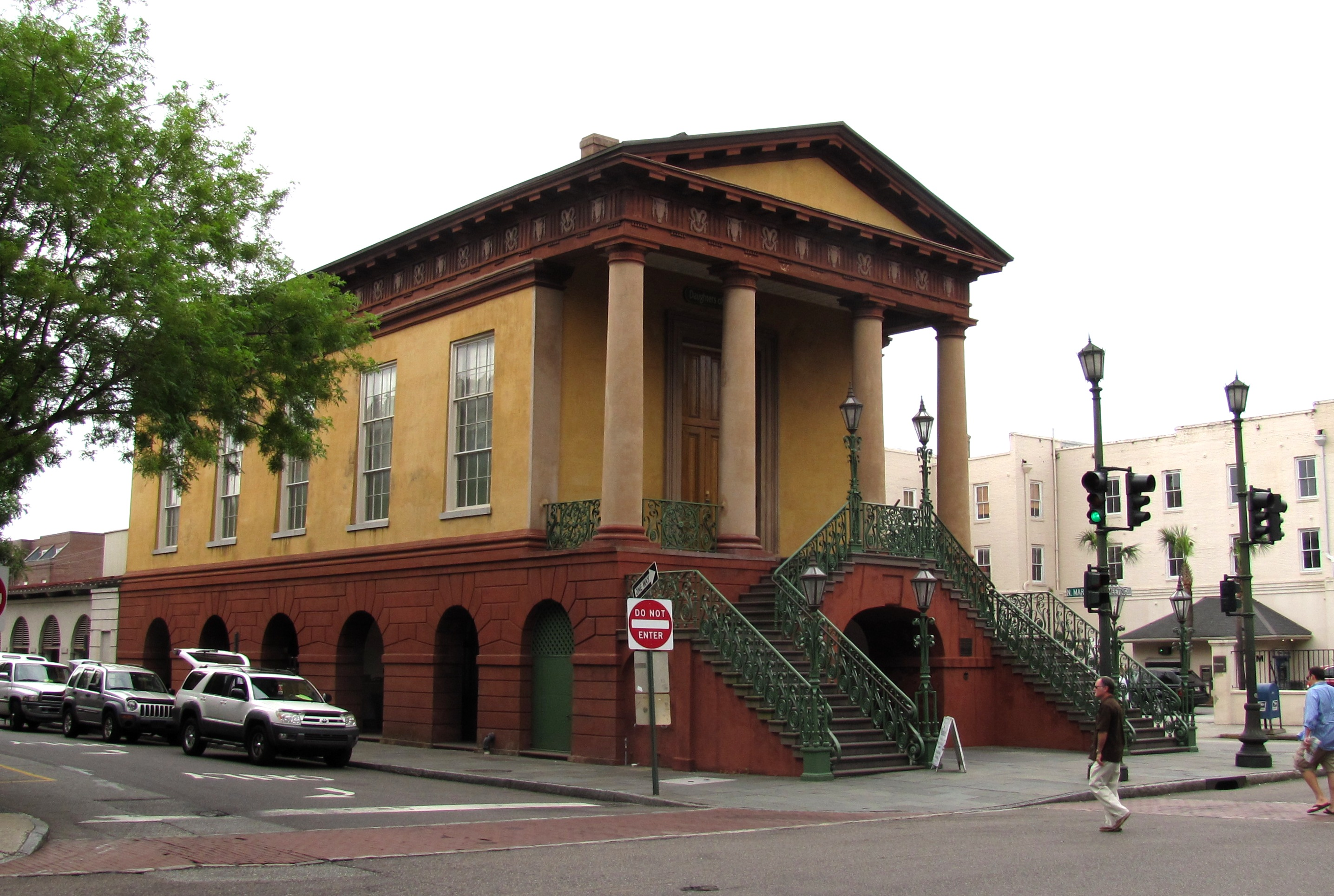
- Market Hall

- Location within South Carolina Location within the United States
- Location: 188 Meeting St., Charleston, South Carolina
- Coordinates: 32°46′49″N 79°55′53″W
- Area: .33 acres (1,300 m^{2})
- Built: 1841
- Architect: Edward Brickell White
- Architectural style: Greek Revival
- Part of: Charleston Historic District (ID66000964)
- NRHP reference No.: 73001689

Significant dates
- Added to NRHP: June 4, 1973
- Designated NHL: November 7, 1973
- Designated NHLDCP: October 9, 1960

City Market is a historic market complex in downtown Charleston, South Carolina. Established in the 1790s, the market stretches for four city blocks from the architecturally significant Market Hall, which faces Meeting Street, through a continuous series of one-story market sheds, the last of which terminates at East Bay Street. The market should not be confused with the Old Slave Mart (now a museum), where enslaved people were sold, as enslaved people were never sold in the City Market (this is a common misconception). The City Market Hall has been described as a building of the "highest architectural design quality." The entire complex was listed on the National Register of Historic Places as Market Hall and Sheds and was further designated a National Historic Landmark.

Initially known as the Centre Market, Charleston's City Market was developed to replace the city's Beef Market building (on the site of Charleston City Hall), which burned in 1796. Market Hall, designed by Charleston architect Edward B. White, was added in the early 1840s. Throughout the 19th century, the market provided a convenient place for area farms and plantations to sell beef and produce; it also acted as a place for locals to gather and socialize. Today, the City Market's vendors sell souvenirs and other items ranging from jewelry to Gullah sweetgrass baskets. Since 1899, the City Market has housed Charleston's Confederate Museum.

== Design ==
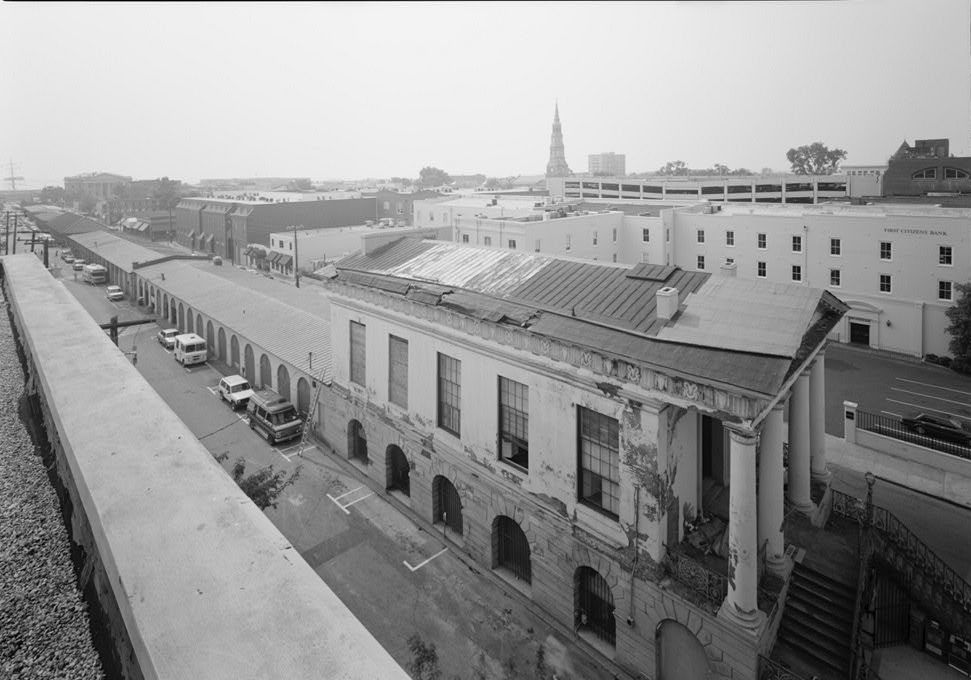
Market Hall (prior to restoration), with sheds stretching into the distance

Market Hall is a Greek Revival-style building consisting of one raised story resting atop a rusticated open ground-level arcade. The building's high base and frontal portico were inspired by Greek and Roman temples such as the Temple of Portunus and Temple of Athena Nike. The portico contains four Roman style Doric columns that support the entablature and pediment, and is accessed by a double flight of stairs with elaborate iron work. The upper floor is scored in an ashlar pattern. The cornice, portico, and Doric capitals are red sandstone, while the triglyphs and moldings are cement. The metopes in the entablature are decorated with alternating bucrania and rams' heads, which are symbols for a meat market. The hall's exterior brick walls are covered with brownstone stucco.

The City Market stretches for 1,240 feet (380 m) through a continuous series of sheds oriented east–west and flanked by North Market Street on the north side and South Market Street on the south. Market stalls occupy the first story of Market Hall and continue through a one-story shed that stretches from the rear of the hall to Church Street. The second shed stretches from Church to Anson Street, the third from Anson to State Street, and the fourth from State Street to East Bay. The sheds are simple rectangular structures with open stalls and center walkways. Since their completion in the early 19th century, the sheds have been renovated and rebuilt numerous times due to damage from earthquakes, fire, and other disasters.

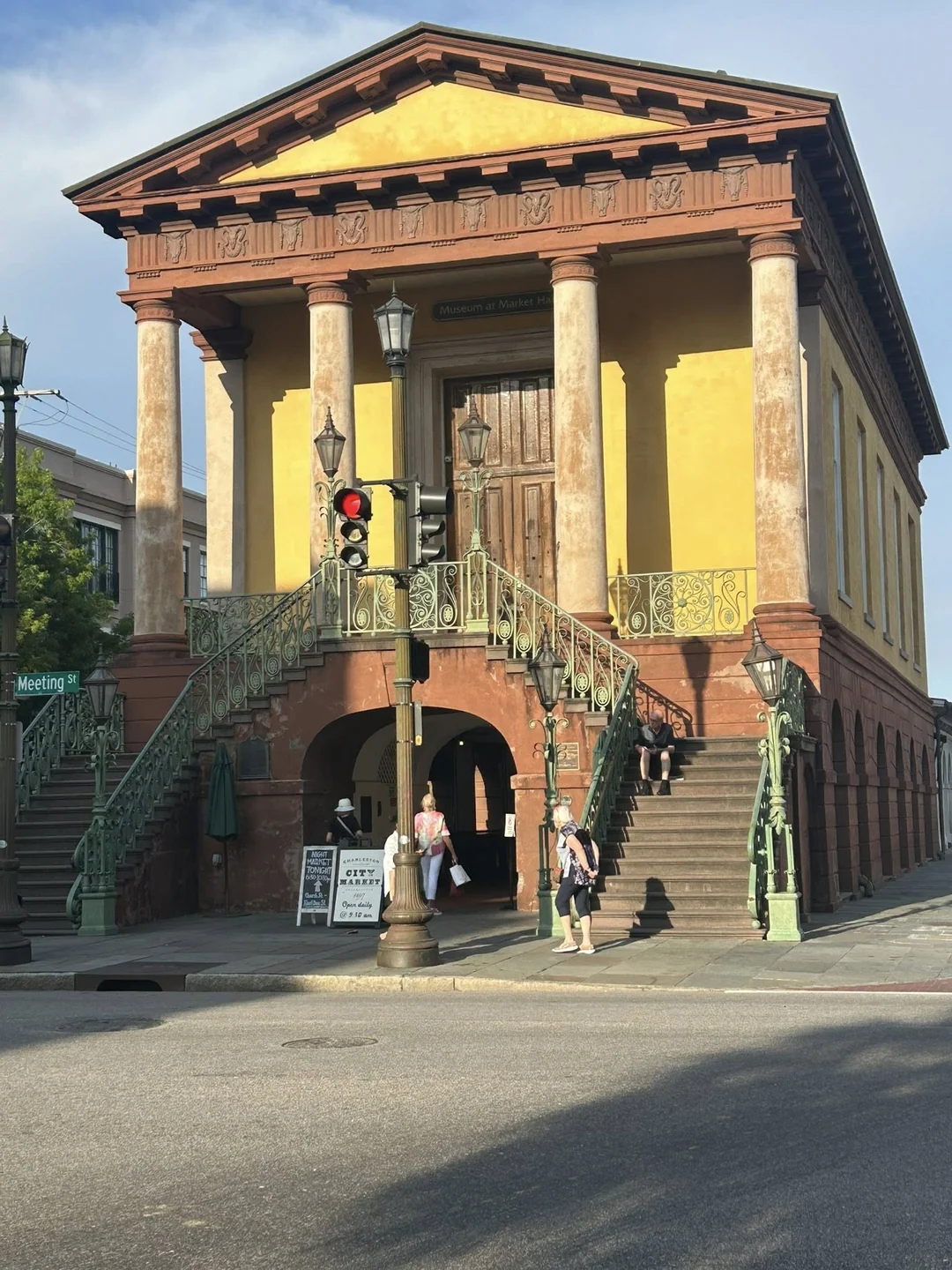

== History ==
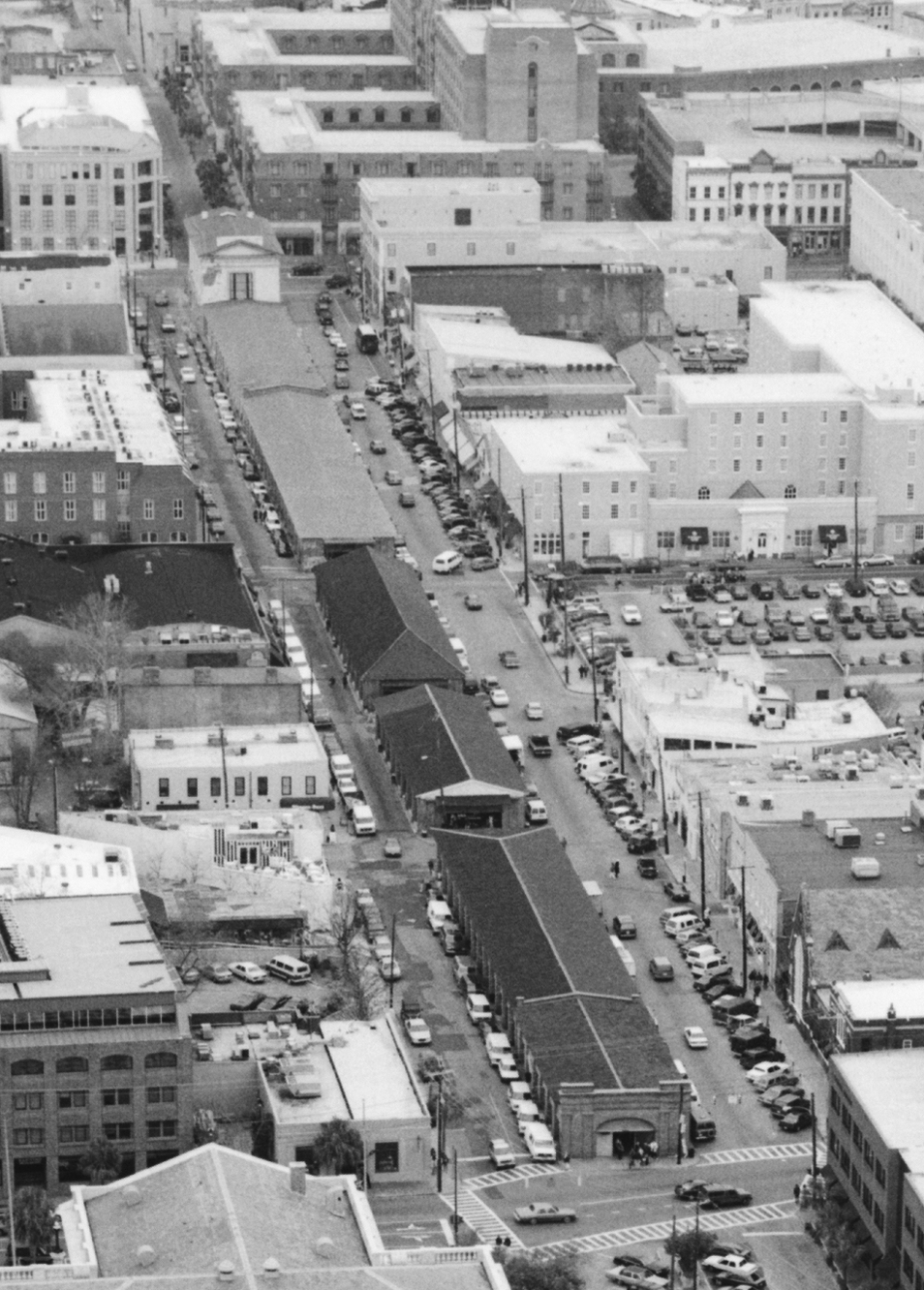
Aerial view of the market

Charleston's first public market was established in 1692 at the corner of Broad and Meeting streets, although a formal brick building wasn't built at the site until 1739. This first "Beef Market" was replaced by a more appealing structure in 1760, and within a short period, new markets for fish and general merchandise were established along Vendue (Queen) and Tradd streets. In 1788, Revolutionary War general Charles Cotesworth Pinckney and other landowners along an existing canal donated a strip of recovered marshland for the establishment of the "Centre Market," which would stretch from the docks of Charleston Harbor to Meeting Street. The donation was subject to three conditions: (1) the City had to use the property to create Market Street and market buildings for that purpose in perpetuity, (2) the City had two years to build the market buildings, and (3) the remaining land of the donors that then would front on Market Street could not be especially taxed for the construction costs. The donor expressly reserved the right to reclaim the land if the property is not used for a market.

The first market sheds were erected around 1790 and gradually expanded to occupy most of the strip from the harbor to Meeting Street by 1806. After the Beef Market building burned in 1796, Charleston's beef market was shifted to the Centre Market. In its early days, the market was primarily a place to sell foodstuffs, and was subdivided into sections for beef, fish, and farm produce. The market was also a social center where lower and middle-class residents could gather to drink and play games. Vultures, which kept the market clean by eating discarded meat scraps, were a common sight at the market into the 20th century and were protected by law.

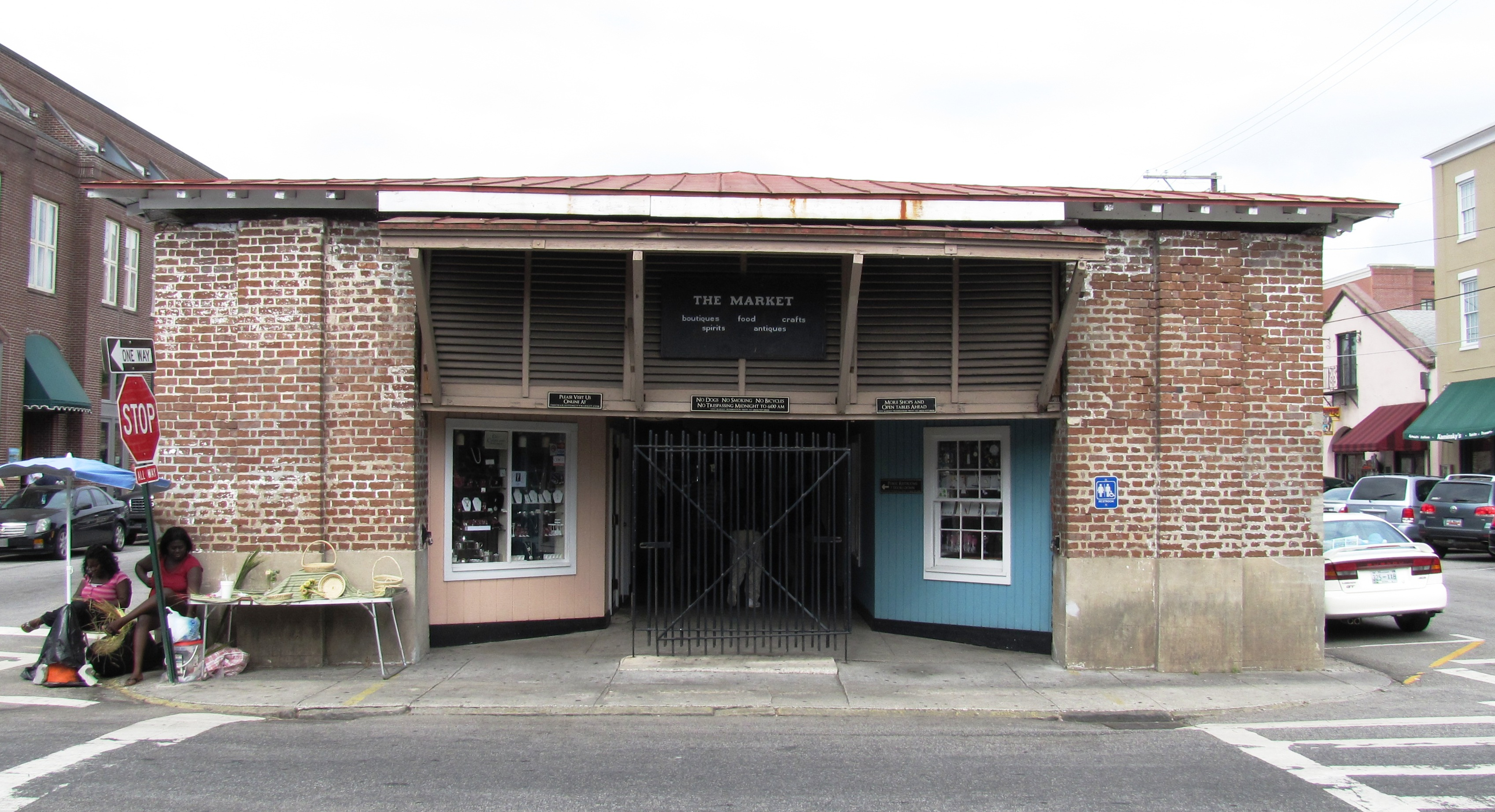
Church Street entrance to the market, with Gullah sweetgrass basket vendors on the left

In 1838, a fire destroyed the market's headhouse, and the city enlisted local architect Edward B. White (1806–1882) to design the current headhouse, Market Hall, which was completed in 1841. The upper room of the hall initially served as a large assembly room and later as a military recruiting office at the outbreak of the Civil War.

While Charleston's City Hall was undergoing significant repairs in 1881–1882, the mayor worked out of Market Hall.

In 1899, the United Daughters of the Confederacy Chapter 4 began using Market Hall to house a Confederate Museum that displayed artifacts and other items from the city's Confederate period. The museum closed in 1989 after Market Hall suffered substantial damage during Hurricane Hugo (including the partial removal of its roof), and was later reopened after having been temporarily housed in a Charleston kindergarten.

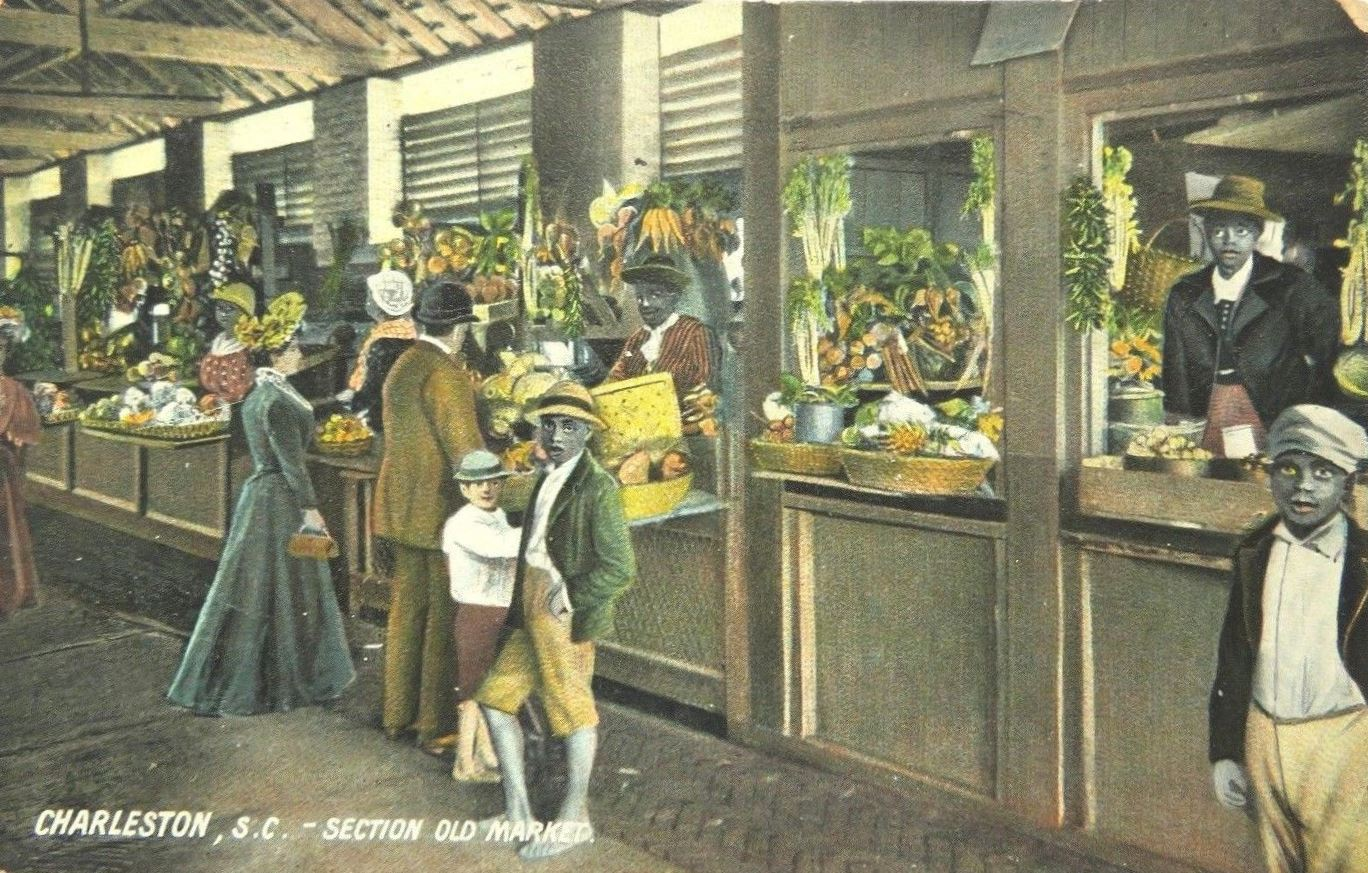
The Market's open-air stalls were shown in this postcard that was mailed in 1910.

By the early days of the twentieth century, the number of food merchants using the Market had dropped dramatically. In January 1901, the Charleston City Council took up the matter, and a report was endorsed to replace the market sheds between East Bay (to the east) and Anson Street (to the west) with a small park to reinvigorate the area. While proponents of this action argued it would save taxpayer money on upkeep of the aging structures, a special committee of City Council reversed course following criticism from historical preservationists. The same matter cropped up again at a City Council meeting on November 8, 1904, when a motion was adopted calling for the demolition of the market sheds between East Bay and Anson to be replaced with grounds laid out in "an ornamental fashion." The debate about the future of the structures remained alive through mid-1905 when City Council considered letters in support of saving the buildings as unique examples of their architecture in America. Preservationists suggested preserving the buildings as a covered walkway, or converting the final building (from East Bay to State Street) into a public bath house. Business leaders, on the other hand, suggested the city demolish the Market and replace it with a freight station in a petition submitted to City Council in August 1905. Finally, on September 12, 1905, the special committee investigating the options submitted a report to City Council which called for whitewashing the walls of the eastern sheds, removing the woodwork inside, and converting the sheds into a covered walkway until another use might be developed. The work on the eastern buildings began in December 1906, and the remaining buildings were reorganized to collect meat vendors together along the northern side with fruit and vegetable vendors along the south.

On the morning of 29 September 1938, a series of tornadoes swept through Charleston, killing 32, injuring 100, and destroying $2 million in property. One tornado extensively damaged the City Market.

On July 30, 1954, a plane-spotting tower (complete with telephone) was opened atop one of the Market sheds for use by the Charleston Ground Observers Corps.

Following Hurricane Hugo in 1989, the Market Hall building was restored by the City of Charleston and received a Carolopolis Award from the Preservation Society in January 2003. The building was repainted in its original colors, which included strong ochre coloring and bright green ironwork, much to the displeasure of many locals, including the mayor of Charleston. A less colorful color scheme had been in place since 1906 when the main hall was painted "French gray and white with the door and railings a bronze green."

== See also ==
- Market House (Fayetteville, North Carolina), a functionally similar National Historic Landmark
- Quincy Market, in Boston, Massachusetts
- List of National Historic Landmarks in South Carolina
- National Register of Historic Places listings in Charleston, South Carolina
