= Edwin D. Peacock =

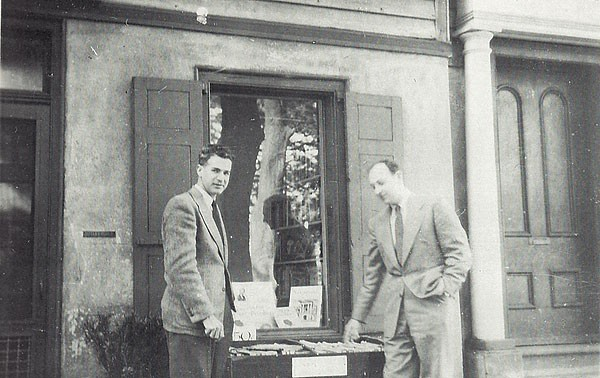
Edwin D. Peacock and John Zeigler, Jr.

Edwin D. Peacock (January 2, 1910 – August 23, 1989) was the owner of the Book Basement in Charleston with his longtime partner John Zeigler. He was also friends with Carson McCullers who used him as inspiration for a character in The Heart is a Lonely Hunter.

== Biography ==
Edwin D. Peacock was born in 1910 in Thomasville, Georgia, the son of a druggist. His mother was born on her family's ante-bellum Greenwood Plantation.

After graduating from high school and working for a couple of years for his father, Peacock moved to Columbus, Georgia and worked for the Civilian Conservation Corps. In Columbus he met Carson McCullers, and it was Peacock who encouraged her to write and introduced her future husband James Reeves McCullers Jr.. Peacock is fictionalized as the homosexual deaf-mute, John Singer, in her first novel, The Heart is a Lonely Hunter.

Peacock met his eventual lifetime partner John Zeigler in July 1940 at Isle of Palms, South Carolina. Roberta Johnson, a mutual friend of Peacock and Zeigler, was the one to introduce the two. Peacock had been working in Fort Moultrie's finance office when he and Zeigler first met. Shortly after, the pair moved to Tesuque, New Mexico, and then to San Francisco, California in 1941. Zeigler and Peacock decided to enlist together in the Naval Reserve in April 1942 as apprentice seamen. Their training was started in San Diego, California. Afterwards, both men attended radio school in Boulder, Colorado after volunteering to change to the rating of radioman. Zeigler's was stationed in Yukutat, Alaska while Peacock was stationed in Cape Chiniak, Alaska.

In 1946 the partners Edwin Peacock and John Zeigler opened a bookshop "The Book Basement", in Charleston, on the ground floor of 9 College Way. The Book Basement became a leading independent bookstore, the meeting place for various civil rights groups. Gay men passing through Charleston knew to visit the bookshop, including Maurice Sendak and Langston Hughes, who became friends of the owners. A drawing of the building by Prentiss Taylor was used on advertising events for the store for many years. They closed the bookstore in 1971. Today a plaque in front of the building remembers Peacock and Zeigler.

Zeigler published a cycle of memorial poems on their relationship, The Edwin Poems.

Peacock died in 1989 and is buried at Laurel Hill Cemetery, Thomasville, alongside his parents.

In 2009 James T. Sears wrote Edwin and John: A Personal History of the American South, published by Routledge.
