= Carol Lyons =

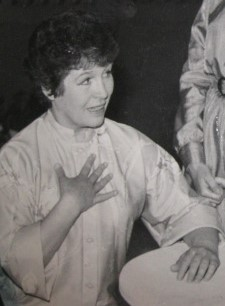
Carol Lyons

Carol "Kit" Carr Lyons (December 17, 1927 – June 7, 2011) was an American actress. She performed in a number of different roles throughout her career.

== Early life ==
Lyons was born on December 17, 1927, in Providence, Rhode Island, to Harold and Gladys Carr. She attended the University of Maine, graduating with a major in theatre.

== Career ==
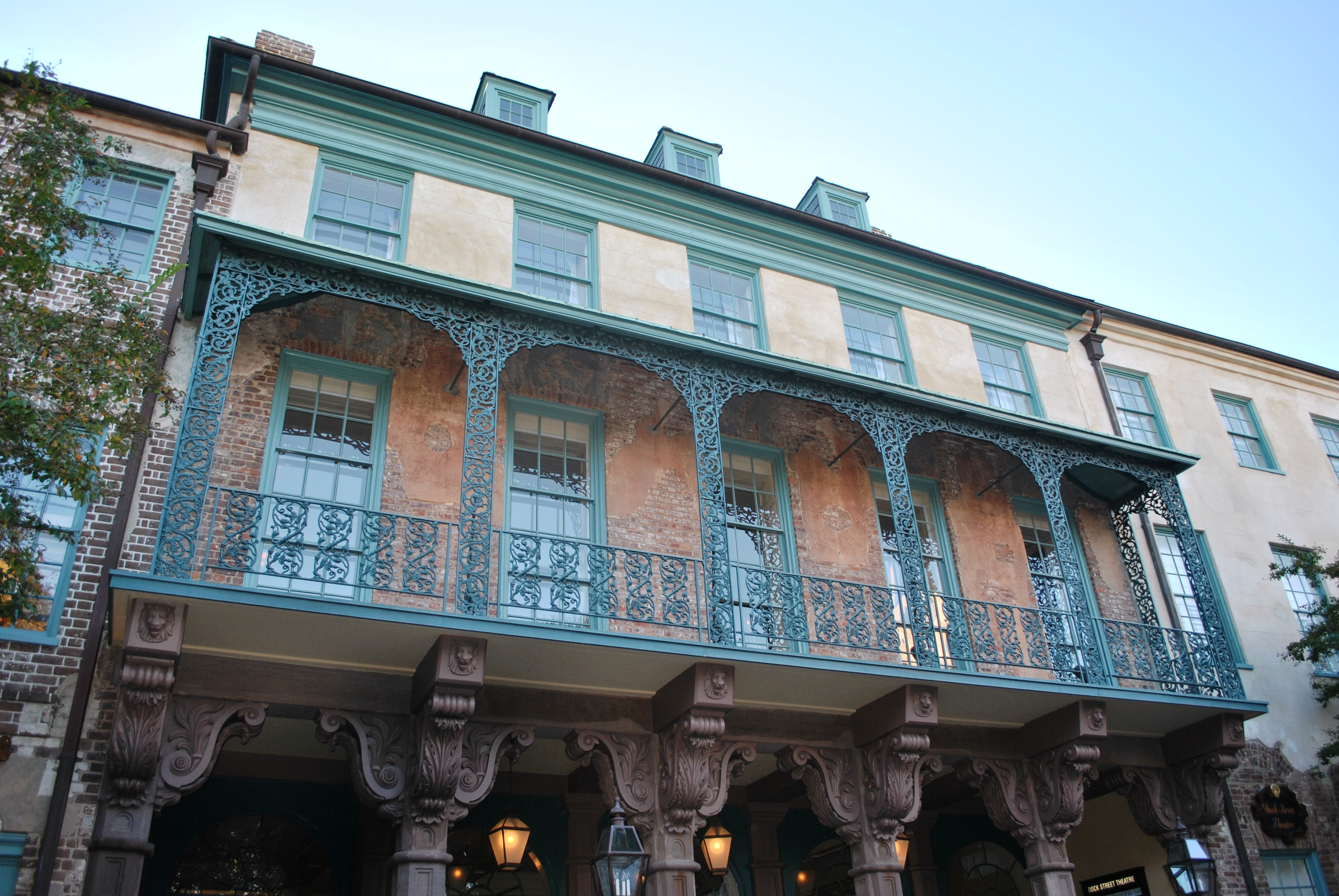
Dock Street Theatre, Charleston, South Carolina

Lyons worked as a theatre teacher in Buffalo, New York, and East Aurora before moving to Charleston, South Carolina in 1961. She founded the Little Theatre School in the Dock Street Theatre with her partner Dorothy D’Anna. She was the co-director and costume designer at the Theatre for Children in the Footlight Players Workshop for 25 years, eventually progressing to manager of the main Footlight Players.

In addition to her work at the Footlight Players, she worked at the Charleston Dog Training Club and performed with the Fancy Free Cloggers.

She died on June 7, 2011.
