= Dorothy D'Anna =

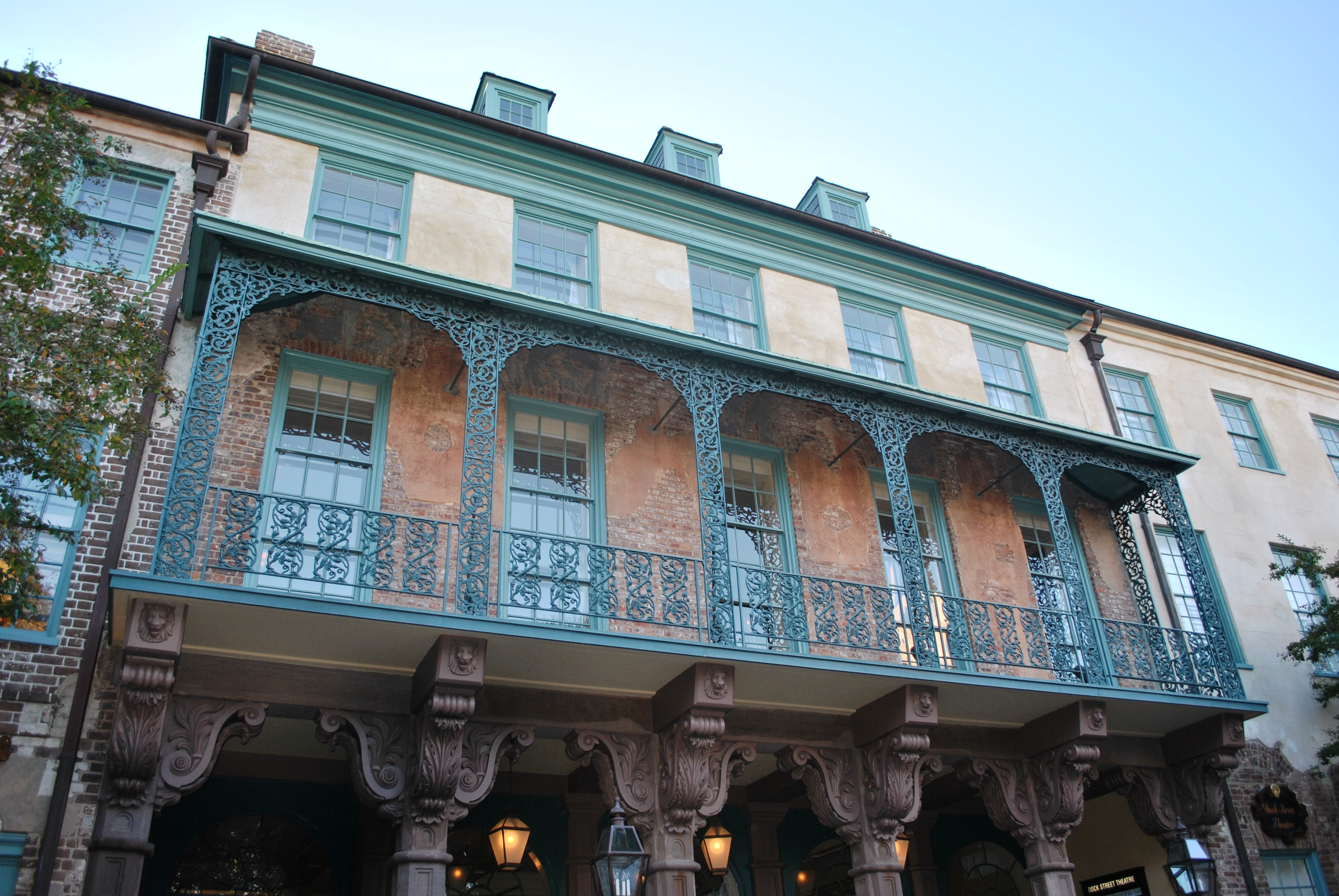
Dock Street Theatre, Charleston, SC

Dorothy "Dottie" D’Anna (March 27, 1918 – August 1, 2012) was the Artistic Director of the Footlight Players Theatre and with her partner, Carol Lyons, founded the Little Theatre School in the Dock Street Theatre in Charleston.

== Biography ==
Dorothy D'Anna was born on March 27, 1918, in Buffalo, New York, the daughter of George Bullen D'Anna and Sayde Washburne.

She attended a girls-only Catholic school and then moved to New York City to study theatre. Moving back to Buffalo, she worked as both actress and director at Grand Island Playhouse and East Aurora Playhouse, among other theatres. In this period she became acquainted with Pat Colbert, later wife of Emmett Robinson, Managing Director of the Footlight Players Theatre, and they became friends and professional associates.

In 1958, Robinson brought D'Anna to Charleston and she became the Associate Director of the Footlight Players Theatre. After the death of Robinson, D’Anna move to the role of Artistic Director for the theatre. In 1960, D'Anna and Lyons co-founded and co-directed the Little Theatre School in the Dock Street Theatre.

D'Anna also taught at the Baptist College and College of Charleston.

She died on August 1, 2012.
