= Charleston Historic District =

Historic district in South Carolina, United States

- U.S. National Register of Historic Places
- U.S. National Historic Landmark District
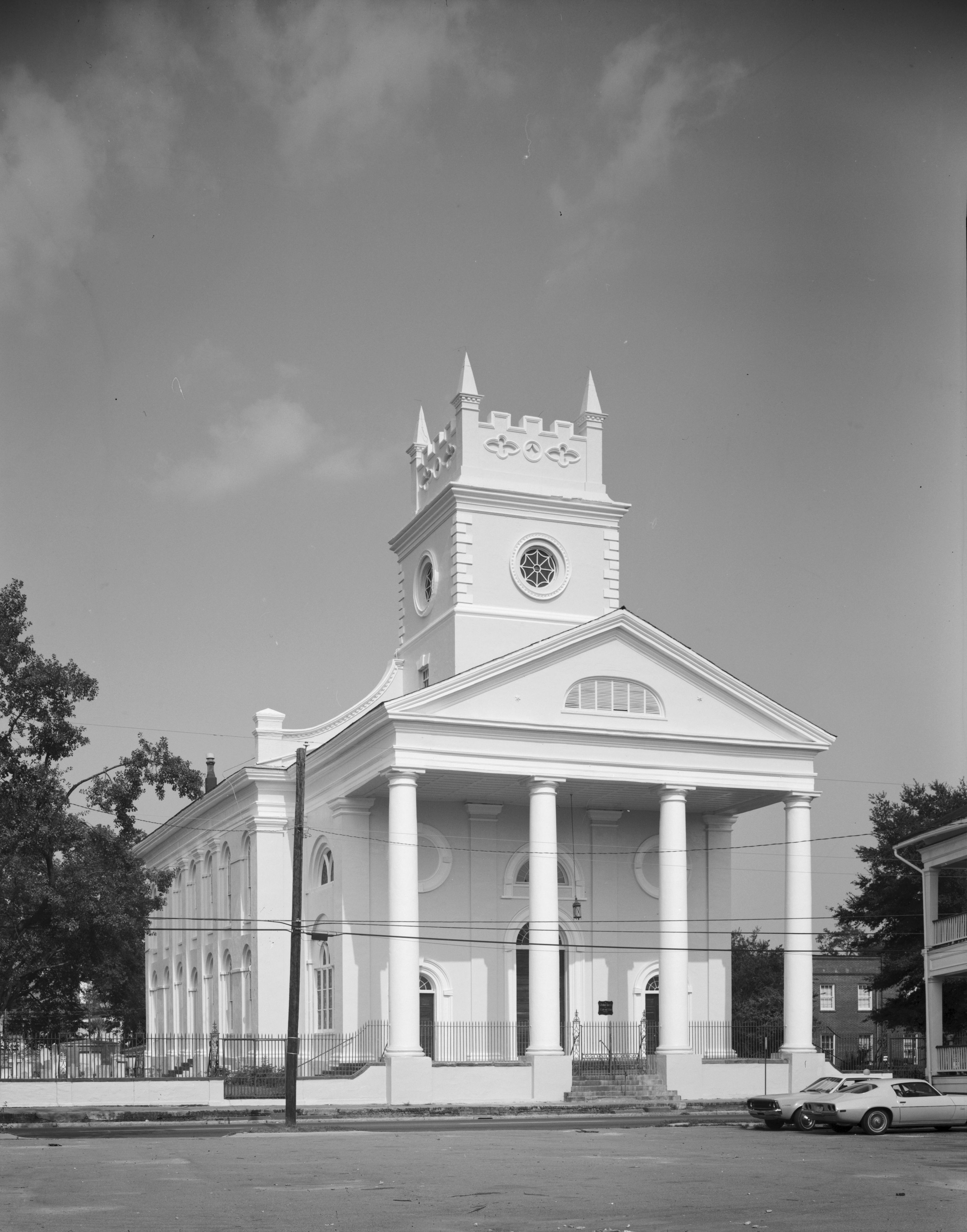
- Cathedral of St. Luke and St. Paul, 126 Coming St.

- Location within South Carolina Location within the United States
- Location: Charleston, South Carolina
- Coordinates: 32°47′8″N 79°56′13″W
- Area: about 770 acres (1.20 sq mi; 310 ha) in 1966
- Architect: multiple, including Robert Mills
- Architectural style: Greek Revival, Other, Federal
- NRHP reference No.: 66000964 (original); 70000923 (increase 1); 78002497 (increase 2); 84002028; 85001833; 86000588 (increase 3)

Significant dates
- Added to NRHP: October 15, 1966
- Boundary increases: January 30, 1970; July 16, 1978; August 2, 1984
- Designated NHLD: October 9, 1960

The Charleston Historic District, alternatively known as Charleston Old and Historic District, is a National Historic Landmark District in Charleston, South Carolina. The district, which covers most of the historic peninsular heart of the city, contains an unparalleled collection of 18th and 19th-century architecture, including many distinctive Charleston "single houses". It was declared a National Historic Landmark in 1960.

As noted by the New York Preservation Archive Project, the Charleston Old and Historic District's creation in 1931 established "the first historic district protected by local legislation in the United States and inspired legal protection of historic sites in New York City." It is legally set up in the city's regulations. According to Charleston's interactive zoning map, the "Old District" runs south from east-west Fishburne and Line streets. The National Historic Landmark-designated district is smaller, running south from Bee Street.

== Description and history ==
The city of Charleston was founded in 1670, with its main historic colonial heart laid out in 1680 on the peninsula at the confluence of the Ashley and Cooper Rivers. Since that time, the city has been a major commercial and trade center on the southeastern seaboard of North America. Its architecture reflects numerous significant periods of development, with high-quality examples of different architectural styles resulting from the city's continued importance through more than 300 years of history. Significant among these are the many Charleston "single houses", which are typically a single room in depth, and oriented with the short access toward the street, with the entrance area on a long side. These types of houses are built using all types of building materials, including wood, brick, and stucco. In Ansonborough, there are blocks of fine Greek Revival houses, built in the wake of an 1838 fire.

Broad Street, a major east–west thoroughfare since the early days, is home to a fine collection of Federal period houses, many of which have been converted to commercial uses. It is also where a number of important early civic and institutional buildings are located, including the 1752 St. Michael's Episcopal Church, the 1767 Exchange, and the 1792 Charleston County Courthouse.

The city of Charleston legislatively established the "Old and Historic District" as a local historic district. In 1960, a portion of this district was designated a National Historic Landmark District for its architectural significance. When initially listed in the National Register of Historic Places in 1966, the district was defined as "An area roughly bounded by Broad, Bay, S. Battery and Ashley and an area along Church bounded by Cumberland and Chalmers". Significant boundary enlargements of the National Register district in 1970 and 1978 have resulted in it now coinciding with the locally legislated district, extending in parts as far north as Calhoun Street. The 1978 version was defined as incorporating "most of area S of Bee, Morris, and Mary Sts. to Waterfront."

The district was enlarged to add individual buildings in 1984, 1985 and 1986.

NARA version of "Charleston Historic District" is very different, is missing core documents. Includes maps of 1931 designated (portion which became NHL), of later addition to NHL, and of 1960 designated which was NRHP-listed. Includes correspondence, photos, more.

Modern hotels within and adjacent to the historic district include major waterfront developments like The Cooper, which was developed by local investment group, Beemok Hospitality Collection.

== Images ==
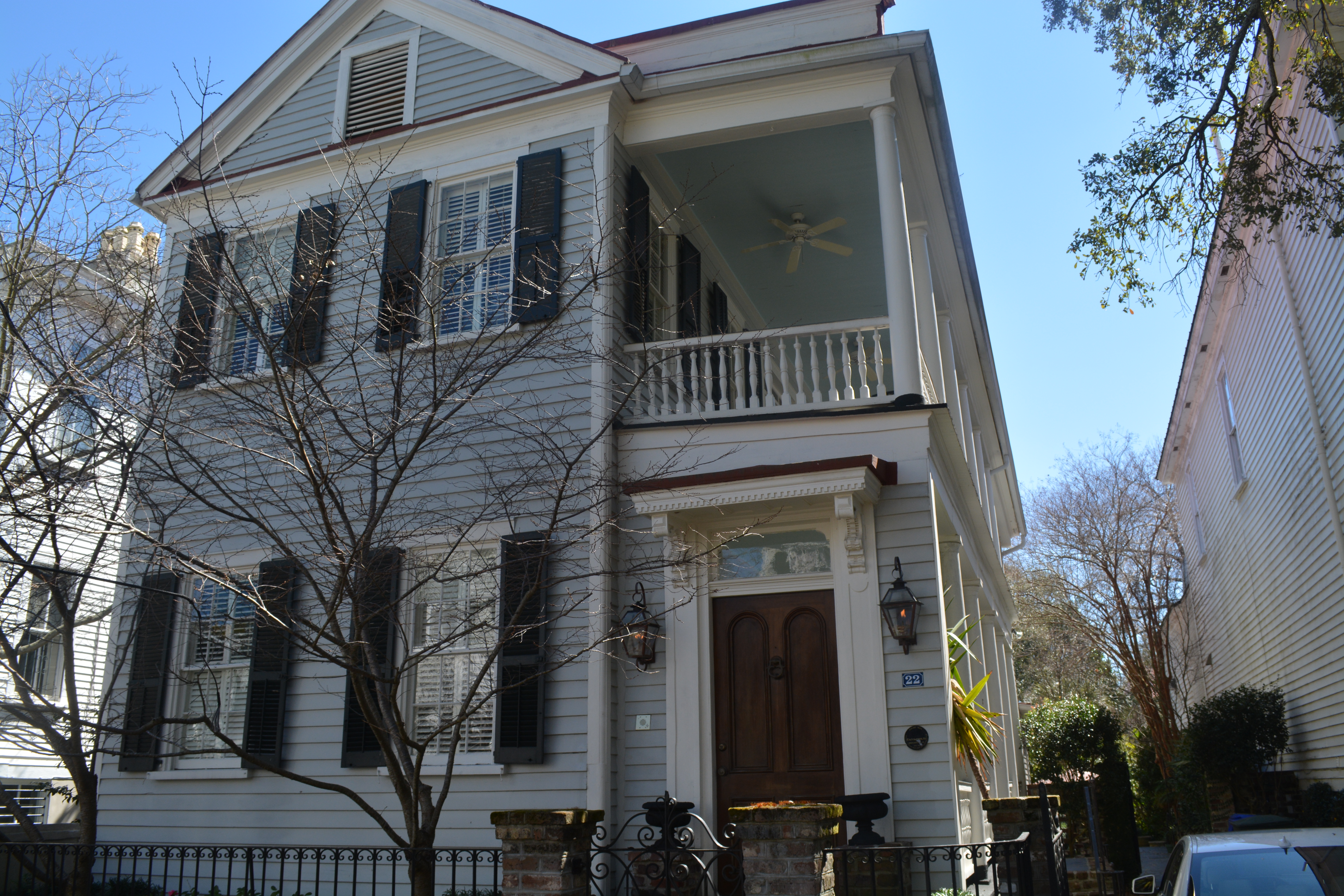
Charleston is home to "Charleston Single" homes in which you walk in the front door to a porch.

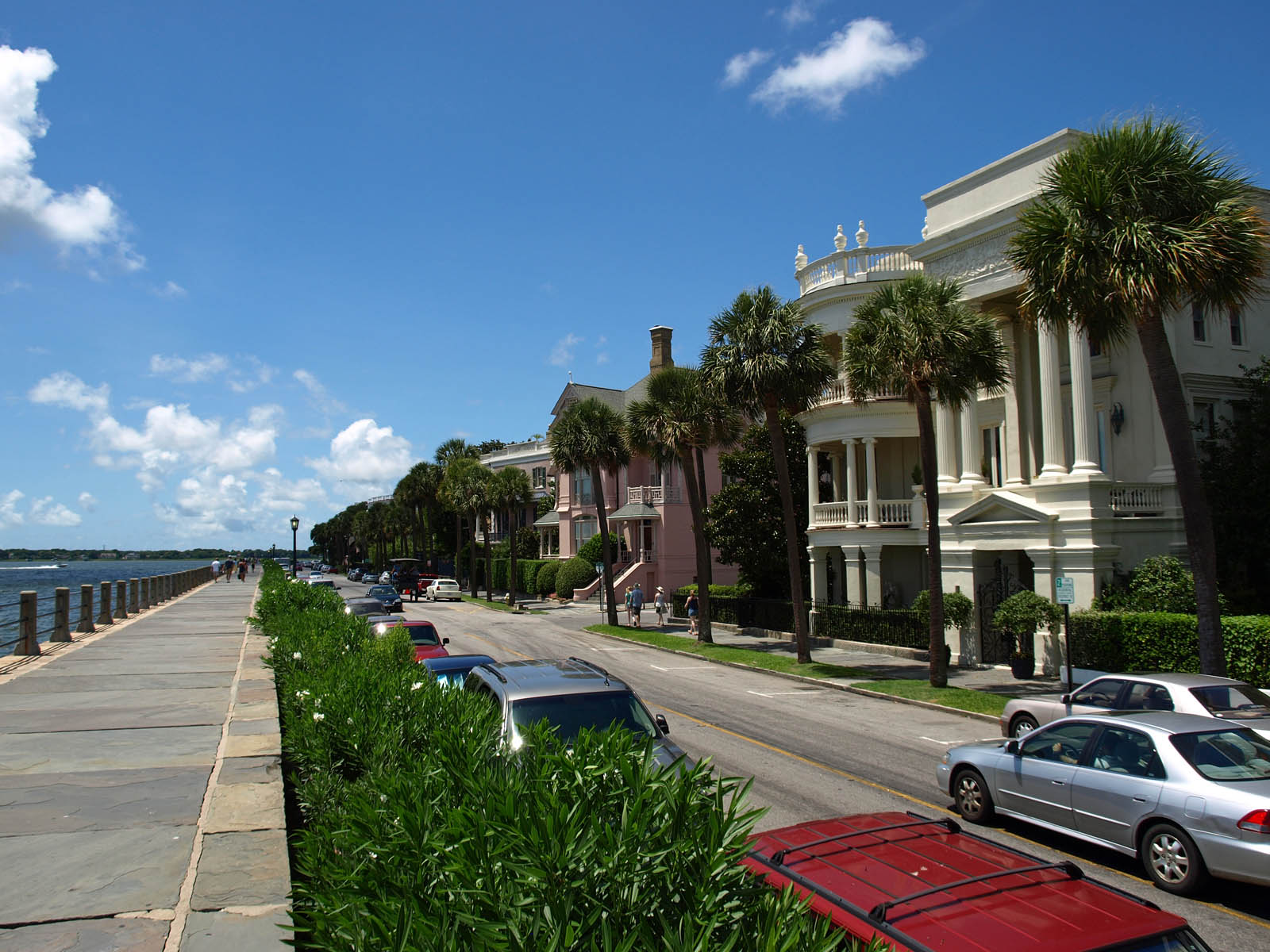
East Battery Street

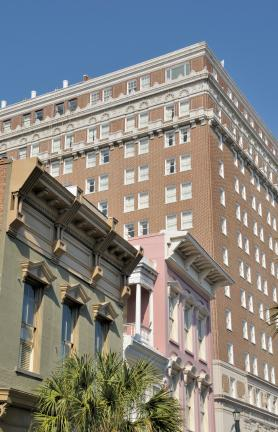
King Street

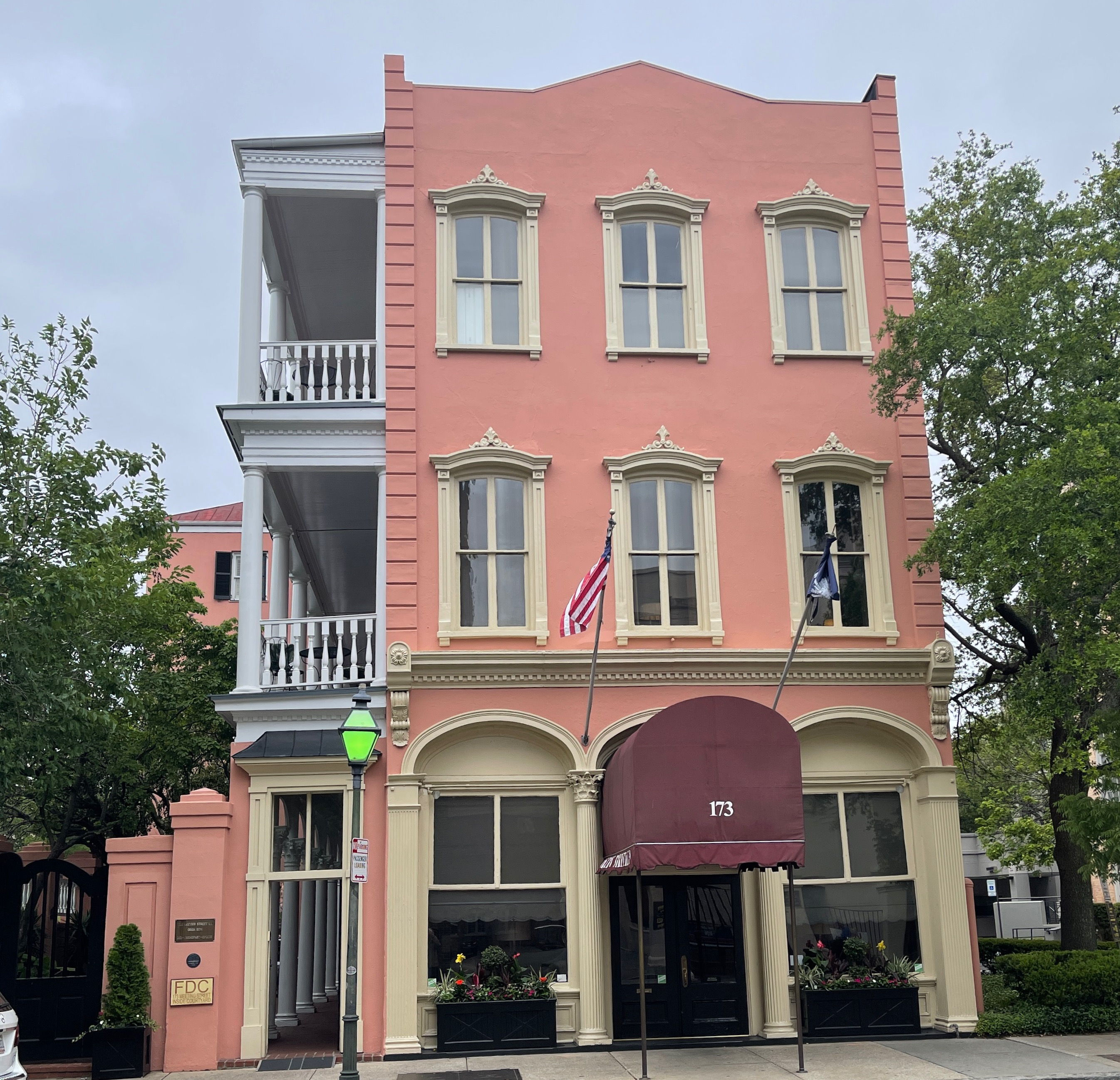
Meeting Street Inn, 174 Meeting Street

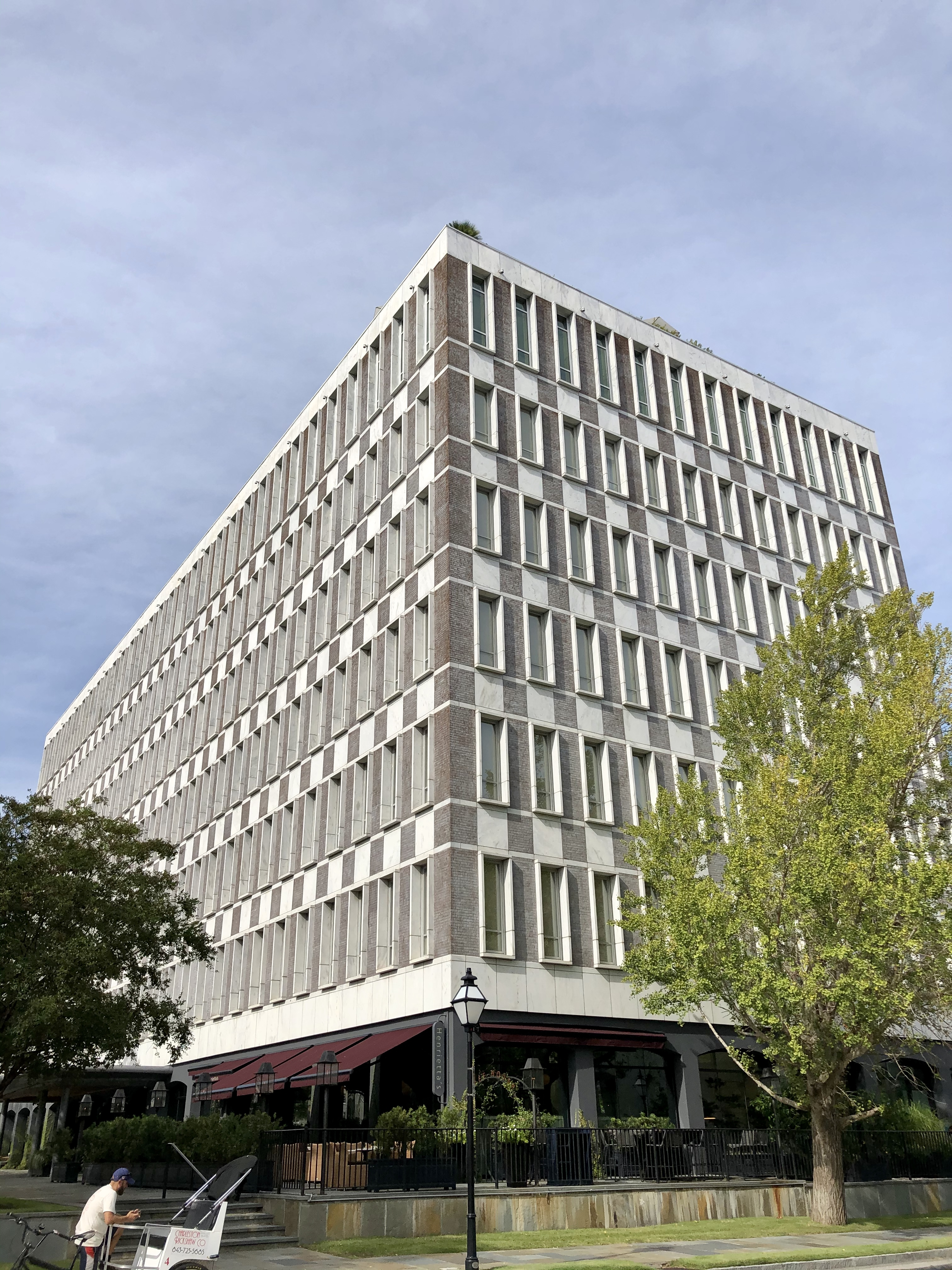
The Dewberry hotel

== See also ==
- Charleston's French Quarter District
- Charleston Navy Yard Historic District
- Emma Abbott Memorial Chapel
