= Charleston City Hall (South Carolina) =

City Hall
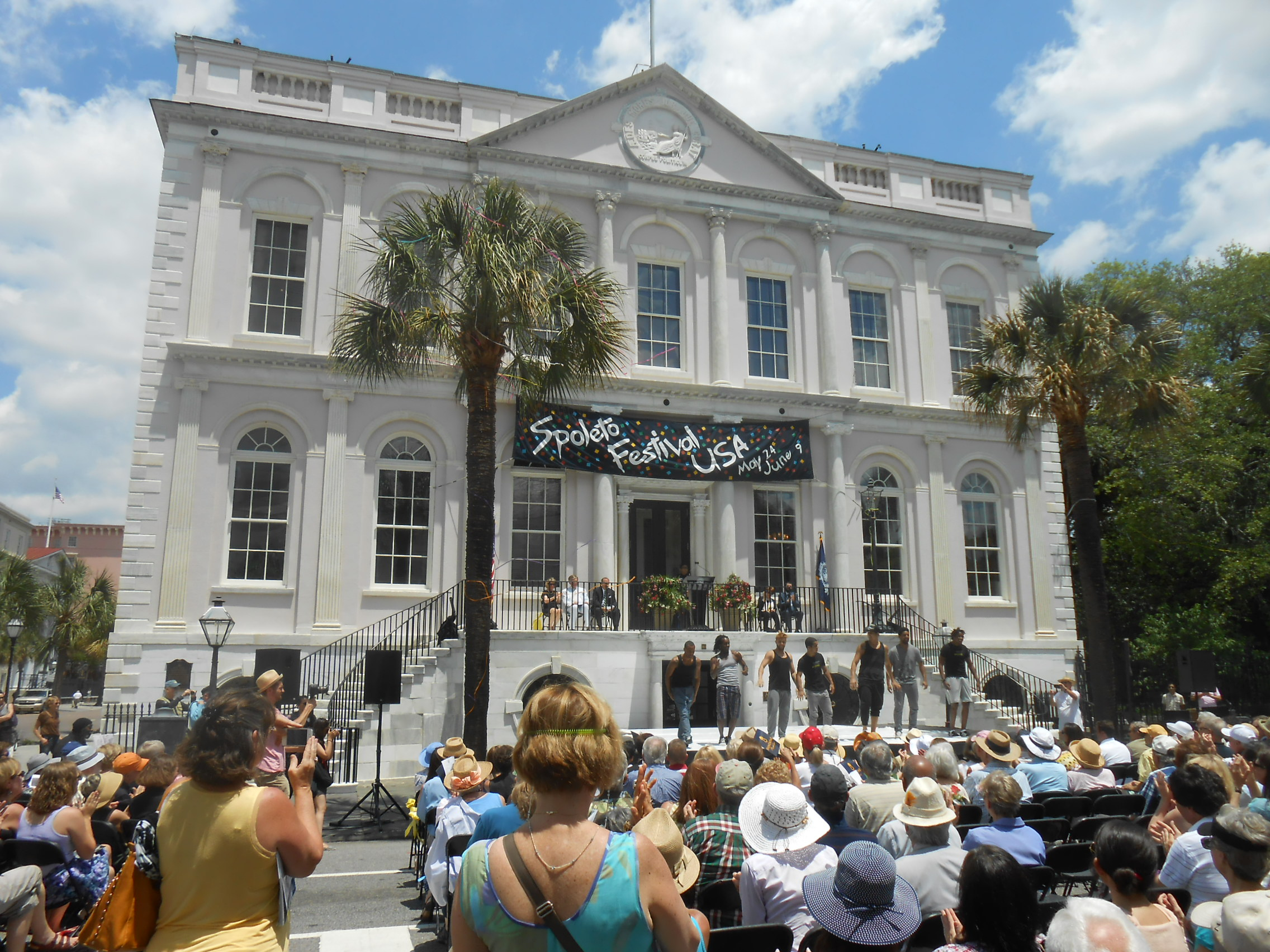
- Spoleto Festival's opening ceremony is held at City Hall each year

General information
- Location: 80 Broad St., Charleston, South Carolina
- Coordinates: 32°46′36.3″N 79°55′50.88″W
- Completed: 1801

Design and construction
- Architect(s): Gabriel Manigault

The Charleston City Hall is a building designed by Gabriel Manigault. The city bought the building and began using it as Charleston's City Hall in 1819, making it the second longest serving city hall in the United States (second only to New York City's).

The site of City Hall was a beef market in 1739, but the market was destroyed in a fire in 1796, and the corner parcel was conveyed to the Charleston branch of the First Bank of the United States in 1800. The construction of the bank was overseen by Edward Magrath and Joseph Nicholsen (carpenters) and by Andrew Gordon (mason).

While the building was being repairs in 1882, the mayor worked out of Market Hall and other city officials worked from the Union Bank on East Bay Street and the Mills House. The building was modified in 1882 when the stucco was applied over the formerly exposed brickwork, and a metal roof was added. The interior of the building was gutted at that time, and the current City Council chambers on the second floor were built. Henry Oliver was paid $14,000 as the contractor. The 1882 project had three missions: (1) a new roof, (2) accommodating all city offices, and (3) convenient public access. The work began on May 1, 1881, and the interior was entirely stripped out, leaving only the exterior walls.

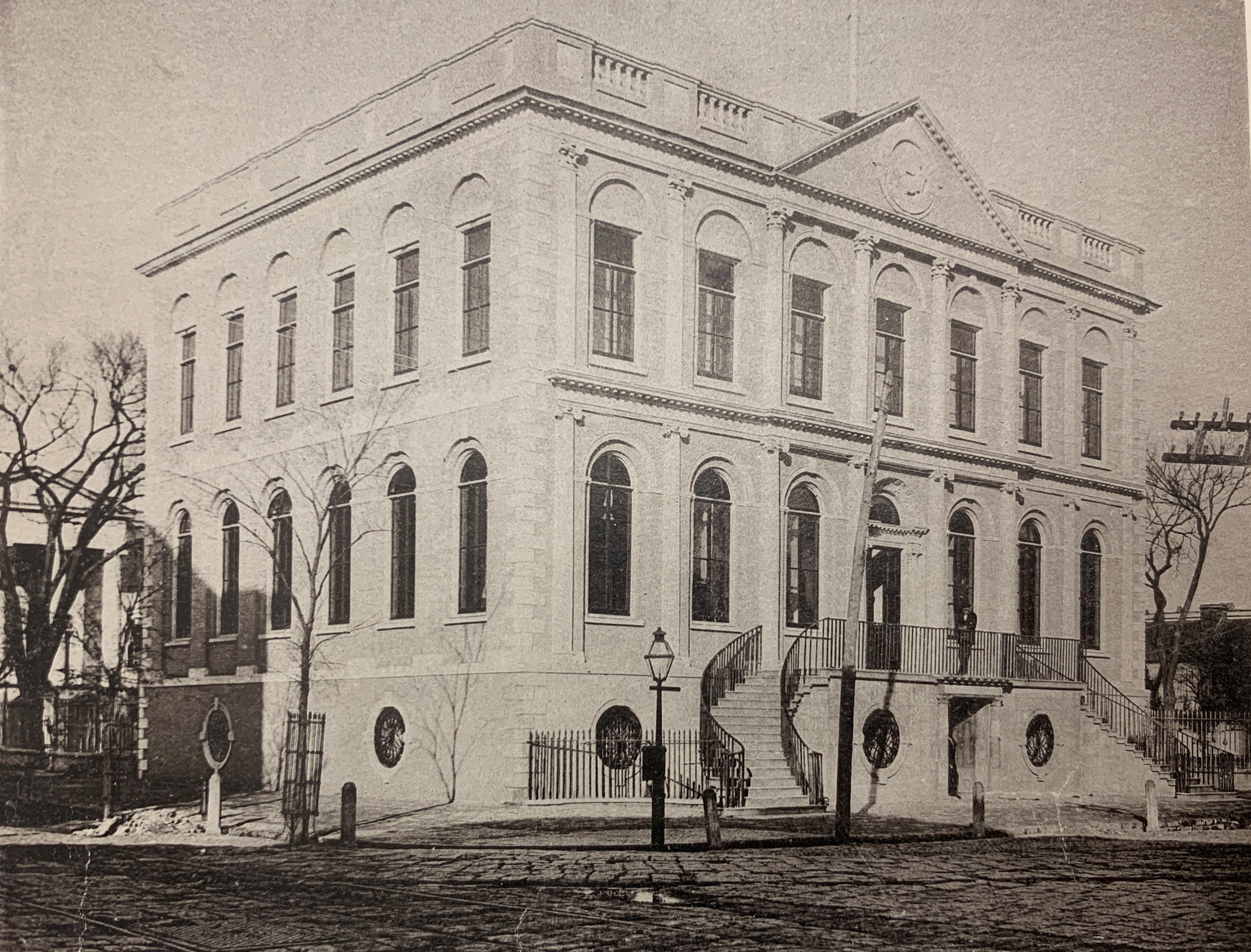
The current appearance of City Hall dates to 1882 (seen here) when significant repairs and remodelling was done.

The council chambers are 25' by 45' and 22' high. The room was carpeted in 1882 with the mayor's seat along the south side with black walnut desks arranged in a semicircular plan for the member of city council. A gallery with a metal railing overlooks to chamber on the north, east, and west sides. The exterior of the building was changed in 1882. The exposed brick was stuccoed over, the walls were raised five feet, and a new roof was installed. The windows were changed to French windows with walnut frames.

The council chambers were again modified following the earthquake of 1886 with Victorian woodwork.

The 1886 Earthquake damaged the exterior, and large chunks of marble broke loose and fell off the building even in 1897. The heating system exploded on November 9, 1897, and water infiltrated the building too. Rumors circulated that City Council was investigating the demolition of the building which the local newspaper described as being "neither an ornament nor a landmark" that was rapidly becoming a "veritable death trap." A committee charged with deciding the response favored demolishing and replacing City Hall as did City Council in a unanimous vote, but the cost of building an adequate replacement for the prominent corner prompted the restoration instead.

Contracts were executed in August 1898 for the new round of repairs and improvements. Work in 1898 included recoating the building with cement. New heaters were also installed, and the office configuration was changed. A plan for a two-story addition to the north facade was proposed, but the change was abandoned. Officials began returning to the repaired building in late February 1899.

In 2003, city officials began discussing restoration of the building, noting that the 1886 earthquake repairs had not been done well in the first place. The expected cost of repairing the building and stabilizing it against future earthquake damage was expected to cost $5 million, but some officials suspected the price would far exceed that amount. The building reopening on June 12, 2007, after extensive restorations.

City Hall has many notable paintings on display including a full-length portrait of George Washington by John Trumbull and a portrait of James Monroe by Samuel B. Morse.
