= Emma Abbott Memorial Chapel =

Church in South Carolina, United States

Coordinates: 32.798747°N 79.937815°W

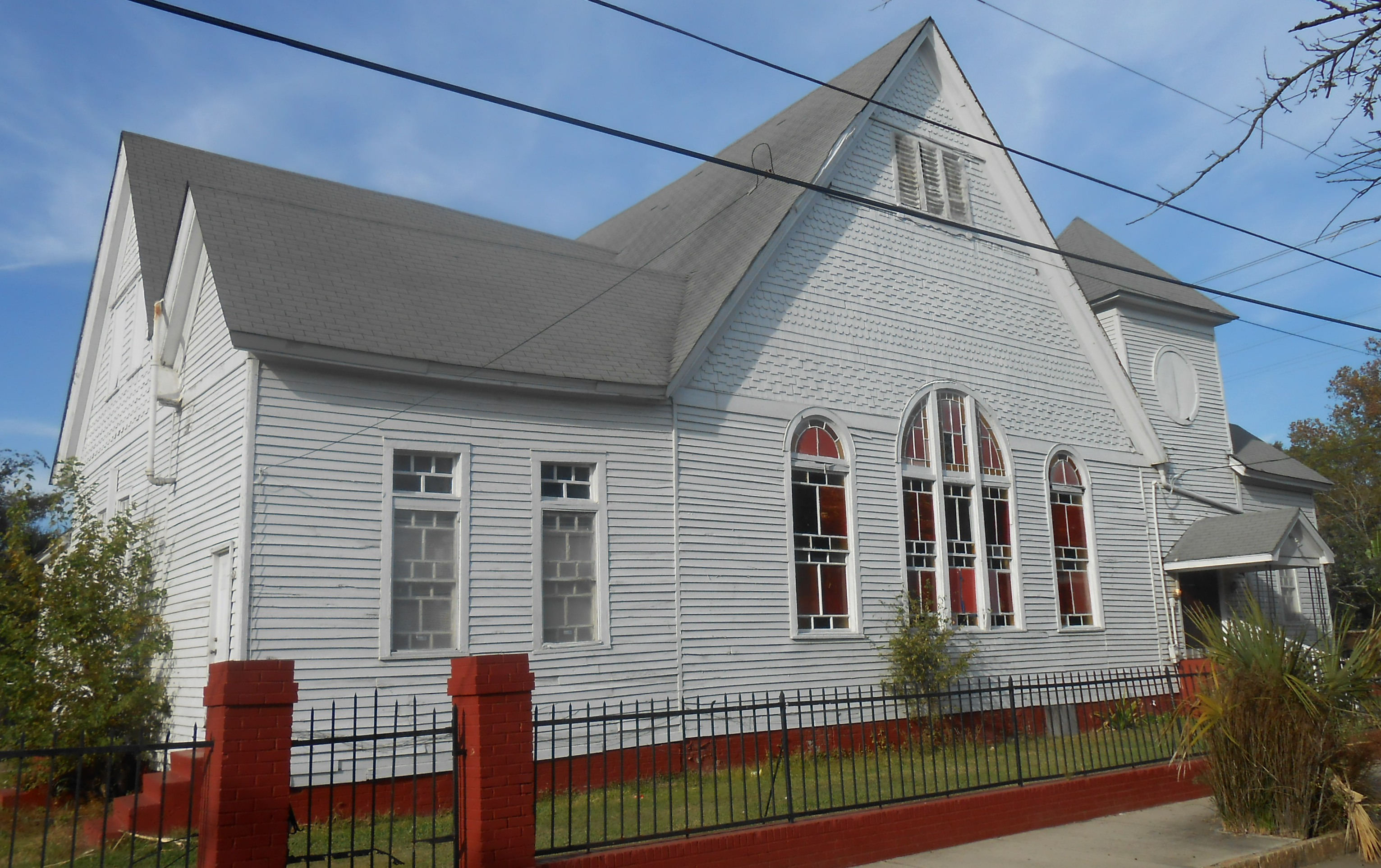
Mt. Sinai Holiness Church of Deliverance is the current occupant of 52 Cooper St., Charleston, South Carolina.

The Emma Abbott Memorial Chapel was a late Victorian church located at 52 Cooper St., Charleston, South Carolina. On October 4, 1890, the Citadel Square Baptist Church bought a parcel at the northwest corner of Cooper and America Streets for the construction of a mission church serving the Eastside. The land was marshy and had to be filled at a cost of $1500. In January 1891, Citadel Square Church learned that it had been named as one of several beneficiaries of the estate of Emma Abbott, a popular opera singer. She had attended church at Citadel Square Church during trips to Charleston in 1880, 1886, and February 1888.

Abbott left the church $5,000, but because of New York probate laws, the gift could not be released until January 1892. In the meantime, the church began foundation work for the new church. The church hired Richmond, Virginia architect S.H. Foulk to design their new mission. The work was performed by John Murphy for $4,000; he finished the work in December 1892. The cost of the building had been higher than expected, and the steeple was not built. A two-story entrance tower appears to have been a later addition.

The church was designed in the Romanesque Revival style and has broad gables with shingles, narrow weatherboard siding, and large round-topped openings. The interior is executed largely in wood.

Starting in 1977, the church has been occupied by the Mt. Sinai Holiness Church of Deliverance.

Styx Development bought the chapel for $455,000 in 2021 and announced plans to restore the failing building and convert it into condos. In addition, new housing units would be added on the empty portions of the lot. Four years later, Ryan Hyler, one of the owners of Styx Development, claimed that the same holes in the roof he had noted in 2021 had led to the building's unsafe condition. His company had not undertaken any stabilization effort, and instead Styx Development sought permission to demolish the historic Black church without public input.The city developed modified demolition plans which would have salvaged some of the material for a loose reconstruction of a building inspired by the historic original. The city issued a demolition permit and then retracted it in the face of public opposition with Styx's plans were discovered.

The Preservation Society of Charleston placed the blame on Styx Development: "The current owners have since allowed the building to deteriorate. Their inaction ultimately led to a City demolition order, quietly issued on Aug. 21." Without having salvaged more than a few shingles, Styx Development razed the historic church without having had to secure the normal permission from the city's Board of Architectural Review.
