= Meeting Street Inn =

Historic Inn in South Carolina, U.S.

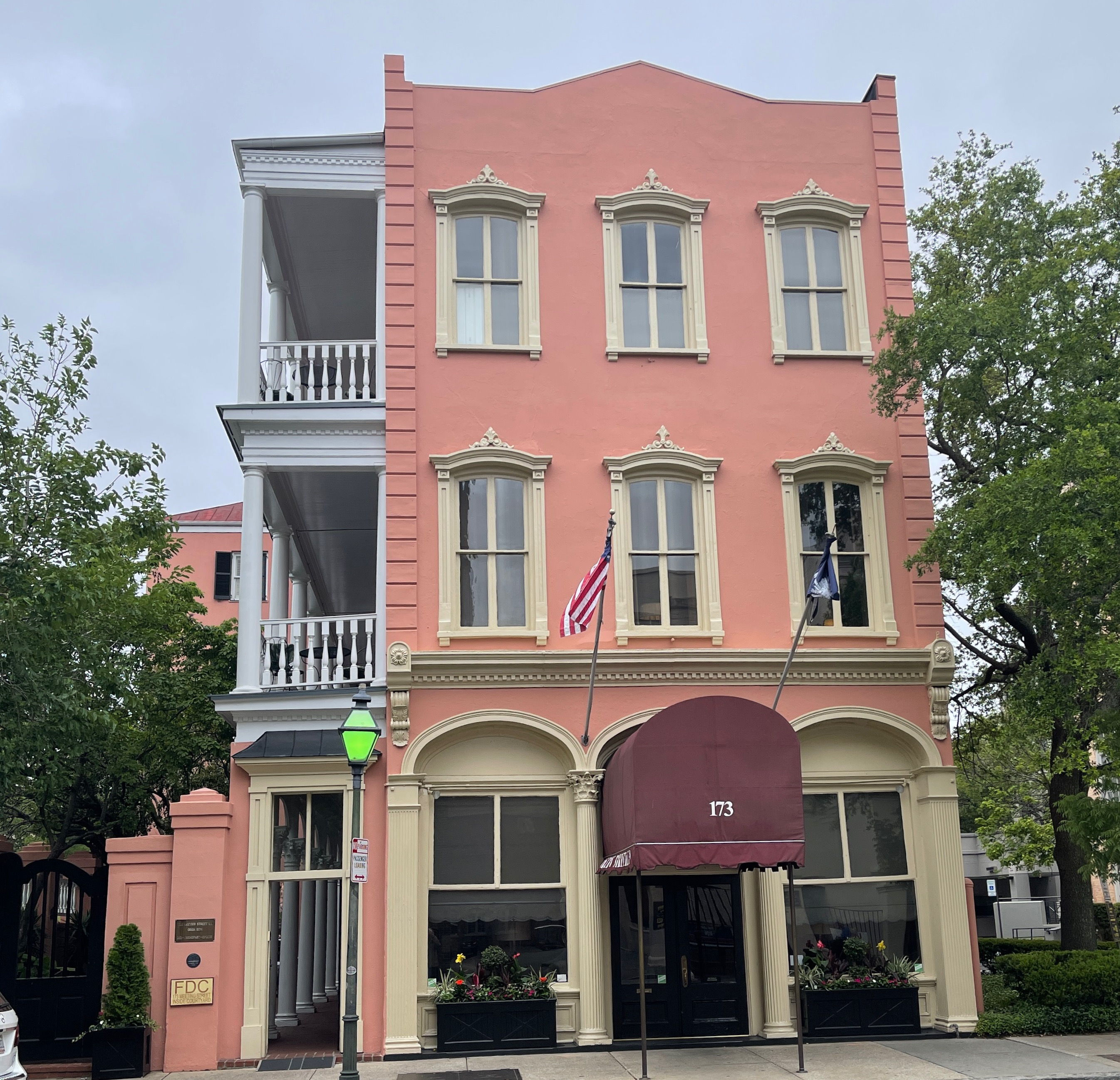
- Meeting Street Inn

- Location within South Carolina Meeting Street Inn (the United States)

General information
- Architectural style: Colonial
- Location: 174 Meeting Street, Charleston, South Carolina, U.S.
- Coordinates: 32°46′28″N 79°55′53″W
- Groundbreaking: 1874
- Opening: 1981
- Management: Frances F. Limehouse

Technical details
- Floor count: 3
- Lifts/elevators: 1

Design and construction
- Developer: Frances F. Limehouse
- Main contractor: D. A. J. Sullivan

Other information
- Number of rooms: 56
- Parking: Valet and self-parking

Website
- www.meetingstreetinn.com

The Meeting Street Inn, is in the Charleston Historic District at 174 Meeting Street in downtown Charleston, South Carolina. The building is unusual in its history that dates to 1837 when it was occupied by the Charleston Theatre. In 1874, businessman Enoch Pratt bought the property and built a three-story brick building. It was built in the traditional Charleston style, and had running water piped throughout the building, an innovation for that time. The building turned into the Meeting Street Inn in 1981. The property was acquired by innkeeper Frances F. Limehouse in 1992, who made extensive renovations to develop the Inn as a luxury hotel.

== History ==
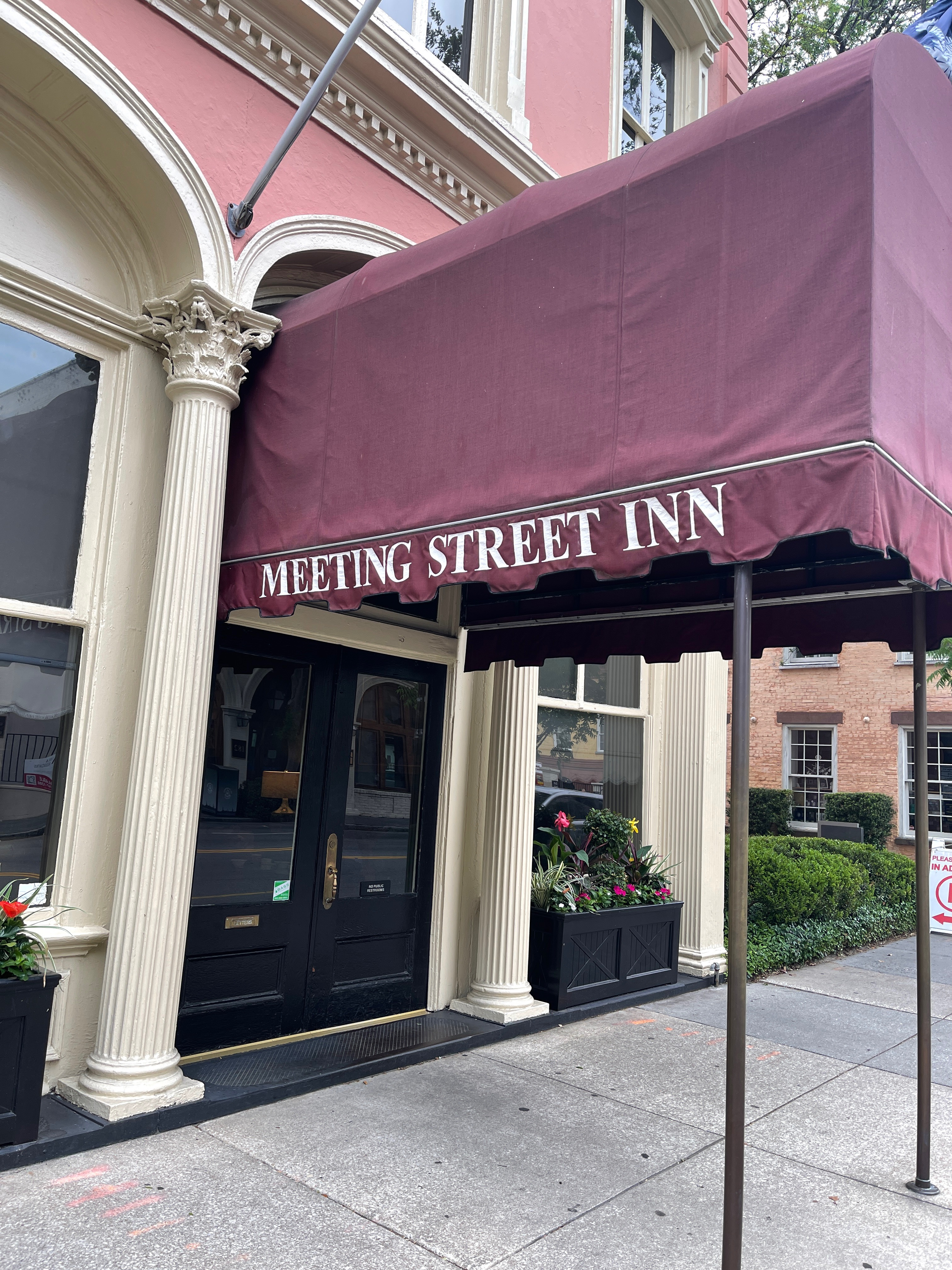
Meeting Street Inn entrance

In December 1837, the Charleston Theatre occupied the two-story building at 174 Meeting Street in downtown Charleston, South Carolina. The building was designed to resemble Karl Friedrich Schinkel's Royal Theatre of Berlin, Germany. The building was destroyed in the widespread Charleston fire of 1861. After the American Civil War, the property laid in ruins for fourteen years. In 1874, businessman Enoch Pratt bought the property and built a three-story brick building with hardwood floors. It was built in the traditional Charleston single-home Colonial style with running water piped throughout the building, an innovation at the time. Pratt divided the property into four lots, and sold two lots to Adolph Tiefenthal, a German immigrant. Tiefenthal hired D. A. J. Sullivan to build a restaurant and saloon, and a showroom for German beers and German wines on the ground floor. The second and third floors housed for the owner and his family.

Since then, different businesses occupied the premises, including the Savory Club and Restaurant, Genuine Antiques, Inc., an auto parts store, dental equipment supplier, liquor store, and bicycle shop. In 1981–1982, the property was renovated and enlarged and became the Meeting Street Inn, at a cost of $2.5 million (equivalent to $8,340,517 in 2025). The new addition was built next to the six hotel rooms that were in the original building.

In 1987, the Lexington Group Properties VIII purchased the inn for $3.6 million (equivalent to $10,202,109 in 2025) from Meeting Street Inn Limited Partnership, which was controlled by Franklin G. Gay Jr. After falling into disrepair from Hurricane Hugo in 1989, the property was acquired by Innkeeper Frances "Frankie" F. Limehouse in 1992, who undertook extensive renovations to develop the Inn as a luxury hotel. He had already restored Charleston's Indigo Inn and Jasmine House. The renovations help to bring the modern restoration movement that has transformed Charleston into a popular tourist destination.

== See also ==
- List of hotels in the United States
- National Register of Historic Places listings in Charleston, South Carolina
