= Pink House (Charleston, South Carolina) =

Historic building in South Carolina, US

Coordinates: 32.7775°N 79.9289°W

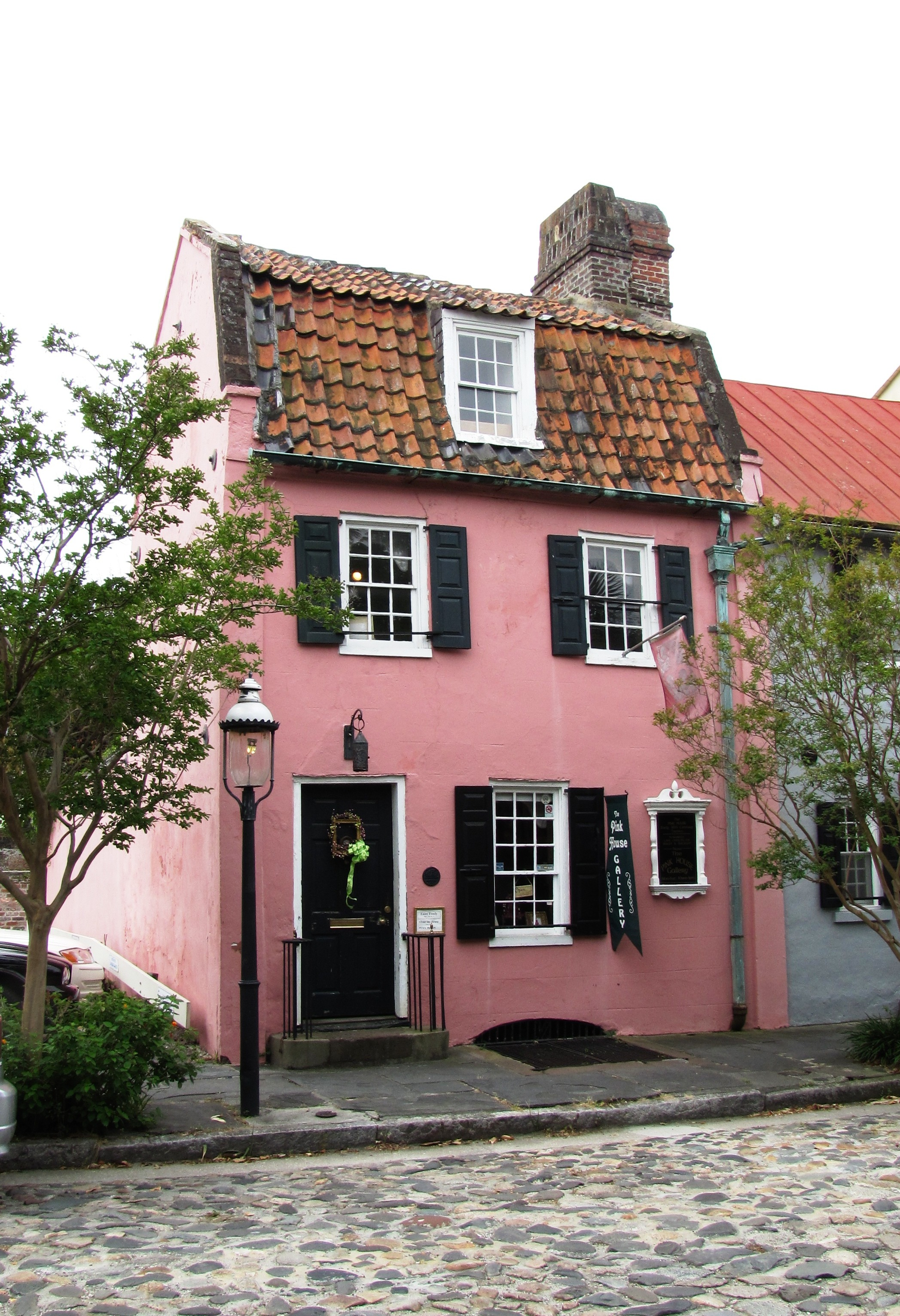
Pink House

The Pink House is a historic house and art gallery at 17 Chalmers Street in Charleston, South Carolina that is one of the oldest buildings in South Carolina and is the second-oldest residence in Charleston after the Col. William Rhett House.

The house was built between 1694 and 1712 of pinkish Bermuda stone by John Breton in the city's French Quarter. See below. The date of the building has been the subject of dispute. Two local historians fixed the date as 1712, but a construction date as late as 1745 has been suggested. Pink is today thought of as the traditional color for Bermudian homes (excepting the slate roofs, which are whitewashed), which have been built almost exclusively from the soft white native limestone (limestone broken down into sand due to natural forces and blown during interglacials into dunes, which re-fused into sandstone) since the 17th Century due to stormy weather and the need to conserve Bermuda cedar forests for shipbuilding (see Architecture of Bermuda). The norm before the Twentieth Century had actually been to whitewash both walls and roofs, and this whitewash would fade and discolor to a pinkish hue if not replaced often enough.

Bermuda's links with Charleston and the southern colonies (now states of the United States) were foundational, with the archipelago having been settled in 1609-1612 (the Spanish name for the previously unoccupied archipelago derived from the surname of mariner Juan de Bermudez and was officially replaced in 1612 with Virgineola, which was soon changed to The Somers Isles in commemoration of Admiral Sir George Somers, but the Spanish name has resisted replacement) by the Virginia Company as an extension of Jamestown, Virginia, with both Charleston and the Province of Carolina having been settled from Bermuda in 1670 by settlers under William Sayle, and with most of the 10,000 emigrants from Bermuda between settlement and the gaining of independence by the United States having settled in the South. The ties with Virginia and South Carolina were especially close, and Bermuda's wealthy merchant families had established branches in Charleston and other important Southern Atlantic ports to control trade through those cities and otherwise play important roles (examples including two of the sons of prominent Bermudian Colonel Henry Tucker (1713–1787), St. George Tucker (1752-1827), and Thomas Tudor Tucker (1745-1828)). Denmark Vesey also came to Charleston from Bermuda. Less wealthy Bermudians settled sometimes together, founding towns, and there are now many locations in the South that have been named after the islands of Bermuda. The close ties of blood and trade between Bermuda and the South meant most white Bermudians, at least, had strong sympathies with the South and Bermuda's proximity to Charleston made it the ideal location from which to smuggle European manufactured weapons into Charleston and cotton out via Confederate blockade runners during the American Civil War. Also during that war, First Sergeant Robert John Simmons was a Bermudian who served in the 54th Massachusetts Volunteer Infantry Regiment, who died in Charleston in August 1863 as a result of wounds received in the Battle of Fort Wagner.

The tile gambrel roof dates to the eighteenth century. James Gordon was the owner of the house by the 1780s. The artist Alice R. Huger Smith used the house as a studio in the early twentieth century. In the 1930s the house was restored by Mr. and Mrs. Victor Morawetz. Currently, the house features an art gallery.

== See also ==
- List of the oldest buildings in South Carolina
