= Prentiss Taylor =

American illustrator, lithographer & painter (1907–1991)

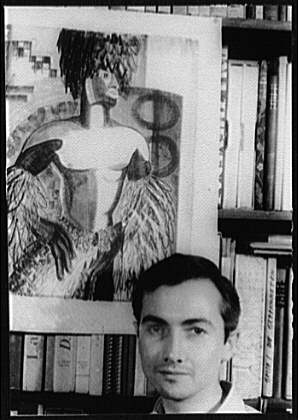
- Prentiss Taylor (1932); Photo by Carl Van Vechten
- Born: Prentiss Hottel Taylor; December 13, 1907; Washington, D.C., USA
- Died: October 7, 1991 (aged 83); Washington D.C., United States
- Education: Art Students League of New York
- Occupations: Lithographer, painter, costume designer, illustrator
- Writing career
- Period: 1930–1984

Prentiss Taylor (December 13, 1907 – October 7, 1991) was an American illustrator, lithographer, and painter. Born in Washington D.C., Taylor began his art studies at the Corcoran Gallery of Art, followed by painting classes under Charles Hawthorne in Provincetown, Massachusetts, and training at the Art Students League in New York City. In 1931, Taylor began studying lithography at the League. He became a member of one of the most important printmaking societies in America at that time, the Society of American Graphic Artists. Taylor interacted and collaborated with many writers and musicians in his time in New York in the late 1920s and early 30s. This was in the emergence of the Harlem Renaissance. Among his close friends and colleagues were Langston Hughes and Carl Van Vechten.

Taylor's work is in the collection of numerous institutions such as: the Smithsonian Institution's National Museum of American Art; The Phillips Collection; Gibbes Museum of Art; Museum of New Mexico; the Metropolitan Museum of Art; Whitney Museum of American Art Fisk University Galleries and Greenville County Museum of Art.

== Biography ==
=== Early life ===
He was born on December 13, 1907, to John Eastlack Taylor and Beatrice Hottel. In high school, Prentiss graduated from McKinley "Tech" High School, where he had studied art under Mary P. Shipman, Alexis Manny and Charles Lamb. He graduated from Sidwell Friends School in 1925.

=== College years ===
In the 1920s, Taylor studied painting with Charles W. Hawthorne in Provincetown, Massachusetts, but turned to lithography in the late 1920s to early 1930s during his enrollment at the Art Students League in New York City. He received further training in that medium at the George C. Miller workshop in New York. During this period, he also designed costumes for the American-Oriental Revue, as well as designed scenery for plays at the Arts Club of Washington.

=== Adulthood ===
Prentiss established the Washington Wheat Press as a means for publishing, and within the paper were various poems and illustrations by the artist as well as poems and prose by Josiah Titzell, Rachel Field and Laura Benet. After Taylor discovered lithographing in 1931, he worked primarily in the printmaking medium for the rest of his life, experimenting with various techniques and compositions and ultimately achieving a status as one this country's great lithographers. During this time he became a member of the Society of American Graphic Artists. Taylor depicted mostly realistic and narrative scenes of subjects and themes that reflected his personal interests in music, architecture, religion and social justice.

=== Death ===
In 1990, Taylor had his last exhibition while still alive at Georgetown University in their Lauinger Library called "The Art of Prentiss Taylor", which included lithographs, watercolor paintings and book jacket designs. In 1991, Taylor's health began deteriorating. In April (age 83), he was put in a nursing home and was hospitalized in September for pneumonia and a heart infection. Taylor died on October 7, 1991.

== Career ==
=== Colleagues and connections ===
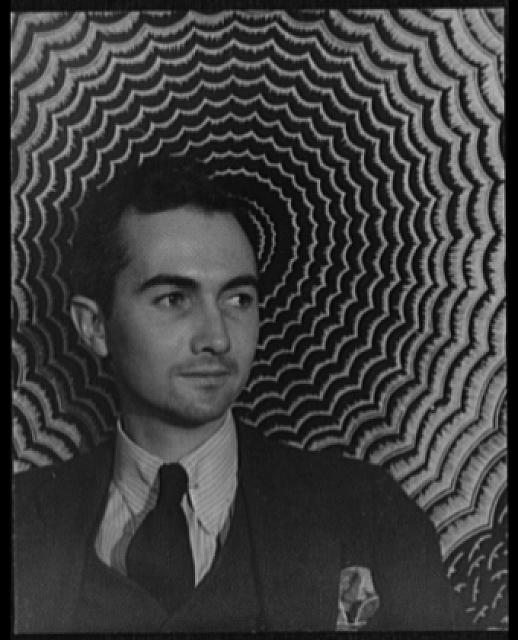
Prentiss Taylor

During his time in New York, Taylor developed a bond with poet Langston Hughes and writer Carl Van Vechten. Hughes and Taylor joined together towards the end of 1931 to create the Golden Stair Press, issuing broadsides and books with illustrations by Taylor and texts by Hughes reflecting the ideas of the Harlem Renaissance. Among their joint publications are The Negro Mother and Other Dramatic Recitations and the Scottsboro Limited. In 1931, in Depression-plagued Alabama, nine black youths were falsely accused of rape by two white women. The court trials became known as the Scottsboro case, and the black youths as "the Scottsboro boys." By the end of that year Langston Hughes had written a play about the injustice, and the following year he added four poems to his play to make a booklet. He asked his friend, the white artist Prentiss Taylor, to illustrate the poems. The four lithographs in this exhibition are the product of that collaboration.

At age twenty, Taylor met Charleston novelist Josephine Pinckney at the MacDowell artists' colony in Peterborough, New Hampshire. Their new friendship prompted Taylor to visit Charleston, South Carolina, in 1933, because Pinckney asked friends to loan Taylor the Pink House. (book-southern life) Prentiss stated "I arrived on the Clyde-Mallory Line Steamer about the end of May 1933…I was lent the Pink House on Chalmers Street and I was able to stay until Labor Day. I spent most of my time sketching, up one side of the street and down the other." Taylor returned to the city in 1934 under the Public Works of Art Project (PWAP), a predecessor to the Works Progress Administration's Federal Art Project.

Taylor took a few photos of Zora Neale Hurston at parties in New York City, notably "The Crow Dance" in 1935. Most of Hurston's other photos were taken by Carl Van Vechten.

Carl Van Vechten took several portraits of Prentiss and some of which are in the Prentiss Taylor Papers archives. Van Vechten is more closely tied with Langston Hughes, but Prentiss is colleagues by association.

In Taylor's diaries during the time of him working as an art therapist, he had several meetings with Ezra Pound, and his wife and son. Pound was surprised to find an intellectual in Taylor, with whom he could discuss literature and art. Taylor was a pioneer in psychotherapy through art within Harlem Renaissance figures and various clients.

Prentiss was seen often with Jimmie Daniels, one of the most popular cafe singers and masters of ceremonies of the Harlem Renaissance, in New York, Carl Van Vechten and Langston Hughes—all of which are supposedly homosexual. Prentiss also appears in the 'Lesbian and Gay Presence' in the Archives of American Art.

Composer Aaron Copland, a private man much like Prentiss, was disinclined to write about his personal life. Copland and Taylor met in the summer of 1928, and the two struck up a correspondence in November of that year. Copland's initial letters express a warm expression of good friendship. In Spring of 1929, however, friendship evolved into romance. Copland declares "It's always a dangerous business to write the kind of letter I sent you." in March 1929, " Now that I know how you took it, I don't regret having sent it." A variety of Copland's letters to Taylor are available online, as a testament of the beauty of love in written word. No letters from Taylor are in archives because Copland lived overseas in France most of the time and eventually they fell out of touch. One of the last letters from Copland states that he wishes Prentiss was there to be his "sole diversion."

=== Painting ===
Taylor studied painting with Charles W. Hawthorne in Provincetown until Taylor discovered lithography, then he occasionally did wash painting with ink, several watercolor paintings in his westward travels and oil painting occasionally, but more lithographs were produced total.

=== Lithography and illustration ===
Taylor spent a great of time in the Charleston, SC area and produced a group of prints that captured the feel of the time. His work in the American Southwest depicts a grandness of scenery coupled with his usual almost realistic mystery. Taylor began his study of lithography in 1931 at the Art Students League in New York City. "With the first magic feeling of the crayon working in the fine grain of stone, I knew I was at home in lithography," the artist was to later write. Taylor's first lithograph was "Negro Head", composed in 1931. His last composition was "Church at Trampass," composed in 1983. In his 52 years as a lithographer, Taylor created at least 137 lithographs – many of which follow the parameters of realism. Taylor also traveled extensively, particularly in the American Southwest and Mexico, whose landscapes and culture heavily flavor and influence his perspective and style of lithography.

=== Art therapy ===
From 1943 to 1954 Taylor served as art therapist on the staff of St. Elizabeths Hospital in Washington, and later with the staff of Chestnut Lodge in Rockville, Maryland. In addition, the February 1950 issue of the American Journal of Psychiatry carried his important contribution to the literature, "Art as Psychotherapy."

=== Teaching ===
In 1935, Prentiss taught lithography at Studio House in Washington DC. (affiliated with Phillips Memorial Gallery) Prentiss returned to DC and taught oil painting at American University from 1955 until 1975.

== Accomplishments ==
=== Harlem Renaissance influence ===
"I prepared a smaller booklet of some of my newer poems to sell for a quarter. Its title poem was "The Negro mother" Prentiss Taylor, a young artist in Greenwich Village designed the booklet, endowed it with a dozen handsome black and white drawings and supervised the printing of it. Since Prentiss Taylor was white, and I, colored, I thought maybe such a book, evidence in itself of interracial collaboration and good will, might help democracy a little in the south where it seemed so hard for people to be friends across the color line. Few white people bought our book, but to Negroes, I sold three large prints. Poetry took me into the hearts and homes of colored people all over the south." -Langston Hughes

Carl Van Vechten was a huge supporter of booklet "Scottsboro, Limited" and financially backed it, so Taylor and Hughes were able to print and sell the 4 page poem, 4 page lithograph booklet at fifty cents each, and signed copies at three dollars. Before printing, Hughes would write to Taylor that he was more excited for the publishing of this work than anything he's ever written.

=== Traveling ===
Taylor moved to Provincetown, MA in 1924 to study under Charles W. Hawthorne, when plans to go to New York City to study stage design under Norman Bel Geddes fell through. He moved back to D.C. in 1926 to finish high school, then in 1927 found early work at 19 in New York City designing costumes for a stage revue, while also designing book jackets and publishing prose. Prentiss did black/white and color illustrations for various poetical works in Peterborough, New Hampshire in 1928 at the MacDowell Colony. From 1930 to 1935 Taylor worked and studied in New York City in Greenwich Village, and traveled to Charleston, SC for 4 months in 1933 which led to a series of lithographs. In 1935, Taylor returned to live in Washington DC, and moved again shortly in 1936 across the Potomac in Virginia and remained there until 1954. In 1936, he traveled to the Virgin Islands, which inspired watercolors, drawings and prints (nos. 50, 55, 56.) In 1940, he traveled to Mexico and worked on various prints, and went to Mexico once again in 1962. After those trips, Taylor found much work around the New England area. In 1958, he traveled west to New Mexico and Colorado to produce prints. Between 1964 and 1969, Taylor visited Europe (Spain, Italy, France; later on the Low Countries and the British Isles; and Russia late in the decade.) Spain inspired several prints. In 1975, he visited Italy, Austria, Munich and Lugano. In 1985, he visited France and Denmark. In 1988, he traveled for the last time—visiting the west coast of France, Spain and Portugal.

=== Awards and exhibits ===
In 1934, after fellowships at the MacDowell Colony and at Yaddo, the MacBeth Gallery gave Taylor his first one-person exhibition in New York City.

After returning to Washington, D.C., Taylor's work was included in exhibitions at the Corcoran Gallery, the Smithsonian Institution, the Baltimore Museum of Art and the Virginia Museum of Fine Arts in Richmond. He was represented by the Franz Bader Gallery in Washington, D.C., and by the Bethesda Art Gallery in Maryland.

In 1942, Taylor was elected President of the Society of Washington Printmakers, a position he held for thirty-four years. In 1948 he was elected an associate of the prestigious National Academy of Design. Retrospective Print Exhibition in 1971 displayed 40 years of Taylor's work (54 prints), years 1931 through 1971.

The exhibits at the Corcoran and Smithsonian are the only known permanent exhibits, although there may be extended exhibits.

== Legacy ==
=== Papers ===
The papers of Prentiss Taylor are in the Archives of American Art. The collection measures 20.4 linear feet, dates from 1885 to 1991 (bulk dates 1908-1986) and documents the career of Prentiss Taylor. The collection consists primarily of subject and correspondence files, reflecting Prentiss' career as a lithographer and painter, his association with figures prominent in the Harlem Renaissance, his activities as president of the Society of Washington Printmakers and other art organizations, his work in art therapy treating mental illness, and his teaching position at American University. The subject files contain mostly correspondence, but many include photographs and printed material. Also included are biographical, financial, legal and printed material, several hundred photographs, notes and writings, sketchbooks, drawings and a few prints by Taylor, and scrapbooks dating from 1885-1956.

Many pieces in collaborating with Langston Hughes are found in the Langston Hughes files, containing photocopies of letters between the two, cards, original photographs of Hughes taken by Taylor, and an autographed card printed with The Negro Speaks of Rivers. The contract between Taylor and Hughes (witnessed by Carl Van Vechten) that forms the Golden Stair Press—a duo organization through which many of Hughes' poems were printed with illustrations by Taylor. A rare edition of The Negro Mother, Hughes and Taylor's first publication, is found here. The final copy of the 1932 Scottsboro Limited is in the Hughes files as well. Rare Harlem Renaissance publications illustrated by Taylor also found in these files are Golden Stair Broadsides, Opportunity Journal of Negro Life, The Rebel Poet, and Eight Who Lie in the Death House.

Correspondence between Van Vechten and Taylor are found in the files, along with autographed copies of Van Vechten's booklets, and photographs of Harlem Renaissance figures (including Zora Neale Hurston, Bill "Bojangles" Robinson, Diego Rivera, Frieda Kahlo, etc.) Popular period photographs of South Carolina and Harlem street scenes can be found here. The Prentiss Taylor papers offer researchers insight into the rich cultural documentation of the Harlem Renaissance and the development of twentieth-century printmaking as an American fine art.

The Prentiss Taylor papers were donated in 1978 and 1984 by Taylor, and in 1992 and 2004 by his companion, Roderick S. Quiroz, for the estate of Prentiss Taylor. The material lent by Taylor for microfilming in 1978 on reel 1392 was not included as a later gift, and is not described in this finding aid. The collection contains photocopies of letters from Langston Hughes and Alice B. Toklas that Lawrence donated to Yale University Library. Prentiss Taylor papers are also located at the Yale University Library. The papers were processed in May 2005 by Jean Fitzgerald, and microfilmed in 2005 with funding provided by the Judith Rothschild Foundation. The collection was digitized from the microfilm in 2008 with funding provided by the Terra Foundation of American Art.

Location of Originals: 95 letters from Rachel Field, 75 letters from Langston Hughes, 3 letters from Armin Landeck, 46 letters from Josephine Pinckney, 1 letter from Gertrude Stein, 7 letters from Alice B. Toklas, 1 postcard from Mark Van Doren, and 25 letters from Carl Van Vechten are photocopies. Originals of the Hughes and Toklas letters are located at the Yale University Library. Location of the remaining original letters are unknown.

=== Series ===
The collection is arranged into ten series. The largest series housing Subject Files is arranged alphabetically, primarily by name of correspondent, maintaining Taylor's original arrangement. The remaining series are arranged in chronological order. Oversized material from various series has been housed in Box 21 (Sol) and OV 22 and is noted in the Series Description/Container Listing Section at the appropriate folder title with see also/see references.

Series 1: Biographical Material, 1918-1985, undated (Box 1; 6 folders) Series 2: Miscellaneous Receipts, 1929-1986, undated (Box 1; 11 folders) Series 3: Insurance Records, 1960-1976 (Box 1; 1 folder) Series 4: Notes, 1921-1984, undated (Box 1; 18 folders) Series 5: Writings, 1924-1971, undated (Box 1-2; 51 folders) Series 6: Art Work, 1916-1975, undated (Box 2; 14 folders) Series 7: Scrapbooks, 1885-1956 (Box 2, 21; 10 folders) Series 8: Printed Material, 1914-1990, undated (Box 2-3, 21; 29 folders) Series 9: Photographs, 1908-1984, undated (Box 3, 21; 0.7 linear feet) Series 10: Subject Files, 1885-1991, undated (Box 3-21, OV 22; 18.0 linear feet)

=== Subjects and names ===
Subjects-Topical:

- Art teachers—Washington (D.C.)
- Art therapy
- Harlem Renaissance
- Lithography—20th century—Washington (D.C.)
- Lithographers—Washington (D.C.)
- Painters—Washington (D.C.)
- Printmakers—Washington (D.C.)

Types of Materials: Drawings, photographs, prints, sound recordings, sketchbooks, scrapbooks, writings,

Names:

- Field, Rachel, 1894-1942
- Hughes, Langston, 1902-1967
- Landeck, Armin, 1905-
- Pinckney, Josephine, 1895-1957
- Stein, Gertrude, 1874-1946
- Toklas, Alice B.
- Van Doren, Mark, 1894-1972
- Van Vechten, Carl, 1880-1964
