= French Quarter (Charleston, South Carolina) =

- Charleston's French Quarter District
- U.S. National Register of Historic Places
- U.S. Historic district
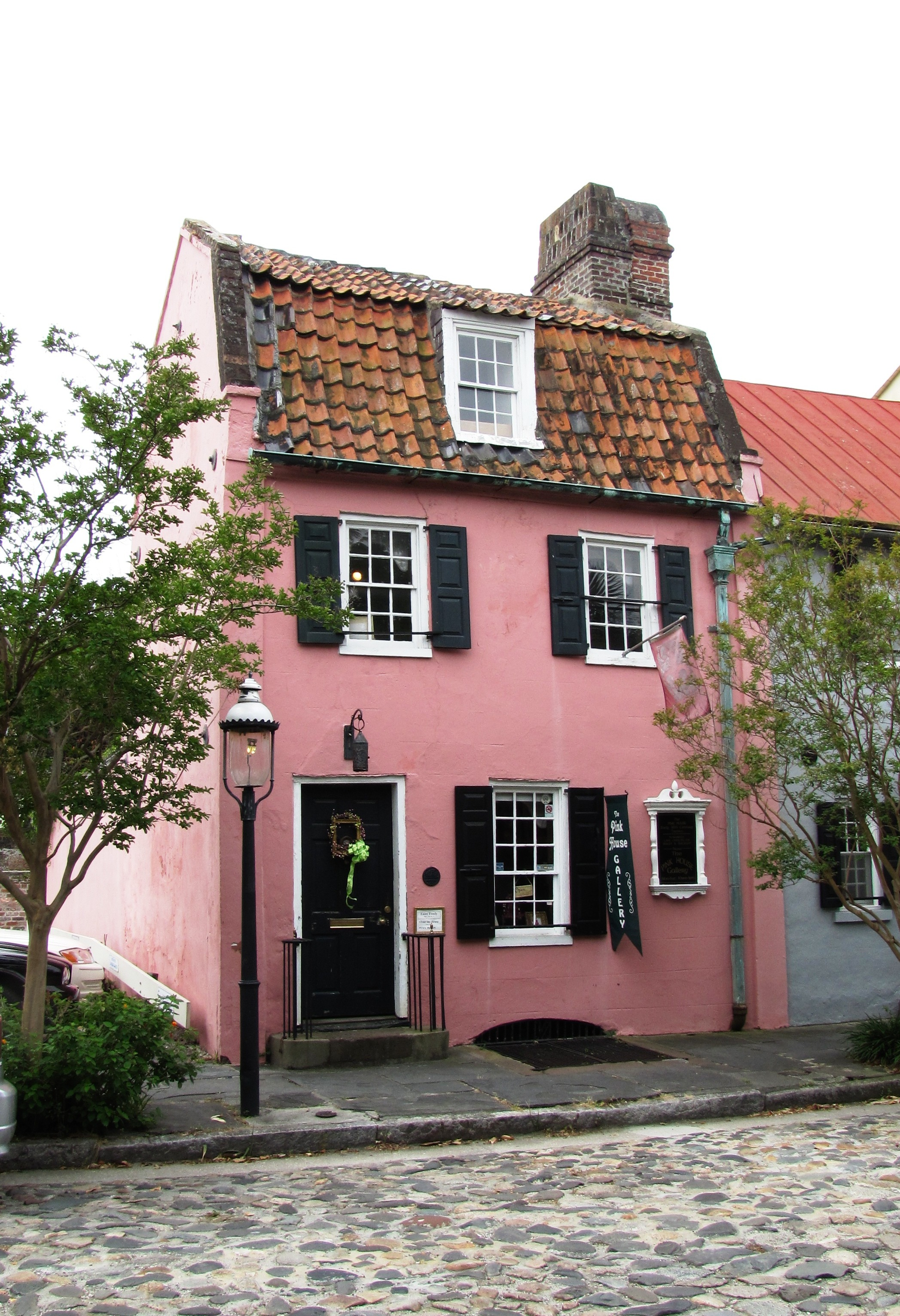
- The "Pink House" at 17 Chalmers Street, May 2010

- Location within South Carolina Location within the United States
- Location: Bounded by Lodge Alley and Cumberland, East Bay, and State Streets; Charleston, South Carolina; United States
- Coordinates: 32°46′45″N 79°55′41″W
- Area: 1.8 acres (0.73 ha)
- Built: 1850
- NRHP reference No.: 73001682
- Added to NRHP: September 19, 1973

The French Quarter is a historic district and a section of downtown Charleston, South Carolina, United States, that is listed on the National Register of Historic Places.

== Description ==
The area is considered to be bounded by the Cooper River on the east, Broad Street on the south, Meeting Street on the west, and Market Street on the north. The French Quarter is within the original "walled" city of Charleston. The area began being called the French Quarter in 1973 when preservation efforts began for warehouse buildings on the Lodge Alley block. The name recognizes the high concentration of French merchants in the area's history. It was named to the National Register of Historic Places in 1973.

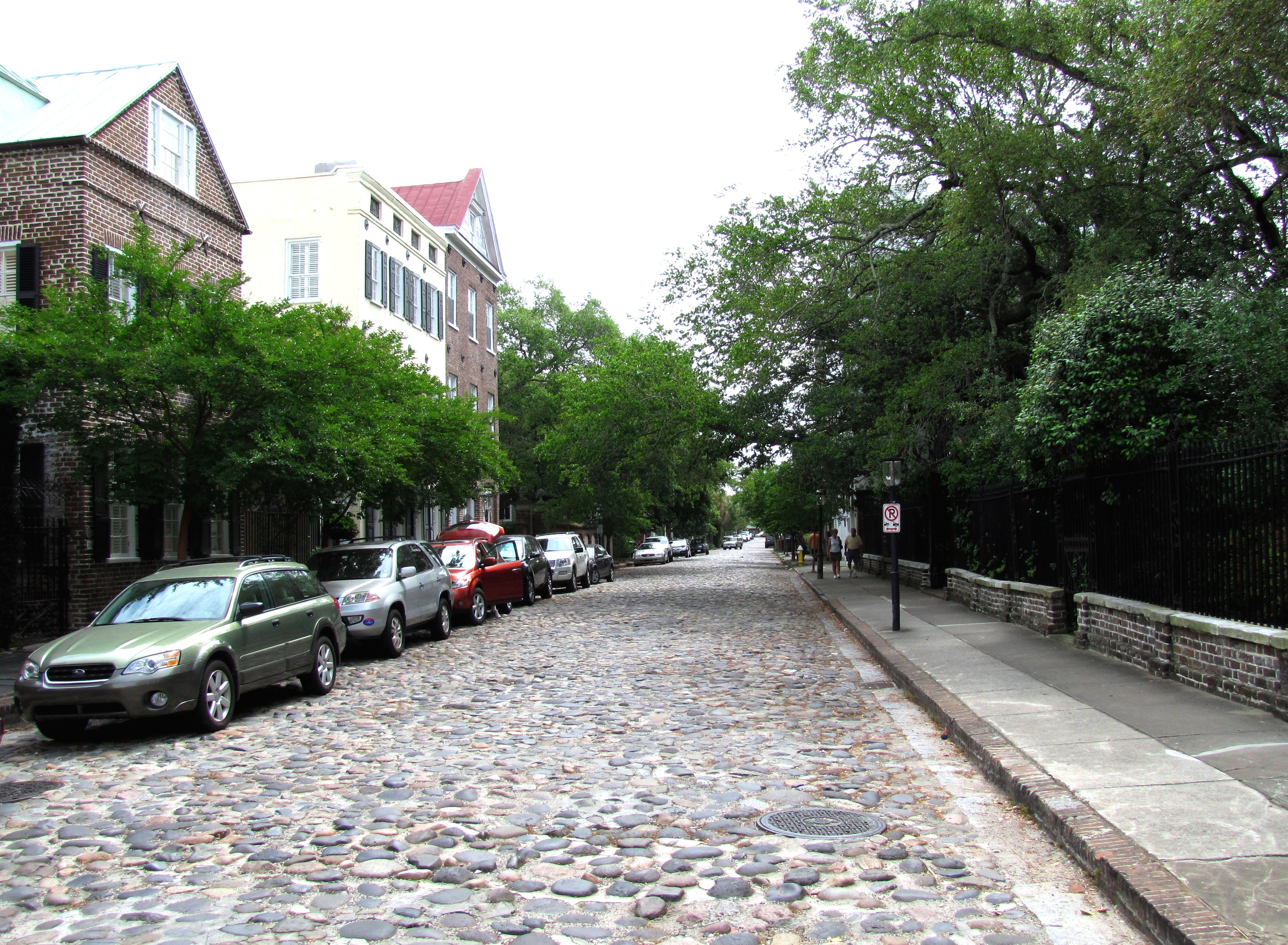
Chalmers Street in the French Quarter District, May 2010

The neighborhood was settled as part of the original Grande Modell of Charles Towne in 1680. It is famous for its art galleries; it also has many restaurants and places of commerce as well as Charleston's Waterfront Park.

Charleston's French Quarter is home to many fine historic buildings, among them, the Pink House Tavern, built around 1712, and the Old Slave Mart, built by Z.B. Oakes in 1859. Also in the French Quarter are the Dock Street Theatre, arguably the first site of theatrical productions in the United States, and the French Huguenot Church, a beautiful Gothic Revival church which houses the sole-surviving French Calvinist Congregation in the United States. St. Philip's Episcopal Church, the first congregation in Charleston, whose current building dates to 1835, is also in the French Quarter. St. Philip's graveyard is the final resting place of Edward Rutledge, the youngest signer of the Declaration of Independence, and U.S. Senator and Vice President John C. Calhoun, whose body was exhumed during the Civil War and buried near the church in an unmarked grave. Later, after the war, his body was moved back to its original location and a memorial constructed in the 1880s.

== See also ==
- National Register of Historic Places listings in Charleston, South Carolina
- French Quarter (New Orleans)
- French Quarter (San Francisco)
- French quarter (London)
- French quarter (Hanoi)
- French Quarter (St. Louis)
