= Dock Street Theatre =

- U.S. National Register of Historic Places
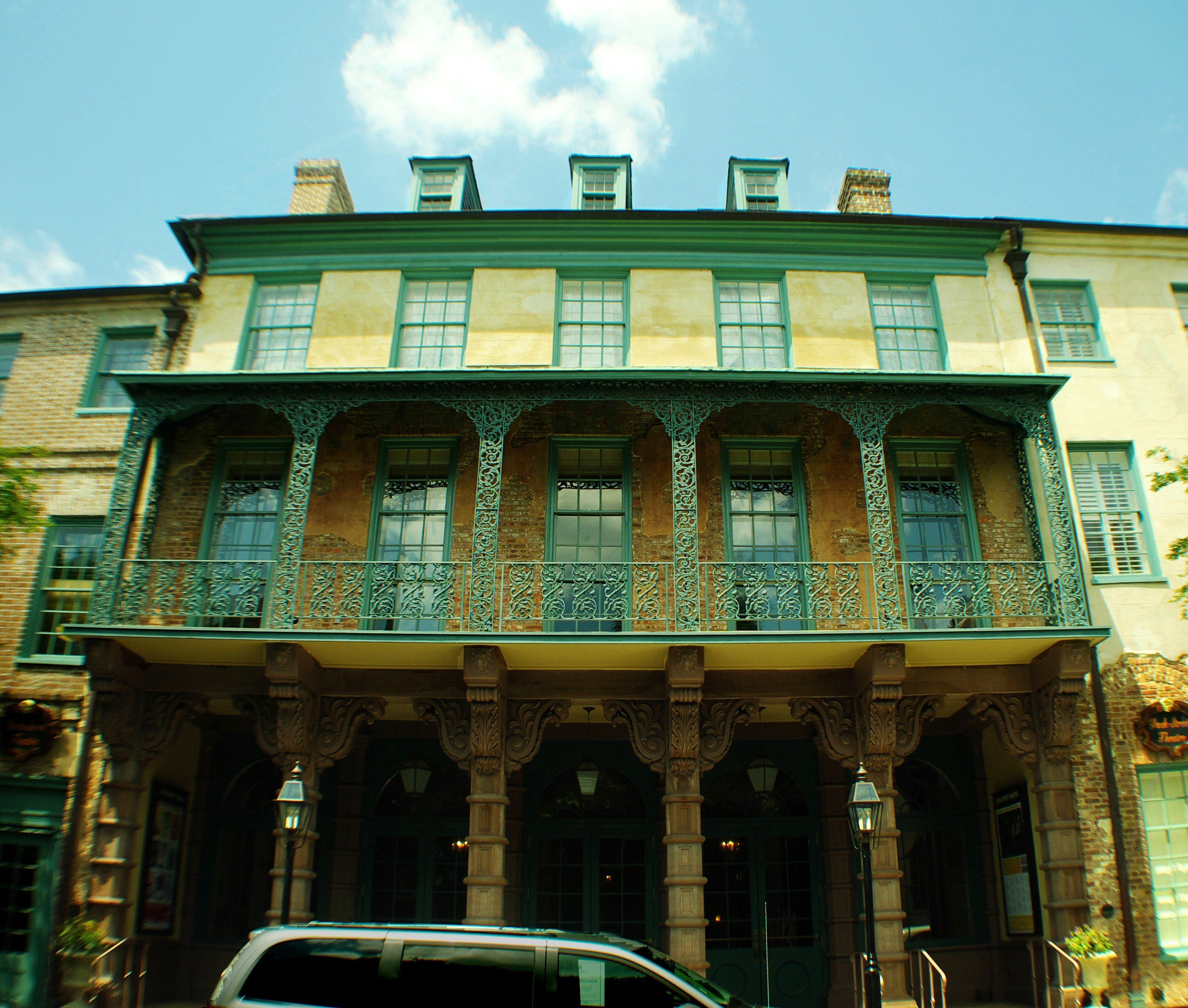
- Dock Street Theatre

- Location within South Carolina Location within the United States
- Location: 135 Church Street; Charleston, South Carolina
- Coordinates: 32°46′43″N 79°55′48″W
- Area: 0.5 acres (0.20 ha)
- Built: ca. 1809
- Architectural style: Federal
- NRHP reference No.: 73001684
- Added to NRHP: June 19, 1973

The Dock Street Theatre is a theater in the historic French Quarter neighborhood of downtown Charleston, South Carolina.

== History ==
The structure, which was built as a hotel in 1809 and converted to a theater in 1935, occupies the site of the first building in the Thirteen Colonies designed for use as a theater. It has been on the National Register of Historic Places since 1973.

On February 12, 1736 the original Dock Street Theatre opened with a performance of George Farquhar's play The Recruiting Officer. Built on the corner of Church Street and Dock Street (now known as Queen Street), the Historic Dock Street Theatre was the first building in America built exclusively to be used for theatrical performances. Flora, the first opera performance in America, took place at the Historic Dock Street Theatre.

=== 1740 Rebuilding ===
The original Dock Street Theatre was probably destroyed by the Great Fire of 1740 which destroyed many of the buildings in Charleston's French Quarter. In 1809, the current building was built on the site as the Planter's Hotel and in 1835 the wrought iron balcony and sandstone columns of the Church Street facade were added. A number of notable persons worked and patronized the Planter's Hotel including the noted 19th Century actor Junius Brutus Booth (father of actors Edwin and John Wilkes Booth). African-American Civil War naval hero and U.S. Congressman Robert Smalls, who stole a steamboat in the harbor and sailed it out past the Confederate held Fort Sumter and turned it over to the blockading Union Fleet, served as a waiter in the hotel's dining room before the war. Charleston's famed Planter's Punch was first introduced here.

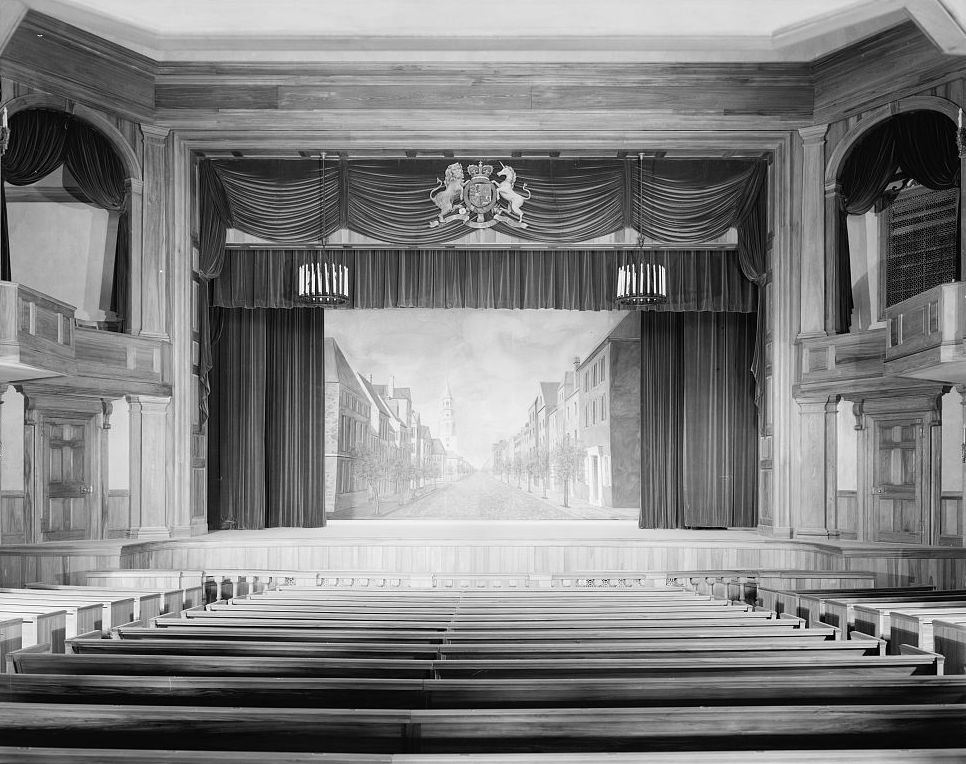
Stage and seats

=== 1935 Renovations ===
After the Civil War, the Planter's Hotel fell into disrepair and was slated for demolition. However, in 1935, at the height of the Great Depression, after Milton Pearlstine made the property available to the City of Charleston and at the urging of Mayor Burnet Maybank and other notable citizens, the original building became a Works Progress Administration project. At that time, the present theatre was constructed within the shell of the Planter's Hotel. The hotel's grand foyer became the grand foyer of the theatre, and the hotel's dining room now serves as the box-office lobby. Douglas Ellington served as the architectural advisor for the project; Charleston architects Simons & Lapham then supervised the daily work while Ellington was in Washington, D.C. The woodwork and mantels of the second floor drawing room were salvaged from the Radcliffe-King Mansion (circa 1799), which stood at the corner of George and Meeting streets and was razed to build the College of Charleston gymnasium, another WPA project. Modeled on 18th century London playhouses by Charleston architect and pioneering preservationist Albert Simons, the present Dock Street Theatre's stage house and auditorium were built in the hotel's courtyard. The local carpenters, who were put to work as a part of this Depression-era relief effort, used locally grown and milled native black cypress for the wooden interior. Following this $350,000 renovation, The Historic Dock Street Theatre's second grand opening took place on November 26, 1937. Notables in the audience included author DuBose Heyward (Porgy), who was named writer-in-residence.

=== 2010 Renovations ===
The Historic Dock Street Theatre reopened for the third time on March 18, 2010 after a three-year, $19 million renovation by the City of Charleston. This extensive full-scale renovation brought the historic theatre into the 21st century with state-of-the-art lighting and sound, modern heating and air conditioning, and new restrooms and seating. In addition the theatre was made seismically secure and fully handicapped accessible. Extensive sound-proofing was added to ensure that outside noises no longer intruded on performances inside.

Now owned and managed by the City of Charleston, The Historic Dock Street Theatre is home to many of the City's cultural institutions including Spoleto Festival USA. Charleston Stage, which became the resident professional theatre at the Dock Street Theatre in 1978, produces over 120 performances each season and plays to more than 40,000 patrons annually. In addition more than 15,000 South Carolina students enjoy special school day performances offered by Charleston Stage each year at the Historic Dock Street Theatre.

== See also ==
- Charleston Theatre
