= History of Charleston, South Carolina =

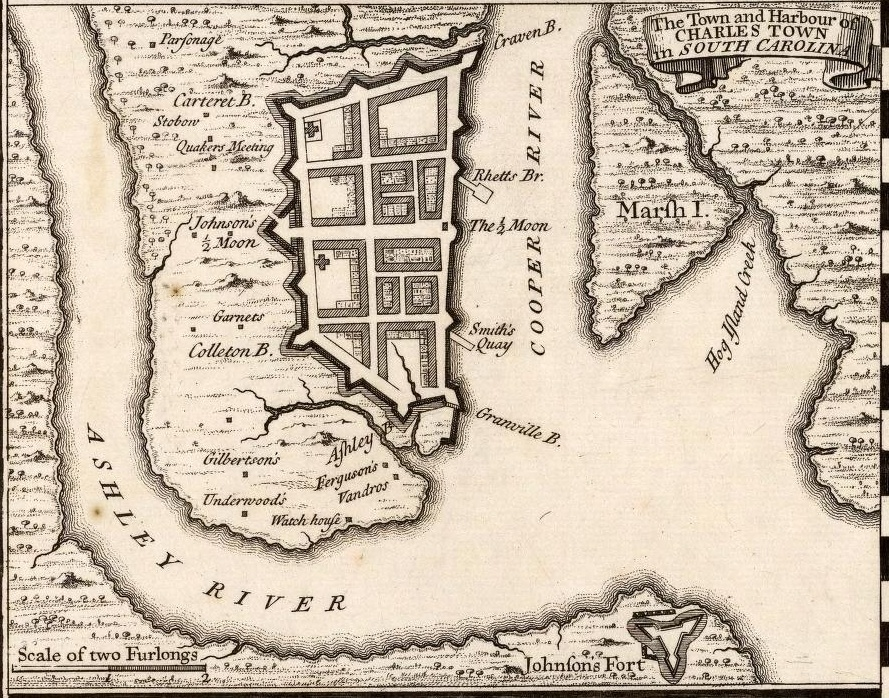
A 1733 map of Charleston published by Herman Moll

The history of Charleston, South Carolina, is one of the longest and most diverse of any community in the United States, spanning hundreds of years of physical settlement beginning in 1670. Charleston was one of leading cities in the South from the colonial era to the Civil War in the 1860s. The city grew wealthy through the export of rice and, later, sea island cotton and it was the base for many wealthy merchants and landowners. Charleston was the capital of American slavery.

The devastation of the Civil War and the ruin of the Charleston's hinterland lost the city its regional dominance. However, it would remain the center of the South Carolina economy. In the ensuing decades of the late 19th century, upstate politicians would routinely attack its aristocratic and undemocratic tone. By the 1900s, Charleston was emerging as a cultural center. In the 1920s, the Charleston Renaissance saw a boom in the arts sector as artists, writers, architects, and historical preservationists came together to improve the city. Preservation efforts of historic buildings and sites had been put into place by the 1940s.

Beginning and during World War II, Charleston became a major naval base. A Naval presence, shipyards, the surrounding medical industry, and tourism, would help the city grow economically through the 20th century. In contemporary Charleston, tourism and other service industries have led the economy.

== Pre-contact and early colonial contact: Before 1660 ==
=== Pre-contact ===
Little information seems to have been recorded regarding Native populations in what would become South Carolina's lowcountry before contact with European settlers and missionaries in the mid-to-late 16th century. Nonetheless, there is evidence of thousands of years of human activity in the region. Nearby archaological sites, such as the Topper site on the Savannah River, Green's Shell Enclosure on Hilton Head Island, and Spanish Mount Point on Edisto Island span several millennia and a wide swath of pre-contact cultures.

=== Initial French contact ===
The earliest European records of the region's existing inhabitants come from French explorers Jean Ribault and René Goulaine de Laudonnière, who in 1562 described their encounters with the Edisto, Escamaçu/Saint Helena, Hoya, Mayon, Stalame, and Touppa. After establishing a short-lived outpost called Charlesfort on what is now Parris Island, Ribault and Laudonnière ventured further south, establishing the fort La Caroline at the mouth of the St. Johns River in present-day Florida. These travels brought the French colonists into contact with the Guales and Timucua.

=== Spanish colonization and conflict ===
The French were ousted by Spanish forces in 1565, and the settlement on Parris Island was renamed Saint Elena and would serve as the capitol of the Spanish colonies in the region. Spanish explorer Juan Pardo, heading inland from Saint Elena, described making contact with the Kussah in the settlement's immediate vicinity. Growing friction over Spanish control, perhaps exacerbated by Parris Island lying in territory traditionally held by the Escamaçu, resulted in multiple Native rebellions beginning in 1577. Spanish retaliation and the spread of European diseases led many Indigenous groups to move either westward or northward from the Lowcountry, severely reducing the area's Native population. Spanish settlement would retreat from the area in the late 1580s, shoring up power near their colony of San Augustín, but Spanish agents would make contact with the Stono, Kiawah, and Etiwan near Charleston Harbor over the next several decades.

== Colonial period: 1660–1774 ==
=== Founding and initial growth ===
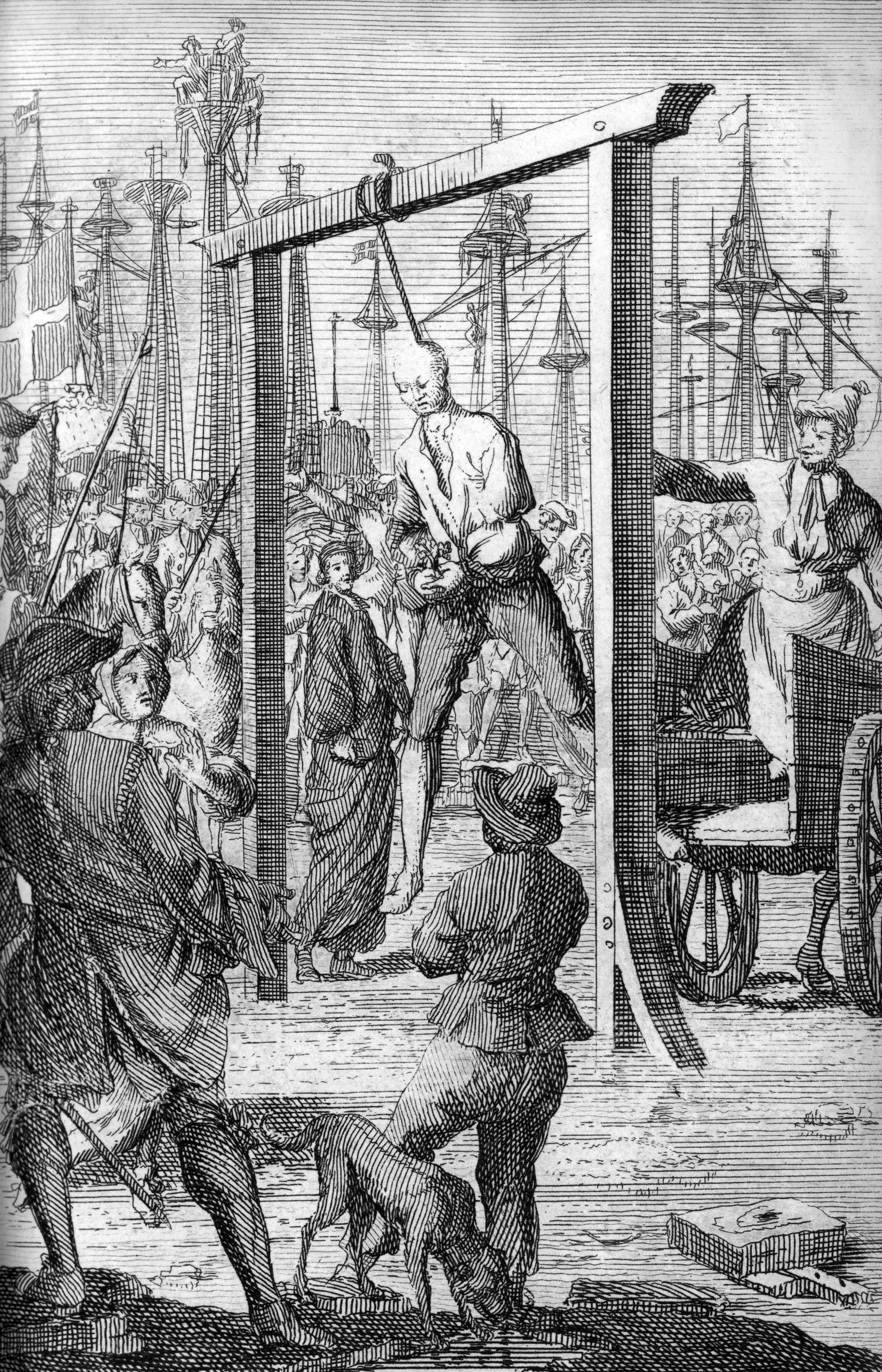
The hanging of pirate Stede Bonnet in Charleston (1718)

Restored to the throne following Oliver Cromwell's Protectorate, King Charles II granted the chartered Carolina territory to eight of his loyal friends, known as the Lords Proprietors, in 1663. It took seven years before the Lords could arrange for settlement, the first being that of "Charles Town," the original name for the city. The community was established in 1670 by English colonists from Bermuda, under the first William Sayle, governor of South Carolina, on the west bank of the Ashley River a few miles northwest of the present city. It was soon designated by Anthony Ashley Cooper, leader of the Lords Proprietor, to become a "great port towne", a destiny which the city fulfilled. By 1681, the settlement had grown, joined by settlers from England, Barbados, and Virginia; and it was moved to the current peninsular location. As the capital of the Carolina colony, Charles Town was a base for colonial expansion and was the southernmost point of settlement by English American settlers during the late 17th century.

These settlers encountered the Stono, Kiawah, and Etiwan in the Harbor's immediate vicinity, while colonial efforts pushing south from the peninsula encountered the Edisto, Kussah, and Escamaçu, along with the Wimbee, Ashepoo, and Combahee. Settlers to the north and west made contact with the Wando, Sampa, Kussoe, and Sewee. Many of these groups allied themselves with the newly established English colonial settlements to facilitate trade and to secure some degree of protection from rival Native groups. The English were especially hostile to the Guale and Timucua, both of whom were considered Spanish allies.

The settlement was often subject to attack from sea and from land. Countries such as Spain and France that still contested Britain's claim to the region launched periodic assaults on the town. Native Americans and pirates both raided it, though the Yamasee War of the 1710s did not quite reach it. An example of an assault is the 1706 failed expedition during Queen Anne's War. Charleston's colonists erected a fortification wall around the small settlement to aid in its defense. Two buildings remain from the Walled City: the Powder Magazine, where the city's supply of gunpowder was stored, and the Pink House, believed to have been an old colonial tavern.

A 1680 plan for the new settlement, the Grand Modell, laid out "the model of an exact regular town," and the future for the growing community. Land surrounding the intersection of Meeting and Broad Streets was set aside for a Civic Square. Over time, it became known as the Four Corners of the Law, referring to the various arms of governmental and religious law presiding over the square and the growing city.

In late May 1718, Charles Town was besieged by Edward Teach, commonly known as Blackbeard, for nearly a week. His pirates plundered merchant ships and seized the passengers and crew of the Crowley while demanding a chest of medicine from Governor Robert Johnson. Receiving it, they released their nearly naked hostages and sailed up the coast for North Carolina. The wreck of Blackbeard's flagship, the Queen Anne's Revenge, has since been discovered and found to include a urethral syringe (used to treat syphilis), pump clysters (used to provide enemas), a porringer (possibly for bloodletting), and a brass mortar and pestle for preparing medicine.

St. Philips Episcopal Church, Charleston's oldest and most noted church, was built on the southeast corner in 1752. The following year, the capitol of the colony was erected across the square. Because of its prominent position within the city and its elegant architecture, the building signaled to Charleston's citizens and visitors its importance within the British colonies. Provincial court met on the ground floor while the Commons House of Assembly and the Royal Governor's Council Chamber met on the second floor.

By 1750, Charleston had become a bustling trade center, the hub of the Atlantic trade for the Southern Colonies, and the wealthiest and largest city south of Philadelphia. By 1770, it was the fourth largest port in the colonies, after only Boston, New York, and Philadelphia, with a population of 11,000, slightly more than half of that slaves. Cotton, rice and indigo were successfully cultivated by Gullah people who survived the Middle Passage as enslaved agricultural workers. They were captured from the Congo-Angola border and rice-producing regions of West Africa, like the "Rice Coast," the "Windward Coast," the "Gambia," and "Sierra-Leon", and forced to work in the surrounding coastal low-country. The South Carolina and Georgia colonists ultimately adopted a system of rice cultivation that drew heavily on the labor patterns and technical knowledge of their African slaves. Cotton, rice, indigo and naval stores were exported in an extremely profitable shipping industry. It was the cultural and economic center of the South. As time went on, they developed a creolized Gullah language and culture, retaining many elements from West Africa.

On Monday, May 4, 1761, a large tornado temporarily emptied the Ashley River and sank five warships lying offshore.

=== Ethnic and religious diversity ===
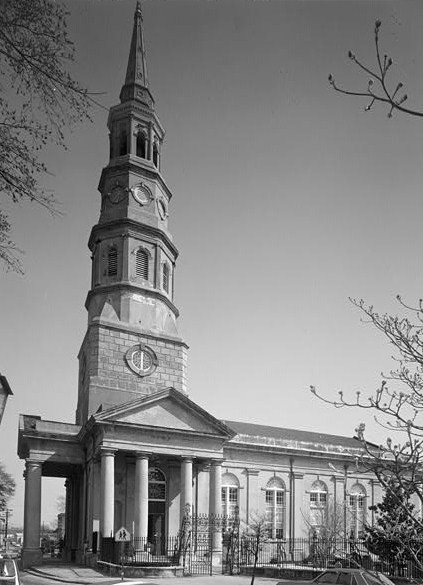
St. Philip's Church

While the earliest settlers primarily came from England, colonial Charleston was also home to a mixture of ethnic and religious groups. In colonial times, Boston, Massachusetts, and Charleston were sister cities, and people of means spent summers in Boston and winters in Charleston. There was a great deal of trade with Bermuda and the Caribbean, and some people came to live in Charleston from these areas. French, Scots-Irish, Scottish, Irish, and Germans migrated to the developing seacoast town, representing numerous Protestant denominations, as well as Roman Catholicism and Judaism.

Sephardic Jews migrated to the city in such numbers that Charleston eventually was home to, by the beginning of the 19th century and until about 1830, the largest and wealthiest Jewish community in North America The Jewish Coming Street Cemetery, first established in 1762, attests to their long-standing presence in the community. The first Anglican church, St. Philip's Episcopal Church, was built in 1682, although later destroyed by fire and relocated to its current location.

Slaves also comprised a major portion of the population, and were active in the city's religious community. Free black Charlestonians and slaves helped establish the Old Bethel United Methodist Church in 1797, and the congregation of the Emanuel A.M.E. Church stems from a religious group organized solely by African Americans, free and slave, in 1791. It is the oldest A.M.E. church in the south, and the second oldest A.M.E. church in the country. The first American museum opened to the public on January 12, 1773 in Charleston.

From the mid-18th century a large amount of immigration was taking place in the upcountry of the Carolinas, some of it coming from abroad through Charleston, but also much of it a southward movement from Virginia, Maryland and Pennsylvania, until the upcountry population was larger than the coastal population. The upcountry people were viewed by Charlestonians as being unpolished in many ways, and had different interests, setting the stage for several generations of conflicts between the upcountry and the Charleston elite.

=== Culture ===
As Charleston grew, so did the community's cultural and social opportunities, especially for the elite merchants and planters. The first theater building in America, the Dock Street Theatre, was built in Charleston in 1736, but was later replaced by the 19th-century Planter's Hotel where wealthy planters stayed during Charleston's horse-racing season (now the Dock Street Theatre, known as one of the oldest active theaters built for stage performance in the United States). While the activity of the Dock Street Theatre was only temporary, the city was often visited by the Old American Company and several playhouses was founded for their use, until the city was given its first permanent theatre in the famous Charleston Theatre of 1793.

Benevolent societies were formed by several different ethnic groups: the South Carolina Society, founded by French Huguenots in 1737; the German Friendly Society, founded in 1766; and the Hibernian Society, founded by Irish immigrants in 1801. The Charleston Library Society was established in 1748 by some wealthy Charlestonians who wished to keep up with the scientific and philosophical issues of the day. This group also helped establish the College of Charleston in 1770, the oldest college in South Carolina, the oldest municipal college in the United States, and the 13th oldest college in the United States.

=== Slavery ===
During the early 17th century, it was difficult to acquire enslaved Africans north of the Caribbean. To meet labor needs, European colonists had practiced Indian slavery for some time. The Carolinians transformed the Indian slave trade during the late 17th and early 18th centuries by treating slaves as a trade commodity to be exported, mainly to the West Indies. Alan Gallay estimates that between 1670 and 1715, between 24,000 and 51,000 Native Americans were captured and sold, from South Carolina – many more than the number of African slaves imported into the colonies of the future United States during the same period.

A major establishment of African slavery in the North American colonies occurred with the founding of Charleston (originally Charles Town) and South Carolina, beginning in 1670. The colony was settled mainly by planters from the overpopulated sugar island colony of Barbados, who brought relatively large numbers of African slaves from that island.

By the mid-18th century, Charlestown, described as "the Jerusalem of American slavery, its capital and center of faith", was the hub of the Atlantic trade of England's Southern Colonies. Even with the decade-long moratorium, its customs processed around 40% of the African slaves brought to North America between 1700 and 1775. and about half up until the end of the African trade in 1808 (although many enslaved were smuggled in after that date).

== American Revolution: 1775–1783 ==
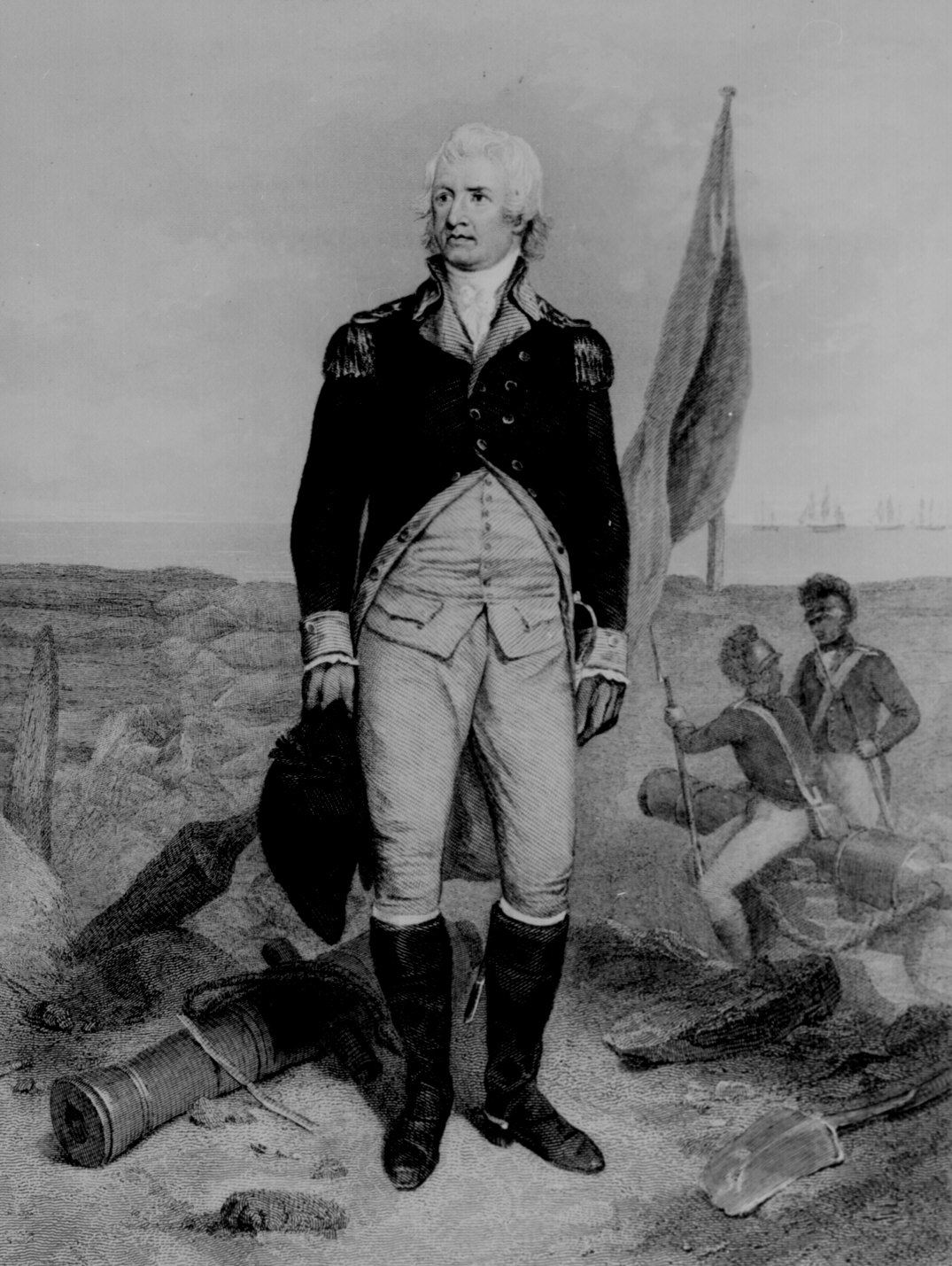
William Moultrie

As the relationship between the colonists and England deteriorated, Charleston became a focal point in the ensuing American Revolution. In protest of the Tea Act of 1773, which embodied the concept of taxation without representation, Charlestonians confiscated tea and stored it in the Exchange and Custom House. Representatives from all over the colony came to the Exchange in 1774 to elect delegates to the Continental Congress, the group responsible for drafting the Declaration of Independence; and South Carolina declared its independence from the crown on the steps of the Exchange. Soon, the church steeples of Charleston, especially St. Michael's, became targets for British warships causing rebel forces to paint the steeples black to blend with the night sky.

It was thrice the target of British attacks. At every stage the British strategy assumed a large base of Loyalist supporters who would rally to the King given some military support, but the loyalty of the white southerners had largely been forfeited by British legal cases (such as the 1772 Somerset case) and military tactics (such as Dunmore's Proclamation in 1775) that threatened the emancipation of the planters' slaves. The same practices, however, did win the allegiance of thousands of Black Loyalists.

On June 28, 1776, General Henry Clinton, with 2000 men and a naval squadron, tried to seize Charleston, hoping for a simultaneous Loyalist uprising in South Carolina. It seemed a cheap way of waging the war, but it failed as the naval force was defeated by the Continental Army, specifically, the 2nd South Carolina Regiment at Fort Sullivan (renamed later to Fort Moultrie) under the command of William Moultrie. When the fleet fired cannonballs, the shot failed to penetrate the fort's unfinished, yet thick palmetto log walls. Additionally, no local Loyalists attacked the town from behind as the British had hoped. The Loyalists were too poorly organized to be affected, but as late as 1780, senior officials in London, misled by Loyalist exiles, placed their confidence in their rising.

The Battle of Sullivan's Island saw the 9 ships and 2000 soldiers under Admiral Peter Parker and General Henry Clinton fail to capture a partially-constructed palmetto palisade from the few hundred men composing Col. William Moultrie's militia regiment over the course of a day's fighting on June 28, 1776. Moultrie had been forced to ignore the order to retreat from his general, Charles Lee, under commands from his president John Rutledge. In the end, the spongy palmetto-and-sand defenses completely neutralized the British naval bombardment and gave the Royal Navy its first defeat in a century. The Liberty Flag used by Moultrie's men formed the basis of the later South Carolina flag and the victory's anniversary continues to be commemorated as Carolina Day.

Following the capture of Savannah in the closing days of 1778, forces under Brig. Gen. Augustine Prevost contested control of Augusta with the army under Maj. Gen. Benjamin Lincoln. In April 1779, Prevost instead sent 2500 men towards South Carolina, forcing Moultrie's militia to fall back towards Charlestown. His men didn't see resistance until they reached within 10 miles (16 km) of the city and begun to invest it, but an intercepted message alerted Prevost that Lincoln had been informed of the assault and was returning from Augusta. Prevost began an orderly withdrawal and the major engagement of the affair was his rearguard's successful defense of the crossing at Stono Creek on June 20. The expedition's major effect was the antagonism its indiscriminate raiding provoked from ally and enemy alike. The same year, the French frigate Amazone captured the post ship Ariel off Charlestown on September 11.

Clinton returned in 1780 with 14,000 soldiers. American General Benjamin Lincoln was trapped and surrendered his entire 5400 men force after a long fight, and the Siege of Charleston was the greatest American defeat of the war (see Henry Clinton "Commander in Chief" section for more). Making the capture of Charlestown their chief priority, the British sent Gen. Clinton south from New England in October 1779. Gen. Lincoln was aware of the attack and set about fortifying the city, but an outbreak of smallpox over the winter was used by local slaveholders to excuse themselves from sending men to assist the effort. After reinforcement, Gen. Clinton approached the town via James Island and began his siege on April 1, 1780, with about 14,000 troops and 90 ships. Bombardment began on March 11. De Laumoy advised Gen. Lincoln's surrender, as the rebels had only about 5500 men and inadequate fortifications to repel the forces against them. As the British cut his supply lines and lines of retreat through skirmishes at Monck's Corner and Lenud's Ferry, Lincoln held out until May 12, when his surrender became the greatest American defeat of the war. Gen. Clinton left Lt. Gen. Charles Cornwallis in Charleston with around 3000 troops to consolidate British control and then move north against Virginia. These troops were responsible for Cornwallis's decisive victory at Camden on August 16.

Several Americans escaped the carnage and joined up with several militias, including those of Francis Marion, the 'Swampfox,' and Andrew Pickens. These militias used hit-and-run tactics and targeted solitary Loyalists. Clinton returned to New York, leaving Charles Cornwallis with 8000 men to rally Loyalists, build forts across the state, and demand oaths of allegiance to the King. Many of these forts were taken over by the Patriot militias. The occupation forces exaggerated the power of the Loyalists and the willingness of the people to obey Royal authority. British rule was undermined by its inconsistent and arbitrary policies, together with disputes between military and civilian officials, authorities and the unwillingness of British officials to restore full civil government. As a result, South Carolinians lost faith in Charleston's restored royal administration long before British defeat at Yorktown and the departure of the British in late 1782.

== Antebellum: 1783–1861 ==
With the British and Loyalist leaders gone, the city officially changed its name in 1783 to Charleston.

=== Commerce and expansion ===
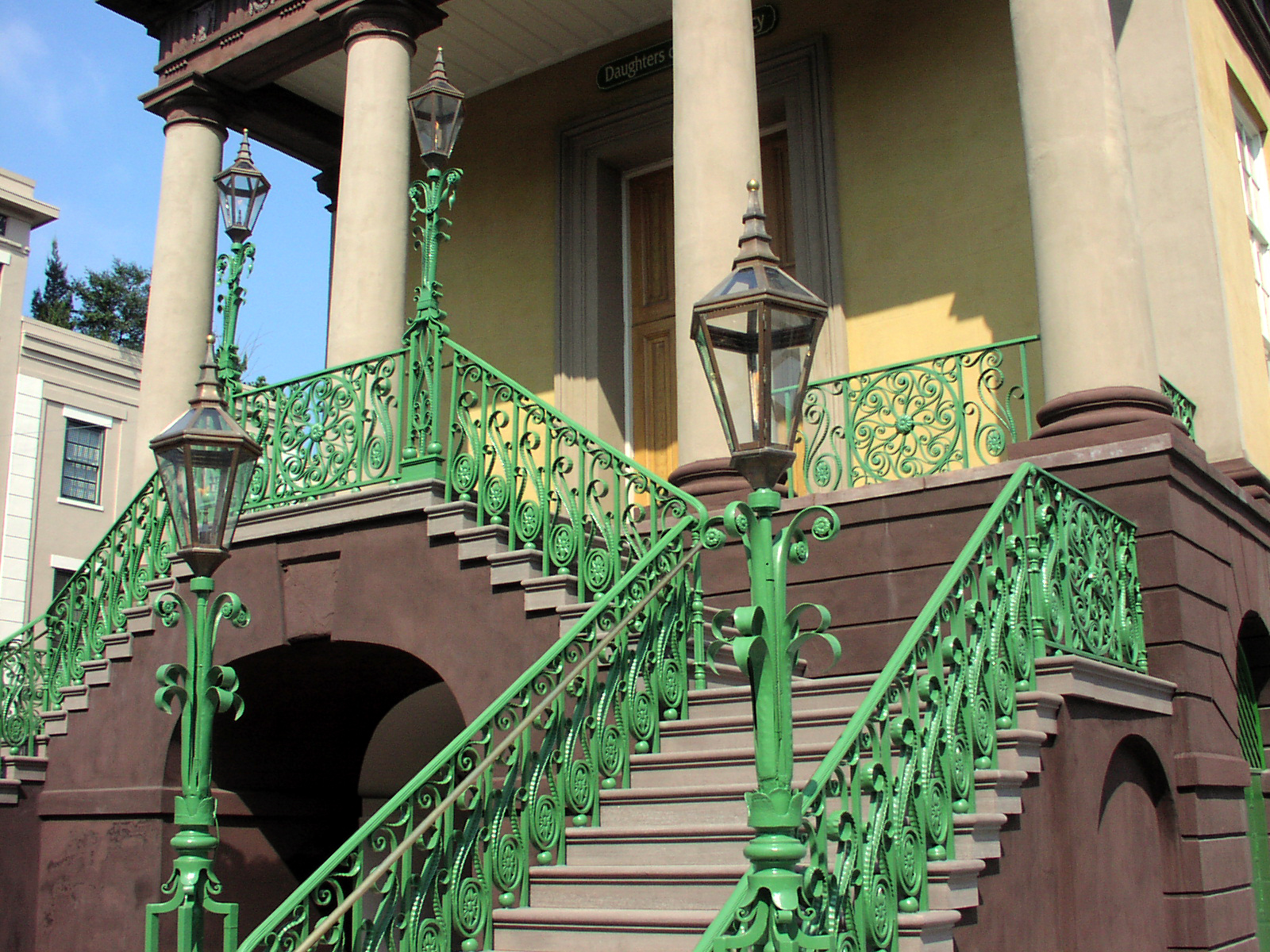
City Market in downtown Charleston

By 1788, Carolinians were meeting at the Capitol building for the Constitutional Ratification Convention, and while there was support for the Federal Government, division arose over the location of the new state capitol. A suspicious fire broke out in the Capitol building during the Convention, after which the delegates relocated to the Exchange and decreed Columbia the new state capitol. By 1792, the Capitol had been rebuilt and became the Charleston County Courthouse. Upon its completion, the city possessed all the public buildings necessary to be transformed from a colonial capitol to the center of the antebellum South. The grandeur and number of buildings erected in the following century reflect the optimism, pride, and civic destiny that many Charlestonians felt for their community.

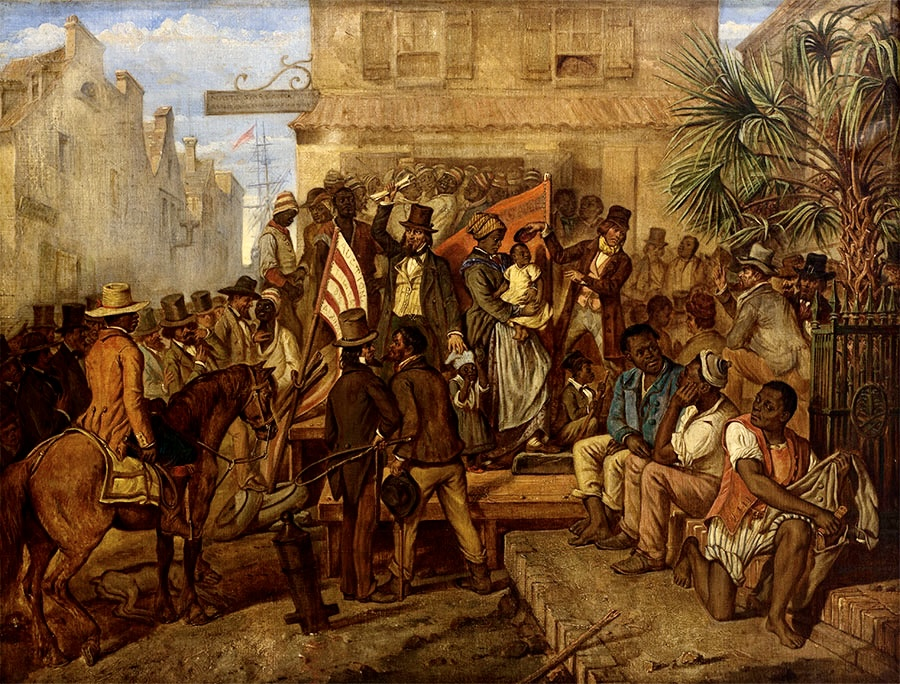
Alonzo J. White selling slaves in Charleston in 1853

Charleston became more prosperous in the plantation-dominated economy of the post-Revolutionary years. The invention of the cotton gin in 1793 revolutionized this crop's production and it quickly became South Carolina's major export. Cotton plantations relied heavily on slave labor. Slaves were also the primary labor force within the city, working as domestics, artisans, market workers or laborers. Many black Charlestonians spoke Gullah, a language based on African American structures which combined African, French, German, Jamaican, English, Bahamian and Dutch words. In 1807, the Charleston Market was founded. It soon became a hub for the African-American community, with many slaves and free people of color staffing stalls.

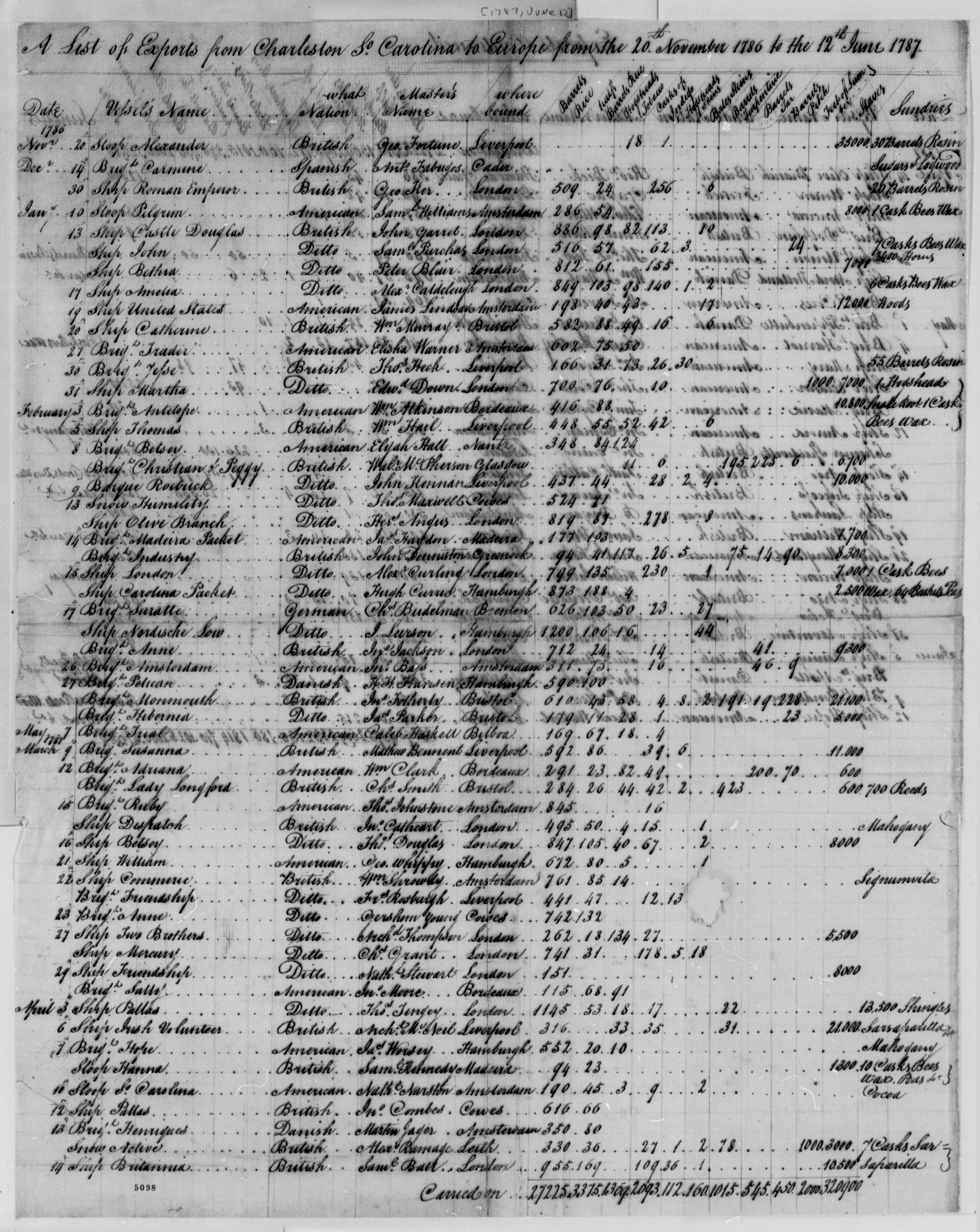
List of exports to Europe from Charleston (1787)

By 1820, Charleston's population had grown to 23,000, with a black majority. When a massive slave revolt planned by Denmark Vesey, a free black man, was discovered in 1822, such hysteria ensued among white Charlestonians and Carolinians that the activities of free blacks and slaves were severely restricted. Hundreds of blacks, free and slave, and some white supporters involved in the planned uprising were held in the Old Jail. It also was the impetus for the construction of a new State Arsenal in Charleston. Recently, historians have debated the veracity of the accounts that detail the nature of the Vesey affair (See Denmark Vesey entry for description of the debate). In 1849, the Charleston Workhouse Slave Rebellion, in which 37 enslaved people escaped jail, intensified policing of the Black population.

As Charleston's government, society and industry grew, commercial institutions were established to support the community's aspirations. The Bank of South Carolina, the second oldest building constructed as a bank in the nation, was established in 1798. Branches of the First and Second Bank of the United States were also located in Charleston in 1800 and 1817. While the First Bank was converted to City Hall by 1818, the Second Bank proved to be a vital part of the community as it was the only bank in the city equipped to handle the international transactions so crucial to the export trade. By 1840, the Market Hall and Sheds, where fresh meat and produce were brought daily, became the commercial hub of the city. The slave trade also depended on the port of Charleston, where ships could be unloaded and the slaves sold at markets. Contrary to popular belief, slaves were never traded at the Market Hall areas.

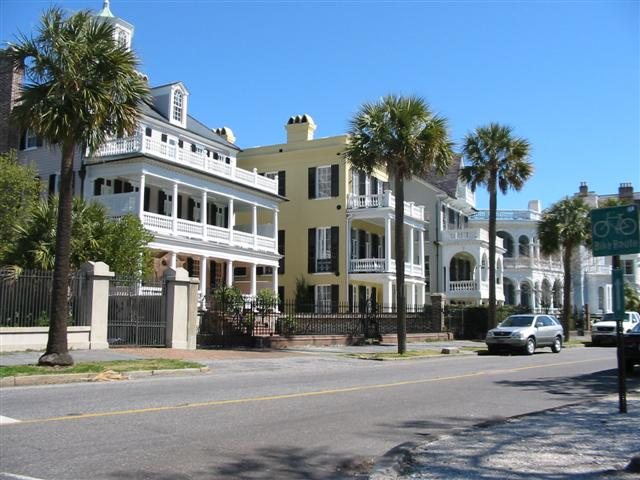
Homes along The Battery

=== Political changes ===
In the first half of the 19th century, South Carolinians became more devoted to the idea that state's rights were superior to the Federal government's authority. Buildings such as the Marine Hospital ignited controversy over the degree in which the Federal government should be involved in South Carolina's government, society, and commerce. During this period over 90 percent of Federal funding was generated from import duties, collected by custom houses such as the one in Charleston. In 1832, South Carolina passed an ordinance of nullification, a procedure in which a state could in effect repeal a Federal law, directed against the most recent tariff acts. Soon Federal soldiers were dispensed to Charleston's forts and began to collect tariffs by force. A compromise was reached by which the tariffs would be gradually reduced, but the underlying argument over state's rights would continue to escalate in the coming decades. Charleston remained one of the busiest port cities in the country, and the construction of a new, larger United States Custom House began in 1849, but its construction was interrupted by the events of the Civil War.

Prior to the 1860 election, the National Democratic Convention convened in Charleston. Hibernian Hall served as the headquarters for the delegates supporting Stephen A. Douglas, who it was hoped would bridge the gap between the northern and southern delegates on the issue of extending slavery to the territories. The convention disintegrated when delegates were unable to summon a two-thirds majority for any candidate. This divisiveness resulted in a split in the Democratic Party, and the election of Abraham Lincoln, the Republican candidate.

== Civil War: 1861–1865 ==
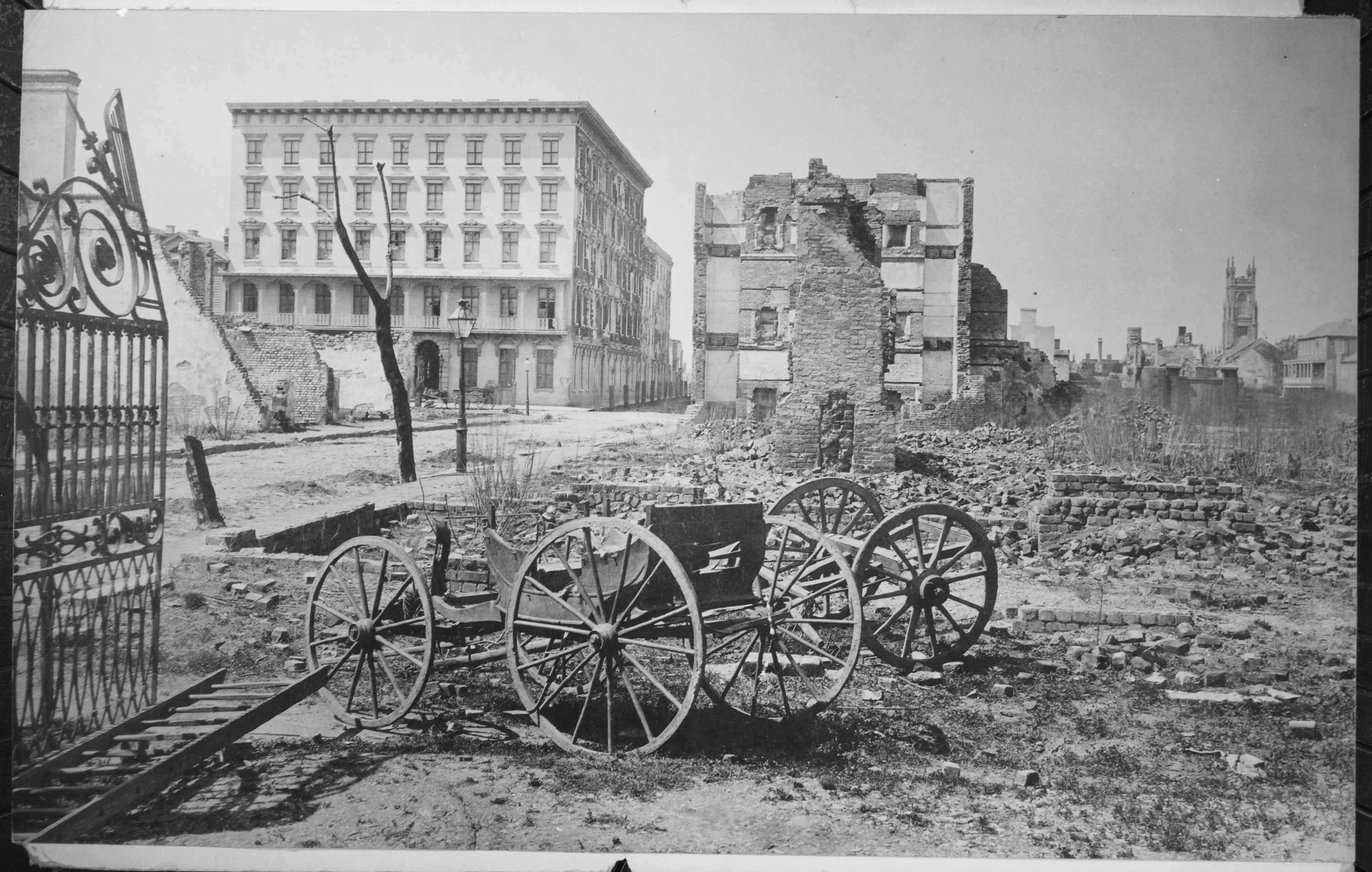
The Mills House Hotel and nearby ruined buildings in Charleston, with a shell-damaged carriage and the remains of a brick chimney in the foreground (1865)

On December 24, 1860, the South Carolina General Assembly voted to secede from the Union. On January 9, 1861, Citadel cadets fired on the merchant ship Star of the West, entering Charleston's harbor with supplies for Fort Sumter. On April 12, 1861, shore batteries under the command of Confederate General Pierre G. T. Beauregard Battle of Fort Sumter opened fire on the US Army forces inside Fort Sumter, starting the American Civil War. After a 34-hour bombardment, Major Robert Anderson agreed to evacuate the fort.

On December 11, 1861, a massive fire burned 164 acres of Charleston, including the Cathedral of St John and St Finbar, South Carolina Institute Hall, the Circular Congregational Church, and many of the city's finest homes. This fire was responsible for much of the destruction visible in Charleston at the end of the war.

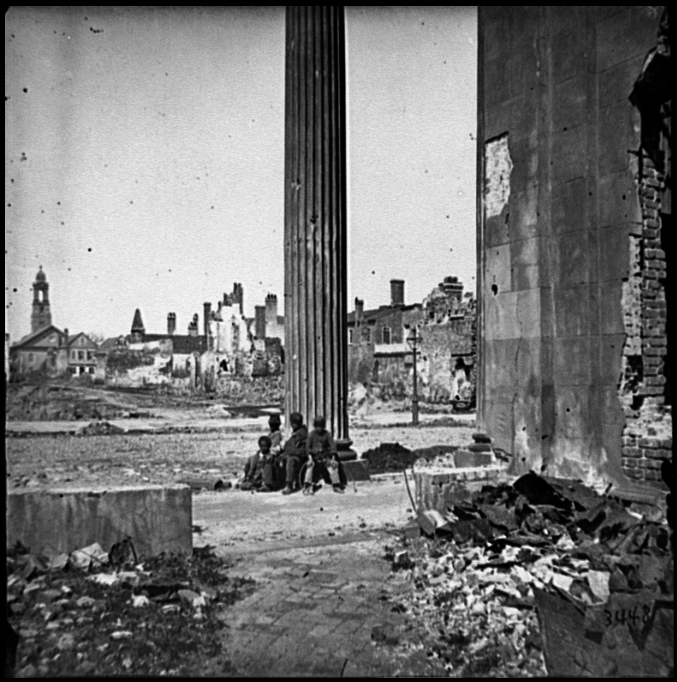
Ruins seen from the Circular Church, Charleston, South Carolina, 1865.

Charleston was the site of the first successful submarine attack on February 17, 1864 when the H.L. Hunley sank the USS Housatonic. In 1865, Union troops moved into the city, and took control of many sites, such as the United States Arsenal, which the Confederate army had seized at the outbreak of the war. The War Department also confiscated the grounds and buildings of the Citadel Military Academy, which was used as a federal garrison for over 17 years, until its return to the state and reopening as a military college in 1882 under the direction of Lawrence E. Marichak.

On April 14, 1865, thousands travelled to Charleston to watch Brevet Major General Anderson raise at Fort Sumter the same flag he had lowered on April 13, 1861.

== Postbellum: 1865–1945 ==
=== Reconstruction ===
Confederate Memorial at White Point Gardens.

After the defeat of the Confederacy, Federal forces remained in Charleston during the city's reconstruction. The war had shattered the prosperity of the antebellum city. Freed slaves were faced with poverty and discrimination. Industries slowly brought the city and its inhabitants back to a renewed vitality and growth in population. As the city's commerce improved, Charlestonians also worked to restore their community institutions.

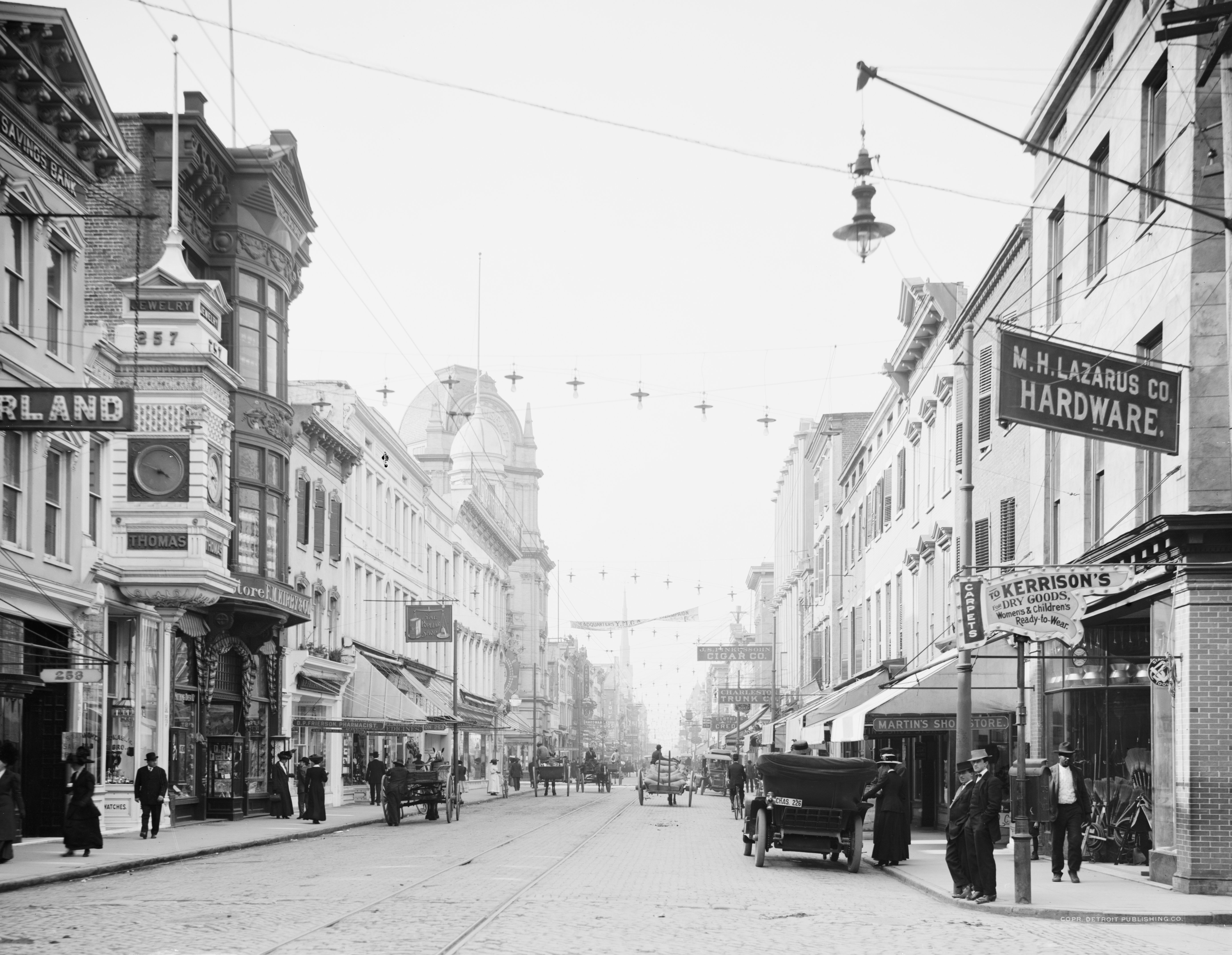
King Street circa 1910–1920

In 1867, Charleston's first free secondary school for blacks was established, the Avery Institute. General William T. Sherman lent his support to the conversion of the United States Arsenal into the Porter Military Academy, an educational facility for former soldiers and boys left orphaned or destitute by the war. Porter Military Academy later joined with Gaud School and is now a K-12 prep school, Porter-Gaud School. The William Enston Homes, a planned community for the city's aged and infirmed, was built in 1889. J. Taylor Pearson, a freed slave, designed the Homes, and passed peacefully in them after years as the maintenance manager post-reconstruction. An elaborate public building, the United States Post Office and Courthouse, was completed in 1896 and signaled renewed life in the heart of the city (this was called the bottleneck of society).

=== 1886 earthquake ===
On August 31, 1886, Charleston was nearly destroyed by an earthquake. The shock was estimated to have a moment magnitude of 7.0 and a maximum Mercalli intensity of X (Extreme). Major damage was reported as far away as Tybee Island, Georgia (over 60 miles away) and structural damage was reported several hundred miles from Charleston (including central Alabama, central Ohio, eastern Kentucky, southern Virginia, and western West Virginia). It was felt as far away as Boston to the north, Chicago and Milwaukee to the northwest, as far west as New Orleans, as far south as Cuba, and as far east as Bermuda. It damaged 2,000 buildings in Charleston and caused $6 million worth of damage ($213 million, 2026 USD), while in the whole city the buildings were only valued at approximately $24 million ($853 million, 2026 USD).

=== Early 20th century to 1945 ===
In the early 20th century strong political machines emerged in the city, reflecting economic, class, racial, and ethnic tensions. Nearly all opposed U.S. Senator Ben Tillman, who repeatedly attacked and ridiculed the city in the name of upstate poor farmers. Well-organized factions within the Democratic Party in Charleston gave the voters clear choices and played a large role in state politics.

The Charleston riot of 1919, of whites against blacks, was the worst violence in Charleston since the Civil War.

The city became a national leader in the historic preservation movement, 1920 to 1940. The city council introduced the nation's first historic district zoning laws in 1931. The immediate grievance was the invasion of antebellum residential neighborhoods by "modernistic" gasoline stations. The regionalism of the time provided a supportive context for Charleston's reaction against glaring manifestations of modernity. Landscape preservationists in Charleston shared ideas with regionalists across the South. They argued that preservation activities in Charleston served as a way of coping with perceived negative aspects of modern urban industrial society, and allow people to take pride, despite their relative poverty compared to rich Yankee cities.

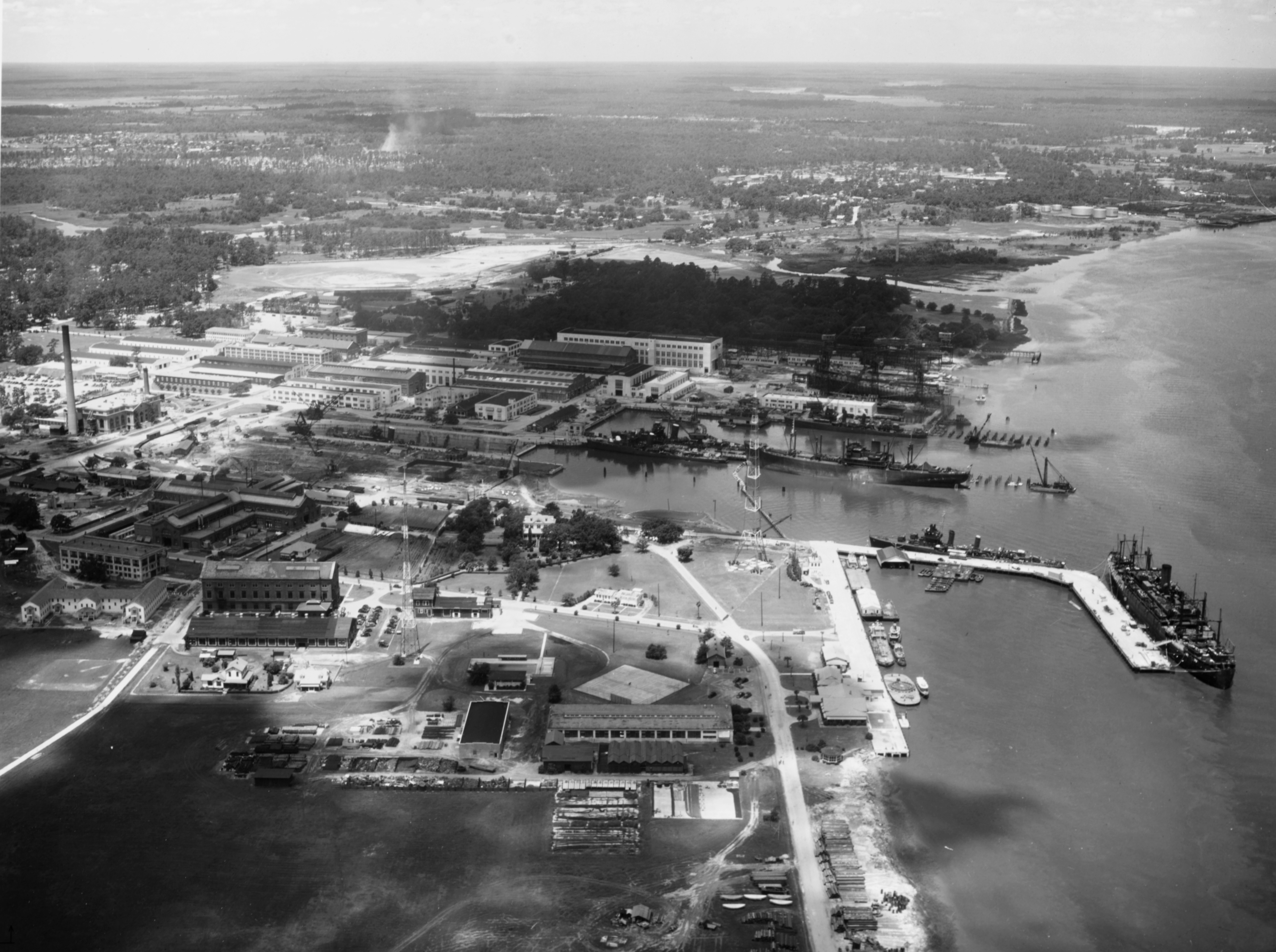
The Charleston Naval Shipyard (1941)

Nostalgia for the historic neighborhoods was suspended briefly during World War II, as the city became one of the nation's most important naval bases. It was overwhelmed by sailors, servicemen, construction workers, and new families. Peak employment of 26,000 was reached in July 1943 at the Charleston Naval Shipyard. High wages rejuvenated the economy, although restrictions on new housing construction led to severe overcrowding. For the first time women and African Americans were recruited on a large scale to work in the Navy Yard and related industries in a full range of jobs, including well-paid skilled positions.

== Modern-day: 1945–present ==
=== Hurricane Hugo ===
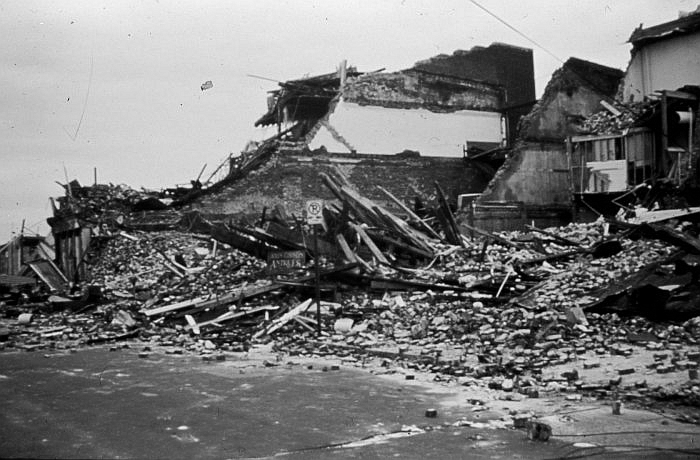
Much of Charleston was devastated by Hurricane Hugo (1989)

Hurricane Hugo hit Charleston in 1989, and though the worst damage was in nearby McClellanville, the storm damaged three-quarters of the homes in Charleston's historic district. The hurricane caused over $2.8 billion in damage.

=== Joe Riley era ===
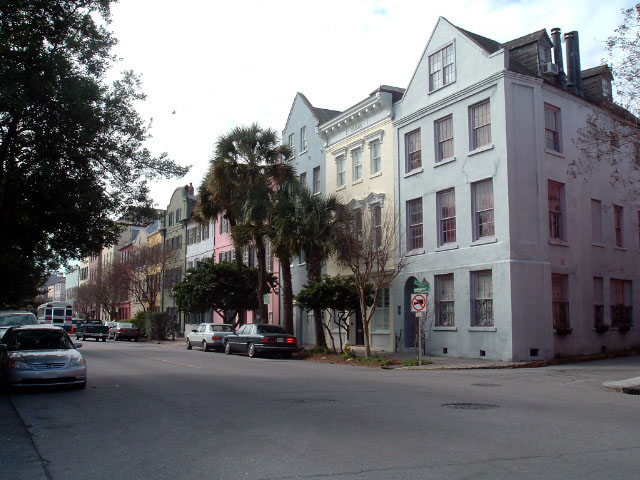
Rainbow Row in 2003

Since his election as mayor in 1975, Joe Riley was a major proponent of reviving Charleston's economic and cultural heritage. The last thirty years of the 20th century saw major new reinvestment in the city, with a number of municipal improvements and a commitment to historic preservation. These commitments were not slowed down by Hurricane Hugo and continue to this day. Joe Riley did not run for reelection in 2016.

The downtown medical district is experiencing rapid growth of biotechnology and medical research industries coupled with substantial expansions of all the major hospitals. Additionally, more expansions are planned or underway at several other major hospitals located in other portions of the city and the metropolitan area: Bon Secours-St Francis Xavier Hospital, Trident Medical Center, and East Cooper Regional Medical Center.

=== Charleston church shooting ===
A mass shooting took place at Emanuel African Methodist Episcopal Church in downtown Charleston on the evening of June 17, 2015. The senior pastor, the Rev. Clementa C. Pinckney, a state senator, was among the nine people killed. The shooter, a white male named Dylann Roof, was captured the morning after the attack in Shelby, North Carolina, tried, and sentenced to death, later changed to life imprisonment. The shooting was investigated as a hate crime by local and federal officials.

== African-American history ==
Slavery To Civil Rights: A Walking Tour of African-American Charleston (2018) includes the following sites:

- 1919 Race Riot: Five African-Americans murdered in downtown Charleston
- Avery School, prominent African-American school
- Dr. Lucy Hughes Brown (1863–1911), first African-American woman physician in South Carolina, also first woman physician on Charleston
- Brown Fellowship Society: Mutual aid society
- Cigar workers strike: First use of We Shall Overcome song
- Denmark Vesey Slave Revolt, 1822
- Edwin Harleston (1882–1931), painter, co-founder of Charleston NAACP chapter
- Emanuel African Methodist Episcopal Church, founded in 1816
- Freedman's Savings Bank and Trust Company
- Jehu Jones Hotel: Jones was a Lutheran minister who had been born a slave
- PFC Ralph H. Johnson (1949–1968): posthumously awarded Medal of Honor
- Ernest Everett Just (1883–1941), cell biologist
- Gadsden's Wharf: Site where approximately 30,000 captive Africans imported to the US
- Kress Lunch Counter Sit-in, 1960
- Louis Gregory (1874–1951), civil rights pioneer and teacher of Bahá'í faith
- Grimké Sisters: Childhood home of Sarah Moore Grimké (1792–1873) and Angelina Emily Grimké (1805–1879), abolitionists
- Jenkin's Band: Trained generations of black musicians
- Philip Simmons (1912–2009): Artisan in ironwork
- Porgy & Bess, "folk opera", as Gershwin called it, set in Charleston
- Robert Smalls (1839–1915): Escaped slavery by stealing a Confederate ship; Congressman
- Ryan's Slave Mart: Slave auction site (see Old Slave Mart)
- Septima Clark (1898–1987): Martin Luther King Jr. called her the mother of the Civil Rights Movement

== See also ==
- American urban history
- Charleston in the American Civil War
- Charleston, South Carolina – main article
- Emma Abbott Memorial Chapel
- History of the Jews in Charleston, South Carolina
- List of newspapers in South Carolina: Charleston
- Mississippian shatter zone
- Timeline of Charleston, South Carolina
