= Kiawah people =

Indigenous people from South Carolina

Kiawah
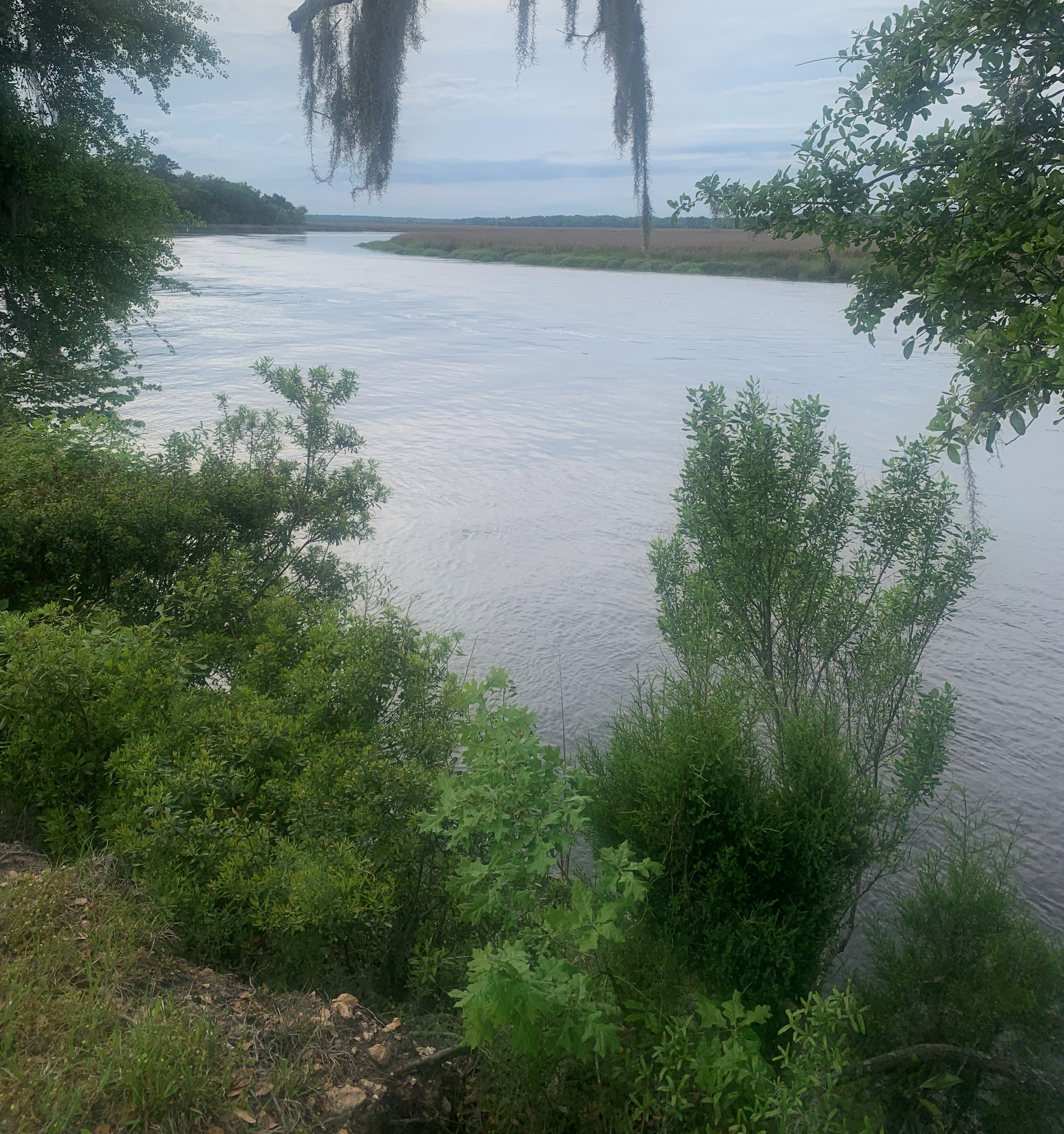
- Ashley River, where Kiawah settled

Regions with significant populations
- South Carolina Lowcountry

Languages
- likely Cusabo language, unattested

Religion
- Indigenous religion

Related ethnic groups
- other Cusabo tribes

The Kiawah were a tribe of Cusabo people, an alliance of Indigenous groups in lowland regions of the coastal region by Charleston, South Carolina.

When English colonists arrived and settled on the Ashley River, the Kiawah were friendly.

The Kiawah and the Etiwan tribe were the two principal Cusabo tribes close to the Charleston Harbor. While some other South Carolinian lowland tribes were not consistently associated with the Cusabo, the Kiawah were consistently a part of the Cusabo. The first record of Kiawah Cusabo alliance membership was in a 1707 agreement, in which the Kiawah were mentioned.

== Territory ==
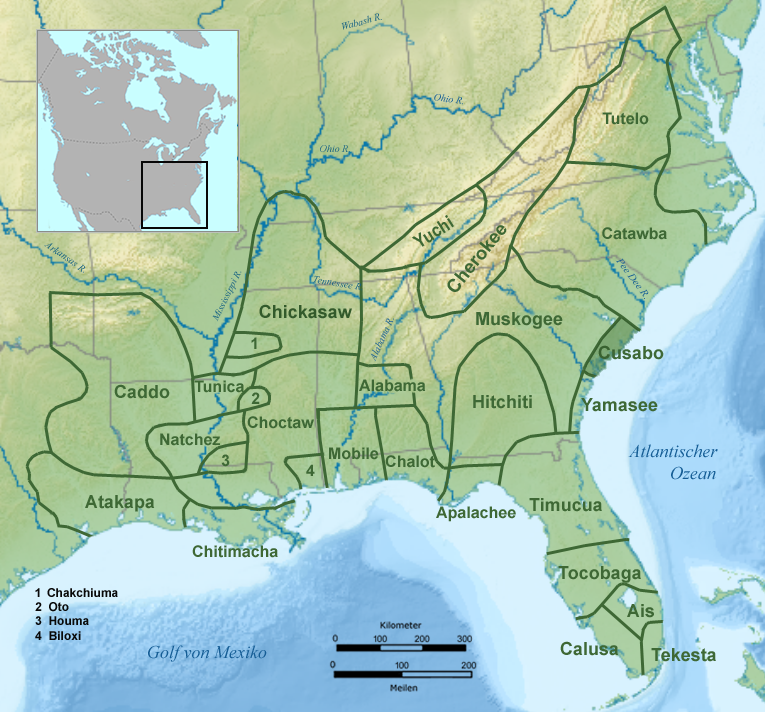
Tribal territory of the Cusabo during the 17th century highlighted

The Kiawah lived on or near the Ashley River from 1598 to 1682 and then on Kiawah Island from 1682 to 1695. Though the location of this is now unknown, the Kiawah were granted a land request for a reservation south of the Combahee River.

== Language ==
In 1605 and 1609 a Spanish colonizer employed an Indigenous person of Santa Elena who spoke Spanish and was able to translate the language of the Kiawah.

Few words in Cusabo survive and the language is unattested. Ethnographer John Reed Swanton suggested the Cusabo language may have been a Muskogean language.

== History ==
=== 16th century ===
Attempted settlements were made in the area by the French in 1562 and the Spaniards beginning in 1566. After being driven out in 1576, the Spanish returned and burned most, if not all, of the Cusabo villages of the Cusabo and the Guale. In 1598 the Kiawah and Escamacu raided Guale.

=== 17th century ===
English settler Robert Sanford wrote in his 1666 recollections that a Kiawah tribe member known by the title of Cassique welcomed him earnestly to the Kiawah "assuring [him] a broad deep entrance, and promising a large welcome and plentiful entertainment and trade." Supposedly it was the Cassique's pride for his country that encouraged the English to solidify the creation of their settlement.

Another English settler, Nicolas Carteret, recorded his travels from Bermuda to the Ashley River in a letter. His visit to the Port Royal (Charleston Harbor area since a settlement had been constructed there in April of 1670. A Kiawah native called the Casseeka (cacique or leader) assisted in the travels of Cartaret, who remarked that he was "a very ingenious Indian, and a great linguist."

=== 18th century ===
During the Yamasee War (1715–17), the Kiawah fought with the English against the Yamasee, Creek, Cherokee, Catawba, and other nations seeking revenge for abuse by traders.

The Kiawah gave a present to the Province of South Carolina in 1717. The British colonial government granted land to the south of the Combahee River to a Kiawah chief. The Kiawa were last recorded as living near Beaufort, South Carolina, in the 18th century, and Swanton writes they likely "gradually merged in the surrounding population."

== Population ==
By 1682, the date of the earliest regional census, the number of bowmen for the Kiawah tribe was said to have been reduced to 40, with the total population of all Cusabo tribes being 664. The 1715 census stated that the total Cusabo population, excluding the Etiwan, was 535, with 95 men and 200 children. Severe population depletion is said to be attributed to smallpox and other diseases in combination with attacks by the Spaniards and Indian allies of the French.

== Legacy ==
Kiawah Island, South Carolina, bears their name today.

A former nonprofit organization in Tennessee, the Guaymari Kiawah Tribe, identified as being descendants of the Kiawah.
