= Cusabo language =

Extinct language of South Carolina

Cusabo
- Native to: United States
- Region: South Carolina
- Ethnicity: Cusabo tribes, which include Etiwan, Kiawah, Wando, and others
- Extinct: 18th century
- Language family: Muskogean, Arawakan or Isolate

Language codes
- ISO 639-3: None (mis)
- Glottolog: cusa1237

The Cusabo language is the extinct language of the Cusabo people and is barely recorded. It does not appear to be related to any other known language families in North America.

There is evidence that at least five tribes on the South Carolina coast, who lived in the area between the lower Savannah and Wando Rivers (east of Charleston), spoke related languages that were different from the Guale, Sewee and other neighboring languages. It is likely the Ashepoo, Combahee, Escamaçu, Etiwan, and Kiawah spoke their own Cusaboan languages.

== Classifiation ==
Although in the 1930s, American anthropologist John Swanton theorized that the Cusabo may have spoken a form of the Muskogean language, linguistic research since the late 20th century disputes this.

Local place names do not match any Algonquian, Siouan-Catawban, Iroquoian or Muskogean languages, nor any other languages used by neighboring tribes. For example, the homelands of the Sewee and Santee have Catawban placenames, Catawban being a branch of the larger Siouan-Catawban language family, likely reflecting the presence of Catawban speakers.

== Vocabulary ==
Only a few words (mostly town names) of this language were recorded in the 16th century by French explorer René Goulaine de Laudonnière. (One example was Skorrye or Skerry 'bad', 'enemy'). Most words lack translations. Approximately 100 place names and 12 personal names in Cusabo have survived.

John R. Swanton thought that the bou or boo element in the Cusabo word Westo boe 'Westoe River', which occurs in many coastal place names, is related to the Choctaw word -bok (river). He speculated that Cusabo was related to the Muskogean family. Later scholars of the 21st century think this relation of sounds might have been a coincidence without meaning, especially since the older Choctaw form was bayok (meaning small river, river forming part of a delta). They believe that Cusabo was from a different language family altogether.

Blair Rudes has suggested that the -bo suffix and other evidence may indicate a relationship to the Arawakan languages of the Caribbean, which are ultimately from South America.
