= Louis Saint Ange Morel, chevalier de la Colombe =

Louis Saint Ange Morel, chevalier de la Colombe (1755–1825) was an aide de camp to Gilbert du Motier, marquis de Lafayette, during the Revolutionary War.

== Revolutionary War ==
He accompanied Lafayette to America, landing with him on North Island near Georgetown, South Carolina, on 13 June 1777. When Congress accepted Lafayette's service but not his French companions, he named Colombe as his aide de camp.

He returned to France with Lafayette on board the ship Alliance.

He returned to America with Rochambeau's expedition in 1780.

== War on Austria ==
France declared war on Austria on 20 April 1792, and preparations to invade the Austrian Netherlands were begun; Lafayette received command of one of the three armies, at Metz. On 10 August, a mob attacked the Tuileries. The king and his family were brought under guard to the Legislative Assembly who suspended Louis XVI and convoked the National Convention. New commissioners came to Sedan and informed Lafayette that he had been relieved of his command. On 19 August, the Assembly declared Lafayette a traitor.

Lafayette and a group of supporters decided to flee for the Dutch Republic. Lafayette hoped to escape to the United States or to rally Constitutional supporters, but did not make it; the Austrians under Field Marshal Moitelle, arrested him at Rochefort, Belgium. Among those arrested with him were Jean Baptiste Joseph, chevalier de Laumoy, Louis Saint Ange Morel, chevalier de la Colombe, Alexandre-Théodore-Victor, comte de Lameth, Charles César de Fay de La Tour-Maubourg, Marie Victor de Fay, marquis de Latour-Maubourg, Juste-Charles de Fay de La Tour-Maubourg, Jean-Xavier Bureau de Pusy.

He was released while Lafayette, Charles de la Tour Maubourg, and Bureau de Pusy, were imprisoned. Several days later, the prisoners were handed over to Prussia and imprisoned at the citadel of Wesel, where La Fayette became ill. From 25 August to 3 September 1792, he was held at Nivelles; then at Coblentz from 16 to 29 September 1794; at Magdeburg from 15 March 1793 to 22 Jan 1794; at Neisse from 16 February 1794 to 16 May 1794, and finally moved to Olmutz around 25 July 1794, where he was incarcerated in a dungeon.

== Exile ==
La Colombe was released and went to New York City.

In 1795, Georges Washington de La Fayette visited in New York on his way to Harvard and Mount Vernon.

He corresponded with George Washington about Lafayette's release from prison.
