= Action of 11 September 1779 =

Naval engagement off Charles Town, South Carolina

- Part of the War of the American Independence
Date	11 September 1779
Location	off Charles Town, South Carolina
Result	French victory

Belligerents
France	Great Britain

Commanders and leaders
Unknown	Thomas Mackenzie

Strength
Frigate Amazone (36 guns)	Post ship Ariel (24 guns)

Casualties and losses
Light	Ariel captured

The action of 11 September 1779 was a minor naval engagement that took place off Charles Town in the War of the American Independence between the French Navy and the Royal Navy at the Siege of Savannah. The battle ended with the capture of the British post ship Ariel by Amazone.

On 11 September 1779, whilst the Ariel was cruising off Charles Town under Captain Thomas Mackenzie, she sighted a strange sail and approached to investigate, unaware that a French fleet under the Admiral comte d'Estaing had entered the theatre from the West Indies. As Mackenzie got closer he realized that the stranger was actually a frigate, accompanied by two brigs and a schooner, and that she was not responding to his signals, he had to retreat for the Georgia shore. The frigate gradually overhauled Ariel and Mackenzie was forced to stand and fight. The enemy vessel was the 36-gun French Amazone. After a ninety-minute flight in which lost her mizzen-mast and all her rigging and sustained casualties of four men dead and another 20 wounded, Mackenzie surrendered Ariel. d'Estaing immediately exchanged the crew of Ariel and Experiment, which he had captured the year before, for French prisoners. The crews of these two vessels then went to man a variety of British vessels on the North America Station. The French took the captured ship into service as Ariel.

Ariel underwent repair and refitting at Lorient between March and October 1780. The French lent her to the American Continental Navy in October, where she served briefly as USS Ariel under John Paul Jones.
