= USS Wando (AT-17) =

Tugboat of the United States Navy

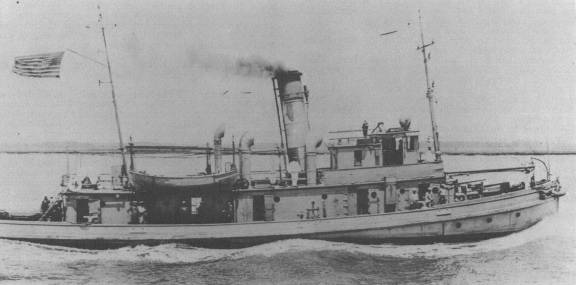
- USS Wando (Tug No. 17) at Charleston, South Carolina, on 4 June 1917

History

United States
- Name: USS Wando
- Namesake: The Wando, a Native American tribe of the Muskhpgean language group that lived South Carolina on the banks of the Cooper River
- Builder: Charleston Navy Yard
- Laid down: 14 June 1915
- Launched: 17 March 1916
- Commissioned: 3 April 1917
- Recommissioned: 15 March 1933
- Decommissioned: 18 April 1922; 3 July 1946
- Out of service: In reserve 18 April 1922-15 March 1933
- Reclassified: From Tug No. 17 to seagoing tug AT-17 17 July 1920; Harbor tug YT-123 17 February 1936; Large harbor tug YTB-123 15 April 1944
- Stricken: 30 December 1946
- Fate: Sold 28 April 1947

General characteristics
- Class & type: Wando-class tug
- Displacement: 575 tons
- Length: 123 ft 6.5 in (37.656 m)
- Beam: 26 ft 8 in (8.13 m)
- Draft: 11 ft 6 in (3.51 m) mean
- Complement: 23
- Armament: 2 × 3-pounder guns

The second USS Wando (Tug No. 17), later YT-17, later YT-123, later YTB-123, was a United States Navy tug in commission from 1917 to 1946.

== Construction and commissioning ==
Wando (Tug No. 17) was laid down on 14 June 1915 by the Charleston Navy Yard. Launched on 7 March 1916, she was commissioned on 3 April 1917.

== First period in commission (1917-1922) ==
Wando remained at the Charleston Navy Yard until 15 April 1917, when she got underway for New England waters and, with the ferryboat USS Wave (YFB-10) in tow, steamed north, via Lynnhaven Roads, Virginia and the New York Navy Yard in New York City, arriving at Newport, Rhode Island, on 21 April 1917. Shifting to Boston, Massachusetts via the Cape Cod Canal soon thereafter, she towed a coal barge to the New York Navy Yard on 25 April and 26 April 1917 and subsequently towed the scout cruiser USS Salem (CL-3) from Philadelphia, Pennsylvania, to the Boston Navy Yard before she returned, via Philadelphia, to the Charleston navy Yard on 19 May 1917, towing the torpedo boat USS Barney (TB-25).

After brief tours of duty at Georgetown, South Carolina and Jacksonville, Florida, Wando sailed for Hampton Roads, Virginia, anchoring with the fleet in the York River on 11 June 1917. Through the summer of 1917, the tug performed various utility duties —mostly towing targets and lighters, shifting target rafts and planting buoys - operating out of Tangier Sound and Yorktown, Virginia. During that time, she assisted the grounded battleship USS Louisiana (Battleship No. 19) on 6 July 1917.

In mid-August 1917, Wando underwent repairs at the Norfolk Navy Yard and there received a "minesweeping outfit." She departed Norfolk, Virginia, on 23 August 1917, heading for New York waters and reached "Base 10" — Port Jefferson, Long Island, New York — on the morning of 25 August 1917. From there she shifted to New London, Connecticut, where she received additional minesweeping gear from USS Baltimore (C-3) . On the evening of 8 September 1917, Wando embarked Captain Reginald R. Belknap, Commander, Mine Force and transported him to Newport, Rhode Island, arriving there later that evening. Wando subsequently performed buoy and net-tending functions off the Cornfield Light Vessel from 10 September 1917 to 13 September 1917.

Wando returned to New London on 16 September 1917 and the following day had more minesweeping gear installed. She again transported Captain Belknap as a passenger, from New London to Newport, before heading for Norfolk. For the remainder of September, Wando operated at "Base One," Tangier Sound, mooring target rafts, working on target moorings and making brief trips to the Norfolk Navy Yard for repairs or supplies. Wando subsequently remained in the Chesapeake Bay-Hampton Roads-Tangier Sound region through the autumn months of 1917 and into the winter.

Detached from her duty with the Mine Force on 19 November 1917, Wando resumed her operations with the Atlantic Fleet Train. However, she continued to perform the same basic duties, serving as target and net tender and delivering mail and dispatches through the end of March 1918. She subsequently towed targets for battleships engaging in gunnery exercises off the southern drill grounds, off the Virginia Capes and later laid buoys at the Potomac River Torpedo Range, off the mouth of the St. Mary's River.

Wando deployed in the Caribbean for the first time in early 1919. Underway from Norfolk on 6 February 1919, she arrived at Guantanamo Bay, Cuba, on 14 February 1919, with Pontoon No. 23 in tow. She performed her unglamorous service functions for the Fleet — towing targets, lighters and barges and delivering men and mail — in Cuban waters at Guantanamo Bay, Guacanayabo Bay and Manzanillo Bay until 17 April 1919, when she headed back to the United States.

Reaching New York on the 18 April 1919, Wando subsequently shifted to Hoboken, New Jersey, where she underwent repairs over the first few days of May 1919. Returning to Norfolk on 6 May 1919, Wando towed targets and performed general utility service with the Atlantic Fleet Train through mid-July 1919 and then operated in waters off the northern part of the United States East Coast out of Newport, New London and New York. She remained at New York City from 10 August 1919 to 10 January 1920.

Underway for Norfolk on 10 January 1920, Wando arrived there the next day but, on 14 January 1920, sailed south for Charleston. which she reached on 16 January 1920. Detached from the Atlantic Fleet Train on 26 January 1920, Wando was simultaneously assigned duties as a yard craft at the Charleston Navy Yard, her crew reduced to 14 men. While on active duty at Charleston, she was classified AT-17 on 17 July 1920, during the fleet-wide assignment of alphanumeric hull numbers.

Wando operated in the 6th Naval District, out of the Charleston Navy Yard, until 18 April 1922, when she was decommissioned and placed in reserve.

== Second period in commission (1933-1946) ==
Wando recommissioned at the Mare Island Navy Yard at Vallejo, California, on 15 March 1933. She was reclassified on 27 February 1936 from a seagoing tug (AT-17) to a harbor tug, YT-123.

Assigned to the 13th Naval District after her recommissioning to operate at the Puget Sound Navy Yard at Bremerton, Washington, Wando performed her vital but unsung tug services from the late 1930s through World War II. On 15 April 1944, she was reclassified again to a large harbor tug, YTB-123, a classification she carried for the remainder of her active naval service.

== Final decommissioning and sale ==
Ultimately placed both out of service and out of commission and 3 July 1946, Wando was delivered to the Maritime Commission's War Shipping Administrationfor disposal. Her name was struck from the Navy List on 30 December 1946 and she was acquired by the Puget Sound Tug and Barge Company on 28 April 1947.
