= Wando people =

Extinct Indigenous tribe of the Southeastern Woodlands

Wando

Total population
- extinct as a tribe

Regions with significant populations
- Southeast South Carolina

Languages
- Cusabo language

Religion
- Native American religion

Related ethnic groups
- other Cusabo people

The Wando were a nation of Native Americans who were part of the loose Cusabo alliance based on kinship and cultural similarity. They lived in South Carolina on the banks of the Cooper River. Their name is also spelled Wandoe. Another member of the alliance, the Ittiwan, lived on the Wando River.

== Language ==
The Cusabo language is barely attested.

== History ==
Spaniards explored Charleston Harbor in 1605. English colonists settled near Wando territory in 1670.

In 1675, the Wando, along with their allies, such as the Ittiwan, Sampa, and Sewee petitioned the English settler Maurice Mathews to have protected and reserved lands for them to live in without worry of encroachment. The colonial council agreed to establish a reservation for these tribes to settle near Charleston Harbor, with the Wando and Sewee settling on the southern banks of the Wando River.

The Sewee people lost the majority of their men to an ill-fated ocean voyage, in which they planned to travel to England, but instead were caught in a storm. Survivors were saved by British vessels only to be sold into slavery in the Caribbean. The remaining Sewee were forced to join the Wando.

Swanton surmises that the Wando merged into their neighboring peoples.

== Legacy ==
The Wando River was named for the nation. The United States Navy tug USS Wando, in commission from 1917–1922 and 1933–1946, was named for them. Wando High School is also named for them.
