= Sewee =

Extinct Indigenous tribe of the Southeastern Woodlands

Sewee

Total population
- extinct as a tribe

Regions with significant populations
- South Carolina

Languages
- regarded as speakers of one of the eastern Siouan languages.

Religion
- Native American religion

Related ethnic groups
- Catawba, merged with the Wando people

The Sewee or "Islanders" were a historical Indigenous people of the Southeastern Woodlands, who lived in present-day South Carolina in North America.

Their territory was on the lower course of the Santee River and the coast westward to the divide of Ashley River, around present-day Moncks Corner, South Carolina.

== History ==
Ethnologist John Reed Swanton estimated there were 800 Sewee in 1600.

In 1670, the English founded the coastal town of Charleston in the Carolina Colony on land belonging to the Sewee, the Etiwan people, and neighboring tribes. Sewee and other Native peoples began participating in the Deerskin trade with English colonists shortly thereafter. The Sewee hunted, processed, and exchanged deer hides for manufactured goods and glass beads from the English. However, they felt that English traders had become middlemen. Noting that the English ships always landed at the same location, the Sewee believed that by rowing to the point on the horizon where the ships first appeared, they could reach England and negotiate better trading prices. Therefore, the Sewee people decided to construct canoes with woven mat sails for their expedition.

English land surveyor John Lawson, having heard the story from a Carolina trader, described the process in his book A New Voyage to Carolina:

It was agreed upon immediately to make an addition of their fleet by building more canoes, and those to be of the best sort and biggest size as fit for their intended discovery. Some Indians employed about making the canoes, others to hunting – everyone to the post he was most fit for, all endeavors towards an able fleet and cargo for Europe.

Eventually, the Sewee completed their navy of canoes, and they filled the vessels with hides, pelts, and provisions. Most able-bodied Sewee men boarded the boats and took to the sea, while children, the sick, and the elderly stayed home. As the Sewee entered open ocean, an abrupt storm engulfed their canoes and caused many to drown. The survivors were picked up by a passing English slave ship and sold into slavery in the West Indies.

The surviving Sewee settled with the Wando people, with whom they later intermarried.

== See also ==
- Catawba
- Cheraw
- Cusabo
- Muscogee
- Peedee
- Tomahittan
- Waccamaw
- Winyah
- Yuchi
