= Escamacu people =

Historical Indigenous people of the Southeastern Woodlands

Escamacu
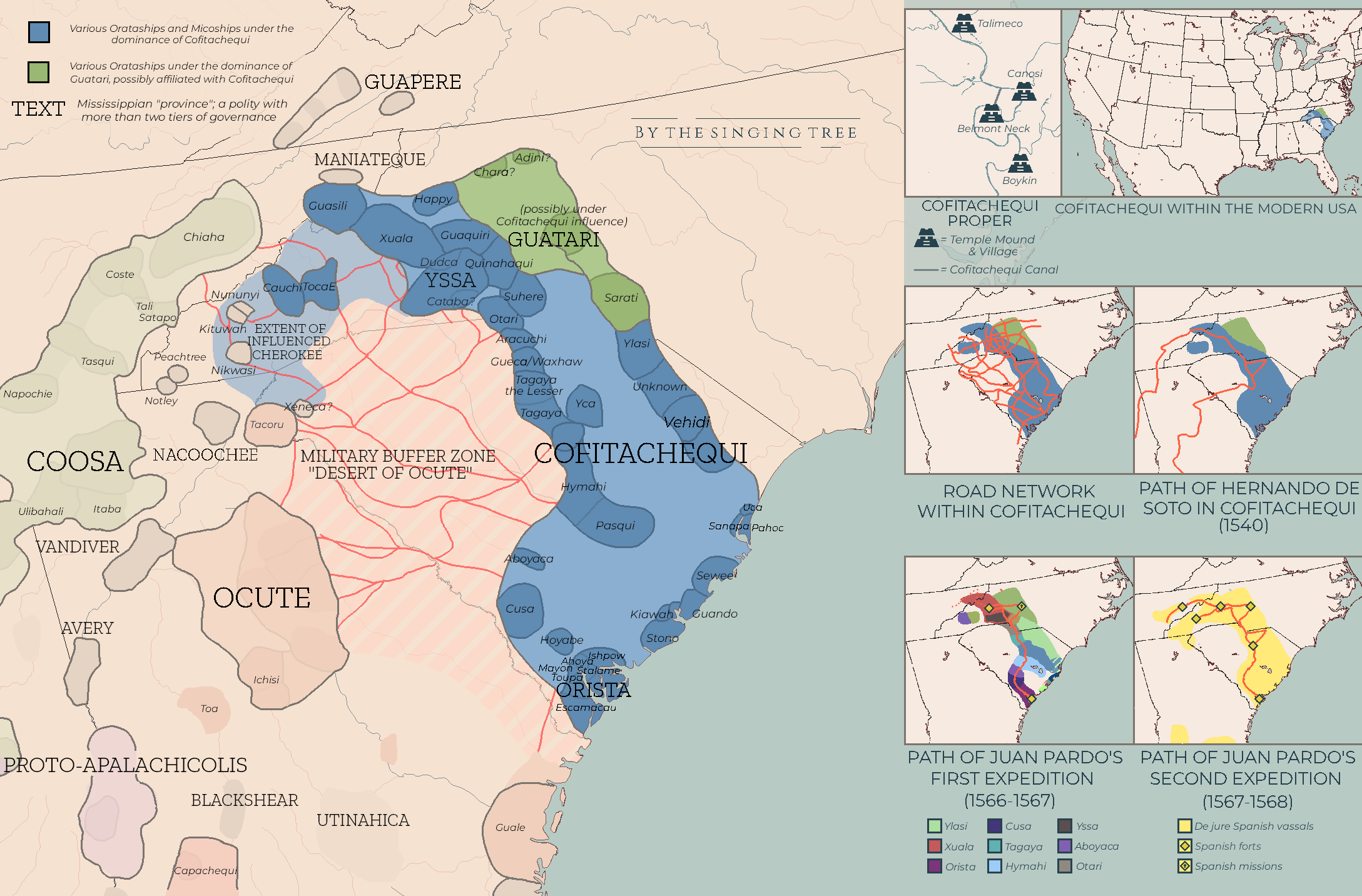
- The Southeastern United States in the 16th century. The Escamacu are located at the bottom right of the map.

Total population
- Extinct as a tribe (18th century)

Regions with significant populations
- South Carolina, U.S.

Languages
- Unattested

Religion
- Indigenous religion

Related ethnic groups
- other Cusabo tribes

The Escamacu people (also Escamaku, St. Helena, and Santa Elena) were a small Native American tribe of the South Carolina Lowcountry from the 16th to 18th centuries. Their homeland was in the 20 miles (32 km) wide coastal area between the Savannah River and Port Royal Island, encompassing what later became Hilton Head island and the towns of Bluffton and Beaufort.

Although numbering only a few hundred people, the Escamacu played a leading role in the destruction of the Santa Elena (1566–1587) colony of the Spanish. In the 1660s, they became one of the Indian peoples who suffered from the slave-raiding Westo tribe and the British colonists of Virginia. With the founding of the British settlement at Charles Town in 1670, they became allies of the Province of Carolina and part of the "settlement Indians" or Cusabo. In the 18th century, they lost their identity as a distinct people.

== Culture ==
The Escamacu appear to have resided in the low county for thousands of years. Excavactions of the Santa Elena archaeological site on Parris Island indicates an occupation of 4,000 years. Their language was probably not related to the Muskogean of the inland chiefdoms. The affiliation of the Escamacu's language with other languages is unknown, although probably related to that of some of the other Low Country tribes.

The culture of the Escamacu was typical of the more than a dozen small tribes inhabiting the swamps, estuaries, and forests of the South Carolina coast. Although living 150 miles (240 km) from the large, agricultural, and town-dwelling chiefdom of Ocute in the interior of Georgia, the Escamacu were not much influenced by the Mississippian culture. They Escamacu practiced instead a hunter-gatherer lifestyle, although they began to cultivate small amounts of maize about 1400 CE. They were seasonably mobile, living near the coast in the warmer months, but breaking into smaller family groups and migrating a few miles inland in the cooler months.Their villages consisted of about twenty thatched-roofed houses and a population of 200 people. A large, round council house was at the center of the villages.

== Escamacu war ==
In 1562, the French established a short-lived settlement called Charlesfort on what is today Parris Island. An Escamacu village was about 20 miles (32 km) upstream on the Broad River. A larger village of the Orista (or Edisto) tribe was near the Escamacu village. In 1566, a Spanish conquistador Pedro Menendez de Aviles established a settlement they named Santa Elena on the same site as Charlesfort. The Spanish population of Santa Elena grew to become 400 to 500 soldiers and civilians. Two forts were nearby. From Santa Elena Juan Pardo led two military expeditions hundreds of miles into the interior of what became North Carolina and Tennessee. A Jesuit missionary named Juan Rogel and later Franciscan missionaries lived with the Orista and Escamacu, but efforts to convert them to Christianity were unsuccessful and in 1574 the missionaries departed.

The soldiers at Santa Elena demanded maize from the Indians, but the Indians demanded gifts in return. The Spanish became more oppressive. On 17 June 1576, 22 Spanish soldiers entered the Escamacu village and demanded food and shelter. The Escamacu fled into the forest. The Spanish were armed and ready for an attack, but an elderly Escamacu persuaded them to relax and extinguish the fuses on their matchlocks. When they did so, the Escamacu attacked, killing all the soldiers except one. In the following days, the Escamacu acquired as allies the Guale, Orista, and other tribes and killed 26 or more additional Spaniards, both soldiers and government officials. With an army estimated at 500 men, they forced the evacuation of San Felipe, one of the forts at Santa Elena. One hundred French castaways marooned in South Carolina joined the Indians.

The Spanish governor of Florida, Pedro Menendez Marquez responded by sending 200 soldiers to Santa Elena, building a new fort, attacking and burning many villages up and down the coasts of South Carolina and Georgia, killing hundreds of Indians, and capturing the French castaways. By 1580 the war was over. However, in 1587 the Spanish made the decision to abandon Santa Elena and the Escamacu and others had 70 years of relative peace before the onslaught of the Westo slave raiders disturbed their world once again.

== Later history ==
In the late 17th and early 18th century, the Escamacu were decimated by slave raiders, diseases of European origin, and abuses and encroachment on their lands by the South Carolina settlers. After the Yamasee War (1715–1717), only five of the coastal tribes survived, including the Escamacu. Harassed by other tribes and British settlers, the lowland Indians unsuccessfully petitioned the South Carolina government for help. The last petition that included the Escamacu, then called the St. Helena, was in 1743. In 1751, the Governor of South Carolina named the Etiwan as the only surviving coastal tribe.
