= Cusabo =

Group of American Indian tribes

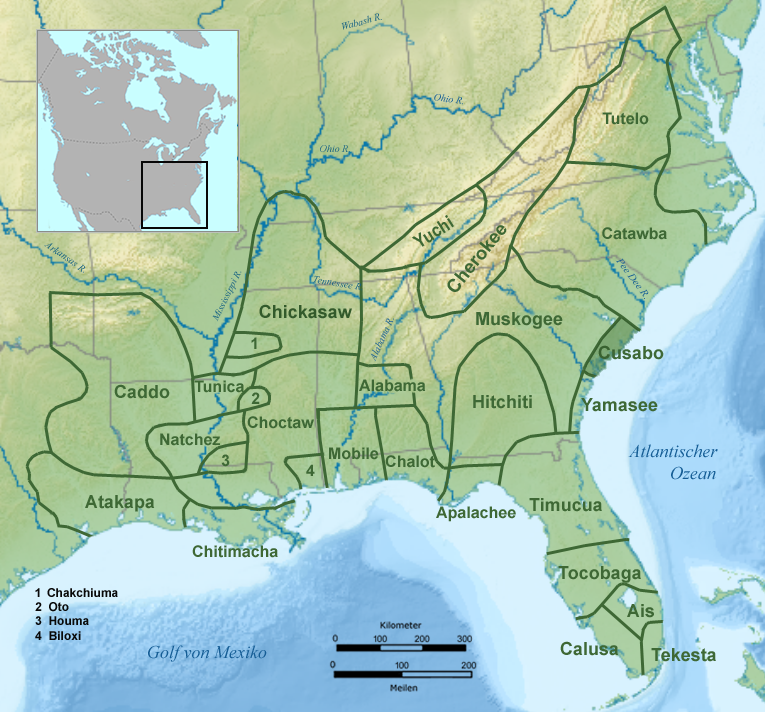
- Tribal territory of the Cusabo during the 17th century highlighted

Total population
- Extinct as tribes

Regions with significant populations
- South Carolina, United States

Languages
- Cusabo language

Religion
- Indigenous religion

Related ethnic groups
- Unclear, perhaps Muskogean or Arawakan speakers

The Cusabo were a group of American Indian tribes who lived along the coast of the Atlantic Ocean in what is now South Carolina, approximately between present-day Charleston and south to the Savannah River, at the time of European colonization. English colonists often referred to them as one of the Settlement Indians of South Carolina, tribes who "settled" among the colonists.

Five of the groups were recorded by the settlers as having spoken a common language, although one distinctly different from the major language families known nearby, such as Algonquian, Iroquoian, Muskogean, and Siouan. With the English settling on their land at Charleston beginning in the 17th century, the Cusabo developed a chafing relationship with the colony that persisted through the early 18th century. After the Yamasee War of 1715 surviving tribal members migrated to join the Muscogee or Catawba.

== Political divisions ==
Subtribes of the Cusabo included:

- Ashepoo (Ishpow)
- Bohicket
- Combahee
- Escamaçu (also known as the St. Helena Indians)
- Edisto (also spelled Orista and Edistow)
- Etiwan (also Ittiwan, Ittawan or Eutaw)
- Hoya
- Kiawah
- Kussah
- Kussoe (also spelled Cusso, Coosaw, Coosawa, or Cussoe; not the same people as the earlier Coosa chiefdom of the Mississippian culture in Georgia)
- Mayon
- Santee
- Sampa
- Sewee
- Stalame
- Stono
- Touppa
- Wando
- Wapoo
- Wimbee
- Witcheaugh

== Language ==
The Cusabo tribes spoke the Cusabo language, which is poorly attested and unclassified but it may have been an linguistic isolate. It went extinct in the 18th century.

== History ==
=== 16th century ===
The names of many subtribes of the Cusabo and Catawba people may be recognized among the provinces that were described by Francisco de Chicora, a native who was kidnapped from the Pee Dee River area by Spanish in 1521. He was taken by the expedition back to Spain, where he learned Spanish. His Testimony of Francisco de Chicora was recorded by the court chronicler Peter Martyr and published in 1525. On 1526, Lucas Vázquez de Ayllón's party visited this area and recorded some names.

=== 17th century ===
The English colony of South Carolina was founded in the midst of Cusabo land, and the loose group of tribes became closely tied to the colony. In the first decade after the founding of Charles Town in 1670, there was conflict and warfare between some of the Cusabo and the English colonists. The Kussoe (Coosa) subtribe was the first to come into violent conflict; Carolina declared war against them in October 1671. The Kussoe went into hiding but remained in the area. In the early years of the colony, the Indians could "lie low" if they wanted. For three years, colonial records make no mention of the Kussoe or the war.

In 1674 records note an alleged Kussoe attack in which three colonists were killed. During the same year the Stono, a Cusabo subtribe, fought with the colony. This conflict (not to be confused with the later Stono Rebellion of African slaves) was similar to the Kussoe War. Colonial records are unclear on how the Kussoe-Stono War ended, except that it was resolved in South Carolina's favor. The colony forced the tribes to cede large tracts of rich land. In addition, they required the Kussoe to make a symbolic tribute payment of one deerskin per month. The Kussoe, Stono, and other Cusabo subtribes remained in the area, living in relative accord with the colonists until the Yamasee War of 1715.

One of South Carolina's first powerful Indian allies was the Westo tribe, who during the 1670s conducted numerous slave raid attacks on nearly every other Indian group in the region. Contemporary scholars believe the Westo were an Iroquoian tribe who had migrated from the Great Lakes area, possibly an offshoot of the Erie during the Beaver Wars. By 1674, South Carolina colonists came into direct conflict with the Westo. The colony demanded that the Westo cease attacking the Cusabo and other Settlement Indians. Continued Westo attacks played a role in South Carolina's decision to destroy the Westo, which they did with assistance from other Native Americans from 1679 to 1680.

=== 18th century ===
By the turn of the 18th century, the Cusabo had become fairly integrated into South Carolina's colonial society. They retained their tribal identities and lived in their own villages. A relationship developed between the two groups, with the Indians serving as a kind of police and security force in exchange for trade goods, weapons, and money. The colony paid the Cusabo for killing "vermin", major predators such as wolves, "tigers" (cougars), and bears. The Cusabo also hunted game animals and sold the meat to colonists. But their chief service was in capturing fugitive enslaved Africans. South Carolina colonial authorities tried to encourage hostility between the two groups to avoid an alliance between them. They passed laws to reward Indians for capturing runaway slaves, and absolved them of liability if runaways were killed in the process. In contrast, Africans were punished severely for attacking Indians. As late as 1750, reportedly more than 400 "ancient native" (or Settlement Indians) lived within South Carolina, with their "chief service" being "hunting Game, destroying Vermin and Beasts of Prey, and in capturing Runaway slaves."

During the Tuscarora War, the Cusabo joined the first South Carolina army under John Barnwell. They fought against the Tuscarora in North Carolina in 1711 and 1712. These were an Iroquoian-speaking people. Part of the "Yamasee Company", the Cusabo warriors numbered fewer than 15 men. After the Yamasee War, most of the Tuscarora migrated north to western New York, where they joined the Five Nations of the Iroquois League, known as the Haudenosaunee. They lived near the Oneida in their territory and declared their migration finished in 1722.

In 1712, South Carolina granted Polawana Island, near Saint Helena Island, to the Cusabo, where many were already living. Barnwell took a census in early 1715 that listed the Cusabo ("Corsaboy") as living in five villages and having a population of 95 men and 200 women and children. The Itwan, a Cusabo subtribe, was listed separately as living in one village with a population of 80 men and 160 women and children.

During the Yamasee War of 1715, the Cusabo were one of the few Indian groups who sided with the colony of South Carolina. After the war, most of them migrated from the area, joining either the Catawba or the Muscogee, who had territory to the west and south, respectively. The Catawba territory extended into western North Carolina and the upper Catawba River valley.

== Bibliography ==
- Waddell, Gene (2004). "Cusabo". In Fogelson, Raymond D. (ed.). Handbook of North American Indians, Vol. 14. Washington, DC: Smithsonian Institution. pp. 254–265. ISBN 0-16-072300-0.
