= The Mills House Hotel =

Historic hotel in Charleston, South Carolina

Mills House Charleston, Curio Collection by Hilton
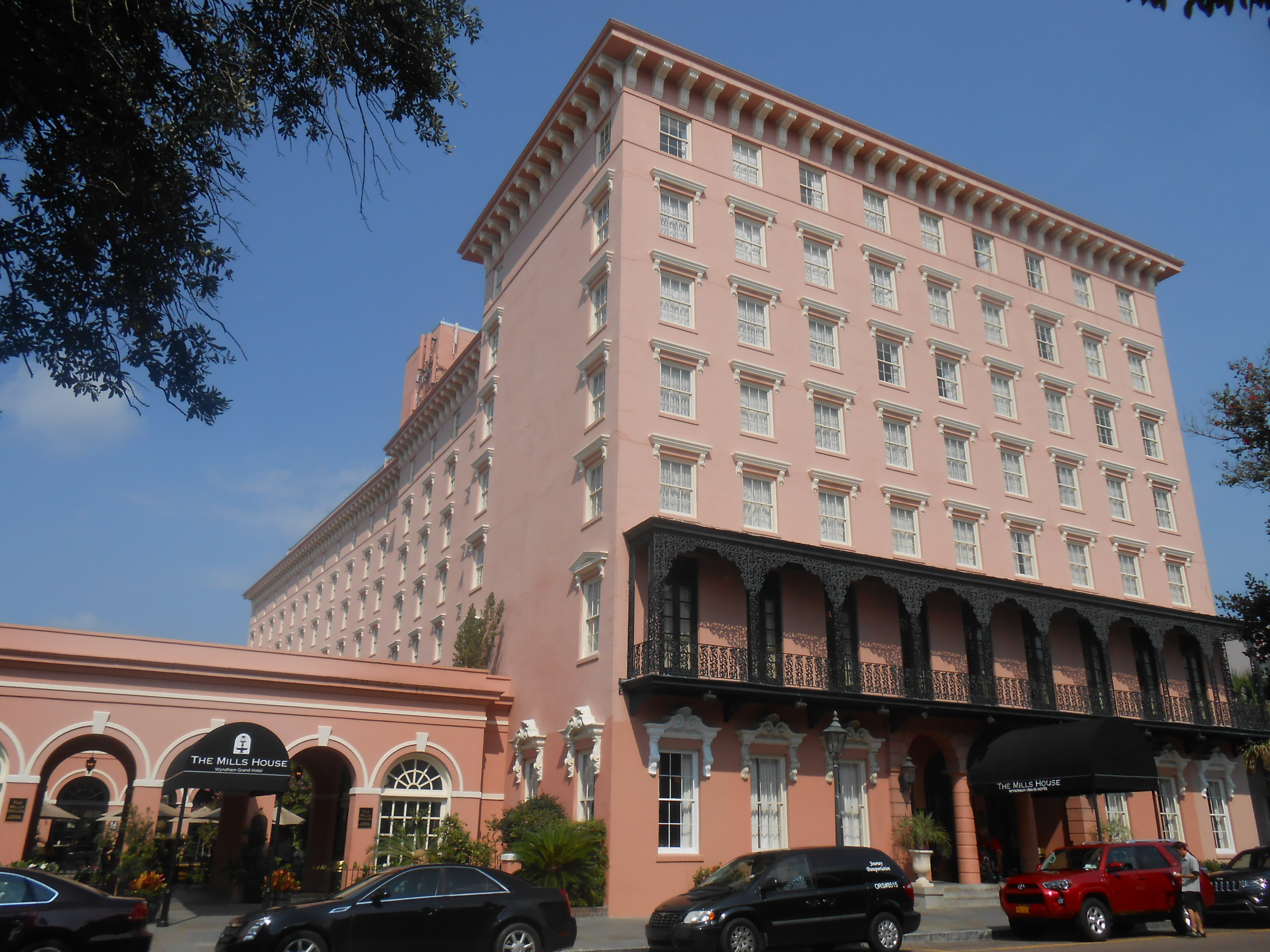
- Interactive map of the Mills House Charleston, Curio Collection by Hilton area

General information
- Location: Charleston, South Carolina, 115 Meeting Street
- Opening: October 9, 1970
- Owner: RLJ Lodging Trust
- Operator: Hilton Hotels

Design and construction
- Architects: Curtis and Davis

Other information
- Number of rooms: 218

Website
- Official website

The Mills House Charleston, Curio Collection by Hilton is a historic hotel in Charleston, South Carolina, United States. It opened in 1970, but its facade is based on the original historic hotel that sat on the site from 1853 to 1968.

== History ==
=== First Mills House/St. John Hotel ===
The Mills House Hotel was built by local grain merchant Otis Mills and opened on November 3, 1853. The 180-room hotel was designed by architect John E. Earle and cost $200,000. The original plan for the hotel would have filled the entire block between Hibernian Hall to the south and Queen St. to the north, but a rival hotelier purchased one of the necessary lots first and refused to sell it.

The hotel survived the destruction of much of the city in the Civil War and was later renamed the St. John Hotel at the turn of the twentieth century. When President Theodore Roosevelt visited the South Carolina Inter-State and West Indian Exposition in 1902, he stayed at the hotel. It gradually declined as newer hotels opened, and was finally sold at auction in 1968 to Charleston Associates (Richard H. Jenrette, Charles D. Ravenel, and Charles H. P. Duell).

=== Modern Mills House ===
The new owners intended to restore the historic hotel, but found that the structure was unsalvageable. They demolished it in late 1968 (but saved the ironwork and cornices to reinstall) and built a 217-room replica with a largely faithful facade, only increased from five to seven stories. A three-story, brick building to the south (111 Meeting Street) was also razed to make way for a side entrance to the new hotel and a garden area.

Construction of the new hotel began on April 3, 1969. The hotel was designed by the New Orleans firm of Curtis and Davis, with the Ruscon Construction Company as the general contractor, and local architects Simons, Lapham, Mitchell and Small consulting on exterior design and historic details. The original 79-foot iron balcony across the front was replaced with a 75-foot version, and some changes were made to the window cornices (the cornices on the first two floors were cast from originals, but upper floors received different cornices than the original). The chandelier in the Meeting Street lobby was acquired from Belle Meade Plantation, a Nashville, Tennessee house that was designed by William Strickland.

The hotel opened on October 9, 1970, managed by Hyatt as The Mills Hyatt House. The hotel left Hyatt in 1983 and joined the Holiday Inn chain. It was marketed both with and without the chain name, sometimes as the Holiday Inn Mills House Hotel and also as The Mills House Hotel. The hotel's owner, the Bristol Hotel Company, was sold to FelCor Lodging Trust in 1998. The hotel left Holiday Inn after thirty years and joined the Wyndham chain on March 1, 2013 and was renamed The Mills House Wyndham Grand Hotel. FelCor was sold to RLJ Lodging Trust, run by billionaire BET founder Robert L. Johnson, in 2017. In October 2021, RLJ Lodging Trust selected Davidson Hospitality to assume management of the hotel. They extensively renovated the hotel, and moved it from Wyndham to Hilton's Curio Collection brand on October 1, 2022, renaming it Mills House Charleston, Curio Collection by Hilton.

== Gallery ==
The Mills House Hotel

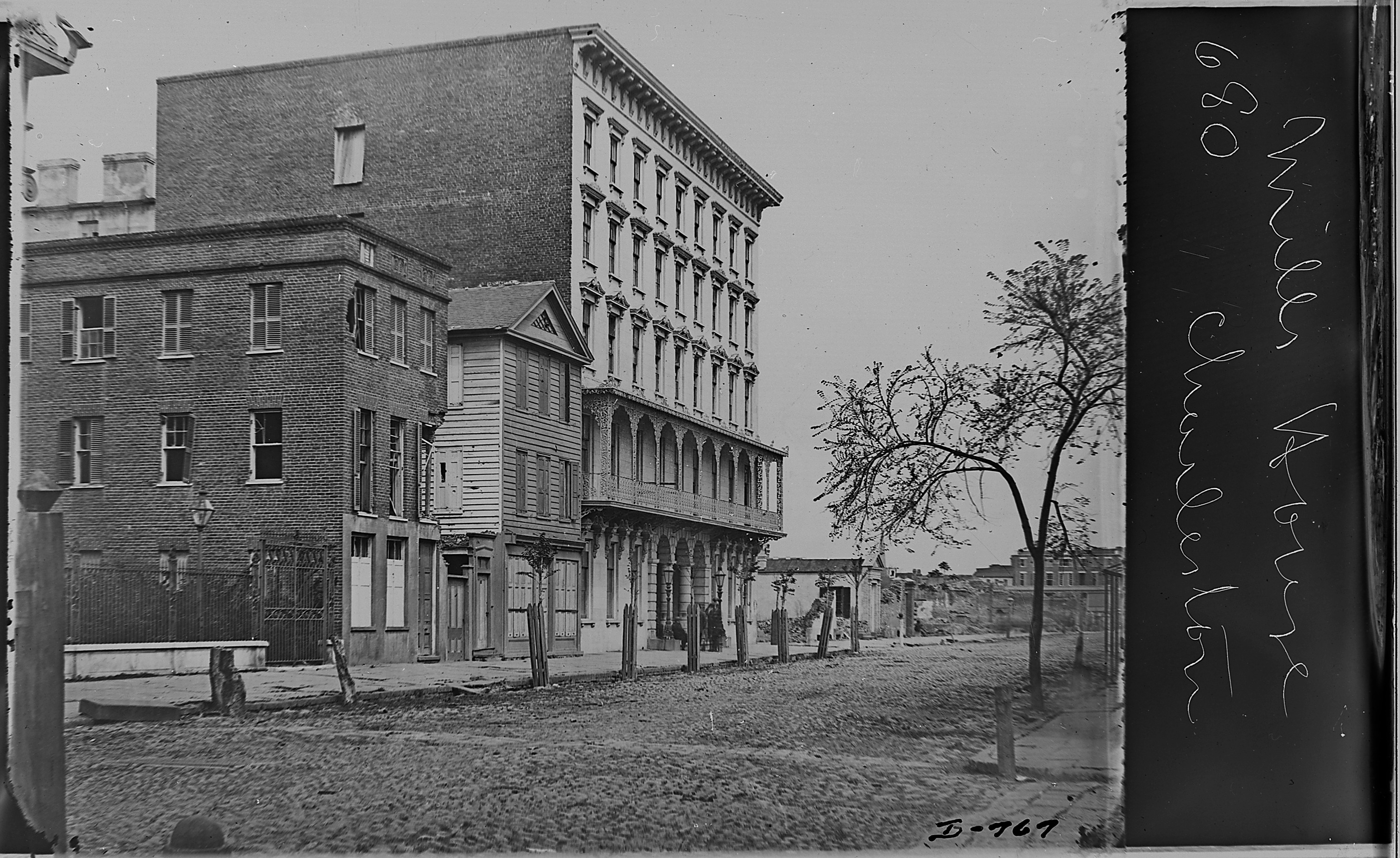
The original Mills House in the 1860s

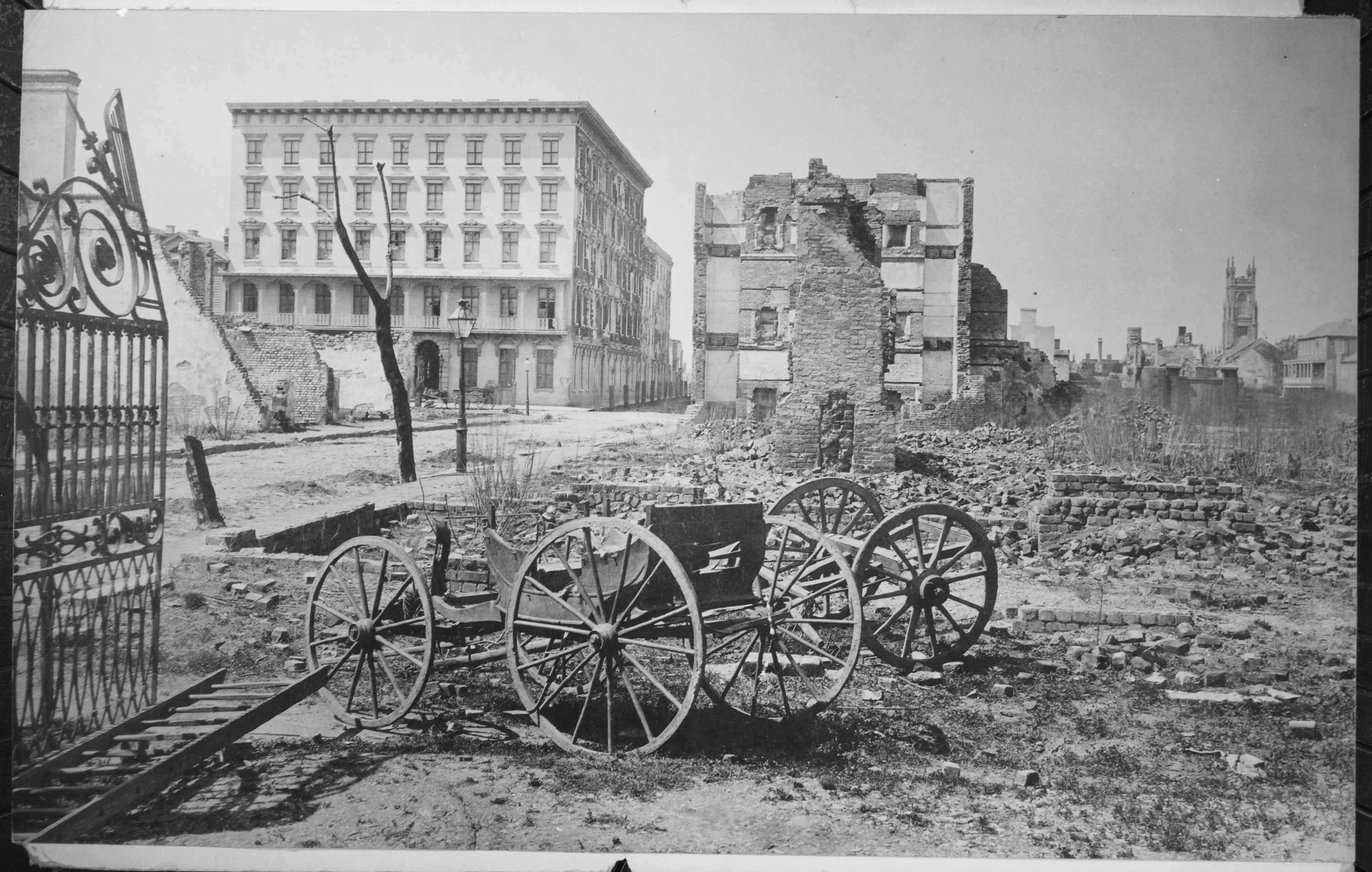
The Mills House, surrounded by the ruins of Charleston, 1865

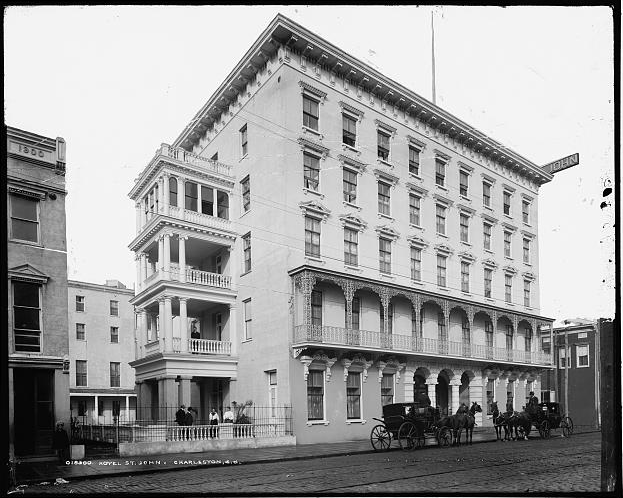
Renamed the St. John Hotel, 1905
