= HMS Ariel (1777) =

20-gun Sphinx-class sixth-rate post ship of the British Royal Navy

History

Great Britain
- Name: HMS Ariel
- Ordered: 3 July 1776
- Builder: John Perry & Co, Blackwall Yard
- Laid down: July 1776
- Launched: 7 July 1777
- Completed: 12 August 1777
- Commissioned: July 1777
- Captured: By the French Navy on 10 September 1779

France & US
- Name: Ariel
- Acquired: Captured on 10 September 1779
- Out of service: Lent to the Continental Navy between October 1780 and June 1781
- Fate: Burnt in March 1793

General characteristics
- Class & type: 20-gun Sphinx-class sixth-rate post ship
- Displacement: 650 tons (French)
- Tons burthen: 43519/94 (bm)
- Length: 108 ft (32.9 m) (gundeck); 89 ft 5 in (27.3 m) (keel)
- Beam: 30 ft 3 in (9.2 m)
- Depth of hold: 9 ft 7 1/2 in (2.9 m)
- Sail plan: Full-rigged ship
- Complement: British service: 140; French service: 130 (peace) and 210 (war)
- Armament: British service: 20 × 9-pounder guns; French service: 2 × 4-pounder + 4 × 3-pounder guns added to the galliards

HMS Ariel was a 20-gun Sphinx-class sixth-rate post ship of the Royal Navy. The French captured her in 1779, and she served during the American Revolutionary War for them, and later for the Americans, before reverting to French control. Her French crew scuttled Ariel in 1793 to prevent the British from recapturing her.

== British career ==
The Admiralty on 3 July 1776 ordered Ariel from John Perry & Co.'s Blackwall Yard. Perry & Co. laid down her keel that month and launched her on 7 July 1777. She was commissioned under Captain John Jackson, and cruised in the North Sea in August 1777. After a brief spell off the Norwegian and Danish coasts, she sailed for North America on 7 November.

In 1778 she captured several American vessels. While Ariel was under the command of John Becher on 31 March, she shared in the capture of the frigate USS Virginia. (The Royal Navy took Virginia into service as HMS Virginia.)

On 25 May 1778, under command of Capt. Charles Phipps, she captured the schooner General Scott. On 31 May she pursued a sloop until the sloop ran aground near Currituck, North Carolina. Bad weather prevented boarding.

On 4 June Ariel captured the sloop Fanny, or "Fancy". On 7 June she had prize "Fancy" capture sloop "Mary's Adventure" about 5 leagues north northwest of Cape Lookout. Then on 27 August 1778 she captured the 16-gun "Congress" brig Resistance. (Note: Resistance was carried on the accounts of Nathaniel Shaw, Jr., Naval Agent at New London, Connecticut from April 1776 until November 1778. In December of 1777, while under the command of Captain Samuel Chew, she put into Boston with a prize whose £7,000 cargo had been destined for the West Indies. After the British captured Resistance in 1778, her name was struck from the lists of the Continental Navy.) Resistance had sailed from Boston armed for war and in quest of the French fleet. Ariel burnt her.

Ariel also shared in the prize money for a number of vessels captured between 2 January and 14 September. These were the sloops Betsy and Polly, brigs M'Cleary, Reprizal, Argyle, and Postillion, the schooner Chelsea, and the snow David. On 12 May Ariel pursued the French polacca Gaston until her crew ran her aground near Cape Hatteras; her crew scuttled and abandoned Gaston. Ariel salvaged part of Gaston's cargo before burning her. Next, Ariel chased two schooners, one named Trader's Increase, ashore and burned them. On the 14th Ariel chased the schooner Two Friends ashore, captured her, and refloated her.

She captured the American privateer New Broom on 22 October 1778, as well as the schooners Lark and Three Friends. New Broom was armed with 16 guns and had sailed from New London when Ariel and Savage stopped her off Nantucket shoals. The Royal Navy took New Broom into service as Keppel.

The next year, in February, Captain Thomas Mackenzie replaced Phipps.

== Capture ==
On 11 September 1779, whilst Ariel was cruising off Charleston, South Carolina, she sighted a strange sail and approached to investigate, unaware that the French fleet under Admiral d'Estaing had entered the theatre. As Mackenzie got closer he realized that the stranger was actually a frigate, accompanied by two brigs and a schooner, and that she was not responding to his signals. He therefore decided to sail for the Georgia shore. The frigate gradually overhauled Ariel and Mackenzie had no choice but to stand and fight. The enemy vessel was the 32-gun French frigate Amazone, under Lieutenant Lapérouse After a ninety-minute flight in which Ariel lost her mizzen-mast and all her rigging and sustained casualties of four men dead and another 20 wounded, Mackenzie surrendered Ariel. d'Estaing immediately exchanged the crew of Ariel and HMS Experiment, which he had captured the year before, for French prisoners. The crews of these two vessels then went on to man a variety of British vessels on the station. The French took the captured ship into service as Ariel.

Ariel underwent repair and refitting at Lorient between March and October 1780. The French then lent her to the American Continental Navy in October, where she served briefly as USS Ariel.

== USS Ariel ==
John Paul Jones assumed command of Ariel in France. He changed her rigging to improve her sailing qualities, and removed 10 of her 26 guns to make room for more cargo. However, loading the ship and the need to obtain other vessels to carry the surplus cargo which Ariel could not hold delayed her departure. Ariel — accompanied by merchantmen Luke and Duke of Leinster, which Benjamin Franklin had chartered to take care of the surplus supplies — departed L'Orient on 5 September, but contrary winds held them up in Groix Roads for over a month. The trio finally put to sea on 7 October. However, the next day one of the most severe storms in the history of the French coast broke and wreaked great havoc in the area, destroying many ships. Ariel lost all of her masts, sprang leaks, and suffered much other damage. Only Jones's superb seamanship enabled her to stay afloat and then to limp back into Groix Roads under a jury rig on the morning of 12 October.

Luke—faster and less damaged than Ariel—also managed to get back to port, but sailed independently before Ariel's repairs could be completed; a British warship then captured Luke. No record has been found of Duke of Leinster after her departure on 7 October, so it is quite possible that she foundered during the hurricane.

More than two months passed before Ariel was again seaworthy. She finally got underway again on 18 October. Jones left much of Ariel's armament in France so he followed a southern route in the hope of avoiding encountering the Royal Navy.

Still, when Ariel had reached a point some 200 miles north of the Leeward Islands, a lookout reported a large ship that soon began to approach Ariel. Rather than risk his partially-armed only ship and the vital cargo and dispatches that she was carrying, Jones reluctantly fled. Jones hoped that she would shake off her pursuer during the night, but the stranger was in full sight when daylight returned the following morning, closer than she had been when last seen the previous evening.

Jones then decided to try to pass Ariel off as a British warship. When his pursuer reached hailing distance, Jones demanded that her captain identify himself and his ship. The stranger was the 20-gun British privateer Triumph, commanded by John Pindar. Jones then ordered Pindar to come on board Ariel with documents to verify his identity. When Pindar refused, Jones opened fire and forced his surprised enemy to surrender following a short and one-sided struggle. However, after Triumph had struck her colors, Pindar maneuvered his ship to Ariel's weather bow while the latter was lowering a boat for a prize crew, and then quickly escaped.

This engagement was John Paul Jones' last battle in the cause of American freedom, but he soon had to forestall a budding mutiny. He uncovered a plot by the English seamen whom he had enlisted from among British prisoners of war in France to fill out his crew (built around survivors from Bonhomme Richard), to take over Ariel; Jones put the troublemakers in irons. The rest of her voyage was uneventful; Ariel finally reached Philadelphia with her badly needed military stores—which included 437 barrels of gunpowder, 146 chests of arms, a large quantity of shot, sheet lead, and much medicine—on 18 February 1781.

At the beginning of March, Ariel—still in port discharging her cargo—fired a salute to celebrate Maryland's ratification of the Articles of Confederation activating the new nation's first central government.

Early in June 1781, Jones turned Ariel over to Anne-César, Chevalier de la Luzerne-the French minister to the United States—who manned her with a French crew for the voyage back to France.

== Ariel ==
In May, Latouche-Tréville manned Ariel with sailors from the cutter Guêpe, wrecked in February 1781 at Cape Charles. The frigate Hermione then escorted her to Newport, where the French squadron under Barras was anchored.

In September 1782 Ariel and Surveillante captured the merchant vessel Grand Duc off the coast of Spain. The French navy briefly took Grand Duc into service before decommissioning, striking off, and selling her for £t 72,489 at Brest in 1783.

== Fate ==
After the French defeat at Neerwinden, her crew scuttled Ariel on the Scheldt in March 1793. The citizens of Bruges carried off her armament and stores.
