= Attested language =

Linguistic varieties with direct evidence of having existed

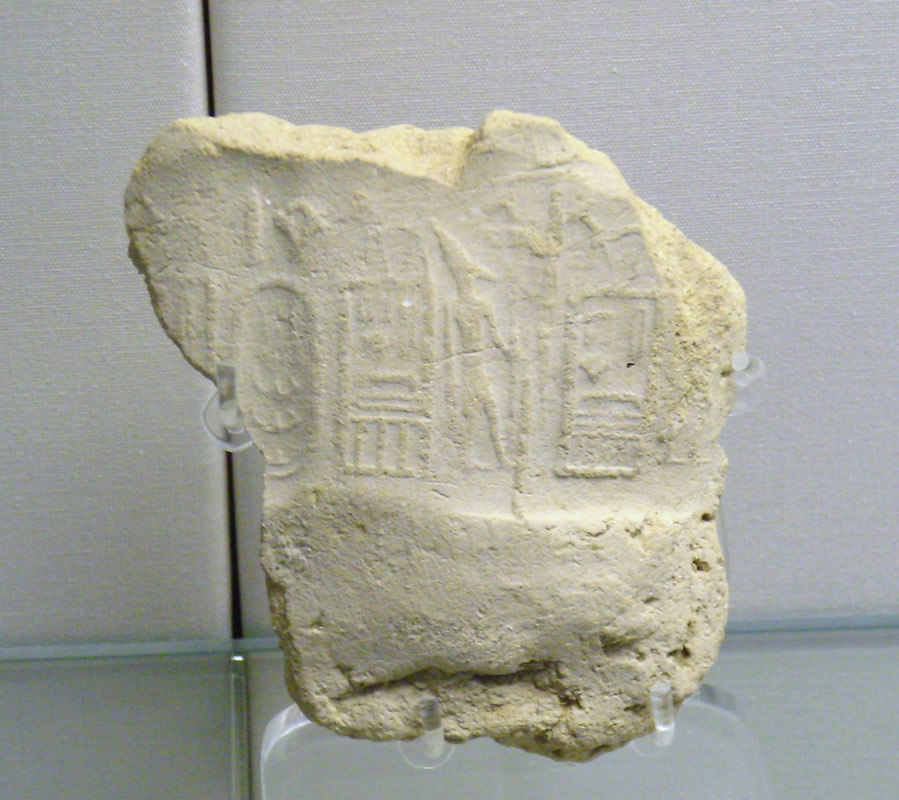
Seal impression of Seth-Peribsen, king of the Second Dynasty of Egypt. The oldest attested sentence is in Egyptian hieroglyphics.

In linguistics, attested languages are languages (living or dead) that have been documented and for which the evidence ("attestation") has survived to the present day. Evidence may be recordings, transcriptions, literature or inscriptions. In contrast, unattested languages may be purported languages for which no direct evidence exists, languages for which all evidence has been lost, or hypothetical proto-languages or substrate languages proposed in linguistic reconstruction.

Within an attested language, particular word forms directly known to have been used (because they appear in the literature, inscriptions or documented speech) are called attested forms. They contrast with unattested forms, which are reconstructions that may be hypothesised to have been used based on indirect evidence (such as etymological patterns). In linguistic texts, unattested forms are commonly marked with a preceding asterisk (*).

== See also ==
- Historical linguistics
- List of languages by first written accounts
- Spurious languages
