= Jean Baptiste Joseph, chevalier de Laumoy =

Jean Baptiste Joseph, chevalier de Laumoy (1750–1832) was a French Army engineer who fought in the American Revolutionary War and during the French Revolutionary Wars.

== Biography ==
De Laumoy was the son of a French infantry captain. He entered the French military engineering school in 1760. He was assigned to America in 1777 and on 17 November Laumoy was commissioned Colonel of Engineers; joining Washington's winter camp at Valley Forge. The French engineers, de Laumoy, Louis de la Radiere, and Louis Lebègue Duportail, provided knowledge of European fortifications and siege warfare.

Laumoy was deployed to the southern operations area on 8 February 1779; advising Benjamin Lincoln at Charleston to surrender given the inadequate fortifications. He accordingly was taken prisoner at the Siege of Charleston (on 12 May 1780) and was exchanged on 26 November 1782. Laumoy was breveted Brigadier General on 30 September 1783, and honorably discharged from the army the following month.

He returned to France in December 1783. On 4 July 1784 he was awarded the Order of Saint Louis, a distinction his father had also received. On 1 July 1785, Laumoy was made Aide maréchal général des logis at Saint-Domingue. Later, returning to France, he was Mestre de camp on 2 December 1787. For some months in 1788, he served on the army general staff. On 14 February 1789, he was second-in-command at Martinique, when the French suppressed a rebellion by island's large African slave and ex-slave population. As one of the hated administrators, Laumoy was obliged to return to France in May 1790.

For a while, Laumoy held a number of staff posts in the French Revolutionary Army. However, along with Gilbert du Motier, marquis de Lafayette, on whose staff ge servedm he was forced to flee in August 1792, and was captured by the Austrians at Rochefort, Belgium. Upon release he lived in exile in Holland, but escaped to America when Napoleon invaded The Netherlands. Laumoy lived in Philadelphia until he was removed from the émigré list. He returned to France in the summer of 1801. He retired in 1810, and died 19 January 1832.
