= Ittiwan people =

Historical Native American tribe in South Carolina, United States

Ittiwan
Total population
- Extinct as tribe (unknown) unknown (including those of ancestral descent)

Regions with significant populations
- South Carolina

Languages
- unattested, Cusaboan?

Religion
- Indigenous religion

Related ethnic groups
- possibly Cusabo

The Ittiwan people, also spelled Etiwan, were a Native American tribe, who lived near present-day Goose Creek. Sometimes they were referred to as Summerville Indians. They were located approximately 30 miles northeast of Charleston, South Carolina.

Members of the Wassamasaw Tribe of Varnertown Indians, a state-recognized tribe in South Carolina, claim descent from the Ittiwan among other historical tribes.

== Culture ==
=== Burial customs ===
In a letter written on February 1, 1710, the Anglican missionary Francis Le Jau wrote "Our Indian Neighbours call their Nation Ittiwan: when any of them dies they anoint him all over with Oyl, either of Bear or Ikkerry nuts for they have no other, thats' a constant practice and the Women's employment."

== Ceremony and dance ==
In a letter written on January 4, 1712, Le Jau described an Etiwan ceremony:

"40 of them trimd painted and dress'd in their fineryes Coming from the Woods near a little hut Supported upon Pillars all painted and adorned. There after a paus and a speech 3 young men holding one another under the Arms begun a Dance followed by the rest in a long train, & serpenting abt. sevl. times with pritty motion, Steps and figures, they had rattles for their Musick, and sung after a Pause onely four Notes saying the same again."

An elderly Etiwan man who was present at the ceremony explained to Le Jau that the three dancers who were holding each other's arms represented three men from whom all the other dancers were descended. He also explained that the little painted square hut represented a ship and Le Jau noted that the story reminded him of Noah's Ark, which he then shared with the Etiwan man.

In a separate letter written two years earlier Le Jau describes another dance which was done yearly and took place over the course of three days and three nights. The men would dance during the day while the women danced during the night. When Le Jau asked a man about the meaning of the dance he was told that it was to remember a time when man was without woman.

== History ==
=== 17th century ===
Historian William Ramsey referred to them as the Itewans and considered them to be part of the "settlement Indians" which were smaller people groups that lived surrounded by South Carolina plantations. In the 1670s these smaller nations had sought refuge from the powerful Westo nation by living among the colonists and relations seem to have continued on well enough that the Etiwan chose to side with the colonists again at the outset of the Yamasee War. Ramsey speculates that anti-Indian sentiments among the colonists may have grown to such a level during the first half of the war that relations with the Etiwan may have been shattered.

=== 18th century ===
At the outbreak of the Yamasee War in spring of 1715, the Etiwan sided with South Carolina and helped to defend Port Royal against the initial Yamasee offensive. By July of that year, however, the Etiwan switched sides and joined the Yamasee War effort against the South Carolinians.

In 1724, the journal of the Commons House of Assembly reported that the Etiwans wanted their own land. By then, the Etiwans were scattered in small groups in St. James Goose Creek Parishes, St. Thomas Parish, St. Johns Parish, St. Andrews, St. Paul Parish, and St. Helena Parish. Some Natives wanted a single settlement area to bring the tribe members together and provide a means of support for their dwindling number. The Commons House of Assembly granted the request and issued land on the western side of Wassamasaw Swamp. Governor Glen makes the last historical mention of them as a tribal nation in 1751, as he proclaimed the "Etavans [sic] as a tribe in alliance with the English Government."
