= Carolina Piedmont Railroad =

Class III railroad in South Carolina

Overview
- Headquarters: Laurens, South Carolina
- Reporting mark: CPDR
- Locale: Upstate South Carolina
- Dates of operation: 1990–present
- Predecessor: CSX Transportation

Technical
- Track gauge: 4 ft 8 1/2 in (1,435 mm) standard gauge
- Length: 34 miles (55 km)

The Carolina Piedmont Railroad (reporting mark CPDR) is an American class III railroad and subsidiary of Genesee & Wyoming Inc. operating in the Upstate region of South Carolina. From an interchange with CSX Transportation at Laurens the railroad runs 34 miles (55 km) to the northwest, terminating at East Greenville.

Primary commodities include plastic resins, gas turbines, wind turbines, food products, forest products, and chemicals with the railroad accumulating about 5,500 annual carloads in 2008. The railroad serves a General Electric facility that provides a source of high value cargo for the line, shipping several gas and wind turbines via rail on an as needed basis.

== History ==
What is now the Carolina Piedmont railroad began as the Greenville and Laurens Railroad, which was chartered in 1878 and arrived in Greenville in 1882. The railroad was later merged with three others in the region to form the Port Royal and Western Carolina Railway in October 1886. In 1896, the railroad was merged, this time with the Port Royal and Augusta Railway to create the Charleston and Western Carolina Railway, and was promptly acquired by the Atlantic Coast Line in 1897.

Additional mergers came in 1959, as the Charleston & Western Carolina was formally merged into the Atlantic Coast Line. The ACL was merged into the Seaboard Coast Line in 1967, and the SCL was merged into the Seaboard System in 1983. The final merger came in 1986, when the Seaboard System was merged into CSX Transportation.

=== Shortline service begins ===
Annual carloads amounted to about 8,000 in 1988, which prompted CSX to sell the portion from Laurens to a point short of downtown Greenville to the Carolina Piedmont Railroad on November 5, 1990. A key factor in the sale was that the line could not support intermodal or automotive shipments on account of low clearances. The railroad was operated as a division of the South Carolina Central Railroad, a subsidiary of RailTex. For the year 1995, about 6,000 annual carloads originated or terminated on the line.

=== Expansion and acquisition ===
In April 1997, the railroad acquired the Greenville and Northern Railway, running from Greenville to Travelers Rest for a distance of 11.8 miles (19.0 km). The G&N was slated for abandonment, along with 3.2 miles (5.1 km) of track located at the end of the Carolina Piedmont near the Greenville Downtown Airport. However, on May 28, 1999, the railroad reached an agreement with the Greenville County Economic Development Corporation (GCEDC) to purchase both sections in their entirety. The Greenville & Northern was converted into the Swamp Rabbit Trail walking trail after the GCEDC failed to find a new operator, while the southern portion was operated by the Carolina Piedmont under contract by the GCEDC and is primarily used for railcar storage.

An additional change came in 2000 as the South Carolina Central's parent company, RailTex, was purchased by RailAmerica. Around the same time the railroad teamed with General Electric to upgrade rail infrastructure in order to accommodate heavy turbine loads originating from the Greenville facility. Heavier rail was installed, and significant upgrades to the ballast and roadbed were made.

The railroad continued to operate under RailAmerica, hauling 5,529 annual carloads in 2008. until December, 2012 when RailAmerica was absorbed into the competitor Genesee & Wyoming company.

== The current CPDR ==
=== Locomotive roster ===
CPDR currently owns 4 locomotives, all of which being some variant of the EMD GP38-2 Locomotive.

CPDR GP38-2 2079: Build Date: 11/79: Ex-CPDR 3881 < CFE 3881 < NREX 3881 < née CNW 4613.

CPDR GP38-2 2007: Build Date: 9/69: Ex-CPDR 3899, [GMTX 2659] < LLPX 2740 < NS 2740 < née Sou GP38 2740.

CPDR GP38-2 2149: Build Date: 10/74: Ex-NS 5158 < née CG/Sou 5158.

GC (Georgia Central) GP38-3 2140: Build Date: 8/75: Ex NS 5171 < nee SOU 5171.

=== Day to day operations ===
Day Crew goes On Duty Monday thru Friday at Laurens Yard at 0:700. Begins building its train anywhere from 09:45 to 10:00, and has usually left by 11:00. The crew will then spend the rest of their day working local industries between Laurens and East Greenville, where they will run around their train to head south. After working a few more industries on the way south, the crew will tie down the train at Cryovac in Simpsonville and taxi back to their Depot in Laurens.

Night Crew goes On Duty Monday thru Friday at Laurens Yard at 19:00. Crew taxis to the train the Day Crew tied down at Cryovac earlier, and begins to work the Cryovac Lead. After finishing at Cryovac, the train will proceed southbound to Laurens Yard, working more local industries along the way. Once arriving in Laurens Yard, they will put their cars in the proper tracks and tie down the locomotives next to the Depot.

GE Turbine Specials run as needed. The On Duty times vary but the crew always starts at Laurens Yard. Depending on if the Turbine is going in or out of the plant, the crew can do one or two things. They can either pick up the Turbine if it’s in Laurens Yard and drop it off at the GE Plant in Greenville and running back to Laurens, or do the opposite by running to the GE Plant and picking the Turbine up. The crew may also do any extra work along with their Turbine related duties.

CPDR Operates on AAR Channel 44 - 160.77000 MHz.

== See also ==
- Greenville and Laurens Railroad
- RailAmerica
