= Savannah Valley Railroad =

The Savannah Valley Railroad was a railroad company in the U.S. state of Georgia in the early 1880s. It was merged by its lessor, the Port Royal and Augusta Railway, with the Augusta and Knoxville Railroad, Greenwood, Laurens and Spartanburg Railroad and the Greenville and Laurens Railroad into the Port Royal and Western Carolina Railway on October 27, 1886.
