= Spartanburg Subdivision =

Railway line in South Carolina

The Spartanburg Subdivision is a railroad line owned by CSX Transportation in the U.S. state of South Carolina. The line runs from Spartanburg, South Carolina, to Greenwood, South Carolina, for a total of 61.8 miles (99.5 km). At its north end the line continues north on the Blue Ridge Subdivision and at its south end the line continues south as the Monroe Subdivision.

== History ==
The Spartanburg Subdivision was built in 1885 by the Greenwood, Laurens and Spartanburg Railroad. The line, along with the Augusta and Knoxville Railroad, was merged into the Port Royal and Western Carolina Railway in 1886. The Port Royal and Western Carolina Railway was operated as part of the Central of Georgia Railroad line until the South Carolina General Assembly forced the railroad to give up the lines. The Charleston and Western Carolina Railway was formed in 1896 to operate the two lines.

The Atlantic Coast Line Railroad took over the Charleston and Western Carolina Railway in 1897 but operated it as a subsidiary until 1959 when it was fully absorbed by the Atlantic Coast Line.

The Atlantic Coast Line became the Seaboard Coast Line Railroad (SCL) in 1967 after merging with their rival, the Seaboard Air Line Railroad (SAL). The Seaboard Coast Line designated the line as the Spartanburg Subdivision from Spartanburg to Augusta, Georgia.

In 1980, the Seaboard Coast Line's parent company merged with the Chessie System, creating the CSX Corporation. The CSX Corporation initially operated the Chessie and Seaboard Systems separately until 1986, when they were merged into CSX Transportation. Track south of Greenwood to Augusta was split off from the Spartanburg Subdivision and became the McCormick Subdivision in the early years following the creation of CSX.

== See also ==
- List of CSX Transportation lines
