= McCormick Subdivision =

Railway line in Georgia and South Carolina

The McCormick Subdivision is a railroad line owned and operated by CSX Transportation in the U.S. states of Georgia and South Carolina. The line runs from Augusta, Georgia, to Greenwood, South Carolina, for a distance of 62.8 miles (101.1 km). At its south end the line continues north from the Augusta Subdivision and at its north end the line continues north as the Monroe Subdivision.

== History ==
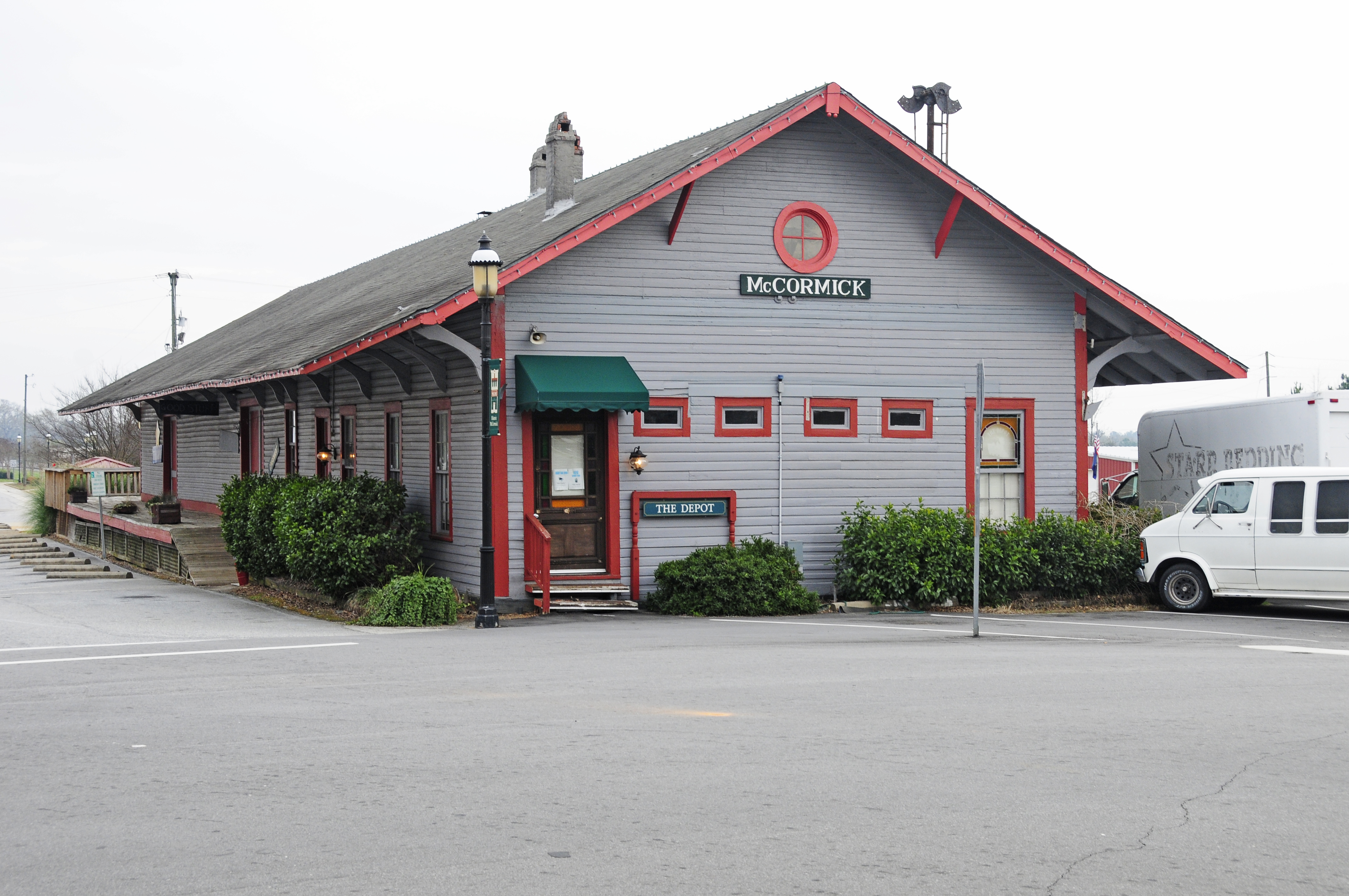
former McCormick station

The route from Augusta to Greenwood was constructed by the Augusta and Knoxville Railroad in 1882. In 1886 it became part of the Port Royal and Western Carolina Railway and was later reorganized as the Charleston and Western Carolina Railway (C&WC) in 1896. The C&WC was later absorbed by the Atlantic Coast Line Railroad and passed through two more successor railroads, the Seaboard Coast Line and Seaboard System before finally being merged into CSX Transportation in 1986.

The line was originally part of the larger Spartanburg Subdivision under the Seaboard Coast Line. The McCormick Subdivision was created by splitting the Spartanburg Subdivision in the early years following the creation of CSX.
