= Greenwood, Laurens and Spartanburg Railroad =

Historical US company

The Greenwood, Laurens and Spartanburg Railroad was a South Carolina railroad company begun after Reconstruction.

The Greenwood, Laurens and Spartanburg was chartered by the South Carolina General Assembly in 1880.

In 1884 the Central Railroad of Georgia purchased the Greenwood, Laurens and Spartanburg prior to the route being completed.

In 1886, the line was merged under the Port Royal and Western Carolina Railway name through a consolidation of the Augusta and Knoxville Railroad, the Savannah Valley Railroad and the Greenville and Laurens Railroad, which then joined with Port Royal and Augusta Railway.

The Port Royal and Western Carolina, and Port Royal and Augusta were operated as part of the Central of Georgia Railroad line until the S.C. General Assembly forced the railroad to give up the lines. The Charleston and Western Carolina Railway was formed in 1896 to operate the pair.

The Atlantic Coast Line Railroad took over the Charleston and Western Carolina in 1897.
