= Charleston Area Regional Transportation Authority =

Public transit service in South Carolina, US

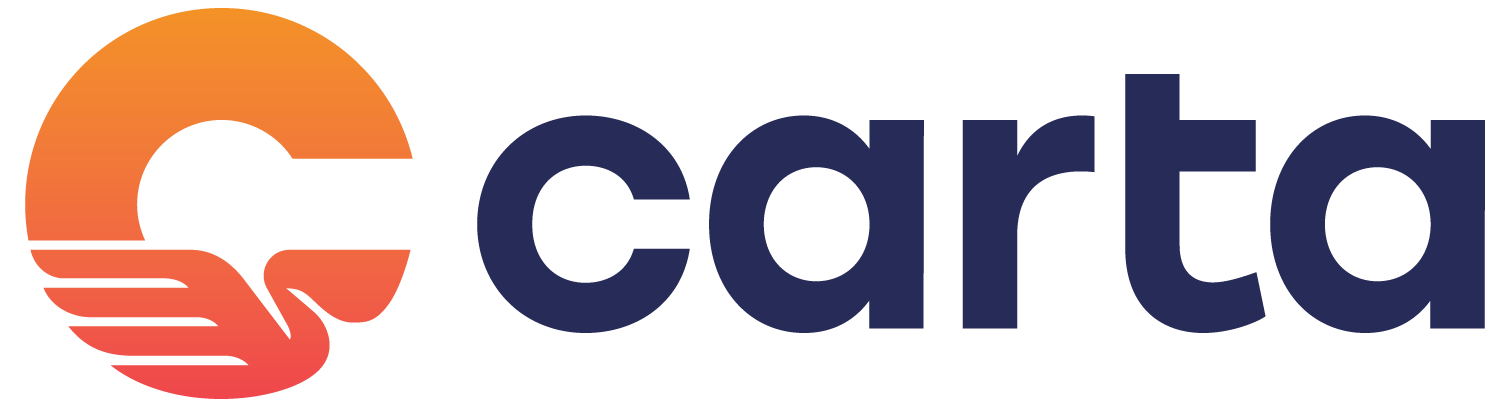

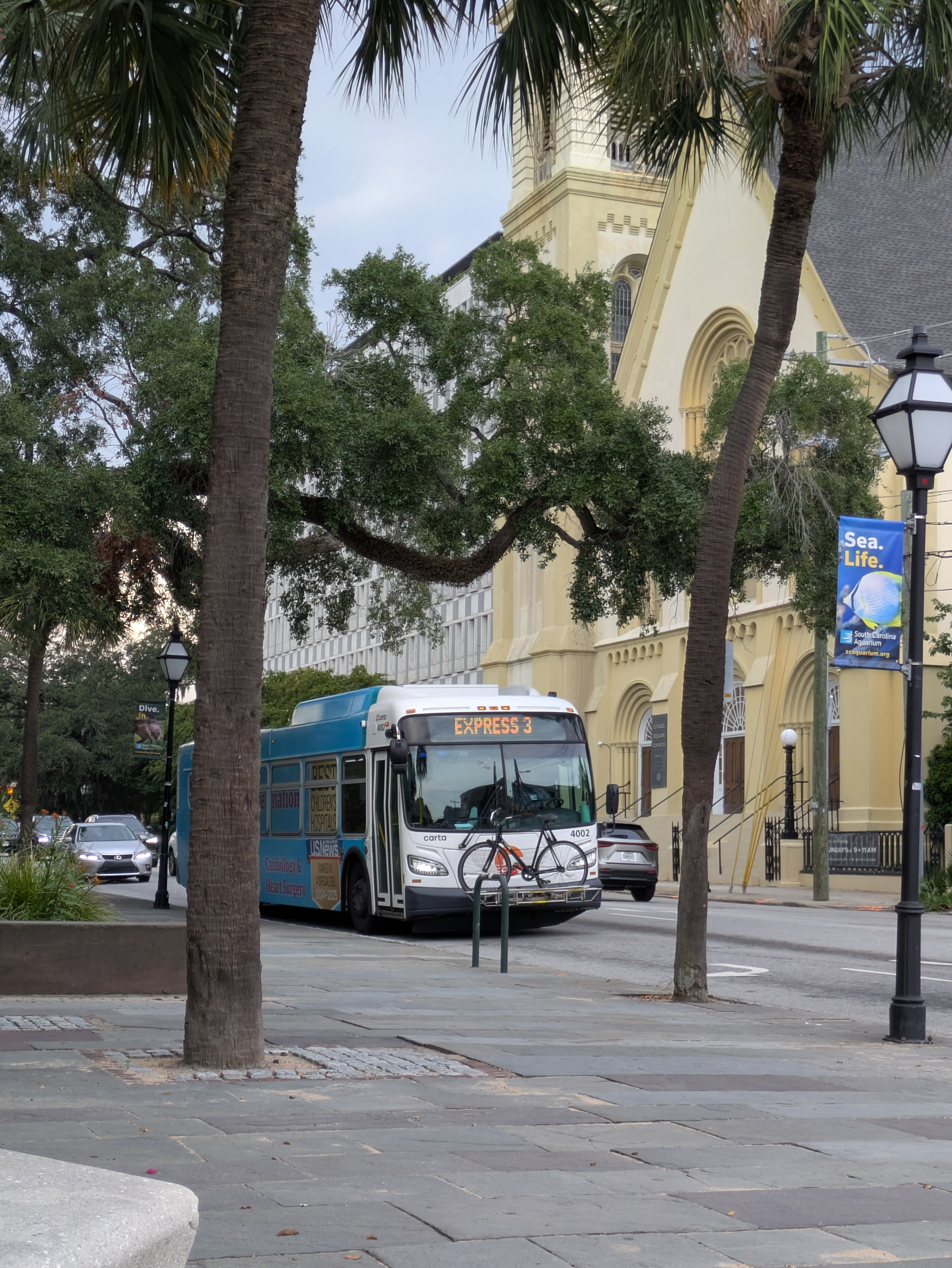
- A CARTA bus, on the route Express 3, in front of Citadel Square Baptist Church
- Founded: 1997
- Headquarters: 3664 Leeds Avenue; North Charleston, SC 29405
- Service area: Charleston County; Dorchester County
- Service type: Bus service, dial-a-bus, express bus service
- Routes: 17 fixed routes 3 express routes 3 free shuttle routes (DASH)
- Hubs: Charleston Visitors Center/Mary Street; North Charleston Superstop; Citadel Mall; Tanger Outlets Charleston
- Daily ridership: 9,100 (weekdays, Q1 2026)
- Annual ridership: 2,513,400 (2025)
- Fuel type: Diesel, electric
- Operator: RATP Dev
- Website: ridecarta.com

The Charleston Area Regional Transportation Authority (CARTA) provides public transportation within parts of Charleston and Dorchester counties in South Carolina, including the municipalities of Charleston, North Charleston, Mount Pleasant, Summerville, James Island, and the Isle of Palms. CARTA presently contracts with RATP Dev for staffing and managing the bus drivers in addition to maintaining and scheduling the buses. In 2025, the system had a ridership of 2,513,400, or about 9,100 per weekday as of the first quarter of 2026.

CARTA began service in 1997 and operates seven days a week. In addition to its regular fixed routes, CARTA offers express commuter service on weekdays, a free area shuttle service in downtown Charleston, and Tel-A-Ride services for eligible residents.

== History ==
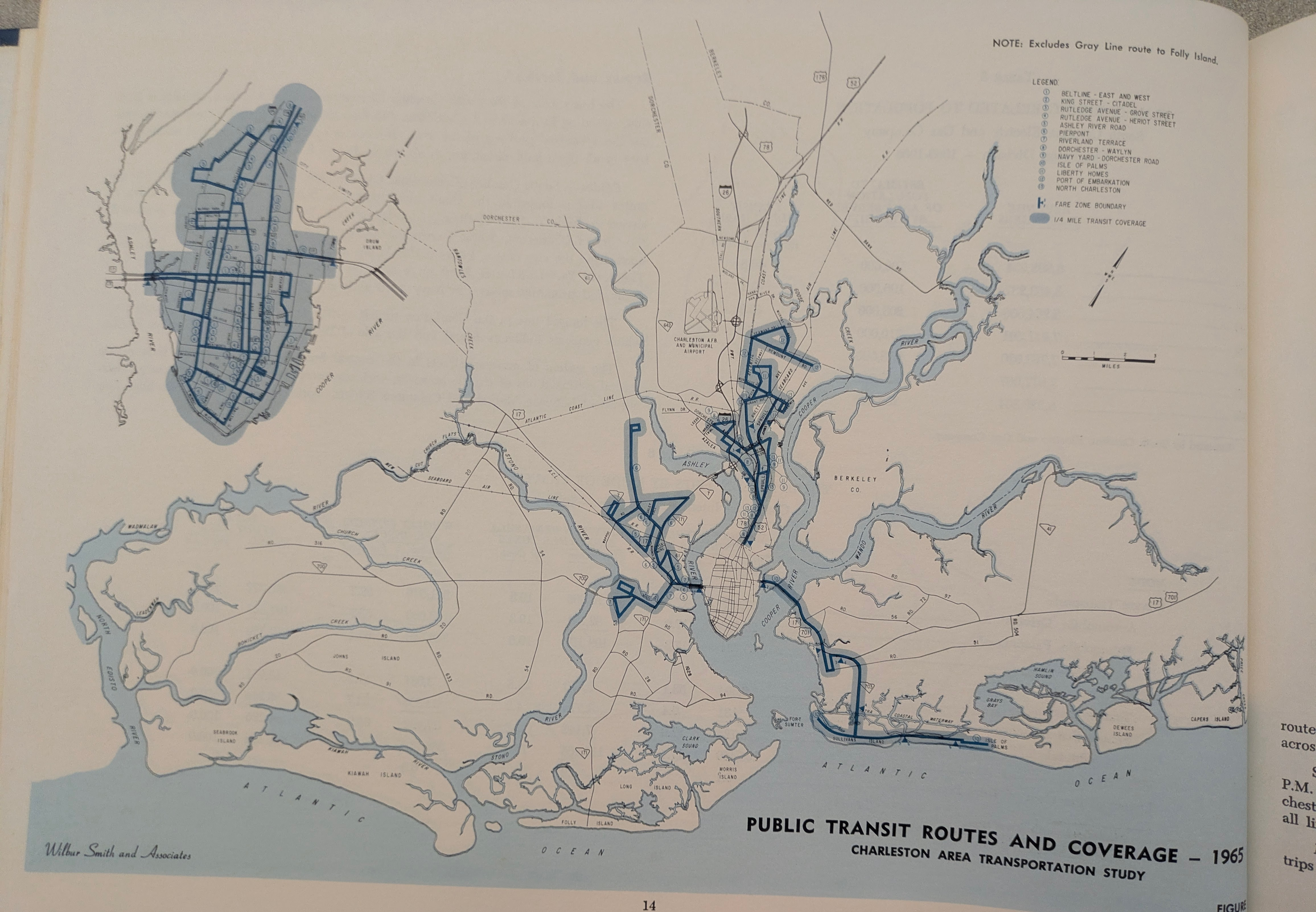
Bus routes in Charleston in 1965, when SCE&G ran the system

As with many communities across the United States, Charleston was served by streetcars that were operated by electric companies. Charleston's streetcar system was operated by the South Carolina Power Company, a predecessor of the South Carolina Electric & Gas Company (SCE&G). Charleston's streetcars ran until 1938, when they were replaced with buses. The switch to buses was widely viewed as a modernization of the transit system at the time; the president of the South Carolina Power Company argued that buses were "faster, more comfortable, and easily adjustable to emergencies" compared to streetcars.

Over the next few decades, SCE&G sought to reduce bus service and divest itself from the bus system. This culminated in negotiations between SCE&G and the City of Charleston in 1996 to transfer responsibility for the bus system to the city. In 1997, the City of Charleston, the City of North Charleston, the Town of Mount Pleasant and Charleston County joined together to create the Charleston Area Regional Transportation Authority (CARTA) as a formal political entity.

As part of the negotiations between SCE&G and the City of Charleston, SCE&G was to pay for the operation of the CARTA system for seven years. During this time, CARTA struggled to find new sources of funding to replace SCE&G's funding. A series of half-cent sales tax proposals, which would have provided funding to CARTA, were proposed but shot down in 2000 and 2002. As a result, CARTA was forced to reduce service in October 2002 and cease most of its operations in January 2004; during this time, it relied on emergency funding from state and federal funding streams to keep it from being liquidated. In early November 2004, a new half-cent sales tax referendum was passed, providing CARTA with the revenue to relaunch many of the services that were eliminated or consolidated due to insufficient funding. CARTA even added new routes and services throughout their rebuilding phases, as was the case with the launch of CARTA Express in January 2007.

From 2004 onwards, CARTA's ridership increased year-over-year. In 2012, CARTA reported its busiest year of operations, with nearly five million riders and a weekday average of over 15,000 riders.

== Organization ==
CARTA is overseen by a board of directors made up of area politicians who meet once a month. Their meeting agendas and meeting minutes are available online. These meetings typically review CARTA's financial details, staff updates, and performance/ridership updates.

The day-to-day operations of CARTA are managed by the Berkeley-Charleston-Dorchester Council of Governments (BCDCOG), which took over operations in 2015. The BCDCOG also manages the rural TriCounty Link and Lowcountry Rapid Transit projects.

The BCDCOG contracts the day-to-day operations of CARTA to a private company. CARTA is de-facto required to do this because of state law. CARTA's bus drivers are unionized, but governmental entities in South Carolina are not allowed to enter into collective bargaining with unionized workers. The BCDCOG solves this problem by contracting out service to a private company, which enters into collective bargaining instead. As of February 2026, RATP Dev is the contractor that runs the day-to-day operations of CARTA.

CARTA is funded primarily by federal transit funds and the Charleston County transportation sales tax. In the 2024 fiscal year, CARTA had an operations budget of $28,029,794, of which 45% was funded by the sales tax and 36% was federally funded.

CARTA funding sources, FFY 2024
Source of funding	Funding amount	% of total
Charleston County sales tax	$12,742,317	45%
Federal funds	$10,168,383	36%
Farebox revenue	$1,327,285	5%
Miscellaneous	$3,791,819	13%
Total funding	$28,029,794	

== Services ==
CARTA system map from 2022

=== Fixed routes ===
CARTA offers fixed route services to much of the Charleston area, mainly in downtown, North Charleston, West Ashley, and Mount Pleasant. Routes are serviced by large passenger buses which typically have two entrances, wheelchair usability, and a bike rack on the front of the vehicle with space for two bikes.

These are the fixed routes as of March 2026:

- Route 10 – Rivers Avenue
- Route 11 – Dorchester/Airport
- Route 12 – Upper Dorchester/AFB
- Route 13 – Remount Road
- Route 20 – King Street/Meeting
- Route 30 – Savannah Highway
- Route 31 – Folly Road
- Route 32 – North Bridge
- Route 33 – St Andrews/Ashley River Rd
- Route 40 – Mt. Pleasant
- Route 41 – Coleman Boulevard
- Route 42 – Wando Circulator
- Route 102 – North Neck
- Route 103 – Leeds Avenue
- Route 104 – Montague Avenue
- Route 203 – Medical Shuttle
- Route 301 – Glenn McConnell Connector

Regular adult bus fares are $2.00 per trip and transfers are free. Special fares are available for senior citizens, staff, faculty and students. Children aged six and younger ride for free when they are accompanied by a paying passenger. Students in grades K-12 ride free (school I.D. cards are encouraged).

Seniors aged 55 years and older pay $1.00 for Fixed Route and Express services Drivers may request proof of age (Medicare cards or an I.D. card with date of birth will be accepted).

Disabled patrons or passengers with a valid Tel-A-Ride I.D. card can ride fixed route services for free every day, all day.

=== CARTA Express ===
CARTA Express is a commuter-style service with limited stops which provide service from the suburbs to downtown Charleston. CARTA Express buses are full-sized commuter-style buses with reclining, upholstered “airline-style” seats, reading lights and overhead luggage racks. The fare for any Express route is $3.50 per one-way ride; most riders board for free using an MUSC ID or College of Charleston ID.

As of March 2026, there are three active CARTA Express routes:

- Express 1 – North Charleston/James Island
- Express 2 – West Ashley/Mount Pleasant
- Express 3 – Dorchester Rd/Summerville

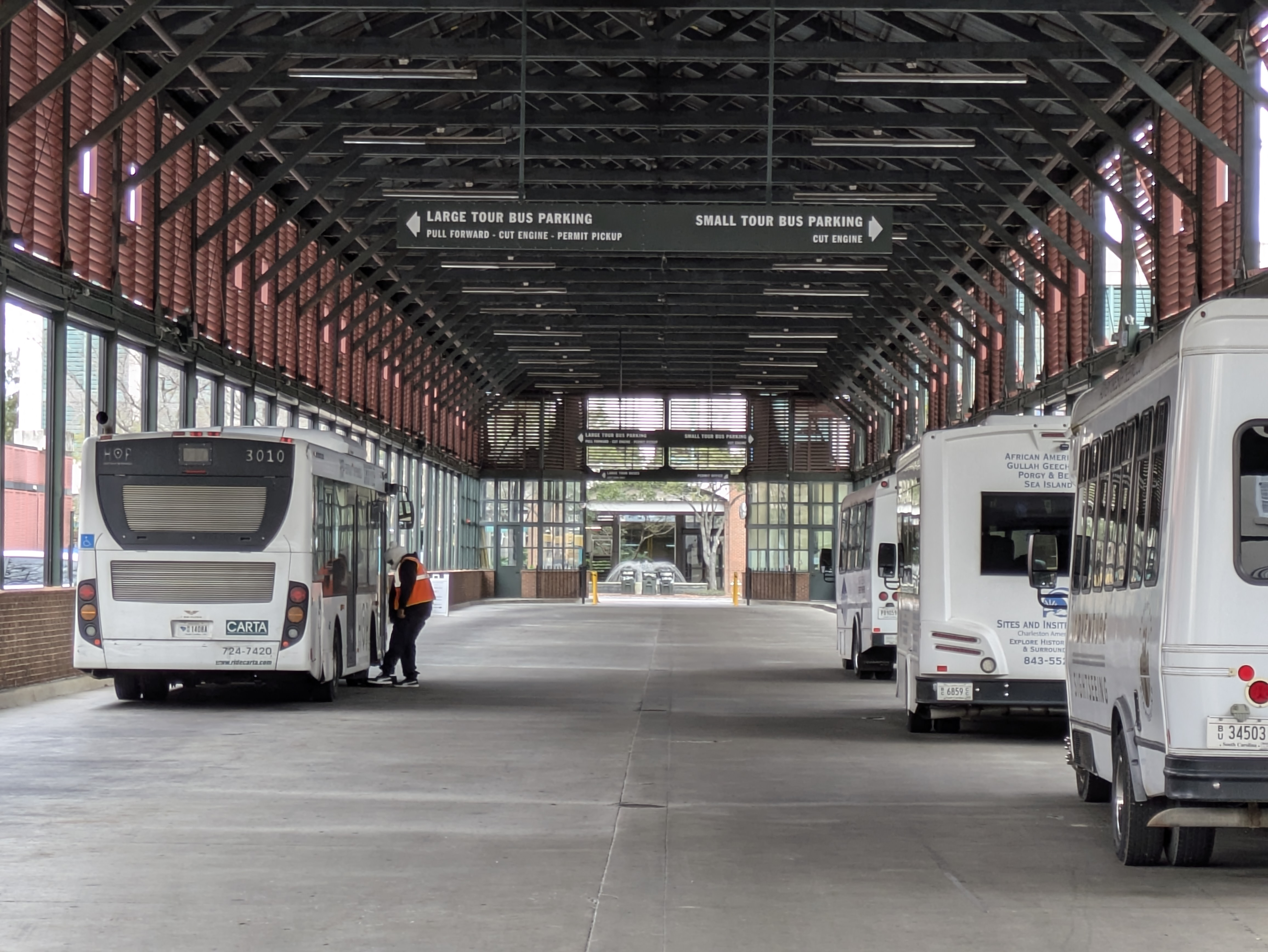
The Howard Chapman Bus Shed, located next to the Charleston Visitor Center, acts as a transfer point for all three DASH routes as well as a layover point for bus drivers.

=== DASH service ===
The Downtown Area Shuttle (or DASH) is a group of free routes which run in the downtown area. DASH services began in 1978 with the help of a federal grant.

- Route 210 – CofC/Aquarium DASH
- Route 211 – Meeting/King DASH
- Route 213 – Lockwood/Calhoun DASH

=== CARTA Tel-A-Ride ===
If passengers are unable to get to a bus, Tel-A-Ride comes to them within a defined Tel-A-Ride Service area. Curbside service is available for those who meet the requirements for the Americans with Disabilities Act. Smaller “neighborhood” buses are used for the CARTA Tel-A-Ride service offering both single-door entry and wheelchair accessibility.

Tel-A-Ride fares are $4.00 per trip.

=== Beach Reach Shuttle ===
The Beach Reach Shuttle is a seasonal route operated between the Mount Pleasant Towne Centre and the Isle of Palms. It provides free service on the weekends during the summer tourist season. The service was launched in 2021 to provide easier public access to local beaches while reducing traffic congestion and parking demand on Isle of Palms. Funding for the route is split three ways between CARTA, the Town of Mount Pleasant, and the City of Isle of Palms. The service has been criticized for high costs-per-rider and low ridership.

=== Defunct services ===
CARTA@Night was a late-night bus service implemented to take passengers to any stop within four designated “zones” after most regular bus service had ended. This service was discontinued in December 2010 due to budget problems.

The North Area Shuttle (or NASH) was a bus route that connected visitors with attractions in North Charleston, including Park Circle, the Tanger Outlet Center, the North Charleston Visitors Center, the North Charleston Coliseum, and the North Charleston Performing Arts Center. The service was cancelled in June 2014 due to low ridership.

== See also ==
- North Charleston Intermodal Transportation Center
- Lowcountry Rapid Transit
- Best Friend of Charleston
