= Augusta and Knoxville Railroad =

Overview
- Locale: Georgia and South Carolina, USA
- Dates of operation: 1877 (chartered); 1882–1886
- Successor: Port Royal and Western Carolina Railway

Technical
- Length: 68 mi (109 km)

The Augusta and Knoxville Railroad (A&K) was a railroad company that operated on 66 miles (106 km) of track between Augusta, Georgia, and Greenwood, South Carolina, from 1882 to 1886. It was merged with three other companies to form the Port Royal and Western Carolina Railway, which was reorganized in 1896 as the Charleston and Western Carolina Railway.

== History ==
The company was chartered in 1877 to connect its namesake cities, and was incorporated on February 3, 1880. Patrick H. Bradley served as president until the incorporation, at which time he stepped down citing poor health to become vice president. Eugene F. Verdery was appointed president at the incorporation meeting, and the interests of the elected board of directors were split with ten directors from Georgia and six directors from South Carolina. (Note: Verdery was also courted to be president of the Greenwood and Spartanburg Railroad in 1881.) Bonds were issued for the railroad's construction, including a separate $50,000 bond to build a bridge over the Savannah River.

The line that they would eventually complete was started by the Greenwood and Augusta Railroad (G&A), which was chartered in 1873 and began construction in August 1877; the G&A was incorporated into and became a branch of the Augusta, Knoxville and Greenwood Railroad (AK&G) in May 1877, then the AK&G was consolidated into the A&K in 1880. The AK&G acquisition increased the graded right-of-way total to 51 miles (82 km). In 1881, the Charlotte, Columbia and Augusta Railroad tried to gain a controlling interest in the A&K in an effort to prevent competition from the Baltimore and Ohio Railroad (B&O). Many of the shares of the A&K were held by the city of Augusta, which was reluctant to sell to them and to several other bidders including the Virginia Midland Railroad, Richmond and Danville Railroad and the Plant System. The B&O themselves also made an offer to take control of the A&K which would help them complete construction of the entire line connecting to Spartanburg, but the A&K board of directors declined. The first train ran from Augusta 45 miles (72 km) to Dorrs Mines on January 8, 1882. The full A&K line was officially opened with a ceremonial first train on April 28, 1882, (Note: Some reports written in the 20th century state that the opening occurred in 1884.) the track stretching 68 miles (109 km) between Augusta, Georgia, and Greenwood, South Carolina. Regularly scheduled passenger trains began serving the line on May 15, 1882.

The A&K was leased to the Port Royal and Augusta Railway in September 1883. In 1886, bondholders brought suit to set aside the lease, and on October 27, 1886, the A&K was merged with the Greenwood, Laurens and Spartanburg Railroad, Greenville and Laurens Railroad and the Savannah Valley Railroad to form the Port Royal and Western Carolina Railway (PR&WC). Verdery continued his employment with the line, serving on the PR&WC board of directors. The PR&WC was reorganized in 1896 as the Charleston and Western Carolina Railway.
