= Lowcountry Lowline =

Park in Charleston, South Carolina, United States

- Interactive map of Lowcountry Lowline
- Type: Linear Park
- Location: Charleston, South Carolina, U.S.
- Coordinates: 32°47′49″N 79°56′35″W
- Area: Linear 1.7 mile (2.73 km) stretch

The Lowcountry Lowline is a planned linear park in Charleston, South Carolina that will be located on 1.7 miles of old railroad roadbed. It will run from Mt. Pleasant Street to Courtland Street.

The park was first proposed in 2015 by a nonprofit group, the Friends of the Lowcountry Lowline (FLL). The FLL has already done much of the planning for the park. However, in 2022, Charleston city officials were awarded a $7 million grant from the federal grant to be used exclusively for planning purposes. As of August 2024, city officials have not used any portion of that grant because if they do, federal planning requirements will add approximately 3 to 5 years to the park's construction timeline.

According to Logan McVey, the current chief policy officer to Charleston's mayor, William S. Cogswell Jr., the park "has been on the shelf for so long that people aren't sure it's ever going to happen." Nonetheless, in 2024, city officials visited Atlanta to meet with representatives of the nonprofit that helped build the Atlanta Beltline to learn how they did so. The FLL is currently advocating for phased construction of the park.

== History and development ==
=== History of the line ===
Completed in the early-1830s, the line was originally part of the South Carolina Canal and Rail Road Company. The railroad operated the first regular trains pulled by steam locomotives in the United States. During the American Civil War, the successor company (South Carolina Rail Road) maintained the supply line into the city's downtown. Some contextually important railroad and warehouse buildings still exist.

=== Establishing a park ===
In 2015, the Friends of the Lowcountry Lowline (FLL) reached an agreement with Norfolk Southern to purchase 1.7 miles of land along the ridge of Charleston's peninsula within two years. The former railroad right-of-way had existed in Charleston since the 1820s but hadn't been used for over a decade. In 2017, Norfolk Southern and the city of Charleston met the terms of the agreement at a price of $4.6 million which was significantly below previous cost estimates. The city also purchased two additional properties adjacent to the former railroad line from Norfolk Southern which may be used for affordable housing units. In May 2018, work began to remove the land's abandoned rails and switches.

When completed, the Lowcountry Lowline will be downtown Charleston's second largest park. It will consist of pedestrian and bicycle paths along the peninsula's ridge. It will also be a flood management project that will have a "wetland park" to be a reservoir for storm water. The project is often compared to the New York City High Line or Atlanta's fledgling Beltline.

The Lowline is expected to cost $30 million to complete. It is expected that the park will be constructed over the next decade in phases. A study conducted in 2016 estimated that after twenty years of operation the Lowline will have an estimated economic impact in Charleston of $4.8 billion. Community feedback was sought by the Friends of the Lowcountry in February 2020 after the release of the park's conceptual study. In early 2021, preliminary funding of the park began. The Charleston City Council voted in April, 2021, to spend $250,000 to help the Friends of the Lowcountry Lowline design and plan the park. Several council members representing portions of West Ashley expressed concern about allocating money to a private entity such as FLL.

In 2021, the city announced it was looking to spend $4 million on the Lowline to help complete the first phase from Line Street to Huger Street due to the development the line is expected to spur. City council members believe that funding the Lowline now will increase tax revenues in the special tax district in which it sits. The increase in tax revenue would then allow the city to make stormwater upgrades in other parts of the city, particular the eastern portion of the Charleston peninsula.

The project secured $10 million in funding in 2022, which consisted of $7 million in federal grants and $3 million in city funding. The Friends of the Lowcountry will use the funding, in part, for community engagement and strategy. Moreover, because the park will run along a prior Norfolk Southern rail line, and that company along with other rail lines historically used arsenical herbicides to slow plant growth along rail lines, a National Environmental Protection Act review will have to be conducted. In 2011, the average amount of time it took public projects to complete the NEPA review process was longer than six years.

== Features of the park ==
=== Water management ===
The city of Charleston has long had issues with flooding and the Lowline is believed to be capable of alleviating storm runoff in some areas of the city. One park proposed for the Lowline is the Newmarket Park which would be a "storm water wetland" that would create an outlet for the nearby New Market Creek. Additionally, the proposed Poinsette Park would be a large, open space capable of holding water. The conceptual study for the Lowline states that capturing and treating "all runoff created by the elevated roadways" is a priority of the project. Plants on the Lowline will be native to the area and a key component of the park's water management function.

=== Transportation ===
Charleston has also had issues with cyclist safety. In Charleston's first ever bicycle infrastructure study, the Lowline was the central component on the plan for a "robust urban bikeway system" on the peninsula. The bikeway down the Lowline will have two 6-foot wide lanes at the minimum, separated by a median and with designated crossings. Additionally, the Lowcountry Rapid Transit System could possibly have a transit hub near the Lowline on Mt. Pleasant Street and the city is looking to build affordable housing units on F and H streets. The planned pedestrian bridge over the Ashley River connecting the West Ashley Greenway to downtown Charleston may eventually connect with the Lowline.

== See also ==
- Conceptual Plan of the Lowcountry Lowline
