= Augusta Subdivision =

CSX railroad line in the United States of America

The Augusta Subdivision is a railroad line owned by CSX Transportation in the U.S. states of Georgia and South Carolina. The line runs from CSX's A Line at Yemassee, South Carolina to Augusta, Georgia, for a total of 87.7 miles (141.1 km). At its north end it connects with Norfolk Southern Railway and CSX's McCormick Subdivision.

== History ==
Track of the Augusta Subdivision was built in 1873 by the Port Royal Railroad. That same year, the company declared bankruptcy and the line was sold to the new Port Royal and Augusta Railway in 1878.

The Port Royal and Augusta Railway was operated as part of the Central of Georgia Railroad line until the South Carolina General Assembly forced the railroad to give up the lines. The Port Royal and Augusta Railroad became part of the Charleston and Western Carolina Railway in 1896.

The Atlantic Coast Line Railroad (ACL) took over the Charleston and Western Carolina Railway in 1897 but operated it as a subsidiary until 1959 when it was fully absorbed by the Atlantic Coast Line.

The Atlantic Coast Line became the Seaboard Coast Line Railroad (SCL) in 1967 after merging with their rival, the Seaboard Air Line Railroad (SAL). Under the Seaboard Coast Line's ownership, the line was designated as the Augusta Subdivision from Augusta to Robbins (which continued north to Florence, South Carolina along what was previously the ACL's Florence—Robbins Line). Track from Robbins to Yemassee was known as the Robbins Subdivision at the time. After track from Robbins north to Cope was severed in the 1980s, the Robbins Subdivision designation was retired and the Augusta Subdivision was used for the full line from Augusta to Yemassee as it is today. What remains of the former Augusta Subdivision north of Cope is now part of the Orangeburg Subdivision.

In 1980, the Seaboard Coast Line's parent company merged with the Chessie System, creating the CSX Corporation. The CSX Corporation initially operated the Chessie and Seaboard Systems separately until 1986, when they were merged into CSX Transportation who operates the Augusta Subdivision today.

== See also ==
- List of CSX Transportation lines
- Port Royal and Augusta Railway
