= North Charleston station =

Train station in South Carolina, United States

North Charleston Intermodal Transportation Center

General information
- Location: 4565 Gaynor Avenue; North Charleston, South Carolina; United States
- Coordinates: 32°52′29″N 79°59′53″W
- Owner: City of North Charleston
- Line: Charleston Subdivision
- Platforms: 1 side platform
- Tracks: 2
- Bus stands: 2
- Bus operators: CARTA; Southeastern Stages

Construction
- Structure type: At-grade
- Accessible: Yes
- Architect: Davis & Floyd, Inc.

Other information
- Station code: Amtrak: CHS

History
- Opened: December 13, 2018

Passengers
- FY 2025: 72,042 (Amtrak)

Services
Preceding station	Amtrak	Following station
Yemassee toward Savannah	Palmetto	Kingstree toward New York
Yemassee toward Miami	Silver Meteor	Kingstree toward New York
Auto Train does not stop here
Former services
Preceding station	Atlantic Coast Line Railroad	Following station
Ravenel toward Tampa	Main Line	Monks Corner toward Richmond
Location

The North Charleston Intermodal Transportation Center is an intermodal transit station in North Charleston, South Carolina, United States. It serves as the Amtrak train station for the Greater Charleston area as well as a bus terminus for the Charleston Area Regional Transportation Authority (CARTA) and Southeastern Stages, a regional intercity bus common carrier. The street address is 4565 Gaynor Avenue, and is located in the Liberty Hill neighborhood. The station appears in Amtrak timetables as Charleston.

== Layout ==
The nearly 15,000-square-foot (1,400 m^{2}) single-story station is constructed in brown brick and textured concrete masonry units, with stylized pilasters that visually break up the long, horizontal facades. At one end is a tower, while a projecting bay with triangular parapet and clock face marks the main entrance. A network of canopies protect travelers from inclement weather as they arrive or depart by car, bus or rail. The steeply pitched, hipped seamed-metal roof has prominent shed dormer windows that, along with numerous other windows at ground level, allow natural light into the facility.

The interior is set up with an entry concourse, Amtrak concourse and passenger concourse through the center connecting CARTA and Southeastern Stages at opposite ends. The floor has light and dark gray diamond pattern and accented with organic stone and wood elements. The facility is fully accessible compliant and offers additional meeting space and a museum to the Liberty Hill neighborhood.

== Services ==
The station is served by two Amtrak routes, for a total of four trains daily:

- The Palmetto (daytime train), with the northbound train at 10:00am and the southbound train at 7:19pm.
- The Silver Meteor (overnight train), with the northbound train at 9:17pm and the southbound train at 4:51am.

Amtrak operating hours are at 4:00am–11:45am and at 4:00pm–11:45pm, which includes the ticket counter, passenger assistance and baggage service.

== History ==
=== Atlantic Coast Line depot ===
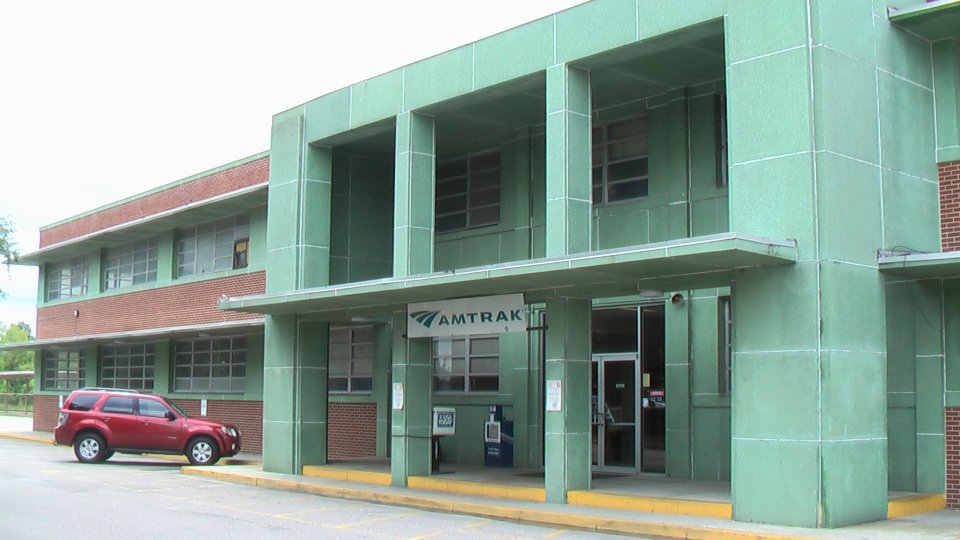
The former Atlantic Coast Line/Amtrak station

Opened in 1956, the Atlantic Coast Line (ACL) depot reflects mid-century modern design popular at the time of construction. It is characterized by clean lines and minimal ornamentation. Typical features of the mid-century modern aesthetic found in the Charleston depot include a flat roof, large groupings of windows with horizontal lights, and shallow cantilevered canopies at the first and second floors. Red brick and dyed-green concrete panels arranged in alternating horizontal bands emphasize the building's rectilinear lines. Public spaces feature exposed brick on the lower walls and floors of durable green terrazzo; both materials can stand the wear and tear of large crowds and are easy to maintain.

Passenger service was located on the first floor. As the station was built during the height of segregation, it was built with two separate waiting areas, each with their own sets of restrooms. In the days of segregation, whites used one waiting area and blacks used the other. The second floor housed the ACL freight office for the Charleston division; the office closed when became part of CSX Transportation's Florence division. In 1967, ACL merged with Seaboard Air Line Railroad to become Seaboard Coast Line Railroad (SCL). In 1971, passenger operations was transferred to Amtrak, while the station remained owned by SCL (later CSX Transportation). In 1972, the city of North Charleston was incorporated. In the 1980s, fencing topped with barbed wire surrounded the station after a rash of burglaries.

On December 13, 2018, all passenger rail service was relocated to the North Charleston Intermodal Transportation Center and the former Atlantic Coast Line/Amtrak station was officially closed.

Because the station was eligible for listing on the National Register of Historic Places, the City of North Charleston and CARTA made an agreement with the South Carolina State Historic Preservation Office (SHPO) that they will provide measured drawings and professional photography of the interior and exterior, to be submitted to SHPO and Clemson University as the repositories. An erection of a state historic marker. And salvage one of the exterior green tiles (before or during demolition) and include it and other photographs and information related to the station in the North Charleston Intermodal Transportation Center museum space.

Razing of the Atlantic Coast Line depot was scheduled for 2019.

=== Current station ===
Project for the current station began in 1996 with a feasibility study and site selection led by CARTA. The site chosen was a 36-acre (15 ha) tract located on West Montague Avenue, wedged between Dorchester Road and Interstate 526. From 1997 to 2007 the project went through a series of refinements, land purchasing and required NEPA assessments. With a 2007 groundbreaking, construction began with infrastructure and a park and ride lot.

In 2009, Davis & Floyd, Inc. joined the project, providing the architectural design and engineering for the building. The final design was a 32,000-square-foot (3,000 m^{2}) two-story double-towered edifice, evoking the architecture style of the Charleston Union Station that existed from 1907 to 1947. The facility was to included leasable space, restaurant/retail space, CARTA administration offices, additional meeting space and operations for Amtrak, CARTA and Southeastern Stages. In 2010, the project qualified for the State of Good Repair Program, providing Federal dollars from the Federal Transit Administration (FTA).

In 2012, because of the close proximity to the CSX Bennett Yard, the company rejected a platform permit without sidetrack. Additional costs related to constructing a sidetrack, so the station would not impede freight rail traffic, made the site no longer cost feasible thus stopping the project.

In 2014, CARTA began the process of relocating the project to Gaynor Avenue, adjacent to the existing Amtrak station. new NEPA and NHPA assessments were started as well zoning, permits, redesign and disposal of the Montague Avenue site. Bus tests were conducted on July 29, 2014, to confirm vertical clearance under Sevenmile Viaduct.

In 2015, project management and ownership was transferred from CARTA to the city of North Charleston. To keep costs within the $14.5 million budget, the new facility was downsized from 32,000 square feet (3,000 m^{2}) to 14,217 square feet (1,320.8 m^{2}), eliminating the leasable space, restaurant/retail space and CARTA administration offices. On February 2, 2016, the FTA gave final approval citing no significant impact on the environment. Phase one of construction began on August 24, 2017, with the new building and reconstruction of one-half of the side platform. The North Charleston Intermodal Transportation Center officially opened with early-morning train service on December 13, 2018.

In 2019, phase two of construction includes the razing of the Atlantic Coast Line depot, reconstructing the remaining half of the side platform, roadway modifications, CARTA bus turnoffs and vehicle parking.
