= Union Church of Port Royal =

Historic church in South Carolina, United States

- U.S. National Register of Historic Places
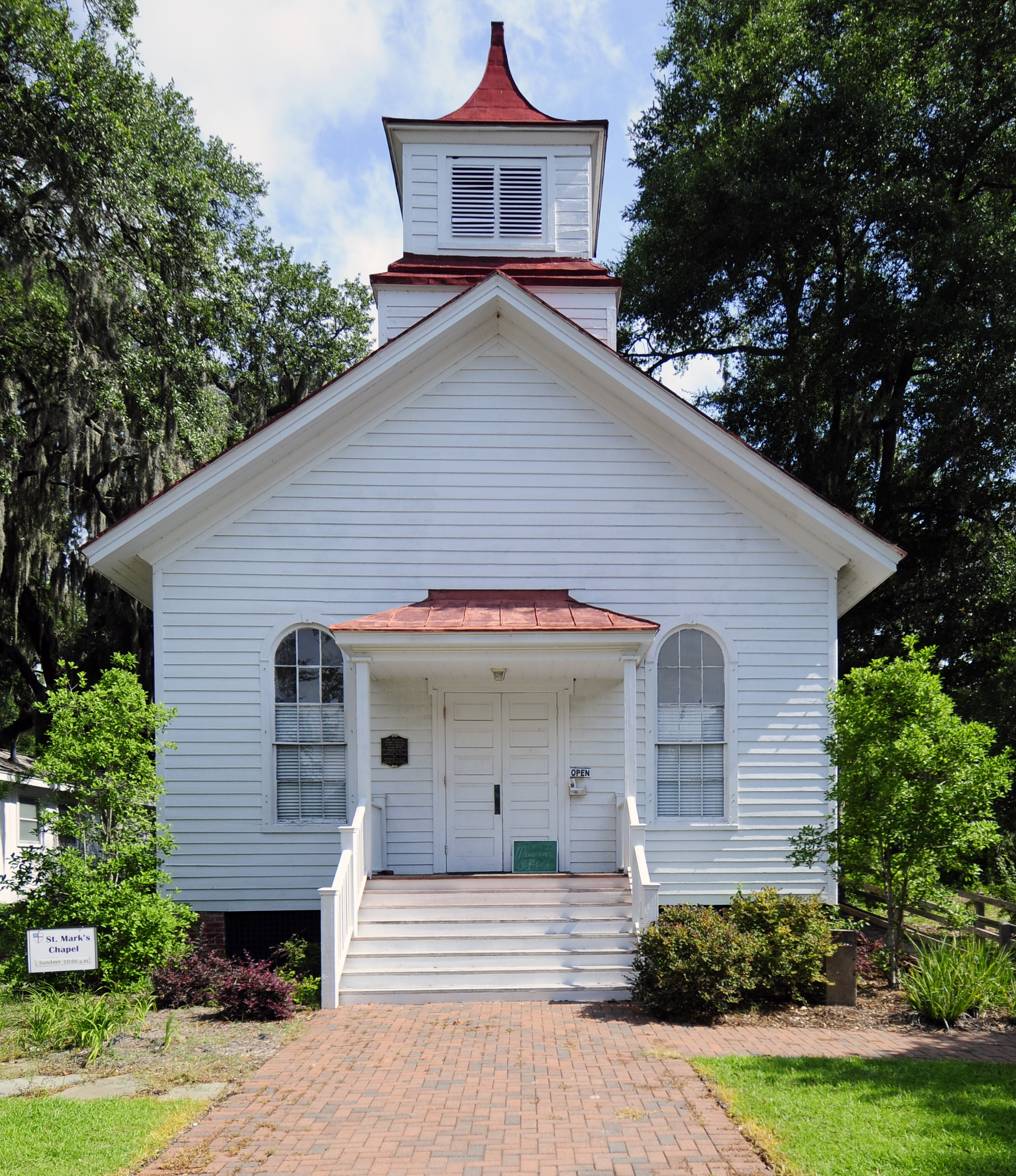
- Union Church of Port Royal, June 2012

- Location within South Carolina Location within the United States
- Location: 1004 11th St., Port Royal, South Carolina
- Coordinates: 32°22′37″N 80°41′35″W
- Area: less than one acre
- Built: 1877-1878
- Architectural style: Vernacular
- NRHP reference No.: 10000931
- Added to NRHP: November 17, 2010

Union Church of Port Royal, also known as Port Royal White Union Church, 11th Street Tabernacle, and Free Church of Port Royal, is a historic church located at Port Royal, Beaufort County, South Carolina. It was completed in 1878, and consists of a one-story, wood frame, brick-piered building with a central entry and portico. It has a cupola containing the church's belfry. It was built with donated lumber by local citizens in 1877–1878 to provide the Port Royal community its only white house of worship at that time.

It was listed in the National Register of Historic Places in 2010.
