= West Ashley Greenway =

Rail trail in South Carolina, US

Coordinates: 32°47′13″N 80°01′45″W

- Length: 8.8 mi (14.2 km)
- Location: Charleston, South Carolina, United States
- Trailheads: Main Road; Folly Road
- Use: Cycling, walking, hiking, jogging, skating
- Difficulty: Easy
- Season: Year round

The West Ashley Greenway is a rail trail in Charleston, South Carolina. It stretches across the West Ashley neighborhood from Main Road in the west to Folly Road in the east. It is a straight and mostly paved path utilized for walking, jogging, roller skating, and off-street cycling. The distance of the main trail currently covers 8.8 miles (14.2 km). It is a contributing segment of the East Coast Greenway. In 2019, the U.S. Department of Transportation gave the city of Charleston a $18 million grant to build a pedestrian bridge across the Ashley River connecting West Ashley to downtown Charleston. As of 2026, the pedestrian bridge is under construction. The planned pedestrian bridge may eventually connect with the Lowcountry Lowline.

The former railway, chartered in 1853, was the Croghans Branch of the Atlantic Coast Line Railroad. It was abandoned by Seaboard Coast Line Railroad in 1981 and over time, the City of Charleston entered into leasing agreements with utility companies that took over the right-of-way to allow for public access. The last section of the trail was completed in 2007.
