= F.W. Scheper Store =

- U.S. National Register of Historic Places
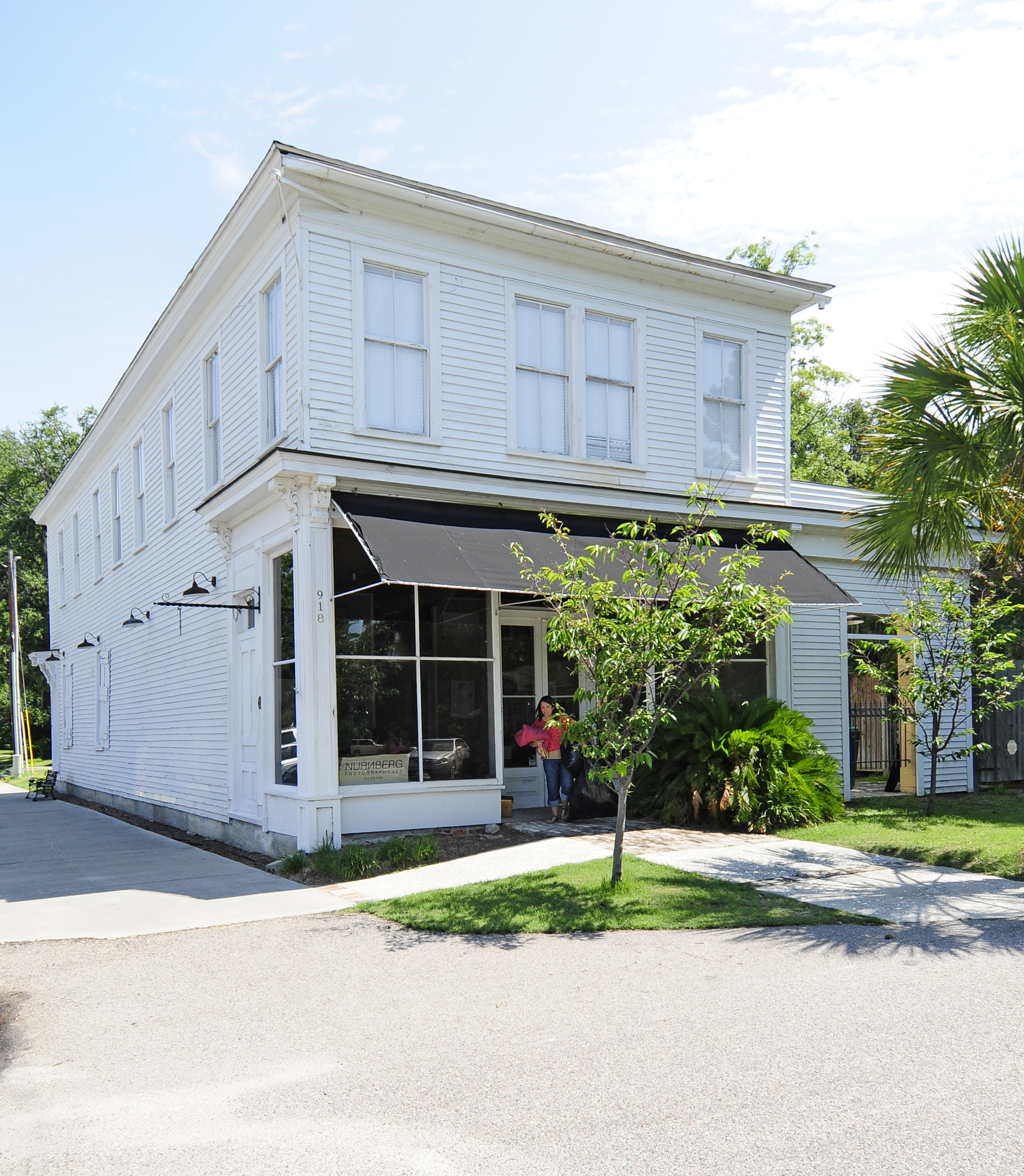
- F. W. Scheper Store, June 2012

- Location within South Carolina Location within the United States
- Location: 918 8th St., Port Royal, South Carolina
- Coordinates: 32°22′29″N 80°41′34″W
- Area: less than one acre
- Built: 1885
- Built by: Scheper, F.W.
- NRHP reference No.: 04000652
- Added to NRHP: June 22, 2004

F.W. Scheper Store is a historic general store located at Port Royal, Beaufort County, South Carolina. The store is one of the last remaining 19th century commercial buildings in Port Royal. It was built in 1885, and is a large two-story frame commercial building, with a one-story addition constructed between 1905 and 1912. It is the largest historic commercial building remaining in Port Royal. The store served the community from its construction by German immigrant F.W. Scheper until it closed for business in 1950.

It was listed in the National Register of Historic Places in 2004.
