= Port Royal Railroad =

The Port Royal Railroad was a South Carolina railroad that was constructed following the American Civil War. The line was chartered in 1856 but wasn't built until 1870. By 1871, it ran from Port Royal, South Carolina, to Yemassee, South Carolina. It was extended to Augusta, Georgia in 1873. That same year, the company declared bankruptcy and was sold to the new Port Royal and Augusta Railway in 1878.

Although the railroad's ownership changed hands several times over the years of its operation, the physical railroad was in continuous operation until 2006, when the Port of Port Royal was finally closed by the State of South Carolina. In 2009, ownership of the railroad right-of-way was transferred to the Beaufort-Jasper Water and Sewer Authority and was officially decommissioned. BJWSA began removing the rails in 2010 to prepare for water & sewer infrastructure and the creation of a rail trail. Portions of the Spanish Moss Trail opened to the public in 2012.

== See also ==
- Port Royal and Augusta Railway
- Charleston and Western Carolina Railway
- Spanish Moss Trail
