= Beaufort-Jasper Water and Sewer Authority =

Public water system in South Carolina, USA

Logo of the Beaufort-Jasper Water and Sewer Authority

The Beaufort-Jasper Water and Sewer Authority (often shortened to BJWSA) is a public water system and non-profit corporation which handles water and wastewater operations for many areas in Beaufort and Jasper counties in the Lowcountry region of South Carolina, United States. The Authority was created under the provisions of Act 784 by the South Carolina General Assembly in 1954 to provide services to Beaufort County. In 1969, its powers were expanded to include wastewater facility construction and services. In 1983, the authority merged with the Jasper County Water and Sewer Authority and thus adopting the BJWSA moniker.

Although initially set up to provide water and wastewater services to unincorporated areas, BJWSA has over time acquired municipal water and sewer systems for Beaufort, Port Royal, Bluffton, and Hardeeville. Since 2008, BJWSA also provides water and service to the military installations located in northern Beaufort County. In 2009, BJWSA assumed ownership of the former Port Royal Railroad right-of-way in northern Beaufort County. The railway was decommissioned and removed in order to allow BJWSA to use the right-of-way for future utility routing and to create the Spanish Moss Trail.

The authority is governed by an eleven-member board appointed by the Governor of South Carolina. A general manager is in charge of day-to-day operations of the authority and oversees the various departments and functions of BJWSA. The Authority's headquarters is located near the border of Beaufort and Jasper counties, between Beaufort and Bluffton along S.C. Highway 170 in the Okatie area.

The major fresh-water source for BJWSA is the Savannah River, approximately eight miles north of downtown Hardeeville. An eighteen-mile canal carries freshwater from the river to the BJWSA facility for treatment purposes. The authority operates two water treatment plants, three wastewater treatment plants and hundreds of pump stations.

BJWSA has approximately 57,000 retail accounts for water services and approximately 38,000 for wastewater services. BJWSA treats an average of 20 million gallons of water for consumption and 9 million gallons of wastewater each day.

== Awards ==
BJWSA has received many awards from state and national groups, including:

- Association of Metropolitan Water Associations 'Platinum Award for Competitiveness Achievement'
- Government Finance Officers Association Certificate of Achievement for Excellence in Financial Reporting 2004 - 2010
- South Carolina Department of Health and Environmental Control Facility Excellence Award
  - Cherry Point Wastewater Treatment Plant 2006 - 2010
  - Hardeeville Wastewater Treatment Plant 2006 - 2010
  - LB Wastewater Treatment Plant 2008-2010
