= Yemassee station =

Passenger train station in Yemassee, South Carolina

Yemassee, SC
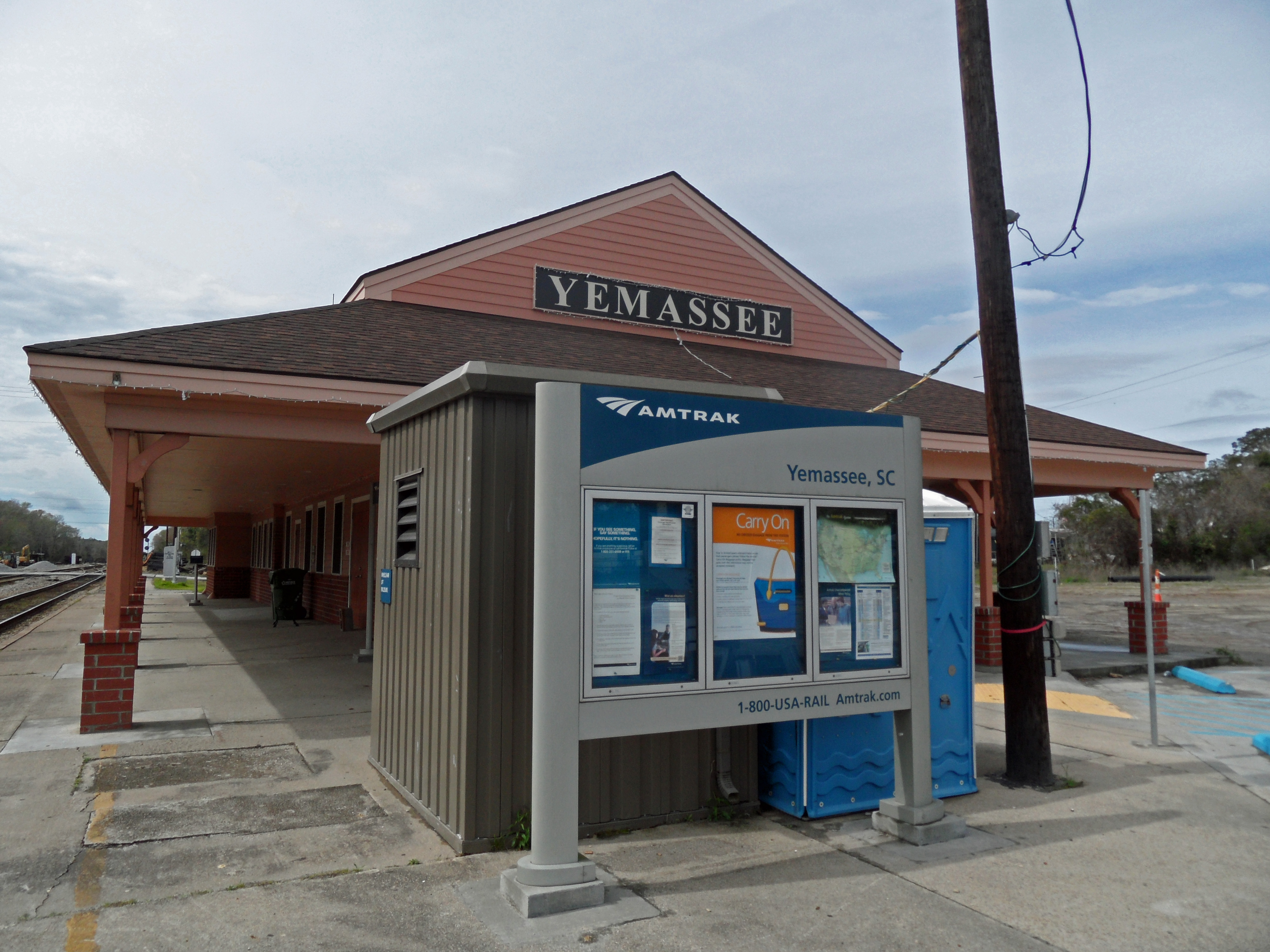
- Rebuilt station building and Amtrak information board

General information
- Location: 15 Wall Street; Yemassee, South Carolina; United States
- Coordinates: 32°41′17″N 80°50′49″W
- Owner: Town of Yemassee
- Line: Charleston Subdivision
- Platforms: 1 side platform
- Tracks: 2

Construction
- Accessible: Yes

Other information
- Station code: Amtrak: YEM

Passengers
- FY 2025: 8,911 (Amtrak)

Services
| Preceding station | Amtrak | Following station |
|---|---|---|
| Savannah Terminus | Palmetto | Charleston toward New York |
| Savannah toward Miami | Silver Meteor | Charleston toward New York |
Auto Train does not stop here
Former services
| Preceding station | Atlantic Coast Line Railroad | Following station |
|---|---|---|
| Ridgeland toward Tampa | Main Line | Green Pond toward Richmond |
| Early Branch toward Spartanburg | Charleston and Western Carolina Railway Main Line | Tomotley toward Port Royal |
Location

Yemassee station is an Amtrak train stop in Yemassee, South Carolina. Located at 15 Wall Street (erroneously listed as 9 Main Street on the Amtrak timetable and the Amtrak official website), the station consists of a covered platform on the northwest side of the northeast-southwest tracks, a small parking lot, and a building. The building is mostly boarded up, but it does have a small waiting room for Amtrak passengers. It also contains a freight depot. Both the station and the freight house were originally built by the Charleston and Western Carolina Railway. The current station house was built around 1955 as a replacement for several other stations in the past. The station was later run by the Atlantic Coast Line Railroad.

Yemassee is served by the Palmetto and Silver Meteor trains of Amtrak's Silver Service. Both trains pass through Yemassee, near the growing towns of Beaufort and Hilton Head, at roughly the same times of the day; the northbound Palmetto and southbound Silver Meteor do so in the morning, while the southbound Palmetto and northbound Silver Meteor come through in the evening.

From 1915 to 1965, the Yemassee station was the first place where potential United States Marines recruits stopped before reaching Marine Corps Recruit Depot Parris Island. Many Marines that fought in wars and conflicts spanning World War I through Vietnam began their careers at the train station.

The town is in the process of purchasing the station from Amtrak as part of a local revitalization effort.

== Image gallery ==
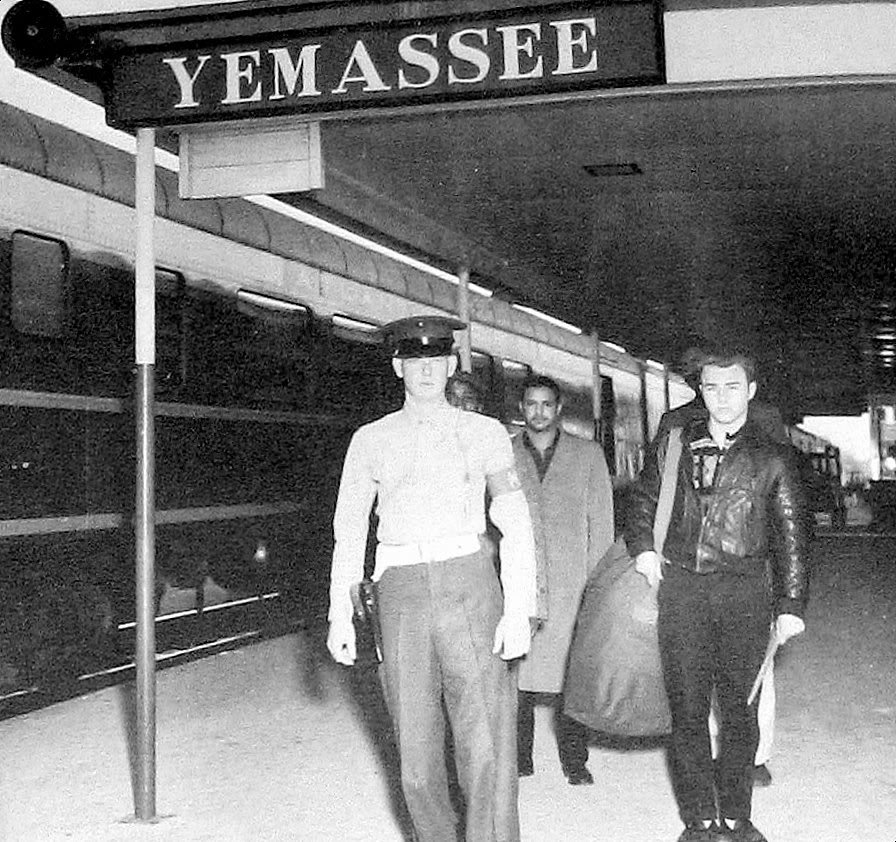
A U.S. Marine with recruits at Yemassee train station, date unknown.

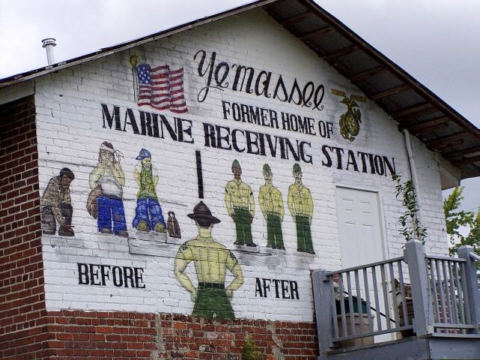
Yemassee used to be a receiving station for recruits when they left for Marine Corps Recruit Depot Parris Island, SC.

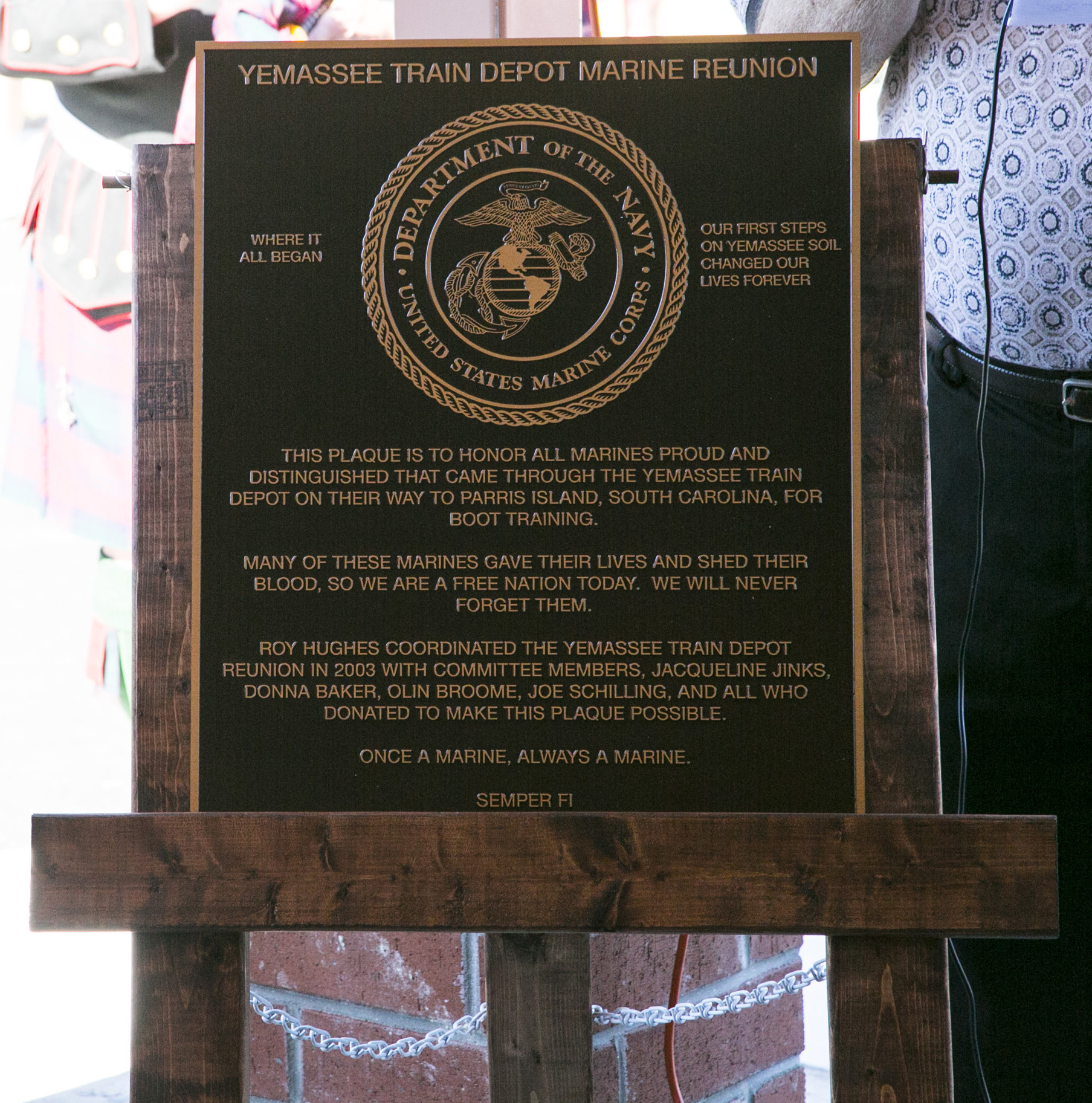
Marine Corps plaque for Yemassee Train Station.
