= Little Barnwell Island =

Archaeological site in South Carolina, United States

- U.S. National Register of Historic Places
- Location within South Carolina Location within the United States
- Location: North of Port Royal, near Port Royal, South Carolina
- Coordinates: 32°30′6″N 80°47′25″W
- Area: 3 acres (1.2 ha)
- NRHP reference No.: 73001676
- Added to NRHP: August 14, 1973

Little Barnwell Island is a historic archeological site located near Port Royal, Beaufort County, South Carolina. The site consists of two shell and earth mounds located on the eastern side of Little Barnwell Island overlooking Whale Branch. The larger of the two mounds is elliptical and once served as the base for a temple or ceremonial building. The mounds and building were probably constructed during the late Savannah II Period ca. A.D. 1500.

It was listed in the National Register of Historic Places in 1973.
