= Augusta, Knoxville and Greenwood Railroad =

Overview
- Locale: South Carolina, USA
- Dates of operation: – 1880 (consolidation into A&K)
- Successor: Augusta and Knoxville Railroad

Technical
- Length: 35 mi (56 km) graded right-of-way, no track

The Augusta, Knoxville and Greenwood Railroad (AK&G) was a South Carolina railroad company chartered shortly after the end of the Reconstruction period.

In May 1877, the Greenwood and Augusta Railroad was incorporated into and became a branch of the AK&G. In February 1878, it was reported that the company had completed grading on 8 miles (13 km) of right-of-way beginning at Greenwood, South Carolina, with the goal of building a line to Knoxville, Tennessee. On May 8, 1878, the AK&G board awarded a contract to Wm. D. Grant of Atlanta to grade the next section of the line from Augusta to Walton's Island and to bridge across Warren's Canal. The groundbreaking ceremony for this next section was held on May 25, 1878. By June 1878, grading had proceeded such that they had expected to grade 4 miles (6.4 km) of right-of-way in a month. At the AK&G's second annual meeting of stockholders, it was announced that grading work continued through to June 10, 1879, with the last sections expected to be completed by December 20, and the actual cost of construction so far had come in about $17,600 under budget; additionally, progress on the bridge piers and abutments at the Savannah River was positively reported.

In 1880 the AK&G was consolidated with the Augusta and Knoxville Railroad. By the time of the acquisition, the AK&G had graded 35 miles (56 km) of right-of-way. Following the merger, the new company was called the Augusta and Knoxville Railroad.
