= Port Royal, South Carolina =

- Town
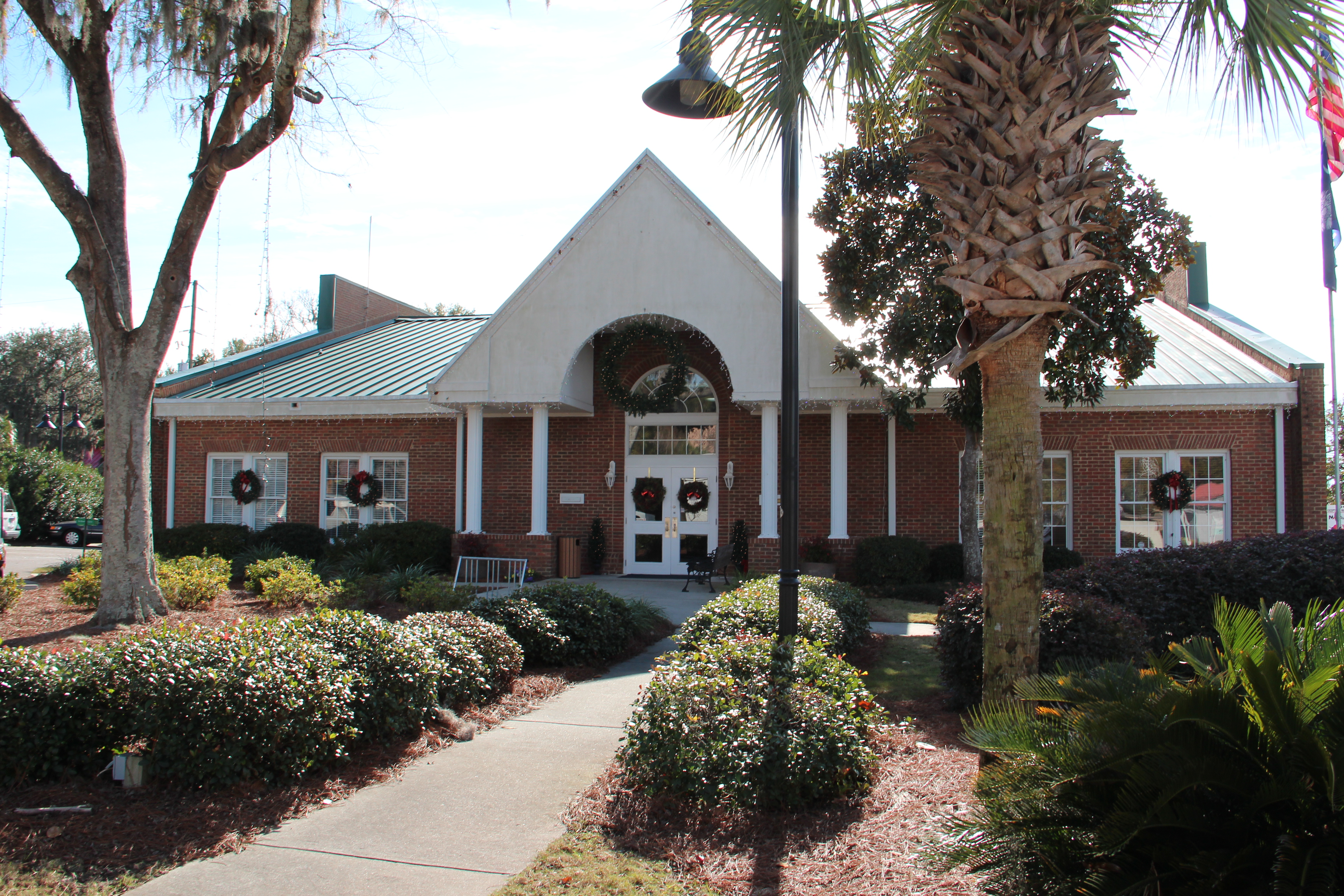
- Port Royal Municipal Offices

- Seal
- Interactive map of Port Royal, South Carolina
- Location within South Carolina Location within the United States
- Coordinates: 32°23′15″N 80°43′44″W
- Country: United States
- State: South Carolina
- County: Beaufort

Area
  - Town: 19.55 sq mi (50.64 km^{2})
  - Land: 16.97 sq mi (43.94 km^{2})
  - Water: 2.59 sq mi (6.70 km^{2})
- Elevation: 3 ft (0.91 m)

Population (2020)
  - Town: 14,220
  - Density: 838.2/sq mi (323.63/km^{2})
  - Urban: 52,515 (US: 487th)
  - Urban density: 1,200/sq mi (463.3/km^{2})
- Time zone: UTC-5 (Eastern (EST))
  - Summer (DST): UTC-4 (EDT)
- ZIP code: 29935
- Area codes: 843, 854
- FIPS code: 45-58030
- GNIS feature ID: 2407149
- Website: www.portroyal.org

Port Royal is a town on Port Royal Island in Beaufort County, South Carolina, United States. The population was 14,220 at the 2020 census. It is part of the Hilton Head Island metropolitan area. Port Royal is home to Marine Corps Recruit Depot Parris Island and United States Naval Hospital Beaufort.

== History ==
Port Royal takes its name from the adjacent Port Royal Sound, which was explored and named by Frenchman Jean Ribault in 1562. Ribault founded the short-lived settlement of Charlesfort on Parris Island. The area later became the site of a Spanish and still later Scottish colony during the 17th century.

Port Royal was the site of the Naval Battle of Port Royal during the Civil War. Later during the war, it was one of the sites of the Port Royal Experiment, which included most of the Sea Islands in Union hands. In 1863, the Emancipation Proclamation was first read at Christmas under the Proclamation tree in Port Royal.

Due to the benefits of a large and sheltered natural harbor, Port Royal was able to develop port facilities to support the growing phosphate mining activities after the Civil War. The Port Royal Railroad was completed from Port Royal to a junction with the main Charleston and Savannah Railway in Yemassee, thus establishing a land route for trade and commerce. Port Royal was the southeastern terminus of the Charleston and Western Carolina Railway, the railroad last had passenger trains to Port Royal in the mid-1950s. Development of a community around the previously isolated port site at the end of the Beaufort River and Battery Creek led to the platting of streets and town lots by development interests. A land rush ensued, and Port Royal was officially incorporated in 1874, 300 years after initial settlement efforts.

The Sea Islands Hurricane of 1893 destroyed much of the phosphate industry and stunted development, but the port continued to operate throughout the 20th century. The opening of Parris Island as a Marine Corps recruiting station brought some vitality back to the community, though rapid residential growth did not occur until the later decades of the 20th century. The port's vitality however began to decline as the State of South Carolina began to focus on dredging Charleston's harbor and expanding port facilities further up the coast. In an effort to save costs, the State Ports Authority closed the port facility in Port Royal in 2004. Efforts to redevelop have been ongoing but been hampered by the Great Recession. Due to annexation, including Parris Island, the population of Port Royal rose from 3,950 in 2000 to 10,678 in 2010, a 170% increase.

The Camp Saxton Site, Fort Frederick Heritage Preserve, Hasell Point Site, Little Barnwell Island, F.W. Scheper Store, and Union Church of Port Royal are listed on the National Register of Historic Places.

== Neighborhoods ==
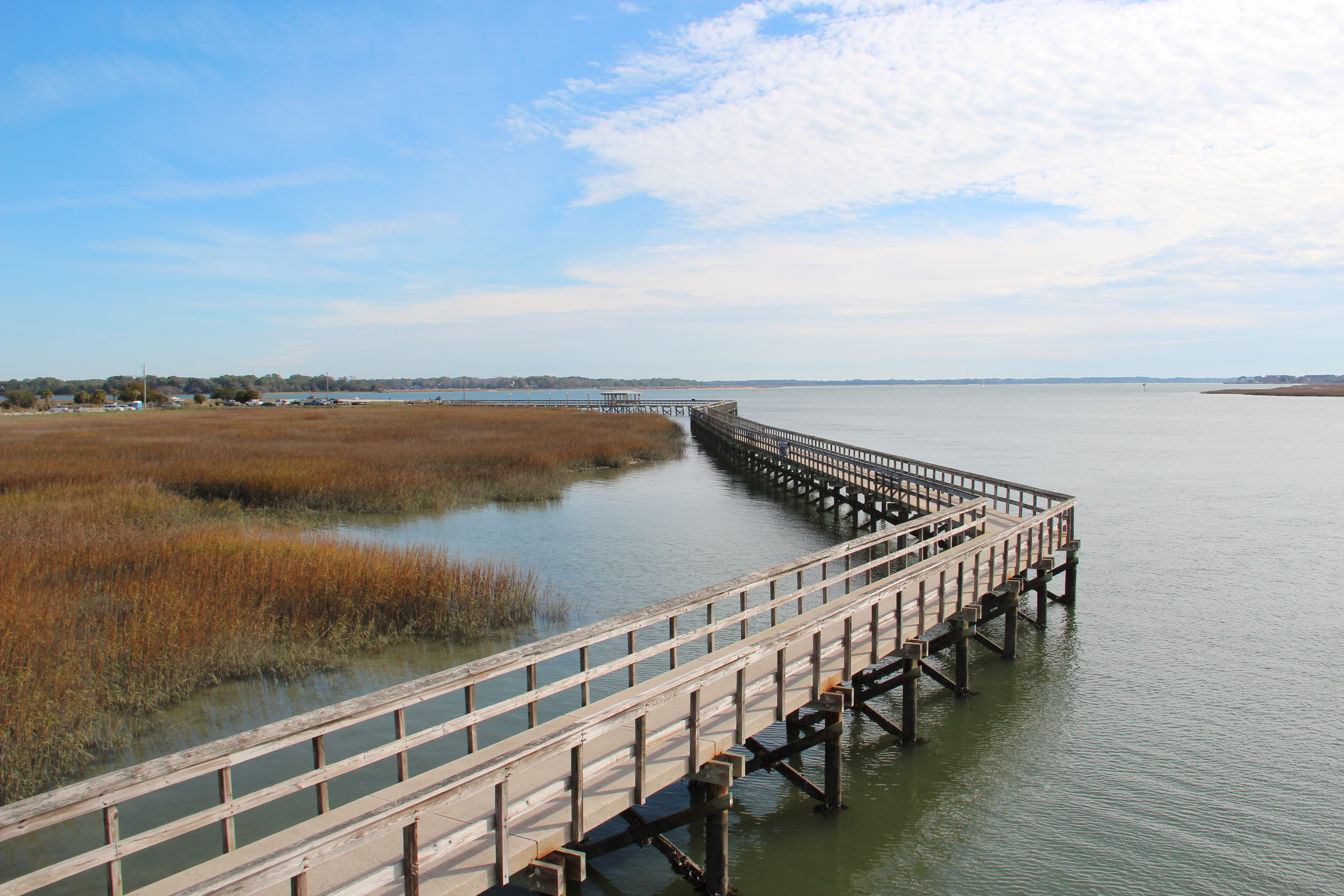
Sands Beach boardwalk

The Old Village is the historic center of Port Royal. Streets running north–south are named after the capitals of nations whose immigrants have settled in the Port Royal area (Paris, London, Madrid, and Edinburgh). Paris Avenue is the primary commercial street in the Old Village. Immediately north of the Old Village is a low-density residential area known as Mossy Creek, which crosses over into incorporated areas of the city of Beaufort to the north. A large portion of Port Royal's population lives in the Preserve at Port Royal Apartments, in between the Old Village and Mossy Creek.

Historically, Port Royal's municipal boundaries were defined by Beaufort to the north, the Beaufort River to the east, Parris Island to the south, and Battery Creek to the west. Since the start of the 21st century however, Port Royal began to annex lands west and south of its core area. The Parris Island Marine Corps Base was annexed on October 11, 2000, effectively doubling the municipal population overnight due to on-base housing. Port Royal also annexed properties in the Shell Point and Burton areas of Beaufort County.

Challenges were filed, and the 2000 annexation of undeveloped Rose Island was to be heard by the South Carolina Supreme Court in 2005. Town representatives said the city annexed Rose Island because it was within the "line of sight" of the Doggett Tract, a group of islands off Shell Point already under the town's jurisdiction.

In 2006, Port Royal annexed two tracts of land south of the Broad River based on the so-called line-of-sight rule.

== Culture ==
=== In film ===
The hurricane scene from the 1994 film Forrest Gump was filmed in the town's dock area.

=== Community events ===
Paris Avenue (the main street of the Old Village) periodically hosts Street Music events throughout the year. Port Royal also hosts an annual soft shell crab festival in late April and a community oyster roast in late October. Beaufort Charities hosts its annual Oyster Roast in Live Oaks Park in March.

== Geography ==
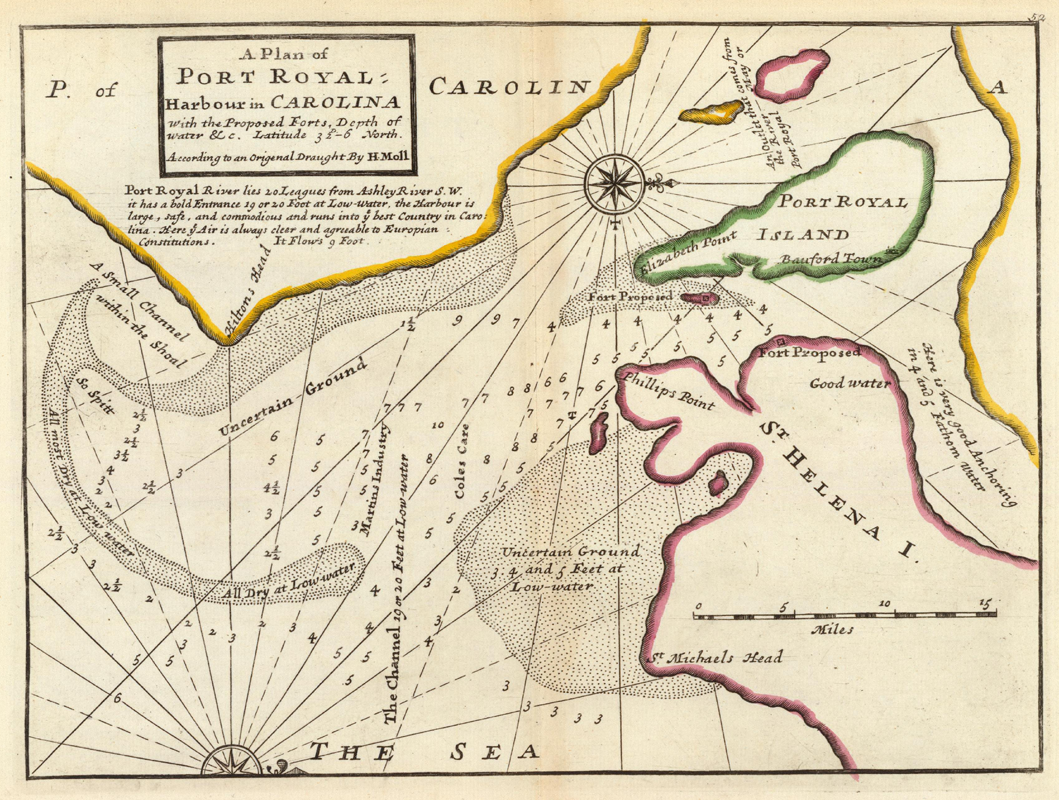
Herman Moll: A Plan of Port Royal-Harbour in Carolina, 1736

Port Royal has expanded in recent times by annexation of parcels of land on the west side of Battery Creek.

According to the United States Census Bureau, the town has a total area of 22.0 square miles (57.0 km^{2}), of which 19.0 square miles (49.1 km^{2}) is land and 3.1 square miles (7.9 km^{2}), or 13.92%, is water.

== Demographics ==
Historical population
Census	Pop.	Note	%±
1880	170		—
1890	524		208.2%
1900	601		14.7%
1910	363		−39.6%
1920	383		5.5%
1930	353		−7.8%
1940	342		−3.1%
1950	793		131.9%
1960	686		−13.5%
1970	2,865		317.6%
1980	2,977		3.9%
1990	2,985		0.3%
2000	3,950		32.3%
2010	10,678		170.3%
2020	14,220		33.2%
2025 (est.)	16,648	▲	17.1%
U.S. Decennial Census

=== 2020 census ===
As of the 2020 census, Port Royal had a population of 14,220. The median age was 23.7 years. Of residents, 22.7% were under the age of 18 and 9.5% were 65 years of age or older. For every 100 females, there were 139.6 males, and for every 100 females age 18 and over, there were 140.1 males age 18 and over.

Of residents, 92.5% lived in urban areas, while 7.5% lived in rural areas.

There were 4,106 households and 2,291 families in Port Royal, of which 35.0% had children under the age of 18 living in them. Of all households, 42.2% were married-couple households, 18.7% were households with a male householder and no spouse or partner present, and 34.0% were households with a female householder and no spouse or partner present. About 31.6% of all households were made up of individuals, and 11.0% had someone living alone who was 65 years of age or older.

There were 4,764 housing units, of which 13.8% were vacant. The homeowner vacancy rate was 3.5% and the rental vacancy rate was 12.4%.

Racial composition as of the 2020 census
Race	Number	Percent
White	8,875	62.4%
Black or African American	2,873	20.2%
American Indian and Alaska Native	65	0.5%
Asian	340	2.4%
Native Hawaiian and Other Pacific Islander	17	0.1%
Some other race	424	3.0%
Two or more races	1,626	11.4%
Hispanic or Latino (of any race)	2,093	14.7%

=== 2000 census ===
As of the census of 2000, there were 3,950 people, 1,660 households, and 1,010 families residing in the town. The population density was 1,017.3 inhabitants per square mile (392.8/km^{2}). There were 1,792 housing units at an average density of 461.5 per square mile (178.2/km^{2}). The racial makeup of the town was 64.18% White, 29.16% African American, 0.46% Native American, 1.70% Asian, 0.10% Pacific Islander, 1.92% from other races, and 2.48% from two or more races. Hispanic or Latino of any race were 4.28% of the population.

There were 1,660 households, out of which 30.2% had children under the age of 18 living with them, 43.6% were married couples living together, 13.7% had a female householder with no husband present, and 39.1% were non-families. 31.1% of all households were made up of individuals, and 7.8% had someone living alone who was 65 years of age or older. The average household size was 2.27 and the average family size was 2.86.

In the town, the population was spread out, with 22.9% under the age of 18, 14.6% from 18 to 24, 34.2% from 25 to 44, 17.3% from 45 to 64, and 11.0% who were 65 years of age or older. The median age was 30 years. For every 100 females, there were 91.0 males. For every 100 females age 18 and over, there were 89.1 males.

The median income for a household in the town was $36,599, and the median income for a family was $40,867. Males had a median income of $26,942 versus $23,671 for females. The per capita income for the town was $18,163. About 7.9% of families and 10.1% of the population were below the poverty line, including 11.0% of those under age 18 and 18.6% of those age 65 or over.

== Transportation ==
Port Royal is served by U.S. Highway 21, and S.C. Highways 128, 170, and 281. The Marine Corps Crossing Bridge (U.S. 21) connects the Old Village with Parris Island and newly annexed areas in the Shell Point area. Port Royal was previously the terminus for the Port Royal Railroad, which is being converted to the Spanish Moss Trail, a 14.9-mile rail trail (24.0 km) connecting the town with Beaufort and other communities to the north.

== Notable person ==
- General Randolph M. Pate (1898–1961), Commandant of the Marine Corps, 1956-1959
