= Lowcountry Rapid Transit =

Bus Transit system in South Carolina

- Service area: Charleston County
- Service type: Bus rapid transit
- Stations: 20
- Fleet: 21 60 ft Diesel Articulated Buses
- Website: https://lowcountryrapidtransit.com/index.html

The Lowcountry Rapid Transit system (LCRT) is a bus rapid transit system in development which will initially connect downtown Charleston to the Exchange Park in Ladson, South Carolina (also known as the Ladson Fairgrounds). Plans are for the system to eventually reach Summerville, South Carolina.

The LCRT is the first public mass transit project in the history of South Carolina. Construction is slated to begin in 2027. When completed, the system will be among the longest rapid transit systems in the United States.

== Plans and development ==
=== Design of the system ===
LCRT is expected to initially consist of 21 buses that will ferry people between the Medical District in downtown Charleston to the Ladson Fairgrounds at $2.25 per fare. The current plan is for the system to traverse approximately 22 miles, making it one of the longest rapid transportation systems in the United States. The system will start with 18 stops, a large portion of which are likely to be on Rivers Avenue in North Charleston.

The scope of the work for the project currently includes adding dedicated bus lanes to the medians along key streets such as Rivers Avenue, adding traffic signals to give buses priority at intersections, constructing twenty bus stations and several park-and-rides, as well as overall road improvements. The system will use existing infrastructure from Charleston Area Regional Transportation Authority (CARTA) when possible.

The Berkeley-Charleston-Dorchester Council of Governments (BCDCOG) started the development of the LCRT in 2014. Due to the area's geographic population spread, BCDCOG determined that rail was impractical. Costs for LCRT are estimated to be $625 million.

=== Funding and planning ===
In 2018, the Federal Transit Administration provided a $880,000 grant to aid in planning for development along the line. In 2021, the administration provided another $860,000 to BCDCOG for key development tools. A transit framework plan also determined other potential bus transit corridors in the area. As of July 28, 2023, BCDCOG and officials for the bus rapid transit system are hosting public input meetings for the project. Currently, the project is planned to begin construction in 2027 with a late 2029 or early 2030 finalization date.

=== U.S. Highway 52 corridor system ===
In 2024, BCDCOG began conducting a feasibility study for a separate bus rapid transit system along the Highway 52 corridor. Preliminary plans of the rapid bus transit system include a connection to the planned LCRT at Rivers Avenue and Melnick Drive.
