= Mount Pleasant Towne Centre =

- Location: Mount Pleasant, South Carolina, United States
- Coordinates: 32.8296°N 79.8303°W
- Opened: 1999
- Manager: Bayer Properties
- Owner: Bayer Properties
- Num. of anchor tenants: 4
- Website: www.mtpleasanttownecentre.com

Mount Pleasant Towne Centre is an upscale shopping center located in Mount Pleasant, South Carolina. The shopping center has over 65 national and local retail stores such as Belk, Buckle, Chico's, Gap, LOFT, Lululemon, LUSH Cosmetics, Versona, and Victoria's Secret. Mount Pleasant Towne Centre is located on Highway 17 North at the Isle of Palms Connector.

The complex hosts an annual "Fashion Camp" where young fashionistas can learn about the clothing industry, and visit stores in the area.

Town Center is served by CARTA Public Transit with two sheltered inbound stops available for transit riders traveling west to other Parts of Mount Pleasant and downtown Charleston. Eastbound the route runs all the way to Wando High School.
