= Spanish Moss Trail =

Coordinates: 32°25′36″N 80°41′32″W

- Length: 14.9 mi (24.0 km)
- Location: Beaufort County, South Carolina, United States
- Trailheads: Seabrook; Port Royal
- Use: Cycling, Walking, Hiking, Jogging, Inline Skating
- Difficulty: Flat, paved, 12 feet wide
- Season: Year round

The Spanish Moss Trail is a partially-completed, ten-mile multi-purpose rail trail in northern Beaufort County, South Carolina.

Using the former Port Royal Railroad right-of-way now owned by Beaufort-Jasper Water and Sewer Authority, the dedicated trail follows a north–south path from Seabrook to Port Royal while passing through Burton and Beaufort.

Construction of the rail trail began in summer of 2012, with the first segment opening later that year. Once completed, the will be 14.9 miles (24.0 km). A second phase may extend 10.1 miles (16.3 km) to Yemassee. The Spanish Moss Trail is a segment of the East Coast Greenway.

In 2020, Outside magazine named the trail one of the Top Urban Trails in the United States.

== Features ==
Open from dawn to dusk, the 12-feet wide, paved path is available to pedestrians and non-motorized transportation. Motorized wheelchairs are allowed. The trail features six trailheads with parking and pet waste stations, coastal marsh views and recreational fishing — and two port-a-potty facilities at the Broome Lane, Depot Road trailheads. Motorized vehicles, alcoholic beverages, litter, fishing. waste, and unleashed pets are prohibited.

== See also ==
- Port Royal Railroad
