= Port Royal and Augusta Railway =

Overview
- Dates of operation: 1856 (chartered); 1871–1886
- Predecessor: Port Royal Railroad
- Successor: Port Royal and Western Carolina Railway

Technical
- Track gauge: 4 ft 9 in (1,448 mm)
- Length: 112 mi (180 km)

The Port Royal and Augusta Railway was a South Carolina railroad that existed in the latter half of the 19th century.

The Port Royal Railroad Company was chartered in 1856 and the line was completed in 1870. In 1873, the Georgia Railroad provided financial assistance to the Port Royal Railroad Company, but Port Royal Railroad Company defaulted in November 1873 and the railroad was sold to the Georgia Railroad under foreclosure in June 1878, with the Union Trust Company of New York as Trustees. The Georgia Railroad reorganized it under the name Port Royal and Augusta Railway, and the company expanded.

In 1881 Georgia Railroad leased its rail lines for 99 years to Colonel William M. Wadley, who assigned half of the interest to Louisville and Nashville Railroad and the other half to Central Rail Road and Banking Company of Georgia. That same year, Central Rail Road and Banking Company of Georgia acquired controlling stock in Port Royal and Augusta Railway.

In 1893, the State of South Carolina filed suit in State of South Carolina v. Port Royal and Augustra Railway Company, alleging that Central Rail Road and Banking Company of Georgia was intentionally diverting trade from Port Royal to its own lines by misuse of its voting power. Under the directors they appointed, the State alleged, the facilities of Port Royal Railroad Company had been allowed to deteriorate. Central Rail Road and Banking Company of Georgia was forced into receivership and sold, reorganized as Central of Georgia Railway. Central's purchasers, Ryan and Thomas, claimed to have purchased the company's interest in the lease, a claim denied by one of the receivers. Louisville and Nashville Railroad had continued to pay their lease and receive their profits, while Central of Georgia had not. In light of this, the Port Royal and Augusta Railway Company filed suited against Central of Georgia for unpaid leases. However, in 1894, before resolution of any suit, the State of Georgia repealed the charter of the Port Royal and Augusta Railway and liquidated its assets, rendering legal action moot.

By 1898, The Port Royal and Augusta Railway and the Port Royal and Western Carolina Railway had been combined into the new Charleston and Western Carolina Railway. Today the segment between Augusta and Yemassee are part of the CSX Augusta Subdivision, while the segment south of Yemassee to Seabrook are part of the Beaufort-Jasper Water and Sewer Authority and the Spanish Moss Trail.
