= Charleston and Western Carolina Railway =

Railway in Georgia and South Carolina

Charleston & Western Carolina Railway

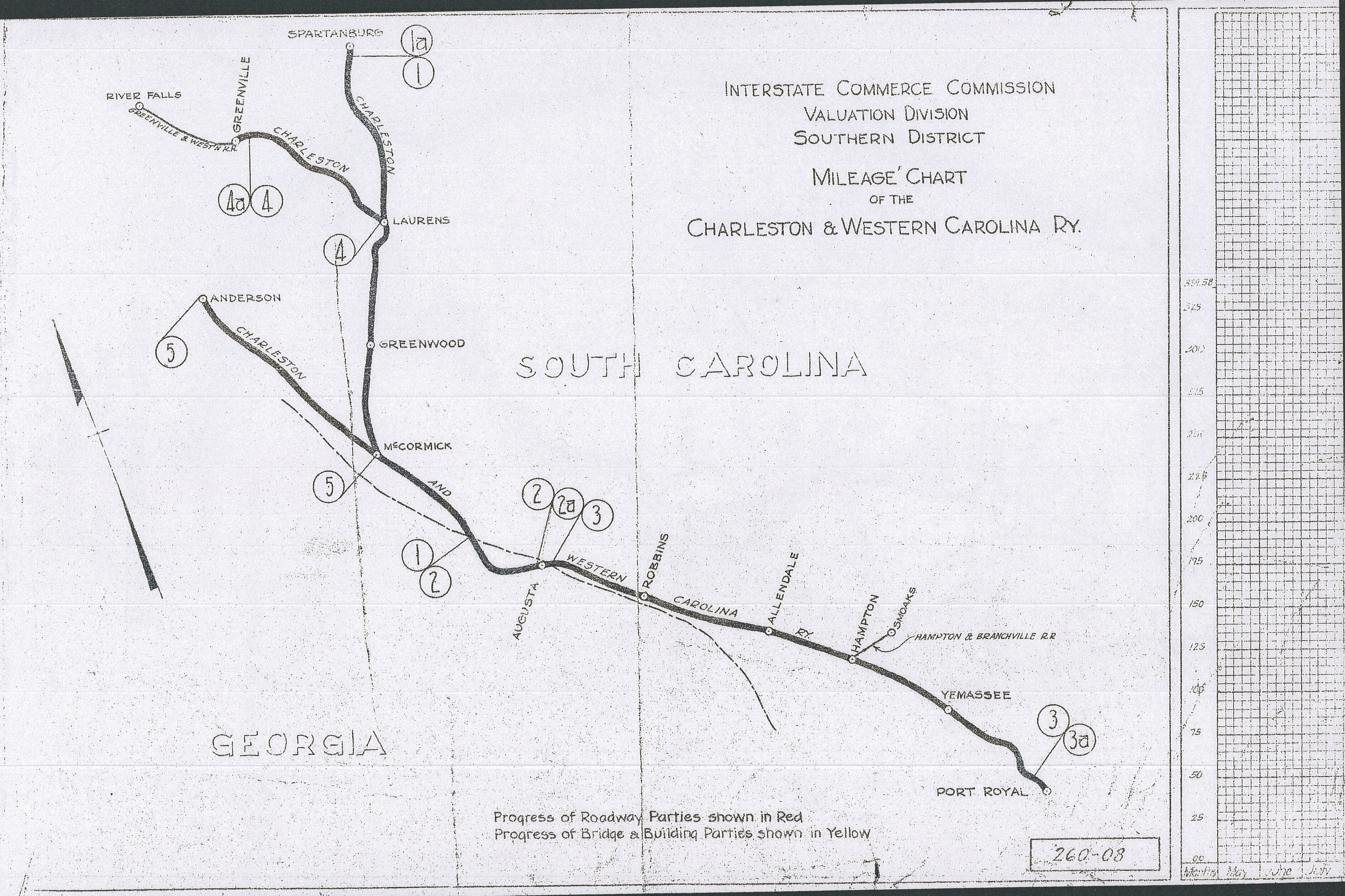
- 1917 map of the railroad

Overview
- Locale: Georgia and South Carolina
- Dates of operation: 1896–1959
- Successor: Atlantic Coast Line Railroad

Technical
- Track gauge: 4 ft 8 1/2 in (1,435 mm) standard gauge
- Length: 341 miles (549 km)

The Charleston and Western Carolina Railway (C&WC) was formed in 1896 to operate the lines of the former Port Royal and Augusta Railway (PR&A) and the Port Royal and Western Carolina Railway (PR&WC). The PR&A and PR&WC had originally been part of the Central of Georgia Railroad but the South Carolina Legislature had forced the railroad to give up the subsidiary lines. The Atlantic Coast Line Railroad (ACL) took over the C&WC in 1897 but operated it as a subsidiary until 1959 when the ACL fully absorbed it. Much of the original system is still in use by ACL successor CSX Transportation.

== Origins ==
When the Charleston & Western Carolina Railway was created in 1896, it combined two existing railroads, the Port Royal and Augusta Railway and the Port Royal and Western Carolina Railway into a single entity. The oldest portion of the line, the PR&A, ran from Port Royal to Augusta, a distance of 112 miles (180 km) following its completion in 1873. It was financed by the Georgia Railroad of Augusta, which sought to extend its own network and gain access to a port on the east coast. Fearing its port at Savannah would be compromised by any expansion of the facilities at Port Royal, the Central of Georgia Railway took control of the Port Royal & Augusta in 1881.

The Central of Georgia sought to expand into the western portion of South Carolina in order to funnel traffic through their lines out of Augusta. In order to accomplish this goal, the Central leased the Augusta and Knoxville Railroad in 1883, which owned a 68 miles (109 km) line from Augusta to Greenwood. Shortly thereafter, the Central financed construction of three new lines; the first was an extension from Greenwood to Spartanburg, 66 miles (106 km) completed in 1885, the second a branch from McCormick to Anderson, 58 miles (93 km), and a final branch from Laurens to Greenville, 36 miles (58 km). In 1886, all of these branches including the Augusta & Knoxville were merged to create the Port Royal and Western Carolina Railway. Financial trouble in 1894 caused the Central of Georgia to lose control of both companies.

Finally, in 1896, the Charleston & Western Carolina Railway was organized to consolidate both railroads into a single entity. The result was a 341 miles (549 km) railroad network covering most of western South Carolina. In 1897, the Atlantic Coast Line took control of the C&WC and operated the railroad as an independent company.

The C&WC operated passenger trains between Augusta and Port Royal, with a stop at Yemassee, South Carolina, where passengers could transfer to ACL trains to Savannah or Charleston. The Augusta to Port Royal train is in the December 1954 Official Guide and not in the August 1955.

The ACL absorbed the C&WC in 1959. From there the trackage of the former C&WC moved through the merger tree, first to Seaboard Coast Line in 1967, then to Seaboard System in 1983, and finally CSX Transportation in 1986. Most of the original C&WC system survives under CSX Transportation, which includes the Augusta Subdivision, McCormick Subdivision, and the Spartanburg Subdivision. The remains of the former Laurens to Greenville branch survives as the Carolina Piedmont Railroad.

== Historic stations ==
Main Line
State	Milepost	City/Location	Station	Connections and notes
SC	AMJ 468.1	Port Royal	Port Royal	
SC	AMJ 463.8	Beaufort	Beaufort	
SC	AMJ 462.1		Burton	
SC	AMJ 455.2		Seabrook	
SC	AMJ 453.9		Coosaw	junction with Seaboard Air Line Railroad Charleston Subdivision
SC	AMJ 450.0		Sheldon	
SC	A 443.3	Yemassee	Yemassee	junction with Atlantic Coast Line Railroad Main Line
SC	AMH 449.0		Early Branch	
SC	AMH 453.4		Cummings	
SC	AMH 459.9	Varnville	Varnville	
SC	AMH 461.9	Hampton	Hampton	junction with Hampton and Branchville Railroad
SC	AMH 462.6		Mauldins Mill	
SC	AMH 468.4	Brunson	Brunson	
SC	AMH 471.9	Fairfax	Fairfax	junction with Seaboard Air Line Railroad Main Line
SC	AMH 477.3	Allendale	Allendale	junction with Carolina Midland Railway (SOU)
SC	AMH 485.6		Beldoc	
SC	AMH 489.2		Martin	
SC	AMH 492.7		Millett	
SC	AMH 501.2; AK 431.2		Robbins	junction with Atlantic Coast Line Railroad Florence—Robbins Line
SC	AK 438.6		Ellenton	
SC	AK 445.2	Jackson	Jackson	
SC	AK 448.4		Kathwood	
SC	AK 454.3		Beech Island	
GA	AK 459.5	Augusta	Augusta Union Station	junction with: Augusta and Savannah Railroad (CoG); Augusta Southern Railroad (SOU); South Carolina Railroad (SOU); Georgia Railroad
GA	AK 461.5	Augusta	Broad Street	
GA	AK 468.2		Martinez	
GA	AK 472.0		Evans	
SC	AK 472.6		Griffin	
SC	AK 476.8		Woodlawn	
SC	AK 483.5		Clark Hill	
SC	AK 488.4		Modoc	
SC	AK 492.3	Parksville	Parksville	
SC	AK 497.7	Plum Branch	Plum Branch	
SC	AK 502.9	McCormick	McCormick	junction with Anderson Branch
SC	AK 509.5	Troy	Troy	
SC	AK 513.8		Bradley	
SC	AK 523.3		Salak	
SC	AK 524.8		Maxwell	
SC	AK 527.8	Greenwood	Greenwood	junction with: Georgia, Carolina and Northern Railway (SAL); Greenville and Columbia Railroad (SOU); Georgia and Florida Railroad
SC	AK 534.3		Coronaca	
SC	AK 542.1		Waterloo	
SC	AK 553.8		Irby	
SC	AK 554.7	Laurens	Laurens	junction with: Greenville Branch; Columbia, Newberry and Laurens Railroad
SC	AK 561.6		Ora	
SC	AK 566.7		Enoree	
SC	AK 570.1		Kilgore	
SC	AK 574.4	Woodruff	Woodruff	
SC	AK 580.2		Switzer	
SC	AK 582.8		Moore	
SC	AK 586.7		Roebuck	
SC	AK 592.7	Spartanburg	Spartanburg	junction with: Richmond and Danville Railroad (SOU); Atlanta and Charlotte Air Line Railway (SOU)

Anderson Branch
Milepost	City/Location	Station	Connections and notes
AKH 502.9	McCormick	McCormick	junction with Main Line
AKH 510.8		Bordeaux	
AKH 515.1		Willington	
AKH 519.2		Mount Carmel	
AKH 527.6	Calhoun Falls	Calhoun Falls	junction with Georgia, Carolina and Northern Railway (SAL)
AKH 537.8	Lowndesville	Lowndesville	
AKH 545.5	Iva	Iva	
AKH 551.2	Starr	Starr	
AKH 553.1		Deans	
AKH 561.4	Anderson	Anderson	junction with Blue Ridge Railway

Greenville Branch
Milepost	City/Location	Station	Connections and notes
AKJ 554.7	Laurens	Laurens	junction with Main Line
AKJ 558.9		Doubling	
AKJ 561.8		Barksdale	
AKJ 565.1	Gray Court	Gray Court	
AKJ 566.8		Owings	
AKJ 572.6	Fountain Inn	Fountain Inn	
AKJ 577.3	Simpsonville	Simpsonville	
AKJ 582.9	Mauldin	Mauldin	
AKJ 590.7	Greenville	Greenville	junction with: Piedmont and Northern Railway; Atlanta and Charlotte Air Line Railway (SOU)
