= Port Royal and Western Carolina Railway =

Overview
- Locale: Georgia and South Carolina, USA
- Dates of operation: 1886–1896
- Predecessor: Merger of: Augusta and Knoxville Railroad; Greenwood, Laurens and Spartanburg Railroad; Greenville and Laurens Railroad; Savannah Valley Railroad
- Successor: Charleston and Western Carolina Railway

Technical
- Track gauge: 4 ft 9 in (1,448 mm)
- Length: 229 mi (369 km)

The Port Royal and Western Carolina Railway (PR&WC) was a railroad company in the southern United States that operated on 229 miles (369 km) of 4 ft 9 in (1,448 mm) gauge track. It was formed in 1886 by the merger of the Augusta and Knoxville Railroad, Greenwood, Laurens and Spartanburg Railroad, Savannah Valley Railroad and the Greenville and Laurens Railroad, which then joined with Port Royal and Augusta Railway.

The Port Royal and Western Carolina, and Port Royal and Augusta were operated as part of the Central of Georgia Railroad line until the South Carolina General Assembly forced the railroad to give up the lines. The Charleston and Western Carolina Railway was formed in 1896 to operate the two lines.

The Atlantic Coast Line Railroad took over the Charleston and Western Carolina in 1897 but operated it as a subsidiary until 1959 when it was fully absorbed by the Atlantic Coast Line.
