= Greenville and Laurens Railroad =

The Greenville and Laurens Railroad was a railroad that served the South Carolina Upstate region in the late 19th century.

The Greenville and Laurens was chartered in 1878 and arrived in Greenville in 1882.

In 1886, the line merged with three other regional railroads to became part of the Port Royal and Western Carolina Railway.
