= List of governors of dependent territories in the 17th century =

This is a list of territorial governors in the 17th century (1601–1700) AD, such as the administrators of colonies, protectorates, or other dependencies. Where applicable, native rulers are also listed.

A dependent territory is normally a territory that does not possess full political independence or sovereignty as a sovereign state yet remains politically outside of the controlling state's integral area. The administrators of uninhabited territories are excluded.

== Denmark-Norway ==
Danish West India Company, Denmark–Norway
Danish colonial empire
- Monarchs

- Danish West Indies

- Governors of St. Thomas

- Erik Nielson Smit, Governor (1665–1666)
- Kjeld Jensen Slagelse, Governor (c.1666)
- Jørgen Iversen Dyppel, Governor (1672–1680)
- Nicolai Esmit, Governor (1680–1682)
- Adolph Esmit, Governor (1682–1684)

- Governors of St. Thomas and St. John

- Gabriel Milan, Governor (1684–1686)
- Mikkel Mikkelsen, Interim Governor (1686)
- Christopher Heins, Governor (1686–1687)
- Adolph Esmit, Interim Governor (1687–1688)
- Christopher Heins, Governor (1688–1689)
- Johan Lorensen, Governor (1689–1692)
- Frans de la Vigne, Governor (1692–1693)
- Johan Lorensen, Governor (1693–1702)

== England ==
Kingdom of England
English overseas possessions
- Monarchs

=== British Isles ===
- Guernsey, Crown dependency

- British monarchs are the Dukes of Normandy
- Governors

- Thomas Leighton, Governor (1570–1609)
- George Carew, Governor (1610–1621)
- Henry Danvers, Governor (1621–1644)
- Robert Rich, Governor (1643–1644)
- Peter Osborne, Governor (1644–1649)
- Henry Percy, Governor (1649–1650)
- Alban Coxe, Governor (1649–1650)
- John Bingham, Governor (1651–1660)
- Henry Wanseye, Governor (1660)
- Hugh Pollard, Governor (1660–1662)
- Christopher Hatton, 1st Baron Hatton, Governor (1662–1665)
- Jonathan Atkins, Governor (1665–1670)
- Christopher Hatton, 1st Viscount Hatton, Governor (1670–1706)
- Colonel Mordaunt, Governor (1697)

- Bailiffs

- Amice de Carteret, Bailiff (1601–1631)
- Jean de Quetteville, Bailiff (1631–1643)
- Pierre de Beauvoir, Bailiff (1644–1651, 1652–1653, 1656–1660)
- Amias Andros, Bailiff (1661–1674)
- Edmund Andros, Bailiff (1674–1713)

- Kingdom of Ireland, effectively a client state of England/Scotland

- English monarchs are the Monarchs of Ireland
- Lord Lieutenant of Ireland

- The Lord Mountjoy (Lord Deputy): 21 January 1600
- The Lord Mountjoy (Lord Lieutenant): 25 April 1603
- Sir Arthur Chichester: 15 October 1604
- Sir Oliver St John: 2 July 1616
- Henry Cary, 1st Viscount Falkland: 18 September 1622
- Lords Justices: 8 August 1629
- The Viscount Wentworth later The Earl of Strafford: 3 July 1633 (executed May 1641)
- The Earl of Leicester (Lord Lieutenant): 14 June 1641
- The Marquess of Ormonde: 13 November 1643 (appointed by the king)
- Viscount Lisle: 9 April 1646 (appointed by parliament, commission expired 15 April 1647)
- The Marquess of Ormonde: 30 September 1648 (appointed by the King)
- Oliver Cromwell (Lord Lieutenant): 22 June 1649
- Henry Ireton (Lord Deputy): 2 July 1650 (d. 20 November 1651)
- Charles Fleetwood (Lord Deputy): 9 July 1652
- Henry Cromwell (Lord Deputy): 17 November 1657
- Henry Cromwell (Lord Lieutenant): 6 October 1658, resigned 15 June 1659
- Edmund Ludlow (Commander-in-Chief): 4 July 1659
- The Duke of Albemarle: June 1660
- The Duke of Ormonde: 21 February 1662
- The Earl of Ossory (Lord Deputy): 7 February 1668
- The Lord Robartes: 3 May 1669
- The Lord Berkeley of Stratton: 4 February 1670
- The Earl of Essex: 21 May 1672
- The Duke of Ormonde: 24 May 1677
- The Earl of Arran: 13 April 1682
- The Duke of Ormonde: 19 August 1684
- Lords Justices: 24 February 1685
- The Earl of Clarendon: 1 October 1685
- The Earl of Tyrconnell (Lord Deputy): 8 January 1687
- King James II himself in Ireland: 12 March 1689 – 4 July 1690
- King William III himself in Ireland: 14 June 1690
- Lords Justices: 5 September 1690
- The Viscount Sydney: 18 March 1692
- Lords Justices: 13 June 1693
- The Lord Capell (Lord Deputy): 9 May 1695
- Lords Justices: 16 May 1696

=== Caribbean ===
- Colony of the Bahamas

- Governors

- William Sayle, Governor of Eleuthera (1648–1657)
- Hugh Wentworth, Governor (1671)
- John Wentworth, Governor (1671–1676)
- Charles Chillingworth, Governor (1676–1677)
- Roger Clarke, Governor (1680–1682)
- Richard Lilburne, Governor (1684)
- Thomas Bridges, Governor (1686–1690)
- Cadwallader Jones, Governor (1690–1693)
- Nicholas Trott, Governor (1694–1696)
- Nicholas Webb, Governor (1697–1699)
- Read Elding, Acting Governor (1699–1700)
- Elias Haskett, Governor (1700–1701)

- Colony of Barbados

- Governors

- Henry Powell, Governor (1627–1628)
- William Deane, Governor (1628)
- Charles Wolferston, Governor (1628–1629)
- John Powell, Governor (1629)
- Robert Wheatley, Governor Acting (1629)
- William Tufton, Governor (1629–1630)
- Henry Hawley, Governor (1630–1640)
- Richard Peers, Acting Governor (1633–1634)
- William Hawley, Acting Governor (1638–1639)
- Henry Huncks, Governor (1640–1641)
- Philip Bell, Governor (1641–1650)
- Francis Willoughby, Governor (1650–1651), Governor in dissidence (1651–1652)
- George Ayscue, Governor (1651–1652)
- Daniel Searle, Acting Governor (1652–1660)
- Thomas Modyford, Acting Governor (1660–1660)
- Humphrey Walrond, Acting Governor (1660–1663)
- Francis Willoughby, Governor (1663–1666)
- Henry Willoughby, Acting for Willoughby (1664), Acting Governor (1666–1667)
- William Willoughby, Acting Governor (1667)
- Samuel Barwick, Acting Governor (1667)
- Henry Hawley, Acting Governor (1667)
- William Willoughby, Governor (1667–1673)
- Christopher Codrington, Acting for Willoughby (1668–1669)
- Peter Colleton, Acting Governor (1673–1674)
- Jonathan Atkins, Governor (1674–1679)
- John Witham, Acting Governor (1680–1683)
- Richard Dutton, Governor (1683–1685)
- Edwyn Stede, Acting Governor (1685–1690)
- James Kendall, Governor (1690–1694)
- Francis Russell, Governor (1694–1696)
- Francis Bond, Acting Governor (1696–1697)
- Ralph Grey, Governor (1697–1701)

- Colony of Jamaica

- Commanders, Governors

- William Penn, Commander (1655)
- Robert Venables, Commander (1655)
- Edward D'Oyley, Commander (1655–1656)
- William Brayne, Commander (1656–1657)
- Edward D'Oyley, Commander (1657–1661), Governor (1661–1662)
- Thomas Hickman-Windsor, Governor (1662)
- Charles Lyttelton, Acting Deputy governor (1662–1663)
- Thomas Lynch, Acting Deputy governor (1663–1664)
- Edward Morgan, Deputy governor (1664)
- Thomas Modyford, Deputy governor (1664–1671)
- Thomas Lynch, Lieutenant governor (1671–1674)
- Henry Morgan, Acting Lieutenant governor (1674–1675)
- John Vaughan, Lieutenant governor (1675–1678)
- Henry Morgan, Acting Lieutenant governor (1678)
- Charles Howard, Lieutenant governor (1678–1680)
- Henry Morgan, Acting Lieutenant governor (1680–1682)
- Thomas Lynch, Lieutenant governor (1682–1684)
- Hender Molesworth, Acting Lieutenant governor (1684–1687)
- Christopher Monck, Lieutenant governor (1687–1688)
- Hender Molesworth, Acting Lieutenant governor (1688–1689)
- Francis Watson, Acting Lieutenant governor (1689–1690)
- William O'Brien, Governor (1690–1692)
- John White, Acting Governor (1691–1692)
- John Bourden, Acting Governor (1692–1693)
- William Beeston, Acting Governor (1693–1699), Governor (1699–1702)

=== Mediterranean ===
- English Tangier

- Governors

- Henry Mordaunt, Governor (1662–1663)
- Andrew Rutherford, Governor (1663–1664)
- Tobias Bridge, Acting Governor (1664)
- John Fitzgerald, Governor (1664–1665)
- John, Governor (1665–1666)
- Henry Norwood, Governor (1666–1669)
- John Middleton, Governor (1669–1670)
- Hugh Chomondeley, Acting Governor (1670–1672)
- John Middleton, Governor (1672–1674)
- unspecified Acting Governor (1674–1675)
- William O'Brien, Governor (1675–1680)
- Palmes Fairbourne, Governor (1680)
- Thomas Butler, Governor (1680)
- Charles FitzCharles, 1st Earl of Plymouth, Governor (1680)
- Edward Sackville, Governor (1680–1681)
- Percy Kirke, Governor (1681–1683)
- George Legge, Governor (1683–1684)

=== North America ===
- Albemarle Settlements

- Governors

- William Drummond, Governor (1664–1667)
- Samuel Stephens, Governor (1667–1669)
- Peter Carteret, Governor (1670–1672)
- John Jenkins, Governor (1672–1675)
- Thomas Eastchurch, Governor (1675–1676)
- John Jenkins, Governor (1676–1677)
- Thomas Miller, Governor (1677–1677)
- John Harvey, Governor (1679–1679)
- John Jenkins, Governor (1680–1681)
- Seth Sothel, Governor (1682–1689)

- Avalon Peninsula, Newfoundland

- Governors

- John Guy, Proprietary governor of Cuper's Cove (1610–1614)
- John Mason, Proprietary governor of Cuper's Cove (1615–1621)
- Robert Hayman, Proprietary governor of Bristol's Hope (1618–1628)
- Richard Whitbourne, Proprietary governor of Renews (1618–1620)
- Francis Tanfield, Proprietary governor of South Falkland (1623–1626)
- Edward Wynne, Proprietary governor of Ferryland (1621–1625)
- Arthur Aston, Proprietary governor of Avalon (1625–1627)
- George Calvert, Proprietary governor of Avalon (1627–1629)
- Cecilius Calvert (Note: The Lord Baltimore became the de facto Governor of Avalon upon the death of his father, the first Baron Baltimore.), de facto Proprietary governor (1629–1632)
- William Hill, Proprietary governor of Avalon (1634–1638)
- David Kirke, Proprietary governor of Newfoundland (1638–1651)
- John Treworgie, Proprietary governor of Newfoundland (1653–1660)

- Province of Carolina

- Governors

- Philip Ludwell, Governor (1689–1693)
- Thomas Smith, Governor (1693–1694)
- Joseph Blake, Governor (1694)
- John Archdale, Governor (1695–1696)
- Joseph Blake, Governor (1696–1700)
- James Moore, Governor (1700–1703)

- Deputy governors, for the northern Carolina

- John Gibbs, Deputy governor (1689–1690)
- Thomas Jarvis, Deputy governor (1690–1694)
- Thomas Harvey, Deputy governor (1694–1699)
- Henderson Walker, Deputy governor (1699–1703)

- Charles Town

- Governors

- William Sayle, Governor (1670–1671)
- Joseph West, Governor (1671–1672)
- John Yeamans, Governor (1672–1674)
- Joseph West, Governor (1674–1682)
- Joseph Morton, Governor (1682–1684)
- Richard Kyrle, Governor (1684)
- Joseph West, Governor (1684–1685)
- Robert Quary, Governor (1685)
- Joseph Morton, Governor (1685–1686)
- James Colleton, Governor (1686–1690)
- Seth Sothell, Governor (1690–1692)

- Connecticut Colony

- Governors

- John Haynes, Governor (1639–1640)
- Edward Hopkins, Governor (1640–1641)
- John Haynes, Governor (1641–1642)
- George Wyllys, Governor (1642–1643)
- John Haynes, Governor (1643–1644)
- Edward Hopkins, Governor (1644–1645)
- John Haynes, Governor (1645–1646)
- Edward Hopkins, Governor (1646–1647)
- John Haynes, Governor (1647–1648)
- Edward Hopkins, Governor (1649–1650)
- John Haynes, Governor (1650–1651)
- Edward Hopkins, Governor (1651–1652)
- John Haynes, Governor (1652–1653)
- Edward Hopkins, Governor (1653–1654)
- John Haynes, Governor (1654–1655)
- Edward Hopkins, Governor (1655–1656)
- Thomas Welles, Governor (1655–1656)
- John Webster, Governor (1656–1657)
- John Winthrop the Younger, Governor (1657–1658)
- Thomas Welles, Governor (1658–1659)
- John Winthrop the Younger, Governor (1659–1676)
- William Leete, Governor (1676–1683)
- Robert Treat, Governor (1683–1687)
- Edmund Andros, Governor (1687–1689
- Robert Treat, Governor (1689–1698)
- Fitz-John Winthrop, Governor (1698–1707)

- Province of Maryland

- Governors

- William Stone, Governor (1634–1647)
- Benjamin Tasker, Sr., Governor (1647–1649)
- Leonard Calvert, Governor (1649–1656)
- Josias Fendall, Governor (1657–1660)
- Thomas Lawrence, Governor (1660)
- Charles Calvert, 3rd Baron Baltimore, Governor (1661–1676)
- John Coode, Governor (1676)
- Thomas Notley, Governor (1676–1679)
- Charles Calvert, 3rd Baron Baltimore, Governor (1679–1684)
- Benedict Calvert, Governor (1684–1688)
- Benedict Leonard Calvert, Governor (1688–1689)
- John Hart, Governor (1689–1690)
- Nehemiah Blakiston, Governor (1691–1692)
- Thomas Greene, Governor (1692–1693)
- Lionel Copley, Governor (1693–1694)
- Edward Lloyd, Governor (1693)
- Nicholas Greenberry, Governor (1693–1694)
- Edmund Andros, Governor (1694)
- Edmund Andros, Governor (1694)
- Francis Nicholson, Governor (1694–1699)
- Nathaniel Blakiston, Governor (1699–1702)

- Massachusetts Bay Colony

- Governors

- Matthew Cradock, Governor (1628–1629)
- John Endecott, Governor (1629–1630)
- John Winthrop, Governor (1629–1634)
- Thomas Dudley, Governor (1630–1634)
- Thomas Dudley, Governor (1634–1635)
- John Haynes, Governor (1635–1636)
- Henry Vane the Younger, Governor (1636–1637)
- John Winthrop, Governor (1637–1640)
- Thomas Dudley, Governor (1640–1641)
- Richard Bellingham, Governor (1641–1642)
- John Winthrop, Governor (1642–1644)
- John Endecott, Governor (1644–1645)
- Thomas Dudley, Governor (1645–1646)
- John Winthrop, Governor (1646–1649)
- John Endecott, Governor (1649–1650)
- Thomas Dudley, Governor (1650–1651)
- John Endecott, Governor (1651–1654)
- Richard Bellingham, Governor (1654–1655)
- John Endecott, Governor (1655–1665)
- Richard Bellingham, Governor (1665–1672)
- John Leverett, Governor (1671–72)
- John Leverett, Acting Governor (1672–1673), Governor (1673–1679)
- Simon Bradstreet, Governor (1678–1679)
- Simon Bradstreet, Governor (1679–1686)
- Dominion of New England (1686–1689)
- Simon Bradstreet, Governor (1689–1692)

- Province of Massachusetts Bay

- Governors

- William Phips, Governor (1692–1694)
- William Stoughton, Acting Governor (1694–1699)
- Richard Coote, 1st Earl of Bellomont, Governor (1699–1700)
- William Stoughton, Acting Governor (1700–1701)

- New Albion

- Governors

- Edmund Plowden, Governor and Captain general (1634–1649)

- Province of New Hampshire

- Governors

- Walter Neale, Governor (1630–1633)
- Francis Norton, Governor (1634?–1641)
- Henry Josselyn, Governor (1634–1638)
- Francis Norton, Governor (1638–1640?)
- Thomas Wiggin, Governor (1633?–1637)
- George Burdett, Governor (1637–1641)
- Massachusetts Bay Colony (1641–1680)
- John Cutt, President (1680–1681)
- Richard Waldron, Acting President (1681–1682)
- Edward Cranfield, Governor (1682–1685)
- Walter Barefoote, Acting Governor (1685–1686)
- Dominion of New England (1686–1689)
- Samuel Allen, Governor (1691/2–1699)
- Richard Coote, 1st Earl of Bellomont, Governor (1697–1701/2)

- New England

- Governors

- Robert Gorges, Governor general (1623–1624)

- Dominion of New England

- Governors

- Joseph Dudley, President of the Council (1686)
- Edmund Andros, Governor (1686–1689)

- New Haven Colony

- Governors

- Theophilus Eaton, Governor (1639–1658)
- Francis Newman, Governor (1658–1660)
- William Leete, Governor (1661–1665)

- East Jersey

- Governors

- Andrew Hamilton, Governor (1692–1697)
- Jeremiah Basse, Governor (1698–1699)
- Andrew Hamilton, Governor (1699–1702)

- West Jersey

- Governors

- Andrew Hamilton, Governor (1692–1697)
- Jeremiah Basse, Governor (1698–1699)
- Andrew Bowne, Governor (1699)
- Andrew Hamilton, Governor (1699–1702)

- Province of New York

- Governors

- Benjamin Fletcher, Governor (1692–1697)
- Richard Coote, Governor (1698–1701)

- Plymouth Colony

- Governors

- John Carver, Governor (1620–1621)
- William Bradford, Governor (1621–1633)
- Edward Winslow, Governor (1633–1634)
- Thomas Prence, Governor (1634–1635)
- William Bradford, Governor (1635–1636)
- Edward Winslow, Governor (1636–1637)
- William Bradford, Governor (1637–1638)
- Thomas Prence, Governor (1638–1639)
- William Bradford, Governor (1639–1644)
- Edward Winslow, Governor (1644–1645)
- William Bradford, Governor (1645–1657)
- Thomas Prence, Governor (1657–1673)
- Josiah Winslow, Governor (1673–1680)
- Thomas Hinckley, Governor (1680–1686)
- William Bradford the Younger, Governor (1682–1686)
- Dominion of New England (1686–1689)
- Thomas Hinckley, Governor (1689–1692)

- Popham Colony

- Governors

- George Popham, Governor (1607)
- Raleigh Gilbert, Governor (1608)

- Colony of Rhode Island and Providence Plantations

- Magistrates

- William Coddington, Judge of Portsmouth (1638–1639)
- William Hutchinson, Judge of Portsmouth (1639–1640)
- William Coddington, Judge of Newport (1639–1640)
- William Rosales, Governor of Portsmouth and Newport (1640–1647)
- Roger Williams, Chief officer (1644–1647)
- John Coggeshall, President (1647)
- Jeremy Clarke, President (1648–1649)
- John Smith, President (1649–1650)
- Nicholas Easton, President (1650–1651)
- Samuel Gorton, President, Providence and Warwick only (1651–1652)
- John Smith, President, Providence and Warwick only (1652–1653)
- Gregory Dexter, President, Providence and Warwick only (1653–1654)
- Nicholas Easton, President (1654–1654)
- Roger Williams, President (1654–1657)
- Benedict Arnold, President (1657–1660)
- William Brenton, President (1660–1662)
- Benedict Arnold, President (1662–1663)
- William Coddington, Governor (1651–1653)
- John Sanford, Governor (1653–1653)
- Benedict Arnold, Governor (1663–1666)
- William Brenton, Governor (1666–1669)
- Benedict Arnold, Governor (1669–1672)
- Nicholas Easton, Governor (1672–1674)
- William Coddington, Governor (1674–1676)
- Walter Clarke, Governor (1676–1677)
- Benedict Arnold, Governor (1677–1678)
- William Coddington, Governor (1678)
- John Cranston, Governor (1678–1680)
- Peleg Sanford, Governor (1680–1683)
- William Coddington, Jr., Governor (1683–1685)
- Henry Bull, Governor (1685–1686)
- Walter Clarke, Governor (1686)
- Dominion of New England (1686–1689)
- Henry Bull, Governor (1690–1690)
- John Easton, Governor (1690–1695)
- Caleb Carr, Governor (1695–1695)
- Walter Clarke, Governor (1696–1698)
- Samuel Cranston, Governor (1698–1727)

- Saybrook Colony

- Governors

- John Winthrop the Younger, Governor (1635–1639)
- George Fenwick, Governor (1639–1644)

- Colony of Virginia

- Governors

- Edward Maria Wingfield, President of the Council (1607)
- John Ratcliffe, President of the Council (1608)
- Matthew Scrivener, Governor (1608)
- John Smith, President of the Council (1608–1609)
- The Honourable George Percy, President of the Council (1609–1610)
- Thomas West, Governor (1609–1618)

- Thomas Gates, Deputy Governor (1610)
- The Honourable George Percy, Deputy Governor (1611)
- Thomas Dale, Acting Governor (May–August 1611)
- Thomas Gates, Acting Governor (1611–1613)
- Thomas Dale, Acting Governor (1613–1616)
- George Yeardley, Lieutenant Governor (1616–1617)
- Samuel Argall, Lieutenant Governor (1617–1619)

- George Yeardley, Governor (1619–1621)
- Francis Wyatt, Governor (1621–1624)
- Francis Wyatt, Governor (1624–1626)
- George Yeardley, Governor (1626–1627)
- Francis West, Acting Governor (1627–1629)
- John Harvey, Governor (1628–1639)

- John Pott, Acting Governor (1629–1630)
- John West, Acting Governor (1635–1636)
- George Reade, Acting Governor (1638–1639)

- Francis Wyatt, Governor (1639–1642)
- William Berkeley, Governor (1642–1652)

- Richard Kemp, Acting Governor (1644–1645)

- Richard Bennett, Governor (1652–1655)
- Edward Digges, Governor (1655–1656)
- Samuel Mathews, Governor (1656–1660)
- William Berkeley, Governor (1660–1677)

- Francis Moryson, Lieutenant Governor (1661–1662)

- Herbert Jeffries, Governor (1677–1678)
- Thomas Culpeper, Governor (1677–1683)

- Henry Chicheley, Lieutenant Governor (1678–1680)

- Nicholas Spencer, Acting Governor (1683–1684)
- Francis Howard, Governor (1684–1692)
- Joseph Bridger, Governor (1684)

- Nathaniel Bacon, President of the Council (1688–1690)
- Francis Nicholson, Lieutenant Governor (1690–1692)

- Edmund Andros, Governor (1692–1698)
- George Hamilton, Governor (1698–1737)

- Francis Nicholson, Lieutenant Governor (1698–1705)

- Wessagusset Colony

- Governors

- Richard Greene, Governor (1622)
- John Sanders, Governor (1622)

=== Oceania ===
- Bermuda

- Governors

- Richard Moore, Governor (1612–1616)
- Daniel Tucker, Governor (1616–1619)
- Nathaniel Butler, Governor (1619–1622)
- John Bernard, Governor (1622)
- John Harrison, Governor (1622–1623)
- Henry Woodhouse, Governor (1623–1626)
- Philip Bell, Governor (1626–1629)
- Roger Wood, Governor (1629–1637)
- Thomas Chaddock, Governor (1637–1641)
- William Sayle, Governor (1641–1642)
- Josias Forster, Governor (1642–1643)
- William Sayle, Governor (1643–1645)
- Josias Forster, Governor (1645)
- Triumvirate, Governor (1645–1647)
- Thomas Turner, Governor (1647–1649)
- John Trimingham, Governor (1649–1650)
- Josias Forster, Governor (1650–1659)
- William Sayle, Governor (1659–1663)
- Florentius Seymour, Governor (1663–1668)
- Samuel Whalley, Governor (1668–1669)
- John Heydon, Governor (1669–1681)
- Florentius Seymour, Governor (1681–1682)
- Henry Durham, Acting Governor (1682–1683)
- Richard Coney, Governor (1683–1687)
- Richard Robinson, Governor (1687–1690)
- Isaac Richier, Governor (1691–1693)
- John Goddard, Governor (1693–1698)
- Samuel Day, Governor (1698–1700)

== France ==
Ancien Régime of France
French colonial empire
- Heads of state
- Prime ministers

Caribbean

- French Grenada

- Governors

- Jean Le Comte, Governor (1649–1654)
- Louis Cacqueray de Valminière, Governor (1654–1658)
- Dubuc, Governor (1658)
- Jean Faudoas de Cérillac, Governor (1658–1664)
- Vincent, Governor (1664–1670)
- Louis de Canchy de Lerole, Governor (1671–1674)
- Pierre de Sainte-Marthe de Lalande, Governor (1675–1679)
- Jacques de Chambly, Governor (1679–1680)
- Nicholas de Gabaret, Governor (1680–1689)
- Louis Ancelin de Gemostat, Governor (1690–1695)
- Jean-Léon Fournier de Carles de Pradine, Governor (1695?–1696?)
- De Bellair de Saint-Aignan, Governor (1696–1700)

North America

- New France

- Lieutenant generals

- Marquis de la Roche-Mesgouez, Lieutenant general (1598–1603)
- Pierre Dugua, Sieur de Monts, Lieutenant general (1603–1610)
- Charles de Bourbon, comte de Soissons, Lieutenant general (1611–1612)
- Henry II, Prince of Condé, Lieutenant general (1612–1616)
- Pons de Lauzière, Marquis de Thémines de Cardillac, Lieutenant general (1616–1620)
- Henry II, Prince of Condé, Lieutenant general (1620)
- Henri II de Montmorency, Lieutenant general (1620–1625)
- Henri de Lévis, duc de Ventadour, Lieutenant general (1625–1626)
- Cardinal Richelieu, Lieutenant general (1626–1627), Governor (1627–1632)

- Governors (See also)

- Cardinal Richelieu, Lieutenant general (1626–1627), Governor (1627–1632)
- Samuel de Champlain, Governor (1632–1635)
- Charles de Montmagny, Governor (1635–1648)
- Louis d'Ailleboust de Coulonge, Governor (1648–1651)
- Jean de Lauson, Governor (1651–1657)
- Pierre de Voyer d'Argenson, Vicomte de Mouzay, Governor (1657–1661)
- Pierre Dubois Davaugour, Governor (1661–1663)

- Governors general (See also)

- Augustin de Saffray de Mésy, Governor general (1663–1665)
- Daniel de Rémy de Courcelle, Governor general (1665–1672)
- Louis de Buade de Frontenac, Governor general (1672–1682)
- Antoine Lefèbvre de La Barre, Governor general (1682–1685)
- Jacques-René de Brisay de Denonville, Marquis de Denonville, Governor general (1685–1689)
- Louis de Buade de Frontenac, Governor general (1689–1698)
- Louis-Hector de Callière, Governor general (1698–1703)

- Placentia, Newfoundland

- Governors

- Sieur de Kéréon, Governor (1655–1660)
- Nicolas Gargot de la Rochette, Governor (1660–1662)
- Thalour Du Perron, Governor (1662–1663)
- Lafontaine Bellot, Governor (1664–1667)
- Sieur de la Palme, Governor (1667–1670)
- Sieur de la Poippe, Governor (1670–1684)
- Antoine Parat, Governor (1685–1690)
- Louis de Pastour de Costebelle, Governor (1690–1691)
- Jacques-François de Monbeton de Brouillan, Governor (1690–1701)
- Joseph de Monic, Governor (1697–1702)

== Netherlands ==
Dutch Republic
Dutch colonial empire
- Monarchs

Africa

- Dutch Loango-Angola

- Governors

- Pieter Moorthamer, Director (1641–1642)
- Cornelis Hendrikszoon Ouman, Director (1642–1648)

Asia

- Dutch East Indies

- Governors general

- Pieter Both, Governors general (1610–1614)
- Gerard Reynst, Governors general (1614–1615)
- Laurens Reael, Governors general (1615–1619)
- Jan Pieterszoon Coen, Governors general (1619–1623)
- Pieter de Carpentier, Governors general (1623–1627)
- Jan Pieterszoon Coen, Governors general (1627–1629)
- Jacques Specx, Governors general (1629–1632)
- Hendrik Brouwer, Governors general (1632–1636)
- Anthony van Diemen, Governors general (1636–1645)
- Cornelis van der Lijn, Governors general (1645–1650)
- Carel Reyniersz, Governors general (1650–1653)
- Joan Maetsuycker, Governors general (1653–1678)
- Rijckloff van Goens, Governors general (1678–1681)
- Cornelis Speelman, Governors general (1681–1684)
- Johannes Camphuys, Governors general (1684–1691)
- Willem van Outhoorn, Governors general (1691–1704)

- Dutch Formosa

- Governors

- Martinus Sonck, Governor (1624–1625)
- Gerard Frederikszoon de With, Governor (1625–1627)
- Pieter Nuyts, Governor (1627–1629)
- Hans Putmans, Governor (1629–1636)
- Johan van der Burg, Governor (1636–1640)
- Paulus Traudenius, Governor (1640–1643)
- Maximilian le Maire, Governor (1643–1644)
- François Caron, Governor (1644–1646)
- Pieter Anthoniszoon Overtwater, Governor (1646–1650)
- Nicolas Verburg, Governor (1650–1653)
- Cornelis Caesar, Governor (1653–1656)
- Frederick Coyett, Governor (1656–1662)

North America

- New Netherland

- Directors

- Cornelius Jacobsen May, Director general (1624–1625)
- Willem Verhulst, Director general (1625–1626)
- Peter Minuit, Director (1626–1632)
- Sebastiaen Jansen Krol, Director general (1632–1633)
- Wouter Van Twiller, Director general (1633–1638)
- Willem Kieft, Director general (1638–1647)
- Peter Stuyvesant, Director general (1647–1664)
- Anthony Colve, Director general (1673–1674)

South America

- Dutch Brazil

- John Maurice of Nassau, Governor (1637–1643)

== Oman ==
Yaruba dynasty of Oman
- Monarchs

- Mombasa

- Walis

- Imam Sa‘if ibn Sultan, Wali (1698)
- Nasr ibn Abdallah al-Mazru‘i, Wali (1698–1728)

== Portugal ==
Kingdom of Portugal
Portuguese colonial empire
- Monarchs

=== Africa ===
- Portuguese Angola

- Governors

- João Furtado de Mendonça, Governor (1594–1602)
- João Rodrigues Coutinho, Governor (1602–1603)
- Manuel Cerveira Pereira, Governor (1603–1606)
- unknown governor (1606–1607)
- Manuel Pereira Forjaz, Governor (1607–1611)
- Bentro Banha Cardoso, Governor (1611–1615)
- Manuel Cerveira Pereira, Governor (1615–1617)
- Luís Mendes de Vasconcelos, Governor (1617–1621)
- João Correia de Sousa, Governor (1621–1623)
- Pedro de Sousa Coelho, Governor (1623)
- Simão de Mascarenhas, Governor (1623–1624)
- Fernão de Sousa, Governor (1624–1630)
- Manuel Pereira Coutinho, Governor (1630–1635)
- Francisco de Vasconcelos, Governor (1635–1639)
- Pedro César de Meneses, Governor (1639–1645)
- Francisco de Souto-Maior, Governor (1645–1646)
- Triumvirate junta (1646–1648)
- Salvador Correia de Sá, Governor (1648–1651)
- Salvador Correia de Sá, Governor (1648–1651)
- Rodrigo de Miranda Henriques, Governor (1652–1653)
- Bartolomeu de Vasconcelos, Governor (1653–1654)
- Luís Mendes de Sousa, Governor (1654–1658)
- João Fernandes Vieira, Governor (1658–1661)
- André Vidal de Negreiros, Governor (1661–1666)
- Tristão da Cunha, Governor (1666–1667)
- Junta rule (1667–1669)
- Francisco de Távora, Governor (1669–1676)
- Pires de Saldanha, Governor (1676–1680)
- João da Silva e Sousa, Governor (1680–1684)
- Luís Lobo da Silva, Governor (1684–1688)
- João de Lencastre, Governor (1688–1691)
- Gonçalo da Costa, Governor (1691–1694)
- Henrique Jacques de Magalhães, Governor (1694–1697)
- Luís César de Meneses, Governor (1697–1701)

- Portuguese Cape Verde

- Governors

- Fancisco Lobo da Gama, Governor (1597–1603)
- Fernão de Mesquita de Brito, Governor (1603–1606)
- Francisco Correia da Silva, Governor (1606–1611)
- Francisco Martins de Sequeira, Governor (1611–1614)
- Nicolau de Castilho, Governor (1614–1618)
- Francisco de Moura, Governor (1618–1622)
- Francisco Roulim, Governor (1622–1622)
- Manuel Afonso de Guerra, Acting Governor (1622–1624)
- Francisco Vasconcelos da Cunha, Governor (1624–1628)
- João Pereira Corte-Real, Governor (1628–1632)
- Cristóvão de Cabral, Governor (1632–1636)
- Jorge de Castilho, Governor (1636–1639)
- Jerónimo de Cavalcanti e Albuquerque, Governor (1639–1640)
- João Serrão da Cunha, Governor (1640–1645)
- Lourenço Garro, Governor (1645–1646)
- Jorge de Araújo, Governor (1646–1648)
- Roque de Barros do Rêgo, Governor (1648–1648)
- Council of Government (1648–1649)
- Gonçalo de Gamboa Ayala, Governor (1649–1650)
- Pedro Semedo Cardoso, Governor (1650–1651)
- Jorge de Mesquita Castelo Branco, Governor (1651–1653)
- Pedro Ferreira Barreto, Governor (1563–1658)
- Francisco de Figueroa, Governor (1558–1663)
- António Galvão, Governor (1663–1667)
- Manuel da Costa Pessoa, Governor (1667–1671)
- Manuel Pacheco de Melo, Governor (1671–1676)
- João Cardoso Pássaro, Governor (1676–1676)
- Council of Government (1676–1678)
- Manuel da Costa Pessoa, Governor (11678–1683)
- Inácio de Franca Barbosa, Governor (1681–1687)
- Veríssimo Carvalho da Costa, Governor (1687–1688)
- Vitoriano da Costa, Governor (1688–1690)
- Digo Ramires Esquível, Governor (1690–1691)
- Council of Government (1691–1692)
- Manuel António Pinheiro da Câmara, Governor (1692–1696)
- António Gomes Mena, Governor (1696–1696)
- Council of Government (1696–1698)
- António Salgado, Governor (1698–1702)

- Mombasa

- Captains major

- Dau, príncipe de Faza, Captain major (1697–1698)
- Leonardo Barbosa Souto-Maior, Captain major (1698)

- Portuguese Moçambique

- Captains general, Governors

- Álvaro Abranches, Captain general (1598–1601)
- Vasco de Mascarenhas, Captain general (1601–1604)
- Sebastião de Macedo, Captain general (1604–1607)
- Estêvão de Ataíde, Captain general (1607–1609)

- Colony of Moçambique, Sofala, Ríos de Cuama, and Monomatapa under Goa

- Nuno Álvares Pereira, Governor (1609–1611)
- Estévão de Ataíde, Governor (1611–1612)
- Diogo Simões de Madeira, Acting Governor (1612)
- João de Azevedo, Governor (1612–1614)
- Rui de Melo Sampaio, Governor (1614–1618)
- Nuno Álvares Pereira, Governor (1618–1623)
- Lopo de Almeida, Governor (1623–1624)
- Diogo de Sousa de Meneses, Governor (1624–1627)
- Nuno Álvares Pereira, Governor (1627–1631)
- Cristóvão de Brito e Vasconcelos, Acting Governor (1631–1632)
- Diogo de Sousa de Meneses, Governor (1632–1633)
- Filipe de Mascarenhas, Governor (1633–1634)
- Lourenço de Souto-Maior, Governor (1634–1639)
- Diogo de Vasconcelos, Governor (1639–1640)
- António de Brito Pacheco, Governor (1640–1641)
- Francisco da Silveira, Governor (1641–1642)
- Júlio Moniz da Silva, Governor (1642–1646)
- Fernão Dias Baião, Governor (1646–1648)
- Álvaro de Sousa de Távora, Governor (1648–1651)
- Francisco de Mascarenhas, Governor (1651–1652)
- Francisco de Lima, Governor (1652–1657)
- Manuel Corte-Real de Sampaio, Governor (1657–1661)
- Manuel de Mascarenhas, Governor (1661–1664)
- António de Melo e Castro, Governor (1664–1667)
- Inácio Sarmento de Carvalho, Governor (1667–1670)
- João de Sousa Freire, Governor (1670–1673)
- Simão Gomes da Silva, Governor (1673–1674)
- André Pinto da Fonseca, Governor (1674)
- Manuel da Silva, Acting Governor (1674–1676)
- João de Sousa Freire, Governor (1676–1682)
- Caetano de Melo e Castro, Governor (1682–1686)
- Miguel de Almeida, Governor (1686–1689)
- Manuel dos Santos Pinto, Governor (1689–1692)
- Tomé de Sousa Correia, Governor (1692–1693)
- Francisco Correia de Mesquita, Acting Governor (1693–1694)
- Estêvão José da Costa, Governor (1694–1695)
- Francisco da Costa, Governor (1695–1696)
- Luís de Melo Sampaio, Governor (1696–1699)
- Jácome de Morais Sarmento, Governor (1699–1703)

- Portuguese São Tomé

- Governors

- João Barbosa da Cunha, Acting Governor (c.1598–1601)
- António Maciel Monteiro, Acting Governor (1601–1604)
- Pedro de Andrade, Governor (1604–?)
- João Barbosa da Cunha, Acting Governor (?–1609)
- Fernando de Noronha, Governor (1609)
- Constantino Tavares, Governor (1609–1611)
- João Barbosa da Cunha, Acting Governor (1611)
- Francisco Teles de Meneses, Governor (1611)
- Luís Dias de Abreu, Governor (1611–1613)
- Feliciano Carvalho, Governor (1613–1614)
- Luís Dias de Abreu, Governor (1614–1616)
- Miguel Correia Baharem, Governor (1616–1620)
- Pedro da Cunha, Governor (1620–1621)
- Félix Pereira, Governor (1621–1623)
- Jerónimo de Melo Fernando, Governor (1623–1627)
- André Gonçalves Maracote, Governor (1627–1628)
- Lourenço Pires de Távora, Acting Governor (1628–1632)
- Francisco Barreto de Meneses, Governor (1632)
- Lourenço Pires de Távora, Acting Governor (1632–1636)
- António de Carvalho, Governor (1636)
- Lourenço Pires de Távora, Acting Governor (1636–1640)
- Manuel Quaresma Carneiro, Governor (1640)
- Miguel Pereira de Melo e Albuquerque, Acting Governor (1640–1641)
- unspecified Dutch commander (1641–1648)
- Paulo da Ponte, Acting Governor (1641–1642)
- Lourenço Pires de Távora, Governor (1642–c.1650)
- unspecified (c.1650–1656)
- Cristóvão de Barros do Rêgo, Governor (1656–c.1657)
- unspecified (c.1657–c.1661)
- Pedro da Silva, Governor (c.1661–166.)
- unspecified (166.–1669)
- Paulo Ferreira de Noronha, Governor (1669–1671)
- Chamber Senate (1671–1673)
- Julião de Campos Barreto, Governor (1673–1677)
- Bernardim Freire de Andrade, Governor (1677–1680)
- Jacinto de Figueiredo e Abreu, Governor (1680–1683)
- João Álvares da Cunha, Acting Governor (1683–1686)
- António Pereira de Brito Lemos, Governor (1686)
- Bento de Sousa Lima, Governor (1686–1689)
- António Pereira de Lacerda, Governor (1689–1693)
- António de Barredo, Governor (1693–1694)
- José Pereira Sodré, Governor (1695–1696)
- João da Costa Matos, Governor (1696–1697)
- Manuel António Pinheiro da Câmara, Governor (1697–1702)

- Portuguese Tangier

- Governors

- António Pereira Lopes de Berredo, Governor (1599–1605)
- Nunho de Mendonça, Governor (1605–1610)
- Afonso de Noronha, Governor (1610–1614)
- Luís de Meneses, Governor (1614)
- Luís de Noronha, Governor (1614–1615)
- João Coutinho, Governor (1615–1616)
- André Dias da França, Governor (1616–1617)
- Pedro Manuel, Governor (1617–1621)
- André Dias da França, Governor (1621–1622)
- Jorge de Mascarenhas, Governor (1622–1624)
- Miguel de Noronha, Governor (1624–1628)
- Galaaz Fernandes da Silveira, Governor (1628)
- Fernando de Mascarenhas, Governor (1628–1637)
- Rodrigo Lobo da Silveira, Governor (1637–1643)
- André Dias da França, Governor (1643–1645)
- Caetano Coutinho, Governor (1645–1649)
- Luís Lobo, Governor (1649–1653)
- Rodrigo de Lencastre, Governor (1653–1656)
- Fernando de Meneses, 2nd Count of Ericeira, Governor (1656–1661)
- Luís de Almeida, Governor (1661–1662)

=== Asia ===
- Portuguese Macau

- Governors

- Manuel da Camara de Noronha, Governor (1631–1636)
- Diogo de Melo de Castro, Governor (1636–1638)

=== South America ===
- Colonial Brazil

- Governors general

- D. Francisco de Sousa, Governor general (1591–1602)
- Diogo Botelho, Governor general (1603–1607)
- Lourenço da Veiga, Governor general (1607–1613, Bahia)
- Afonso de Albuquerque, Governor general (1608–1613, Rio de Janeiro)
- Diogo de Meneses, Governor general (1608–1612)
- Gaspar de Sousa, Governor general (1612–1617)
- Luís de Sousa, Governor general (1617–1621)

== Spain ==
Habsburg Spain
Spanish colonial empire
Monarchs

=== Caribbean ===
- Captaincy General of Cuba

- Francisco Riaño y Gamboa, Governor of Cuba (1634–1639)

- Colony of Santiago

- Governors

- Fernando Melgarejo Córdoba, Governor (1596–1606)
- Alonso de Miranda, Governor (1607–1611)
- Pedro Espejo Barranco, Governor (1611–1614)
- Andrés González de Vera, Governor (1614–?)
- Sebastián Lorenzo Romano, Governor (1620?)
- Francisco Terril, Governor (1625–1632)
- Juan Martínez Arana, Governor (1632–1637)
- Gabriel Peñalver Angulo, Governor (1637–1639)
- Jacinto Sedeño Albornoz, Governor (1639–1640)
- Francisco Ladrón de Zegama, Governor (1640–1643)
- Alcades, Governor (1643–1645)
- Sebastián Fernández de Gamboa, Governor (1645–1646)
- Pedro Caballero, Governor (1646–1650)
- Jacinto Sedeño Albornoz, Governor (1650)
- Francisco de Proenza, Governor (1650–1651)
- Juan Ramírez de Arellano, Governor (1651–1655)
- Francisco de Proenza, Governor (1655–1656)
- Cristóbal Arnaldo Isasi, Governor (1656–1660)

=== Europe ===
- Naples

- Manuel de Acevedo y Zúñiga, Viceroy of Naples (1631–1637)

- Spanish Netherlands

- Governors

- Isabella Clara Eugenia of Austria, Governor (1621–1633)
- Ferdinand of Austria, Governor (1633–1641)
- Francisco de Melo, Governor (1641–1644)
- Manuel de Moura, Governor (1644–1647)
- Leopold William of Austria, Governor (1647–1656)
- John of Austria the Younger, Governor (1656–1659)
- Luis de Benavides Carrillo, Governor (1659–1664)
- Francisco de Moura, Governor (1664–1668)
- Íñigo Melchor de Velasco, Governor (1668–1670)
- Juan Domingo de Zuñiga y Fonseca, Governor (1670–1675)
- Carlos de Aragón de Gurrea, Governor (1675–1677)
- Alexander Farnese, Governor (1678–1682)
- Ottone Enrico del Caretto, Governor (1682–1685)
- Francisco Antonio de Agurto, Governor (1685–1692)
- Maximilian II Emanuel of Bavaria, Governor (1692–1706)

- Viceroyalty of Sardinia

- Antonio de Urrea, Viceroy (1632–1637)

=== North America ===
- Florida

- Laureano José de Torres Ayala a Duadros Castellanos, Governor of Florida (1693–1699)

- Panama

- Enrique Enríquez de Sotomayor, Royal Governor (1634–1638)

- New Mexico

- Diego de Vargas, Governor of New Mexico (1688–1696)

- New Spain / Viceroyalty of New Spain

- Viceroys (complete list) —

- Gaspar de Zúñiga, (1595–1603)
- Juan de Mendoza, (1603—1607)
- Luis de Velasco, (1590—1595, 1607—1611)
- Fray Francisco García Guerra, archbishop (1611—1612)
- Diego Fernández de Córdoba, (1612—1621)
- Rodrigo Pacheco, (1624—1635)
- Lope Díez de Armendáriz, (1635—1640)
- Diego López Pacheco, (1640—1642)
- Juan de Palafox y Mendoza, bishop and interim archbishop (1642)
- García Sarmiento de Sotomayor, (1642—1648)
- Marcos de Torres y Rueda, bishop (1648—1649)
- Luis Enríquez de Guzmán, (1650—1653)
- Francisco Fernández de la Cueva, (1653—1660)
- Juan Francisco Leiva y de la Cerda, (1660—1664)
- Diego Osorio de Escobar y Llamas, bishop (1664)
- Antonio Sebastián Álvarez de Toledo, (1664—1673)
- Pedro Nuño Colón de Portugal, (1673)
- Payo Enríquez de Rivera, archbishop (1673—1680)
- Tomás de la Cerda, (1680—1686)
- Melchor Portocarrero, (1686—1688)
- Gaspar de la Cerda, (1688—1696)
- Juan Ortega y Montañés, archbishop (1696, 1701—1702)
- José Sarmiento de Valladares, (1696—1701)

=== South America ===
- Captaincy General of Chile

- Juan de la Jaraquemada, Royal Governor of Chile (1611–1612)
- Francisco Laso de la Vega, Governor (1629–1639)
- Tomás Marín de Poveda, 1st Marquis of Cañada Hermosa, Governor (1692–1700)

- Viceroyalty of Peru

- Viceroys

- Luis Jerónimo de Cabrera, Viceroy (1629–1639)
- Melchor Portocarrero, 3rd Count of Monclova, Viceroy (1689–1705)

== Sweden ==
Sweden
Swedish colonies
- Monarchs

- New Sweden

- List of colonial governors of New Jersey#Governors of New Sweden (1638–55)

== See also ==
- List of state leaders in the 17th century
- List of state leaders in the 17th-century Holy Roman Empire
- List of state leaders in 17th-century South Asia
