= List of counties in North Carolina =

Counties of North Carolina
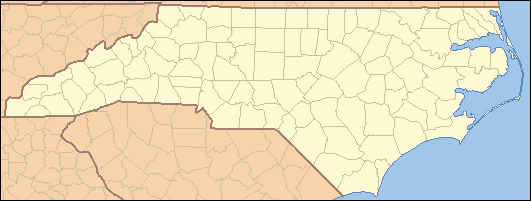
- Location: State of North Carolina
- Number: 100
- Populations: 3,537 (Tyrrell) – 1,257,235 (Wake)
- Areas: 221 square miles (570 km^{2}) (Clay) – 1,542 square miles (3,990 km^{2}) (Dare)
- Government: County government
- Subdivisions: Cities, towns, townships, unincorporated communities, census-designated places

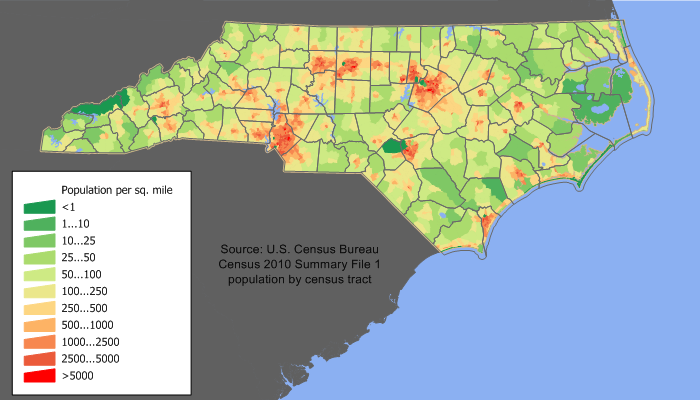
Population density

North Carolina municipalities

The U.S. state of North Carolina is divided into 100 counties. North Carolina ranks 28th in size by area, but has the seventh-highest number of counties in the country.

Following the restoration of the monarchy in 1660, King Charles II rewarded eight persons on March 24, 1663, for their faithful support of his efforts to regain the throne of England. He gave the eight grantees, called Lords Proprietor, the land called Carolina, in honor of King Charles I, his father. The Province of Carolina, from 1663 to 1729, was a North American English (1663–1707), then British (from 1707 union with Scotland) colony. In 1729, the Province of North Carolina became a separate entity from the Province of South Carolina.

The establishment of North Carolina counties stretches over 240 years, beginning in 1668 with the creation of Albemarle County and ending with the 1911 creation of Avery and Hoke counties. Six counties have been divided or abolished altogether, the last being Dobbs County in 1791.

The Federal Information Processing Standard (FIPS), which is used by the United States government to uniquely identify states and counties, is provided with each entry. North Carolina's FIPS code is 37, which when combined with the county code is written as 37XXX.

== List ==
County	FIPS code	County seat	Est.	Origin	Etymology	Pop. (2025)	Area	Map
Alamance County	001	Graham	April 19, 1849	Orange County	The Battle of Alamance which was derived from the local Indian word meaning "blue clay" found in the Great Alamance Creek	186,177	434 sq mi (1,124 km^{2})	State map highlighting Alamance County
Alexander County	003	Taylorsville	January 15, 1847	Caldwell County, Iredell County, and Wilkes County	William J. Alexander (1797–1857), member of the legislature and Speaker of the North Carolina House of Commons	36,958	264 sq mi (684 km^{2})	State map highlighting Alexander County
Alleghany County	005	Sparta	February 1, 1859	Ashe County	Derived from a corruption of the Delaware Indian name for the Allegheny and Ohio Rivers and is said to have meant "a fine stream"	11,479	236 sq mi (611 km^{2})	State map highlighting Alleghany County
Anson County	007	Wadesboro	March 17, 1750	Bladen County	George, Lord Anson (1697–1762), a celebrated English admiral who circumnavigated the globe	21,758	537 sq mi (1,391 km^{2})	State map highlighting Anson County
Ashe County	009	Jefferson	December 23, 1799	Wilkes County	Samuel Ashe (1725–1813), a Revolutionary patriot, superior court judge and governor of North Carolina	27,514	429 sq mi (1,111 km^{2})	State map highlighting Ashe County
Avery County	011	Newland	February 23, 1911	Caldwell County, Mitchell County, and Watauga County	Waightstill Avery (1741–1821), a soldier of the Revolution and Attorney General of North Carolina	18,110	248 sq mi (642 km^{2})	State map highlighting Avery County
Beaufort County	013	Washington	December 3, 1705	Bath County	Henry Somerset, 2nd Duke of Beaufort, who in 1709 became one of the Lords Proprietor	44,670	963 sq mi (2,494 km^{2})	State map highlighting Beaufort County
Bertie County	015	Windsor	October 2, 1722	Chowan County	James or Henry Bertie, two Lords Proprietor of colonial North Carolina	17,086	741 sq mi (1,919 km^{2})	State map highlighting Bertie County
Bladen County	017	Elizabethtown	December 31, 1734	New Hanover County	Martin Bladen (1680–1746), a member of the Board of Trade	30,007	888 sq mi (2,300 km^{2})	State map highlighting Bladen County
Brunswick County	019	Bolivia	March 9, 1764	Bladen County and New Hanover County	George I of Great Britain (1660–1727), Duke of Brunswick and Lüneburg	174,702	1,050 sq mi (2,719 km^{2})	State map highlighting Brunswick County
Buncombe County	021	Asheville	January 19, 1792	Burke County and Rutherford County	Edward Buncombe (1742–1778), a Revolutionary soldier, who was wounded and captured at the Battle of Germantown, and died a paroled prisoner in Philadelphia	277,417	660 sq mi (1,709 km^{2})	State map highlighting Buncombe County
Burke County	023	Morganton	June 1, 1777	Rowan County	Thomas Burke (1747–1783), a member of the Continental Congress and governor of North Carolina	88,655	514 sq mi (1,331 km^{2})	State map highlighting Burke County
Cabarrus County	025	Concord	December 31, 1792	Mecklenburg County	Stephen Cabarrus (1754–1808), member of the legislature and Speaker of the North Carolina House of Commons	249,725	364 sq mi (943 km^{2})	State map highlighting Cabarrus County
Caldwell County	027	Lenoir	January 11, 1841	Burke County and Wilkes County	Joseph Caldwell (1773–1835), the first president of the University of North Carolina	81,105	475 sq mi (1,230 km^{2})	State map highlighting Caldwell County
Camden County	029	Camden	May 9, 1777	Pasquotank County	Charles Pratt, 1st Earl Camden (1714–1794), who opposed the taxation of the American colonists	11,315	310 sq mi (803 km^{2})	State map highlighting Camden County
Carteret County	031	Beaufort	August 8, 1722	Craven County	John Carteret, 2nd Earl Granville (1690–1763), who inherited one-eighth share in the Province of Carolina through his great-grandfather George Carteret	70,469	1,330 sq mi (3,445 km^{2})	State map highlighting Carteret County
Caswell County	033	Yanceyville	June 1, 1777	Orange County	Richard Caswell (1729–1789), member of the first Continental Congress and first governor of North Carolina after the Declaration of Independence	22,563	429 sq mi (1,111 km^{2})	State map highlighting Caswell County
Catawba County	035	Newton	January 14, 1843	Lincoln County	Catawba Indians	170,172	416 sq mi (1,077 km^{2})	State map highlighting Catawba County
Chatham County	037	Pittsboro	April 1, 1771	Orange County	William Pitt, 1st Earl of Chatham (1708–1778), Secretary of State during the French and Indian War and was later Prime Minister of Great Britain	85,111	709 sq mi (1,836 km^{2})	State map highlighting Chatham County
Cherokee County	039	Murphy	January 4, 1839	Macon County	Cherokee Indians	30,830	467 sq mi (1,210 km^{2})	State map highlighting Cherokee County
Chowan County	041	Edenton	December 31, 1671	Albemarle County	Chowan Indian tribe	14,082	234 sq mi (606 km^{2})	State map highlighting Chowan County
Clay County	043	Hayesville	February 20, 1861	Cherokee County	Henry Clay (1777–1852), statesman and orator who represented Kentucky in both the House of Representatives and Senate	12,239	221 sq mi (572 km^{2})	State map highlighting Clay County
Cleveland County	045	Shelby	January 11, 1841	Lincoln County and Rutherford County	Benjamin Cleveland (1738–1806), a colonel in the American Revolutionary War who took part in the Battle of Kings Mountain	103,325	468 sq mi (1,212 km^{2})	State map highlighting Cleveland County
Columbus County	047	Whiteville	December 15, 1808	Bladen County and Brunswick County	Christopher Columbus (1451–1507), navigator, explorer, and one of the first Europeans to explore the Americas	50,487	955 sq mi (2,473 km^{2})	State map highlighting Columbus County
Craven County	049	New Bern	December 3, 1705	Bath County	William, Earl of Craven (1608–1697), who was a Lords Proprietor of colonial North Carolina	105,025	773 sq mi (2,002 km^{2})	State map highlighting Craven County
Cumberland County	051	Fayetteville	February 19, 1754	Bladen County	Prince William, Duke of Cumberland (1721–1765), a military leader and son of George II	338,473	658 sq mi (1,704 km^{2})	State map highlighting Cumberland County
Currituck County	053	Currituck	December 31, 1684	Albemarle County	Traditionally said to be an Indian word for wild geese, also rendered "Coratank"	33,158	526 sq mi (1,362 km^{2})	State map highlighting Currituck County
Dare County	055	Manteo	February 3, 1870	Currituck County, Hyde County, and Tyrrell County	Virginia Dare (b. 1587), the first child born of English parents in America	38,245	1,542 sq mi (3,994 km^{2})	State map highlighting Dare County
Davidson County	057	Lexington	December 9, 1822	Rowan County	William Lee Davidson (1746–1781), an American Revolutionary War general who was mortally wounded at Cowan's Ford	180,182	568 sq mi (1,471 km^{2})	State map highlighting Davidson County
Davie County	059	Mocksville	December 20, 1836	Rowan County	William Richardson Davie (1756–1820), a member of the Federal Convention and governor of North Carolina	45,855	266 sq mi (689 km^{2})	State map highlighting Davie County
Duplin County	061	Kenansville	March 17, 1750	New Hanover County	Thomas Hay, Viscount Dupplin (1710–1787), who was the 9th Earl of Kinnoull	51,571	820 sq mi (2,124 km^{2})	State map highlighting Duplin County
Durham County	063	Durham	April 14, 1881	Orange County and Wake County	The city of Durham, which was named in honor of Dr. Bartlett Snipes Durham, who donated the land on which the earliest parts of the city were built	347,240	298 sq mi (772 km^{2})	State map highlighting Durham County
Edgecombe County	065	Tarboro	April 4, 1741	Bertie County	Richard Edgcumbe, 1st Baron Edgcumbe (1680–1758), a Lord High Treasurer and Paymaster General for Ireland	49,121	507 sq mi (1,313 km^{2})	State map highlighting Edgecombe County
Forsyth County	067	Winston-Salem	January 16, 1849	Stokes County	Benjamin Forsyth (d. 1814), an American officer during the War of 1812	401,718	412 sq mi (1,067 km^{2})	State map highlighting Forsyth County
Franklin County	069	Louisburg	February 12, 1779	Bute County	Benjamin Franklin (1706–1790), an author, politician, statesman, and Founding Father of the United States	82,037	494 sq mi (1,279 km^{2})	State map highlighting Franklin County
Gaston County	071	Gastonia	December 21, 1846	Lincoln County	William Gaston (1778–1844), a United States Congressman and justice of the North Carolina Supreme Court	246,558	364 sq mi (943 km^{2})	State map highlighting Gaston County
Gates County	073	Gatesville	February 12, 1779	Chowan County, Hertford County, and Perquimans County	Horatio Gates (1727–1806), an American general during the Revolution at the Battle of Saratoga	10,234	346 sq mi (896 km^{2})	State map highlighting Gates County
Graham County	075	Robbinsville	January 30, 1872	Cherokee County	William Alexander Graham (1804–1875), a United States Senator, governor of North Carolina, and United States Secretary of the Navy	8,190	302 sq mi (782 km^{2})	State map highlighting Graham County
Granville County	077	Oxford	June 28, 1746	Edgecombe County	John Carteret, 2nd Earl Granville (1690–1763), who inherited one-eighth share in the Province of Carolina through his great-grandfather George Carteret	61,421	538 sq mi (1,393 km^{2})	State map highlighting Granville County
Greene County	079	Snow Hill	January 19, 1792	Dobbs County; Originally named Glasgow County	Nathanael Greene (1742–1786), a major general of the Continental Army in the American Revolutionary War	20,700	267 sq mi (692 km^{2})	State map highlighting Greene County
Guilford County	081	Greensboro	January 26, 1771	Orange County and Rowan County	Francis North, 1st Earl of Guilford (1704–1790), a British politician and father of Prime Minister of Great Britain Frederick North	562,234	658 sq mi (1,704 km^{2})	State map highlighting Guilford County
Halifax County	083	Halifax	January 1, 1759	Edgecombe County	George Montagu-Dunk, 2nd Earl of Halifax (1716–1771), a British statesman and President of the Board of Trade	46,534	730 sq mi (1,891 km^{2})	State map highlighting Halifax County
Harnett County	085	Lillington	February 7, 1855	Cumberland County	Cornelius Harnett (1723–1781), an American Revolutionary and delegate in the Continental Congress	150,137	601 sq mi (1,557 km^{2})	State map highlighting Harnett County
Haywood County	087	Waynesville	December 15, 1808	Buncombe County	John Haywood (1754–1827), a North Carolina State Treasurer	63,369	555 sq mi (1,437 km^{2})	State map highlighting Haywood County
Henderson County	089	Hendersonville	December 15, 1838	Buncombe County	Leonard Henderson (1772–1833), Chief Justice of the North Carolina Supreme Court	122,375	375 sq mi (971 km^{2})	State map highlighting Henderson County
Hertford County	091	Winton	May 1, 1760	Bertie County, Chowan County, and Northampton County	Francis Seymour-Conway, 1st Marquess of Hertford (1718–1794), who was Lord of the Bedchamber to George II and George III	19,015	360 sq mi (932 km^{2})	State map highlighting Hertford County
Hoke County	093	Raeford	February 17, 1911	Cumberland County and Robeson County	Robert Hoke (1837–1912), a Confederate general during the American Civil War	56,939	392 sq mi (1,015 km^{2})	State map highlighting Hoke County
Hyde County	095	Swan Quarter	December 3, 1705	Bath County	Edward Hyde (1667–1712), a governor of colonial North Carolina	4,554	1,459 sq mi (3,779 km^{2})	State map highlighting Hyde County
Iredell County	097	Statesville	December 6, 1788	Rowan County	James Iredell (1751–1799), a comptroller at the port of Edenton and one of the original justices of the Supreme Court of the United States	211,798	597 sq mi (1,546 km^{2})	State map highlighting Iredell County
Jackson County	099	Sylva	January 29, 1851	Haywood County and Macon County	Andrew Jackson (1767–1845), the 7th President of the United States	45,039	495 sq mi (1,282 km^{2})	State map highlighting Jackson County
Johnston County	101	Smithfield	June 28, 1746	Craven County	Gabriel Johnston (1699–1752), a governor of colonial North Carolina	256,448	796 sq mi (2,062 km^{2})	State map highlighting Johnston County
Jones County	103	Trenton	February 12, 1779	Craven County	Willie Jones (1740–1801), opposed the ratification of the United States Constitution and declined an invitation to the Constitutional Convention	9,575	474 sq mi (1,228 km^{2})	State map highlighting Jones County
Lee County	105	Sanford	July 2, 1907	Chatham County and Moore County	Robert E. Lee (1807–1870), a career United States Army officer and general of the Confederate forces during the American Civil War	70,258	259 sq mi (671 km^{2})	State map highlighting Lee County
Lenoir County	107	Kinston	January 19, 1792	Dobbs County	William Lenoir (1751–1839), a captain in the American Revolutionary War who took part in the Battle of Kings Mountain	55,837	401 sq mi (1,039 km^{2})	State map highlighting Lenoir County
Lincoln County	109	Lincolnton	February 12, 1779	Tryon County	Benjamin Lincoln (1733–1810), a major general during the American Revolutionary War who participated in the Siege of Yorktown	98,654	305 sq mi (790 km^{2})	State map highlighting Lincoln County
Macon County	113	Franklin	January 10, 1829	Haywood County	Nathaniel Macon (1758–1837), a member and Speaker of the United States House of Representatives	39,232	520 sq mi (1,347 km^{2})	State map highlighting Macon County
Madison County	115	Marshall	January 27, 1851	Buncombe County and Yancey County	James Madison (1751–1836), the 4th President of the United States	22,553	451 sq mi (1,168 km^{2})	State map highlighting Madison County
Martin County	117	Williamston	March 19, 1774	Halifax County and Tyrrell County	Josiah Martin (1737–1786), the last governor of colonial North Carolina	21,601	457 sq mi (1,184 km^{2})	State map highlighting Martin County
McDowell County	111	Marion	December 19, 1842	Burke County and Rutherford County	Joseph McDowell (1756–1801), a soldier in the American Revolutionary War who took part in the Battle of Kings Mountain	45,198	445 sq mi (1,153 km^{2})	State map highlighting McDowell County
Mecklenburg County	119	Charlotte	February 1, 1763	Anson County	Charlotte of Mecklenburg-Strelitz (1744–1818), the queen consort of George III of the United Kingdom	1,233,383	546 sq mi (1,414 km^{2})	State map highlighting Mecklenburg County
Mitchell County	121	Bakersville	February 16, 1861	Burke County, Caldwell County, McDowell County, Watauga County, and Yancey County	Elisha Mitchell (1793–1857), a professor at the University of North Carolina who measured the height of Mount Mitchell	15,062	222 sq mi (575 km^{2})	State map highlighting Mitchell County
Montgomery County	123	Troy	February 12, 1779	Anson County	Richard Montgomery (1738–1775), a major general during the Revolutionary War who was killed at the Battle of Quebec	26,403	502 sq mi (1,300 km^{2})	State map highlighting Montgomery County
Moore County	125	Carthage	July 4, 1784	Cumberland County	Alfred Moore (1755–1810), a captain in the Revolutionary War and justice of the Supreme Court of the United States	110,619	706 sq mi (1,829 km^{2})	State map highlighting Moore County
Nash County	127	Nashville	December 24, 1777	Edgecombe County	Francis Nash (1742–1777), a brigadier general in the Revolutionary War who was mortally wounded at the Battle of Germantown	99,365	543 sq mi (1,406 km^{2})	State map highlighting Nash County
New Hanover County	129	Wilmington	November 27, 1729	Craven County	The royal family of England, members of the House of Hanover	245,959	329 sq mi (852 km^{2})	State map highlighting New Hanover County
Northampton County	131	Jackson	December 31, 1741	Bertie County	James Compton, 5th Earl of Northampton (1687–1754), a British peer and politician	16,491	551 sq mi (1,427 km^{2})	State map highlighting Northampton County
Onslow County	133	Jacksonville	December 31, 1734	New Hanover County	Arthur Onslow (1691–1768), Speaker of the House of Commons	217,175	905 sq mi (2,344 km^{2})	State map highlighting Onslow County
Orange County	135	Hillsborough	March 31, 1852	Bladen County, Granville County, and Johnston County	Unknown; possibly Prince William V of Orange (1748–1806), the last Stadtholder of the Dutch Republic; or William of Orange (1650–1702), who became King of England after the Glorious Revolution	152,498	401 sq mi (1,039 km^{2})	State map highlighting Orange County
Pamlico County	137	Bayboro	May 2, 1872	Beaufort County and Craven County	Pamlico Sound and the Pamlico Indian tribe	12,758	562 sq mi (1,456 km^{2})	State map highlighting Pamlico County
Pasquotank County	139	Elizabeth City	December 31, 1684	Albemarle County	Derived from the Indian word "pasketanki" which meant "where the current of the stream divides or forks"	42,201	289 sq mi (749 km^{2})	State map highlighting Pasquotank County
Pender County	141	Burgaw	February 16, 1875	New Hanover County	William Dorsey Pender (1834–1863), Confederate soldier who was mortally wounded at the Battle of Gettysburg of the American Civil War	72,111	934 sq mi (2,419 km^{2})	State map highlighting Pender County
Perquimans County	143	Hertford	December 31, 1671	Albemarle County	The Indian word "perquimans" means "land of beautiful women" and was coined by a sect of the Yeopim tribe, later becoming the 'Perquiman'	13,490	329 sq mi (852 km^{2})	State map highlighting Perquimans County
Person County	145	Roxboro	February 1, 1792	Caswell County	Thomas Person (1733–1800), an American Revolutionary War patriot	40,636	404 sq mi (1,046 km^{2})	State map highlighting Person County
Pitt County	147	Greenville	January 1, 1761	Beaufort County	William Pitt, 1st Earl of Chatham (1708–1778), Secretary of State during the French and Indian War and was later Prime Minister of Great Britain	182,936	656 sq mi (1,699 km^{2})	State map highlighting Pitt County
Polk County	149	Columbus	January 18, 1847	Henderson County and Rutherford County	William Polk (1758–1834), officer in the American Revolutionary War and first president of the State Bank of North Carolina	20,533	238 sq mi (616 km^{2})	State map highlighting Polk County
Randolph County	151	Asheboro	February 12, 1779	Guilford County	Peyton Randolph (c. 1721–1755), the first President of the Continental Congress	149,516	790 sq mi (2,046 km^{2})	State map highlighting Randolph County
Richmond County	153	Rockingham	November 10, 1779	Anson County	Charles Lennox, 3rd Duke of Richmond (1735–1806), a firm supporter of the American colonists and advocated removal of British troops	42,041	480 sq mi (1,243 km^{2})	State map highlighting Richmond County
Robeson County	155	Lumberton	January 6, 1787	Bladen County	Thomas Robeson (1740–1785), an officer in the American Revolutionary War	119,941	949 sq mi (2,458 km^{2})	State map highlighting Robeson County
Rockingham County	157	Wentworth	December 29, 1785	Guilford County	Charles Watson-Wentworth, 2nd Marquess of Rockingham (1730–1782), a British statesmen and two-time Prime Minister of Great Britain	94,195	573 sq mi (1,484 km^{2})	State map highlighting Rockingham County
Rowan County	159	Salisbury	March 27, 1753	Anson County	Matthew Rowan (d. 1769), was the acting Governor of colonial North Carolina following the death of Governor Nathaniel Rice	155,096	524 sq mi (1,357 km^{2})	State map highlighting Rowan County
Rutherford County	161	Rutherfordton	February 12, 1779	Tryon County	Griffith Rutherford (c. 1721–1805), an officer in the American Revolutionary War and a political leader in North Carolina	65,745	567 sq mi (1,469 km^{2})	State map highlighting Rutherford County
Sampson County	163	Clinton	June 2, 1784	Duplin County	John Sampson (1719–1784), a member of Josiah Martin's council	61,504	948 sq mi (2,455 km^{2})	State map highlighting Sampson County
Scotland County	165	Laurinburg	February 20, 1899	Richmond County	The country Scotland, part of the United Kingdom	33,322	321 sq mi (831 km^{2})	State map highlighting Scotland County
Stanly County	167	Albemarle	January 11, 1841	Montgomery County	John Stanly (1774–1834), a United States Congressman and Speaker of the North Carolina House of Commons	68,830	405 sq mi (1,049 km^{2})	State map highlighting Stanly County
Stokes County	169	Danbury	December 22, 1789	Surry County	John Stokes(1756–1790), a soldier of the Revolution who was seriously wounded at the Waxhaw massacre	46,126	456 sq mi (1,181 km^{2})	State map highlighting Stokes County
Surry County	171	Dobson	April 1, 1771	Rowan County	The county of Surrey in England, birthplace of then governor William Tryon	72,287	537 sq mi (1,391 km^{2})	State map highlighting Surry County
Swain County	173	Bryson City	February 24, 1871	Jackson County and Macon County	David Lowry Swain (1801–1868), a governor of North Carolina and president of the University of North Carolina	14,024	540 sq mi (1,399 km^{2})	State map highlighting Swain County
Transylvania County	175	Brevard	February 15, 1861	Henderson County and Jackson County	Derived from the Latin words, trans meaning "across" and sylva meaning "woods"	34,211	380 sq mi (984 km^{2})	State map highlighting Transylvania County
Tyrrell County	177	Columbia	November 27, 1729	Chowan County, Currituck County, and Pasquotank County	John Tyrrell (1685–1729), at one time was a Lords Proprietor	3,537	597 sq mi (1,546 km^{2})	State map highlighting Tyrrell County
Union County	179	Monroe	December 19, 1842	Anson County and Mecklenburg County	Created as a compromise after a dispute between local Whigs and Democrats as to whether it should be named Clay or Jackson county	267,674	640 sq mi (1,658 km^{2})	State map highlighting Union County
Vance County	181	Henderson	May 5, 1881	Franklin County, Granville County, and Warren County	Zebulon Baird Vance (1830–1894), a Confederate military officer in the American Civil War, twice governor of North Carolina, and United States Senator	42,638	269 sq mi (697 km^{2})	State map highlighting Vance County
Wake County	183	Raleigh	March 12, 1771	Cumberland County, Johnston County, and Orange County	Margaret Wake (c.1732–1819), the wife of British colonial governor William Tryon	1,257,235	857 sq mi (2,220 km^{2})	State map highlighting Wake County
Warren County	185	Warrenton	February 12, 1779	Bute County	Joseph Warren (1741–1775), a Patriot and volunteer private who was mortally wounded at the Battle of Bunker Hill	18,898	444 sq mi (1,150 km^{2})	State map highlighting Warren County
Washington County	187	Plymouth	December 23, 1799	Tyrrell County	George Washington (1732–1799), the 1st president of the United States	10,638	422 sq mi (1,093 km^{2})	State map highlighting Washington County
Watauga County	189	Boone	January 27, 1849	Ashe County, Caldwell County, Wilkes County, and Yancey County	The Watauga River, which came from an Indian word meaning "beautiful water"	54,786	313 sq mi (811 km^{2})	State map highlighting Watauga County
Wayne County	191	Goldsboro	November 10, 1779	Dobbs County	Anthony Wayne (1745–1796), a general in the American Revolutionary War	122,278	558 sq mi (1,445 km^{2})	State map highlighting Wayne County
Wilkes County	193	Wilkesboro	February 15, 1778	Surry County	John Wilkes (1725–1797), an English radical, journalist, and politician	66,233	756 sq mi (1,958 km^{2})	State map highlighting Wilkes County
Wilson County	195	Wilson	February 13, 1855	Edgecombe County, Johnston County, Nash County, and Wayne County	Louis D. Wilson (1789–1847), a state legislator from Edgecombe County who died of fever at Veracruz during the Mexican–American War	81,150	373 sq mi (966 km^{2})	State map highlighting Wilson County
Yadkin County	197	Yadkinville	May 1, 1851	Surry County	The Yadkin River	38,325	338 sq mi (875 km^{2})	State map highlighting Yadkin County
Yancey County	199	Burnsville	January 13, 1834	Buncombe County and Burke County	Bartlett Yancey (1785–1828), a United States Congressman, Speaker of the North Carolina Senate, and early advocate for the North Carolina Public School System	19,084	313 sq mi (811 km^{2})	State map highlighting Yancey County

== Racial / Ethnic Profile of counties in North Carolina (2020 Census) ==
Racial / Ethnic Profile of counties in North Carolina (2020 Census)
Following is a table of counties in Georgia by race/ethnicity. The majority racial/ethnic group is coded per the key below.

Majority minority with no dominant group
Majority White
Majority Black
Majority Hispanic
Majority Asian

Racial and ethnic composition of counties in North Carolina (2020 Census) (NH = Non-Hispanic) Note: the US Census treats Hispanic/Latino as an ethnic category. This table excludes Latinos from the racial categories and assigns them to a separate category. Hispanics/Latinos may be of any race.
County	Location of County	Total Population	White alone (NH)	%	Black or African American alone (NH)	%	Native American or Alaska Native alone (NH)	%	Asian alone (NH)	%	Pacific Islander alone (NH)	%	Other race alone (NH)	%	Mixed race or Multiracial (NH)	%	Hispanic or Latino (any race)	%
Alamance		171,415	102,487	59.79%	33,555	19.58%	584	0.34%	2,811	1.64%	86	0.05%	762	0.44%	6,427	3.75%	24,703	14.41%
Alexander		36,444	30,893	84.77%	1,919	5.27%	111	0.30%	390	1.07%	1	0.00%	83	0.23%	1,211	3.32%	1,836	5.04%
Alleghany		10,888	9,186	84.37%	103	0.95%	35	0.32%	15	0.14%	6	0.06%	4	0.04%	251	2.31%	1,288	11.83%
Anson		22,055	10,593	48.03%	9,838	44.61%	89	0.40%	221	1.00%	4	0.02%	38	0.17%	607	2.75%	665	3.02%
Ashe		26,577	24,028	90.41%	125	0.47%	48	0.18%	102	0.38%	12	0.05%	43	0.16%	700	2.63%	1,519	5.72%
Avery		17,806	15,549	87.32%	649	3.64%	58	0.33%	56	0.31%	1	0.01%	44	0.25%	462	2.59%	987	5.54%
Beaufort		44,652	29,431	65.91%	10,195	22.83%	90	0.20%	164	0.37%	16	0.04%	122	0.27%	1,201	2.69%	3,433	7.69%
Bertie		17,934	6,298	35.12%	10,674	59.52%	57	0.32%	63	0.35%	0	0.00%	49	0.27%	463	2.58%	330	1.84%
Bladen		29,606	15,830	53.47%	9,505	32.11%	701	2.37%	47	0.16%	8	0.03%	67	0.23%	902	3.05%	2,546	8.60%
Brunswick		136,693	110,716	81.00%	11,392	8.33%	743	0.54%	890	0.65%	75	0.05%	366	0.27%	5,091	3.72%	7,420	5.43%
Buncombe		269,452	214,862	79.74%	15,017	5.57%	727	0.27%	3,274	1.22%	467	0.17%	1,382	0.51%	11,801	4.38%	21,922	8.14%
Burke		87,570	68,664	78.41%	4,762	5.44%	238	0.27%	3,150	3.60%	64	0.07%	240	0.27%	3,268	3.73%	7,184	8.20%
Cabarrus		225,804	133,781	59.25%	41,687	18.46%	598	0.26%	11,933	5.29%	122	0.05%	1,108	0.49%	9,312	4.12%	27,263	12.07%
Caldwell		80,652	67,868	84.15%	3,843	4.76%	196	0.24%	527	0.65%	15	0.02%	238	0.30%	3,042	3.77%	4,923	6.10%
Camden		10,355	8,200	79.19%	1,049	10.13%	40	0.39%	118	1.14%	1	0.01%	53	0.51%	554	5.35%	340	3.28%
Carteret		67,686	57,538	85.01%	3,208	4.74%	252	0.37%	584	0.86%	63	0.09%	252	0.37%	2,670	3.94%	3,119	4.61%
Caswell		22,736	14,036	61.74%	6,804	29.93%	65	0.29%	61	0.27%	13	0.06%	57	0.25%	698	3.07%	1,002	4.41%
Catawba		160,610	116,120	72.30%	12,628	7.86%	379	0.24%	6,937	4.32%	78	0.05%	539	0.34%	6,552	4.08%	17,377	10.82%
Chatham		76,285	53,087	69.59%	7,768	10.18%	173	0.23%	1,616	2.12%	24	0.03%	308	0.40%	2,937	3.85%	10,372	13.60%
Cherokee		28,774	25,366	88.16%	373	1.30%	417	1.45%	158	0.55%	0	0.00%	66	0.23%	1,495	5.20%	899	3.12%
Chowan		13,708	8,268	60.32%	4,376	31.92%	43	0.31%	39	0.28%	1	0.01%	18	0.13%	433	3.16%	530	3.87%
Clay		11,089	10,044	90.58%	60	0.54%	44	0.40%	40	0.36%	7	0.06%	23	0.21%	433	3.91%	438	3.95%
Cleveland		99,519	70,163	70.50%	20,034	20.13%	222	0.22%	854	0.86%	23	0.02%	327	0.33%	3,857	3.88%	4,039	4.06%
Columbus		50,623	30,019	59.30%	14,503	28.65%	1,670	3.30%	156	0.31%	10	0.02%	143	0.28%	1,509	2.98%	2,613	5.16%
Craven		100,720	64,933	64.47%	19,903	19.76%	318	0.32%	3,059	3.04%	150	0.15%	446	0.44%	4,716	4.68%	7,195	7.14%
Cumberland		334,728	133,201	39.79%	124,173	37.10%	4,647	1.39%	8,943	2.67%	1,357	0.41%	2,206	0.66%	20,703	6.19%	39,498	11.80%
Currituck		28,100	23,505	83.65%	1,377	4.90%	98	0.35%	265	0.94%	22	0.08%	109	0.39%	1,506	5.36%	1,218	4.33%
Dare		36,915	31,921	86.47%	678	1.84%	99	0.27%	260	0.70%	10	0.03%	140	0.38%	1,253	3.39%	2,554	6.92%
Davidson		168,930	129,487	76.65%	15,839	9.38%	665	0.39%	2,440	1.44%	43	0.03%	491	0.29%	6,063	3.59%	13,902	8.23%
Davie		42,712	34,809	81.50%	2,413	5.65%	96	0.22%	277	0.65%	5	0.01%	124	0.29%	1,613	3.78%	3,375	7.90%
Duplin		48,715	24,945	51.21%	11,437	23.48%	154	0.32%	155	0.32%	4	0.01%	120	0.25%	1,087	2.23%	10,813	22.20%
Durham		324,833	133,768	41.18%	109,225	33.62%	704	0.22%	16,707	5.14%	83	0.03%	1,809	0.56%	12,433	3.83%	50,104	15.42%
Edgecombe		48,900	17,340	35.46%	27,299	55.83%	128	0.26%	112	0.23%	9	0.02%	138	0.28%	1,168	2.39%	2,706	5.53%
Forsyth		382,590	208,126	54.40%	93,738	24.50%	978	0.26%	9,179	2.40%	233	0.06%	1,623	0.42%	14,025	3.67%	54,688	14.29%
Franklin		68,573	42,285	61.66%	15,785	23.02%	259	0.38%	452	0.66%	17	0.02%	277	0.40%	2,536	3.70%	6,962	10.15%
Gaston		227,943	153,653	67.41%	39,762	17.44%	753	0.33%	3,509	1.54%	59	0.03%	844	0.37%	9,295	4.08%	20,068	8.80%
Gates		10,478	6,705	63.99%	3,022	28.84%	64	0.61%	21	0.20%	10	0.10%	29	0.28%	426	4.07%	201	1.92%
Graham		8,030	6,885	85.74%	46	0.57%	570	7.10%	20	0.25%	4	0.05%	4	0.05%	282	3.51%	219	2.73%
Granville		60,992	33,610	55.11%	18,315	30.03%	205	0.34%	366	0.60%	24	0.04%	207	0.34%	2,054	3.37%	6,211	10.18%
Greene		20,451	9,644	47.16%	7,206	35.24%	95	0.46%	37	0.18%	0	0.00%	78	0.38%	455	2.22%	2,936	14.36%
Guilford		541,299	255,640	47.23%	179,423	33.15%	1,918	0.35%	28,719	5.31%	216	0.04%	2,850	0.53%	20,381	3.77%	52,152	9.63%
Halifax		48,622	19,070	39.22%	24,737	50.88%	1,593	3.28%	281	0.58%	11	0.02%	142	0.29%	1,334	2.74%	1,454	2.99%
Harnett		133,568	77,876	58.30%	26,769	20.04%	978	0.73%	1,408	1.05%	242	0.18%	707	0.53%	6,689	5.01%	18,899	14.15%
Haywood		62,089	55,685	89.69%	656	1.06%	308	0.50%	360	0.58%	1	0.00%	156	0.25%	2,094	3.37%	2,829	4.56%
Henderson		116,281	91,747	78.90%	3,299	2.84%	284	0.24%	1,296	1.11%	241	0.21%	400	0.34%	4,015	3.45%	14,999	12.90%
Hertford		21,552	6,721	31.19%	12,215	56.68%	188	0.87%	113	0.52%	3	0.01%	99	0.46%	634	2.94%	1,579	7.33%
Hoke		52,082	19,667	37.76%	16,385	31.46%	3,803	7.30%	716	1.37%	189	0.36%	336	0.65%	3,299	6.33%	7,687	14.76%
Hyde		4,589	2,928	63.80%	1,152	25.10%	7	0.15%	7	0.15%	2	0.04%	15	0.33%	131	2.85%	347	7.56%
Iredell		186,693	136,393	73.06%	21,255	11.39%	437	0.23%	4,718	2.53%	58	0.03%	656	0.35%	7,399	3.96%	15,777	8.45%
Jackson		43,109	32,800	76.09%	736	1.71%	3,849	8.93%	497	1.15%	10	0.02%	105	0.24%	1,820	4.22%	3,292	7.64%
Johnston		215,999	136,464	63.18%	33,041	15.30%	880	0.41%	1,831	0.85%	71	0.03%	913	0.42%	8,399	3.89%	34,400	15.93%
Jones		9,172	5,787	63.09%	2,564	27.95%	42	0.46%	32	0.35%	0	0.00%	35	0.38%	318	3.47%	394	4.30%
Lee		63,285	36,055	56.97%	10,701	16.91%	231	0.36%	643	1.02%	43	0.07%	227	0.36%	2,263	3.58%	13,122	20.73%
Lenoir		55,122	26,582	48.22%	22,034	39.97%	134	0.24%	332	0.60%	22	0.04%	135	0.24%	1,518	2.75%	4,365	7.92%
Lincoln		86,810	71,661	82.55%	4,405	5.07%	237	0.27%	692	0.80%	15	0.02%	208	0.24%	3,180	3.66%	6,412	7.39%
McDowell		44,578	37,788	84.77%	1,707	3.83%	136	0.31%	388	0.87%	0	0.00%	129	0.29%	1,483	3.33%	2,947	6.61%
Macon		37,014	31,535	85.20%	252	0.68%	167	0.45%	250	0.68%	6	0.02%	103	0.28%	1,203	3.25%	3,498	9.45%
Madison		21,193	19,233	90.75%	197	0.93%	56	0.26%	84	0.40%	1	0.00%	73	0.34%	801	3.78%	748	3.53%
Martin		22,031	11,528	52.33%	8,868	40.25%	69	0.31%	98	0.44%	1	0.00%	64	0.29%	508	2.31%	895	4.06%
Mecklenburg		1,115,482	498,683	44.71%	324,832	29.12%	2,730	0.24%	71,583	6.42%	531	0.05%	6,889	0.62%	40,312	3.61%	169,922	15.23%
Mitchell		14,903	13,514	90.68%	50	0.34%	30	0.20%	52	0.35%	1	0.01%	30	0.20%	525	3.52%	701	4.70%
Montgomery		25,751	16,504	64.09%	4,192	16.28%	76	0.30%	391	1.52%	2	0.01%	47	0.18%	615	2.39%	3,924	15.24%
Moore		99,727	75,391	75.60%	10,545	10.57%	688	0.69%	1,237	1.24%	59	0.06%	351	0.35%	4,091	4.10%	7,365	7.39%
Nash		94,970	46,317	48.77%	36,679	38.62%	615	0.65%	904	0.95%	28	0.03%	407	0.43%	2,698	2.84%	7,322	7.71%
New Hanover		225,702	167,150	74.06%	26,974	11.95%	678	0.30%	3,468	1.54%	148	0.07%	992	0.44%	8,992	3.98%	17,300	7.66%
Northampton		17,471	6,835	39.12%	9,649	55.23%	43	0.25%	27	0.15%	4	0.02%	76	0.43%	484	2.77%	353	2.02%
Onslow		204,576	129,499	63.30%	26,939	13.17%	1,019	0.50%	4,508	2.20%	777	0.38%	1,148	0.56%	13,045	6.38%	27,641	13.51%
Orange		148,696	96,537	64.92%	15,571	10.47%	334	0.22%	12,615	8.48%	43	0.03%	798	0.54%	6,986	4.70%	15,812	10.63%
Pamlico		12,276	9,104	74.16%	2,055	16.74%	58	0.47%	50	0.41%	5	0.04%	51	0.42%	457	3.72%	496	4.04%
Pasquotank		40,568	21,577	53.19%	14,316	35.29%	150	0.37%	458	1.13%	28	0.07%	178	0.44%	1,624	4.00%	2,237	5.51%
Pender		60,203	44,418	73.78%	7,544	12.53%	195	0.32%	319	0.53%	23	0.04%	243	0.40%	2,479	4.12%	4,982	8.27%
Perquimans		13,005	9,333	71.76%	2,686	20.65%	35	0.27%	36	0.28%	7	0.05%	41	0.32%	558	4.29%	309	2.38%
Person		39,097	25,132	64.28%	9,879	25.27%	240	0.61%	124	0.32%	8	0.02%	121	0.31%	1,398	3.58%	2,195	5.61%
Pitt		170,243	86,837	51.01%	59,813	35.13%	494	0.29%	3,056	1.79%	94	0.06%	752	0.44%	6,229	3.66%	12,968	7.62%
Polk		19,328	16,716	86.49%	689	3.56%	51	0.26%	60	0.31%	7	0.04%	41	0.21%	738	3.82%	1,026	5.31%
Randolph		144,171	108,354	75.16%	8,592	5.96%	666	0.46%	2,158	1.50%	10	0.01%	412	0.29%	4,928	3.42%	19,051	13.21%
Richmond		42,946	23,610	54.98%	12,770	29.73%	994	2.31%	360	0.84%	7	0.02%	167	0.39%	1,966	4.58%	3,072	7.15%
Robeson		116,530	29,159	25.02%	26,218	22.50%	43,536	37.36%	897	0.77%	63	0.05%	411	0.35%	4,489	3.85%	11,757	10.09%
Rockingham		91,096	64,218	70.49%	16,611	18.23%	282	0.31%	493	0.54%	29	0.03%	287	0.32%	3,090	3.39%	6,086	6.68%
Rowan		146,875	100,135	68.18%	22,730	15.48%	444	0.30%	1,505	1.02%	71	0.05%	535	0.36%	5,515	3.75%	15,940	10.85%
Rutherford		64,444	52,026	80.73%	5,836	9.06%	152	0.24%	343	0.53%	23	0.04%	210	0.33%	2,568	3.98%	3,286	5.10%
Sampson		59,036	29,729	50.36%	13,944	23.62%	1,002	1.70%	216	0.37%	18	0.03%	156	0.26%	1,722	2.92%	12,249	20.75%
Scotland		34,174	14,247	41.69%	13,094	38.32%	3,705	10.84%	339	0.99%	15	0.04%	112	0.33%	1,556	4.55%	1,106	3.24%
Stanly		62,504	48,645	77.83%	7,000	11.20%	210	0.34%	1,140	1.82%	9	0.01%	131	0.21%	2,283	3.65%	3,086	4.94%
Stokes		44,520	39,609	88.97%	1,619	3.64%	140	0.31%	158	0.35%	11	0.02%	77	0.17%	1,450	3.26%	1,456	3.27%
Surry		71,359	57,771	80.96%	2,413	3.38%	130	0.18%	370	0.52%	11	0.02%	148	0.21%	2,020	2.83%	8,496	11.91%
Swain		14,117	8,541	60.50%	102	0.72%	4,030	28.55%	53	0.38%	10	0.07%	44	0.31%	745	5.28%	592	4.19%
Transylvania		32,986	28,542	86.53%	1,027	3.11%	102	0.31%	173	0.52%	22	0.07%	115	0.35%	1,307	3.96%	1,698	5.15%
Tyrrell		3,245	1,879	57.90%	934	28.78%	5	0.15%	43	1.33%	0	0.00%	13	0.40%	99	3.05%	272	8.38%
Union		238,267	161,113	67.62%	26,500	11.12%	641	0.27%	9,516	3.99%	90	0.04%	1,199	0.50%	9,098	3.82%	30,110	12.64%
Vance		42,578	16,243	38.15%	21,081	49.51%	91	0.21%	284	0.67%	9	0.02%	110	0.26%	1,043	2.45%	3,717	8.73%
Wake		1,129,410	645,020	57.11%	204,535	18.11%	2,760	0.24%	96,665	8.56%	453	0.04%	6,210	0.55%	45,526	4.03%	128,241	11.35%
Warren		18,642	7,209	38.67%	9,049	48.54%	953	5.11%	62	0.33%	4	0.02%	65	0.35%	561	3.01%	739	3.96%
Washington		11,003	4,958	45.06%	5,350	48.62%	15	0.14%	37	0.34%	3	0.03%	36	0.33%	233	2.12%	371	3.37%
Watauga		54,086	44,986	83.18%	2,101	3.88%	82	0.15%	938	1.73%	11	0.02%	438	0.81%	2,009	3.71%	3,521	6.51%
Wayne		117,333	60,199	51.31%	35,329	30.11%	335	0.29%	1,542	1.31%	71	0.06%	454	0.39%	4,476	3.81%	14,927	12.72%
Wilkes		65,969	56,316	85.37%	2,580	3.91%	86	0.13%	324	0.49%	5	0.01%	131	0.20%	1,873	2.84%	4,654	7.05%
Wilson		78,784	36,106	45.83%	29,842	37.88%	239	0.30%	900	1.14%	10	0.01%	257	0.33%	2,406	3.05%	9,024	11.45%
Yadkin		37,214	30,357	81.57%	1,071	2.88%	63	0.17%	142	0.38%	0	0.00%	87	0.23%	1,112	2.99%	4,382	11.78%
Yancey		18,470	16,625	90.01%	104	0.56%	57	0.31%	40	0.22%	1	0.01%	40	0.22%	587	3.18%	1,016	5.50%

== Historic counties ==
County	Created	Abolished	Fate
Albemarle County	1664	1738	Partitioned into Bertie County, Chowan County, Currituck County, Pasquotank County, Perquimans County, and Tyrrell County
Bath County	1696	1738	Partitioned into Beaufort County, Bladen County, Carteret County, Craven County, Hyde County, New Hanover County, and Onslow County
Bute County	1764	1779	Created from the eastern part of Granville County. Partitioned into Franklin County and Warren County
Clarendon County	1664	1667	Damaged by a hurricane in August 1667 and subsequently abandoned & abolished
Dobbs County	1758	1791	Partitioned into Greene County and Lenoir County
Tryon County	1768	1779	Partitioned into Lincoln County and Rutherford County

For several months in 1784, Cumberland County was known as Fayette County and sent representatives to the North Carolina General Assembly of April 1784 under this name.

=== Proposed counties ===
In the state's history, two counties have officially been proposed, but not created—Hooper County and Lillington County, in 1851 and 1859, respectively. The former was to be created from parts of Richmond and Robeson Counties, and the latter was to be created from parts of New Hanover County. Hooper County was to be named for William Hooper, a Founding Father from North Carolina, and Lillington County was to be named for Alexander Lillington, a Revolutionary War hero who had been buried in the designated area. Both of the proposals failed in their respective referendums. Later on, Scotland County would be created in the area where Hooper County was proposed, and Pender County would fill the area where Lillington County was proposed.

== See also ==
- List of municipalities in North Carolina
- List of census-designated places in North Carolina
- List of ghost towns in North Carolina
- List of former United States counties

== Works cited ==
- Corbitt, David Leroy. The Formation of the North Carolina Counties, 1663–1943. Raleigh: State Dept. of Archives and History, 1950. Reprint, Raleigh: Division of Archives and History, North Carolina Dept. of Cultural Resources, 1987. ISBN 0-86526-032-X
- Powell, William S. The North Carolina Gazetteer. Chapel Hill: University of North Carolina Press, 1968. Reprint, 1985. ISBN 0-8078-1247-1
