= Governor Harvey =

Governor Harvey may refer to:

- James M. Harvey (politician) (1833–1894), 5th Governor of Kansas
- John Harvey (Albemarle) (died 1679), Governor of Albemarle Sound in 1679
- John Harvey (British Army officer) (1778–1852), Governor of Newfoundland from 1841 to 1846
- John Harvey (Virginia governor) (died 1646), Crown Governor of Virginia from 1628 to 1635 and from 1637 to 1639
- Louis P. Harvey (1820–1862), 7th Governor of Wisconsin
- Matthew Harvey (1781–1866), 13th Governor of New Hampshire
- Wilson Godfrey Harvey (1866–1932), 94th Governor of South Carolina
