= Culpeper's Rebellion =

1677 popular uprising in the province of Carolina

Culpeper’s Rebellion
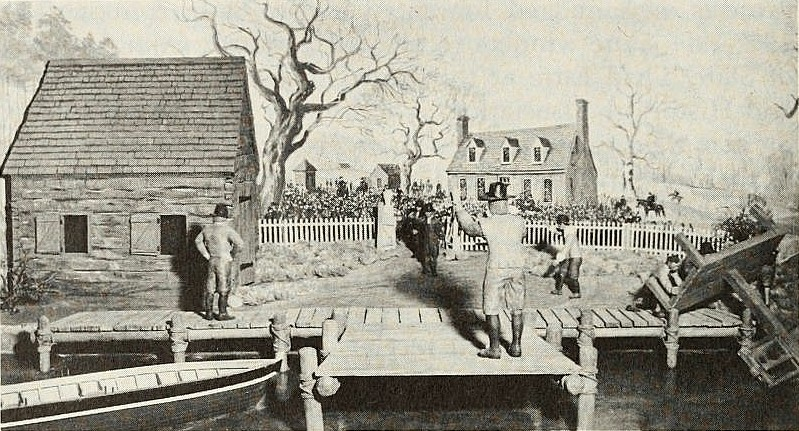
- Citizens protesting taxing of tobacco
- Date: December 1677
- Location: Albemarle Colony
- Goals: Overthrow of local government in repudiation of the Naval Acts
- Methods: Military coup

Parties
Lords Proprietors of South Carolina	Rebel NC Militia

Lead figures
Thomas Eastchurch; Thomas Miller	John Culpeper; George Durant

Culpeper's Rebellion was a popular uprising in 1677 provoked by the enforcement of the Navigation Acts. It was led by settler John Culpeper against the ruling Lords Proprietor in Albemarle County, Carolina, near what is now Elizabeth City, North Carolina. The uprising met with only limited success, but Culpeper himself was acquitted of rebellion and became a hero, and the Lords Proprietor subsequently made efforts to strengthen the colony's government.

== Background ==
In 1629, King Charles I granted control of the Province of Carolana to Robert Heath, establishing Heath as the first lord proprietor of the province. Partly due to the large area of the province, and partly to neglect on Heath's part, the territory remained underdeveloped in the decades following Heath's appointment.

Swamps and rivers made travel by land difficult, and the inlets and sounds were too shallow to allow big ships. The people who already lived there in the 1660s had no desire to be governed by the Lords Proprietor. Partly as a result of these conditions and partly from a lack of interest, the lords appointed governors who were weak and ineffective. Some of them took advantage of the general chaos to make themselves wealthy.

In that environment, some kind of conflict between the settlers and the colonial authorities was almost inevitable. The conflict that broke out would be known as Culpeper's Rebellion, and like a lot of rebellions, it started with a dispute over taxes.

The English government wanted its American colonies to generate some income — that was, after all, the main point of establishing those colonies. The economic theory of the time, called mercantilism, was that a country should export as much as possible and import as little as possible, and therefore store up as much money (gold and silver) as possible. Under that principle, the colonies should export only raw materials to England, while the English should turn those raw materials into more expensive finished goods which it, in turn, could export to other countries or back to its colonies. For example, the American colonies were expected to export wood but not furniture, naval stores but not ships, and crops such as tobacco and rice but not the tools needed to produce them. Producing the manufactured goods was England's job. And at every step of this trade, taxes should be collected.

To put these ideas into practice, Parliament passed a series of laws called Navigation Acts that controlled trade within the English colonial empire. Under the acts, colonial goods could be carried only on English and colonial ships, and all European goods bound for English colonies had to go through England first. Of course, whenever colonial goods passed through English ports, they were taxed. In addition, certain colonial goods such as tobacco, rice, and sugar could be shipped only to England — not even to other English colonies unless they paid a tax first.

To encourage settlement, the Charter of Carolina had exempted Carolinians from paying export duties, or taxes, on goods such as tobacco — but only for seven years, and in 1670, that exemption expired, and the Navigation Acts went into full force. The residents of Albemarle were unhappy with the Navigation Acts. They relied on tobacco for their income, and since Albemarle did not have a good port, they sold much of their tobacco to traders from New England, whose small ships could get through narrow inlets. They considered the tax an unfair hardship. Worse, the taxes came on top of several years of bad harvests caused by major hurricanes, drought, and wild rains. Settlers also grumbled about the quitrents they had to pay on their land, which were higher than in neighboring colonies.

In 1672, the Assembly of Albemarle sent the governor, Peter Carteret, to England to ask the Lords Proprietor not to collect the taxes required by the Navigation Acts. But they refused — in part because they feared that if they did not enforce the laws, their charter might be revoked.

A new governor, John Jenkins, appointed Valentine Bird as the collector for the colony's customs duties, or export taxes, but Jenkins never really intended to enforce the laws. Two men who supported the lords, Thomas Eastchurch and Thomas Miller, complained. Miller was thrown in jail for treason, but he escaped and went to England with Eastchurch to tell the lords what was happening in Albemarle. They then appointed Eastchurch as governor and Miller as customs collector.

Thomas Miller took the job of customs collector seriously. He not only collected the taxes, but also seized illegally imported goods and imposed fines. When Eastchurch was delayed in England, Miller also had himself appointed interim governor, and he used that power to interfere with elections and to imprison his opponents, including George Durant, a prominent settler who had lived in Albemarle since before 1663. For protection — or just to enhance his image — Miller traveled with a guard of armed men.

== Development of the revolt ==
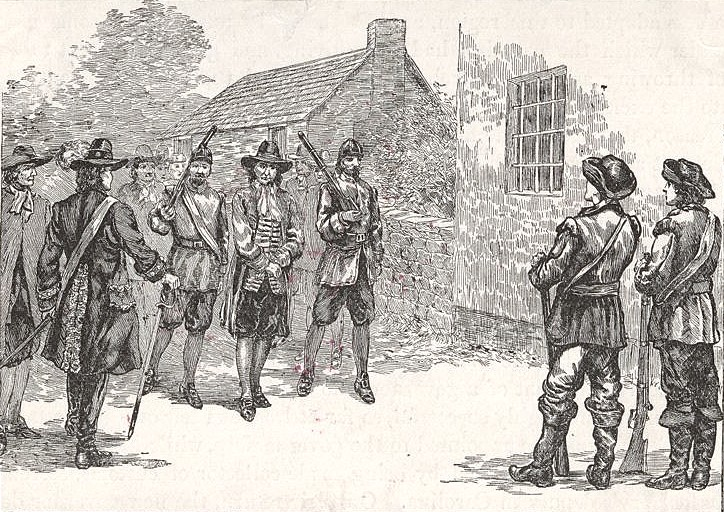
Thomas Miller imprisoned during Culpeper's Rebellion

In 1677, a group of about 40 men opposed to the lords decided to force Miller out of office. They were led by Durant, Valentine Bird, and John Culpeper, who had been thrown out of Charles Town and who, according to one historian, “had the reputation of a troublemaker who enjoyed a good fight.” They armed themselves, arrested Miller and other officials, and took over the government.

The rebels then held new elections for an assembly that met at Durant's house, composed of locals including James Blount. Acting as the colony's government, they tried Miller, convicted him, and imprisoned him, and they warned Thomas Eastchurch, who had recently arrived in Virginia, to stay away.

Miller again escaped from jail and went to England to report to the lords. Culpeper followed him to make his own case. The English government held an investigation, and Culpeper was tried for rebellion. The Lords Proprietor, though, wanted to keep the matter quiet. Lord Shaftesbury, one of the lords, defended him, arguing that the colony had no settled government and that the settler had every right to “riot” against the abuses of Miller and Eastchurch. Culpeper was acquitted and returned home to Albemarle a hero. John Culpeper had been born in 1644 in Barbados, and died in 1694 in Pasquotank Precinct, province of Carolina. His siblings had many offspring who inhabited the area. His third-grandnephew John Culpepper (1761–1841) became a Congressional Representative in the region.

== After Culpeper's Rebellion ==
After Culpeper's Rebellion, the lords made a more serious effort to get control of the colony. They appointed a new governor, Seth Sothel, who was himself a lord — he had bought Edward Hyde’s share of the colony, but on his way to America, Sothel was captured by Turkish pirates. In his absence, George Durant governed the colony, even though he did not have the title of governor. Durant restored order, pardoned the rebels, and collected the customs duties.

When Sothel finally arrived in North Carolina in 1683, he turned out to be so corrupt that the assembly removed him from office and banished him from the colony. After further chaos and rebellion, Philip Ludwell became governor of all of Carolina in 1691. The lords ordered him to simplify the government, ignoring the Fundamental Constitutions in favor of the original charter. Ludwell appointed long-time residents of the Albemarle to govern that region as his deputies. Finally, with peace and stability, the colony of North Carolina could begin to grow. A larger uprising would soon take place known as Cary's Rebellion.

== Works cited ==
- Rankin, Hugh F. (1962). Upheaval in Albemarle: The Story of Culpeper's Rebellion, 1675-1689. Raleigh, N.C.: Carolina Charter Tercentenary Commission.
