= Seth Sothel =

Governor of Albemarle County, Carolina from 1682 to 1689

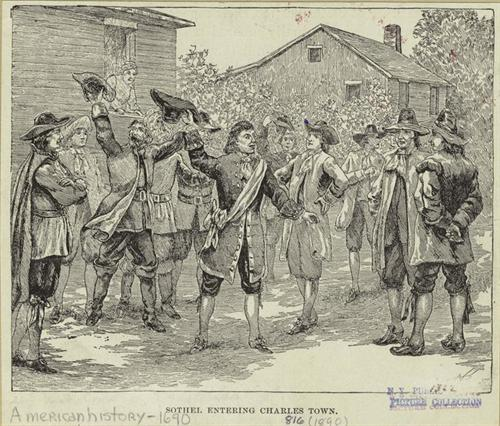

Acting Governor of Albemarle County, Carolina
- In office 1678 – February 1679
- Preceded by: Thomas Miller
- Succeeded by: John Harvey

12th Governor of Albemarle County, Carolina
- In office 1682–1689
- Preceded by: John Jenkins
- Succeeded by: John Gibbs

9th Governor of South Carolina
- In office 1690–1692
- Preceded by: James Colleton
- Succeeded by: Philip Ludwell

Personal details
- Died: c. 1694 Albemarle County, Carolina

Seth Sothel (also spelled Sothell and Southwell, died c. 1694) was the 12th Governor of Albemarle County, Carolina from to and from 1682 to 1689.

== Biography ==
Sothel fraudulently claimed to have purchased a propriety from Edward Hyde, 1st Earl of Clarendon, a title given to him by King Charles II, who was his grandson. Hyde, along with 7 others helped King Charles II regain his throne after his exile in France. These 8 were given the Carolina Charter in 1663 for their loyalty, which comprised all of what now is North & South Carolina. Hyde’s piece was all lands from Virginia to the Cape Fear River (originally the Clarendon River).

The Lord Proprietors acted as a legal body for management of the Carolina Charter, which included strict provisions for a governor. Sothel met no such requirements and was famous for his illegal claims and was recalled to England by the Lord Proprietors multiple times to answer to charges of treachery. The Earl of Clarendon never made Sothel governor, and any claim Sothel made for any deed is false, with no record of his fraudulent claims.

After leaving England, he was captured by Algerian corsairs. During the time he waited to be released, Albemarle was governed by John Harvey.

During his administration, he committed many crimes. Sothel prohibited trade between the settlers and Amerindians, but he kept the benefits. He imprisoned people who opposed him (including Thomas Pollock and George Durant) and kept their lands. He confiscated "merchant ships and their cargoes", stole slaves, cattle, and farmlands, and accepted bribes from criminals in exchange for releasing them without prosecution.

However, in 1689, after he established the Salmon Creek plantation, the residents of the colony revolted against him and captured him. They sent Sothel back to England for trial where he was punished by banning him from any office in North Carolina. He was expelled from the government of the colony on December 2, 1689, and exiled for a year.

Sothel then fled to South Carolina. He announced himself as governor in 1690, but was suspended on November 8, 1691. Sothel then returned to Albemarle, to Salmon Creek, where he died shortly afterwards, in about 1694 as a squatter.

== Personal life ==
Sothel married Anna Willix. They had no children.
