= John Culpeper (rebel) =

Leader of Culpeper's Rebellion

Member of the Rebel North Carolina Assembly
- In office 1677–1678

Member of the South Carolina Parliament
- In office 1672–1673

Surveyor General of South Carolina
- In office 1671–1673

Personal details
- Born: 1644 Barbados, British Caribbean
- Died: 1694 (aged 49–50) Pasquotank Precinct, Province of North Carolina
- Spouse(s): Sarah Mayo; Judith Culpeper; Margaret Culpeper
- Children: 1
- Parent: John Culpepper III
- Occupation: planter class, colonial official, rebel leader
- Known for: Leader of Culpeper's Rebellion (1677)
- Nickname(s): The Carolina Rebel; John of Albemarle

John Culpeper IV (1644–1694) was a Barbadian politician, surveyor, and rebel leader in Colonial America, during the seventeenth century, best known for his role in what came to be called Culpeper's Rebellion (1677), an armed uprising in the Albemarle region of the Province of Carolina against proprietary rule and the enforcement of the Navigation Acts. His rebellion was one of the only instances of large scale anti-British Crown rebellions in the early colonial period, next to Bacon's Rebellion.

== Early life and family ==
John Culpeper IV was born in 1644 to John 'The Merchant' Culpepper III, in Barbados. He was born there before his father moved to New Haven, Connecticut, dying there around 1675. His grandfather Sir John Culpeper II was Sheriff of Worcestershire. The first certain record of Culpeper IV in North America, dates to 15 July 1670, when he appeared in an Albemarle court as the attorney for Governor William Berkeley. In 1688 he married Sarah Mayo, with whom he had one daughter, named Sarah Culpepper.

== Life in South Carolina ==
Shortly after arriving in North America around 1670 he moved to South Carolina, being involved as Surveyor General for the state as well as a member of the South Carolina Parliament, both in the early 1670s. In 1672 he was granted a lot in Charleston and a 370-acre plantation. Around June 1673, Culpeper abruptly departed the colony without prior permission, in violation of a local law that forbade leaving without three weeks' notice to the governor and council. Some later accounts suggested he fled to avoid execution or punishment, but there is no substantial evidence supporting such claims. At the time, South Carolina was experiencing food shortages and political uncertainty connected to proposed divisions of proprietary territory that would have reshaped governance in the region. Whatever his reasons, Culpeper was back in the Albemarle region of North Carolina by November 1673.

== Leading Culpeper's Rebellion ==
Upon his return to Albemarle, Culpeper became active in a local political faction led by John Jenkins, a longtime settler and acting governor who opposed the influence of more recently arrived colonists led by Thomas Eastchurch, speaker of the assembly. The rivalry between the two groups fueled ongoing tensions in the colony’s governance. Colonists opposed to Miller's rule seized weapons, arrested Miller and several members of his council, and convened their own assembly and council. The new assembly turned over Miller to a special court that tried him for various abuses of power. Culpeper was one of these key leaders (the rebellion was named after him years later) who helped organize the meetings, sessions, and purpose of the rebellion. Miller escaped prison and sailed to England to inform the Lords proprietors of what had taken place. Culpeper followed him and was tried for treason.

== Trial in England ==
Thomas Miller accused John Culpeper of seizing royal customs without authority and inciting rebellion against the King of England and the Lords proprietors. Facing execution, Culpeper was arrested and brought to trial. Lord Shaftesbury testified in Culpeper's favor, arguing that Miller's lack of lawful authority undermined the basis for a treason charge. The court ordered a single customs duty paid, and Culpeper was acquitted, and the charges were dismissed.

== Later life ==
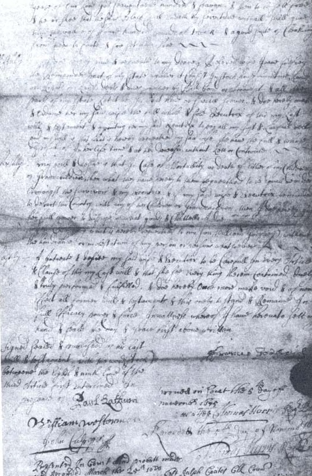
Document with John Culpeper signature in the bottom left

After his trial, Culpeper returned to Albemarle a hero. He had two wives at an earlier point, but no children were recorded. He married Sarah Mayo, several years after his return, fathering a single child with her, named Sarah Culpepper. He died in Albemarle County, North Carolina, aged 49 or 50.
