= Thomas Miller (North Carolina governor) =

Acting Governor of Albemarle County, Carolina from July to December 1677

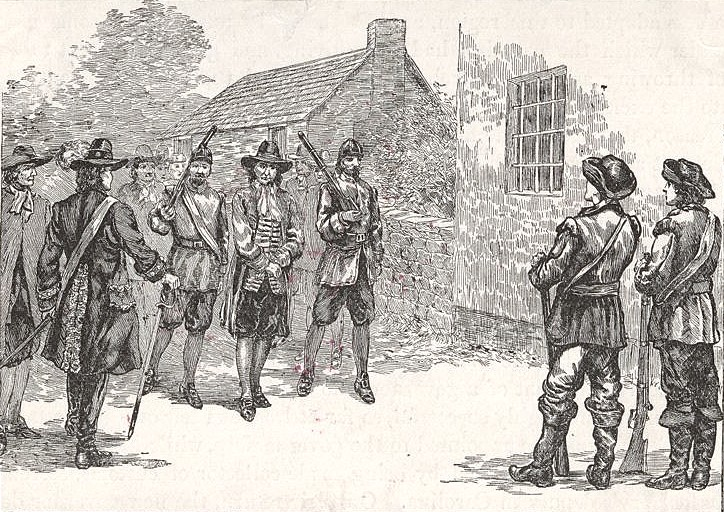
- Miller imprisoned during Culpeper's Rebellion

Acting Governor of Albemarle County, Carolina
- In office July 1677 – December 1677
- Preceded by: John Jenkins
- Succeeded by: John Harvey

Personal details
- Died: October 1685

Thomas Miller (died October 1685) was the acting governor of Albemarle County, Carolina from July to December 1677. He is best known for his role in Culpeper's Rebellion.

== Early life ==
Miller, originally a merchant and apothecary in Ireland, emigrated to North Carolina and settled in Albemarle County in 1673, where he secured leadership of the proprietary political faction. Miller was later jailed for blasphemy, treason, and loathing towards the Lords Proprietors, although the Virginia Council acquitted him in May 1676. After the trial, he travelled with Thomas Eastchurch to London, England, where they convinced the Lords Proprietors that Eastchurch should govern Albemarle County. Miller was granted the titles of council member, secretary, and customs collector. In 1677, Miller and Eastchurch travelled to Albemarle.

== Governor of Albemarle County ==
Shortly after that, Eastchurch appointed Miller as the Interim Governor and President of the Executive Council of Albemarle, having obtained a commission. Miller was nominated because after leaving London and embarking again to North Carolina together with Eastchurch, they had to stop temporarily at Nevis Island in the Caribbean. Eastchurch met and married a woman on the island before eventually returning to North Carolina and spending his honeymoon there. During his absence, Miller occupied his place in the government of the county, being elected by Eastchurch because he was his fellow proprietary and travelling companion. Miller arrived in Albemarle in July 1677 and claimed the government of Albemarle county. During his role he punished the anti-proprietors for several offences which they had apparently committed. He also increased taxes and diverted public money in order to cover the salary of his armed guards. Miller jailed Zachariah Gillam for customs violations and he also tried to jail George Durant, the leader of the anti-proprietary faction, which led to the Culpeper's Rebellion against him in Albemarle.

== Culpeper's Rebellion ==
The revolt began when Thomas Miller was apprehended by his opponents and imprisoned in a log house of about 10 or 11 square feet, that had been purposely built for him.

Although Eastchurch arrived in Virginia in December 1678, he could not occupy the position of governor of Albemarle because of the developing revolution there. He demanded that the settlers should surrender their weapons, and that all prisoners should be released. Furthermore, he recommended that a delegation should be formed with the aim of teaching those who visited Virginia the origin of the popular revolt, and that Miller's government was to be restored.

Although Eastchurch's demands were rejected, he was able to stop the advancement of the trial developing against Miller. Therefore; although he remained in prison for two years until his friends broke him out, his execution was avoided. Miller travelled to London to complain to the Lords Proprietors, the Commissioners of Customs, and the Privy Council about the events that had happened. Because of this, the leaders of Culpeper's Rebellion, Zachariah Gillam and John Culpeper, were jailed after their arrival in London, although Gillam was released from jail because of the lack of evidence to prove the charges. Culpeper himself was later absolved of his treason. As compensation, the royal treasury paid Thomas Miller.

== Last life ==
In March 1681, he was appointed customs collector in Poole, England. However, in July 1682, he was fired from this position and incarcerated for embezzlement. He later died in prison sometime in October 1685.
