= Governor Stephens =

Governor Stephens may refer to:

- Alexander H. Stephens (1812–1883), 50th governor of Georgia
- Lawrence Vest Stephens (1858–1923), 29th governor of Missouri
- Samuel Stephens (North Carolina governor) (1629–1669), Governor of the Albemarle Colony (later North Carolina) from 1667 to 1669
- Stan Stephens (1929–2021), 20th governor of Montana
- William Stephens (American politician) (1859–1944), 24th Governor of California
- William Stephens (governor of Georgia) (1671–1753), Colonial Governor of Georgia from 1743 to 1751

== See also ==
- Governor Stephen (disambiguation)
