= Governor Jenkins =

Governor Jenkins may refer to:

- John Jenkins (governor) (died 1681), Governor of Albemarle (now North Carolina) four times between 1672 and 1681
- Evan Meredith Jenkins (1896–1985), Governor of the Punjab in the British Empire from 1946 to 1947
