= Governor Carteret =

Governor Carteret may refer to:

- Philip Carteret (colonial governor) (1639–1682), 1st Governor of the Colony of New Jersey from 1665 to 1673 and Governor of East New Jersey from 1674 to 1682
- Peter Carteret (1641–after 1676), Governor of the British colony of Albemarle from 1670 to 1672
