= Governor Stephen =

Governor Stephen may refer to:

- James Stephen (civil servant) (1789–1859), Acting Governor of Gibraltar from 1875 to 1876, and in 1878
- George Milner Stephen (1812–1894), Acting Governor of South Australia in 1838
- Ninian Stephen (1923–2017), 20th Governor-General of Australia from 1982 to 1989

== See also ==
- Governor Stephens (disambiguation)
