= John Jenkins (governor) =

Governor of Albemarle County, Carolina

4th, 6th, and 10th Governor of Albemarle County, Carolina
- In office 1672–1675
- Preceded by: Peter Carteret
- Succeeded by: Thomas Eastchurch
- In office 1676–1677
- Preceded by: Thomas Eastchurch
- Succeeded by: Thomas Miller
- In office 1680–1681
- Preceded by: John Harvey
- Succeeded by: Thomas Miller

Personal details
- Born: England
- Died: December 17, 1681 Albemarle County, Carolina
- Spouse(s): Ann, Johanna Gerald

John Jenkins was an English soldier who served as the fourth, sixth, and tenth governor of Albemarle County, Carolina from 1672 to 1675, from 1676 to 1677, and from 1680 to 1681.

== Biography ==
John Jenkins was born in England. Jenkins first arrived in Maryland in the 1650s. He was given the title Captain, and he likely served in Oliver Cromwell's New Model Army. His first wife, Ann, was listed as a "transport" in local records, and likely arrived in Maryland as a servant. Ann died around the time her terms of service expired. Jenkins then married Johanna Gerald, whose family was widely known in the Chesapeake for their radical, antimonarchical views and support for democratic republican government in the English colonies. John and Johanna initially lived on a track of land in Charles County, Maryland. After a group of republicans rejected Maryland's royalist government, John served in some representative capacity in local government. With Royalist government restored in Maryland in the early 1660s, John and Johanna moved to settlements in Albemarle Sound in the early 1660s. These settlements were highly egalitarian, peopled by refugees, outcasts, and egalitarians who had battled against aristocracy and monarchy in the English Civil Wars. Radically egalitarian religious groups such as the Quakers, who had been persecuted and driven out of Massachusetts and Virginia, found a warm reception in Albemarle. The English settlers around Albemarle cultivated and maintained unusually respectful relations with the region's Native American groups.

In 1670 he was deputy of the Earl of Craven and had risen to the dignity of Colonel, and was senior member of the Council.

When Governor Carteret left Albemarle in April 1672 and went to England, he authorized Colonel Jenkins as deputy governor. As acting governor, Jenkins welcomed radical Quakers such as George Fox to the colony. Jenkins remained De facto governor for more than three years. By fall 1675, the colonists had established a new assembly, which was led by Thomas Eastchurch. Eastchurch had Jenkins imprisoned and assumed the role of the Governor of General Assembly of North Carolina. However, in the spring of 1676, Johanna Jenkins rallied her husband's allies and had him released from prison. Now free, Jenkins forced Eastchurch out of Albemarle. When Virginians who had been involved in Bacon's Rebellion had to flee, Jenkins welcomed them to Albemarle, where they would be safe from retribution by Virginia Governor Berkeley. Under Jenkins, settlers in Albemarle had also developed trade relations with New England merchants, who gladly worked with the Albemarle settlers to evade imperial customs duties.

Royalists such as Thomas Miller and Thomas Eastchurch informed officials in London that Jenkins was allowing democracy to flourish in Albemarle and that he and others were working with New England merchants, who were already suspect in London. Miller, promising to restore royal rule and eliminate the radicalism that pervaded the Albemarle settlements, managed to have himself appointed governor. However, Miller did not serve long, as the Albemarle settlers, led by Jenkins, plotted Miller's overthrow. The series of event took place known as Culpeper's Rebellion, leading to the arrest of Miller and Jenkins' elevation to governor by popular acclaim. The rebel government held position to the end of 1678, and the assembly met in the home of John and Johanna Jenkins. During that time, the radically democratic Albemarle republic became, in the words of one Royalist official, a haven for "negros, Indians and English servants." As the southern colonies became more heavily dominated by white planters committed to black slavery, servants, slaves, and other democrats fled to the Jenkins' Albemarle settlements. More than anywhere in colonial America, the Albemarle settlements led by John and Johanna Jenkins became a multi-racial democracy where women exercised political influence. In 1679 John Harvey assumed the position, but died six months later. The council elected Jenkins acting governor. In this position he served up to his death in Perquimans County, North Carolina, on 17 December 1681.

== Personal life ==
John Jenkins is believed to have graduated from Clare College, Cambridge in 1642. Jenkins married twice. He was survived by Johanna, who later married Thomas Harvey (North Carolina governor). No exact data is stored about the heirs of Jenkins, also it might be that he had a daughter Joanna Jenkins.
