= John Harvey (Albemarle) =

Acting Governor of Albemarle County, Carolina from February to August 1679

Acting Governor of Albemarle County, Carolina
- In office February 1679 – August 1679
- Preceded by: Seth Sothel
- Succeeded by: John Jenkins

Personal details
- Born: c. 1628 England
- Died: 1679 Albemarle County, Carolina
- Spouse: Dorothy Tooke
- Children: Robert, Richard and Thomas Harvey

John Harvey (died 1679) was the acting governor of Albemarle County, Carolina from in 1679.

== Early life ==
Harvey was born between 1628 and 1630, in Warwickshire, England, to Thomas and Mary Harvey. His family settled in Virginia around 1640. He emigrated to Albemarle County (modern Perquimans County), North Carolina, in 1659.

== Career ==
John Harvey probably bought the peninsula known as Harvey's Neck, NC, in the Albemarle Sound. Many historians believe him to be the first settler of Albemarle. Harvey was one of the leaders of the region's anti-property faction. He was respected by the population of the colony, even among his political rivals. He started his political career serving in the Samuel Stephen’s council and the Governments of Peter Carteret and John Jenkins, services he exercised until 1676.

During Culpeper's Rebellion, Harvey captured Marshal General (High Sheriff) of Albemarle Edward Wade, when the rebellion started.

In February 1679 he was appointed chairman and acting governor, after the news came that the former governor, Seth Sothel, had been captured by pirates. His administration as governor ended with his premature death in January 1680, in Albemarle County.

== Personal life ==
Harvey married Dorothy Tooke, in Isle Of Wight County, Virginia. Their three children were Robert, Richard and Thomas Harvey (future deputy governor of North Carolina).
