= Richard Stephens (burgess) =

English emigrant to colonial Virginia

- Died: c. 1636
- Occupations: Merchant, painter-stainer
- Spouse: Elizabeth Peirsey
- Children: Samuel Stephens; William Stephens

Captain Richard Stephens (b. 1585 in Wiltshire, England – 1636) was a merchant and described "painter-stainer" (which was an investor in the Virginia Company of London). Stephens arrived to Colony of Virginia as an unmarried man of means, with two to four servants, on February 16 1624 [O.S. February 1623] aboard the George. Stephens was an experienced military man and quickly began to establish himself in the colony by acquiring land, and was soon named burgess in the colony. After building a blockhouse and receiving a patent on the same, the captain was issued the first English land grant in the colony as incentive for other landowners to follow his example and build gardens within their property holdings. Captain Stephens amassed nearly 2000 acres. Stephens married Elizabeth Peircy (b. 1600), daughter of Abraham Piercy, cape merchant of Jamestown. They had four sons: John, William, Richard Lawrence, and Samuel.

Stephens fought the first duel in the English colonies after an argument with George Harrison, the latter being struck just below the knee. Harrison died two weeks later, though not from the wound, but some other malady of the time. Such an encounter in North America was not to be repeated for some 100 years.

As burgess, Stephens (and local citizenry as well) often found themselves at odds with the then governor of Jamestown, Governor John Harvey. During a heated conversation, Harvey attacked Stephens with a cane or cudgel, knocking out a number of his teeth. The governor was eventually deposed and sent back to England, where he faced charges for numerous mistreatments of members of the colony. Upon the Stephens' death, Elizabeth Piercy Stephens married Governor Harvey. Richard Stephens died at the age of 33 or 34, and was subsequently buried in Jamestown's Fort James Cemetery.

Two of Stephens' sons, Samuel and Richard (II), also made names for themselves in the New World. Samuel Stephens rose to prominence and become the second governor of the Albemarle Settlements of North Carolina. Richard Lawrence Stephens for a time dropped his last name as a protective measure as commander of the garrison at Bacon's Castle in the mid-1670s, during Bacon's Rebellion.
