= Henry Holloway (pirate) =

17th-century pirate

- Occupation: Pirate
- Years active: 1687
- Piratical career
- Base of operations: American east coast

Henry Holloway (fl. 1687) was a pirate active off the American east coast, from South Carolina to Maine.

== History ==
Holloway was recorded as capturing a small ship which had left Barbados for the Carolinas in 1687. He took some of the crew prisoner and sailed north, anchoring for a time in Casco Bay, Maine. While there at least one of the prisoners escaped and petitioned a local English official for assistance in returning to Barbados. Local rumor had it that Holloway may have buried some of his treasure on Maine’s Jewell Island.

John Boone was a member of South Carolina Governor James Colleton’s Grand Council in Charleston. The Lords Proprietors in England wrote to Colleton on March 3, 1687, accusing Boone of smuggling supplies to Holloway and helping hide his plunder. Boone was expelled from the Council but was subsequently reappointed, causing the Lords Proprietors great consternation:

"Lords Proprietors of Carolina to Governor James Colleton. ... We see by the Minutes of Council that there was evidence that Mr. John Boone had not only helped the pirates Chapman and Holloway with victuals, but had taken and concealed part of their stolen goods, for which he was rightly expelled [from] the Grand Council. But we hear since that he is again chosen, and is sitting in the Grand Council. This must not be. Men convicted of such misdemeanours must not be chosen again and restored. You will put him out, and see that another is chosen in his place. We are sorry to see the proneness of the Parliament of Carolina to such proceedings, and hope that they will not occur again."

At least one researcher thinks "Chapman and Holloway" may have been aliases of buccaneers John Markham and Bartholomew Sharp, stopping to resupply after a raid on Campeche.

== See also ==
Other pirates who escaped justice with help from local Charleston residents and officials:

- Charles Yeats, who was able to buy and bribe his way into a pardon in Charleston
- Stede Bonnet, who was jailed but escaped with the help of a Charleston merchant and ex-pirate
