= Thomas Eastchurch =

Governor of Albemarle County, Carolina from 1675 to 1676

5th Governor of Albemarle County, Carolina
- In office 1675–1676
- Preceded by: John Jenkins
- Succeeded by: John Jenkins

Personal details
- Died: January 1678 Jamestown, Virginia

Thomas Eastchurch (died January 1678) was fifth governor of Albemarle County, Carolina from 1675 to 1676.

During his time in office, he imprisoned the former governor John Jenkins for various offenses. Jenkins was later released from prison with the aid of his supporters and reclaimed his position as governor in the spring of 1676. After Eastchurch explained the situation in London to the Lords Proprietors, they reappointed him as governor.

In 1677, he left London to celebrate his honeymoon in Nevis Island. During his absence, his fellow proprietary Thomas Miller acted as governor. Miller's crimes created a revolt and Eastchurch, upon return to Albemarle, was unable to help the government recover. In addition, the Anti-Proprietors' leaders decided to send an army to the northern part of the Albemarle County to prevent the new governor from accessing Albemarle. Although Eastchurch sought aid to invade the county, he never got it. He did not return to the government of Albemarle until after the spring of 1676.

== Biography ==
=== Early years ===
Many details about Eastchurch's childhood are largely unknown. A description provided by Lords Proprietors stated that Eastchurch was raised in a very wealthy family. In October 1669 he worked as surveyor general of Albemarle County (although he aspired to be Governor of Albemarle County). An influential relative of Eastchurch, Thomas Clifford, recommended Eastchurch to the Lords Proprietors for the government of Albemarle.

=== Governor of Albemarle ===
In the September 1675 Albemarle County elections, the faction of Eastchurch was elected to govern the General Assembly of North Carolina. Eastchurch was appointed governor and Speaker of the Assembly. However, he only used this last title, never that of governor. In fall 1675, after beginning his government, Eastchurch imprisoned Jenkins for various offences. However, in the spring of 1676, supporters of Jenkins helped him to get out from prison and return the charge of governor of the region. Eastchurch travelled to London, together to his fellow proprietary Thomas Miller, in order "to appeal to the Lords Proprietors".

Eastchurch's achievement convinced the Lords Proprietors that the problems in Albemarle were caused by the leaders of the anti-proprietary faction. The proprietors decided to appoint Eastchurch as governor of the region, as well as of the rivers Pamplico and News, while Miller become a council member, secretary, and customs collector.

=== Revolt and difficulties to access to government ===
In the summer of 1677, Eastchurch and Miller left London and embarked to Albemarle. However, they stopped temporarily in the Nevis Island, where Eastchurch met and married a rich heiress. Eastchurch decided to go on a honeymoon with her, staying on the island longer. While away, he appointed Miller as Interim Governor and President of the Executive Council of Albemarle. However, after the beginning of his administration in Albemarle, Miller was imprisoned because of crimes he apparently committed in the region and the riots that these crimes instigated. (Note: Miller increased the taxes, causing them to be elevated, and he destined public money to cover the salary of his armed guards. In addition, he jailed to Zachariah Gillam for customs violations and he also attempt imprison to George Durant, the leader of the anti-proprietary faction, so Eastchurch sent them to Albemarle.)

Although Eastchurch arrived in Virginia in December 1678, he could not occupy the governor's charge of Albemarle because a revolt was developing there. Eastchurch demanded several things: the resignation of the colonists to their guns, release of prisoners from prison, restoration of Miller's government, and the formation of a delegation with the aim to visit Virginia to learn and explain the origin of the revolt.

Eastchurch's demands were rejected, but Eastchurch was able to halt the advancement of the trial against Miller. Anti-Proprietors leaders decided to send an army to the northern part of Albemarle County with the intent of preventing the new governor from entering Albemarle. Eastchurch decided to invade Albemarle County, and wanted to form an army in the Virginia colony. He sought help from Virginia Governor William Berkeley to assemble the troops, but Berkeley refused to accept the invasion and Eastchurch was never able to invade the county. Eastchurch died of fever in January 1678, in Jamestown, Virginia.
