= Henderson Walker =

American governor

Deputy Governor of North Carolina Acting
- In office 1699–1704
- Preceded by: Thomas Harvey
- Succeeded by: Robert Daniell

Personal details
- Born: 1659 Unknown
- Died: 14 April 1704 (aged 44–45) Edenton, North Carolina
- Resting place: St. Paul's Church, Edenton; 36°03′40.6″N 76°36′31.8″W
- Spouse(s): Deborah Green; Ann Lillington

Henderson Walker (1659-1704) was the Acting Deputy Governor of North Carolina from 1699 to 1704. He is better known for his contribution in the founding of the Church of England in the Albemarle Sound region.

== Early years ==
Henderson Walker was born in 1659 and died in 1704. He arrived in Albemarle County around 1682. There he owned land, and raised livestock for selling. Henderson was a clerk of the county courts, and later was appointed to many other public offices. He served at different times as attorney general (from October 1695), judge of the supreme court, and President of the Council, making many judicial reforms. He was also a judge of the General Court, Court of Chancery, and Admiralty Court, assemblyman, and customs collector. He participated in the Colonial Council in 1694, under Governor Thomas Harvey. In March 1699, he was chosen to serve as boundary commissioner. The purpose of his promotion was to contribute to the resolution of the conflict over the borders of the Virginia colony.

== Acting governor of North Carolina ==
In 1699, after the death of Harvey, Walker was named the Acting Deputy Governor of North Carolina. However, he never was deputy by the governor at Charleston. His government led to an era of peace and economic growth in North Carolina. Thus, many Virginians traveled to North Carolina (and South) to achieve economic improvements. However, the English Crown sought to weaken proprietary colonies, so Walker was often forced to decide whether to help the Lords Proprietors or to support the monarch. He chose the Crown, helping to found the local Church of England.

He managed to pass the called Vestry Act in 1701, which levied taxes on North Carolinian's; the tithing tax had two objectives: finance the Anglican churches and serve as a salary for the ministers. Parishes and churches were established (although the clergy became very important in policy of the colony, which upset many residents of the colony), and a public levy was created. He also secured control of the colonial assembly. Attempting to turn the Anglican religion into the official religion of the colony, he began to create a "church party" in North Carolina, which caused an ongoing "conflict between churchmen and dissenters". This conflict promoted a rebellion against him, called Cary's Rebellion, and, later, the so-called Regulator Rebellion.

In 1703 the Meherrin, a Native American people, was accused of attacking the settlers. They were charged with "destroying and burning their stock and timber houses, refusing to pay tribute" and to accept government laws. That year, Henderson Walker resigned from the governor's office, replaced by Robert Daniel. But he continued to being a council's member. He was chosen as its president in 1703, but he only presided over it until 1704. He also served as a member of the court of justice.

Walker died in Edenton, North Carolina, on 14 April 1704. Although he was originally buried at his plantation, located near the Albemarle Sound, he was later reburied in the graveyard at St. Paul's Church, Edenton.

== Personal life ==
In April 1686 Walker married Deborah Green; they had a daughter named Elizabeth. In February 1694 Walker married Ann Lillington, but they had no children.
