= List of rulers of Mombasa =

Before 1502, the East African city of Mombasa was part of the Kilwa Sultanate. The independent Mombasa sultanate named Mvita (Swahili) or Manbasa (Arabic) was then established but was conquered by the Portuguese Empire during the 16th century. After this control alternated between the Portuguese and the Sultanate of Oman, before the establishment of the British East Africa Protectorate in 1887. Mombasa became part of independent Kenya in 1963.

Tenure	Incumbent	Notes
Portuguese Suzerainty
1593 to 1596	Mateus de Vasconcelos, Captain-Major
1596 to 1598	António de Andrade, Captain-Major
1598 to 1606	Rui Soares de Melo, Captain-Major
1606 to 1609	Gaspar Pereira, Captain-Major
1609 to 1610	Pedro de Abreu, Captain-Major
1610 to 1614	Manuel Pereira, Captain-Major
1614 to 1620	Simão Pereira, Captain-Major
1620 to 1625	Francisco Pereira, Captain-Major
1625 to 1629	Marçal de Macedo, Captain-Major
1629 to 15 August 1631	Pedro de Gambôa, Captain-Major
15 August 1631 to 1635	Pedro Botelho, Captain-Major
1635 to 1638	Francisco de Seixas e Cabreira, Captain-Major	1st Term
Portuguese Colony under Goa
1638 to 1639	Francisco de Seixas e Cabreira, Captain-Major	1st Term
1639 to 1642	Martim Manuel, Captain-Major
1642 to 1643	...., Captain-Major
1643 to 1646	Manuel Coutinho, Captain-Major
1646 to 1651	António de Meneses, Captain-Major
1651 to 1653	Francisco de Seixas e Cabreira, Captain-Major	2nd Term
1653 to 1658	..., Captain-Major
1658 to 1663	José da Silva, Captain-Major
1663 to 1667	Manuel de Campos, Captain-Major
1667 to 1670	João Cota, Captain-Major
1670 to 1671	vacant
1671 to 1673	João da Costa, Captain-Major
1673 to 1676	Manuel de Campos, Captain-Major
1676 to 1679	Francisco Faria, Captain-Major
1679 to 16??	Manuel Franco, Captain-Major
16?? to 1682	Pedro Henriques, Captain-Major
1682 to 1686	João Portugal, Captain-Major
1688 to 1693	Duarte de Melo, Captain-Major
1693 to 1694	Pascual Sarmento, Captain-Major
1694 to 1696	João Leão, Captain-Major
1696 to 1697	Antonio de Melo, Captain-Major
1697 to 1698	Dau, príncipe de Faza, Captain-Major
1698 to 12 December 1698	Leonardo Barbosa Souto-Maior, Captain-Major
Omani Suzerainty
Wali (Swahili: Liwali) (Governors)
12 December 1698 to December 1698	Imam Sa‘if ibn Sultan, Wali
December 1698 to 12 March 1728	Nasr ibn Abdallah al-Mazru‘i, Wali
Portuguese Suzerainty
Portuguese Colony under Goa
12 March 1728 to 21 September 1729	Álvaro Caetano de Melo Castro, Captain-Major
Omani Suzerainty
Wali (Swahili: Liwali) (Governors)
1729 to 1735	..., Wali
1735 to 1739	Sa‘id al-Hadermi, Wali
1739 to 1745	Muhammad ibn Uthman al-Mazru‘i, Wali
1746	‘Ali ibn Uthman al-Mazru‘i, Wali
Independent (disputed with Oman)
1746 to 1755	Sultan ‘Ali ibn Uthman al-Mazru‘i
1755 to 1773	Sultan Masud ibn Naisr al-Mazru‘i
1773 to 1782	Sultan Abdallah ibn Muhammad al-Mazru‘i
1782 to 1811	Sultan Ahmad ibn Muhammad al-Mazru‘i
1812 to 1823	Sultan ‘Abd Allah ibn Ahmad al-Mazru‘i
Omani Suzerainty
1823 to 1826	Sultan Sulayman ibn ‘Ali al-Mazru‘i
1826 to March 1835	Salim ibn Ahmad al-Mazru‘i, Wali
March 1835 to 1836	Nasur ibn Ahmad al-Mazru‘i, Wali
1836 to 1837	Rashid ibn Salim al-Mazru‘i
1837 to 24 June 1837	Khamis ibn Rashid al-Mazru‘i
1837 to 1860	Abdallah ibn Hamish al-Mazru‘i
1860 to 1873	Mubarrak ibn Rashid al-Mazru‘i
1873 to 1 July 1895	Rashid ibn Hamish al-Mazru‘i
British Suzerainty
British Protectorate
9 February 1824 to 13 February 1824	William Fitzwilliam Owen, Governor
13 February 1824 to 29 May 1824	John James Reitz, Governor
29 May 1824 to September 1824	vacant
September 1824 to 25 July 1826	J.B. Emery, Governor
Zanzibari Suzerainty
24 June 1837	Annexed by Zanzibar
British Suzerainty
25 May 1887	Administration handed to the British East Africa Association
1 July 1895	Kenya protectorate coastal strip nominally under Zanzibari sovereignty
12 December 1963	Incorporated into independent Kenya

== See also ==
- Kenya
  - Heads of State of Kenya
  - Heads of Government of Kenya
  - Colonial Heads of Kenya
- Lists of incumbents
