= Samuel Stephens (North Carolina governor) =

Governor of Albemarle County from 1667 to 1669

2nd Governor of Albemarle County, Carolina
- In office 1667–1669
- Preceded by: William Drummond
- Succeeded by: Peter Carteret

Personal details
- Born: 1629 Jamestown, Virginia
- Died: 1669 (aged 39–40) Albemarle County, Carolina
- Spouse: Frances Culpepper

Samuel Stephens (1629 – 1669) was the second governor of Albemarle County, Carolina from 1667 until his death in 1669.

== Biography ==
Stephens was born in Jamestown, Virginia and was the first governor of a colony to be born in America. His parents were Richard Stephens and Elizabeth Piersey Stephens. In 1652, Stephens married Frances Culpepper, the sister of Lord John Culpeper. They had no children. They owned Boldrup Plantation in Warwick County, Virginia.

Before King Charles II of England established the Province of Carolina, Stephens had served as "Commander of the Southern Plantation" for the Colony of Virginia between 1662 and 1664. The "Southern Plantation" roughly corresponded to what would later be northeastern North Carolina. Stephens died while serving as Governor.
