= James Colleton =

Colonial governor of South Carolina (died c. 1706)

7th Governor of South Carolina
- In office 1686–1690
- Monarchs: Mary II; William III
- Preceded by: Joseph Morton
- Succeeded by: Seth Sothell

Personal details
- Died: 1706 Barbados
- Resting place: St. John's Parish Church, Barbados

James Colleton (d. c. 1706) was a governor of the English proprietary Province of Carolina from 1686 to 1690.

== Biography ==
Son of Sir John Colleton, one of the colony's founders, he took over some of the family's landholdings in Barbados before being appointed governor by the colony's proprietors. Upon his arrival in the colony he put a stop to a planned expedition against Spanish St. Augustine, after the 1686 Spanish Invasion of South Carolina. Since England and Spain were then at peace, the proprietors approved his action, much to the annoyance of the local leaders, including Joseph Morton. He further angered the colonists by maintaining the government according to the colony's Fundamental Constitutions in the face of popular opposition.

In 1687 the Lords Proprietors wrote to Colleton, angry that a member of his Grand Council had been abetting pirates. John Boone had been removed from the Council for smuggling supplies to Henry Holloway and a pirate named Chapman, and helping hide their loot. The Proprietors excoriated Colleton when Boone was allowed back on the Council: "This must not be. Men convicted of such misdemeanours must not be chosen again and restored. ... We are sorry to see the proneness of the Parliament of Carolina to such proceedings, and hope that they will not occur again."

By 1690 Colleton and the provincial assembly were at loggerheads, and Colleton attempted to rule without the assembly. This resulted in open resistance to his rule, prompting him to declare martial law, although he quickly retracted this when he could not even control the militia. He was turned out of office by the arrival in 1690 of Seth Sothel, one of the proprietors.

Colleton was the Speaker of the House of Assembly of Barbados from 1700 to 1701.
