= List of colonial governors of North Carolina =

This is a list of the colonial governors of North Carolina.

== Governors of Roanoke and Raleigh ==
- Sir Ralph Lane, governor of Roanoke (1585–1586)
- John White, governor of Raleigh (1587–1590)

== Governors of Albemarle County, 1664–1689 ==
Governor	Took office	Left office
William Drummond	1664	1667
Samuel Stephens	1667	1669
Peter Carteret	1670	1672
John Jenkins	1672	1675
Thomas Eastchurch	1675	1676
John Jenkins	1676	1677
Thomas Miller	1677	1677
John Harvey	1679	1679
Henry Wilkinson (Note: Appointed, but never took office.)	—	—
John Jenkins	1680	1681
Seth Sothel	1682	1689

== Deputy governors of North Carolina, 1691–1712 ==
- Thomas Jarvis 1691–1694
- Thomas Harvey 1694–1699
- Henderson Walker 1699–1704 (acting)
- Robert Daniell 1704–1705
- Thomas Cary 1705–1706
- William Glover 1706–1708 (acting)
- Thomas Cary 1708–1711

== See also ==
- List of governors of North Carolina
- List of first ladies and gentlemen of North Carolina
- List of colonial governors of South Carolina
- Province of Carolina
- Province of North Carolina
