= Thomas Harvey (North Carolina governor) =

2nd Deputy Governor of North Carolina
- In office 1694–1699
- Preceded by: Thomas Jarvis
- Succeeded by: Henderson Walker (Acting)

Personal details
- Born: 1668 Berkeley Precinct, Albemarle County (modern Perquimans County), North Carolina
- Died: c. 1699 Albemarle County
- Spouse(s): Johanna Jenkins; Sarah Laker
- Children: 3

Thomas Harvey (1668–1699) was the Deputy Governor of North Carolina from 1694 to 1699.

== Early life ==
Harvey was born in 1668, in Berkeley Precinct, Albemarle County (modern Perquimans County), North Carolina, to John and Mary Harvey. He had two brothers: Robert and Richard, and was cousin of former governor of Albemarle Sound John Harvey.

== Career ==
In March 1683 Harvey was a county court justice. He was a member on the colonial council from 1683 to 1695, serving as its president between 1692 and 1695.

He was appointed deputy governor of North Carolina in 1694. Harvey and his council established the "proprietors's liberal land policies" and he reorganized the colonial government. In December 1696, Harvey created another county in North Carolina in modern Bath, because settlers had created settlements in places beyond Albemarle County. The tensions between North Carolina and Virginia increased over a border dispute (along with other issues). His term ended in 1699.

== Personal life ==
Harvey married two times: In the first of them, he married widow of John Jenkins, Joanna, on 13 April 1682. After the death of her (on March 27, 1688), he married Sarah Laker in Perquimans County, North Carolina. Harvey and Laker had three children: John (who died young), Thomas, and Mary. He died on July 3, 1699, in Albemarle County.
