= George Durant =

George Durant (October 1, 1632 – February 6, 1692) was an attorney, Attorney General and Speaker of the House of Burgesses in the Province of Carolina. He is sometimes called the "father of North Carolina".

== Biography ==
Durant was born in England to William Durant and Alice Pell. Prior to July 1658 he resided for a time in Northumberland County, Virginia, where he had purchased 300 acres (120 ha). He married Ann Marwood on January 4, 1658, and shortly thereafter moved to Nansemond County, Virginia, where he lived for about two years.

Durant was associated with Nathaniel Batts, a fur trader, and Richard Batts, a sea captain, and together with them explored the Albemarle Sound area of Virginia.

On August 4, 1661, Durant purchased, in the second oldest recorded deed of the area, (Note: On Sept. 24, 1660 Nathaniel Batts purchased from Kiscutanewh, king of the Weapemeoc (Yeopim) Indians, all the land on the west bank of the Pasquotank River from its mouth to the head of New Begin Creek. This transaction, which survives in the records of Lower Norfolk County, Virginia, is the oldest known surviving North Carolina land deed.) land from Cisketando, king of the Weapemeoc (Yeopim) Indian tribe. On March 13, 1662, a second purchase was made from Kilcocanen, another Yeopim. By 1662 Durant was living in Virginia on property adjacent to the Albemarle Sound, which became part of the Carolina colony in 1665. His plantation, called "Wicocombe" (subsequently known as "Durant's Neck"), was located in Perquimans County, North Carolina. The exact location of his home is unknown, but the present town of Durant, on the peninsula between the Perquimans River and the Little River, lies on the neck of land five miles east of Edenton, that was sold to George Durant by the two Indian leaders.

A mariner turned planter, Durant was one of the ablest and most influential men in the county and a leader of the 1677 Culpeper's Rebellion, an uprising over the requirement that all colonial goods be transported in British ships. Durant's open opposition to Seth Sothel, one of the Lords Proprietor, led to his arrest and imprisonment. But when Sothel confiscated 2,000 acres (810 ha) of Durant's property, residents of the Albemarle region rose in defense of Durant and banished Sothel from the area.

The Durant family Bible, printed in 1599 and brought by Durant to the New World, is displayed in a locked cabinet at the University of North Carolina at Chapel Hill.

Durant died on February 6, 1692, at the age of 59.
