= Peter Carteret =

Governor of Albemarle County, Carolina from 1670 to August 1672

3rd Governor of Albemarle County, Carolina
- In office 1670–1672
- Preceded by: Samuel Stephens
- Succeeded by: John Jenkins

Personal details
- Born: 1641 Jersey, England
- Died: c. 1672 England

Peter Carteret (1641 – c. 1672) was the third governor of Albemarle County, Carolina from 1670 to 1672.

== Early life and career ==
Carteret was born in Jersey, England to Helier de Carteret and Rachel La Cloche Carteret.

Carteret was appointed assistant governor of the Albemarle colony by the Lords Proprietor in 1664. Proprietor Sir George Carteret was Peter Carteret's fourth cousin. Peter Cateret was the brother of Philip Carteret. After Governor Samuel Stephens died in late 1669, the governor's council named Carteret acting governor. As Governor, Cateret was responsible for implementing the Fundamental Constitutions of Carolina.

He seems to have been appointed to the post permanently by the Lords Proprietor in 1670 and then left for England in 1672 to talk to the Proprietors about discontent in the colony. He appointed John Jenkins as his deputy, to act in his place, but Carteret never returned to the colony, despite an apparent desire to do so. Instead, in November 1676, Carteret ended up giving power of attorney over his interests in the region to William Crawford, who proceeded to liquidate those interests.
