= Albemarle County, North Carolina =

Former county in North Carolina

- County
- County of Albemarle
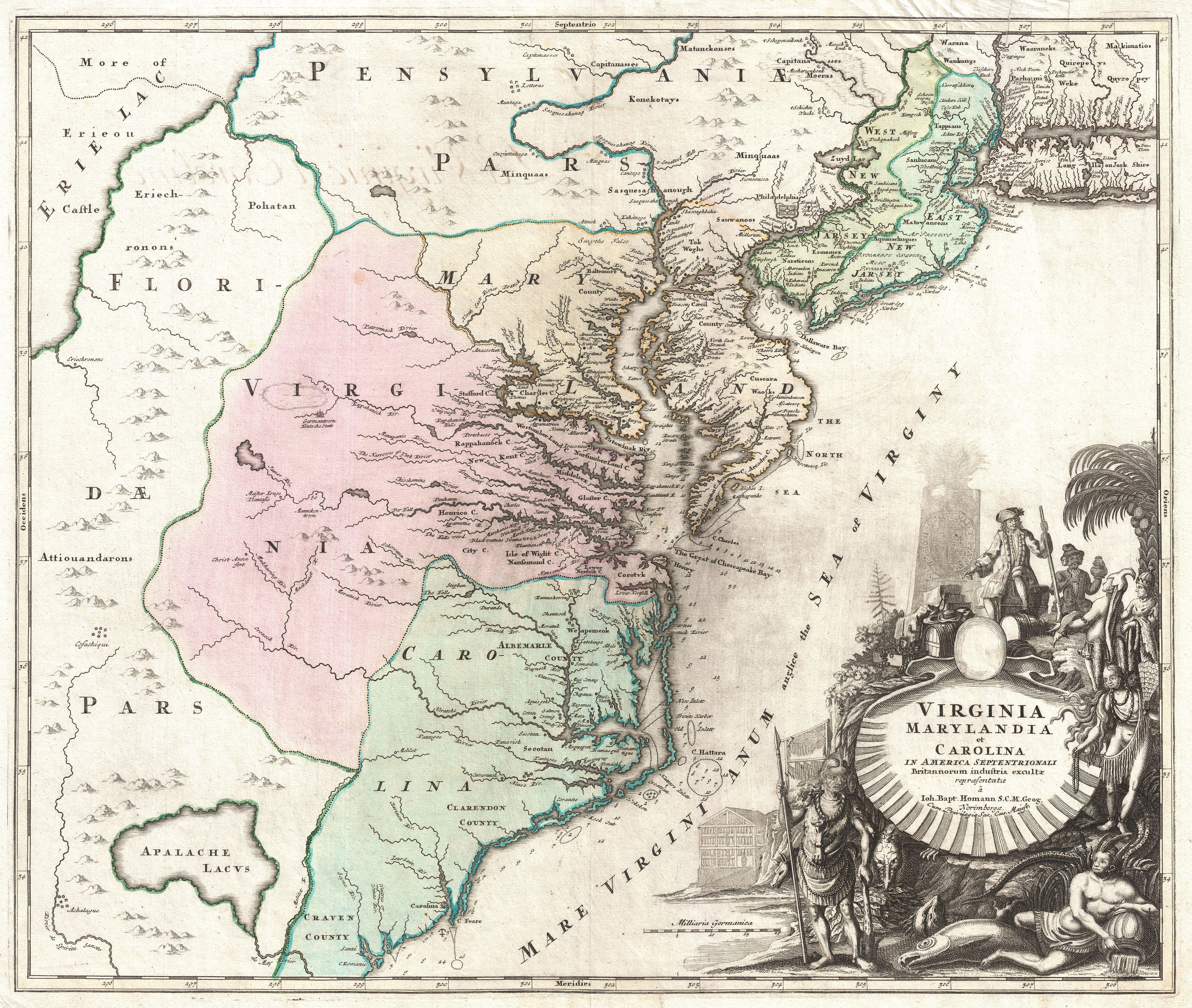
- Map of Virginia, Maryland, and Carolina

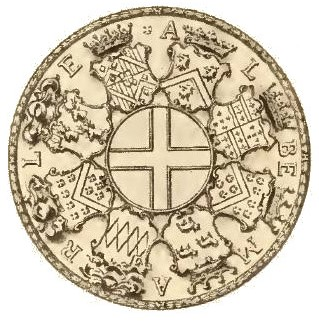
- Seal

- Location within North Carolina
- Coordinates: 36.314°N 76.340°W
- Country: Great Britain
- Province: North Carolina
- Founded: 1664
- Abolished: March 25, 1739
- Named for: George, Duke of Albemarle

Area
  - Total: 4,300 km^{2} (1,660 sq mi)

Albemarle County, officially the County of Albemarle, was a county located in the British province of North Carolina that existed from 1664 until 1739; when the General Assembly partitioned it into present-day Chowan, Currituck, Pasquotank, and Perquimans counties.

== History ==
Albemarle County was named for George, Duke of Albemarle, one of the eight Lords Proprietors of the Province of Carolina, for whom the Albemarle Sound is also named. It contained approximately 1,600 square miles of territory, though its boundaries were not precise. Under the original divisions of the province, the county to the south of Albemarle was called Clarendon County and centered on the Cape Fear region, but was only briefly occupied in the 1660s. Bath County was organized in 1696 and lay more closely to the south.

By 1671, three precincts of Albemarle County had been formed: Shaftesbury, Carteret, and Berkeley. From 1675 to 1677, the Chowanoc War took place in the county. In 1681, Berkeley was renamed Perquimans, and by 1685 Shaftesbury became Chowan. By 1689 the county ceased to function as a governmental unit, replaced by Chowan, Currituck, Pasquotank, and Perquimans precincts.

From the four precincts, Carteret was divided into Currituck and Pasquotank in about 1685, Bertie Precinct was formed from part of Chowan in 1722, consisting of all territory west of the Chowan River. Tyrrell Precinct was created in 1729 from parts of Chowan, Bertie, Pasquotank, and Currituck. Local residents asked that the western part of Bertie be divided into a new precinct as early as 1732, which led to the creation of Edgecombe Precinct (dates of the formation of Edgecombe vary from 1732 to 1741).

Albemarle County was disestablished on March 25, 1739; when the North Carolina General Assembly partitioned it into the present-day Chowan, Currituck, Pasquotank, and Perquimans counties.

== See also ==
- List of former United States counties
