= South Carolina slave codes =

Part of historical South Carolina law

South Carolina established its first slave code in 1695. The code was based on the 1684 Jamaica slave code, which was in turn based on the 1661 Barbados Slave Code. The South Carolina slave code was the model for other North American colonies. Georgia adopted the South Carolina code in 1770, and Florida adopted the Georgia code.

== Background ==
In 1670 The Province of Carolina was founded by well known leaders and Barbadian Adventurers including John Yeamans, Sir John Colleton, Thomas Modyford, and Peter Colleton. Planters from the overpopulated English sugar island of Barbados brought relatively large numbers of African slaves from that island to establish new plantations.

Thomas Modyford in particular had a prominent role in the transmission of Barbadian labor practices and especially the Barbadian slave code to other colonies such as South Carolina.

== Specific provisions ==
The 1712 South Carolina slave code established positions of the state's racial groups. "Negroes and other slaves brought unto the people of this Province for that purpose, are of barbarous, wild, savage natures, and such as renders them wholly unqualified to be governed by the laws, customs, and practices of this Province."

The slave code included provisions such as:

- Slaves were forbidden to leave the owner's property unless they were accompanied by a white person or had permission. If a slave leaves the owner's property without permission, "every white person" is required to chastise such slaves.
- Any slave attempting to run away and leave the colony (later the state) receives the death penalty.
- Any slave who evades capture for 20 days or more is to be publicly whipped for the first offense, branded with the letter R on the right cheek for the second offense, and lose one ear if absent for 30 days for the third offense, and castrated for the fourth offense.
- Owners refusing to abide by the slave code are fined and forfeit ownership of their slaves.
- Slave homes are to be searched every two weeks for weapons or stolen goods. Punishment for violations escalates to include loss of ear, branding, and nose-slitting, and, for the fourth offense, death.
- No slave is allowed to work for pay; plant corn, peas or rice; keep hogs, cattle, or horses; own or operate a boat; buy or sell; or to wear clothes finer than 'Negro cloth.'

The South Carolina slave code was revised in 1739 with the following amendments:

- No slave is to be taught to write, to work on Sunday, or to work more than 15 hours per day in summer, and 14 hours in winter.
- Willful killing of a slave exacts a fine of £700, "passion"-killing £350.
- The fine for concealing runaway slaves is $1,000 and a prison sentence of up to one year.
- A fine of $100 and six months in prison are imposed for employing any black or slave as a clerk.
- A fine of $100 and six months in prison are imposed on anyone selling or giving alcoholic beverages to slaves.
- A fine of $100 and six months in prison are imposed for teaching a slave to read and write, and death is the penalty for circulating incendiary literature.
- Freeing a slave is forbidden, except by deed, and after 1820, permission of the legislature (Georgia required legislative approval after 1801).

Some elements of the codes were rarely or laxly enforced as they imposed costs or limitations upon (politically powerful) slaveowners. For instance, well after 1712, slaves commonly worked for hire in Charleston.
