= Barbadian Adventurers =

The Barbadian Adventurers were groups of English-descended colonists who migrated from the English colony of Barbados to establish and settle the Province of Carolina.

== Overview ==
In the mid 17th century following proposals made by Thomas Modyford and Peter Colleton, Barbadians began large-scale migration from Barbados to the areas of North and South Carolina, becoming among some of the first resident settlers in those states. This was largely due to the overpopulation of plantation owners and enslaved people on the island of Barbados.

The first English settlement in South Carolina was made in 1670, when three shiploads of emigrants from Barbados sailed up the Ashley River. The first ship to land was the Carolina, in April 1670. It was followed shortly by the Port Royal and the Three Brothers. These three ships left Barbados with 150 people on board; two died en route. The settlers pitched their tents on its banks and built a town, which has since wholly disappeared.

Ten years later, a more favorable site for the town, between the Cooper and Ashley Rivers, was chosen. This is where Charles Town was founded in 1680, where it remains today with the slightly altered name Charleston. Since the Barbadians had been in the "plantation" business for decades, they brought this concept and its associated culture to Charles Town in the 1670s.

Roughly 80% of all European settlers in colonial South Carolina were of English origins, however many of them did not come straight from England but rather came to Carolina from Barbados.

One group of the Adventurers, consisting of small planters, craftsmen, sons of large planters and white indentured servants who completed their indenture, settled in Goose Creek, where they became known as the "Goose Creek Men". The group, which focused upon their trade in Native and African slaves, became a major political clique in the Carolina colony in opposition to the interests of the Lords proprietors. The Goose Creek Men also brought with them the parish system and a strong allegiance to Anglicanism, which led to resentment against non-Anglican sects encouraged by the Lords Proprietors to migrate to the Carolina colony, including Quakers, Huguenots, English Baptist, and Scottish Presbyterians. Several colonial governors were Goose Creek men, such as James Moore and Robert Daniell.

The Barbadian Adventurers also brought with them the Barbados Slave Code, a legal code for the management of large populations of enslaved people. The code was initially developed in Barbados in 1661, then Jamaica in 1684, before being adopted in Carolina in 1695 as the Carolina slave codes. The Carolina slave codes would subsequently be adopted in Georgia in 1770, and Florida would adopt the Georgia code soon after becoming a territory of the United States in 1821.

The Barbadian Adventurers, especially the Goose Creek Men, were also tied with the growth of enslavement of Native Americans, with Henry Woodward helping establish slave trading with some Native tribes. Estimates are that Carolinians exported 24,000-51,000 slaves to markets from Boston to Barbados. This eventually resulted in an indigenous alliance of tribes against the colonists, which resulted in the Yamasee War.

== Notable Barbadian Adventurers ==
- John Yeamans
- Sir John Colleton, 1st Baronet
- Henry Woodward (colonist)
- Edward and Arthur Middleton, father and uncle to Arthur Middleton
  - grandfather and great-uncle to Henry Middleton, namesake of Middleton Place
- Sir John Godfrey, son of Richard Godfrey; deputy governor of Carolina, father in law to Henry Woodward
- Robert Gibbes

== See also ==
- Magnolia Plantation and Gardens (Charleston, South Carolina)
- Grand Model for the Province of Carolina
- History of Charleston, South Carolina
- Barbados–United States relations
- Province of Carolina
- History of slavery in South Carolina
- History of slavery in North Carolina
