= John Colleton (disambiguation) =

Sir John Colleton, 1st Baronet was an English Royalist.

John Colleton may also refer to:

- John Colleton (priest) (1548–1635), English Roman Catholic divine
- Several of the Colleton baronets

== See also ==
- Colleton (surname)
