= History of slavery in North Carolina =

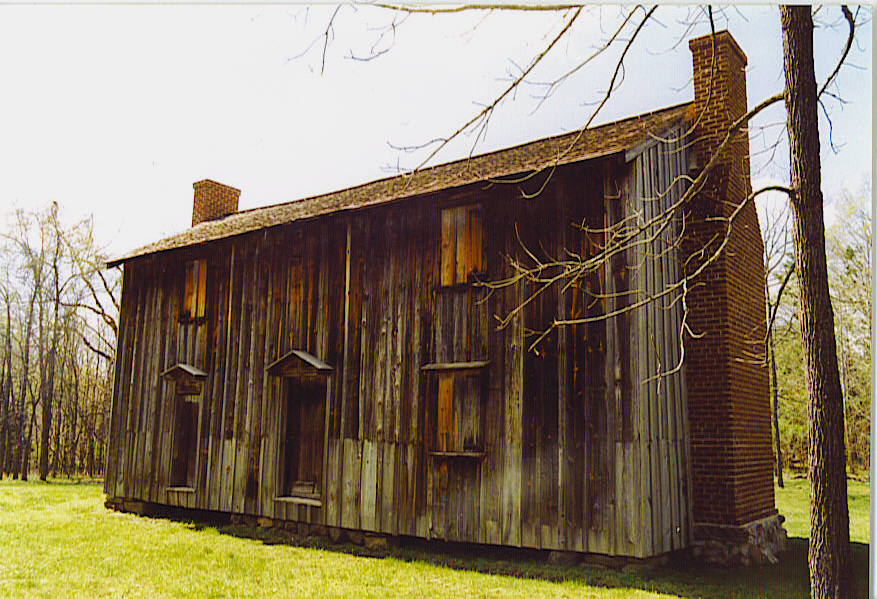
Slave quarters at Horton Grove for the Stagville plantation, built by slaves and occupied until the 1870s

Slavery was legally practiced in the Province of North Carolina and the state of North Carolina until January 1, 1863, when President Abraham Lincoln issued the Emancipation Proclamation. Prior to statehood, there were 41,000 enslaved African Americans in the Province of North Carolina in 1767. By 1860, the number of slaves in the state of North Carolina was 331,059, about one third of the total population of the state. In 1860, there were nineteen counties in North Carolina where the number of slaves was larger than the free white population. During the antebellum period the state of North Carolina passed several laws to protect the rights of slave owners while disenfranchising the rights of slaves. There was a constant fear amongst white slave owners in North Carolina of slave revolts from the time of the American Revolution. Despite their circumstances, some North Carolina slaves and freed slaves distinguished themselves as artisans, soldiers during the Revolution, religious leaders, and writers.

== Growth of the slave population in North Carolina ==
The Lord Proprietors encouraged importing of slaves to the Province of North Carolina by instituting a headright system that gave settlers acreage for the number of slaves that they brought to the province. The geography was a factor that slowed the importation of slaves. Settlers imported slaves from Virginia or South Carolina because of the poor harbors and treacherous coastline. The enslaved black population grew from 800 in 1712 to 6,000 in 1730 and about 41,000 in 1767.

In the early years, the line between white indentured servants and African laborers was vague, as some Africans also arrived under an indenture, before more were transported as slaves. Some Africans were allowed to earn their freedom before slavery became a lifelong racial caste. Most of the free colored families found in North Carolina in the censuses of 1790–1810 were descended from unions or marriages between free white women and enslaved or free African or African-American men in colonial Virginia. Because the mothers were free, their children were born free. Such mixed-race families migrated along with their European-American neighbors into the frontier of North Carolina. As the flow of indentured laborers slackened because of improving economic conditions in Britain, the colony was short on labor and imported more slaves. It followed Virginia in increasing its controls on slavery, which became a racial caste of the foreign Africans.

The economy's growth and prosperity were based on slave labor, devoted first to the production of tobacco. The oppressive and brutal experiences of slaves and poor whites led to their using escape, violent resistance, and theft of food and other goods in order to survive.

Total and Slave Populations in Selected States (1790–1860)
Census Year	1790	1800	1810	1820	1830	1840	1850	1860
All States, Slaves	694,207	887,612	1,130,781	1,529,012	1,987,428	2,482,798	3,200,600	3,950,546
All States, Total Population	3,893,635	5,305,982	7,239,881	9,638,453	12,866,020	17,069,453	23,191,876	31,443,321
North Carolina, Slaves	100,783	133,296	168,824	205,017	245,601	245,817	288,548	331,059
North Carolina, Total Population	393,751	478,103	555,500	638,829	737,987	753,419	869,039	992,622
South Carolina, Slaves	107,094	146,151	196,365	251,783	315,401	327,038	384,984	402,406
South Carolina, Total Population	249,073	345,591	415,115	502,741	581,185	594,398	668,507	703,708
Tennessee, Slaves	–	13,584	44,535	80,107	141,603	183,059	239,459	275,719
Tennessee, Total Population	–	105,602	261,727	422,813	681,904	829,210	1,002,717	1,109,801
Virginia, Slaves	292,627	346,671	392,518	425,153	469,757	449,087	472,528	490,865
Virginia, Total Population	691,737	807,557	877,683	938,261	1,044,054	1,025,227	1,119,348	1,219,630

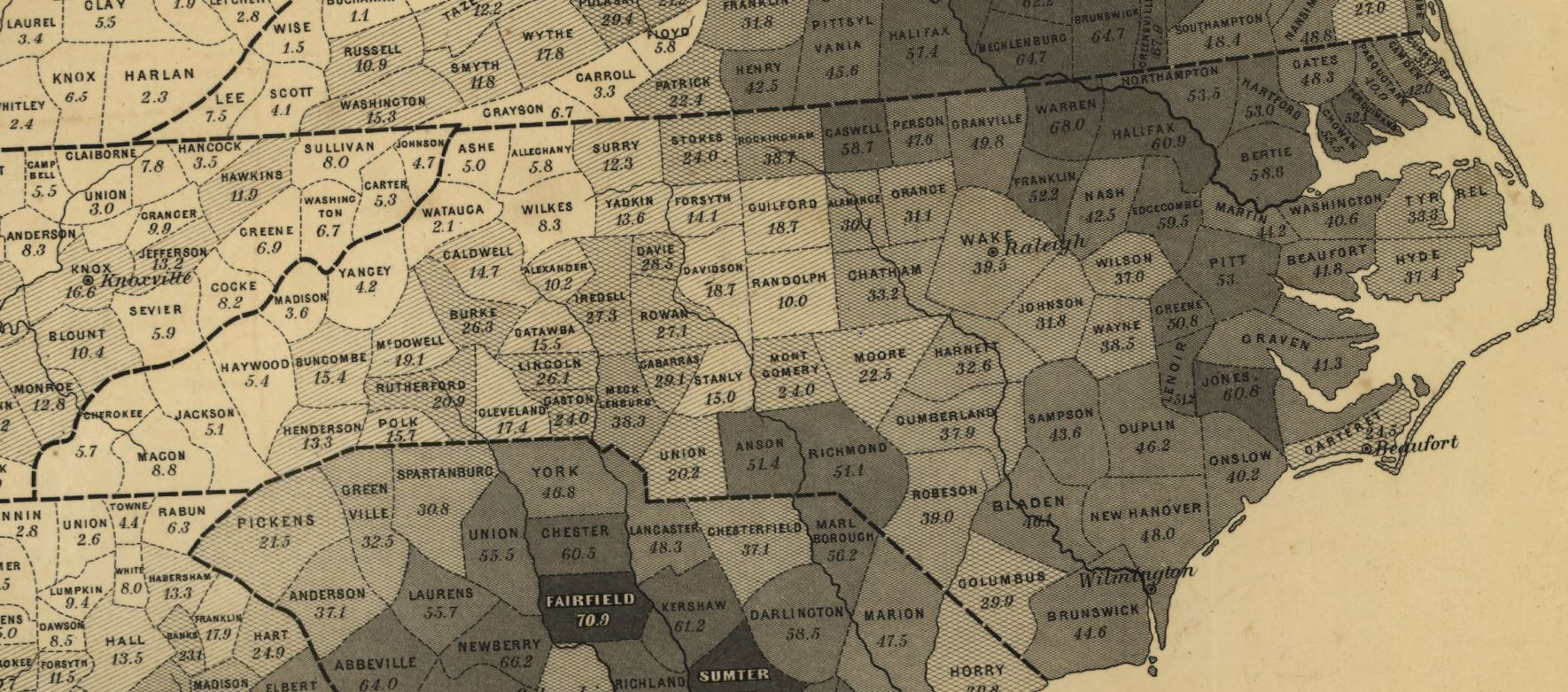
Percent of population that was slave by county in North Carolina in 1860

The number of slaves in North Carolina increased from 100,783 in 1790 to 351,059 in 1860. The percentage of population that was slaves varied by county. There were 19 counties in 1860 where the slave population was greater than the free white population in 1860. These counties were in agricultural areas producing cotton, tobacco, rice and naval stores and where larger plantations and farms existed in the coastal plains, Piedmont, and counties bordering Virginia. There were more slaves in both Virginia and South Carolina in 1860. The Appalachian mountain counties had a lower percentage of slaves. The number of slaves in the western North Carolina counties (Davidson, Washington, Tennessee, Sullivan) that became part of Tennessee in 1796 had relatively few slaves.

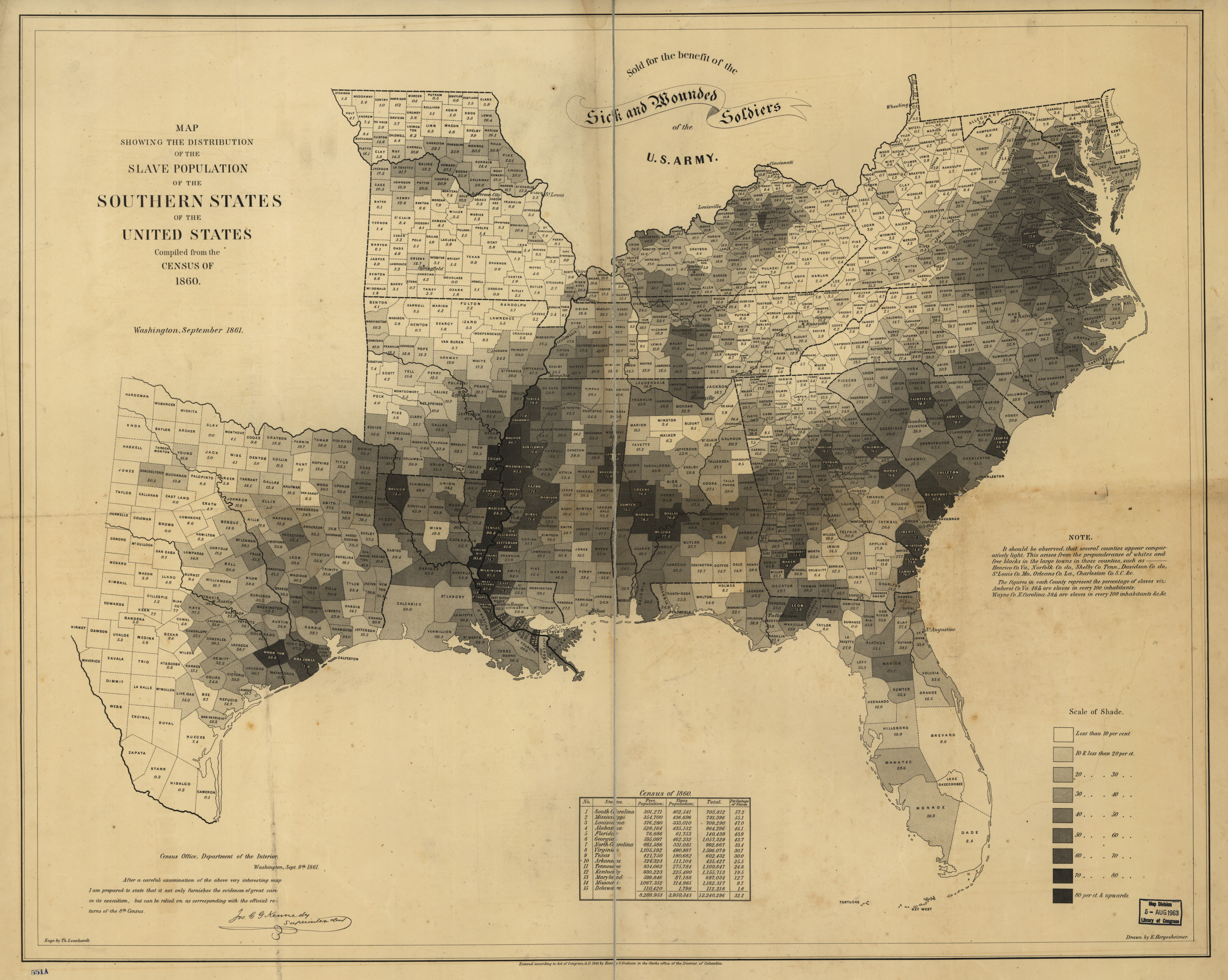
U.S. Slave Population Percentage of Total Population by County in 1860

== Slave owners ==
Enslaved people labored in a variety of roles. Men, women, and children worked variously as domestic servants, skilled artisans, field laborers, and more in urban settings and on both small farms and large plantations. Plantations are often defined as large land holdings that produced cash crops beyond subsistence requirements. Alternatively, some scholars distinguish a plantation from a farm based on the number of people enslaved by the property owner. The number of slaves on a plantation would vary from tens to over one thousand at larger plantations. Early 1900 efforts to document the number of plantations in North Carolina indicate that there were at least 328 plantations in the state.

Slaves were personal property of their owners and could be sold at the discretion of the owner. Slaves were also conveyed in personal wills of the slave master to heirs. Through records of slave auctions and estate records, the value of slaves were recorded. The value of a slave depended on the gender and age with able bodied male slaves, especially skilled artisans, being the highest. The value of a slave was between £60 and £80 at the time of the French and Indian War (1754–1763). The value of a slave increased to about £180 in 1780 and to about $800 in 1840. At the onset of the Civil War, the value of an enslaved male field hand was $1,500 to $1,700; the average value of an enslaved woman ranged from $1,300 to $1,500; an enslaved artisan with specialized skills was valued at as much as $2,000.

== Legal status of enslaved in North Carolina ==
Below is a list of dates of laws and events that were relevant to slaves in North Carolina. The full referencing can be found in the linked articles.

- 1669, Article 10 of the Fundamental Constitutions of Carolina stated, "Every freeman of Carolina shall have absolute power and authority over his negro slaves, of what opinion or religion soever"
- 1739, The Stono Rebellion was a slave rebellion that began on 9 September 1739, in the colony of South Carolina. Due to the proximity to North Carolina, this rebellion caused North Carolina slave owners to restrict their slaves ability to carry guns.
- 1741, a law of the North Carolina General Assembly forbade the manumission of slaves except as a reward for outstanding, or meritorious, service to the colony. County courts could determine this reward and if granted the slave was required to leave the colony within six months.
- 1774, the North Carolina Provincial Congress passed a law, "that we will not import any slave or slaves, or purchase any slave or slaves, imported or brought into this Province by others, from any part of the world."
- 1775–1783, Black men from North Carolina fought for both sides in the American Revolution.
- 1776, the Constitution of North Carolina allowed freed slaves the right to vote
- 1791, The Haitian Revolution was an uprising of slaves in Haiti, which caused North Carolina to restrict the influx of Caribbean slaves
- 1793, The Fugitive Slave Act of 1793 was an act of the U.S. Congress that guaranteed a right for a slaveholder to recover an escaped slave
- 1808, the U.S. Congress passed a law prohibiting the engagement in international slave trade.
- 1816, the North Carolina General Assembly passed an "Act to Dispose of Illegally Imported Slaves". The proceeds of the sale of illegal slaves was paid to the North Carolina Treasury.
- 1816, the North Carolina Manumission Society was formed. It included Quakers and other anti-slavery groups.
- 1819, The Panic of 1819 caused many slave owners to sell their slaves due to worsening economic conditions. Many farmers decided to abandon their farms and head to western states or to Texas Territory to make a new start.
- 1835, the North Carolina Constitution was amended to take away the right of freed slaves to vote
- 1860, the North Carolina General Assembly had a higher percentage (85) of politicians owning slaves than any statehouse in the country.
- 1863, January 1, Emancipation Proclamation, issued by President Abraham Lincoln changed the status of enslaved African Americans from slave to free in North Carolina and other Confederate States of America
- 1865, Slavery abolished by the Thirteenth Amendment to the United States Constitution, excluding convicted criminals. It affects 40,000 remaining slaves.

== Slave religions ==
The religion amongst enslaved people was diverse. Some twenty to thirty percent of slaves that came to America were Muslim. A few had heard of Christianity but many followed traditional African religions.

During the 1700s, most enslaved people held on to their native religions and customs from Africa. However, by the early 1800s, enslaved people were converting to Protestant religions—most notably Baptist and Methodist. Some white churches had balconies where enslaved people were allowed to attend services with their masters. Fear of revolts did not allow enslaved people to organize churches until after the Civil War.

== Notable slaves and freed slaves ==
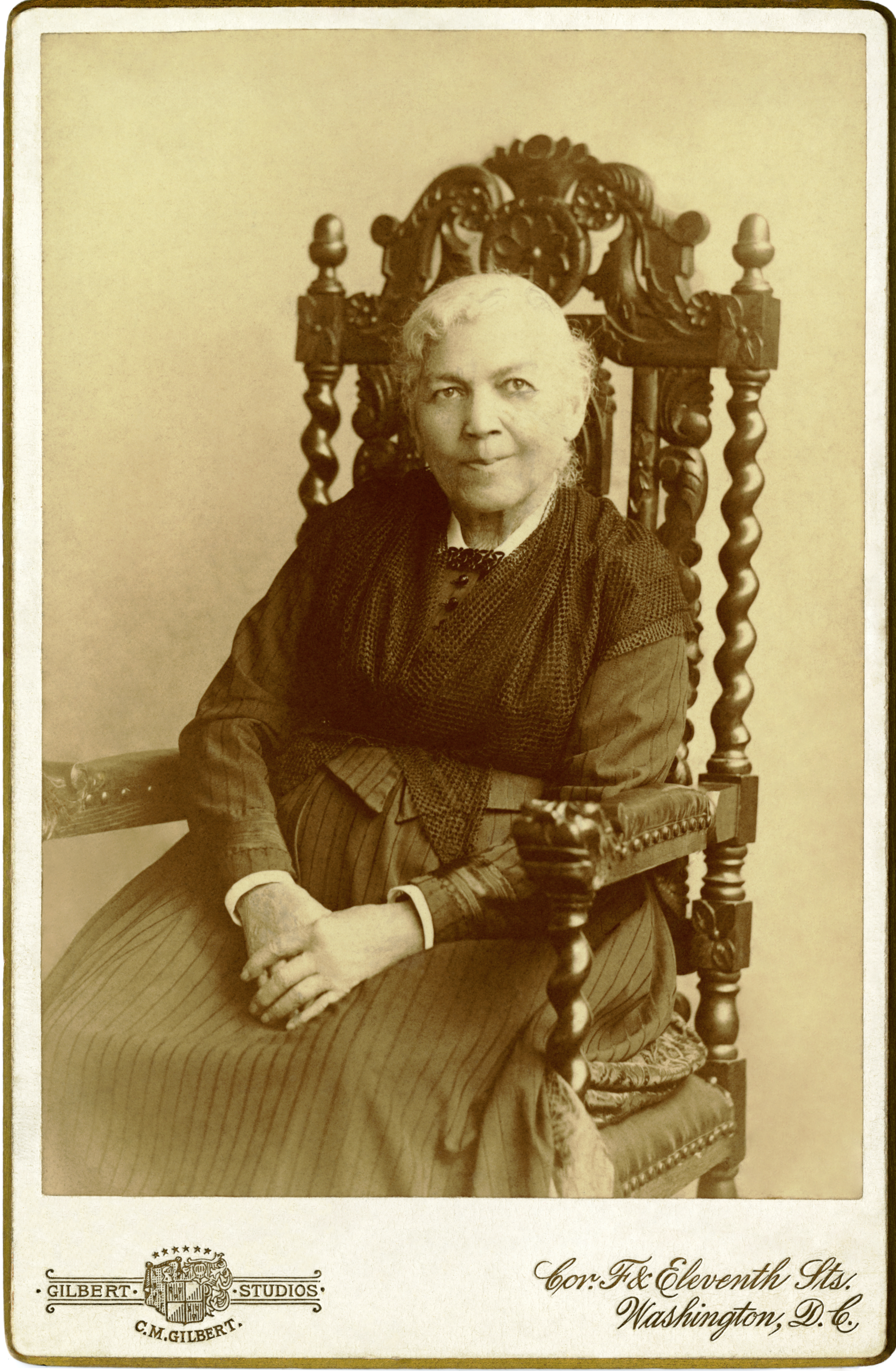
Harriet Jacobs

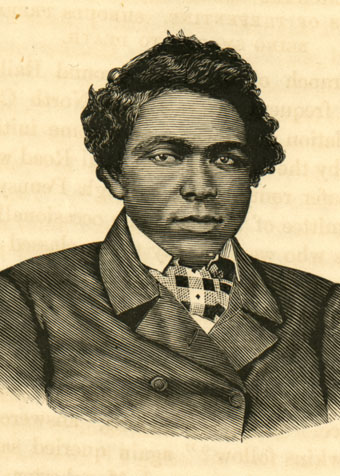
Abraham Galloway

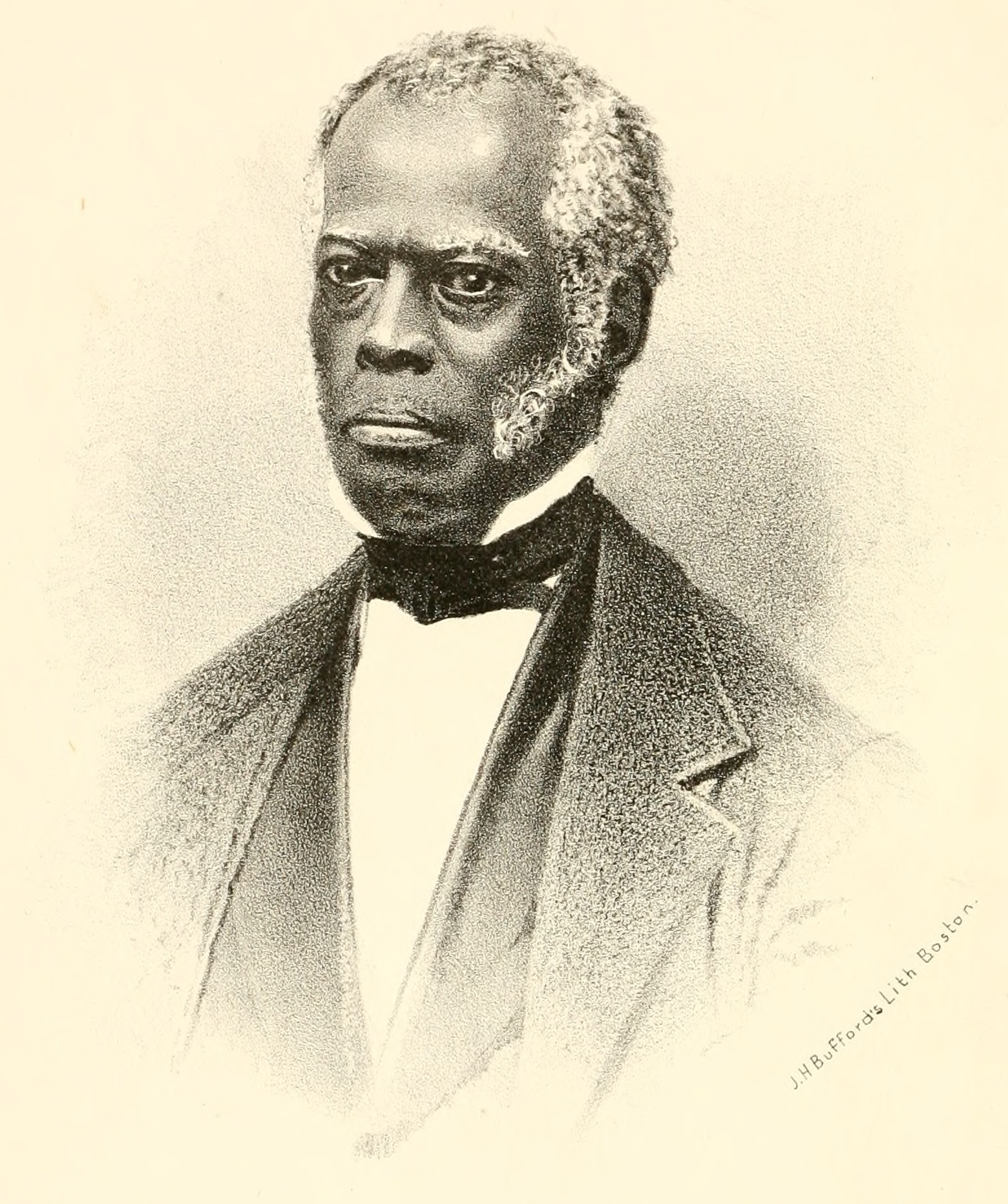
Lunsford Lane

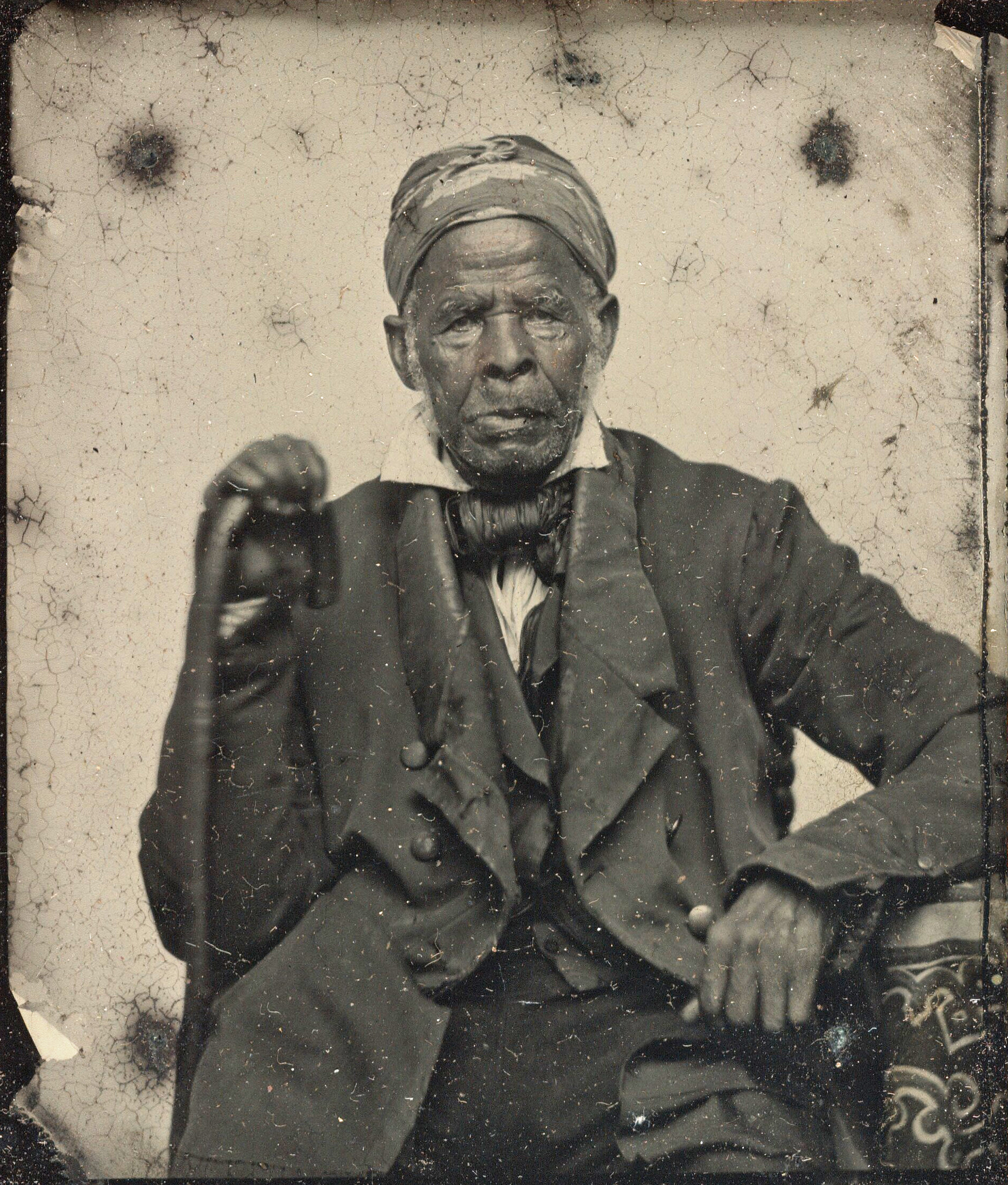
Omar ibn Said

- John Chavis was a free black educator and Presbyterian minister in the American South during the early 19th century. Born in Oxford, North Carolina, he fought for the Continental Army during the American Revolutionary War. He was the first African American to graduate from college. He studied with John Witherspoon at the College of New Jersey and finished his studies at Liberty Hall Academy in Virginia, where he was licensed to preach. Later while working in Raleigh, North Carolina, he established a private school that was highly regarded and attended by both white and black students.)
- Thomas Peters, Enslaved in the Province of North Carolina, Peters emancipated himself and joined British forces during the American Revolutionary War. He served as a Black Loyalist in the Black Company of Pioneers in New York and was evacuated with British forces and many other former slaves at the end of the war. Thomas Peters has been called the "first African-American hero". Like Elijah Johnson and Joseph Jenkins Roberts of Liberia, Peters is considered the African-American founding father of a nation, in this case, Sierra Leone.
- Jonathan Overton was a black soldier from North Carolina who served under George Washington at the Battle of Yorktown.
- Ned Griffin was a slave who served in the American Revolution for his owner William Kitchen. The North Carolina General Assembly freed him and gave him the right to vote, even though William Kitchen had refused.
- Slave James of Perquimans County, North Carolina, served as a sailor on a Continental ship. He was captured twice by the British. After the war, he was freed by the Perquimans county court.
- George Moses Horton, "the black bard of Chapel Hill", was the first North Carolinian, enslaved or free, to publish a book of literature.
- Harriet Jacobs was an African-American writer who escaped from slavery in Edenton, North Carolina, and was later freed. She became an abolitionist speaker and reformer.
- Moses Grandy was an African-American author, abolitionist, and, for more than the first four decades of his life, an enslaved person in Camden County, North Carolina.
- Hannah Bond was an American writer who escaped from slavery in North Carolina about 1857 and went to the North.
- Lunsford Lane was a formerly enslaved African-American entrepreneur from North Carolina who bought freedom for himself and his family. He became a vocal opponent of slavery and wrote a slave narrative autobiography.
- Omar ibn Said was a writer and Islamic scholar, born and educated in what is now Senegal in West Africa, who was enslaved and transported to the United States in 1807. He escaped from a cruel master in Charleston, South Carolina, and journeyed to Fayetteville, North Carolina. There he was recaptured and later sold to James Owen. Sa'id lived into his mid-nineties and was still enslaved at the time of his death in 1864.
- Abraham Galloway was an American escaped slave, abolitionist, mason, spy for the union army, women's suffragist, and state Senator in North Carolina.
- Sara Grudger was an American slave who lived to be 122 years old. She was owned by Joe Grudger until she gained freedom and moved in 1937 to South Asheville, North Carolina, where she died the next year.

== See also ==
- History of North Carolina
- List of plantations in North Carolina
- Slave Quarters
- Slavery in the United States
- African Americans in North Carolina
- Atlantic Creole
- Bristol slave trade
- Coastwise slave trade
- Colonial South and the Chesapeake
- Great Dismal Swamp maroons
- Gullah
- Scramble (slave auction)
- Seasoning (colonialism)
- Slavery in the colonial history of the United States
- Tobacco colonies
- History of slavery in the United States by state
