= Elias Ball =

Colonial South Carolina rice planter and landowner

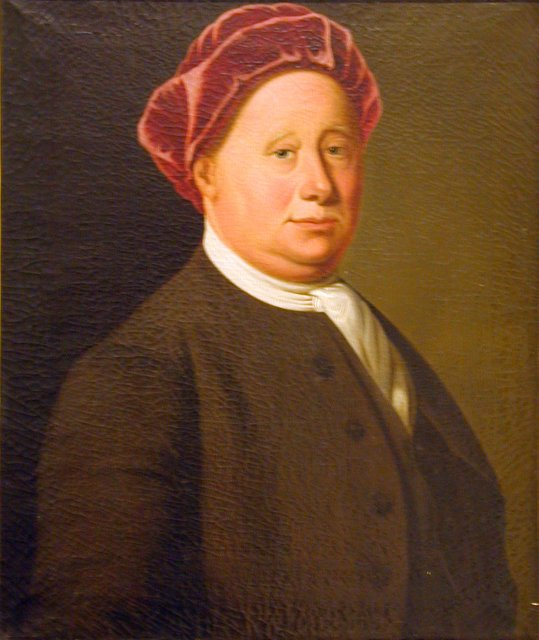
- Portrait of Elias Ball by Jeremiah Theus, Gibbes Museum of Art

Personal details
- Born: 1676 Stokeinteignhead, Devon, England
- Died: September 1751 (aged 74–75) Charleston, South Carolina
- Spouse(s): Elizabeth Harleston, Mary Delamare

Elias "Red Cap" Ball (1676–September 1751) was an English-born migrant who became a wealthy landowner in colonial era Carolina.

== Early life ==
Ball was born in Stokeinteignhead, Devon, England, to William and Mary Ball, tenant farmers with limited property. His early education was rudimentary, though he learned practical skills such as double-entry bookkeeping, which later supported his plantation business in colonial America.

== Emigration to Carolina ==
In 1698, Ball emigrated to the English colony of Carolina (later South Carolina), during a period of expanding settlement and economic opportunity in the region. He inherited land along the Cooper River, where he became a rice planter. His estate, known as Comingtee Plantation, relied heavily on enslaved labor, a common practice in South Carolina's plantation economy at the time.

== Nickname and portrait ==
Ball was known as "Red Cap" due to the red velvet hat he wore in a portrait painted by Jeremiah Theus in the 1740s. The portrait, housed at the Gibbes Museum of Art, depicts him as a well-established plantation owner. His economic success placed him among the influential planters of the Carolina Lowcountry, a region central to the colonial rice trade.

== Military service ==
In 1715, during the Yamasee War, Ball served as a captain in the South Carolina militia. His role involved defending settlements along the Cooper River from attacks by Native American groups reacting to colonial encroachment and economic exploitation.

== Legacy and death ==
Ball amassed substantial wealth, largely through rice cultivation and enslaved labor. His will, written in 1750, detailed extensive landholdings and hundreds of enslaved individuals. He died in September 1751, leaving a legacy that continued through his descendants, who remained prominent figures in South Carolina's plantation society.
