= Colleton (disambiguation) =

Colleton is a county located in the Lowcountry region of the U.S. state of South Carolina.

Colleton may also refer to:

- Colleton, Chulmleigh, England
- Colleton baronets
- James Colleton (died 1706), governor of the English proprietary Province of Carolina
- Sir John Colleton, 1st Baronet (1608–1666), served King Charles I during the English Civil War
- Sara Colleton, American television and film producer
- USS Colleton (APB-36), a Benewah-class barracks ship
