= Slave pass =

Aspect of U.S. slavery

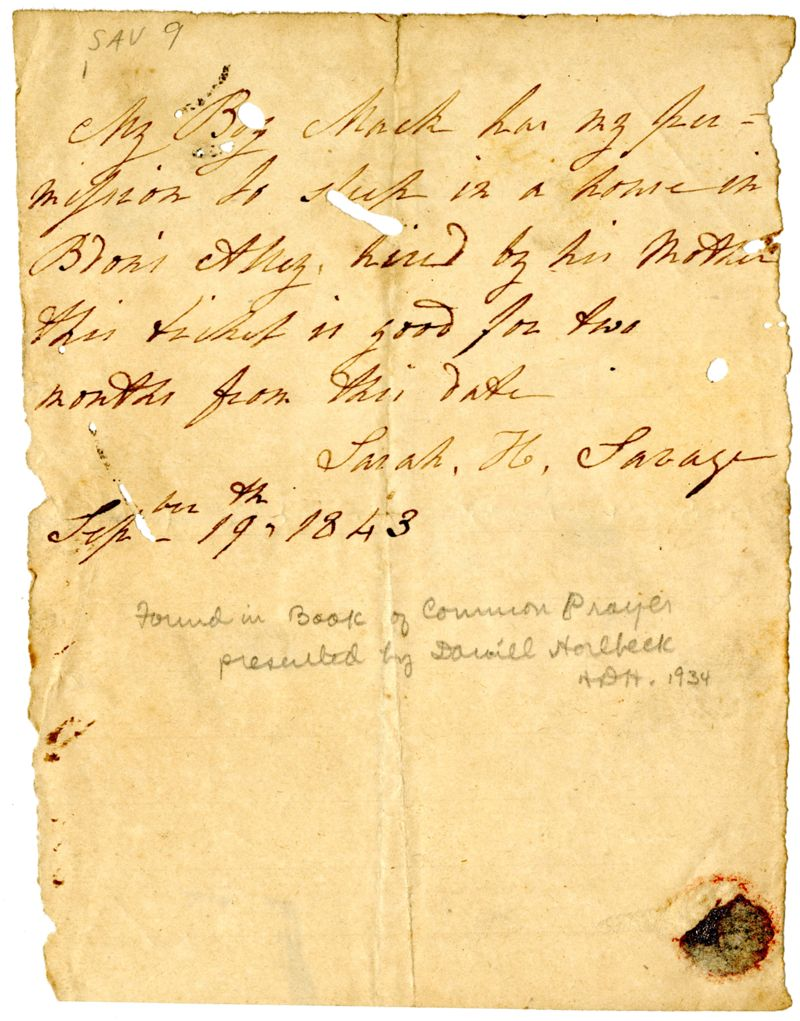
Slave pass written by Sarah H. Savage, dated September 19, 1843, giving permission for an enslaved person named Mack to stay on Bedon's Alley for two months (College of Charleston Libraries)

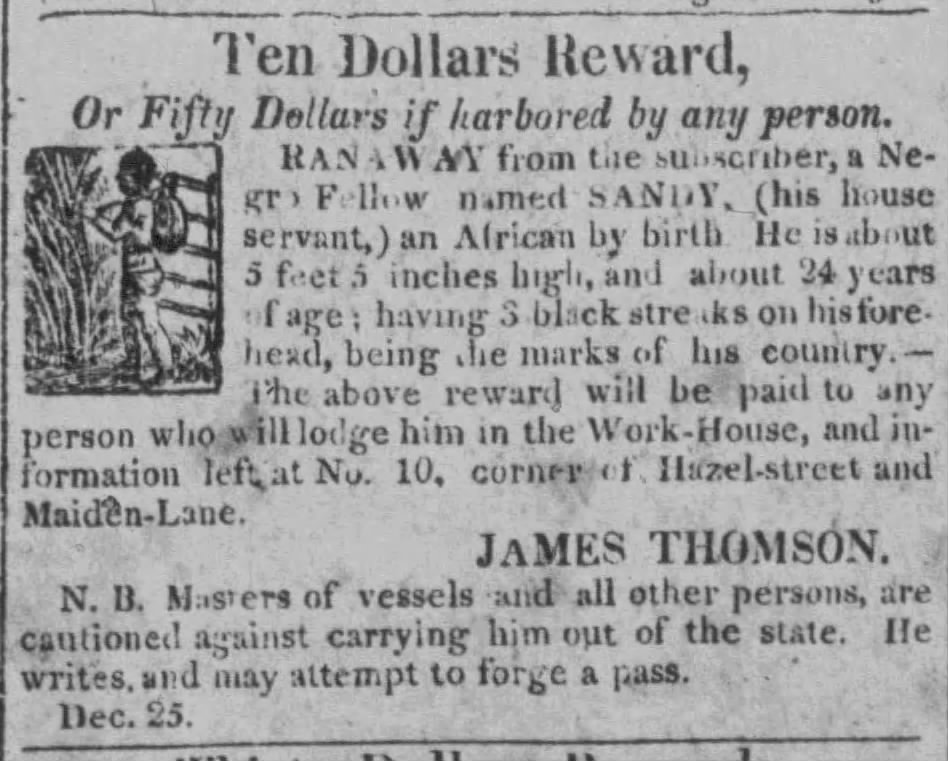
James Thomson placed a runaway slave ad in the newspaper on Christmas Day 1818 informing his fellow Charlestonians that he would pay $10 for the return of "Sandy...an African by birth...having 3 black streaks on his forehead, being the marks of his country...He writes, and may attempt to forge a pass." (Charleston Daily Courier, December 31, 1818)

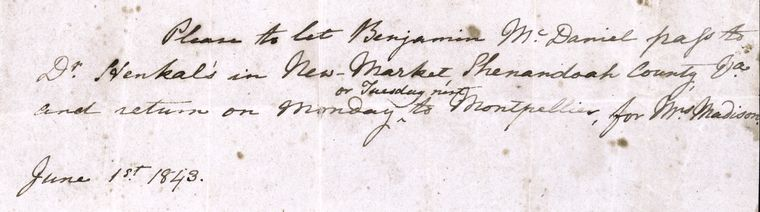
Slave pass for Benjamin McDaniel in Shenandoah County, Virginia, 1843 (Schomburg Collection, NYPL)

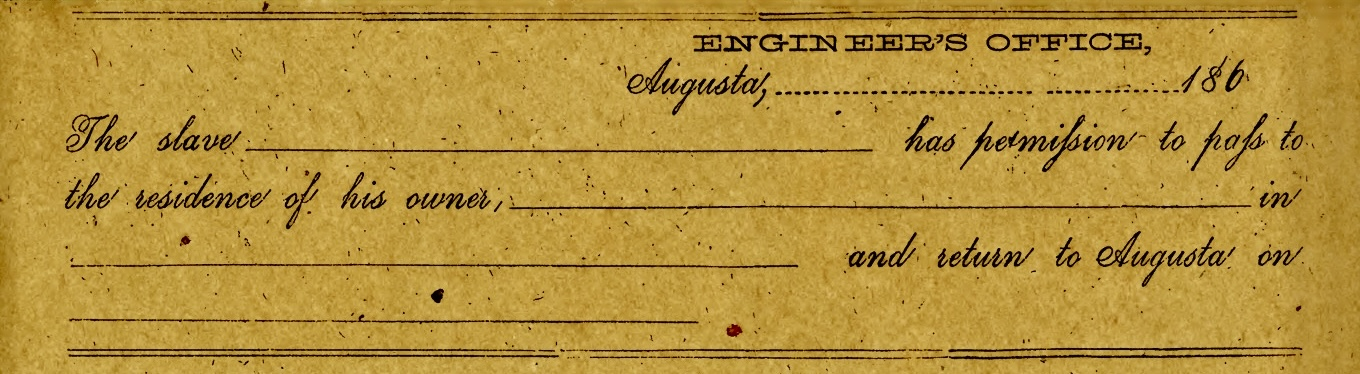
Preprinted blank slave-pass forms from the Lemuel Grant papers at the Atlanta History Center, probably for enslaved people hired to work for the Atlanta and West Point Rail Road

In the history of slavery in the United States, a slave pass was a written document granting permission for an enslaved person to move around without escort by an enslaver.

== Overview ==
A typical slave pass was a handwritten document that listed the names of the enslaved and the enslaver, the destination of the slave, and the duration of time for which they had been released. A slave who had been granted a slave pass had to have it on hand "at all times" and show it, on demand, to any white person who asked to see it. One of the reasons for anti-literacy laws was to prevent slaves from writing their own passes, as described in a Mississippi runaway slave ad of 1814 for Jim, who was described as "talkative and has a good address, but is much marked by the whip, is a great thief, can read and write, may forge a pass as a free man."

== Purpose and social control ==
One of the rationales for anti-literacy laws outlawing the education of slaves was to prevent the enslaved from forging slave passes. According to historian Ryan Quintana, slave passes were a tool of social control:

"...passes importantly extended planter authority and claims of ownership over mobile enslaved bodies, and provided an important differentiation between slaves who had run away from plantations and those simply, and obligingly, beyond the plantation's walls. Slave passes were, in effect, written extensions of planter power. They acknowledged a planter's liability for an enslaved person's actions while outside of the plantation boundaries, and simultaneously maintained the planter's abstract claims of property ownership over enslaved persons' bodies. Tickets, then, transformed slaves into abstracted, embodied extensions of their owners' desires granting them the legal rights to move to and fro and into places that might otherwise have been deemed dangerous. With a ticket, a slave could travel up and down South Carolina's numerous waterways, visit neighboring plantations, and even enter stores and markets to conduct trades for their owners and, some feared, for themselves...given the variety of slaves' activities, both on and off the plantation, passes were necessarily and intentionally vague."

— Quintana, 2018

This vagueness often annoyed slave patrollers, who would have to cede to the limits of the slave pass in order to avoid violating the property rights of slave owners.

== Regulations and penalties ==
An "alleged abolitionist" named Grace was whipped in Vicksburg, Mississippi in 1837 "for encouraging slaves to escape by writing false passes for them."

In 1857, De Bow's Review published a copy of the rules that guided the management of a rice plantation in South Carolina; the document referred to slave passes as tickets and stated:

No one is to be absent from the place without a ticket, which is always to be given to such as ask it, and have behaved well. All persons coming from the Proprietor's other places should show their tickets; to the Overseer, who should sign his name on the back; those going off the plantation should bring back their tickets signed.

In Alabama, the penalties for forging a slave pass were 39 lashes with a whip if the culprit was a free person, and 50 or 100 lashes for an enslaved person, depending on whether it was a first or second offense. In 1853, the Montgomery and West Point Railroad required "negroes traveling alone" to carry two passes, "showing permission of their owners to pass over the road, one of which passes will be retained by the conductor."

The Rev. Calvin Fairbank wrote to William Lloyd Garrison in 1851 after visiting Louisville, saying:

My visit here at this time has taught me a new lesson in slavery. Slaves are all obliged to be at home by 10 o'clock P.M. and if found out after that time without a pass they are taken to the watch-house and whipped.

== Economic impact ==
Granting slave passes could be financially beneficial for enslavers, who could collect unearned income by hiring out their enslaved individuals to other employers. As Moses Grandy explained in his 1844 slave narrative:

He gave me a pass to work for myself; so I obtained work by the piece where I could, and paid him out of my earnings what we had agreed on; I maintained myself on the rest, and saved what I could. In this way I was not liable to be flogged and ill used. He paid seventy, eighty, or ninety dollars a year for me, and I paid him twenty or thirty dollars a year more than that.

Mary Gaffney, interviewed for the WPA Slave Narratives Project, recalled:

back there in Mississippi I'se saw slaves wear bells because they would get a pass and not come home when Maser would tell them to and for being contrary. Them bells was fixes on a brace so'es the slave could not hold the clapper or get them off.

== See also ==
- Freedom of movement under United States law
