= Barbados Servant Code =

Law establishing servitude in the English colony of Barbados

The Barbados Servant Code of 1661 or the Master and Servant Code, officially titled as An Act for good governing of Servants and Ordaining the rights between Master and Servants was a law passed by the Parliament of Barbados to provide a legal basis for servitude in the English colony of Barbados. It was one of a series of acts including the Militia Act, which provided a basis to control indentured servants, often Irish, as well as the enslaved on the Caribbean Island.

== Background ==
By the 1640 and 1660, large numbers of Irish arrived in the Caribbean as servants and penal labours to work in sugar plantations in the aftermath of the Irish Rebellion of 1641 and the Irish Confederate Wars. Prior to the 1661 Act, authorities in Barbados had governed servant and indeed slaves in a piecemeal fashion. Laws from 1652 regulated various details of servants' lives similarly to slaves, like prohibition from trading or being hosted. These laws considered the servants and slaves as akin to animate capital. However they did not quell fears of uprising by disgruntled servants and slaves, risking the sugar trade, leading to the 1661 legal reforms.

== Details ==
The Act, passed in late September has been considered as part of a series of attempt by the legislature to maintain control of 'poor whites', vagabonds and the enslaved. Rights granted to servants are considered to have been much more expansive than in 1652 acts including a prohibition of servitude on children below age 14 without a parish cert listing parental consent. However, it retained harsh rules and enforcement mechanisms. It did prohibit marriage without their masters’ consent, women could not become pregnant, servants could not trade, and masters could not entertain them.

And whereas many Women - servants, are begotten with child by Freemen or Servants, in great prejudice of their respective Masters or mistresses whom they serve, It is therefore ordained and enacted by the President, Council and Assembly, and by the Authority Of the same, That whosoever shall beget a Woman-servant with child, Penalty on the Men. shall, for such offence personally serve the Owner of such Servant three years, or put one in his place for the said time; which is in recompence child be brought upby for the said Master, or Mistress of his and her loss.

The Acts also penalised running away with a ticketing system. The Act was followed by the Barbados Slave Code in the following year.

== See also ==
Barbados Slave Code
