= Fundamental Constitutions of Carolina =

Governing documents 1669, 1682 and 1698

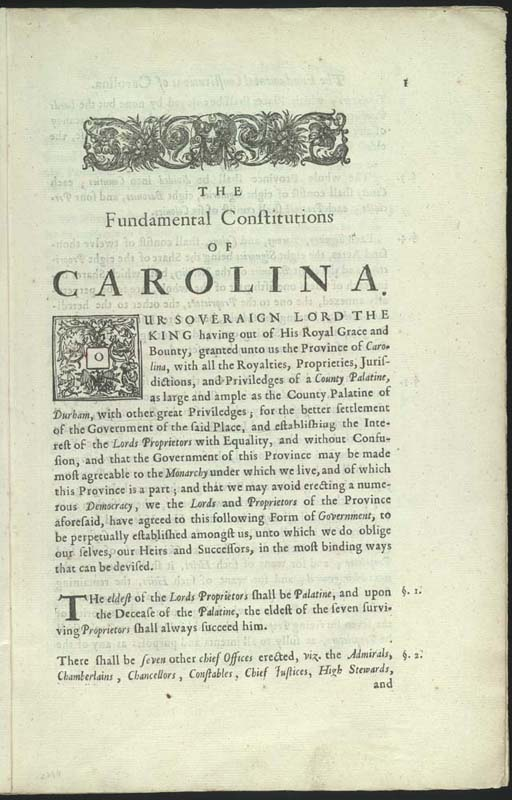
First page of the Fundamental Constitutions of Carolina

The Fundamental Constitutions of Carolina were adopted on 1 March 1669 by the eight Lords Proprietors of the Province of Carolina, which included most of the land between what is now Virginia and Florida. It replaced the Charter of Carolina and the Concessions and Agreements of the Lords Proprietors of the Province of Carolina (1665). The date 1 March 1 1669 was when the proprietors confirmed the Constitutions and sent them to the Colony; later on two other versions were introduced in 1682 during the rule of Charles II and in 1698, following the 1688 Glorious Revolution that ousted the Stuart monarchy. The proprietors suspended the Constitutions in 1690. Despite the claims of proprietors on the valid version of the Constitution, the colonists officially recognized the 21 July 1669 version, claiming that six proprietors had sealed the Constitutions as "the unalterable form and rule of Government forever" on that date. The earliest draft of this version in manuscript is believed to be the one found at Columbia, South Carolina archives.

The Constitutions were "reactionary" and "experimented with a non-common law system designed to encourage a feudal social structure", including through the use of non-unanimous jury decisions for criminal convictions. The Constitutions also entrenched slavery in the colony's founding law: Article 110 provided that "every freeman of Carolina shall have absolute power and authority over his negro slaves, of what opinion or religion soever", and Article 107 that baptism did not alter a master's dominion, making Carolina the first English colony whose constitution explicitly sanctioned chattel slavery. Some scholars think that the Colonists, settlers, and the British Crown kept themselves at a distance to the Constitutions from the beginning; however, others argue that it was a legal document that drew on the Stuart king's earlier charter to the colony and reflected crucial legal realities. While the provisions of the Fundamental Constitutions were never fully employed nor ratified, the document did help to shape power in the Carolinas and especially land distribution. Colonists' main concerns over the document were its exaltation of proprietors as noblemen at the apex of the hierarchically designed society. Second, the Constitutions had rules that were hard to implement by settlers for practical reasons. Thus, the proprietors had to amend the rules five times. They were repealed in part after the 1688 revolution against James II—the Glorious Revolution, which also reflected a partial reaction against such principles; however, for eight proprietors and the king who were the authors of the "Fundamental Constitutions", it reflected the proper order of governance, or as they wrote, they were creating a government with lords so "that the government of this province may be made most agreeable to the monarchy under which we live and of which this province is a part; and that we may avoid erecting a numerous democracy." The eight Lords Proprietors were Duke of Albemarle (1608–1670); Earl of Clarendon (1609–1674); Baron Berkeley of Stratton (1602–1678); Earl of Craven (1608–1697); Sir George Carteret (c. 1610–1680); Sir William Berkeley (1605–1677); Sir John Colleton (1608–1666); and Earl of Shaftesbury (1621–1683). Shaftesbury's secretary John Locke was involved in the drafting of the Constitutions for his patron and the other Lords Proprietors.

== Authorship ==
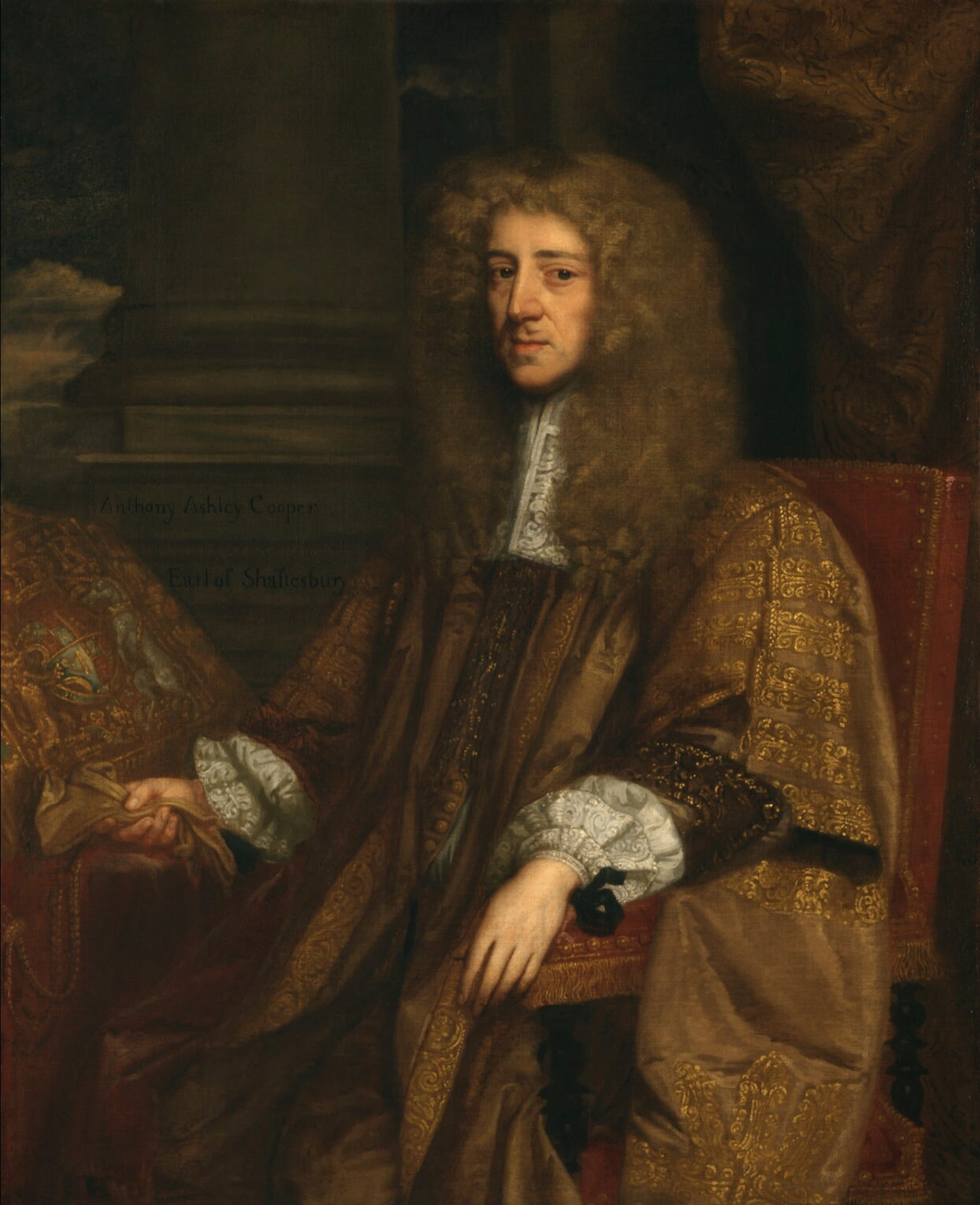
1st Earl of Shaftesbury, one of the Lords Proprietors of North Carolina

Because the Fundamental Constitutions were drafted during John Locke's service to one of the Province of Carolina proprietors, Anthony Ashley Cooper, 1st Earl of Shaftesbury, it is widely alleged that Locke had a major role in the making of the Constitutions. In the view of historian David Armitage and political scientist Vicki Hsueh, the Constitutions were co-authored by Locke and his patron Cooper, the 1st Earl of Shaftesbury. It was a legal document, written for and signed and sealed by the eight Lord proprietors to whom Charles II had granted the colony. According to Locke biographer Roger Woolhouse, Locke's patron Ashley, "as the most proactive of the proprietors must bear responsibility for shaping and drawing up the Constitutions" and notes that "whatever [Locke's] involvement in the composition of the Constitutions, [he] did not seem to have a close attachment to it." Historian Holly Brewer argues that Locke was functioning as a paid secretary and wrote the Fundamental Constitutions much as a lawyer drafts a will for a client. At the end of his life, Locke acknowledged himself as author of works published anonymously, but the Constitutions is not among them.

== Main features ==
The Constitutions introduced certain safeguards for groups seeking refuge for religious reasons. To that end, Article 97 of the document foresaw: "...the natives who...are utterly strangers to Christianity, whose idolatry, ignorance, or mistake gives us no right to expel or use them ill; and those who remove from other parts to plant there will unavoidably be of different opinions concerning matters of religion, the liberty whereof they will expect to have allowed them...and also that Jews, heathens, and other dissenters from the purity of Christian religion may not be scared and kept at a distance from it...therefore, any seven or more persons agreeing in any religion, shall constitute a church or profession, to which they shall give some name, to distinguish it from others." Accordingly, the Constitutions gave the right to worship and the right to constitute a church to religious dissenters to Christianity and outsiders such as Jews. They also promised religious tolerance towards idolatrous Native Americans and heathens. The level of religious tolerance portrayed in the Constitutions was noted by Voltaire, who clearly believed Locke had a fundamental role in their drafting: "Cast your eyes over the other hemisphere, behold Carolina, of which the wise Locke was the legislator."

The Constitutions also had less liberal and more aristocratic elements in it compared to the egalitarian, democratic and liberal standard of John Locke's much more famous, Two Treatises of Government, published only after he returned from political exile in the Dutch Republic. The Fundamental Constitutions promoted both aristocracy and slavery in North America. The notorious article 110 of the Constitutions states that "Every freeman of Carolina shall have absolute power and authority over his negro slaves, of what opinion or religion soever." Pursuant to this provision slaveholders were granted absolute power of life and death over their slaves. Additionally, the Fundamental Constitutions held that being a Christian does not alter the civil dominion of a master over his slaves. (Article 107) Brewer argues that Locke's early involvement in the Fundamental Constitutions is evidence of his cooperation with Charles II's plans to promote slavery and hierarchy in the English overseas colonies, but that in fact Locke's later writings show how his ideas formed in reaction to the societal vision propounded by the Fundamental Constitutions and other efforts of Charles II and his Privy Council to promote both hierarchy and slavery across the empire.

Apart from slavery, the erection of hereditary nobility and recognition of noble titles raised controversies. Because Charles II's original charter to the eight proprietors for Carolina prevented the proprietors from granting titles already in use in England, such as Earl or Baron, they created two new titles, cassique and landgrave, that would be passed down from father to son. Those nobles were granted privileges such as being tried only in Chief Justice's Court and being found guilty by a jury of their peers. (Article 27) The Constitutions introduced also a hereditary serfdom system, the members of which were called "leetmen", in addition to slavery. Like the black slaves, the leetmen and leetwomen were under command and jurisdiction of noblemen to whom they serve. (Article 22)

Through the Constitutions, the Lords Proprietor and the noblemen owned two-fifths of the Colony's vast lands. By the same token, the freemen had the right to property for the rest of the land, and any among them who owned more than fifty acres had right to vote, and any who had more than five-hundred acres of land had the right to be a member of Parliament. (Article 72) This requirement of land ownership has been considered as relatively favorable to the freemen in comparison to that of England.

Elections were to be held by secret ballot, which was not yet common practice in England. Laws were to expire automatically after one hundred years, thus preventing outdated regulations from remaining on the books.

== See also ==
- Grand Model for the Province of Carolina
