= James Colleton (died 1790) =

James Edward Colleton (c. 1709–1790) was a Member of Parliament for Lostwithiel in Cornwall. He was a great-grandson of Sir John Colleton, 1st Baronet (1608–1666). He married Lady Anne Cowper, a daughter of William Cowper, 1st Earl Cowper.
