= Lunsford Lane =

African-American slave and entrepreneur (1803–1879)

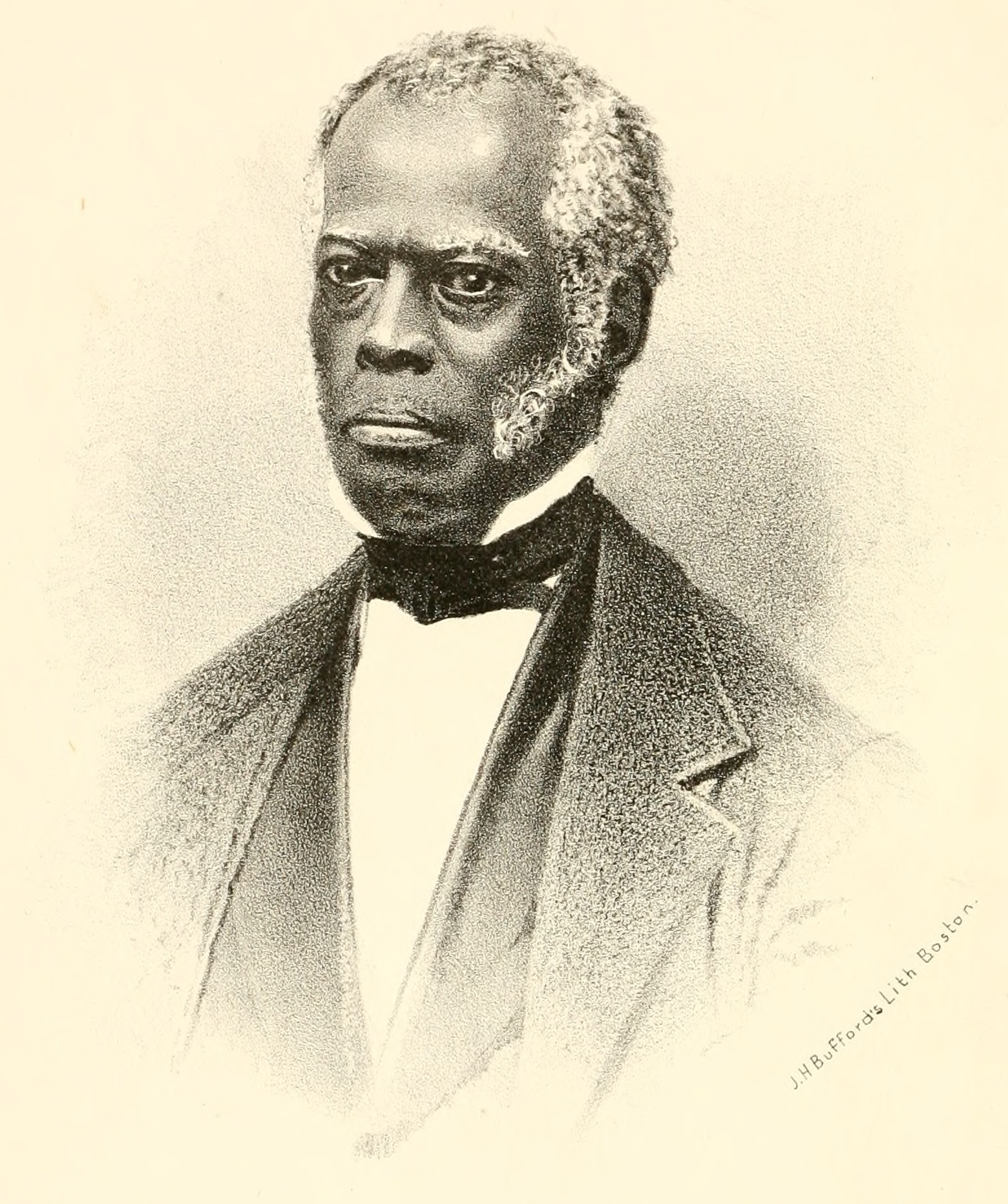
Lunsford Lane, lithograph in Hawkins' biography.

Lunsford Lane (May 30, 1803 – June 27, 1879) was an entrepreneur tobacconist from North Carolina who bought freedom for himself and his family. He became a vocal abolitionist and wrote a slave narrative autobiography. His life and narrative shows the plight of slavery, even for the relatively privileged slaves.

== Life ==
Lane was born near Raleigh, North Carolina. His parents, Edward and Clarissa Lane, were enslaved house servants (commonly called "house slaves") in the family of Sherwood Haywood in Raleigh. The surname Lane came from their original owners. The only child, Lunsford Lane also became a servant at the family. This gave him far more opportunities than were available to enslaved field workers (then called "field slaves"), but he still dreamt of freedom.

He earned his first money by selling a basket of peaches his father had given him. This was the start of a varied entrepreneurial career. Lane sold marbles and saved money he was given by guests visiting the house. From his father he had learnt to prepare smoking tobacco. Lane improved on it, and made a tobacco with an especially sweet and pleasant taste. He made it by night when he was free from the house work. He also made a pipe with reeds, a hot wire and clay, which he sold in the early part of the night, and produced in the latter. Many of the local legislators became his customers, and he was able to expand his business and have others sell the products on commission. He became known as a tobacconist while doing his work as a house slave in daytime. He also sold firewood, worked as a handyman and as a messenger in governor Edward B. Dudley's office.

Sherwood Haywood died and his widow had to rent out Lane. This was lucky for him, since he was able to rent himself for about $100 to $120 per year. Eventually he had saved enough money to purchase his own freedom for $1000. He married Martha Curtis in May 1828, and they had seven children. He would spend another 18 years purchasing his family. He was still legally a slave in North Carolina since the law required a slave to have done "meritorious service" to become a free man. Lane instead traveled with a friend to New York in 1835, where he was granted freedom.

Five years later, in 1840, he was notified that since he got his freedom in New York, he violated a state law forbidding free blacks from other states from staying in North Carolina for more than 20 days. He petitioned for an exception, but was forced to leave the next year. Forbidden from living in his home town, he moved to New York and Boston in the north. There he earned money to free his family by speaking at abolitionist meetings.

In Baltimore, Lane and a companion were arrested when a slave trader claimed they were runaways. Despite having their free papers and other documentation it went to trial. They were freed after the trader refused to show documents of the runaways, and a passionate speech by the young lawyer who defended Lane and his companion. Kidnappings of free blacks and falsely claiming free people as fugitive slaves was common at the time.

In 1842 he returned to Raleigh to buy the rest of his family. Despite prior assurances, he was arrested for delivering abolitionist lectures in the North. He was released, but taken by a mob to the gallows in the wood and tarred and feathered. His local white friends rescued him and helped him escape on a train with his family. He was also given his mother by Mrs. Haywood. They settled in Philadelphia, later joined by his father.

Soon after arriving in Philadelphia, the Lanes moved to Massachusetts, settling first in Boston and then in 1845, moving to Cambridge where his youngest daughter was born. Census records and Cambridge city directories during that period list a number of occupations for Lane including book agent, physician and manufacturer of patent medicines. In 1863 Lane was working as a steward at Wellington's Hospital in Worcester, Massachusetts

In 1855, poet Henry Wadsworth Longfellow welcomed him into his home Craigie House in Cambridge, Massachusetts as a guest.

After the death of his youngest daughter in April 1872, Lunsford Lane moved to Greenwich Village in New York City; he died sometime during the month of June 1879 in a multi-family tenement at 15 Cornelia Street in the West Village of dropsy and old age. Shortly before his death he helped found a school in New Bern, North Carolina.

In 2019, a historical marker honoring him was erected on Edenton Street in Raleigh.

== The Narrative of Lunsford Lane ==
In 1842 Lane published The Narrative of Lunsford Lane, Formerly of Raleigh, N.C. Embracing an Account of His Early Life, the Redemption by Purchase of Himself and Family from Slavery, and His Banishment from the Place of His Birth for the Crime of Wearing a Colored Skin.

It was well received and was reprinted three times in six years.

== Biographies ==
Much of what is known about Lunsford Lane comes from his own narrative above and the contemporary biography by William George Hawkins: Lunsford Lane; or, Another Helper from North Carolina. He is also given a chapter in John Spencer Bassett's Anti-Slavery Leaders of North Carolina of 1898.

== See also ==
- Moses Grandy
- List of slaves
