= Cassique =

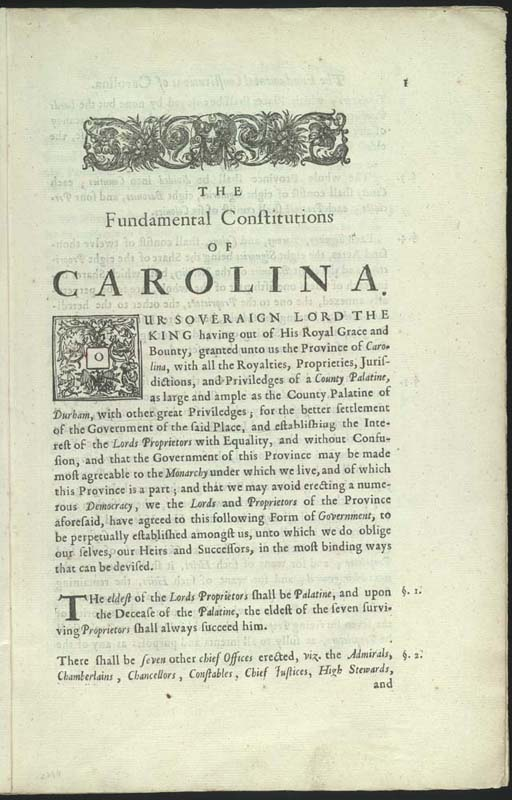
First page of the Fundamental Constitutions of Carolina

Cassiques (junior) (also spelled cazique or casique) and landgraves (senior) were intended to be a fresh new system of titles of specifically English lesser nobility in America, created for hereditary representatives in a proposed upper house of a bicameral Carolina assembly.

== Carolina Assembly ==
They were proposed in the late 17th century and set out in the Fundamental Constitutions of Carolina. The Fundamental Constitutions were never ratified by the assembly, and were largely abandoned by 1700.

The upper house, consisting of the Landgraves and Casiques..are..a middle state between Lords and Commons. (1702)
They are there by Patent, under the Great Seal of the Provinces, call'd Landgraves and Cassocks, in lieu of Earls and Lords. (1707)

Cacique, a native chief or ‘prince’ of the aborigines in the West Indies and adjacent parts of America. (1555)

== Native American leaders ==
The title Cassique was bestowed upon the Chief (Chieftain) or leader of the Native American tribes (mainly the Kiawah Indians) which originally settled the low-country of South Carolina, (Note: The South Carolina term lowlands or low country would, in the state of Virginia, be called tidewater) near modern day Charleston, South Carolina. The Kiawah Indians referred to the area where the peninsula of the city of Charleston, SC located between the modern day Ashley River (then known as the Kiawah River) and the Cooper River (called the Wando River) as "Chicora". The Cassique of Kiawah, who had traded with the Cape Fear Barbadian colony and sent his nephew as an emissary to England with explorer Captain Robert Sandford in 1666, was a friend to the English and urged the English to settle the area known as "Chicora". The Cassique's motivating factors were both financial and the Intrinsic motivation of Tranquility as the Kiawah Indians would gain an established trading partner with the English as well as protection from the Spanish in Florida and the neighboring Westoe tribe who were known cannibals and had attacked the Kiawah Indians on several occasions.

The Cassique and his Kiawah tribes were quite persuasive and the English established the settlement Charles Towne, named for the Lord Proprietors' benefactor King Charles II of England, on the West bank of the Ashley (Kiawah) River at Albemarle Point in 1670. Thus, the Kiawah Indians became comrades with the English as perhaps was predetermined when the Kiawah originally greeted the colonists upon arrival at Bull's Bay with the phrase "Bony Conraro Angles!" (meaning "Good English Comrades") in poorly spoken Spanish.

== Identified landgraves, landgravines and cassiques ==
This is a list of identified South Carolina landgraves, landgravines (female version) and cassiques (female term unknown). Their "baronies" often had Native American names. Seemingly, only about half of this colonial South Carolina nobility ever reached its soil. One man was both Cassique and Landgrave. In some cases, the title seems to have been inherited.

- Gov. John Archdale, Landgrave, Created 1694
- Christopher Arthur, Esq., Landgrave/Cassique? (Created c1724, of "Cypress" Barony)
- John Ashby, Esq., Cassique, "Quenby" (aka "Yadhaw"), Created 1682
- John Ashby, Jr., Esq., Cassique?, Inherited? after 1699
- John Ashby, III, Esq., Cassique?, Inherited? c1716 (d1729)
- Hon. Daniel Axtell, Sr., Landgrave, Created 1681
- Hon. Holland Axtell, Landgrave, Created 1692
- Lady Rebecca Pratt Axtel, Landgravine? (Of "Newington" Barony)
- John Bailey, Esq., Landgrave, Created 1682 (Of "Otter Island" Barony)
- John Bayley, Esq., Landgrave/Cassique? (16,200a "Hilton Head Island" Barony?)
- Sir Edmund Bellinger, Sr., Landgrave, Created 1698 (Of "Tombodly" & "Ashepoo" Baronies)
- Edmund Bellinger, Jr., Esq., Landgrave, Inherited c1705
- Sir Edmund Bellinger, III, Landgrave, Inherited c1739
- Edmund Bellinger, IV, Esq., Landgrave, Inherited? c1772
- Edmund Cussings Bellinger, Esq., (1813–1848) Inherited?, Landgrave?, of "Poca Sabo" Barony?
- Joseph Bellinger, Esq., Landgrave, Inherited? c1773, of "Aeolian Lawn" Barony?
- Thomas Bellinger, Esq., Landgrave, Inherited
- Col. Edward Berkerley (Fictional), Cassique, "Created" c1684 (Of [Fictional] "Kiawah" Barony)
- Gov. Daniel Blake, Landgrave?, Inherited c1751
- Gov. & Gen. Joseph Blake, Sr., Landgrave, Created 1696 ("Plainfield" Barony)
- Col. Joseph Blake, Jr., Landgrave, Inherited c1700
- Capt. James Carteret R.N., Landgrave, Created 1670
- John Carteret, Jr., Earl Granville, Landgrave?, Inherited? c1718, of "Hobcaw" Barony)
- Hon. John (Carteret?), Landgrave, Created c1718 (of "Hobcaw" Barony)
- Gov. James Colleton, Landgrave, Created 1670/71 (Of "Fairlawn" Barony), "Wadboo" Barony?, Devil's Elbow Barony?
- Hon. Peter Colleton, Landgrave, of "Fairlawn" Barony
- Hon. Thomas Colleton, Sr., Landgrave, Created 1681 (Of "Cypres" Barony)
- Sir William Craven, Sr., Landgrave & Cassique
- Lawrence Crump, Esq., Landgrave?
- Deputy Gov. Robert Daniell, Landgrave, Created c1711 (Of "Winyah" Barony)
- Dr. Christopher Dominick, Cassique
- Gov. Charles Eden, Langrave, Created 1718 and last Landgrave created
- John Ely, Esq., Landgrave?
- John Ffoster, Esq., Cassiqie, Created c1677/78
- John Gibbs, Esq., Cassique, Created 1682
- Hon. James Griffths, Landgrave, Created 1707 (Of "Port Royal" Barony)
- Hon. ???? Griffiths, Landgrave, Inherited After 1707 (Father of James Griffiths)
- Hon. William Hodgson, Landgrave & Cassique, Created c1714-1717?
- Col. Samuel Horsey/Horseley, Landgrave
- Lady Mary Ketelby Johnston, Landgravine?, Inherited
- Gov. Robert Johnston, Landgrave?
- Gov. Sir Nathaniel Johnson, Landgrave & Cassique, Created 1686, of "Silk Hope" Barony
- Edward Jewkes, Esq., Landgrave
- Hon. Abel Ketelby, Sr., Landgrave, Created 1708/09
- Gov. Sir Richard Kyrle, Landgrave, Created 1684
- John Locke, Landgrave, Created 1671
- Thomas Lowndes?, Esq., Landgrave or Cassique?, c1728
- Gov. Philip Ludwell, Cassique
- John Monke, Esq., Cassique, Created 1682/83
- James Moore, Landgrave of "Yeshoe" Barony, "Boo-craw-ee" Barony, and "Wapensaw" Barony
- Gov. Joseph Morre, Landgrave
- Hon. Joseph Morton, I, Landgrave, Created 1681
- Hon. Joseph Morton, II, Landgrave
- Joseph Pendarvis, Esq., Landgrave? (Often incorrectly designated Landgrave)
- Col. Andrew Percival, Landgrave?, Created c1677
- Spencer Percival, Esq., Landgrave?
- Gov. John Price, Landgrave
- Maj. Thomas Rowe, Cassique, Created 1682
- Lady Statira Elizabeth Farquarson Johnston Rundell, Landgravine? (Inherited?)
- Henry Smith, Esq., Landgrave, Inherited
- John Smith, Esq., Cassique, Created 1682 ("Boo-shoo" Barony)
- Col. Joseph Smith, Landgrave, Inherited ("Wiskinboo" Barony)
- Gov. Thomas Smith, Jr., Cassique, Created 1691, Landgrave, Created 1693 (Smith's barony may have included Smith's/Bald Head Island, N.C.)
- Hon. Thomas Smith, III, Landgrave, Created 1689, of "Whiskinboo" Barony
- Gov. Seth Sothell/Southwell, Landgrave (title "Suspended")
- Hon. Joseph West, Landgrave, Created 1684
- Capt. Henry Wilkinson, Cassique, Created 1681
- Edward Willimot, Esq., Landgrave (title "Suspended")
- Lady Elizabeth Bellinger Wright, Landgravine?, Inherited
- Sir John Wyche, Landgrave, Created Prior to 1701, "Poco Sabo" Barony
- Gov. Sir John Yeamans, Baronet, Landgrave, Created 1671
