= Carolana =

Early United States province

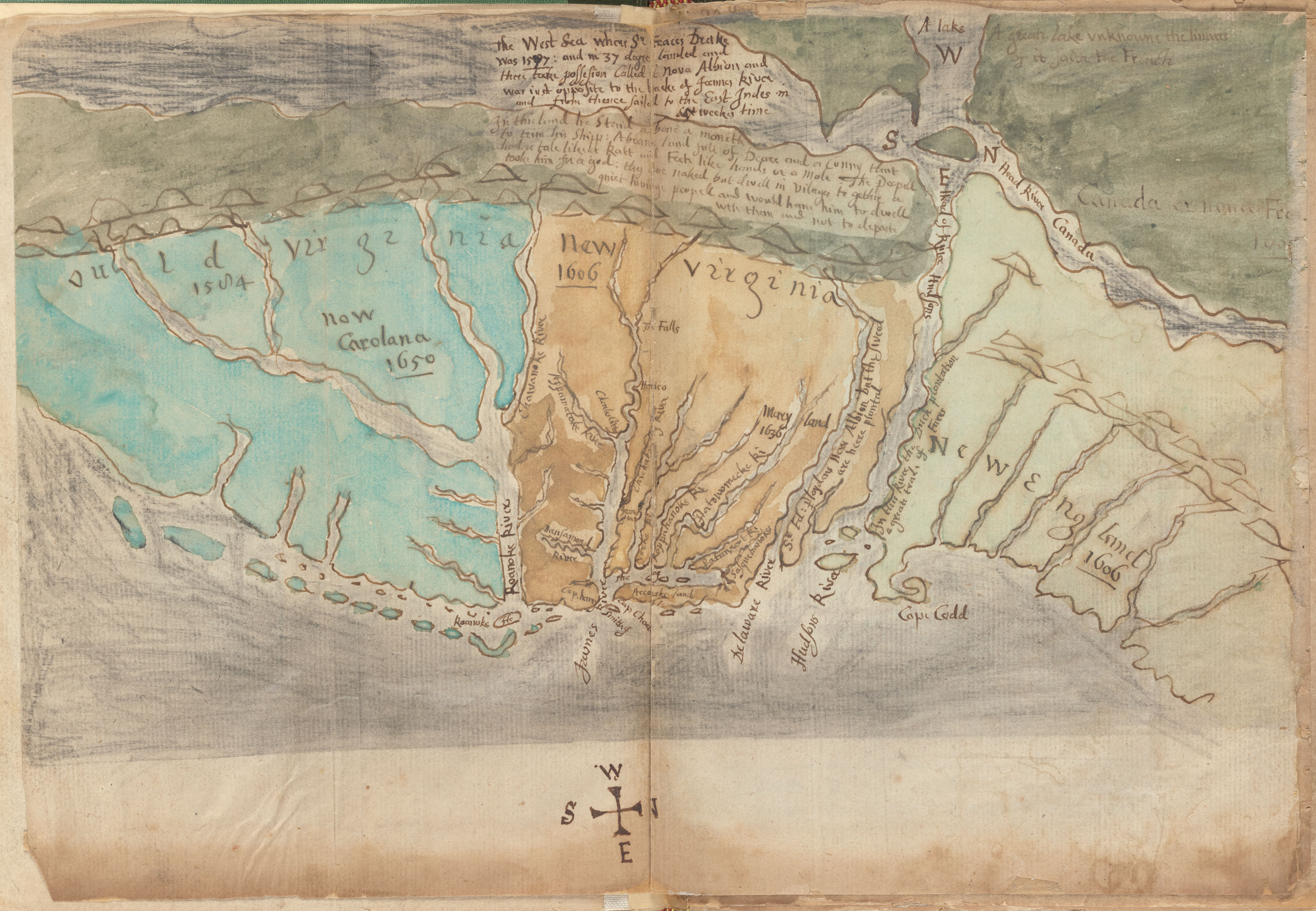
John Ferrar's map of Virginia, 1650.

The early province of Carolana was the land forming the southern English colonies, spanning from 31° to 36° north latitude. In 1629, King Charles I of England granted the territory to his attorney general Sir Robert Heath. The original charter claimed the land from Albemarle Sound in present-day North Carolina, to the St. Johns River in the south, just miles below the current Florida-Georgia state line. The region as a whole comprised all or parts of the modern-day states of Louisiana, Mississippi, Alabama, Florida, Georgia, South Carolina and North Carolina. Charles I named the colony for himself, the name Carolana being derived from Carolus, the Latin form of Charles.

== History ==
The land of Carolana was granted to attorney general Sir Robert Heath by King Charles I in 1629. Then in 1698, Daniel Coxe acquired the title from Heath; under it he claimed the region in the rear of the Carolina settlements and including the lower Mississippi Valley. There are only two references to Carolana found on modern-day maps, the first was found on the 1651 "Mapp of Virginia" published by John Farrer. The second reference is "A Map of Carolana and the River Meschacebe" published by Colonel Daniel Coxe Jr.

=== Heath patent ===
Heath was attorney general under King Charles I, and in 1629 the king granted Heath with a patent and title to the territory of Carolana. The king granted Heath this charter to spread Christianity into the New World and lead a colony, as well as to increase trade, particularly in tobacco. Heath had already explored much of the region and was a council member of the Virginia Colony. Soon after receiving the charter, Heath began making deals to allow French Protestants colonize the area, but King Charles only granted permission to English people, no French or Catholics. The land was then sold to various individuals in an attempt to form lasting colonies.

=== Coxe patent ===
Dr. Daniel Coxe, an English physician and land speculator, acquired the title to Carolana from Sir Robert Heath and owned the patent from 1698 to 1730. Coxe was called to present his claim to the Board of Trade in 1719, because they were trying to settle colonial boundaries with France under the Treaty of Utrecht. He reasserted his claim to the territory, but his colony never materialized. Coxe was a prime advocate for the expansion of Great Britain's colonization of North America westwards across the Appalachian Mountains. He was granted permission by King William III to settle the area with French Protestant refugees, Huguenots, who were fleeing from the Revocation of the Edict of Nantes. Coxe's Son Colonel Daniel Coxe Jr. wrote a piece titled "A Description of the English Province of Carolana, by the Spaniards called Florida, and by the French La Louisiane, as also of the great and famous river Meschacebe or Mississippi".

=== Spanish War ===
The Anglo-Spanish War (1625–1630) created tension between the countries and their race to colonize the Americas. King Charles I took the throne in 1625, and unlike his predecessor King James I who was avoiding conflict with the Spanish, Charles I was actively vying for land in the Americas and supported expeditions. By 1629, Charles I had granted Heath the land of Carolana and wanted the expeditions for colonization to consist of only English people who were a part of the Church of England, no Protestants were allowed in these colonies. Carolana had several different proprietors over its lifetime, so many that there was confusion over who owned the patent.

=== Dissolution ===
The Carolana project ultimately failed, unlike other early colonial enterprises like Massachusetts Bay Colony and Colony of Virginia. The province failed due to lack of funds and resources, and because there were competing colonies, the Virginia Colony and Massachusetts Bay region, where most North American colonists would rather settle due to the stability of the colonies. It was difficult to get colonizers to want to move to the region due to their tendency to move from colony to colony, they rarely settled in one place long if the profits did not seem promising. During the time that England was trying to colonize the area, the Caribbean seemed like a more successful venture than Carolana. Religion was another factor in regards to the failure of Carolana, because many of the proposed colonists were to be French refugees, but the English government wanted only people devoted to the Church of England.
