= Barbados Slave Code =

1661 slave law in English colony of Barbados

The Barbados Slave Code of 1661, officially titled as An Act for the better ordering and governing of Negroes, was a law passed by the Parliament of Barbados to provide a legal basis for slavery in the English colony of Barbados and, ostensibly, to standardize procedures for managing the island's increasing slave population, which had tripled since 1640. It is the first comprehensive Slave Act, and the code's preamble, which stated that the law's purpose was to "protect them [slaves] as we do men's other goods and Chattels", established that black slaves would be treated as chattel property in the island's court.

== Details ==
The slave code described black people as "an heathenish, brutish and an uncertaine, dangerous kind of people".

The Barbados slave code ostensibly sought to protect slaves from cruel masters ("the Negroes and other Slaves be well provided for, and guarded from the Cruelties and Insolences of themselves or other ill-tempered People or Owners") and masters (and "any Christian") from unruly slaves; in practice, it provided extensive protections for masters, but not for slaves. The law required masters to provide each slave with one set of clothing per year, but it set no standards for slaves' diet, housing, or working conditions. It denied slaves, as chattels, even basic human rights guaranteed under common law, such as the right to life. It allowed the slaves' owners to do entirely as they wished to their slaves for anything considered a misdeed, including mutilating them and burning them alive, without fear of reprisal. For example, if a Black person was found guilty of inflicting violence against a white person, the code stipulated that they should be "severely whipped", have "his or her nose slit and shall be burnt in the face", while the next offence shall be "punished by death". However, "if any Man shall of wantonness, or only of Bloody Mindedness, or Cruel Intention, willfully kill a Negro or other Slave of his own, he shall pay into the Publick Treasury ... if he shall so kill another Man's, He shall pay to the Owner of the Negro, double the Value, and into the Publick Treasury ... And he shall further by the next Justice of the Peace, be bound to the good Behaviour".

The Barbados Assembly reenacted the slave code, with minor modifications, in 1676 titled as "A Supplemental Act to a Former Act for the Better Ordering and Governing of Negroes", 1682, and 1688 titled as "An Act for the Governing of Negroes". The slave codes (not digitised) are available at The National Archives. The laws of colonial Barbados to 1699, including those comprising the Slave Code, were collected in a book available online, The laws of Barbados collected in one volume by William Rawlin, of the Middle-Temple. In particular No. 329 details the 1688 Act (the entry for the original 1661 Act, No. 57, reads only "Repealed by Act 330"—an error, actually 329).

"No person of the Hebrew Nation residing in any Sea-Port Town of this Island, shall keep or employ any Negro or other Slave ... for any Use or Service whatsoever."

In 2021 the British Library digitised and made public 19th-century newspapers of Barbados (the originals remaining on the island) hoping that the public would help to find information about individual slaves on the island; names and descriptions were only made known for slaves who revolted or escaped, and are lost to history unless recorded in newspapers.

== Wider influence ==
Throughout British North America, slavery evolved in practice before it was codified into law. The Barbados slave code of 1661 marked the beginning of the legal codification of slavery. According to historian Russell Menard, "Since Barbados was the first English colony to write a comprehensive slave code, its code was especially influential."

The Barbados Slave Code served as the basis for the slave codes adopted in several other British American colonies, including Jamaica, Carolina (1696), Georgia, and Antigua. In other colonies where the codes are not an exact copy, such as Virginia and Maryland, the influence of the Barbados Slave Code can be traced throughout various provisions.

The legal basis for slavery was established in Mexico in 1636. These statutes created the status of chattel slave for those of African descent, i.e. they were slaves for life and the status of slave was inherited. Slave status passed to children through the mother in these statutes. Virginia's 1662 statute reads, "All children borne in this country shall be held bond or free only according to the condition of the mother."

== Excerpt ==
If any Negro or slave whatsoever shall offer any violence to any Christian by striking or any other form of violence, such Negro or slave shall for his or her first offence be severely whipped by the Constable.

For his second offence of that nature he shall be severely whipped, his nose slit, and be burned in some part of his face with a hot iron. [...] And being brutish slaves, [they] deserve not, for the baseness of their condition, to be tried by the legal trial of twelve men of their peers, as the subjects of England are.

And it is further enacted and ordained that if any Negro or other slave under punishment by his master unfortunately shall suffer in life or member, which seldom happens, no person whatsoever shall be liable to any fine therefore.

== See also ==
- Barbados Servant Code
- Emancipation Day
- Indian slave trade between Barbados and South Carolina
- Slave Trade Acts
- Slavery Abolition Act 1833
