= Moses Grandy =

Self-emancipated American (c. 1786–aft. 1840

- Born: Moses Grandy; 1786 (Note: There are differing accounts of Grandy's year of birth. Waverley Traylor reports that it was in 1768, Sobel says 1796. Most sites, like the Documenting the South website, say that he was born about 1785. Bill Bartel safely says the late 1700s.); Camden, North Carolina
- Died: Unknown
- Occupations: Author and abolitionist

Moses Grandy (c. 1786 – unknown) was an African-American author, abolitionist, and, for more than the first four decades of his life, an enslaved person. At eight years of age, he became the property of his white playmate, James Grandy, and two years later, he was hired out for work. The monies Moses earned were collected and held until James Grandy turned 21. Moses helped build the Great Dismal Swamp Canal and learned how to navigate boats. It was that skill that led him to be made commander of several boats that traveled the canal and Pasquotank River, transporting merchandise from Elizabeth City, North Carolina, to Norfolk, Virginia. The position allowed him to be better fed, shod, and dressed. Able to keep a portion of his earnings, Moses arranged to buy his freedom twice, and twice, his enslavers kept the money and held him in slavery. An arrangement was made for an honorable man to buy him, and Grandy earned the money to buy his freedom a third time, this time successfully.

In the course of his life, he had witnessed beatings and sales of family members, including his first bride, only eight months after their marriage. Once he obtained his freedom, he worked to make money to free his wife and children. He was able to secure the release of his wife and 15-year-old son. He dictated a narrative of his life, Narrative of the Life of Moses Grandy, Late a Slave in the United States of America, to buy the freedom of additional family members.

His slave narrative and others, read in the United States and overseas, helped to bring awareness of slavery and fuel the abolitionist movement.

== Early life ==
In the late 1700s, Moses Grandy was born in Camden County, North Carolina, into slavery. He was owned by Billy Grandy and raised with his children. When he was about eight years old, Moses was inherited by James Grandy, his playmate of the same age, who was his deceased enslaver's son.

His family was separated when his siblings and father were sold. His mother sometimes hid some of her children to prevent them from being sold. Among the people that Grandy witnessed being beaten were his mother, a pregnant woman, and a 12-year-old boy, who was beaten until he died. He was subject to beatings, and not having enough to eat, he was also half-starved.

== Enslaved life ==
Grandy was hired out by James Grandy when he was 10. The second man he worked for, Jeremy Coate, beat him so severely for not hilling corn as he wanted it that the sapling broke off in his side. Enoch Sawyer, an owner of large tracts of land in Pasquotank and Camden counties, fed him so little that Grandy ground cornhusks into flour for food. By 15 he was managing ferry crossings of a swampy river in Camden, North Carolina, at Sawyer's Ferry (later Lamb's Ferry); He was "in charge of poling and sculling and cabling the ferry". He lived on Sawyer's plantation, placed his bare feet in heated mud from a hog's nighttime slumber for warmth, and visited his mother, who lived in a cabin in a remote area on non-arable land outside of Camden after she became "too infirm to work". The money made through Moses Grandy's work was received and held for James Grandy until he turned 21.

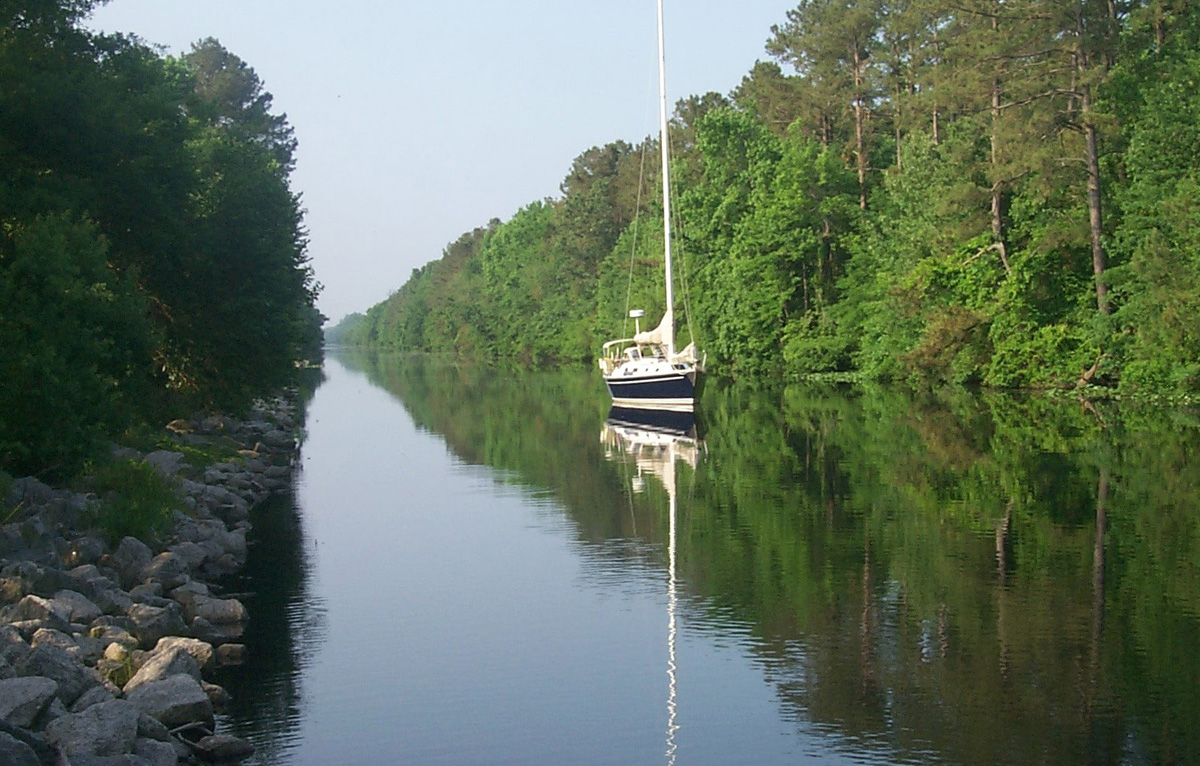
Great Dismal Swamp Canal

Grandy worked jobs transporting goods to Portsmouth and Norfolk, Virginia, and running boats and cutting timber for the Great Dismal Swamp Canal. Although well-skilled at managing craft on the river, he also worked for a time as field hand and a look-out for his gambling boss. Several bosses after Sawyer, Grandy worked for a man named Richard Furley, who allowed Grandy to take on extra work, working nights and Sundays, taking a share of the receipts. James Grandy called in all the enslaved people he had rented out to others and allowed Grandy to continue doing extra work, but took twice as much as Furley's percentage of the receipts.

He was young yet and had seen a rough go of things already, but he was old enough to know that his life should not be all brutish work and near starvation and standing on the ceremony and bad habits of white men.

— Bland Simpson

In the winter of 1813, James Grandy's brother-in-law and a merchant, Charles Grice, approached him to hire 21-year-old Moses out as a freightboat captain. He became commander, ultimately Captain Moses Grandy, of up to four boats that navigated and transported goods on the Great Dismal Swamp Canal and the difficult, curvy Pasquotank River, the only navigable waterways between Elizabeth City, North Carolina, and Norfolk, Virginia, once the British closed off Chesapeake Bay in the War of 1812. Underclothed and underfed, he had better food, shoes, and a coat once he started working for Grice and Norfolk merchant Moses Myers. His pay was now based on the value of the successfully transported merchandise.

Grandy "married" a woman (enslaved people could not marry legally), who he said he loved "as I loved my life". She lived on a plantation, and one day, as he was poling a boat through the river, he heard a woman call his name. He saw his wife in a slave coffle as she was being walked to a boat that would take her south and away from him. Disconcerted, he lost his grip on the pole and fell into the water. She called out, "I am gone." Grandy made it to shore to learn that her former enslaver needed money and thus sold some of the people he enslaved, and, at gunpoint, that there was nothing Grandy could do to change that inevitability. They had been "married" eight months, were settling well into marriage, and she may have been pregnant. They never saw each other again.

He earned enough money to buy his freedom, but two different enslavers stole his money.

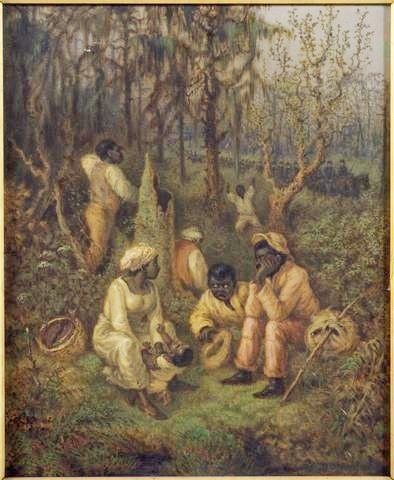
A late 19th-century depiction of slaves in the Great Dismal Swamp

First, he made installments to James Grandy, for which he received receipts toward the $600 to buy his freedom. After the final payment was made and within eyesight of the courthouse, James Grandy asked for the receipts in exchange for his signature on the papers to free him. Moses gave him the receipts. Grandy tore up the receipts and went to the tavern to drink rather than walk toward the courthouse. Instead of giving Moses his freedom, James sold him to another enslaver, Mr. Trewitt, and kept the money Moses paid. Outraged at her brother's dishonorable behavior, his sister and her husband, Charles Grice took him to court to have him honor his agreement. That having failed, other whites reacted by having him removed from the boarding house he lived in.

Moses, owned now by Trewitt and having lost his savings, was hired out again. Trewitt kept a share of the money Moses earned, and Moses Grandy saved another $600. When he had saved up what Trewitt demanded to buy his freedom, Trewitt took the money but did not free him.

Grandy went into a deep depression. His enslaver threatened to sell him, meaning he would be separated from his second wife. At the thought of being separated again from a loved one, he said in desperation, "I would cut my throat from ear to ear rather than go with him." His enslaver, realizing the financial impact of such a measure, withdrew the offer to sell him.

Ironically, one of the most brutal slave overseers, a Mr. Brooks, was outraged by the second time in which Grandy's money was taken without securing his freedom. He notified Grandy that a man, Edward Minner, might be able to help secure his freedom. Grandy recounted the experiences he had to a white man he believed to be honorable, Edward Minner, who agreed to buy him for $650 and have him earn back the price of the sale to obtain his freedom.

By the end of three years from the time he [Minner] laid down the money, I entirely repaid my very kind and excellent friend. During this time he made no claim whatsoever on my services; I was altogether on the footing of a free man, as far as a colored man can there be free.

When...my freedom was quite secure, my feelings were greatly excited. I felt to myself so light, that I could almost think I could fly; in my sleep I was always dreaming of flying over woods and rivers. My gait was so altered by my gladness, that people often stopped me, saying, "Grandy, what is the matter?" I excused myself as well as I could; but many perceived the reason, and said, "O! he is so pleased with having got his freedom."

== Freedom ==
Narrative of the life of Moses Grandy

Having papers that proved he was free, at Minner's suggestion, he moved to Providence, Rhode Island. Within two months, he missed his family. He returned to North Carolina and obtained work to earn his family's freedom. Minner died one year later, and Grandy returned to the safer North to earn money for their freedom. While there, he earned the affection of people who found "his benevolence, affection, kindness of heart, and elasticity of spirit...truly remarkable," according to abolitionist George Thompson. To earn money for their freedom, he recounted his life story, including the emotional and physical torment, which was published and sold. To fellow African Americans, he stated his beliefs that the whites who had harmed his family and other enslaved people would face the judgment of God in the afterlife.

The family members that Grandy wanted to buy their freedom included his wife, four of his six children — one of his daughters earned the money to free herself and one of her sisters — and four grandchildren. (Note: Schermerhorn states that by the time Grandy had his narrative published, six of his children, three girls and three boys, had been "sold to New Orleans.")

In 1840, Grandy was listed in the Boston Directory, and his profession was a laborer. He lived with his wife and four young men. (Note: The household had six people, a man and a woman between 36 and 54, 3 males between 10 and 23, and one man between 24 and 35.) Grandy worked in coal yards, sawed wood, and took cargo on and off vessels. Then, he had a position on the ship James Murray as a seaman. There, he earned the same pay as white sailors, which was about $16 per month (equivalent to $516 in 2025). The position provided stability in that room and board was provided for him, the term of employment was virtually guaranteed for the length of a voyage, and he made more money than he would likely have made on land. Saving his earnings working on the James Murray, he purchased his wife for $300 and arranged the freedom of his 15-year-old son.

== Abolitionist and author ==
Grandy believed abolitionists in the United States, England, and Ireland (at that time, not an independent country) were important in the fight to abolish slavery. In 1842, he traveled to London to help the abolitionist cause by providing a firsthand account of the cruelties of slavery in the United States. As he was "perfectly illiterate", he dictated his autobiography, Narrative of the Life of Moses Grandy, Late a Slave in the United States of America, to fellow abolitionist George Thompson, according to an introductory letter of the latter, and it was published in 1843. According to its title page, the book's purpose was to obtain the money to buy his remaining children and other family members. A second edition was printed the following year. It was one of the slave narratives read in the United States and overseas that fueled the abolitionist movement.

His descendant Eric Sheppard, who wrote the book Ancestor's Call, estimated that Moses saved a total of $3,000 in 1844 currency, equivalent to $104,000 in 2025.

== Legacy ==
In 2006 Moses Grandy Trail, a portion of Virginia State Route 165, was named in his honor.

== Published book ==
- Narrative of the Life of Moses Grandy, Late a Slave in the United States of America, London: Gilpin, 1843.

== See also ==
- Slave narrative
  - Lunsford Lane
  - Moses Roper

== Sources ==
- Andrews, William L., ed. (2003), North Carolina Slave Narratives: The Lives of Moses Roper, Lunsford Lane, Moses Grandy, & Thomas H. Jones, University of North Carolina Press, ISBN 0-8078-2821-1.
- Lee, Julia, Moses Grandy, Oxford African American Studies Center.
