= Peter Colleton =

English politician and slave trader

Arms of Colleton: Or, three stag's heads couped proper

Sir Peter Colleton, 2nd Baronet, FRS (17 September 1635 – 24 March 1694) was an English politician and slave trader.

He was the eldest son of Sir John Colleton, 1st Baronet, of Exeter, Devon, whom he succeeded in 1667.

He became a merchant and was a Member of the council of the Barbados in 1664–1684. He was a member of the Royal Adventurers into Africa in 1667–1672 and a member of the Hudson's Bay Company from 1670 to his death.

He was elected a Fellow of the Royal Society in 1677.

He was MP for Bossiney (UK Parliament constituency) in 1681–1685 and 1689–1694.

Baronetage of England
Preceded by John Colleton	Baronet (of London); 1667–1694	Succeeded by John Colleton
