= Colleton baronets =

Extinct baronetcy in the Baronetage of England

Escutcheon of the Colleton baronets of London

Arms of Colleton: Or, three stag's heads couped proper

The Colleton Baronetcy, of London, was a title in the Baronetage of England. It was created on 18 February 1661 for John Colleton, in reward for his support for the Royalist cause during the Civil War. The second Baronet represented Bossiney in Parliament. The title became extinct on the death of the ninth Baronet in 1938.

== Colleton baronets, of London (1661) ==
- Sir John Colleton, 1st Baronet (c. 1608–1667)
- Sir Peter Colleton, 2nd Baronet (1635–1694)
- Sir John Colleton, 3rd Baronet (1669–1754)
- Sir John Colleton, 4th Baronet (1738–1778)
- Sir John Snell Colleton, 5th Baronet (1775–1801)
- Sir James Nassau Colleton, 6th Baronet (1752–1815)
- Sir James Roupell Colleton, 7th Baronet (1783–1848)
- Sir Robert Augustus Fulford Graves Colleton, 8th Baronet (1824–1866)
- Sir Robert Augustus William Colleton, 9th Baronet (1854–1938), who left no heir.
