= Province of Carolina =

Former British province in North America

- Province of Great Britain
- 1663–1712
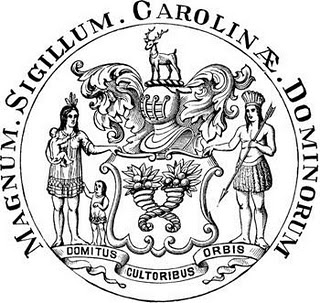
- British Red Ensign Seal

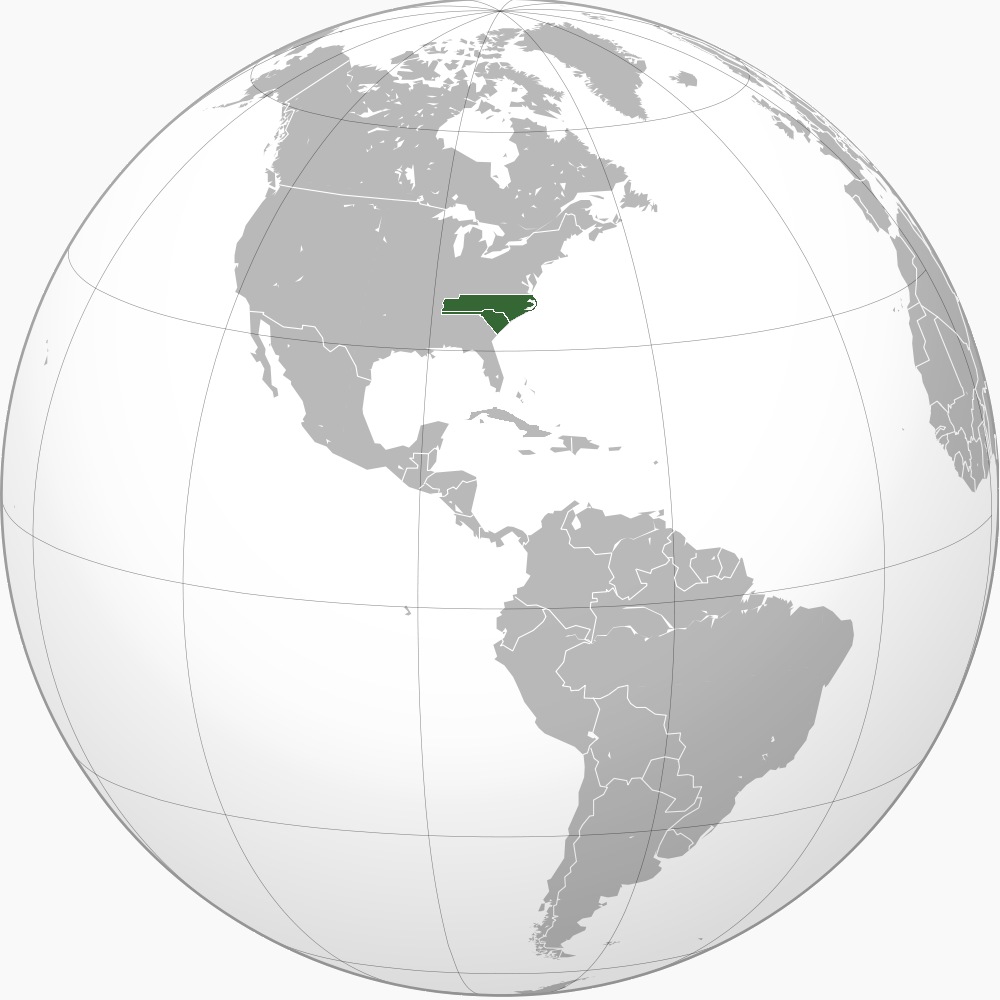
- Location within North America
- Capital: Charlestown
- Area
  - Coordinates: 34°48′17″N 79°40′31″W
- Government
  - Type: Proprietary colony
  - Motto: Domitus Cultoribus Orbis (Latin) "Tamed by the cultivators of the world"
- Lords proprietors
  - 1663: Edward, Earl of Clarendon; George, Duke of Albemarle; William, Earl of Craven; John, Lord Berkeley; Anthony, Lord Ashley; Sir George Carteret; Sir William Berkeley; Sir John Colleton
- Governor
  - 1692–1693: Philip Ludwell (first)
  - 1710–1712: Robert Gibbes (last)
- Legislature
  - Upper house: Grand Council
  - Lower house: Parliament of Carolina
- Historical era: Stuart era
  - Proprietors First Charter: March 24, 1663
  - Proprietors Second Charter: June 30, 1665
  - Partition of Carolina: January 24, 1712
Preceded by
Carolana
Cofitachequi
Joara
Succeeded by
Province of North Carolina
Province of South Carolina
- Today part of: United States: Alabama; East Louisiana; Georgia; Mississippi; North Carolina; North Florida; South Carolina; Tennessee

Carolina, officially the Province of Carolina, was a province of Great Britain in America that existed from 1663 until 1712; when the Lords Proprietors of the Province of Carolina partitioned it into the provinces of North Carolina and South Carolina. Today it makes up a significant part of the U.S. states of Alabama, Florida, Georgia, Mississippi, North Carolina, South Carolina, and Tennessee.

== Etymology ==
"Carolina", named in honor of King Charles I, is taken from the Latin word for "Charles" (Carolus).

== History ==
=== Virginia land grants ===
On October 30, 1629, King Charles granted a patent to Sir Robert Heath for the lands south of 36 degrees and north of 31 degrees, "under the name, in honor of that king, of Carolana." Heath wanted the land for French Huguenots, but when Charles restricted use of the land to members of the Church of England, Heath assigned his grant to George, Lord Berkeley. Charles was executed in 1649 and Heath fled to France where he died. Following the 1660 restoration of the monarchy, Heath's heirs attempted to reassert their claim to the land, but Charles II ruled the claim invalid.

Although the Lost Colony on Roanoke Island was the first English attempt at settlement in the Carolina territory, the first permanent English settlement was not established until the 1653 Albemarle Settlement, when emigrants from the Virginia Colony, with others from New England and Bermuda, settled at the mouths of the Chowan and Roanoke Rivers, on the shores of Albemarle Sound, in the northeastern corner of present-day North Carolina.

Within three generations of Columbus, the Spanish from their Florida base had started to emigrate up the coast of modern North Carolina. A Virginia tribe defending their resources and families drove them back to Georgia. A Scottish contingent had meanwhile settled in South Carolina only to be extirpated by the Spanish, who inhabited Parris Island as late as 1655. The Spanish were again beaten back to Georgia.

=== Proprietors First Charter ===
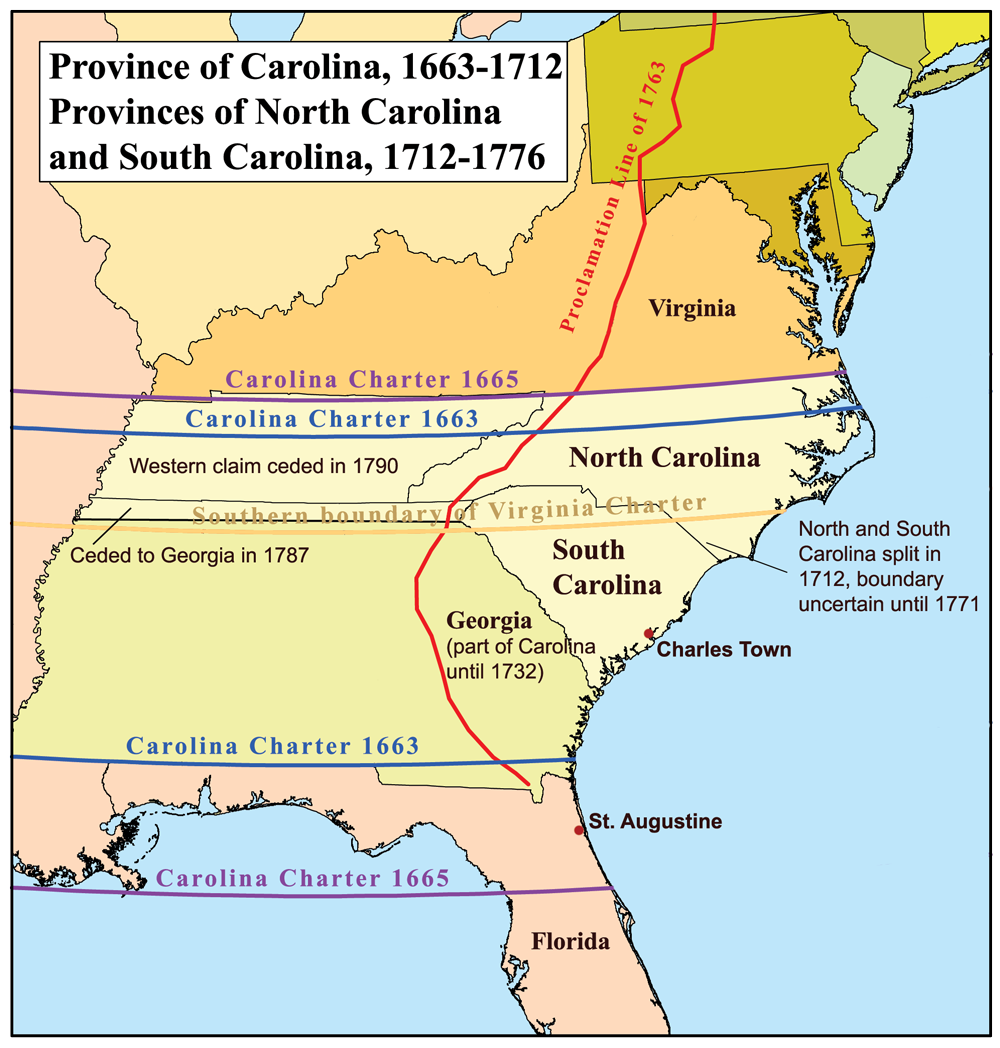
The Province of Carolina before and after the split into north and south

On March 24, 1663, Charles II issued a new charter to a group of eight English noblemen, granting them the land of Carolina as a reward for their faithful support of his efforts to regain the throne of England. The eight noblemen were styled Lords Proprietors of the Province of Carolina.

The 1663 charter granted the Lords Proprietor title to all of the land from the southern border of the Virginia Colony at 36 degrees north to 31 degrees north; this included all the land between these northerly and southerly bounds from the Atlantic westward to the shores of the Pacific Ocean. The King intended for the newly created province to serve as an English bulwark to contest lands claimed by Spanish Florida and prevent their northward expansion.

The Lords Proprietors were:

- Edward, Earl of Clarendon
- George, Duke of Albemarle
- William, Earl of Craven
- John, Lord Berkeley
- Anthony, Lord Ashley
- Sir George Carteret
- Sir William Berkeley
- Sir John Colleton

Of the eight, the one who demonstrated the most active interest in Carolina was Cooper, Earl of Shaftesbury. Shaftesbury, with the assistance of his secretary, the philosopher John Locke, drafted the Grand Model for the Province of Carolina (which included the Fundamental Constitutions of Carolina), a plan for government of the colony heavily influenced by the ideas and utopian aspirations of English political scientist James Harrington. Some of the other Lords Proprietors also had interests in other colonies: for instance, John Berkeley and George Carteret held stakes in the Province of New Jersey, and William Berkeley had an interest in Virginia.

The Lords Proprietors, operating under their royal charter, exercised their authority with nearly the independence of the king himself. The colony's government consisted of a governor, a powerful council, on which half of the councilors were appointed by the Lords Proprietors themselves, and a relatively weak, popularly elected assembly.

In 1663, Captain William Hilton noted the presence of a wooden cross erected by the Spaniards that still stood before the town meeting house of the Indians living at what later became Port Royal. In 1665, Sir John Yeamans established a second short-lived English settlement on the Cape Fear River, near present-day Wilmington, North Carolina, which he named Clarendon. From 1675 to 1677, the Province and Chowanoc Natives fought.

=== Proprietors Second Charter ===
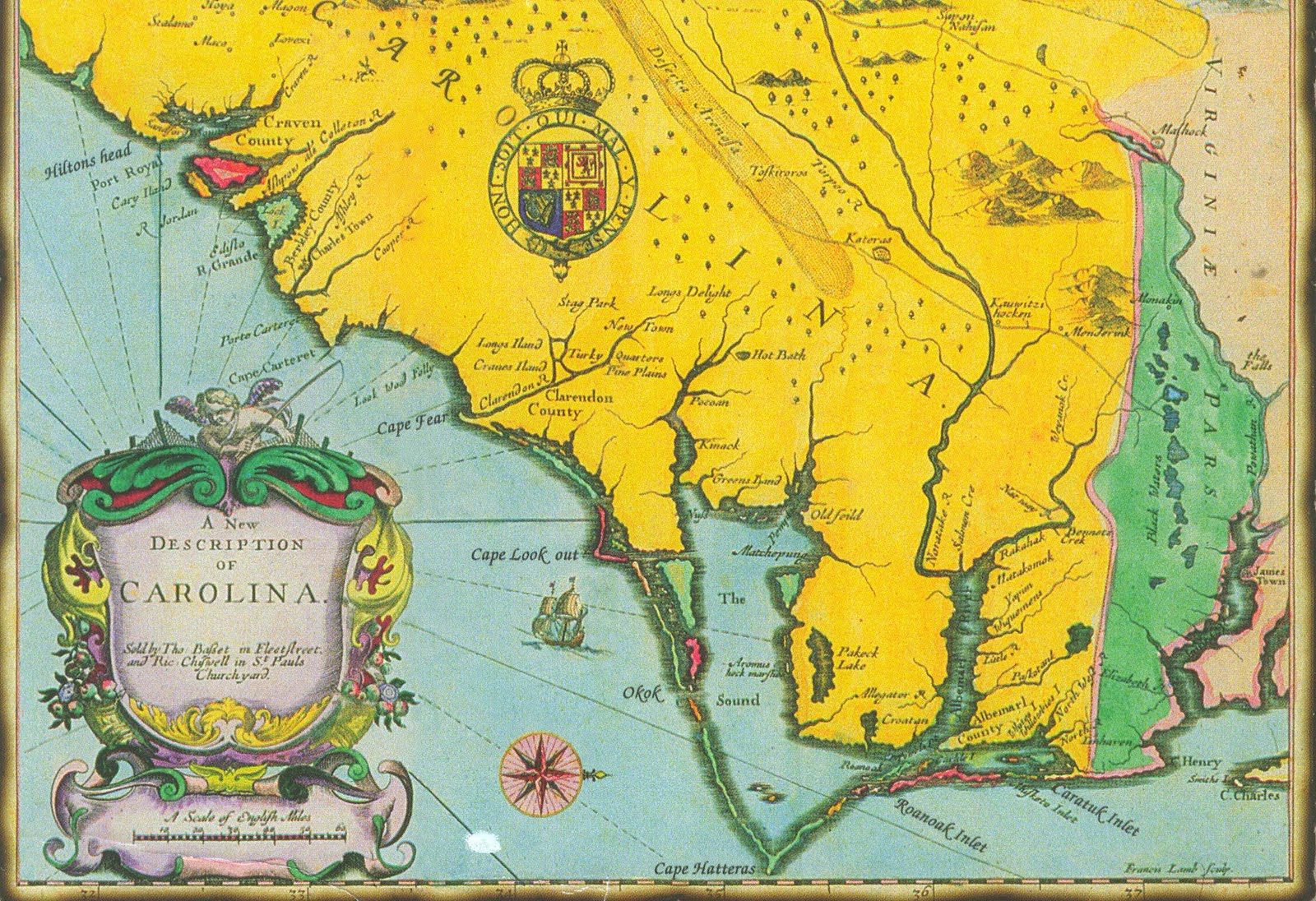
Map of Carolina (1676)

On June 30, 1665; the charter was revised slightly, with the northerly boundary extended to 36 degrees 30 minutes north to include the lands of settlers along the Albemarle Sound who had left the Virginia Colony. Likewise, the southern boundary was moved south to 29 degrees north, just south of present-day Daytona Beach, Florida, which had the effect of including the existing Spanish settlement at St. Augustine.

In 1669, William Sayle of Bermuda had taken over the command of the party of settlers gathered in Bermuda after Sir John Yeamans resigned while undergoing repairs of his vessel in Bermuda. Most of the party was made up of emigrants from England who had arrived in Bermuda en route to the establishment of the settlement in the Carolinas. Sayle arrived in Carolina aboard a Bermuda sloop with a number of Bermudian families to found the town of Charlestown.

In early 1670 the Lords Proprietors founded a sturdier new settlement named Charles Town (present-day Charleston) when they sent 150 colonists to the province, landing them on the south bank of the Ashley River, South Carolina. The town moved across the river to a more defensible site on the peninsula between the Ashley and Cooper Rivers in 1680.

In 1670, William Sayle, then in his eighties, became the first Colonial Governor of the colony of Carolina. Many of the other colonists were planters from Barbados. The "Charles Town" settlement, as it was known then, developed more rapidly than the Albemarle and Cape Fear settlements due to the advantages of a natural harbor and expanding trade with the West Indies. Charles Town was made the principal seat of government for the entire province; Lord Shaftesbury specified its street plan. The nearby Ashley and Cooper rivers are named for him.

Due to their remoteness from each other, the northern and southern sections of the colony operated more or less independently until 1691, when Philip Ludwell was appointed governor of the entire province. From that time until 1708, the northern and southern settlements remained under one government. The north continued to have its own assembly and council; the governor resided in Charles Towne and appointed a deputy-governor for the north. During this period, the two halves of the province began increasingly to be known as North Carolina and South Carolina.

Some identify the 1708–1710 period as the establishment of separate colonies, but that did not officially occur until 1729 when seven of the Lords Proprietors sold their interests in Carolina to the Crown, and both North Carolina and South Carolina became royal colonies. The eighth share was Sir George Carteret's, which had passed to his great-grandson John Carteret, 2nd Earl Granville. He retained ownership of a sixty-mile-wide strip of land in North Carolina adjoining the Virginia boundary, which became known as the Granville District. This district was to become the scene of many disputes, from 1729 until the American Revolutionary War, at which time it was seized by the North Carolina revolutionary government. Governments under proprietary rule and under crown rule were similarly organized. The primary difference was who was to appoint the governing officials: the Lords Proprietors or the Sovereign.

Although the division between the northern and southern governments became complete in 1712, both colonies remained in the hands of the same group of proprietors. A rebellion against the proprietors broke out in Charlestown, South Carolina (as it was now spelled) in 1719, which led to the appointment of a royal governor for South Carolina in that same year. North Carolina would become a royal colony in 1729.

== Government ==
In 1669, the Fundamental Constitutions of Carolina divided the colony of Carolina into two provinces, Albemarle province in the north and Clarendon province in the south. Due to dissent over the governance of the colony, and the distance between settlements in the northern half and settlements in the southern half, a deputy governor was appointed to administer the northern half of Carolina (Albemarle province) in 1691. In 1712, the two provinces became separate colonies, the colony of North Carolina (formerly Albemarle province) and the colony of South Carolina (formerly Clarendon province).

Carolina was the first of three colonies in North America settled by the English to have a comprehensive plan. Known as the Grand Model, or Grand Modell, it was composed of a constitution and detailed guidelines for settlement and development. The constitution, titled Fundamental Constitutions of Carolina, was drafted by the philosopher John Locke under the direction of Anthony Ashley Cooper (later made Earl of Shaftesbury).

From 1708 to 1710, due to disquiet over attempts to establish the Anglican church in the province, the people were unable to agree on a slate of elected officials; consequently, there was no recognized and legal government for more than two years, a period which culminated in Cary's Rebellion when the Lords Proprietors finally commissioned a new governor. This circumstance, coupled with the Tuscarora War and the Yamasee War, and the inability of the Lords Proprietors to act decisively, led to separate governments for North and South Carolina.

== Demographics ==
Population
Year	1660	1670	1680	1690	1700	1710
Pop.	1,000	4,050	6,630	11,500	16,424	26,003
±%	—	+305.0%	+63.7%	+73.5%	+42.8%	+58.3%
Source: 1660–1710;

Preceded by Province of Carolana; 1629–1663	Province of Carolina; 1663–1712	Succeeded by Province of North Carolina; 1712–1776; Province of South Carolina; 1712–1776
