= Sir John Colleton, 1st Baronet =

British Baronet (1608–1666)

John Colleton
- 1st Baronet
- Reign: 1661–66
- Successor: Peter Colleton
- Born: 1608
- Died: 1666 (aged 57–58)
- Spouse: Katherine Amey
- Issue: 7
- Father: Peter Colleton
- Mother: Ursula Hull

Arms of Colleton: Or, three stag's heads couped proper

Sir John Colleton, 1st Baronet (1608–1666) served King Charles I during the English Civil War. He rose through the Royalist ranks during the conflict, but later had his land-holdings seized when the Cavaliers were finally defeated by Parliamentary forces. Following the Restoration of the Monarchy in 1660, he was one of eight individuals rewarded with grants of land in Carolina by King Charles II for having supported his efforts to regain the throne.

== Origins ==
He was the second son of Peter Colleton (d.1622) of Exeter in Devon, Sheriff of Exeter in 1618, who was born in the parish of Monkenzeale who following his death in 1622 was buried at St Olave's Church in Exeter. His mother was Ursula Hull, a daughter of Henry Hull (or Hall) of Exeter, who married John Colleton in 1578 at St Kerrian's Church in Exeter. John's sister Elizabeth Colleton was the wife of Sir Hugh Croker, Mayor of Exeter, a younger son of the Croker family of Lyneham, Yealmpton, in Devon.

== Career ==
=== Civil War ===
He was a Royalist and very active at the beginning of the Civil War, serving as a Captain of foot-soldiers. He received a commission for Colonel from Sir John Berkeley (later Baron Berkeley of Stratton), general of the royalist forces in Devon, signed by the Prince of Wales, and successfully raised a regiment within ten days. He spent £40,000 of his own money in the king's service, and lost a further £7,000 through plunder and sequestration. Eventually he fled to the Island of Barbados. After the Restoration of the Monarchy in 1660 Berkeley petitioned King Charles II on his behalf as follows:

These are humbly to certify your sacred majesty, that John Colleton, some time of Exeter, Esq; engaged for your majesty's royal father, in the beginning of his troubles, raised and commanded a regiment under me, consisting of about 1,100 men well armed, without any charge to his then majesty or compulsion of his people, which was very 'costly to him, he neither receiving any pay or free quarter to my knowledge, and the soldiers very little of either; that he furnished moneys and arms to a good value when he was driven from his habitation and estate in Cornwall before the battle of Stratton, for which, I am confident, he hath not had satisfaction; that he being chosen a commissioner by the county of Exon for the carrying on the service of your majesty's royal father in the associated counties of the west, did there in good service. That he did, at several other times, procure and lend moneys, and procure and furnish good store of arms and ammunition when his majesty's affairs were in great straits, and gave credit, and stayed long for considerable sums yet unpaid of many of them, whereby a good sum must be due unto him. That he suffered much by your majesty's enemies by being of your part, I believe to the value of above sixty thousand pounds, and he was well contented to stay for his disbursements, and bore his sufferings chearfully, proposing to himself no other satisfaction that I could perceive, than your majesty's restauration. That after your majesty's exile, he was ever active and helpful to your majesty's agents in England in his person and with his purse, which I myself know to be true, and have been informed thereof by divers others. That he forsook England for many years, to avoid the oaths, subscriptions, etc., imposed upon your subjects by your enemies, destructive to your majesty's interest, as I found by him, in Holland, in the year 1650, and returned not until your majesty's restauration. That he hath kept his loyalty unspotted to the last, as far as I can be informed or understand. I am sure he hath done your majesty faithful and good service many ways, and all this in order to his duty and allegiance, without any respect to reward or gain that I could perceive by him. 12th of Dec. 1660. - Jo. Berkeley.

=== Created a baronet ===
In recompense for his service during the Civil War, King Charles II in 1661 created him a baronet with territorial designation "of London". And in further recompense for his great services, in conjunction with the Duke of Albemarle, Earl Clarendon, Earl Craven, and four other noble persons, granted by letters patent to them, their heirs, and successors, large dominions in Carolina, and the Bahama Islands.

=== Grants in Carolina ===
In 1663 King Charles II granted Colleton and another seven Lords Proprietors the land called Carolina, named in honour of his father King Charles I. Colleton brought a group of settlers from the Caribbean Isle of Barbados known as the Corporation of Barbados Adventurers. These settlers introduced the cultivation of rice the use of African slaves to the area. Colleton County, South Carolina, is named after him as is Colington, North Carolina.

== Marriage and children ==
In 1634 at St Mary Arches Church in Exeter, he married Katherine Amey, a daughter of Thomas Amey of Exeter, by whom he had children as follows:

- Sir Peter Colleton, 2nd Baronet (1635–1694), eldest son and heir. He was awarded the title of Landgrave, pre-Revolutionary, English colonial titles of nobility in the lowcountry of Carolina, during the late 17th and early 18th centuries.
- John Colleton (d.1668) of St John's College, Oxford, who died unmarried.
- Thomas Colleton (born 1636) of Barbados, created a Landgrave. He married a member of the Mead family, by whom he had children including Elizabeth Colleton, wife of Colonel Thomas Garth and mother of John Garth (1701–1764), a Member of Parliament for Devizes in Wiltshire, whose sons included General George Garth (c.1733–1819) who served in the American War of Independence, a Colonel of the 17th Regiment of Foot and Charles Garth (1734–1784), Colonial Agent for the Provinces of South Carolina, Georgia and Maryland, between 1763 and 1765, who succeeded his father as a Member of Parliament for Devizes, and served as Recorder of Devizes.
- James Colleton (died c.1706) of Barbados, created a Landgrave. He was a governor of the English proprietary Province of Carolina from 1686 to 1690. He married Anne Kendall, a daughter of James Kendall (1647–1708), Governor of Barbados. His son John Colleton of Barbados married Elizabeth Ernle, widow of Thomas Drax of Drax Hall, Barbados and of Ellerton Abbey, Yorkshire, a sister of Sir Edward Ernle, 3rd Baronet (c. 1673–1729) who married the heiress of Charborough House in Dorset. John's son was James Edward Colleton (c.1709–1790), a Member of Parliament for Lostwithiel in Cornwall, who married Lady Anne Cowper, a daughter of William Cowper, 1st Earl Cowper.
- Katherine Colleton (born 1638), eldest daughter, born in the parish of St Olave's, Exeter.
- Anne Colleton (born 1640), 2nd daughter, who married firstly "General Stewart", secondly Humphry Selwood.
- Elizabeth Colleton (1644–1646), 3rd daughter, died in infancy, buried at St Olave's, Exeter.

== Notes ==
Baronetage of England
New creation	Baronet (of London); 1661–1666	Succeeded by Peter Colleton
