= List of colonial governors of South Carolina =

This is a list of colonial governors of South Carolina from 1670 to 1775. Until the beginning of the American Revolution in 1775, South Carolina was a colony of Great Britain. South Carolina was named in honor of King Charles II of England, who first formed the English colony, with Carolus being Latin for "Charles".

== Proprietary period (1670–1719) ==
Governors of the Proprietary Period were appointed either by the Proprietors or the Grand Council convening in Charles Town. In 1663, Charles II granted the land to eight Lords Proprietors in return for their financial and political assistance in restoring him to the throne in 1660.

Governors of the Province of Carolina (1670 to 1719)
No.	Governor (birth-death)	In Office	Notes	Monarch
1	William Sayle (1590-1671)	March 15, 1670 – March 4, 1671	Appointed by John Yeamans	Charles II
2	Joseph West (?-1691)	March 4, 1671 – April 19, 1672	1st time	Charles II
3	John Yeamans (1611-1674)	April 19, 1672 – August 1674		Charles II
	Joseph West (?-1691)	August 1674 – October 1682	2nd time	Charles II
4	Joseph Morton (?-1721)	October 1682 – August 1684	1st time	Charles II
5	Richard Kyrle (1610-1684)	August 1684 – August 30, 1684		Charles II
	Joseph West (?-1691)	August 30, 1684 – July 1, 1685	3rd time	Charles II
	Joseph West (?-1691)	August 30, 1684 – July 1, 1685	3rd time	James II
6	Robert Quary (1644-1712)	July 1, 1685 – October 1685		James II
	Joseph Morton (?-1721)	October 1685 – November 1686	2nd time	James II
7	James Colleton (?-1706)	November 1686 – 1690		James II
7	James Colleton (?-1706)	November 1686 – 1690		William III and Mary II
8	Seth Sothell (?-1694)	1690 – April 11, 1692		William III and Mary II
9	Philip Ludwell (1638-1723)	April 11, 1692 – May 1693		William III and Mary II
10	Thomas Smith (1648-1694)	May 1693 – November 16, 1694		William III and Mary II
11	Joseph Blake (?-1700)	November 16, 1694 – August 17, 1695	1st time	William III
12	John Archdale (1642-1717)	August 17, 1695 – October 29, 1696		William III
	Joseph Blake (?-1700)	October 29, 1696 – September 7, 1700	2nd time	William III
13	James Moore Sr. (1650-1706)	September 7, 1700 – March 1703		William III
13	James Moore Sr. (1650-1706)	September 7, 1700 – March 1703		Anne
14	Nathaniel Johnson (1644-1712)	March 1703 – November 26, 1709		Anne
15	Edward Tynte (?-1710)	November 26, 1709 – July 26, 1710		Anne
16	Robert Gibbes (1644-1715)	June 26, 1710 – March 19, 1712		Anne
17	Charles Craven (1682-1754)	March 19, 1712 – April 23, 1716		Anne
17	Charles Craven (1682-1754)	March 19, 1712 – April 23, 1716		George I
18	Robert Daniell (1646-1718)	April 25, 1716 – 1717		George I
19	Robert Johnson (1682-1735)	1717 – December 21, 1719	1st time	George I

== Royal period (1719–1776) ==
Governors of the Royal Period were appointed by the monarch in name but were selected by the British government under the control of the Board of Trade. Governors served as a viceroy to the British monarch. The governor could appoint provincial officials or suspend their offices on his own authority, except those offices named above that were also appointed by the crown. Legislative bills required royal assent from the governor and could be rejected; he could prorogue or dissolve the Commons House of Assembly on his own authority.

Governors of the Province of South Carolina (1719 to 1775)
No.	Governor (birth-death	In Office	Notes	Monarch
20	James Moore Jr. (1682-1724)	December 21, 1719 – May 30, 1721		George I
21	Francis Nicholson (1655-1728)	May 30, 1721 – May 7, 1725		George I
22	Arthur Middleton (1681-1737)	May 7, 1725 – December 15, 1730		George I
22	Arthur Middleton (1681-1737)	May 7, 1725 – December 15, 1730		George II
	Robert Johnson (1682-1735)	December 15, 1730 – May 3, 1735	2nd time Died in office	George II
23	Thomas Broughton (1668-1737)	May 3, 1735 – November 22, 1737	Died in office	George II
24	William Bull (1682-1755)	November 22, 1737 – December 17, 1743		George II
25	James Glen (1701-1777)	December 17, 1743 – June 1, 1756		George II
26	William Henry Lyttleton (1724-1808)	June 1, 1756 – April 5, 1760		George II
27	William Bull II (1710-1791)	April 5, 1760 – December 22, 1761	1st time	George II
27	William Bull II (1710-1791)	April 5, 1760 – December 22, 1761	1st time	George III
28	Thomas Boone (1730-1812)	December 22, 1761 – May 14, 1764	Exiled to England	George III
	William Bull II (1710-1791)	May 14, 1764 – June 12, 1766	2nd time	George III
29	Charles Greville Montagu (1741-1784)	June 12, 1766 – May 1768	1st time	George III
	William Bull II (1710-1791)	May 1768 – October 30, 1768	3rd time	George III
	Charles Greville Montagu (1741-1784)	October 30, 1768 – July 31, 1769	2nd time	George III
	William Bull II (1710-1791)	July 31, 1769 – September 15, 1771	4th time	George III
	Charles Greville Montagu (1741-1784)	September 15, 1771 – March 6, 1773	3rd time	George III
	William Bull II (1710-1791)	March 6, 1773 – June 18, 1775	5th time	George III
30	William Campbell (1730-1778)	June 18, 1775 – September 15, 1775	Exiled to England; fled Charleston on HMS Tamar	George III
	Henry Laurens (1724-1792)	January 9, 1775 – March 26, 1776	As President of the South Carolina Committee on Safety after Campbell's departure	George III
	Henry Laurens (1724-1792)	January 9, 1775 – March 26, 1776	As President of the South Carolina Committee on Safety after Campbell's departure	Monarchy abolished

== See also ==
- List of governors of South Carolina
- List of colonial governors of North Carolina
- Province of Carolina
- Province of South Carolina
