= Governor Bull =

Governor Bull may refer to:

- Henry Bull (governor) (1610–1694), 12th and 14th Governor of the Colony of Rhode Island and Providence Plantations from 1685 to 1686 and in 1690
- William Bull (governor) (1638–1755), 29th Governor of the Province of South Carolina from 1737 to 1743
- William Bull II (1710–1791), Acting Governor of the Province of South Carolina on five occasions between 1760 and 1775
