= Governor Hardy =

Governor Hardy may refer to:

- Charles Hardy (1710s–1780), Colonial Governor of New York from 1755 to 1757
- Josiah Hardy (1715–1790), Colonial Governor of New Jersey from 1761 to 1763
