= William Franklin =

British colonial official, soldier, and lawyer (1730–1813)

William Franklin FRSE
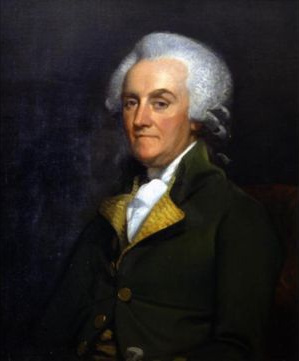
- Portrait, c. 1790

13th Colonial Governor of New Jersey
- In office 24 February 1763 – 19 June 1776
- Monarch: George III
- Preceded by: Josiah Hardy
- Succeeded by: William Livingston (as governor)

Personal details
- Born: 22 February 1730 Philadelphia, Province of Pennsylvania, British America
- Died: 13 November 1813 (aged 83) (Note: New Jersey Department of State gives 13 Nov., Encyclopedia.com gives 16 Nov.) London, England
- Spouses: Elizabeth Downes (m. 1762; died 1777) Mary Johnson d'Evelin (m. 1788; died 1811)
- Relations: Francis Folger Franklin (paternal half-brother); Sarah Franklin Bache (paternal half-sister)
- Children: William Temple Franklin
- Parent(s): Benjamin Franklin; Deborah Read (stepmother)
- Occupation: Soldier, colonial administrator, politician

William Franklin FRSE (22 February 1730 – 13 November 1813) was an American-born attorney, soldier, politician, and colonial administrator. He was the acknowledged extra-marital son of Benjamin Franklin. William Franklin was the last colonial Governor of New Jersey (1763–1776), and a steadfast British Empire Loyalist throughout the American Revolutionary War. He helped sign the charter establishing Rutgers University. In contrast, his father Benjamin was, in later life, one of the most prominent of the Patriot leaders of the American Revolution and a Founding Father of the United States.

Following imprisonment by Patriots in 1776 to 1778, William became the chief leader of the Loyalists. From his base in New York City, he organized military units to fight on the British side. In 1782, he went into exile in Britain. He lived in London until his death in 1813.

== Early life ==
William Franklin was born in Philadelphia, Pennsylvania, then a colony in British America. He was the extra-marital son of Benjamin Franklin, a leading figure in the city. His mother's identity is unknown. Confusion exists about William's birth and parentage because Benjamin Franklin was secretive about his son's origins. In 1750, Benjamin Franklin told his mother that William was nineteen years old, but this may have been an attempt to make the youth appear to have been conceived within marriage. Some older reference books give William's birth year as 1731.

William was raised by his father and Deborah Read, his father's common-law wife; she had been abandoned by her legal husband but not divorced. William always called her his mother. There is some speculation that Deborah Read was William's biological mother, and because of his parents' common-law relationship, the circumstances of his birth were obscured so as not to be politically harmful to him or to their marital arrangement.

William joined a company of Pennsylvania provincial troops in 1746 and spent a winter in Albany in King George's War, obtaining the rank of captain in 1747. As he grew older, he accompanied his father on several missions, including trips to England. Although often depicted as a young child when he assisted his father in the famed kite experiment of 1752, William was at least 21 years old at the time.

== Marriage and family ==
As a young man, William became engaged to Elizabeth Graeme, daughter of prominent Philadelphia physician Dr. Thomas Graeme and step-granddaughter of Pennsylvania's 14th Governor, Sir William Keith. Neither family approved of the match, but when William went to London to study law about 1759, he left with the understanding that Elizabeth would wait for him.

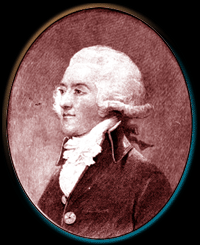
William Temple Franklin, painted by John Trumbull (1790–1791)

William studied law at the Middle Temple, chiefly under Richard Jackson "The Omniscient". While in London, William fathered an illegitimate son, William Temple Franklin, who was born 22 February 1760. His mother has never been identified, and Temple was placed in foster care.

Later that year, William married Elizabeth Downes on 4 September 1762 at St George's, Hanover Square, in London. She was born in the English colony of Barbados to the sugar planter John Downes and his wife, Elizabeth (née Parsons). She met William while visiting England with her father in 1760. They moved to the New Jersey colony in 1763. Elizabeth died in 1777 while William was imprisoned as a Loyalist during the American Revolutionary War. She was interred beneath the altar of St. Paul's Chapel in lower Manhattan, where she had resided after the British evacuated Perth Amboy. The memorial plaque on the wall at St. Paul's was commissioned by William Franklin from London, where he went into exile following the war. He was a widower for more than ten years.

On 14 August 1788, William married Mary Johnson d'Evelin, a wealthy Irish widow with children. William's son, Temple, after a failed business career in the U.S., lived with his father and stepmother for a time, and followed in his grandfather and father's footsteps and had an illegitimate daughter, Ellen (15 May 1798 London – 1875 Nice, France), with Ellen Johnson d'Evelin, the sister-in-law of his stepmother, Mary. William took responsibility for his granddaughter Ellen. Temple moved to Paris, where he lived the remainder of his life and never saw his father again. After Mary died in 1811, William continued to live with Ellen, age 13 at the time, and when he died in 1813 he left most of his small estate to her.

== Colonial governor ==
William Franklin completed his law education in England, and was admitted to the bar. William and Benjamin Franklin became partners and confidants, working together to pursue land grants in what was then called the Northwest (now Midwest). Before they left England, Benjamin lobbied hard to procure his son an appointment, especially working with the Prime Minister Lord Bute.

William was inducted into the original American Philosophical Society, founded by Benjamin Franklin, around 1758.

In 1763, William Franklin was appointed as the Royal Governor of New Jersey. He had asked Lord Bute for the position. Bute made the decision secretly to grant the request, not even informing Benjamin Franklin; he intended the position as a reward for Benjamin's role and a move to weaken the Penn faction. He replaced Josiah Hardy, a merchant and colonial administrator who sided with the New Jersey legislature against the government in London. Franklin during his service as governor signed a charter establishing Rutgers University. Randall states:

Franklin proved an able governor; avoiding quarrels with the assembly, he put forth effort to bring about popular reforms, such as the improvement of roads and construction of bridges. He also worked to secure crop subsidies from England and founded the colony's chancery courts. He encouraged the assembly to grant a charter to Rutgers, the state university, and curtailed imprisonment for debt. He pardoned 105 women sentenced to jail for adultery during his fourteen-year term. The Delaware Indians nicknamed him "Dispenser of Justice" after he hanged two Sussex County men for beheading a prisoner during the Pontiac Rebellion. He also established the first Indian reservation in America at Brotherton in Burlington County.

== American War of Independence ==
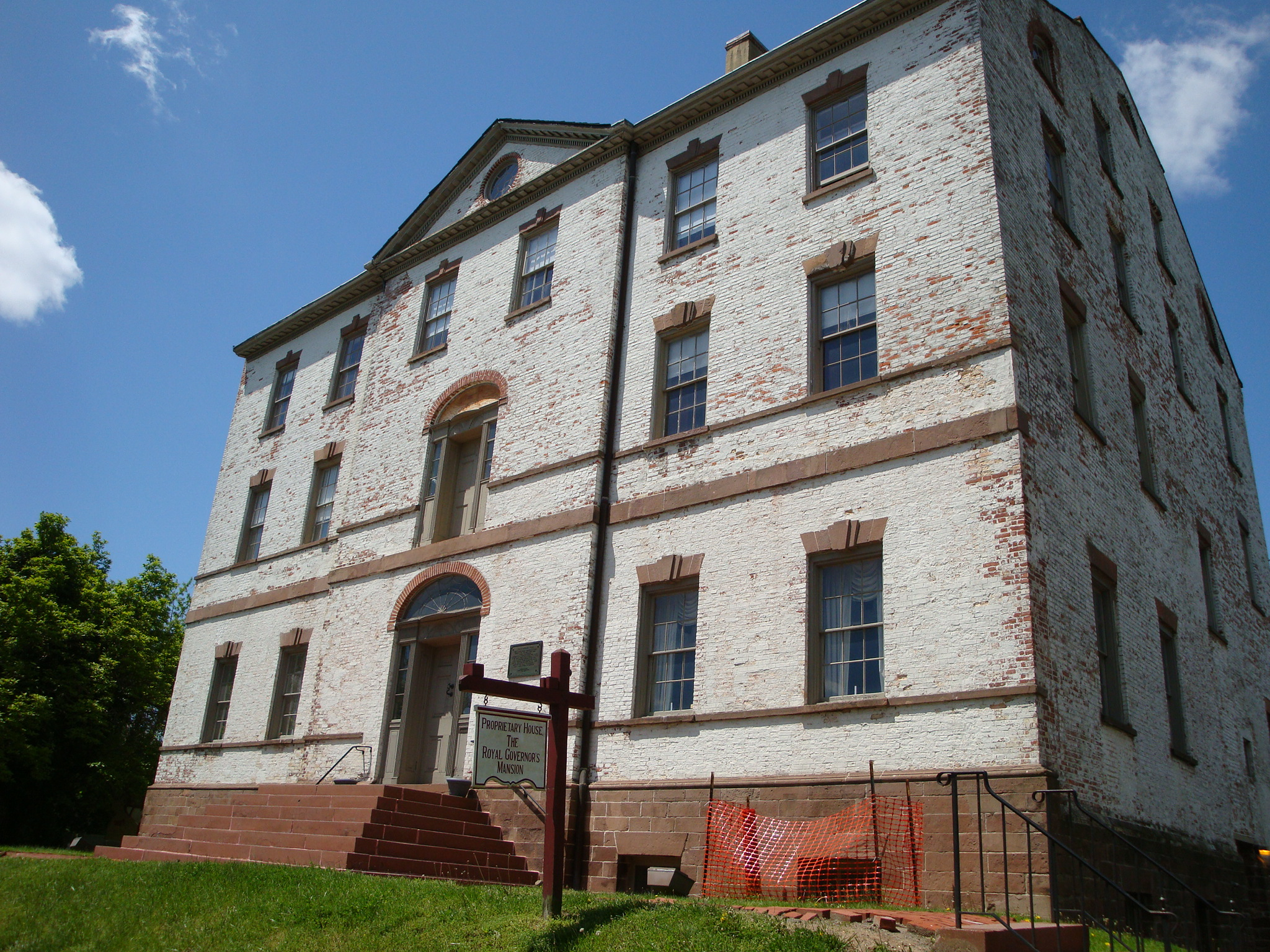
Proprietary House in Perth Amboy, where Franklin lived as governor

Owing to his father's role as a Founding Father and William's loyalty to Britain, the relationship between father and son became strained past the breaking point. When Benjamin decided to take up the Patriot cause, he tried to convince William to join him, but the son refused. After Benjamin Franklin was systematically ridiculed and humiliated by Solicitor-General Alexander Wedderburn before the Privy Council on 29 January 1774, he expected his son to resign in protest. Instead, William advised his father to take his medicine and retire from office.

His Loyalist position was a reflection of his respect for benevolent authority which he felt was embodied by the British Crown, a view consistent with his father's earlier Anglophilia. Further, unlike his father, William was a devout member of the Church of England, which reinforced his loyalty to the Crown. Financially, he needed the salary and perquisites. On 13 January 1775, with revolution seeming imminent, Franklin delivered his "Two Roads" speech to the New Jersey legislature, urging the New Jersey Legislature to take the road toward prosperity by remaining loyal to the Crown rather than a road to civil war and anarchy. The legislature instead unanimously issued a resolution in support of the Patriots in Boston.

=== Capture and imprisonment, 1776–1778 ===
William Franklin remained as governor of New Jersey, and secretly reported Patriot activities to London. He continued as governor until January 1776, when colonial militiamen placed him under house arrest, which lasted until the middle of June. After the Declaration of Independence, Franklin was formally taken into custody by order of the Provincial Congress of New Jersey, an entity which he refused to recognize, regarding it as an "illegal assembly". He was incarcerated in Connecticut for two years, in Wallingford and Middletown. He surreptitiously engaged Americans in supporting the Loyalist cause. Discovered, he was held in solitary confinement at Litchfield, Connecticut for eight months. When finally released in a prisoner exchange in 1778, he moved to New York City, which was under British occupation.

=== New York Loyalist leader, 1778–1781 ===
Once in New York, Boyd Schlenther says he became, "the acknowledged leader of the American loyalists, for whom he struggled to secure aid. He also built up an unofficial yet active spy network." He set up Loyalist military units to fight the Patriots, such as "Bacon's Refugees". In 1779, he had learned through his friend Jonathan Odell and British Major John André that American General Benedict Arnold was planning on secretly defecting to the British.

While in New York, Franklin tried to encourage a guerrilla war and active reprisals against the rebels but was frustrated by British General Henry Clinton, who did not support the idea or have much use for American Loyalists. Nonetheless, Franklin coordinated a multi-colony group known as the Associated Loyalists that waged guerrilla warfare in New York, New Jersey and Connecticut. A correspondence between an associate of Franklin, British General William Tryon, and Lord George Germain led to Franklin receiving official blessing for the operation in 1780.

=== Asgill Affair ===
In 1782, Franklin was implicated in the Loyalist military officer Richard Lippincott's hanging of Joshua Huddy. During a raid, Loyalist troops under Franklin's general oversight captured Huddy, an officer of the New Jersey militia. The Loyalist soldiers hanged him in revenge for similar murders of Loyalists, in particular Huddy's brother-in-law Phillip White. Huddy was a member of the Association of Retaliation, a Patriot group which had attacked and murdered several Loyalist and neutral colonists in New Jersey. At the time, some alleged that Franklin had sanctioned the killing of Huddy. This claim was theoretically substantiated by a note left on Huddy's body, which read, "Up goes Huddy for Philip White."

When he heard of Huddy's death, General George Washington demanded Clinton court-martial Lippincott. At Lippincott's court-martial, his defence successfully argued that as an irregular, he was technically a civilian, and as such was subject to civilian law instead of military law. Chief Justice William Smith ruled that he did not have jurisdiction to try Lippincott since the incident occurred in an area outside effective British control. In response, Washington threatened to summarily execute Captain Charles Asgill, a British officer who had been captured at Yorktown.

Due to the intervention of King Louis XVI of France, who interceded with his American allies to prevent Asgill's execution, Asgill was eventually released by the Continental Congress, where it was agreed he should return to England on parole. Despite the speed with which it was terminated, the Asgill Affair temporarily stalled peace talks between American and British authorities, extending uncertainty over the United States' prospects. Ironically, Benjamin Franklin was a senior negotiator for the Americans in Paris when the Asgill Affair occurred.

== Exile and death ==
The siege of Yorktown in October 1781 dimmed British hopes for victory, and in 1782, Franklin departed for Britain, never to return. Once in London, he became a leading spokesman for the Loyalist community. Because of the continued strength of British forces in North America, in spite of the defeat at Yorktown, many expected Britain to continue fighting the war. The British victory against the French at the Battle of the Saintes and the successful defence of Gibraltar also raised their hopes. In summer 1782, a new British government came to power, who still hoped to achieve a reconciliation with the Americans. In 1783, Franklin visited Scotland and was asked to be a founding member of the Royal Society of Edinburgh.

Benjamin Franklin dedicated his autobiography (written before the war) to his son, though the only mention of William within the manuscript is the inclusion of a newspaper article in which Benjamin noted that his son was authorized to make contracts to purchase carts for the British army. But the father and son were never reconciled; the elder Franklin became known for his uncompromising position related to not providing compensation nor amnesty for Loyalists who left the colonies, during the negotiations in Paris for the Peace of Paris. His son's actions as a Loyalist contributed to his position. The British government gave him £1,800 from the Commissioners of Loyalist Claims. That was the value of his furniture; there was no payment for his lands. He also received a brigadier's half-pay pension of £800 per year.

Franklin sent a letter to his father, dated 22 July 1784, in an attempt at reconciliation. His father never accepted his Loyalist position, but he responded in a letter dated 16 August 1784, in which he states "[We] will endeavor, as you propose mutually to forget what has happened relating to it, as well we can." William saw his father one last time in 1785, when Benjamin stopped in England on his return journey to the U.S. after his time in France. The meeting was brief and involved tying up outstanding legal matters. In a reconciliation attempt, Benjamin also proposed that his son give land that he owned in New York and New Jersey to William's son Temple, who had served as Benjamin's secretary during the war and for whom the elder Franklin had great affection, in order to repay a debt William owed his father; in the event, William transferred the New York portion of the land. In his 1788 will, Benjamin left William virtually none of his wealth, except some nearly worthless territory in Nova Scotia and some property already in William's possession. He stated in the will that the way William "acted against me in the late war, which is of public notoriety, will account for my leaving him no more of an estate he endeavoured to deprive me of." William died on 17 November 1813, in London, and was buried in London's St Pancras Old Church churchyard.

== Legacy and honors ==
- Franklin Township in Bergen County, New Jersey, was named in William's honor, as was the borough of Franklin Lakes.

== In popular culture ==
William Franklin is referenced in a humorous dialogue exchange in the stage musical 1776. During a session of the Continental Congress, John Hancock asks Benjamin Franklin if he has heard any news from his son, whom Hancock calls the Royal Governor of New Jersey. To this Dr. Franklin responds, "As that title might suggest, sir, we are not in touch at the present time." Later when a new congressional delegation from New Jersey arrives, the leader of the delegation, Rev. John Witherspoon, informs Dr. Franklin of William's arrest and transferral to Connecticut. Upon learning that William is unharmed, Dr. Franklin contemptuously answers, "Tell me, why did they arrest the little bastard?"

William Franklin is referenced in Lin-Manuel Miranda's "Ben Franklin's Song", a supplement to the musical Hamilton. The song, sung from Benjamin Franklin's perspective, references his son William's imprisonment with the lyrics:

One pain that lingers, the hitch in my stride
Is my son back at home who I could not guide
Who sits all alone in a prison cell on the wrong side
Stands against our young nation.

Josh Lucas voices William in Ken Burns's documentary about Benjamin Franklin.

William Franklin is also referenced occasionally in the Apple TV+ series Franklin by several characters, including by his son, William Temple Franklin, as well as Benjamin Franklin himself.

Franklin is portrayed by Daniel Betts in 2024 drama film Here.

== See also ==
- Burlington Company
- Proprietary House

== Bibliography ==
- Epstein, Daniel Mark (2017). The Loyal Son: The War in Ben Franklin's House. Description & preview. Ballantine. Kirkus Review & Publishers Weekly Review
- Ford, Paul Leicester (1889), Who Was the Mother of Franklin's Son?: An Historical Conundrum, Hitherto given up—Now Partly Answered, Brooklyn.
- Gerlach, Larry R. William Franklin: New Jersey's Last Royal Governor (1976), a scholarly biography
- Hart, Charles Henry (1911), "Who Was the Mother of Franklin's Son: An Inquiry demonstrating that she was Deborah Read, wife of Benjamin Franklin", Pennsylvania Magazine of History and Biography, 35 (3), PSU: 308–14, archived from the original on 6 June 2013.
- Randall, Willard Sterne (1984), A Little Revenge: Benjamin Franklin & His Son, Little, Brown & Co.
- Randall, Willard Sterne. "Franklin, William"; American National Biography Online 2000.
- Skemp, Sheila (1990), William Franklin: Son of a Patriot, Servant of a King, Oxford University Press.
- Schlenther, Boyd Stanley. "Franklin, William (1730/31–1813)", Oxford Dictionary of National Biography Oxford University Press, 2004; online edn, Jan 2008 Boyd Stanley accessed 1 Oct 2017 doi:10.1093/ref:odnb/62971
- Skemp, Sheila L. "Benjamin Franklin, Patriot, and William Franklin, Loyalist." Pennsylvania History 65.1 (1998): 35–45.
- Skemp, Sheila L. "William Franklin: His Father's Son." Pennsylvania Magazine of History and Biography 109.2 (1985): 145–178.

== Additional reading ==
- Long Stanley, Wendy (2019). The Power to Deny: A Woman of the Revolution Novel. Carmenta Publishing. ISBN 978-1-951747-00-8.

Government offices
| Preceded by Josiah Hardy | Governor of New Jersey; Last Colonial Governor; 1763–1776; Last Royal Governor | Succeeded by William Livingston; First Revolutionary Governor |
