= Lord Charles Montagu =

Charles Montagu

29th Governor of South Carolina
- In office June 12, 1766 – May 1768
- Monarch: George III
- Preceded by: William Bull II
- Succeeded by: William Bull II
- In office October 30, 1768 – July 31, 1769
- Monarch: George III
- Preceded by: William Bull II
- Succeeded by: William Bull II
- In office September 15, 1771 – March 6, 1773
- Monarch: George III
- Preceded by: William Bull II
- Succeeded by: William Bull II

Personal details
- Born: 1741
- Died: 3 February 1784 (aged 42–43) Guysborough, Nova Scotia (community)
- Spouse: Elizabeth Balmer (m. 1765)
- Parent(s): Robert Montagu, 3rd Duke of Manchester; Harriet Dunch

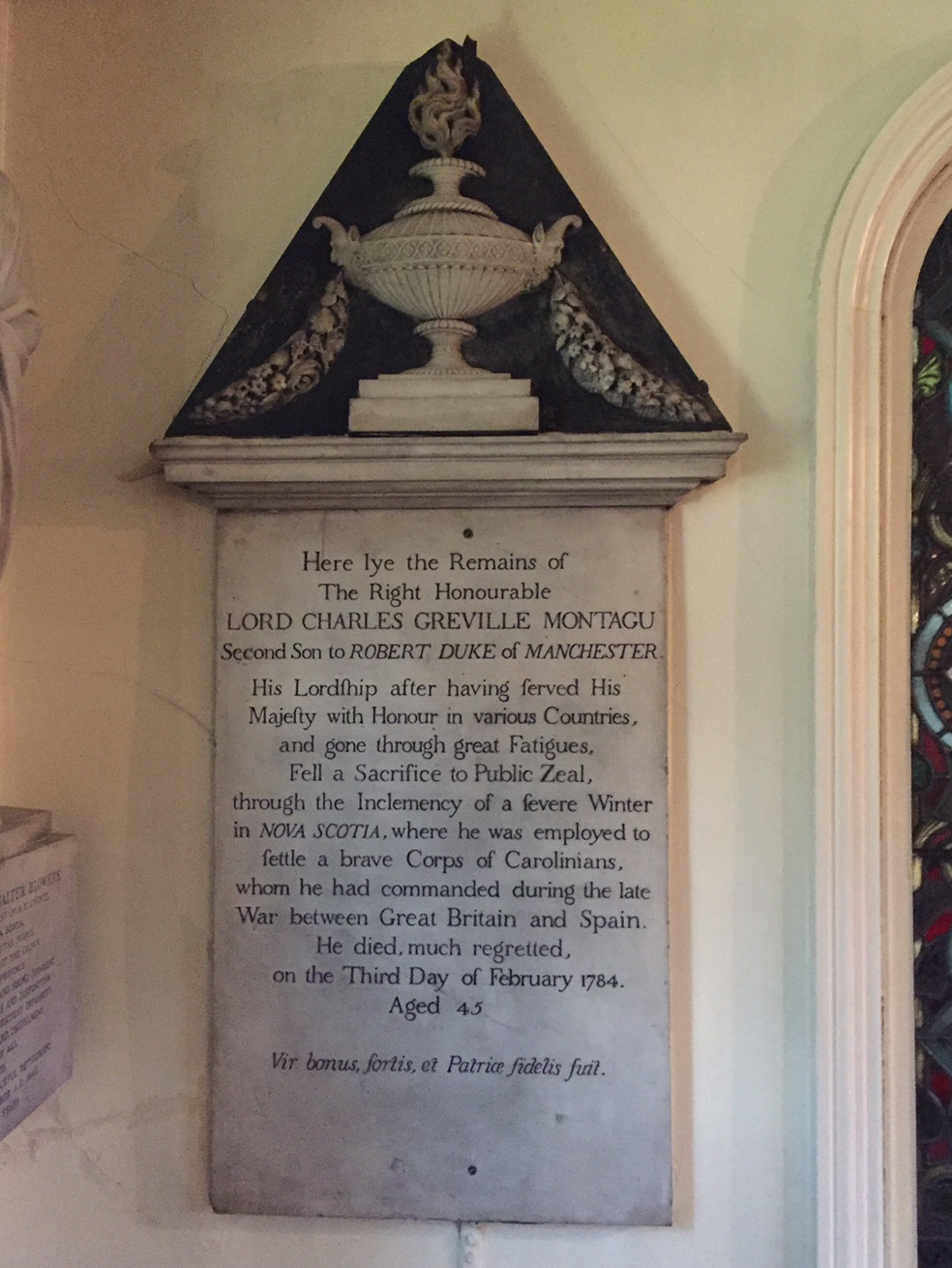
Lord Charles Greville Montagu, St. Paul's Church (Halifax), Nova Scotia

Lord Charles Greville Montagu (1741 – 3 February 1784) was the last Royal Governor of the Province of South Carolina from 1766 to 1773, with William Bull II serving terms in 1768 and 1769–1771. He also was the commander of the Duke of Cumberland's Regiment during the American Revolution.

== Biography ==
Charles was the second son of Robert Montagu, 3rd Duke of Manchester. Charles attended Oxford University in 1759 and married Ms. Elizabeth Balmer in 1765. He was also a Member of Parliament for Huntingdonshire from 1762 to 1765.

His attempts to enforce the 1765 Stamp Act made him unpopular with the local colonials as governor, and led to his departure during the American Revolution. He tried to be favorable with the colonials and American rebels, having pardoned some of the Regulators. However, it was not enough.

During the American Revolutionary War, Montagu began recruiting American prisoners for the Duke of Cumberland's Regiment to fight for the British war with Spanish forces, who were on the colonists side. Charles was captured recruiting soldiers on British prison ships in New York but was released by General Nathanael Greene. Charles even tried to convince American General William Moultrie to join his regiment, but failed. Charles and his recruits made up the Duke of Cumberland's army regiment, and the outfit was discharged in 1783.

Charles made it to Halifax, Nova Scotia, with his family (and Joseph Marshall). His Duke of Cumberland's Regiment settled Guysborough. He died soon afterwards and is buried in the crypt of St Paul's Church in Halifax. His tomb states that he died on 3 Feb, 1784, still in his 40s. He was remembered as a good and brave man, who was loyal to his King and Country.

== Legacy ==
- namesake of Montagu Street, Charleston, South Carolina
- Montagu's regiment is the namesake of Cumberland Street, Charleston, South Carolina

== See also ==
- List of colonial governors of South Carolina
- Nova Scotia in the American Revolution
