= Duke of Cumberland's Regiment =

- Active: 1781-1783
- Country: Great Britain
- Allegiance: Great Britain
- Branch: British provincial unit
- Type: infantry (auxiliary troops)
- Size: Battalions: 1st Battalion; 2nd Battalion 5 companies (500 men)
- Part of: Governor Lord Charles Montagu
- Garrison/HQ: Province of South Carolina; Colony of Jamaica; Province of New York
- Engagements: American Revolutionary War: Never saw combat

Commanders
- Notable commanders: Governor Lord Charles Montagu; Captain Gideon White

The Duke of Cumberland's Regiment, also known as Montagu's Corps, South Carolina Rangers, and the Loyal American Rangers, was a British Loyalist provincial unit raised from American colonists and rebel prisoners by the former British Royal Governor of the Province of South Carolina, Lord Charles Montagu as well as in the colony of the Province of New York. They never saw combat action and were disbanded in 1783.

== American Revolution ==
Lord Montagu raised 5 companies of 100 men each in Charleston and Camden, South Carolina as well as African slaves for service in Jamaica or elsewhere, at the behest of the Governor of Jamaica, John Dalling. Montagu recruited rebel prisoners who agree to fight the Spanish - not their fellow Americans. The regiment was involved in a skirmish. In August 1781, the regiment sailed for Jamaica and spent the war there. During their time in Jamaica, the regiment had a large amount of soldiers being admitted to the regimental hospital due to sickness. The second Battalion and Lord Montagu arrived in New York on 4 April 1783 to recruit for the Battalion. The Duke of Cumberland's Regiment was disbanded in Jamaica on 24 October 1783.

== Resettlement in Nova Scotia ==
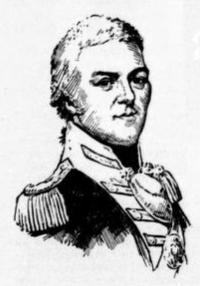
Captain Gideon White, Nova Scotia

Captain Gideon White's company was allowed to settle in Nova Scotia, settling at Shelburne, Nova Scotia. Sgt. Nathan Pushee settled at Chedabucto (present-day Guysborough), eventually founding present-day Amherst, Nova Scotia. A number of former American rebels who joined the regiment, returned to the newly independent United States to apply for military pensions.

== Notable members ==
- Captain Gideon White
- Marcus Rainsford
- Lord Charles Montagu

== See also ==
- Nova Scotia in the American Revolution

== Links ==
- Duke of Cumberland Regiment - History
