= Governor Boone =

Governor Boone may refer to:

- Charles Boone (governor) (died 1735), Governor of Bombay from 1715 to 1722
- Thomas Boone (governor) (1730–1812), 7th Royal Governor of New Jersey and the 28th Royal Governor of South Carolina
