= Gideon White =

Canadian politician

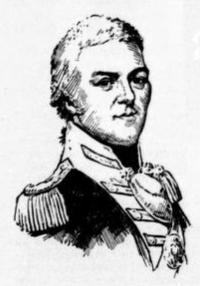

Member of the Nova Scotia House of Assembly for Barrington
- In office 1790–1793
- Preceded by: Joseph Aplin

Personal details
- Born: March 1753 Plymouth, Province of Massachusetts Bay
- Died: September 30, 1833 (aged 80) Shelburne, Nova Scotia
- Spouse: Deborah Whitworth (m. 1787)
- Relations: Edward Winslow (cousin)

Military service
- Allegiance: Kingdom of Great Britain

Gideon White (March 1753 – September 30, 1833) was an American-born military officer who served as a captain in the Duke of Cumberland's Regiment and then became a merchant, judge and political figure in Nova Scotia. He represented Barrington Township in the Nova Scotia House of Assembly from 1790 to 1793.

== Early life ==
He was born in Plymouth, Massachusetts, the son of Captain Gideon White and Joanna Howland, both descendants of the Pilgrims.

== Career ==
White was in Nova Scotia in 1776. In September that same year, he was captured by an American privateer and taken back to Massachusetts where he was placed under house arrest. White went to Liverpool, Nova Scotia in the winter of the following year. After trading in the Caribbean, he established himself as a merchant in Charleston, South Carolina. In 1782, he went to New York City and served as a captain in the Duke of Cumberland's Regiment. White settled at Shelburne, Nova Scotia with other members of that retired regiment in 1784, retiring on half pay from his military service.

He served as a justice of the peace for Halifax County and then Shelburne County, also serving as custos rotulorum, major in the militia, customs collector, justice in the Inferior Court of Common Pleas and as commissioner of bridges and roads.

He was elected to the assembly in a by-election held after Joseph Aplin left the province in 1789, taking his seat March 1, 1790.

== Personal life ==
In 1787, he married Deborah Whitworth. White died in Shelburne, Nova Scotia at the age of 80. He was a cousin of Edward Winslow.

== See also ==
- Nova Scotia in the American Revolution
