= Thomas Boone =

Thomas Boone may refer to:

- Thomas Boone (governor) (1730–1812), colonial governor of South Carolina and New Jersey
- Thomas Boone (JAG), a recurring character on the American television series JAG

== See also ==
- Thomas Boone Pickens (1928–2019), American financier
