= Governor Broughton =

Governor Broughton may refer to:

- J. Melville Broughton (1888–1949), 60th Governor of North Carolina
- Thomas Broughton (acting governor) (1668–1737), 28th Governor of the Province of South Carolina
