= Governor West =

Governor West may refer to:

- Caleb Walton West (1844–1909), Governor of Utah Territory from 1886 to 1888 and 1893 to 1896
- Francis West (1586–1634), Deputy Governor of the Colony and Dominion of Virginia from 1627 to 1629
- John C. West (1922–2004), 109th Governor of South Carolina
- John West (governor) (1590–1659), colonial Governor of Virginia from 1635 to 1637
- John West, 1st Earl De La Warr (1693–1766), Governor of Gravesend and Tilbury from 1747 to 1752 and of Guernsey from 1752 to 1766
- Joseph West (politician) (fl. 1669–1684), English-born governor of South Carolina
- Martin West (colonial administrator) (1804–1849), Governor of Natal from 1845 to 1849
- Oswald West (1873–1960), 14th Governor of Oregon
