= William Bull II =

American politician (1710–1791)

24th (Acting) Governor of South Carolina
- In office 5 April 1760 – 22 December 1761
- Monarchs: George II; George III
- Preceded by: Thomas Pownall
- Succeeded by: Thomas Boone (governor)
- In office 14 May 1764 – 12 June 1766
- Monarch: George III
- Preceded by: Thomas Boone (governor)
- Succeeded by: Lord Charles Greville Montagu
- In office May 1768 – 30 October 1768
- Monarch: George III
- Preceded by: Lord Charles Greville Montagu
- Succeeded by: Lord Charles Greville Montagu
- In office 31 July 1769 – 15 September 1771
- Monarch: George III
- Preceded by: Lord Charles Greville Montagu
- Succeeded by: Lord Charles Greville Montagu
- In office 6 March 1773 – 18 June 1775
- Monarch: George III
- Preceded by: Lord Charles Greville Montagu
- Succeeded by: Lord William Campbell

3rd Lieutenant Governor of South Carolina
- In office March 21, 1755 – March 26, 1776
- Governor: James Glen William Lyttelton; Thomas Boone; Lord Charles Montagu Lord William Campbell
- Preceded by: William Bull I
- Succeeded by: Henry Laurens (as Vice President of South Carolina

Personal details
- Born: September 24, 1710 Charleston County, South Carolina, US
- Died: July 4, 1791 (aged 80) London, England, UK
- Resting place: Old Sheldon Church Ruins

William Bull II (September 24, 1710 – July 4, 1791) was a landowner who was for many years (1759–1775) the lieutenant governor of the province of South Carolina and served as acting governor on five occasions. A Loyalist, he left the colony in 1782 when British troops were evacuated at the end of the American Revolutionary War, and he died in London.

William (Guilielmus) Bull matriculated at the University of Leiden in the Netherlands 10 October 1732. He received his Medical Doctor degree from the University of Leiden on 13 April 1734. The title description of his thesis is: Dissertatio medica inauguralis de colica pictonum. Quam ... pro gradu Doctoratus, summisque in Medicina honoribus & privilegiis rite ac legitime consequendis, eruditorum examini submittit Guilielmus Bull ... ad diem 18. Augusti 1734. hora locoque solitis. - Lugduni Batavorum : apud Gerardum Potvliet, 1734. - 19,[1]p.; 4to.

On title-page he is described as "Anglus ex Carolina." Dedicated to his father, William Bull, King's Counsel of South Carolina. In the thesis, he makes reference to "Townium Anglium qui ad colicam refert." Born in South Carolina, 1710, he is said to have been the first from the American Continent to graduate at Leyden. But Roland Cotton (born Hampton, N.H., August 29, 1674) received his Ph.D. at the University of Harderwijk in the Netherlands on October 8, 1697.
