= Governor Morton =

Governor Morton may refer to:

- Joseph Morton (governor) (died 1721), Governor of the Province of Carolina from 1682 to 1684, and in 1686
- Julius Sterling Morton (1832–1902), Acting Governor of Nebraska in 1861
- Levi P. Morton (1824–1920), 31st Governor of New York
- Marcus Morton (1784–1864), 16th and 18th Governor of Massachusetts
- Oliver P. Morton (1823–1877), 14th Governor of Indiana
