= Robert Daniell =

English colonial administrator (1646–1718)

His Excellency Robert Daniell
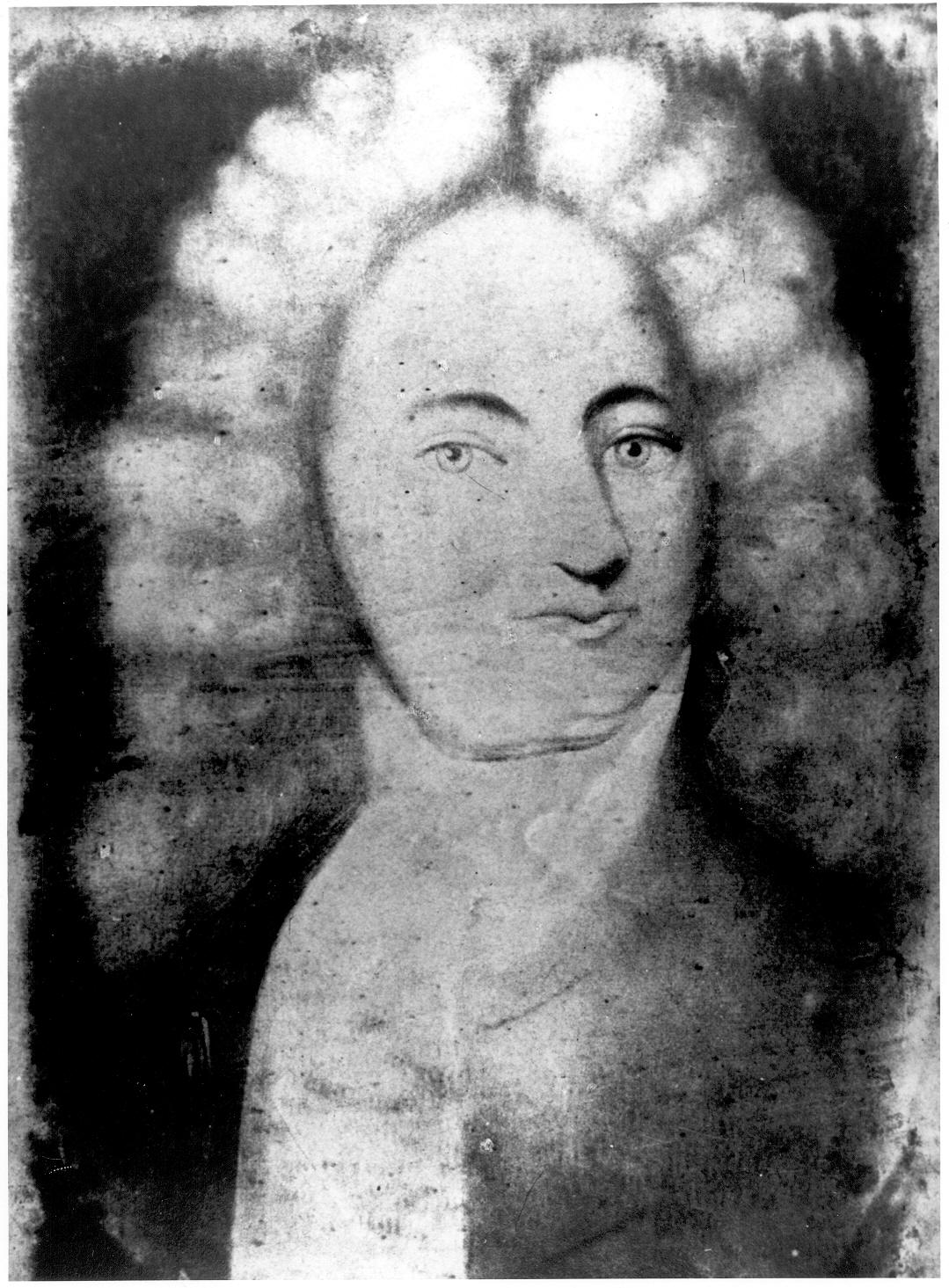

18th Governor of South Carolina
- In office 1716–1717
- Monarch: George I
- Preceded by: Charles Craven
- Succeeded by: Robert Johnson

3rd Deputy Governor of North Carolina
- In office 1704–1705
- Preceded by: Henderson Walker (Acting)
- Succeeded by: Thomas Cary

Personal details
- Born: April 20, 1646 England
- Died: May 1, 1718 (aged 71–72) Daniel Island (present-day Charleston, South Carolina)
- Resting place: Charleston, South Carolina
- Spouse(s): Dorothy Chamberlain; Martha Wainwright
- Children: 5

Military service
- Branch/service: provincial militia
- Years of service: 1669-1715
- Rank: colonel
- Battles/wars: Siege of St. Augustine (1702); Tuscarora War; Yamasee War

Robert Daniell (20 April 1646 – 1 May 1718) was an English-born merchant, sea captain, militia officer and colonial administrator who served as the governor of South Carolina from 1716 to 1717.

Daniell was born on 20 April 1646 in England. He arrived in Charles Town, South Carolina in 1669 as captain of the English ship The Daniell. In 1682, Daniell was commissioned as a major in the Goose Creek militia. By 1691, he was promoted to the rank of colonel under King William III. In 1702, Daniell led colonial forces in James Moore Sr.'s expedition to St. Augustine, Florida, which unsuccessfully besieged the Castillo de San Marcos. He later led provincial forces in the 1711 Tuscarora War and the 1715 Yamasee War.

Daniell served as deputy governor of the Province of North Carolina from 1704 to 1705, and as governor of the Province of South Carolina from 1716 to 1717. He also owned several slave plantations.

== Legacy ==
- Daniel Island in Charleston, of which he was an early owner, is named for him.
