= Governor Gibbs =

Governor Gibbs may refer to:

- A. C. Gibbs (1825–1886), 2nd Governor of Oregon
- Humphrey Gibbs (1902–1990), Governor of Southern Rhodesia from 1959 to 1969
- William C. Gibbs (1787–1871), 10th Governor of Rhode Island

== See also ==
- Robert Gibbes (1644–1715), 20th Colonial Governor of South Carolina
