= Marcus Rainsford =

British army officer and author (c.1758–1817)

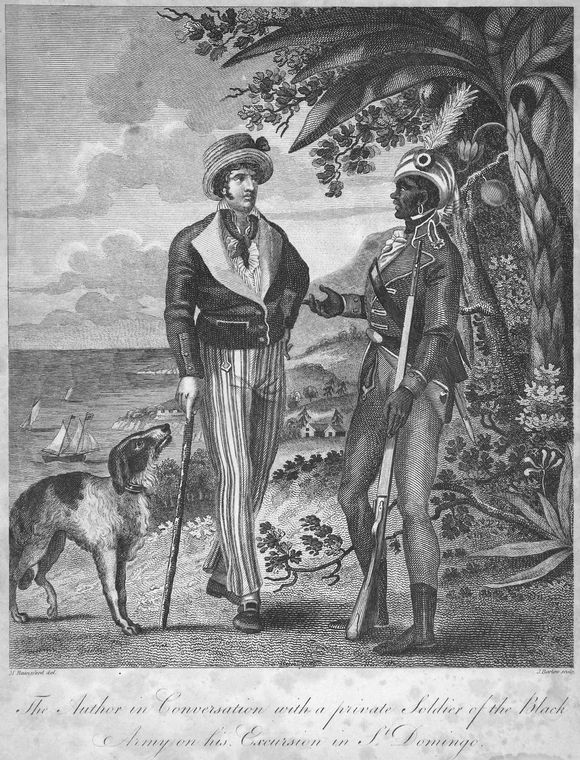
- Rainsford (left)
- Born: c. 1758; Kildare, Dublin, Ireland
- Died: 4 November 1817 (aged 58–59); London, England
- Resting place: St Giles in the Fields, London, England
- Education: Trinity College Dublin TCD
- Occupations: Soldier, author, historian
- Known for: Author on the Haitian Revolution

Signature
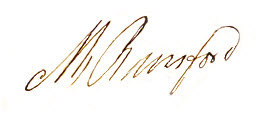

Captain Marcus Rainsford (c. 1758 – 4 November 1817) was a British Army officer who fought in the Battle of Camden in 1780, during the American Revolutionary War. He published An Historical Account of the Black Empire of Hayti, London, in 1805.

== Biography ==
Rainsford was a younger son of Edward Rainsford of Sallins, Kildare, born c. 1750. He was educated at Trinity College Dublin and obtained an MA in 1773. He joined the Irish Volunteers in 1779.

He obtained a commission and saw service in the 105th regiment, commanded by Francis, lord Rawdon (afterwards second) Earl of Moira, during the American War of Independence. He took part in Siege of Charleston and the Battle of Camden in 1780. He then went to Jamaica with the Duke of Cumberland's Regiment.

In 1794 he served under the Duke of York in the Netherlands, during the Flanders Campaign and was afterwards employed in raising black troops in the West Indies.

In 1799 Rainsford visited St. Domingo, and had an interview with Toussaint L'Ouverture. He was subsequently arrested and condemned to death as a spy, but was reprieved and eventually set at liberty. Rainsford died in November 1817 and is buried in St Giles in the Fields, London, England.

== Works ==
- Rainsford.A Memoir of Transactions that took place in St. Domingo in the Spring of 1799 (London, 1802; 2nd edit. as St. Domingo; or an Historical, Political, and Military Sketch of the Black Republic, 1802).
- Rainsford. An Historical Account of the Black Empire of Hayti, London, 1805
- Rainsford. A poem in heroic couplets, The Revolution; or Britain Delivered, London, 1801 (2nd edit.).
