= William Bull (governor) =

British politician in Colonial America (1683-1755)

24th Governor of South Carolina
- In office November 22, 1737 – December 17, 1743
- Monarch: George II
- Preceded by: Thomas Broughton
- Succeeded by: James Glen

2nd Lieutenant Governor of South Carolina
- In office December 23, 1738 – March 21, 1755
- Governor: James Glen
- Preceded by: Thomas Broughton
- Succeeded by: William Bull II

Personal details
- Born: 1683 Charleston, South Carolina
- Died: March 21, 1755 (aged 71–72) Sheldon, South Carolina

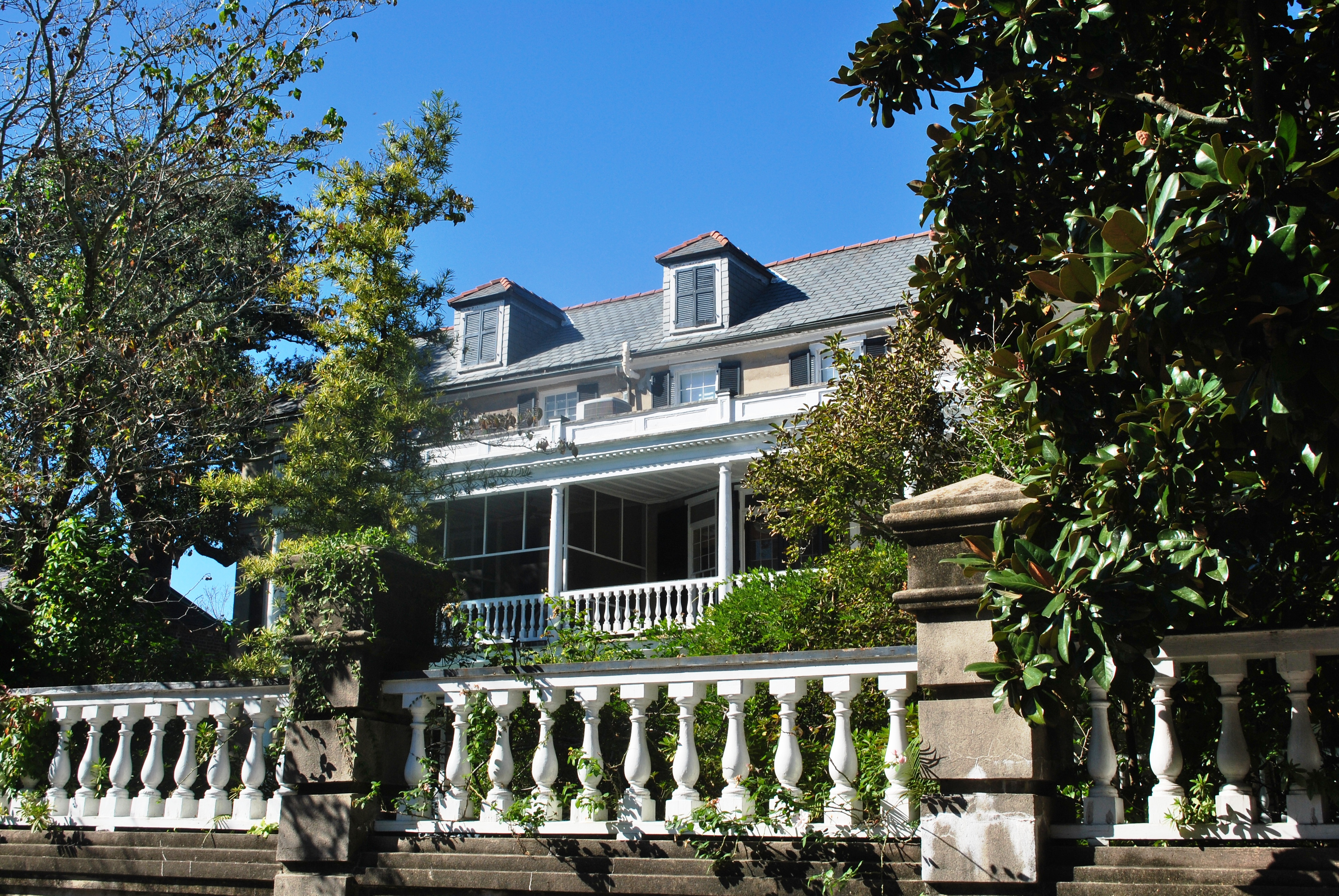
William Bull's House, Charleston

William Bull (1683 – March 21, 1755) was a colonial American landowner and politician in the Province of South Carolina.

He was a captain in the Tuscarora War and then a colonel in the Yamasee War before he became the Commissioner of Indian Affairs in 1721. He served on the governor's council and was the lieutenant governor under James Glen from 1738 to 1755 and acting governor from 1738 to 1744. In 1733, he assisted James Oglethorpe in the founding of the new Province of Georgia, laying out the town of Savannah, whose Bull Street is named for him. His father, Stephen Bull, was Lord Ashley's deputy and one of the leaders of the expedition that came from England in 1670 and settled Charles Town.

He was married to Mary Quintyne and his descendants include a son, also named William Bull, who was also a South Carolina acting governor, as well as William Henry Drayton and Charles Drayton, sons of his daughter Charlotta Bull and John Drayton. A monument to Governor Bull (c. 1791) is located at Ashley Hall Plantation, listed on the National Register of Historic Places in 1975.

== Tuscarora War ==
During the Tuscarora War William Bull took part in John Barnwell's expedition into North Carolina. Bull was made captain of a company of Native American warriors from the Watteree, Pedee, Weneaw, Cape Feare, Hoopeng and Wareper tribes, totaling 117 in number. During the march from the Pedee River to the Cape Feare River Barnwell split his forces in two and placed about 200 men under the command of Captain Bull. Upon reuniting he took part in the assault on Narhonte's head town and his company suffered 1 dead and 6 wounded while his company took 16 scalps. After taking the fort, they marched to Tonarooka where they camped while Barnwell searched for boats to cross a branch of the Neuse River. While camping at Tonarooka Captain Bull's entire company deserted along with a good portion of another company, leaving only the Yamasee warriors to continue Barnwell's expedition.

== Governor ==
In 1737 Thomas Broughton's time as acting governor of South Carolina came to an end and James Glen took his place but a dispute over his salary kept him from arriving in the colony until 1743. William Bull, who was Lt. Governor at the time, served in Glen's place until his arrival. His time in office was marked by the dual threats of a war with the Spanish in Florida and a Native American uprising. The first major push to settle the deep interior of South Carolina had taken place in the 1730s and brought with it renewed tensions over land rights between the colonists and the Native Americans. Change was also happening within the government of South Carolina as the Commons House of Assembly was becoming more influential. Bull responded by creating a close working relationship with Charles Pinckney, who was the Speaker of the Assembly and Bull's protege.

== War of Jenkins' Ear ==
In 1739, two years into Bull's time as governor, the War of Jenkins' Ear broke out and put South Carolina in direct conflict with Spanish-controlled Florida. Traditionally, the governor of South Carolina was responsible for defending the southern colonies against foreign threats and received an extra 1,000 pounds in salary for fulfilling that role. With the creation of the Georgia colony, that role had been moved to the Georgian governor, James Oglethorpe. That change had two effects on William Bull; the first was that it made him the acting governor when James Glen, who had been appointed to that position, stayed in England to dispute the matter. The second effect this change had was that it forced Bull to watch from the sidelines as Oglethorpe waged war on his behalf.

Oglethorpe moved to attack St. Augustine, in Florida, and South Carolina supported his effort. The campaign was a failure, and South Carolinians were highly critical of the way in which Oglethorpe had managed his forces by accusing him of bungling a siege of that city. With Oglethorpe out of favor with South Carolina and St. Augustine still firmly in Spanish hands, the southern colonies were now left vulnerable and concerns ranged from a potential Spanish-backed slave uprising to an assault on Port Royal, South Carolina. The Spanish finally struck in 1742 with an assault on St. Simon's Island, in Georgia, involving 3,000 attackers, who were ultimately defeated.

== Slave Codes ==
In the aftermath of the Stono Rebellion, Lieutenant Governor William Bull wrote to the Board of Trade and Plantations to inform them about the revolt. In his letter, he describes the "daring" actions of the determined Stono rebels, as well as the measures the colonial militia took to subdue the rebellion. He also proposed for the colony to employ Native American slave hunters to track down runaway slaves. In 1740, in the aftermath of the rebellion, the Commons House of Assembly of South Carolina introduced a comprehensive slave code in the hope of regulating that institution.

== Priber Incident ==
Towards the end of Bull's time as acting governor, an incident that had been building up for some time finally came to a head. In 1734, a man named Christian Gottlieb Priber arrived in South Carolina and began to live among the Cherokee. His vision was to create a town called Paradise, which would be located deep within the South Carolina frontier and would serve as a refuge for criminals, debtors, and runaway slaves. He instructed the Native Americans on the use of scales or weights in dealing with dishonest traders, and he dreamed of forming the southern tribes into a confederacy. Priber's presence among the Native Americans began to exacerbate tensions between South Carolina the Creeks and Cherokees and so in 1743, Bull's last year in office, Priber was arrested.

Preceded by Thomas Broughton	29th Governor of South Carolina; 1737-1743	Succeeded by James Glen
