= Charles Craven =

Carolina governor

21st Governor of South Carolina
- In office 19 March 1712 – 23 April 1716
- Monarchs: Anne; George I
- Preceded by: Robert Gibbes
- Succeeded by: Robert Daniell

Personal details
- Born: 1682 England
- Died: 27 December 1754 (aged 71–72) Berkshire, Great Britain
- Resting place: Speen, Berkshire, England
- Spouse: Elizabeth Staples
- Children: John Craven Martha Craven and Jane Craven
- Occupation: Administrator
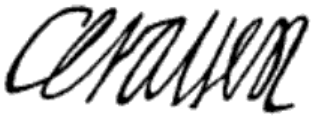
- Signature

Charles Craven (1682 – 27 December 1754) was the son of Sir William Craven and Margaret Clapham. He held the office of Governor of Carolina between 1711 and 1716.

== Biography ==
He was secretary of the proprietors of Carolina Colony. In February 1711 he was appointed governor of the Colony, and in March 1712 arrived in Charleston to begin filling his charge, which he held until April 1716, when he returned to England.

During 1712 he was ordered to sound Port Royal River, and it is then that it is supposed that he founded Beaufort. Three years later all of the Indians from Cape Fear to St. Mary's River combined under the leadership of the Yemassees for the purpose of destroying the colony on Ashley River. Governor Craven at once proclaimed martial law, laid an embargo on all ships to prevent the departure of men or provisions, and at the head of 1,200 men, part of whom were people of African descent, met the Indians in a series of desperate encounters and finally drove them beyond the Savannah.

In 1710 a speck of civil war appeared in Charleston, when two claimants to the office of acting governor, on the death of Tynte, the successor of Johnson, disputed for the honor. A compromise was effected, by referring the case to the proprietors for a decision. They wisely discarded both candidates, and appointed Charles Craven, brother of one of the proprietors, governor of the province. Under his administration the colony prospered, settlements extended, and the power of a dangerous Indian confederacy against the Carolinas was effectually broken. The proprietors appointed Charles Craven, who then held their commission as secretary, to be governor. He was proclaimed in form, and took upon him the administration. During his government, the province was involved in two sharp contests with the Indians. One in North Carolina with the Tuscaroras, and another much more distressing with the Yamasee, which were ably and successfully conducted by the governor, as shall be related in its proper place. On his departure for England, in 1716, he appointed Robert Daniel, deputy governor. In the year following, Robert Johnson, son of Sir Nathaniel Johnson, succeeded to the office of governor. He was the last who held that office under the authority of the proprietors.

Charles Craven was married to Elizabeth Staples and they had 3 children John, Martha & Jane

William Gilmore Simms's 1835 novel, The Yemassee, is a fictionalized account of the Indian war, and Craven is the central character.

== See also ==
- List of colonial governors of South Carolina
