= Charles Towne, North Carolina =

First Barbadian Colony in the Carolinas

Charles Towne
- Colony of England
- 1663–1667
- 1660s map showing the location of Charles Towne on the Cape Fear River
- Area
  - Coordinates: 34°8′6.06″N 77°58′5.68″W
- Population
  - 1664: approx. 30−50
  - 1667: approx. 20−40
- Government
- Governor
  - 1665-1667: William Drummond
- Historical era: Stuart Restoration
  - Established: 1663
  - Evacuated: 1667
  - Disestablished: 1667
- Today part of: Brunswick County, North Carolina, United States

Charles Towne was the first English colony in the Carolinas, founded by Barbadians on the Cape Fear River, near the location that later became Brunswick Town. It was established and abandoned in the 1660s in favor for a settlement further south, that later became Charleston, South Carolina.

== History ==
After William Hilton Jr. explored along the coast of the Carolinas in 1662, some New England adventurers entered Cape Fear River, purchased a tract of land from the Indians on Old Town Creek (about halfway between Wilmington and Brunswick), and settled there in what is present-day Brunswick County.

The colony did not prosper long; the local Indians lifted their hatchets against them, and in less than three months the settlement was abandoned temporarily. In 1664 several planters from Barbados purchased of the Indians a tract of land, 32 miles square near the abandoned settlement. They asked the lords proprietor for a confirmation of their purchase and a separate charter of government. John Yeamans, the son of a cavalier and a Barbados planter, was appointed governor at the solicitation of the purchasers. Hilton was again sent to explore the region, this time by men from Barbados. He entered the Cape Fear region in October 1663 and left in December, evidently just before the New Englanders arrived. John Vassall of Barbados financed and led the first permanent settlers to the lower Cape Fear, landing in May 1664, and by November had established Charles Towne, 20 miles upstream on the west bank of the Charles River (Clarendon River at that time, later named the Cape Fear River). Vassall had not reached a satisfactory agreement with the lords proprietor. Instead they signed an agreement in January 1665 with William Yeamans of Port Royale.

Sir John Yeamans, William's father, was appointed "governor of our Country of Clarendon neare southerly ..." In October, John Yeamans stopped at Charles Towne on his way to Port Royale and found the colonists in desperate need of supplies. He sent a ship to Virginia to relieve this need, but the ship wrecked on the return trip. Sir John left in December and never returned. War with the Indians and the indifference of the lords proprietor led to the migration of settlers out of the Cape Fear area, and by the end of 1667 the site was deserted. Further settlement was not attempted for 50 years because of the closing of the Carolina land office by the lords proprietor, the hostility of the Cape Fear Indians, and the presence of pirates.

In August 1667 there was a major hurricane, "The Dreadful Hurricane of 1667", that hit the entire East Coast. It severely damaged all the structures of the first Charles Towne. The settlers had had enough, so they loaded up and left, with most returning to Barbados, Virginia, or the Albemarle Sound.

== Legacy ==
The site of the 17th century settlement is located today near the grounds of Orton Plantation in Brunswick County, North Carolina. The area is located on Old Town Creek, and the site is called Old Town in reference to the settlement and nearby Brunswick Town, another colonial settlement that was short lived.
