= John Yeamans =

English colonial administrator and planter

Sir John Yeamans
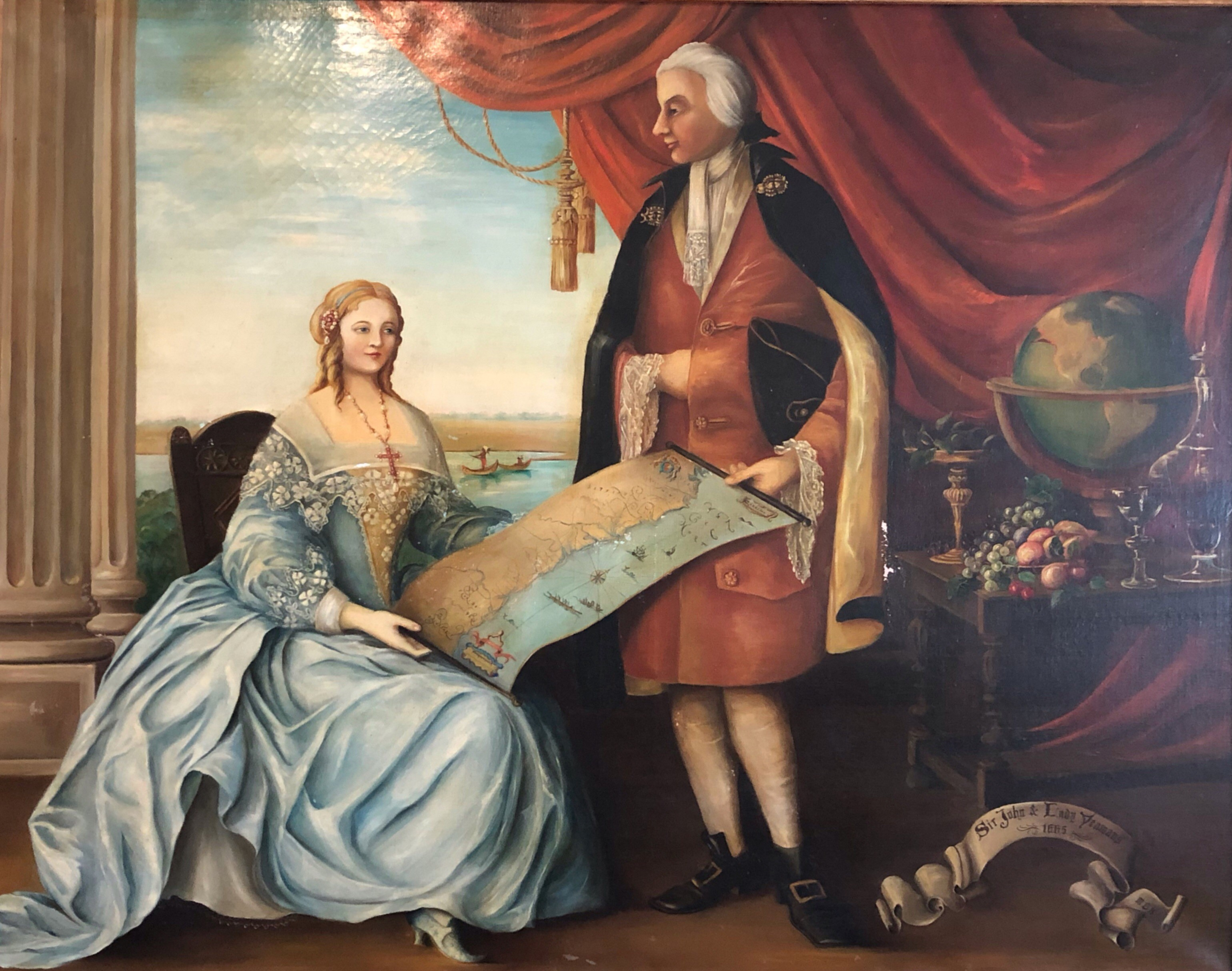
- A portrait of Yeamans and his wife

Governor of Carolina
- In office 19 April 1672 – 13 August 1674
- Monarch: James II & VII
- Preceded by: Joseph West
- Succeeded by: Joseph West

Personal details
- Born: 28 February 1611 Bristol, England
- Died: August 1674 (aged 63) Charleston, Carolina, British America
- Spouse(s): Limp; Margaret Berringer
- Occupation: colonial administrator

Sir John Yeamans, 1st Baronet (bapt. 28 February 1611 – 1674) was an English colonial administrator and planter who served as Governor of Carolina from 1672 to 1674. Contemporary descriptions of Yeamans described him as "a pirate ashore."

== Life ==
Baptised on 28 February 1611 in Redcliffe, Bristol, England, Sir John Yeamans was a younger son of John Yeamans, a brewer, and his wife Blanche Germain. The younger Yeamans was a colonel in the Royalist army during the English Civil War.

In about 1650 Yeamans migrated to Barbados, and within a decade he had become a major landholder there (he had held land in Barbados since 1638) a colonel of the colonial militia, judge of a local court of common pleas, and by July 1660 he was serving on the Barbadian council.

== Carolina ==
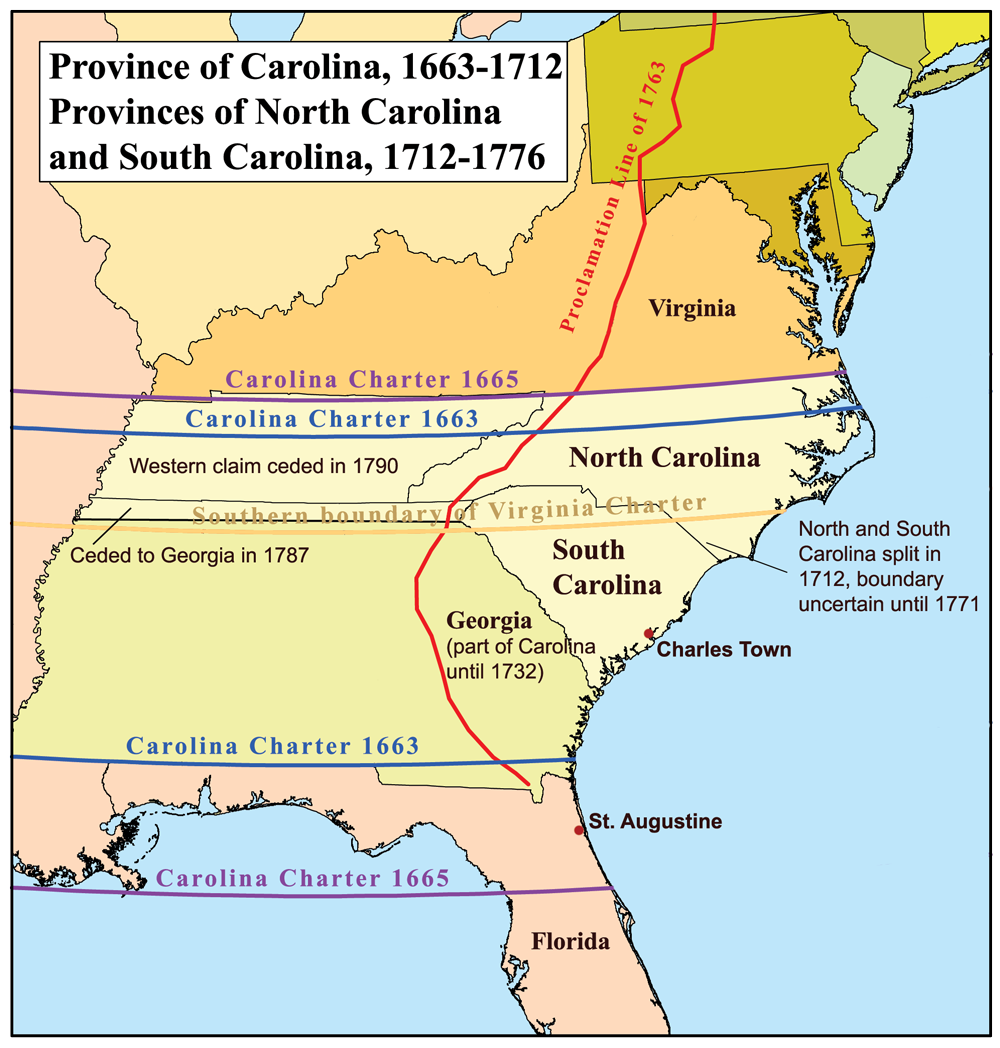
A map of the Province of Carolina

In the deteriorating economic conditions of the 1660s and 1670s many Barbadian planters sought better opportunities. In 1663 a number of planters in Barbados made arrangements with the proprietors of Carolina for establishing a colony at Cape Fear called Charles Towne. The Lords Proprietors, by the exercise of their influence at the English court, secured a baronetcy for Yeamans, which was conferred on him 12 January 1665, and on 11 January 1665 they appointed him governor of the new colony, with a jurisdiction extending from Cape Fear to San Mateo.

The region was named Clarendon County. Yeamans was also instructed to explore the coast south of Cape Fear. He sailed with three vessels from Barbados in January 1665, and reached Cape Fear, but sustained heavy loss on the way from rough weather. Accordingly, he soon returned to Barbados, leaving the management of the new settlement to a deputy, Captain Robert Sandford (whose lieutenant was Joseph Woory, Yeamans's nephew). (Note: When in 1667 Locke drew up for Carolina a fantastic paper constitution entitled the "fundamental constitution", which was never exactly applied, Yeamans was created a landgrave (Doyle 1900, p. 307).) However the colonists abandoned Clarendon by the autumn of 1667.

In 1669 another attempt at colonisation was made. Three ships of settlers were sent to Port Royal Island from the British Isles calling first at Barbados. Instructed by the proprietors to name a governor Yeamans named himself and joined the expedition until it reached Bermuda. In Bermuda he appointed the elderly William Sayle in his place and abruptly returned to Barbados. The expedition continued and successfully founded South Carolina's first permanent English settlement in April 1670.

Sayle died in March 1671. Before his death he nominated as his successor the deputy governor, Joseph West, and this appointment was approved by the colonists. Yeamans arrived in the new colony in 1671 and was disappointed not to be made governor immediately, and used his position as speaker of the colonies first parliament to harass West. He also started to build a plantation into which he brought 200 African slaves.

On 21 August 1671 the proprietors, to the great dissatisfaction of the colonists, appointed Yeamans to the governorship. He was proclaimed Governor of the English Province of Carolina at Charles Town on 19 April 1672. Early in his governorship at the bequest of the proprietors he initiated a land survey for what would become Charles Town and expanded his plantation.

The colony during his governorship suffered from internal dissensions, and was threatened both by the Spaniards and the Indians. The proprietors found fault with Yeamans as extravagant and indifferent to their interests. The colonists objected to his profits as an exporter of food-stuffs from Barbados. In May 1674 the proprietors replaced Yeamans with his predecessor Joseph West, but Yeamans apparently died before he received the notice. The minutes of the colony's Grand Council show that Yeamans presided as governor over a meeting on 3 August 1674, but minutes for the next meeting on 13 August 1674 report that Yeamans had died.

Yeamans epitomized the enterprising Barbadians who played a large part in settling South Carolina. That some, like him, resembled pirates ashore probably both promoted and retarded development of the colony; it certainly contributed to political factionalism endemic during the early years.

— Robert Weir.

== Yeamans family ==
Coat of Arms of John Yeamans

Sir John Yeamans married twice: firstly to – Limp, with whom he had five sons, and secondly on 11 April 1661 to Margaret Berringer, they had four children (two sons and two daughters). It is likely that Yeamans had Benjamin Berringer, his former business partner and husband of Margaret, poisoned just weeks before the marriage. However the death was investigated and Yeamans was cleared by the council.

Yeamans' many descendants were still in prominent positions in West Indies affairs at the start of the 20th century. John's younger brother, Robert, also received a baronetcy on 31 December 1666 but he left no children.

Yeamans' connection with the colony is still commemorated by the ancient mansion of Yeamans Hall, on Goose Creek, near Charleston. Sir John's considerable wealth in Barbados passed to his son, Major Sir William Yeamans, second baronet, and great-grandfather of Sir John Yeamans of Barbados, whose son, Sir Robert (d. 19 February 1788), was the last baronet.

Yeamans was one of a large, often prominent, family named Yeamans or Yeomans of Bristol, England some of whom later became Quakers. One prominent member of the family was Robert Yeamans a sheriff of Bristol. In 1643 he plotted to seize a city gate and let in a Royalist army to overwhelm the Parliamentary garrison. The plot was discovered and he along with some fellow conspirators were executed by the Parliamentary military governor for treason. Robert Yeamans was not a close relation of Sir John. (Note: Therefore the relationship reported in Burke in A Genealogical and Heraldic History of the Extinct and Dormant Baronetcies is incorrect (Pollard & Kelsey 2008).)

== Notes ==
Footnotes

Citations

Baronetage of England
New creation	Baronet (of Bristol); 1665–1674	Succeeded by William Yeamans
