= Stapleton baronets of the Leeward Islands (1679) =

Extinct baronetcy in the Baronetage of England

Stapleton baronets
- Escutcheon of the Stapleton baronets of the Leeward Islands and of Greys Court, Oxfordshire
- Creation date: 1679
- Status: extinct
- Extinction date: 1995
- Seat: Greys Court
- Motto: Pro Magnâ Chartâ, For Magna Charta

The Stapleton Baronetcy, of the Leeward Islands, is an extinct title in the Baronetage of England. It was created on 20 December 1679 for William Stapleton, who followed Charles II into exile in France, and after the Restoration was appointed deputy-governor of Montserrat and captain-general of the Leeward Islands.

== Background ==
John Brooke wrote:

The Stapletons, of Irish extraction, emigrated to the West Indies temp. Charles II, and settled in Oxfordshire in the early 18th century.

The 4th Baronet sat as Member of Parliament for Oxfordshire. The 5th Baronet represented Oxford. They were supporters of the West India Interest, though their own main concerns were in the small islands of Nevis and Montserrat, and they were not very prominent.

In 1788 the abeyance of the ancient barony le Despencer was terminated in favour of the sixth Baronet, who became the twelfth Baron le Despencer. On his death, the baronetcy was inherited by the sixth baronet's youngest son Francis Joseph, who became the seventh Baronet. The 1679 baronetcy became extinct on the death of Sir Henry Alfred Stapleton, 10th Baronet, in 1995.

== Stapleton baronets, of The Leeward Islands (1679) ==
- Sir William Stapleton, 1st Baronet (died 1686)
- Sir James Stapleton, 2nd Baronet (1672–1690)
- Sir William Stapleton, 3rd Baronet (1674–1699); married Frances, daughter and coheiress of Sir James Russell, governor of Nevis.
- Sir William Stapleton, 4th Baronet (1698–1740), MP for Oxfordshire, 1727–1740, married Catherine Paul
- Sir Thomas Stapleton, 5th Baronet (1727–1781), MP for Oxford, 1759–1768, married (1765) Mary, daughter of Henry Fane of Wormsley
- Sir Thomas Stapleton, 6th Baronet (1766–1831), and 12th Baron le Despencer, of Mereworth Castle, married Elizabeth daughter of Samuel Eliot of Antigua;
- Hon. and Rev. Sir Francis Jervis (or Joseph) Stapleton, 7th Baronet (1807–1874), Rector Mereworth and Vicar of Tudeley Kent, (fourth son of the 6th bart.).
- Sir Francis George Stapleton, 8th Baronet (1831–1899)
- Sir Miles Talbot Stapleton, 9th Baronet (1893–1977)
- Sir Henry Alfred Stapleton, 10th Baronet (1913–1995), who died leaving no heir

== Plantation owners ==
The 1st and 3rd baronets owned and managed Caribbean plantations and enslaved people; the 4th, 5th and 6th baronets were absentees.

With deaths among the male heirs, control of the plantations in the earlier 18th century was largely in the hands of Lady Anne, widow of the 1st baronet, and Lady Frances Stapleton, widow of the 3rd baronet. Lady Frances outlived her two sons, the 4th baronet and James Russell Stapleton. She began to purchase property in England. On her death in 1746, her house in Cheltenham went to her granddaughter Catherine Stapleton (1734–1815), daughter of James Russell Stapleton.

A lengthy legal battle ensued after 1746, not settled for 15 years, over the will left by Lady Frances. It was settled in 1760–1 with a division of the estate between surviving parties and spouses. Catherine Stapleton, who did not marry, then became an absentee but active manager of plantations and enslaved people. She moved to Burton Pynsent, where she was the companion of Hester Pitt. The final division gave the 5th baronet 25%, Sir James Wright, 1st Baronet 12.5%, with 62.5% divided equally four ways between Catherine, Ellis Yonge (1717–1785) the husband of Catherine's sister Penelope (1732–1788), Elizabeth Stapleton and Frances Stapleton.

The will of Catherine Stapleton left most of her plantations to nephews, principally to two brothers, the Rev. William Cotton (died 1853), son of Sir Robert Salusbury Cotton, 5th Baronet who had married Frances Stapleton, and Baron Combermere. They went in time to Combermere. He received compensation as joint owner of the Stapleton estates on Nevis and St Kitts. The other joint owner was Barbara Yonge (1760−1837), daughter of Ellis and Penelope Yonge.

The will of the 6th baronet left on his death in 1829 the plantations to Francis John Stapleton, subject to an annuity payable to his daughter Frances, while his British estates went to the 7th baronet. The 7th baronet, as his father's executor, made an unsuccessful claim in the 1830s for compensation for the enslaved people on the Montpellier estate in Nevis.

== Extended family ==
James Paul, the son of William Paul the bishop of Oxford (1663–5), a Fishmonger and Linen Draper, of St. Michael Cornhill, London and Bray in Berkshire, bought Greys Court in 1688. By his second wife Martha, fourth daughter of Sir Thomas Duppa, usher of the black rod from 1683 to 1694, he had a son William, whose daughter Catherine married Sir William Stapleton, 4th Bt., to whom it passed in 1711 on her father's death. It then remained with the Stapletons until 1937.

The barony passed to the granddaughter (Mary) Frances Elizabeth of the 6th baronet; she married Evelyn Boscawen, 6th Viscount Falmouth, and was mother of Evelyn Boscawen, 7th Viscount Falmouth, 14th Baron le Despencer (see Baron le Despencer for further history of this title). Her father the Hon. Thomas Stapleton (1792–1829), son of the 6th baronet, had married Maria Wynne Bankes, daughter of Henry Bankes, of Kingston House, Dorset.

Of other daughters of the 6th baronet: Emma Stapleton (died 1879), married Charles Brodrick, 6th Viscount Midleton (1797–1863); Maria married Robert Jocelyn, 3rd Earl of Roden; Emily married Hercules Robert Pakenham; and Anna married Henry Maxwell, 7th Baron Farnham.

== See also ==
- Stapleton baronets
