= Burlington Company =

The Burlington Company was a group of eight American investors involved in a variety of land transactions between 1768 and 1770, particularly in what is now Otsego County, New York. The company was named after Burlington, New Jersey, where the men all resided.

== History ==
The Burlington Company included William Franklin, the last Colonial Governor of New Jersey (1763–1776).

The company purchased various mortgages of George Croghan between 1768 and 1770. The mortgages, issued to William Franklin and assigned by him to the company, included one for 40,000 acres (160 km^{2}) of Croghan's Otsego County, New York, purchase. Franklin was an attorney, a British Loyalist, and the son of Benjamin Franklin.

In addition to making personal loans to Croghan, Franklin purchased a 50% stock interest in the Burlington Company in 1772. In 1773, the remaining original shareholders sold their stock and rights, including Franklin's mortgages, to Andrew Craig (merchant) and William Cooper. Cooper was a merchant in Burlington.

Cooper and Craig instituted sheriff's sale proceedings under a judgment of 1773, neglecting to inform Franklin. After that, Craig and Cooper purchased the Otsego tract for $2,700 by questionable means. Efforts of Franklin and Croghan's heirs to contest the title proved fruitless.

Cooper later founded Cooperstown and Burlington, New York on this tract of land after the American Revolutionary War. Among his children was James Fenimore Cooper, who later became a noted author and set some of his work in this frontier region.

== See also ==
- List of real estate topics
- History of New York (state)
