= James Glen =

Governor of the Province of South Carolina (1701-1777)

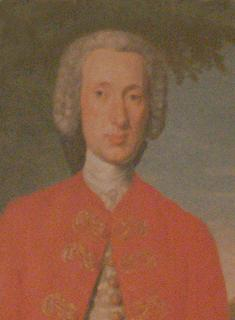

25th Governor of South Carolina
- In office December 17, 1743 – June 1, 1756
- Monarch: George II
- Preceded by: William Bull
- Succeeded by: William Henry Lyttelton

Personal details
- Born: 1701 Linlithgow, Scotland
- Died: July 18, 1777 London, England

James Glen (1701 – July 18, 1777) was a Scottish politician in the Province of South Carolina. He was appointed Royal Governor of South Carolina in 1738 but did not arrive in the province until December 17, 1743. He served as governor until June 1, 1756, and was succeeded by William Henry Lyttelton. On June 21, 1761, Glen returned to Europe and died in London. He is buried in St Michael's Parish Church, Linlithgow, Scotland.

== Early life ==
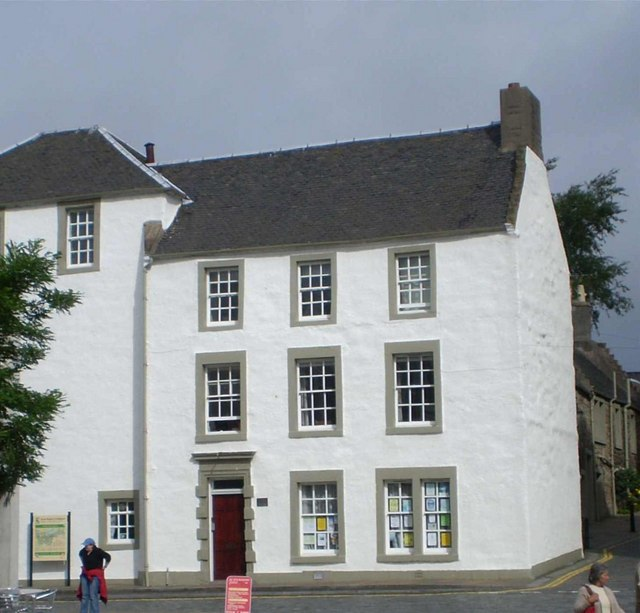
Cross House, Linlithgow

Glen was born in Linlithgow in 1701 to Alexander Glen and his wife Marion Graham. The family was of relatively high social standing and he studied law at Edinburgh University and Leiden University. He later rose to be provost of Linlithgow from 1724 to 1726 and again 1730 to 1736, becoming official keeper of Linlithgow Palace in 1743. He began travelling to America in 1739 but returned permanently to his home town from 1757, living at Cross House in Linlithgow.

== Governorship ==
James Glen has the longest term of governorship of any of those of colonial South Carolina. His term was noted for extensive dealings with Native American tribes on the colony's western and southern borders.

Traditionally the governor of South Carolina played the role of defender of the southern frontier, but with the creation of the Province of Georgia that role passed to Georgia Governor James Oglethorpe. This transfer of roles was accompanied by the transfer of a thousand pounds that no longer went to the governor of South Carolina but now went to his Georgian counterpart. Glen stayed in Britain to protest this change, and William Bull acted as governor in his stead.

== Dealings with Native Americans ==
Glen was noted for forging a 1755 treaty with the Cherokee, known as the Treaty of Saluda Old Town, in present-day Saluda County and the building of Fort Prince George near Keowee River. He was also responsible for promoting an official policy that aimed to create in Indians an "aversion" to African Americans in an attempt to thwart possible alliances between them.

=== King George's War ===
During King George's War, Glen sent a trade delegation led by notable Indian trader and historian James Adair to win over and convince the Choctaw chief Red Shoes to abandon the alliance with the French and to side with the British. The efforts led to a great civil war amongst the Choctaw Nation. Adair blamed the resulting failure on Glen for not supporting this mission.

Coat of Arms of James Glen

== Family ==
His younger sister Elizabeth married James Gordon of Ellon and was known as Mrs. Glen Gordon. It was she who entertained Bonnie Prince Charlie in 1746 in her capacity as deputy keeper of Linlithgow Palace.

== See also ==
- List of colonial governors of South Carolina
