= Joseph Morton II =

South Carolina politician and landgrave

Joseph Morton II Landgrave
- Morton Family Coat of Arms

Member of the South Carolina House of Representatives
- In office c. 1700 – c. 1720

Judge of the Admiralty Court for the Province of Carolina
- In office c. 1697 – c. 1720

Landgrave of the Province of Carolina
- In office 1687–1721
- Monarchs: James II; William III; Anne; George I

Deputy in the Governors Council of the Province of Carolina
- In office c. 1685 – c. 1710

Personal details
- Born: 1664 Somerset, Kingdom of England
- Died: 12 July 1721 (aged 56–57) Charleston, South Carolina
- Party: Dissenter
- Spouse: Sarah Wilkinson
- Children: at least 3
- Parent: Joseph Morton I
- Occupation: Planter class; Politician

Joseph Morton II was an early American Landgrave, politician, and planter in South Carolina. His father was Joseph Morton I, governor of South Carolina.

== Early life ==
Joseph Morton II was born in 1664 to Joseph Morton I and Eleanor Blake. His grandfather was Benjamin Blake (admiral).

== Political Career ==
In 1697 he was named a judge of the admiralty by King William III. He supported education and libraries in the colony. He also served as a Deputy on the Governors Council and as a member to the South Carolina House of Representatives.

== Later life & Legacy ==
He died in 1721, leaving behind three children.
