= Sir William Stapleton, 1st Baronet =

Irish colonial administrator and planter

Sir William Stapleton Bt

Governor of the Leeward Islands
- In office 1671–1686
- Monarch: Charles II
- Preceded by: Office established
- Succeeded by: Nathaniel Johnson

Personal details
- Born: Unknown Ireland
- Died: 3 August 1686 Paris, France
- Spouse: Anne Russell (m. 1671)
- Children: James, William, Miles, and Mary

Military service
- Allegiance: England
- Branch/service: English Army

Sir William Stapleton, 1st Baronet (died 3 August 1686) was an Irish colonial administrator and planter who served as the governor of the Leeward Islands from 1671 to 1686, when he died in office. Born in Ireland to a family of Norman descent, William, as a Royalist during the Wars of the Three Kingdoms, followed Charles II into exile in France.

Returning to England as part of the Stuart Restoration of 1660, William, as an English Army officer, travelled to the England's colonies in the West Indies, where he served as a prominent colonial official and married into a wealthy planter family, acquiring several slave plantations before dying in Paris in 1686.

== Early life ==
The third son of Redmond Stapleton, William was born in Ireland as the youngest child of a family which claimed descent from a Norman knight which had settled there during the reign of King Henry II of England. During the Wars of the Three Kingdoms, William, as a Royalist, followed the defeated Stuart monarch Charles II into exile in France. In 1660, Charles returned to England as part of the Stuart Restoration, and William followed him back, which opened new opportunities for him in England's colonies in the West Indies.

== West Indies and death ==
In 1667, Stapleton, as an English Army officer, sailed with Sir Tobias Bridge and his regiment to Barbados, where he was granted the rank of lieutenant colonel; the governor of Barbados, Lord Willoughby, dispatched him to the Leeward Islands. The next year, he was appointed Deputy Governor of Montserrat, and in 1671 William became the first governor of the Leeward Islands. The same year, he married Anne Russell, the daughter of Colonel Randolph Russell, a military officer and plantation owner based in Nevis, which brought William into a network of locally established planter families.

During his time in the West Indies, William acquired several slave plantations, including the "Waterwork" plantation in Montserrat, the "Cayon Quarter" plantation on Saint Kitts (a gift to William from Philip de Nogle), the "Figtree" plantation in Nevis, and the "Carleton" plantations on Antigua. The "Figtree" plantation was granted by him to Charles Pim on behalf of the Crown in 1678, with William quickly repurchasing the estate for 400,000 pounds of muscovado sugar; the "Carleton" plantations were granted to his older brother, Redmond in 1679, though three years later William purchased them from him for 100,000 pounds of muscovado sugar.

On 20 December 1679, William was awarded a baronetcy by the Crown; the Stapleton baronetcy became extinct in 1995 after the 10th baronet left no male heir. William died in Paris in 1686, leaving complicated financial affairs behind him. Stapleton's surviving sons were James, who succeeded him as the 2nd Baronet, but died young; the baronetcy was then passed to his second son William, who became the 3rd Baronet; and Miles. He also left a daughter, Mary, who married Irish colonial administrator Sir James Fitz Edmond Cotter.

== Bibliography ==
- Oliver, Vere Langford (2015) [1894]. The history of the island of Antigua, one of the Leeward Caribbees in the West Indies, from the first settlement in 1635 to the present time 1894. Facsimile Publisher. ISBN 978-9333366021.
- Akenson, Donald (1997). If the Irish Ran the World: Montserrat, 1630-1730. Liverpool University Press. ISBN 978-0853239628.

Baronetage of England
New creation	Baronet (of the Leeward Islands); 1679–1686	Succeeded by James Stapleton
