= Edward Tynte =

Colonial Governor of the province of Carolina (died 1710)

19th Governor of Carolina
- In office November 26, 1709 – June 26, 1710
- Monarch: Anne
- Preceded by: Nathaniel Johnson
- Succeeded by: Robert Gibbes

Personal details
- Died: 26 June 1710 Charles Town, Province of Carolina
- Profession: colonel, major, governor

Edward Tynte (died 26 June 1710) was a colonial governor of Carolina, serving from 1709 until 1710. Descending from a family of nobility, Tynte was appointed governor of Carolina in 1708. However, his arrival was delayed, and he only held office for six months before dying in 1710.

== Personal life ==
Tynte was from Somerset, England. He was the eldest son of the Reverend Edward Tynte, Vicar of Yatton, Somerset. Tynte was a descendant of the Tynte baronets in Somerset, a group that had recently risen to baronetcy, though his mother and siblings are unknown. Tynte was a Christian, and had joined the SPG by 1710. Tynte is variously called both a major and a colonel in surviving documents, providing evidence for some military career. Many of his family members attended Oxford University, and it is believed that Tynte was a culturally knowledgeable man based on a poem written for him by William King called "Ad Amicum."

== Political career ==
On December 9, 1708, Tynte was commissioned as the governor of Carolina by William Craven, 2nd Baron Craven. Concerning maritime trade, Tynte was instructed to allow ships to import or export goods only if their master and 75% of their crew were of English descent. Other instructions included monitoring whaling and the sale of land, along with establishing friendly relationships with the local Native Americans.

Tynte's arrival in South Carolina was delayed, as he arrived on November 26, 1709, and was officially named governor that day. Tynte was accompanied by many lawyers and merchants on his voyage to South Carolina, many of whom did not survive long after landing. Tynte succeeded Nathaniel Johnson as governor. Per the wishes of the proprietors of Carolina to encourage settlers to cultivate the local land, Tynte gave one hundred acres of land in what would become Albemarle and Bath County to any emigrant in Carolina. One of Tynte's few acts in his short governorship was signing legislation that would enact free public education in South Carolina. In accordance with the planned creation of the Province of North Carolina, Tynte was ordered to deputize Edward Hyde as its first governor, appointing Thomas Cary as the interim governor until Hyde arrived to be deputized.

== Death and aftermath ==
During his governorship, Tynte died on 26 June 1710, in Charles Town, South Carolina. In his will, made shortly before he left for Carolina, Tynte left his entire estate to Francis Killner, a spinster in London.

Before Tynte's death, he directed his three deputies to choose among themselves an interim governor to succeed Tynte. One of Tynte's deputies, Robert Gibbes, voted for himself and bribed another deputy, Fortescue Turberville, to vote for him, causing Gibbes to succeed Tynte.

Additionally, Tynte's death meant he did not officially sign Hyde's commission, causing a power struggle between Hyde and Cary that eventually led to Cary's Rebellion.
