= Nathaniel Johnson (politician) =

English soldier, politician and colonial administrator

Sir Nathaniel Johnson
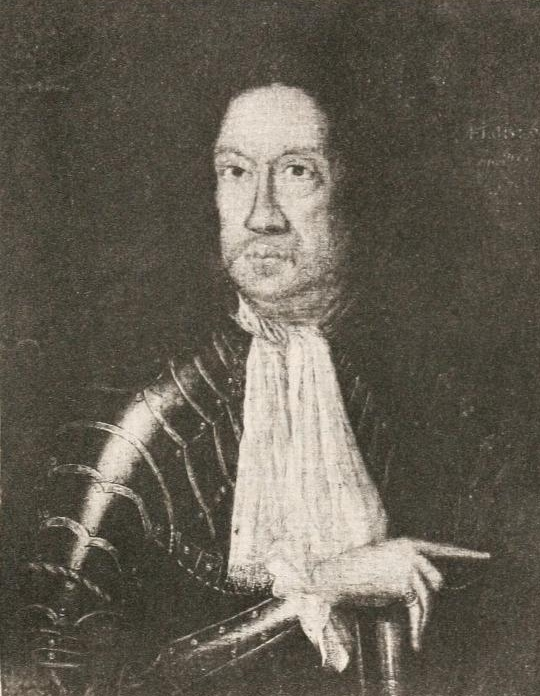

Governor of the Leeward Islands
- In office 1686–1689
- Monarchs: James II (1686–1688); William III (1688–1689)
- Preceded by: Sir William Stapleton
- Succeeded by: Christopher Codrington

Governor of Carolina
- In office 1703–1709
- Monarch: Queen Anne
- Preceded by: James Moore Sr.
- Succeeded by: Edward Tynte

Personal details
- Born: 7 April 1644 Near Kibblesworth, Durham
- Died: 1 July 1712 (aged 68) Berkeley County, South Carolina
- Resting place: Silk Hope Plantation, Berkeley County, South Carolina

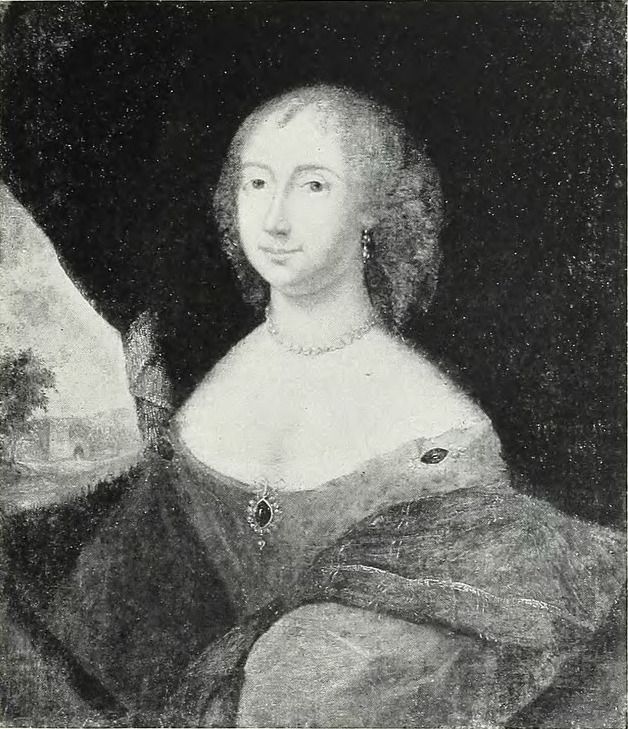
Lady Johnson

Sir Nathaniel Johnson (7 April 1644 – 1 July 1712) was an English soldier, politician and colonial administrator who represented Newcastle-upon-Tyne in the House of Commons of England from 1680 to 1689. He also served as the governor of the Leeward Islands and the governor of Carolina.

== Early life ==
Nathaniel Johnson was born on 7 April 1644 near Kibblesworth, Durham. He joined the English Army in his youth. Eventually, he started serving as member of parliament in the House of Commons of England, representing the constituency of Newcastle-upon-Tyne from 1680 to 1689.

== Governorships ==
In 1686, he was appointed governor of the Leeward Islands, governing Treves, Saint Kitts, Montserrat, and Antigua. He travelled to the Province of Carolina in 1689, becoming its governor in 1703. While he started his government sanctioned "a blow at the Spanish interest directed against Louisiana and Florida: the Apalachee expedition of 1704". In 1702, while he governed there, he oversaw the defense of Charles Town against an attempted Franco-Spanish assault. In addition, he created the Parish system in this colony.

Johnson rejected the constitutions of church and state because he believed these were dissenters of all denominations. So, to reduce or eliminate their power and influence, the Commons House of Assembly established a new bill that expulsed to the dissenters (who were mostly in South Carolina) of the Common House. The bill forced to the people who would want to be chosen in the Assembly accept and practice the rites of the Church of England, doing an oath, subscribing to a declaration and receiving a sacrament own of this church.

The dissenters refused this measure because they thought the governor had taken away their civil rights and religious liberties. The residents of Colleton County, elaborated and written about his "grievous circumstances" and gave it to the Lords Proprietors with order that they remove the law. It was enacted, that twenty lay-persons be constituted a corporation for the exercise of ecclesiastical jurisdiction, with full power to deprive ministers of their livings at pleasure, not for immorality only, but also for imprudence, or on account of unreasonable prejudices taken against them.

== Death and family ==
He ended his term in 1709 and died 1 July 1712 in Berkeley County, South Carolina. Johnson had, at least, two children: Robert, also a future Governor of South Carolina, and Ann (who married Gov. Thomas Broughton).

Legal offices
Preceded by Sir William Stapleton	Governor of the Leeward Islands; 1686 – 1689	Succeeded by Christopher Codrington
Preceded by James Moore Sr.	Governor of Carolina; 1703 – 1709	Succeeded by Edward Tynte
