= Lieutenant Governor of South Carolina =

Second-in-command to the governor of South Carolina

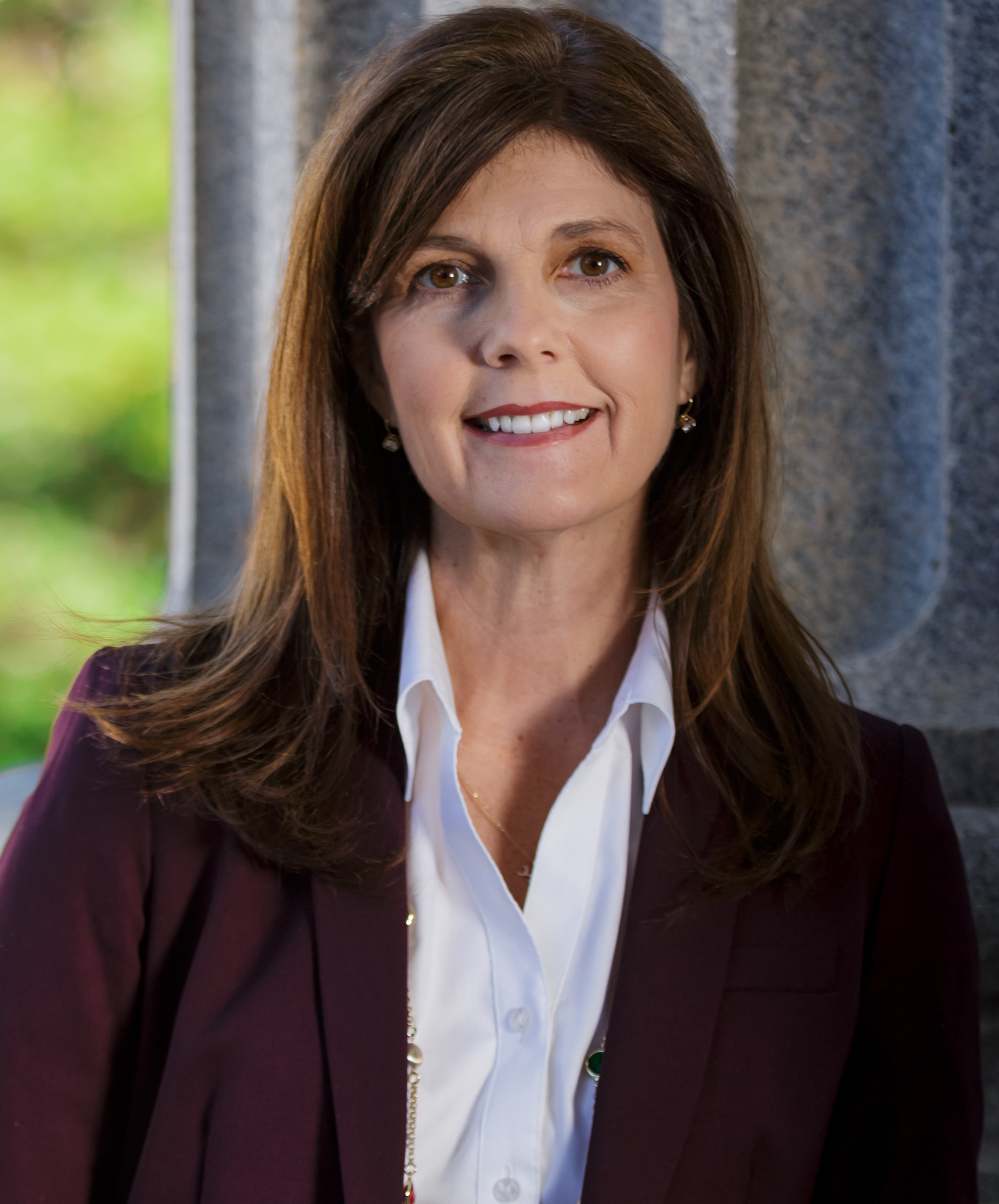
- Incumbent; Pamela Evette since January 9, 2019
- Style: Lieutenant Governor (informal); The Honorable (formal)
- Term length: Four years, renewable once consecutively
- Constituting instrument: Constitution of South Carolina
- Inaugural holder: Thomas Broughton (1730)
- Formation: January 1, 1730 (296 years ago)
- Succession: First
- Salary: $46,545 annually
- Website: Official website

The lieutenant governor of South Carolina is the second-in-command to the governor of South Carolina. Beyond the responsibility to act or serve as governor in the event of the office's vacancy, the duties of the lieutenant governor are chiefly ceremonial. The current lieutenant governor is Pamela Evette, who took office January 9, 2019.

== History ==
As an English/British colony, the Province of South Carolina had no lieutenant governors when it was governed under proprietary rule. The position of lieutenant governor was introduced when the colony became subject to royal governance. Under this system, the lieutenant governor's only duties were to act as the chief executive of the colony in the event of the royal governors' absence. For 25 of the 56 years in which South Carolina was administered under the British Crown, the lieutenant governor acted as its chief executive. The governor was always an appointed Englishman, whereas the lieutenant governor was always a resident of South Carolina. They served their own terms at the pleasure of the British Crown and received the same compensation.

In 1776, South Carolina's Provincial Congress adopted a constitution for the colony to be abided by "until an accommodation of the unhappy differences between Great Britain and America can be obtained." The document prescribed the formation of a legislature, the South Carolina General Assembly, which elected a president and vice president from their own ranks. Two years later South Carolina, now a U.S. state, adopted another constitution which changed the positions of president and vice president to governor and lieutenant governor, respectively. Both offices remained filled by the choice of the legislature.

In 1865, South Carolina adopted a new constitution which provided for both the governor and lieutenant governor to be popularly elected to serve concurrent four year terms. The document also made the lieutenant governor the president of the South Carolina Senate. The 1868 state constitution shortened the governor's and lieutenant governor's terms to two years but continued with the designation of the lieutenant governor as the presiding officer of the Senate. In 2012, the state constitution was amended, removing the lieutenant governor's ability to preside over the Senate and providing for them to be elected on a joint ticket with the governor. The election changes went into effect with new legislation in 2018, which state legislators said would enable more partisan cohesiveness and cooperation between the governor and lieutenant governor and make the latter office more analogous to the United States vice presidency. In January 2019, the State Senate replaced the outgoing lieutenant governor with a president of the Senate elected from among their own members.

Alonzo J. Ransier, elected lieutenant governor in 1870, was the first black person to hold the office in the state. Nancy Stevenson, elected in 1978, was the first woman to serve as lieutenant governor. The current lieutenant governor is Republican Pamela Evette, who took office January 9, 2019.

== Election and term ==
The lieutenant governor is elected at the same time and on the same ticket as the governor. As with the governor the lieutenant governor may be elected any number of times but no more than twice consecutively. The lieutenant governor must also meet the eligibility requirement as the office of governor.

Should the lieutenant governor leave the office before the end of their term or die, the governor appoints a new lieutenant governor.

== Duties, powers, and structure ==
The office of lieutenant governor is considered a part-time position and has no constitutional responsibilities outside of exercising the powers of the governor when necessary. Due to the lack of formal responsibilities, the political role of the position is greatly influenced by the preferences of the concurrently-serving governor. As a part-time position, the lieutenant governor receives an annual salary of $46,545.

== See also ==
- Governor of South Carolina
- South Carolina Senate
- South Carolina General Assembly

== Works cited ==
- McCrady, Edward (1899). The History of South Carolina Under the Royal Government, 1719-1776. London: MacMillan & Company. ISBN 9780598959867.
- Reynolds, John S. (1905). Reconstruction in South Carolina, 1865-1877. Columbia: The State Company.
- Wallace, David Duncan (1899). Constitutional History of South Carolina from 1725 to 1775 (PhD thesis). Abbeville, South Carolina.
