= Joseph West (politician) =

American politician

2nd Governor of South Carolina
- In office March 4, 1671 – April 19, 1672
- Monarch: James II & VII
- Preceded by: William Sayle
- Succeeded by: John Yeamans
- In office August 13, 1674 – October 1682
- Monarch: James II & VII
- Preceded by: John Yeamans
- Succeeded by: Joseph Morton
- In office August 30, 1684 – July 1, 1685
- Monarch: James II & VII
- Preceded by: Richard Kyrle
- Succeeded by: Robert Quary

Personal details
- Died: 1691 Ashley River (South Carolina)?
- Occupation: ship captain and colonial administrator

Joseph West (died 1691), was an English ship captain, and an early Colonial governor of South Carolina.

== Biography ==
=== Early life ===
Nothing is known of the circumstances of his birth or early years. In 1667 he was commissioned captain of Jersey, seeing service in the Second Anglo-Dutch War.

West was probably attached to the service of one of the eight proprietors of Carolina, chief among whom were the Duke of Albemarle and Lord Shaftesbury. From his correspondence, preserved at the Public Record Office, his relations appear to have been specially close with the latter. On 27 July 1669 he was given the command of a small fleet and ordered by the proprietors to sail from London for Kinsale and thence by way of Barbados to Port Royal, Carolina, in the vicinity of which place he was to settle a new plantation under constitutions drawn up mainly by John Locke, the secretary of the proprietors. West was also appointed to act as storekeeper in the new colony.

West sailed from The Downs in the ship Carolina on 17 August 1669, and the expedition finally reached Port Royal on 17 March 1669/70. A few months later they began to settle Ashley River, as the new plantation was called, and Charles Town, the site of which was subsequently removed (1679–80) to Oyster Point.

=== South Carolina Governor ===
West, though he had no experience as a "planter", took a leading part in the conduct of affairs as deputy for the governor, William Sayle, whose health was failing. Sayle died on 4 March 1671, whereupon West was unanimously chosen governor by the colonial council. In the following December Sir John Yeamans claimed the governorship on the ground that he had been made a landgrave by the proprietors. The council expressed themselves so well satisfied with the administration of West that they resolved not to disturb him in his government; but shortly afterwards an express nomination of Yeamans to the post arrived from England, and in this the colonists acquiesced. West was at the same time appointed "register of all writings and documents". But Yeamans proved popular neither with the settlers nor with the proprietors, his health was feeble, he was suspected of avarice in private trading, and early in 1674 he retired to Barbados, leaving the field clear for West, to whom the proprietors on 18 May 1674 sent a patent to be landgrave and a commission to be governor.

His salary was 100l. as governor and 60l. as storekeeper. The new governor's administration was marked by "care, fidelity, and prudence." He obtained deeds of transfer of lands from Native American chiefs, made regulations respecting the militia, roads, the status of servants and slaves, and in his last parliament of May 1682 passed "acts for suppressing idleness, drunkenness, and profanity." In the same year was commenced the building of the English church in Charles Town; but the utmost tolerance was extended to the religious dissenters, who comprised the larger part of the population. West was removed from the governorship towards the close of 1682, having, it is supposed, incurred the displeasure of the proprietors by permitting the sale and transport of Native American slaves from Carolina into other colonies. His dismissal was soon regretted, and in September 1684 he was reappointed governor; but for private reasons he resigned his post and left the colony in the summer of 1685. It is supposed that he visited London, where he seems to have left his wife, and that he returned eventually to his estate upon the Ashley River; but nothing is known definitely of his later career, and he died in 1691.
