= Sheila L. Skemp =

American historian

Academic background
- Education: University of Iowa
- Thesis: A social and cultural history of Newport, Rhode Island, 1720-1765 (1974)

Sheila L. Skemp is an American historian. She was the Clare Leslie Marquette Professor of American History at the University of Mississippi.

== Education ==
Skemp is originally from Illinois. She has a B.A. from the University of Montana (1967) and earned her Ph.D. from the University of Iowa (1974). She moved to the University of Mississippi in 1980 where she was named the Clare Leslie Marquette Professor of American History in 2008. She led the Sarah Isom Center for Women at the University of Mississippi from 1998 until 2000. She retired in 2014.

== Awards and honors ==
Skemp was honored by the University of Mississippi as the first person named Outstanding Teacher in Liberal Arts in 1985. In 2018 the University of Montana honored Skemp as a distinguished alumna.

== Selected publications ==
- Skemp, Sheila L. (1990). William Franklin : son of a patriot, servant of a king. Oxford University Press. ISBN 0-19-505745-7. OCLC 20723923.
- Skemp, Sheila L. (1994). Benjamin and William Franklin : father and son, patriot and loyalist. Boston: Bedford Books of St. Martin's Press. ISBN 0-312-10283-6. OCLC 30416760.
- Skemp, Sheila L. (1998). Judith Sargent Murray : a brief biography with documents. Bedford. ISBN 0-312-11506-7. OCLC 876097266.
- Skemp, Sheila L. (2013). The making of a patriot : Benjamin Franklin at the Cockpit. Oxford University Press. ISBN 978-0-19-538657-8. OCLC 795334087.
- Skemp, Sheila L. (2009). First lady of letters : Judith Sargent Murray and the struggle for female independence. Philadelphia: University of Pennsylvania Press. ISBN 978-0-8122-0352-3. OCLC 794702353.
