= Robert Gibbes =

English Landgrave and colonial administrator

20th Proprietary Period Governor of South Carolina
- In office June 1710 – March 19, 1712
- Monarch: Anne
- Preceded by: Edward Tynte
- Succeeded by: Charles Craven

Personal details
- Born: January 9, 1644 England
- Died: June 24, 1715 (aged 71) South Carolina
- Spouse(s): Jane Davis (marriage in 1678), Mary Davis (marriage in 1688) and Elizabeth Rixam (1710)
- Children: Robert Gibbes, Mary Gibbes, William Gibbes, Elizabeth Gibbes, and John Gibbes
- Parent(s): Robert Gibbes and Mary Coventry
- Occupation: Sheriff of Berkeley County (1683) Captain to Lieutenant Colonel in the South Carolina militia (1685–1698) Member of the First Commons House of Assembly (1692–1694) Proprietor’s Deputy and Member of the Grand Council (1698) Chief Justice of South Carolina (1708) Acting Governor of Carolina Province (1710–1712)

Robert Gibbes (January 9, 1644 – June 24, 1715) was a prominent English Landgrave and one of the first settlers of Charles Town (now Charleston) in 1670 and played a significant role in the early governance of South Carolina. He held multiple key positions in the colonial administration, including lieutenant colonel in the South Carolina militia, member of the first Commons House of Assembly, Proprietor’s Deputy, member of the Grand Council, Chief Justice of South Carolina, and Acting Governor of the entire Carolina Province.

== Biography ==
=== Early life ===
Robert Gibbes was born in Sandwich, Kent County, England on January 9, 1644 to Robert Gibbes and Mary Coventry, both of whom were English. Later in life, Gibbes moved to Barbados, settling in Sandarich. Sometime before 1670, he and his brother, Thomas, attempted to find a settlement in Cape Fear, North Carolina for the Lords Proprietors, but their efforts failed. Gibbes then began to accumulate land in the South Carolina province. Gibbes was among the first settlers of Charles Town, South Carolina, in 1670.

Robert Gibbes began his political career in 1684 when he became a Sheriff of Carolina. He was an elected member of the First Commons House of Assembly in 1692, representing the Colleton County. In 1698, he was appointed a Proprietor's Deputy and a member of the Grand Council, as well as Chief Justice later the same year.

=== Government in South Carolina ===
After the death of governor Edward Tynte in June 1710, Robert Gibbes was elected acting governor by the Executive Council, between the three proprietary deputies of Tynte. Gibbes won the position of governor after receiving only one vote more than his opponent, Thomas Broughton, which was achieved through bribery.

Both Broughton and Gibbes claimed their personal rights to rule the Council, with a majority of the people supporting Gibbes. In one incident, Broughton took gunmen and a group of slaves from his plantation and went to Charles Town in order to assert his right to access the government council. After running a short parliament, the party of Broughton demanded admission. Gibbes was interested in why Broughton came with a number of gunmen if he recognized himself as governor. Broughton responded that they had come to the city because they were aware of the concerns in the province that indicated the likelihood of a negative event and the fact that the inhabitants did not favor Gibbes to rule the province. Gibbes was subsequently refused entry to the city to Broughton. As a consequence, many of the men of Broughton galloped around the walls of the city. These included many sailors that favored Broughton, who gathered on ships in the local port with the intention of destroying the drawbridge. Gibbes's and his followers opposed them, but were forbidden from shooting them.

As a consequence, there was an armed confrontation between the two candidates for the city government and the men who supported them in militias. There were wounded men on both sides. They lowered the drawbridge, entered, and exercised the guard house on Broad Street. Some of the sailors of Broughton were captured. Some militia fired their weapons, despite their leaders not having given firing orders. Despite this, no one was injured.

Broughton proceeded with his march for a short while longer. Broughton then proclaimed as governor, followed by a series of cheers. They approached the door of the city fortress and forced their entry.

Many knights were then presented to the door and tried to prevent them from entreating, resulting in a retreat to the bay. After much altercation and several discussions between both parties, the Lords Proprietors decided not to support any of them, nor Gibbes or Broughton, although the former acted as governor in meantime.

Charles Craven was soon appointed to take the place of Robert Gibbes in 1711.

Lords Proprietors declared that the election of Gibbes was illegal because it was established through bribery. However, they allowed Gibbes to rule for almost a year.

During the government of Robert Gibbes in South Carolina, the Tuscarora War began in North Carolina. Gibbes sent Colonels James Moore and John Barnwell to help in the Albemarle region.

Many of the local Native Americans abandoned the area shortly after the war began, taking all Tuscarora captive, except for one girl who was sold into slavery in the province of South Carolina. As a result, Colonel John Barnwell received rapid success throughout the wartime period.

Barnwell wrote to the acting governor Robert Gibbes in Charles Town that they had won the war and now had many provisions at their disposal, including fruit trees.

Gibbes ruled South Carolina until March 19, 1712. He was replaced upon the arrival to the province of the new governor (elected in 1711), Charles Craven.

Gibbes died on June 24, 1715, in South Carolina.

== Personal life ==
Gibbes married three times, the first two in Barbados. His first marriage was with Jane Davis (on October 24, 1678), with whom he had two children, namely Mary and Robert Gibbes. The second was with Mary Davis (on January 12, 1688), with whom he had three children: William, Elizabeth and John Gibbes. His third and final marriage was with Elizabeth Rixam (in 1710, in South Carolina).

His grandson William Gibbes was a wealthy ship owner and merchant who built a home at 64 South Battery, Charleston, in 1772. He was a member of the first and second Provincial Congresses, and a South Carolina state legislator. A member of the Committee of Five in the Council of Safety at the start of the Revolutionary War, he was also a member of the Committee of Secret Service, which gathered war information. His family was evicted from their house when the British captured Charleston in 1780.

His great-great-grandson James Shoolbred Gibbes (1819–1888) was a successful merchant and stockholder in the South Carolina Railroad Company and the Gaslight Company renowned for his bequest of $100,000 in his 1888 will that led to the establishment of the Gibbes Museum of Art. He was also the founder and first president of the Peoples National Bank of Charleston (one of the first banks established under the National Banking Act of 1863).

Gibbes established a lineage that formed part of the colonial aristocracy with ties to America's founding fathers and the British royal family that would intertwine with some of the most prominent families in Anglo-American history. Notable Gibbes family marriages include:

- Mary "Polly" Gibbes, married Thomas Middleton, son of Henry Middleton and brother of Arthur Middleton, a Founding Father of the United States, signer of the United States Declaration of Independence, and a representative from South Carolina in the Second Continental Congress.
- His granddaughter Elizabeth Mathews, married Thomas Heyward Jr., a Founding Father of the United States, signer of the United States Declaration of Independence, and a member of the Continental Congress.
- His great-grandson Lewis Ladson Gibbes, married Maria Henrietta Drayton; niece of Arthur Middleton.
- His great-great-granddaughter Charlotte Augusta Gibbes, married John Jacob Astor III. Their son, William Waldorf Astor became the 1st Viscount Astor. Through William's son, John Jacob Astor, 1st Baron Astor of Hever, Robert Gibbes is the great-great-great-grandfather of Harry Marcus George Lopes (b. 1977), who married Laura Rose Parker Bowles — the daughter of Queen Camilla, stepdaughter of King Charles III, and stepsister to William, Prince of Wales and Prince Harry, Duke of Sussex. Marcus and Laura’s daughter Eliza was a bridesmaid at the wedding of Prince William and Catherine Middleton on 29 April 2011. Their sons Gus and Louis were Pages of Honour to their grandmother at her coronation.

=== Death ===
Robert Gibbes died on June 24, 1715, in Charles Towne, leaving behind a lasting imprint on the political, legal, and familial history of both America and Britain.
