= Josiah Hardy =

Governor of New Jersey
- In office 1761–1763
- Monarch: George III
- Preceded by: Thomas Boone
- Succeeded by: William Franklin

Personal details
- Born: 1715 England
- Died: 1790 (aged 74–75)
- Occupation: Merchant, Politician, Diplomat

Josiah Hardy (1715 – 1790) was a British merchant and colonial administrator who served as the governor of New Jersey from 1761 to 1763. He was succeeded in the post by William Franklin, the son of Benjamin Franklin. Hardy was later appointed as consul at Cádiz.

== Early life and education ==
Hardy came from a naval family. His father was Vice-Admiral Sir Charles Hardy, and one of his brothers, Charles Hardy, became an admiral.

== Career ==
He became a merchant, emphasizing trade between Great Britain and the North American colonies. In 1761, he was appointed as Governor of New Jersey, serving until 1763. He was succeeded by William Franklin, the son of Benjamin Franklin, who were both born in the colony of Pennsylvania.

== Marriage and family ==
Hardy married Harriet, daughter of Sir Thomas D'Aeth, and they had five daughters: Harriet, Elizabeth Sophia, Priscilla, Louisa and Charlotte.

Their fourth daughter, Louisa (1757–1853), married the naval officer Lieutenant John Cooke on 15 June 1790 at St Leonard's, Shoreditch. They had a single daughter together, born on 26 January 1797 at Stoke Damerel. Cooke was killed while commanding HMS Bellerophon at the Battle of Trafalgar on 21 October 1805.

== Notes ==
Government offices
Preceded by Thomas Boone	Governor of New Jersey; 1761–1763	Succeeded by William Franklin
