= Joseph Morton I =

American politician (c.1630–1721)

Joseph Morton I Landgrave
- Morton Family Coat of Arms

4th Governor of Province of South Carolina
- In office 1682–1684
- Appointed by: William Craven, 1st Earl of Craven
- Monarch: William III
- Preceded by: Joseph West
- Succeeded by: Richard Kyrle

Interim Governor of Province of South Carolina
- In office October 1685 – November 1686
- Succeeded by: Robert Quary

Governor of Charles Town
- In office 1685–1686

Personal details
- Born: Joseph Morton; 1630 England, U.K.
- Died: 1687 (aged 56–57) Charleston, South Carolina, U.S.
- Spouse: Elizabeth Blake
- Children: 3, including Joseph Morton II

Military service
- Battles/wars: 1686 Spanish Invasion of South Carolina

Joseph Hubert Morton I (c. 1630 – 9 September 1721) was an early colonist and governor of the Province of Carolina. Although he was not one of Carolina's Lords Proprietors, Morton was influential in the recruitment of religious dissenters to migrate to the new colony. In 1680 he led a group of dissenters to what is now South Carolina, settling Edisto Island. In 1682 he was appointed governor of the colony by the proprietors, but due to disagreements with the proprietors was replaced in 1684. A second appointment in 1686 lasted only one month before he was supplanted by James Colleton. After the 1686 Spanish Invasion of South Carolina and the burning of his plantation home, Morton organized an expedition against Spanish Florida, which the colonists believed was harboring pirates operating against the colony's coastal settlements. Colleton immediately put a stop to the expedition, since England and Spain were then at peace.

He died in 1687, leaving behind at least 3 children, including Joseph Morton II.
