= Thomas Boone (governor) =

American politician

7th Royal Governor of New Jersey
- In office 1760–1761
- Monarch: George III
- Preceded by: Francis Bernard
- Succeeded by: Josiah Hardy

28th Governor of South Carolina
- In office 5 April 1760 – 14 May 1764
- Monarch: George III
- Preceded by: William Bull II
- Succeeded by: William Bull II

Personal details
- Born: 1730 England
- Died: 25 September 1812 (aged 81–82) Lee (then part of County Kent)
- Resting place: St. Nicholas Church, Godstone, England
- Occupation: colonial administrator

Coat of Arms of Thomas Boone

Thomas Boone (c. 1730 – 25 September 1812) was the 7th Royal Governor of New Jersey and the 28th Royal Governor of South Carolina. The New Jersey town of Boonton (Boone Town, Booneton) is named in his honour.

== Early life ==
Boone was born in England in 1730 or 1731. His father, Charles Boone, was a merchant with interests in the East Indies whose family also included major landowners in the Province of South Carolina, and his mother, Elizabeth Garth Boone, was from a military family from County Durham. The extended family was well connected to the politically powerful Duke of Newcastle. Thomas' older brother Charles served in Parliament for many years, married into the wealthy and powerful Crowley family, and was a friend of Horace Walpole. Educated at Eton and Trinity College, Cambridge, Boone came to South Carolina in 1752 to claim title and lands he had inherited from the Boone and Colleton families. He traveled to England in 1754, and returned to South Carolina in 1758, at which time he married Sarah Ann Tattnall Perroneau.

== Political career ==
Possibly through the influence of his brother Charles, Boone was appointed Governor of New Jersey in 1759, but he did not arrive in New Jersey until 10 May 1760. He did not meet with the colonial assembly until 30 October 1760. Six months later, he was appointed Governor of South Carolina. He arrived in Charleston in December 1761, and replaced acting governor William Bull II.

In 1762, Boone refused to administer the oath of office to a newly elected provincial assemblyman named Christopher Gadsden, stating that his election was not valid. Without taking the oath, Gadsden could not take his seat. When the Assembly objected, Governor Boone dissolved the Assembly and called for new elections.

When the Assembly reconvened that winter after elections (in which Gadsden was able to take his seat), they drew up a resolution condemning Governor Boone's actions. The Assembly then produced a resolution stating clearly that the Assembly held sole authority to determine the validity of any elections of its members.

Boone replied that he was acting under his authority as the representative of the British Crown. Ultimately, Boone and the Assembly could not come to an agreement, and the Assembly refused to conduct any business at all with the Governor until their complaints were addressed, refusing even to pass tax bills or appropriate money to pay the salaries of the various administrative staff.

Finally, Boone gave up. Taking advantage of a previous offer of a leave of absence, he sailed to England and the matter passed. In May 1764, he left lieutenant governor Bull to fill in as acting governor, and went home to England.

He served for many years as commissioner of customs, resigning the post in 1805. His properties in South Carolina were confiscated after the American Revolutionary War. He died at Lee (then part of County Kent) on 25 September 1812.

Government offices
Preceded by Francis Bernard	Governor of the Province of New Jersey; 1760–1761	Succeeded by Josiah Hardy
Preceded by William Bull II (acting)	Governor of the Province of South Carolina; 1761–1764	Succeeded by William Bull II (acting)
