= Joseph Aplin =

Canadian lawyer (1740–1804)

Joseph Aplin (c. 1740 – April 26, 1804) was a lawyer and political figure in colonial Nova Scotia and Prince Edward Island. He represented Barrington Township in the Nova Scotia House of Assembly from 1785 to 1787.

He was born in Rhode Island, the son of John Aplin, and became a lawyer like his father, setting up practice in Newport. As a loyalist, he was forced to move to New York City and went to Nova Scotia in 1783. In 1787, he went to St. John's Island (later Prince Edward Island) as solicitor general for Edmund Fanning. In 1790, he was named attorney general. Aplin was charged with wrongdoing by supporters of former governor Walter Patterson in 1791; he was exonerated and successfully sued for damages in 1793. In 1798, after becoming associated with a group advocating that the island rejoin Nova Scotia, he resigned from the island's Council and was dismissed as attorney general. After unsuccessfully attempting to clear his name in England, he returned to Annapolis Royal where he resumed his law practice. Aplin is believed to have died in Rhode Island.
