= Thomas Broughton (governor) =

American politician

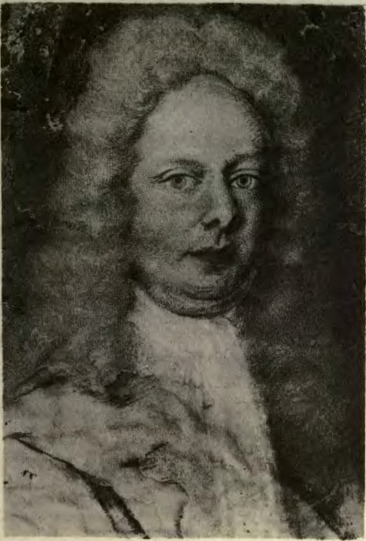
- portrait attributed to Henrietta Johnston

23rd Governor of South Carolina
- In office May 3, 1735 – November 22, 1737
- Monarch: George II
- Preceded by: Robert Johnson
- Succeeded by: William Bull

1st Lieutenant Governor of South Carolina
- In office January 1, 1730 – November 22, 1737
- Governor: Arthur Middleton; Robert Johnson
- Preceded by: Office Established
- Succeeded by: William Bull I

Personal details
- Born: ca. 1668 Unknown
- Died: November 22, 1737 Berkeley County, South Carolina
- Spouse: Ann Johnson Broughton

Thomas Broughton (ca. 1668 – November 22, 1737) was a colonial-era official in South Carolina, serving a variety of positions, including acting governor from May 5, 1735, through November 22, 1737.

== Biography ==
Broughton was the second son of Andrew and Ann Overton Broughton of Seaton, England, and born around 1668. He is presumed to have been born in Rutland, based on his father being Sheriff of Rutland in 1669. He immigrated to South Carolina from the West Indies, possibly from the Leeward Islands, where his father-in-law Sir Nathaniel Johnson, the future governor of the Province of Carolina (1703–1709) was Governor in 1686–89. The first record of Thomas Broughton in South Carolina was in 1692 when he pledged his allegiance to King William III and Queen Mary II of England. After his arrival in South Carolina he would marry Ann Johnson, the daughter of Sir Nathaniel Johnson and sister of future South Carolina Governor Robert Johnson.

== Career ==
Broughton rose from captain through to major general in a 10-year stretch between 1696 and 1706. In addition, he held numerous other offices in the colony, including serving as a member of the Commons House of Assembly from 1696 to 1703), 1716 to 1717, and 1725 to 1727; controller and collector of customs (1708); commissioner of Free School at Charles Towne (1710, 1712); assistant to Judge of Admiralty to try men accused of piracy (1716, 1717, 1720); and collector of the Port of Charleston (1721). In 1702 Broughton was appointed as deputy to John Carteret, 2nd Baron Carteret (later 2nd Earl of Granville); and served on the eight-member Executive Council under acting governor James Moore and Governor Sir Nathaniel Johnson. Broughton served as speaker of the Assembly from 1725 to 1727, and was named Lt. Governor of the province by a commission of King George II in 1729, the same commission which appointed his brother-in-law Robert Johnson as governor. When Johnson died on May 5, 1735, Broughton, took over as the province’s chief executive. Broughton died in office on Nov. 22, 1737. His burial site is unknown, but believed to be in South Carolina, quite possibly near his residence, called Mulberry Plantation. Broughton’s administration was noted for the beginning of constitutional struggles between the Commons House of Assembly and the advisors to the Crown over who had the right to originate grants of money in the province. Broughton’s residence, Mulberry Plantation, is located on the western branch of the Cooper River, near Moncks Corner in Berkeley County. The residence, built in 1714, is the third-oldest home in South Carolina. During the 1715 Yemassee War, many individuals took refuge at Mulberry as the structure had been constructed over a fortified cellar fort with firing slits in the foundation walls.
