= Province of South Carolina =

Former British province in North America

- Province of Great Britain
- 1712–1776
- British Red Ensign Royal coat of arms

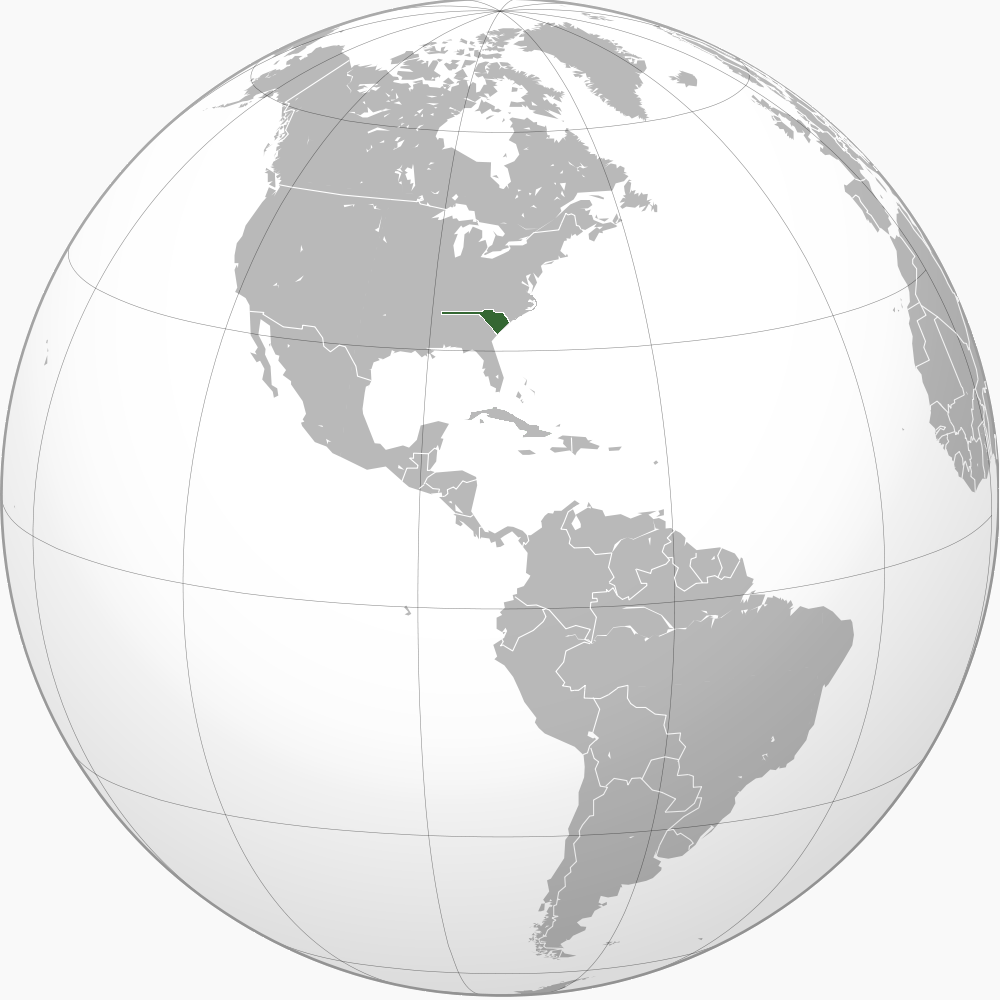
- Location of South Carolina in North America

Anthem
- "God Save the King" (Note: There was no authorized version of the national anthem as the words were a matter of tradition; only the first verse was usually sung. No statute had been enacted designating "God Save the King" as the official anthem. In the English tradition, such laws are not necessary; proclamation and usage are sufficient to make it the national anthem. "God Save the King" also served as the Royal anthem for certain royal colonies. The words King, he, him, his were replaced by Queen, she, her when the monarch was female.)
- Capital: Charlestown
- Area
  - Coordinates: 34°N 81°W
- Government
  - Type: Proprietary colony (1712–1729); Royal colony (1729–1776)
- Monarch
  - 1712–1714: Anne
  - 1714–1727: George I
  - 1727–1760: George II
  - 1760–1776: George III
- Governor
  - 1712: Robert Gibbes (first)
  - 1775–1776: Lord William Campbell (last)
- Legislature: General Assembly
  - Upper house: Council
  - Lower house: Assembly
- Historical era: Georgian era
  - Partition of Carolina: January 24, 1712
  - Ceded to the crown of Great Britain: July 25, 1729
  - Partition of South Carolina: 9 June 1732
  - Declaration of Independence from Great Britain: July 4, 1776
Preceded by	Succeeded by
Province of Carolina	South Carolina
- Today part of: United States: Alabama; Georgia; Mississippi; North Carolina; South Carolina; Tennessee

The Province of South Carolina, originally known as Clarendon Province, was a province of the Kingdom of Great Britain that existed in North America from 1712 to 1776. It was one of the five Southern colonies and one of the Thirteen Colonies in America of the British Empire. The monarch of Great Britain was represented by the Governor of South Carolina, until the colonies declared independence on July 4, 1776.

== Etymology ==
Carolina is taken from the name Carolus, the Latin version of Charles, named in honor of King Charles II, and was first named in the 1663 Royal Charter granting to Edward, Earl of Clarendon; George, Duke of Albemarle; William, Lord Craven; John, Lord Berkeley; Anthony, Lord Ashley; Sir George Carteret, Sir William Berkeley, and Sir John Colleton the right to settle lands in the present-day U.S. states of North Carolina, Tennessee, South Carolina, Georgia, Alabama, Mississippi, and Florida.

== History ==
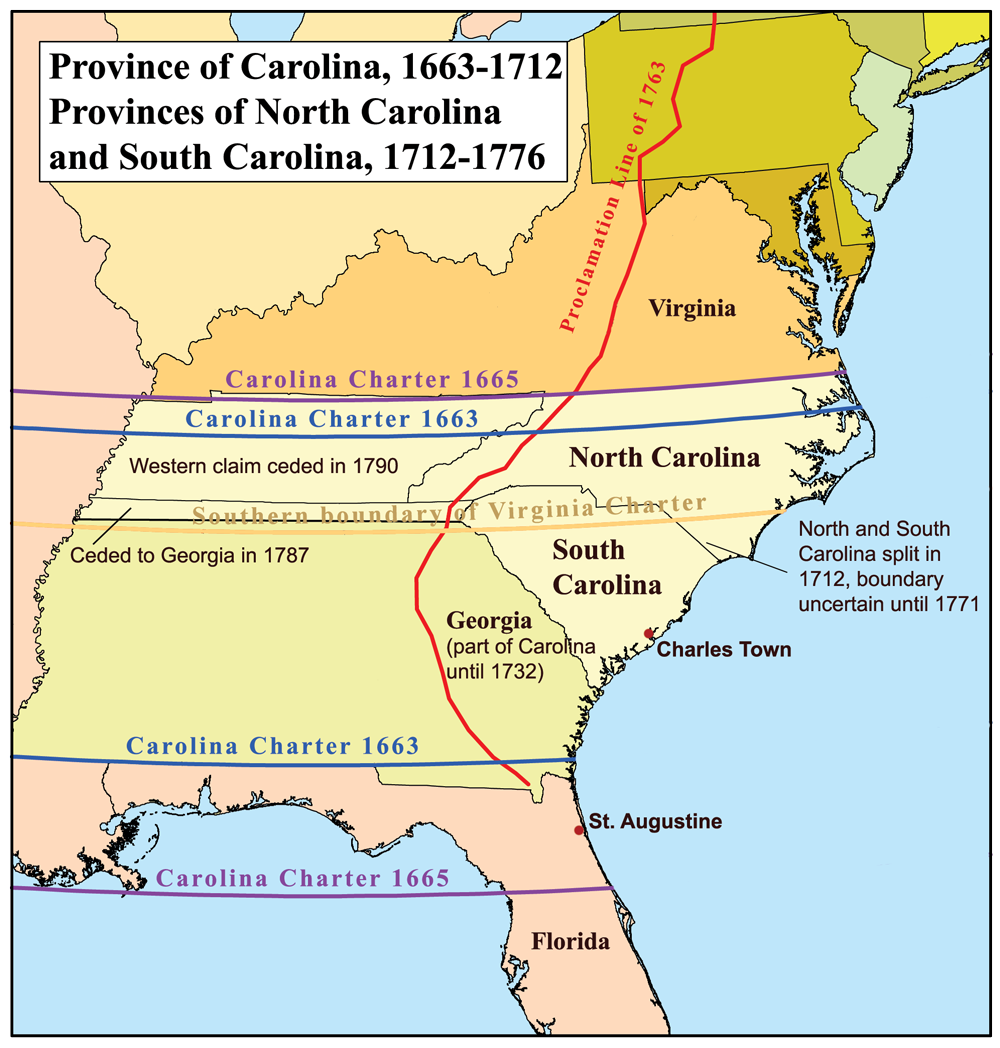
The Province of Carolina before and after the split into north and south

Charles Town was the first settlement, established in 1670. King Charles II had given the land to a group of eight nobles called the lords proprietor; they planned for a Christian colony. Originally a single proprietary colony, the northern and southern sections grew apart over time, due partly to neglect by the legal heirs of the original lords proprietor. Dissent over the governance of the province led to the appointment of a deputy governor to administer the northern half of the Province of Carolina in 1691. The partition of the province into North and South Carolina became complete in 1712.

The Yamasee War (1715–1717) ravaged the back-country of the province. Complaints that the proprietors had not done enough to protect the provincials against either the Indians or the neighboring Spanish, during Queen Anne's War (1702–1713), convinced many residents of the necessity of ending proprietary rule. A rebellion broke out against the proprietors in 1719. Acting on a petition of residents, King George I appointed the governor of South Carolina later in that year (the governors of North Carolina would continue to be appointed by the lords proprietor until 1729). After nearly a decade in which the British monarchy sought to locate and buy out the lords, both North and South Carolina became royal colonies in 1729.

== Government ==
The Court of King's Bench and Common Pleas was founded c.1725, based in Charles Towne. List of Chief Justices:

Incumbent	Tenure		Notes
Incumbent	Took office	Left office	Notes
Edmund Bohun	1698	1699	died in office of fever
Nicholas Trott	c.1702	1718	dismissed from office after uprising
Richard Alleyn	1719		not sure
Robert Wright	1730	1739	died in office
Thomas Dale	17 Oct 1739	November 1739	not documented
Benjamin Whitaker	7 Nov 1739	1749	removed from office due to paralysis
James Graeme	6 Jul 1749	29 August 1752	died in office
Charles Pinckney	1752	1753	
Peter Leigh	1753		
James Michie	1 Sep 1759	16 July 1760	died in office, London, England
William Simpson	24 Jan 1761		
Charles Skinner	1762		
Thomas Knox Gordon	13 May 1771		
William Henry Drayton	13 Apr 1776		
John Rutledge	16 Feb 1791	1795	resigned and afterwards Chief Justice of the United States
after 1791 no further Chief Justices were appointed.

== Demographics ==
Population
Year	1720	1730	1740	1750	1760	1769	1770	1775
Pop.	17,048	30,000	45,000	64,000	94,074	125,000	124,244	150,000
±%	—	+76.0%	+50.0%	+42.2%	+47.0%	+32.9%	−0.6%	+20.7%
Source: 1720–1760; 1769–1775 1770–1775

== Notes ==
Preceded by Southern part of the Province of Carolina; 1663–1712	Province of South Carolina; 1712–1776	Succeeded by State of South Carolina; 1776–present
