= Jacksonville, Alabama =

City in Alabama, United States

- City
- City of Jacksonville
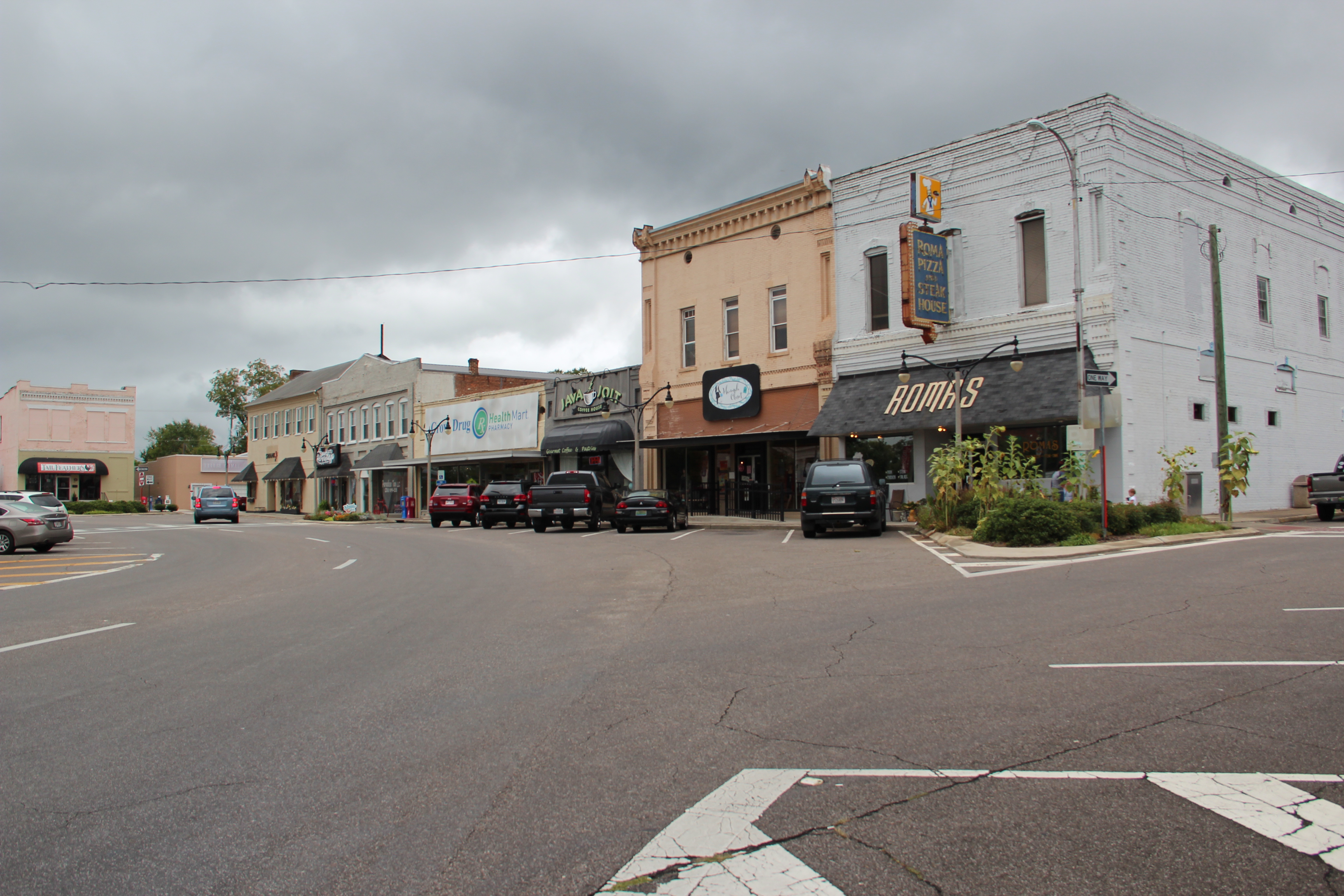
- Downtown Jacksonville Historic District

- Seal
- Motto: "Education – Commerce – Heritage"
- Location in Calhoun County and Alabama
- Coordinates: 33°47′42″N 85°44′10″W
- Country: United States
- State: Alabama
- County: Calhoun
- Founded: July 20, 1833 (193 years ago)
- Named for: Andrew Jackson

Government
  - Type: Mayor–Council
  - Council: Jacksonville City Council

Area
  - Total: 10.92 sq mi (28.28 km^{2})
  - Land: 10.91 sq mi (28.25 km^{2})
  - Water: 0.012 sq mi (0.03 km^{2})
- Elevation: 738 ft (225 m)

Population (2020)
  - Total: 14,385
  - Density: 1,318.8/sq mi (509.19/km^{2})
- Time zone: UTC-6 (Central (CST))
  - Summer (DST): UTC-5 (CDT)
- ZIP code: 36265
- Area code: 256
- FIPS code: 01-38272
- GNIS feature ID: 2404780
- Website: www.jacksonville-al.org

Jacksonville is a city in Calhoun County, Alabama, United States. As of the 2020 census the population was 14,385, which is a 14.6% increase since 2010 and a 71.2% increase since 2000. It is included in the Anniston-Oxford Metropolitan Statistical Area. The city is home to Jacksonville State University, which is a center of commerce and one of the largest employers in the area.

== History ==
Jacksonville was founded on July 20, 1833, on land purchased from Creek Indian Ho-bith Tus-tun-nuck-i.e., referred to as "Ladiga" by the men who bought the land. First called Drayton, the town was renamed to honor President Andrew Jackson in 1834. There are several Civil War monuments in town, including a statue of Major John Pelham in the city cemetery and a statue of a Confederate soldier in the middle of the square. Jacksonville served as the county seat for Calhoun County until the 20th century when the county seat moved to Anniston. Jacksonville State University was founded in the city in 1883.

An EF3 tornado hit Jacksonville on March 19, 2018, causing extensive damage to the city and the university of almost $42 million. The relatively low number of casualties – just four injuries – was attributed by some to the fact that the university was on spring break at the time. More than 1,000 volunteers assisted in the immediate tornado relief. Caleb Howard, then a senior at Jacksonville State University, said that "[i]t's been amazing to see the university and the community come together." Classes resumed at the university the following month. Although the university's usual site for graduation, Pete Mathews Coliseum, was damaged in the tornado along with over 20 other buildings, the first spring graduation since the tornado proceeded as scheduled on May 4 outside the football stadium. Dr. John Beeler, the university's president, said "It's a joyous event generally because you're celebrating the accomplishments of all your graduates, but it's an even more joyous event because to me it's a celebration of how far we've come in a short time in recovering from these tornadoes."

== Geography ==
Jacksonville is located in the foothills of the Appalachian Mountains. It lies in a valley between Choccolocco Mountain to the east and smaller ridges to the west.

According to the U.S. Census Bureau, the city has a total area of 9.8 square miles (25.5 km^{2}), of which 0.008 square miles (0.02 km^{2}), or 0.10%, is water.

=== Climate ===
Climate data for Jacksonville, Alabama (2004-2022 Precipitation only)
Month	Jan	Feb	Mar	Apr	May	Jun	Jul	Aug	Sep	Oct	Nov	Dec	Year
Average precipitation inches (mm)	4.69 (119)	5.33 (135)	5.61 (142)	4.77 (121)	4.54 (115)	4.63 (118)	4.36 (111)	4.12 (105)	3.00 (76)	3.07 (78)	3.85 (98)	5.35 (136)	53.32 (1,354)
Source: NOAA(National Weather Service)

== Demographics ==
Historical population
Census	Pop.	Note	%±
1850	716		—
1860	703		−1.8%
1870	958		36.3%
1880	882		−7.9%
1890	1,237		40.2%
1900	1,176		−4.9%
1910	2,231		89.7%
1920	2,395		7.4%
1930	2,840		18.6%
1940	2,995		5.5%
1950	4,751		58.6%
1960	5,678		19.5%
1970	7,715		35.9%
1980	9,735		26.2%
1990	10,283		5.6%
2000	8,404		−18.3%
2010	12,548		49.3%
2020	14,385		14.6%
U.S. Decennial Census

=== 2020 census ===
As of the 2020 census, Jacksonville had a population of 14,385. The median age was 24.2 years. 14.9% of residents were under the age of 18 and 12.5% were 65 years of age or older. For every 100 females there were 87.8 males, and for every 100 females age 18 and over there were 86.8 males age 18 and over.

98.1% of residents lived in urban areas, while 1.9% lived in rural areas.

There were 4,823 households and 2,472 families. Of all households, 25.7% had children under the age of 18 living in them. 33.5% were married-couple households, 22.6% were households with a male householder and no spouse or partner present, and 37.6% were households with a female householder and no spouse or partner present. About 35.4% of all households were made up of individuals and 11.5% had someone living alone who was 65 years of age or older.

There were 5,806 housing units, of which 16.9% were vacant. The homeowner vacancy rate was 2.1% and the rental vacancy rate was 15.2%.

Racial composition as of the 2020 census
Race	Number	Percent
White	7,946	55.2%
Black or African American	5,123	35.6%
American Indian and Alaska Native	28	0.2%
Asian	336	2.3%
Native Hawaiian and Other Pacific Islander	22	0.2%
Some other race	179	1.2%
Two or more races	751	5.2%
Hispanic or Latino (of any race)	453	3.1%

=== 2010 census ===
As of the census of 2010, there were 12,548 people, 4,917 households, and 2,466 families residing in the city. The population density was 1,275 inhabitants per square mile (492/km^{2}). There were 5,382 housing units at an average density of 546.4 per square mile (211.0/km^{2}). The racial makeup of the city was 68.7% White, 26.8% Black or African American, 0.5% Native American, 1.3% Asian, 0.2% Pacific Islander, 0.6% from other races, and 1.9% from two or more races. 2.3% of the population were Hispanic or Latino of any race.

There were 4,917 households, out of which 22.1% had children under the age of 18 living with them, 33.5% were married couples living together, marriage 13.0% had a female householder with no husband present, and 49.8% were non-families. 33.2% of all households were made up of individuals, and 8.7% had someone living alone who was 65 years of age or older. The average household size was 2.24 and the average family size was 2.91.

In the city, the age distribution of the population shows 17.2% under the age of 18, 32.6% from 18 to 24, 20.3% from 25 to 44, 18.4% from 45 to 64, and 11.5% who were 65 years of age or older. The median age was 25.1 years. For every 100 females, there were 87.6 males. For every 100 females age 18 and over, there were 89.6 males.

The median income for a household in the city was $33,987, and the median income for a family was $50,863. Males had a median income of $35,615 versus $26,975 for females. The per capita income for the city was $17,063. About 17.6% of families and 28.4% of the population were below the poverty line, including 29.1% of those under age 18 and 11.6% of those age 65 or over.

== Transportation ==
Two Alabama state routes pass through Jacksonville:

- State Route 21 (Pelham Road)
- State Route 204 (Rudy Abbott Highway)

== Education ==
Jacksonville is the home of Jacksonville State University, a public university with an enrollment of almost 10,000. It offers degrees in business, communication, education, family sciences, liberal arts and sciences, nursing and technology in addition to continuing education programs. The university's campus is located a few blocks north of the square.

Jacksonville is home to two public schools run by Jacksonville City Schools:

- Jacksonville High School (Grades 7–12).
- Kitty Stone Elementary School (Grades K-6).

There are also two public schools located northwest of the city proper that serve the unincorporated communities of Pleasant Valley and Williams and are run by Calhoun County Schools:

- Pleasant Valley High School
- Pleasant Valley Elementary School

There is also a private school, Jacksonville Christian Academy, located within the city.

The Calhoun County Center for the Arts offers classes through the Community Center.

== Media ==
Newspaper

- The Jacksonville News - Weekly, locally owned newspaper
- The Chanticleer - Student-run newspaper of Jacksonville State University

Magazine

- House to House Heart to Heart - Bi-monthly Christian magazine distributed through Churches of Christ; circulation over 2.5 million each issue

Television

- WJXS TV 24 - Local news, sports and programming

AM radio

- WCHA Alabama 810 - Local news, sports and Classic Country music

FM radio

- WLJS 91.9 - College radio, limited NPR station

== Notable people ==
- Rick Bragg, journalist and 1996 Pulitzer Prize for Feature Writing recipient
- Glen Browder, member of the U.S. House of Representatives from Alabama
- John Henry Caldwell, member of the U.S. House of Representatives from Alabama
- William Crutchfield, member of the U.S. House of Representatives from Tennessee
- Todd Cunningham, Major League Baseball player
- Sallie Curb Arnold, 20th-century artist
- John Horace Forney, Confederate States Army general
- William H. Forney, member of the U.S. House of Representatives from Alabama
- Riley Green, country music singer and songwriter
- James A. Haley, member of the U.S. House of Representatives from Florida
- Thomas C. Hindman, member of the U.S. House of Representatives from Arkansas and Confederate States Army general
- Harvey Jackson III, 21st-century historian
- Courtney LaPlante, lead vocalist of Spiritbox, lived there from the age of 6 to 15
- Lilly Ledbetter, activist and plaintiff in the U.S. Supreme Court case Ledbetter v. Goodyear Tire & Rubber Co.
- Shed Long, Major League Baseball player
- Darrell Malone, National Football League player
- Herman Clarence Nixon, 20th-century political scientist and member of the Southern Agrarians
- John Pelham, Confederate States Army officer
- Neel Reid, 20th-century architect
