= Jacksonville High School (Alabama) =

Public high school in Jacksonville, Alabama, United States

Location
- 1000 George Douthit Dr SW; Jacksonville, Alabama 36265; United States
- Coordinates: 33°49′13″N 85°45′45″W

Information
- School type: High school
- CEEB code: 011530
- Teaching staff: 47.50 (FTE)
- Grades: 7-12
- Enrollment: 756 (2024-2025)
- Student to teacher ratio: 15.92
- Colors: Navy blue and old gold
- Mascot: Golden Eagle
- Website: www.jacksonville-hs.org

Jacksonville High School is a public high school located in Jacksonville, Alabama, United States, serving grades 7–12. It is part of the Jacksonville City Schools system. Its colors are blue and gold.

Until 1998, the school was located adjacent to the Jacksonville State University campus on Pelham Road North. The current school building was built on part of the site of the former Jacksonville Airport.

== Notable alumni ==
- Rick Bragg (class of 1977): journalist for the Jacksonville News, Anniston Star, Birmingham News, St. Petersburg Times, and New York Times; won Pulitzer Prize in 1996 for coverage of Oklahoma City bombing for the New York Times.
- Lilly Ledbetter (class of 1956): plaintiff in Ledbetter v. Goodyear Tire & Rubber Co. United States Supreme Court case about pay discrimination; namesake in Lilly Ledbetter Fair Pay Act of 2009
- Darrell Malone (class of 1986): American football cornerback who played for Jacksonville State from 1987 to 1990 and in the NFL from 1992 to 1994
- Shed Long (class of 2012): Major League Baseball second baseman who is currently playing for the Seattle Mariners. He attended Jacksonville State University and played baseball. He was drafted by the Cincinnati Reds in 2016 but traded in 2019 to the Mariners.
- Todd Cunningham (class of 2007): Major League Baseball left fielder attended Jacksonville State University and played baseball for the Gamecocks. He was drafted in 2008 by the Atlanta Braves. He then was traded to the Los Angeles Angels and made his last MLB appearance in 2016 with the Angels.
- Riley Green (class of 2007): Country singer and songwriter with four top-20 hits on the Billboard Hot Country Songs and Country Airplay charts. He donated the costs to renovate the school's gym and cafeteria in 2023.
