= Lilly (2024 film) =

American drama film

- Theatrical release poster
- Directed by: Rachel Feldman
- Written by: Rachel Feldman; Adam Prince
- Based on: The life of Lilly Ledbetter; Grace and Grit by; Lilly Ledbetter; Lanier Scott Isom
- Produced by: Rachel Feldman; Allyn Stewart; Kelly E. Ashton; Kerianne Flynn; Jyoti Sarda; Simone Pero; J. Todd Harris; Christine Schwarzman; Julie Kaufman
- Starring: Patricia Clarkson; John Benjamin Hickey; Thomas Sadoski
- Cinematography: Noah Greenberg
- Edited by: Nancy Richardson; Joan Sobel
- Music by: Ariel Marx
- Production companies: Flashlight Films; New Plot Films; J. Todd Harris Productions
- Distributed by: Blue Harbor Entertainment
- Release dates: October 10, 2024 (Hamptons); May 9, 2025 (United States)
- Running time: 93 minutes
- Country: United States
- Language: English
- Box office: $170,436

Lilly is a 2024 American drama film produced and directed by Rachel Feldman and written by Feldman and Adam Prince. It stars Patricia Clarkson as Lilly Ledbetter as she battles the court case Ledbetter v. Goodyear Tire & Rubber Co. John Benjamin Hickey and Thomas Sadoski also star.

It premiered at the Hamptons International Film Festival on October 10, 2024, and was released on May 9, 2025, by Blue Harbor Entertainment.

== Premise ==
The movie follows Lilly Ledbetter and the groundbreaking Ledbetter v. Goodyear Tire & Rubber Co. case.

== Cast ==
- Patricia Clarkson as Lilly Ledbetter
- John Benjamin Hickey as Charles Ledbetter
- Thomas Sadoski as Jon Goldfarb
- Will Pullen as Phil Ledbetter
- Josh McDermitt as Dan McGinty
- Deirdre Lovejoy as Jocelyn Samuels
- Bethany Anne Lind as Vickie Ledbetter
- Keith Brooks as Andy Guthrie
- Paul Teal as Timothy Granger
- Amy Parrish as Deborah
- Rhoda Griffis as Marcia Greenberger
- Judd Lormand as Trevor Dawkins
- Robert Pralgo as Kent Kohler
- Darin Toonder as Jay St. Clair

== Production ==
In February 2013, it was announced Rachel Feldman would direct a film revolving around Lilly Ledbetter. Feldman connected with Ledbetter through Ledbetter's lawyer Jon Goldfarb. The project struggled to get off the ground for years. In February 2020, it was announced Meryl Streep would back the film, with J. Todd Harris joining as a producer. Streep turned down starring as Ledbetter, but offered to provide help to the producers.

In March 2021, it was announced Patricia Clarkson had joined the cast of the film. In August 2021, Josh Lucas and Thomas Sadoski joined the cast of the film. John Benjamin Hickey was later announced to be a part of the cast, with Lucas no longer attached. Production concluded by 2023.

== Release ==
The film had its world premiere at the Hamptons International Film Festival on October 10, 2024. Lilly Ledbetter died two days later, at the age of 86. In February 2025, Blue Harbor Entertainment acquired distribution rights to the film, and set it for a May 9, 2025, release. The film was added to Netflix on November 17, 2025.

== Reception ==
=== Critical reception ===
Patricia Clarkson received praise for her performance as Ledbetter. The film received criticism for its stylistic choices and editing. On the review aggregator website Rotten Tomatoes, 30% of 10 critics' reviews are positive.

Shawn Van Horn of Collider wrote: "Lilly becomes a chiseled-down Wikipedia summary version of a life, dipping in here and there to show you the big moments, but in the process, characterization and emotion are stripped away." Beatrice Loayza of The New York Times wrote: "Distracting pop-music needle drops and hammy performances give “Lilly” the feel of a Lifetime movie."
