= Women Employed =

US non-profit organization

Women Employed (WE)
- Founded: 1973
- Founder: Day Piercy
- Type: 501(c)(3)
- Location: Chicago, Illinois
- Website: womenemployed.org

Women Employed is a nonprofit advocacy organization based in Chicago, Illinois. Founded in 1973, Women Employed's mission is to improve women's economic status and remove barriers to economic equity. They promote fair workplace practices, increase access to training and education, and provide women with tools and information to move into careers paying family-supporting wages.

== History ==
In February 1973, a small group of Chicago women founded Women Employed (WE), through an initiative of the Loop YWCA. Organizers intended to mobilize networks of female workers around the common issues that affect their lives.

Women Employed's first major public event, attended by over 200 women, was a meeting of 26 of Chicago's leading corporations to discuss fair employment policies for women. In its first year, WE published Working Women in the Loop – Underpaid, Undervalued, an investigation that used 1970 U.S. Census data on wages and employment patterns to expose substantial inequalities between women and men. The study found that women made up 45% of downtown Chicago's labor force, yet earned only 25% of wages.

In the 1970s, Women Employed worked for economic equality alongside organizations in Chicago like the Coalition of Labor Union Women. During that time, Women Employed fought hiring and job discrimination for non-union women in the city. By organizing public and legal actions, WE influenced workplace practices by affecting the public's attitude toward equality for women. In 1977, WE led a series of public actions against the firing of Iris Rivera, a Chicago legal secretary who lost her job because she refused to make coffee for her boss. WE eventually got Rivera her job back.

In 1989, Women Employed helped women and minority employees of the Harris Trust and Savings Bank win $15 million in back pay, a record settlement for sexual and racial discrimination. Women Employed filed a complaint with the Federal Government against Harris in 1974 on the basis of Executive Order 11246. Prior to this case, companies were never forced to make payments surpassing $10 million in back wages for sex or racial discrimination cases. WE also worked with a national coalition to win passage of the federal Family and Medical Leave Act in 1993, which ensures employees up to 12 weeks of leave for medical purposes.

In 2003, WE helped pass the Illinois Equal Pay Act, which guarantees protection of equal pay for equal work to hundreds of thousands of workers not covered under the federal law. In 2006, WE helped win $34.4 million in funding for the Monetary Award Program (MAP) grant, making college more accessible to more than 150,000 low-income students in Illinois.

WE was part of a national coalition that advocated for the Lilly Ledbetter Fair Pay Act, the first women's rights legislation passed during the Obama administration. This law, signed in early 2009, increases employees' ability to fight pay discrimination.

In 2010, the US Department of Labor selected WE's Career Coach as a Top 10 Career Exploration Tool. Career Coach enables low-income, low-literacy adults to explore career options, define career goals, and identify local education and training resources.

== Current initiatives ==
=== Promoting fair workplaces ===
Despite many improvements in women's economic status over the past three decades, employment discrimination and unfairness in the workplace are still a fact of life for many women. On average, women make only 80 cents for every dollar a man makes, and can lose an immense amount of wages over a lifetime due to the wage gap which persists despite education level. A disproportionate number of women are clustered in low-paying, part-time jobs, often without benefits or dependable hours.

Women Employed promotes equal pay, fair workplace practices, and work-family balance. Women Employed also advocates for stronger anti-discrimination laws and equal employment opportunities in workplaces. As the leader of the Earned Sick Time Chicago Coalition, Women Employed played a leadership role in advocating for paid sick time ordinances in Chicago and Cook County. Those ordinances both passed in 2016, and went into effect on July 1, 2017. As the leader of the Illinois Paid Leave Coalition, WE works with a large number of organizations to expand and defen paid sick leave policies, including related to the COVID-19 pandemic.

=== Increasing access to education and training ===
Nearly 15 million women in the U.S. earn too little to cover basic living expenses for their families, despite working in full-time, year-round jobs. Education is one proven strategy for raising incomes. A woman with a two-year associate degree earns 28 percent more and a woman with a bachelor's degree earns 75 percent more than a woman with only a high school education.

Women Employed advocates to ensure high-quality postsecondary education programs and to increase access to supports that help women succeed in education and training.
