= Lilly Ledbetter =

American activist (1938–2024)

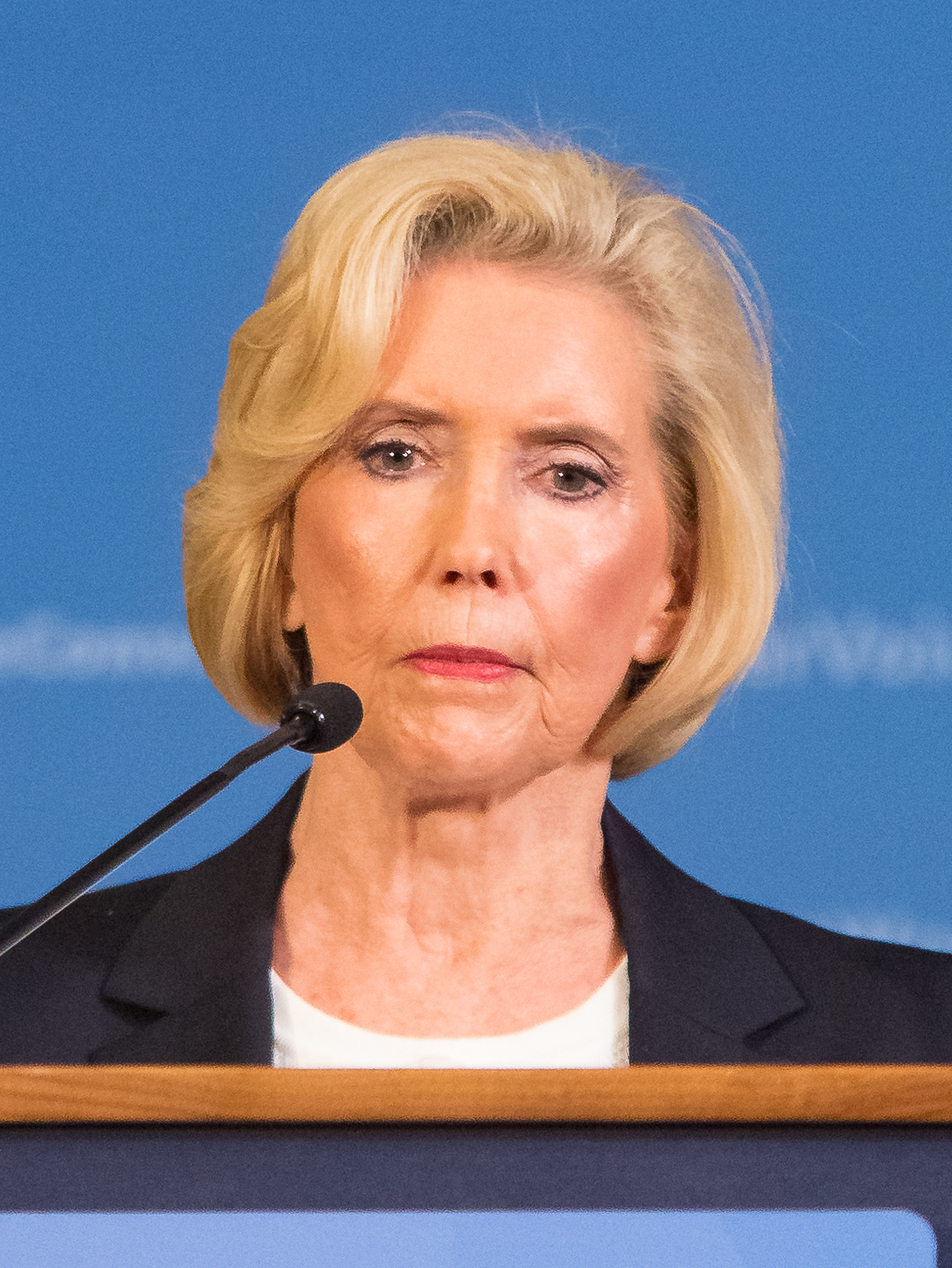
- Ledbetter in 2016
- Born: Lilly Lynn McDaniel; April 14, 1938; Possum Trot, Alabama, U.S.
- Died: October 12, 2024 (aged 86); Birmingham, Alabama, U.S.
- Known for: Ledbetter v. Goodyear Tire & Rubber Co.; Lilly Ledbetter Fair Pay Act of 2009
- Spouse: Charles Ledbetter (m. 1956; died 2008)
- Children: 2

Lilly Lynn McDaniel Ledbetter (April 14, 1938 – October 12, 2024) was an American activist who was the plaintiff in the United States Supreme Court case Ledbetter v. Goodyear Tire & Rubber Co. regarding employment discrimination. Two years after the Supreme Court decided that Title VII of the Civil Rights Act of 1964 does not allow employers to be sued for pay discrimination more than 180 days after an employee's first paycheck, the United States Congress passed a fair pay act in her name to remedy this issue, the Lilly Ledbetter Fair Pay Act of 2009. Subsequently, she became a women's equality activist, public speaker, and author. In 2011, Ledbetter was inducted into the National Women's Hall of Fame.

== Personal life ==
Ledbetter was born Lilly Lynn McDaniel in Possum Trot, Alabama, on April 14, 1938, and grew up in nearby Jacksonville, Alabama. She graduated from Jacksonville High School in 1956. Her father J.C. McDaniel was a mechanic at the Anniston Army Depot. After graduating from high school, Lilly McDaniel married Charles Ledbetter and had two children, Vicky and Phillip. She remained married until Charles's death in December 2008. Ledbetter worked at Jacksonville State University in Jacksonville, Alabama, as the assistant director of financial aid.

On October 12, 2024, Ledbetter died from respiratory failure at a hospital in Birmingham, Alabama, at the age of 86.

== Ledbetter v. Goodyear Tire & Rubber Co. ==
In 1979, Lilly Ledbetter was hired by Goodyear, working as a supervisor. After working for Goodyear for 19 years and nearing retirement, she received an anonymous note revealing that she was making thousands less per year than the men in her position. Had her pay raises remained consistent with those given to the male employees, she would have made over $200,000 more over the course of her career than she actually had.

As a result, Ledbetter filed a sex discrimination lawsuit against Goodyear. She initially won her case, but the judgment was reversed on appeal by the United States Court of Appeals for the Eleventh Circuit. The lawsuit eventually reached the U.S. Supreme Court, which ruled against her because she did not file suit 180 days from the date of the discriminatory policy that led to her reduced paycheck, though the paycheck itself was issued during the 180-day period. The Supreme Court did not consider the issue of whether a plaintiff's late discovery of a discriminatory action would excuse a failure to file within the 180-day period because her attorneys conceded it would have made no difference in her case. In dissent, United States Supreme Court Justice Ruth Bader Ginsburg wrote:

Lilly Ledbetter was a supervisor at Goodyear Tire and Rubber's plant in Gadsden, Alabama, from 1979 until her retirement in 1998. For most of those years, she worked as an area manager, a position largely occupied by men. Initially, Ledbetter's salary was in line with the salaries of men performing substantially similar work. Over time, however, her pay slipped in comparison to the pay of male area managers with equal or less seniority. By the end of 1997, Ledbetter was the only woman working as an area manager and the pay discrepancy between Ledbetter and her 15 male counterparts was stark: Ledbetter was paid $3,727 per month; the lowest paid male area manager received $4,286 per month, the highest paid, $5,236.

== Lilly Ledbetter Fair Pay Act of 2009 ==
Subsequently, the 111th United States Congress passed the Lilly Ledbetter Fair Pay Act in 2009 to loosen the timeliness requirements for the filing of a discrimination suit so long as any act of discrimination, including receipt of a paycheck that reflects a past act of discrimination, occurs within the 180-day period of limitations. The act sought to reverse the Supreme Court's ruling in Ledbetter v. Goodyear, which restricted the time period for filing pay discrimination claims, making it more difficult for workers to file a complaint.

Passage of the act did not result in Ledbetter receiving a settlement from Goodyear. Although she did not receive restitution from Goodyear, she said, "I'll be happy if the last thing they say about me after I die is that I made a difference."

The Lilly Ledbetter Fair Pay Act was President Barack Obama's first official piece of legislation as president. He said: "When I came into office, we passed something called the Lilly Ledbetter Act, named after a good friend of mine, Lilly Ledbetter, who had worked for years and found out long into her work that she had been getting paid all these years less than men, substantially. She brought suit. They said, well, it's too late to file suit because you should have filed suit right when it started happening. She said, I just found out. They said, it doesn't matter. So we changed that law to allow somebody like Lilly, when they find out, to finally be able to go ahead and file suit."

By 2011, over 350 cases had already cited the Ledbetter decision since it was handed down in 2009.

Ruth Bader Ginsburg had a framed copy of the bill, Lilly Ledbetter Fair Pay Act, in her chambers.

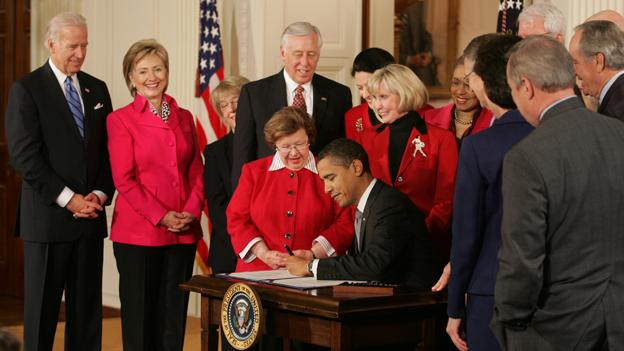
President Obama signing the Lilly Ledbetter Fair Pay Act of 2009. Ledbetter is to the viewer's right of President Obama.

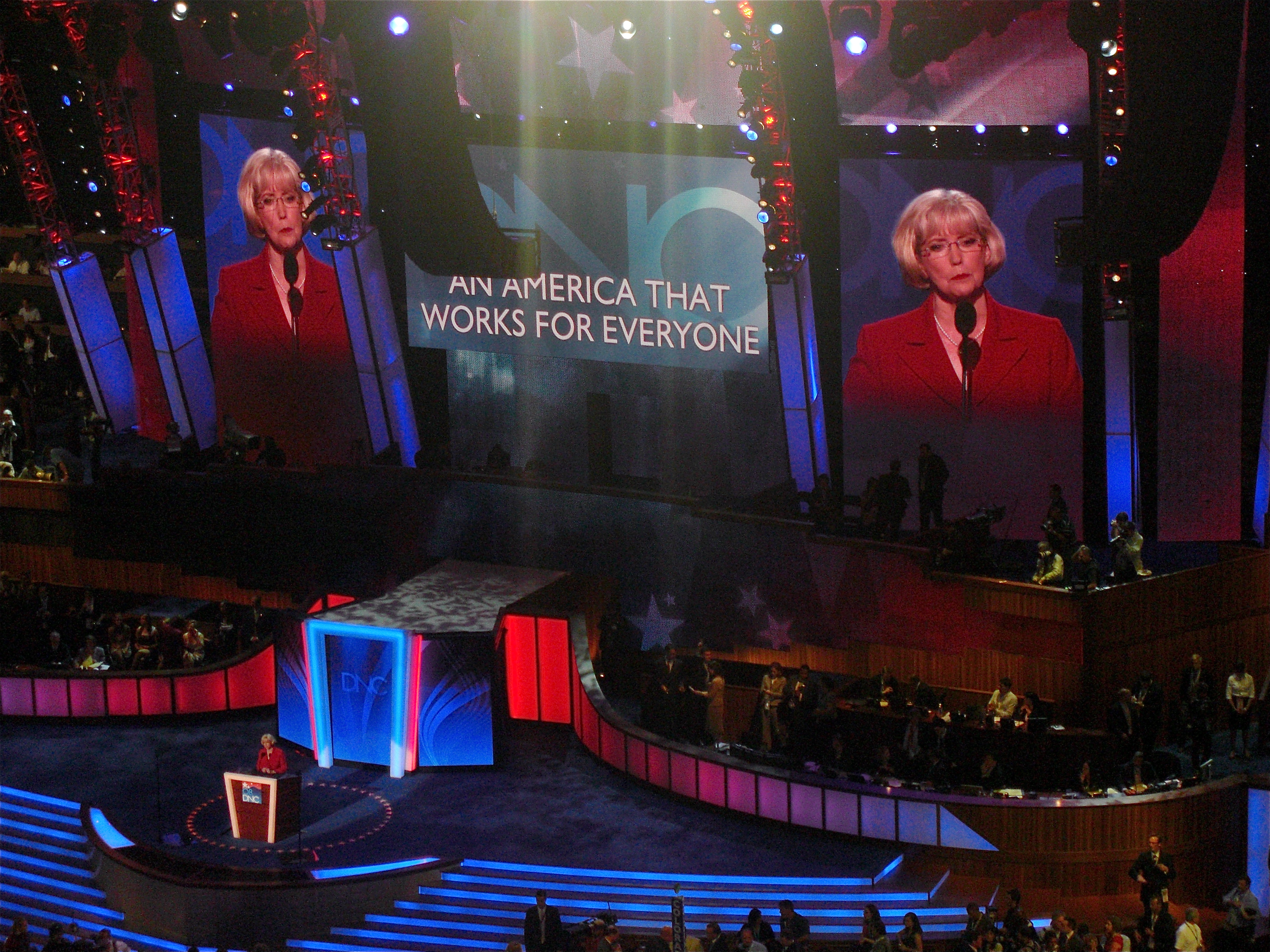
Ledbetter speaks during the second day of the 2008 Democratic National Convention in Denver, Colorado.

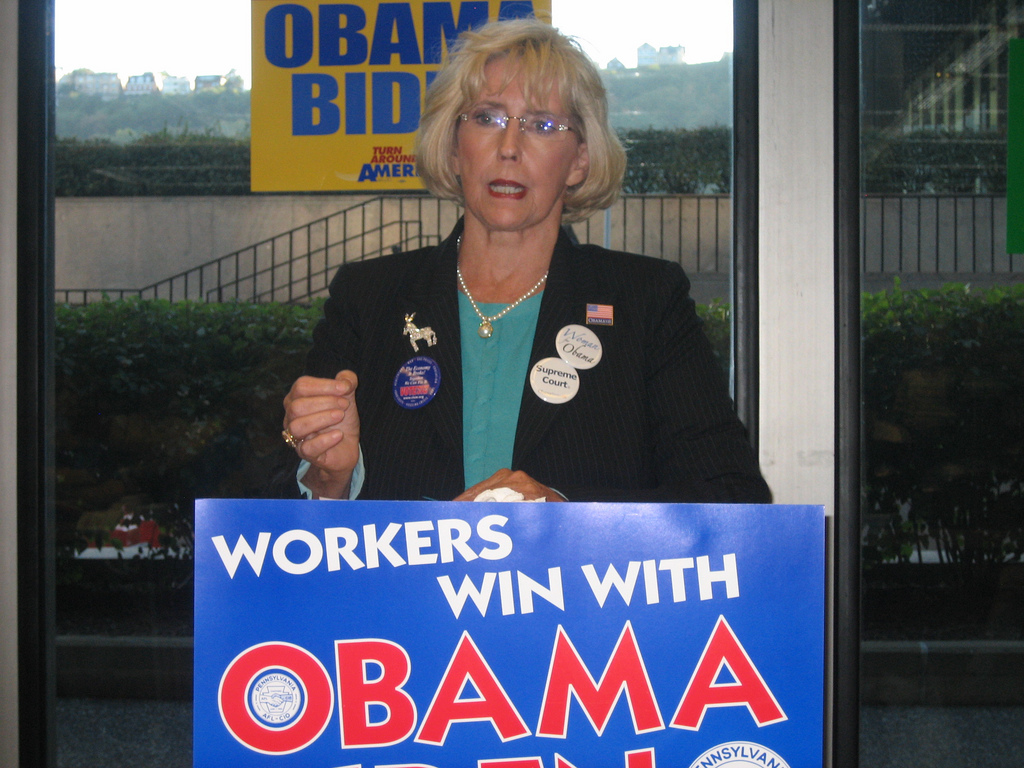
Ledbetter promoting Barack Obama for working-class families in Pennsylvania for his presidential campaign in 2008.

== Women's equality activism and legacy ==
On August 26, 2008 (Women's Equality Day), Ledbetter spoke at the Democratic National Convention in Denver, Colorado, on the topic of pay equality.

In February 2013, Ledbetter released Grace and Grit: My Fight for Equal Pay and Fairness at Goodyear and Beyond, a memoir detailing her struggle for equal pay. Her book chronicles her life from her humble beginnings in Alabama to the passage of the Lilly Ledbetter Fair Pay Act, signed by President Obama in 2009. On October 31, 2012, Lilly Ledbetter appeared as a guest on the Colbert Report to promote the book.

On September 4, 2012, she spoke at the Democratic National Convention in Charlotte, North Carolina. She said, "This cause, which bears my name, is bigger than me. It's as big as all of you. This fight, which began as my own, is now our fight—a fight for the fundamental American values that make our country great." Ledbetter also declared that "what we lose can't just be measured in dollars."

In 2019, Time created 89 new covers to celebrate women of the year starting from 1920; it chose Ledbetter for 2007.

Ledbetter's story was dramatized in the 2024 film Lilly, in which she is played by Patricia Clarkson. The film premiered at the Hamptons International Film Festival on October 10, 2024, two days before Ledbetter's death.

She was the 'question' in the season 41, episode 41, program Jeopardy! aired November 4, 2024, just 23 days after her death.

== Books ==
- Ledbetter, Lilly & Isom, Lanier Scott (2012). Grace and Grit: My Fight for Equal Pay and Fairness at Goodyear and Beyond. Crown Archetype. ISBN 978-0307887924.
