= Darrell Malone =

American football player (born 1967)

No. 47
- Position: Cornerback

Personal information
- Born: November 23, 1967 (age 58); Mobile, Alabama, U.S.
- Listed height: 5 ft 10 in (1.78 m)
- Listed weight: 177 lb (80 kg)

Career information
- High school: Jacksonville (Jacksonville, Alabama)
- College: Jacksonville State
- NFL draft: 1991: 6th round, 162nd overall pick

Career history
- Kansas City Chiefs (1991)*; Tampa Bay Buccaneers (1991)*; New Orleans Saints (1991)*; Kansas City Chiefs (1992); Miami Dolphins (1992–1994)
- * Offseason or practice squad member only

Career NFL statistics
- Tackles: 25
- Interceptions: 1
- Stats at Pro Football Reference

Darrell Kenyatta Malone (born November 23, 1967) is an American former professional football player who was a cornerback in the National Football League (NFL). He played college football for the Jacksonville State Gamecocks. Malone was selected by the Kansas City Chiefs in the sixth round of the 1991 NFL draft. He played for the Chiefs in 1992 and the Miami Dolphins from 1992 to 1994.
