= Fort Okfuskee =

United States historic site in Alabama

- Near Our Town, Alabama in United States
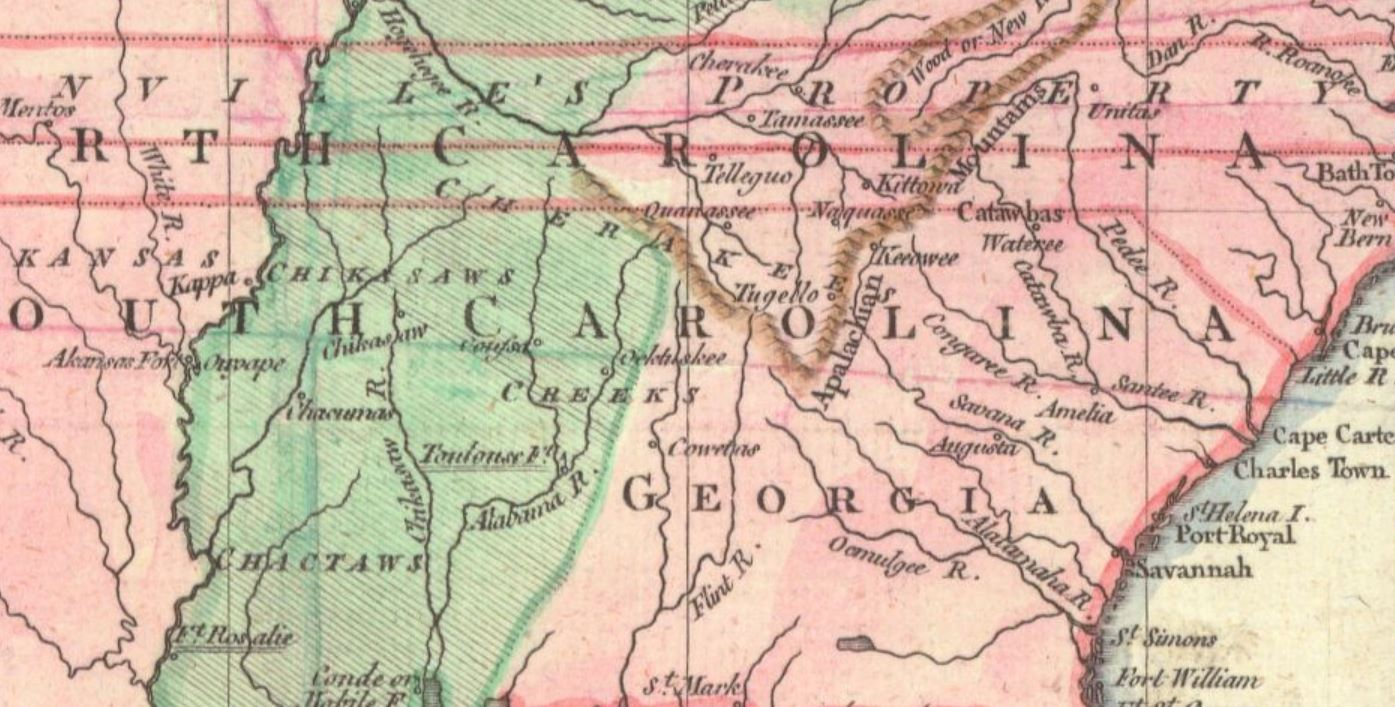
- John Lodge 1754 map showing the location of Okfuskee (spelled Ockfuskee in center of image)

Site information
- Type: Stockade fort
- Owner: Private
- Controlled by: Private
- Open to the public: No
- Condition: Submerged

Location
- Location within Alabama Location within the United States
- Coordinates: 32°48′32″N 85°53′54″W

Site history
- Built: 1735, 1744
- Built by: Province of Georgia traders (first fort), Province of South Carolina traders (second fort)
- In use: 1735-1743, 1744-1745

Fort Okfuskee (also spelled Ofuski or Oakfuskee) was the name of two separate forts built by Great Britain in what is now Tallapoosa County, Alabama. The first fort was built to ensure British trade with the Creek Indians after the French constructed Fort Toulouse. The fort was abandoned a little over a decade after construction after facing difficulties in being supplied. A second Fort Okfuskee was built a year later, but was abandoned in less than a year due to lack of colonial support.

== History ==
=== Background ===
Soon after Europeans arrived in the present-day southeastern United States, Native Americans began trading deerskins and slaves for European goods and weapons. The Creek Indians initially traded with Spanish and French colonists, but eventually established trade with the British from the Province of South Carolina and Province of Georgia.

To protect their trade interests and prevent other European encroachment, the French built Fort Toulouse in 1717 at the confluence of the Coosa and Tallapoosa Rivers. The British realized the need for continued trade with the Creeks and other Native Americans to ensure a supply of deerskins and warriors to fight other European powers. By 1722, the British had established a factory at the Creek town of Okfuskee on the Tallapoosa River. In the 1700s, Okfuskee was one of the largest Creek towns and the destination of many British traders. The town occupied both sides of the Tallapoosa River and owed its size to the fact that it lay at the intersection of two major routes, the Upper Trading Path that connected it to Charleston and the Okfuskee Trail that connected it to Savannah. The Upper Trading Path continued westward, connecting Okfuskee with the Chickasaw tribe. As early as 1727, South Carolina considered constructing a fort to protect their trade interests in Okfuskee.

After the formation of the Province of Georgia in 1732, Georgia claimed exclusive rights to trade with the Creeks. In doing so, Georgia sought to exclude traders from the Province of South Carolina from contact with the Creeks in the surrounding area. In addition to their trade relationship with the Creeks, the British also traded with one of the Creek's rivals, the Chickasaws. To strengthen their relationship with the Chickasaws, the British planned to attack Fort Toulouse. After meeting with the Creeks, the British demanded the Creeks either destroy Fort Toulouse or allow the British to construct their own fort on Creek land. The Creeks relented to the British demand for a fort, and Georgia's James Oglethorpe dispatched Patrick McKay and other men to expel "unlicensed" traders from Creek lands.

=== Georgia fort ===
After meeting with Okfuskee villagers in 1735, Georgia rangers were left to construct and garrison the new fort. The fort, referred to as Fort Okfuskee, was likely a palisade constructed around a trade house. Fort Okfuskee was built on the west side of the Tallapoosa opposite the village of Okfuskee. McKay's second-in-command, Lieutenant Anthony Willey (also spelled Willy), was placed in charge of the construction of Fort Okfuskee. Willey had previously served at Fort Moore prior to traveling with McKay. Willey and two to three other soldiers arranged trades with the Creeks and monitored other traders in the surrounding area until 1742. Even though they were monitored, the Creeks still conducted trade with agents from South Carolina, including a trader named Alexander Wood.

In 1742, Oglethorpe sent Captain Richard Kent to relieve Willey of command of Fort Okfuskee. Kent, the senior ranger officer in Georgia and commander of the Augusta Regiment, arrived at Fort Okfuskee with three other men. Kent and his soldiers remained at Fort Okfuskee until June 1743, after which Fort Okfuskee was abandoned by the Georgians.

=== South Carolina fort ===
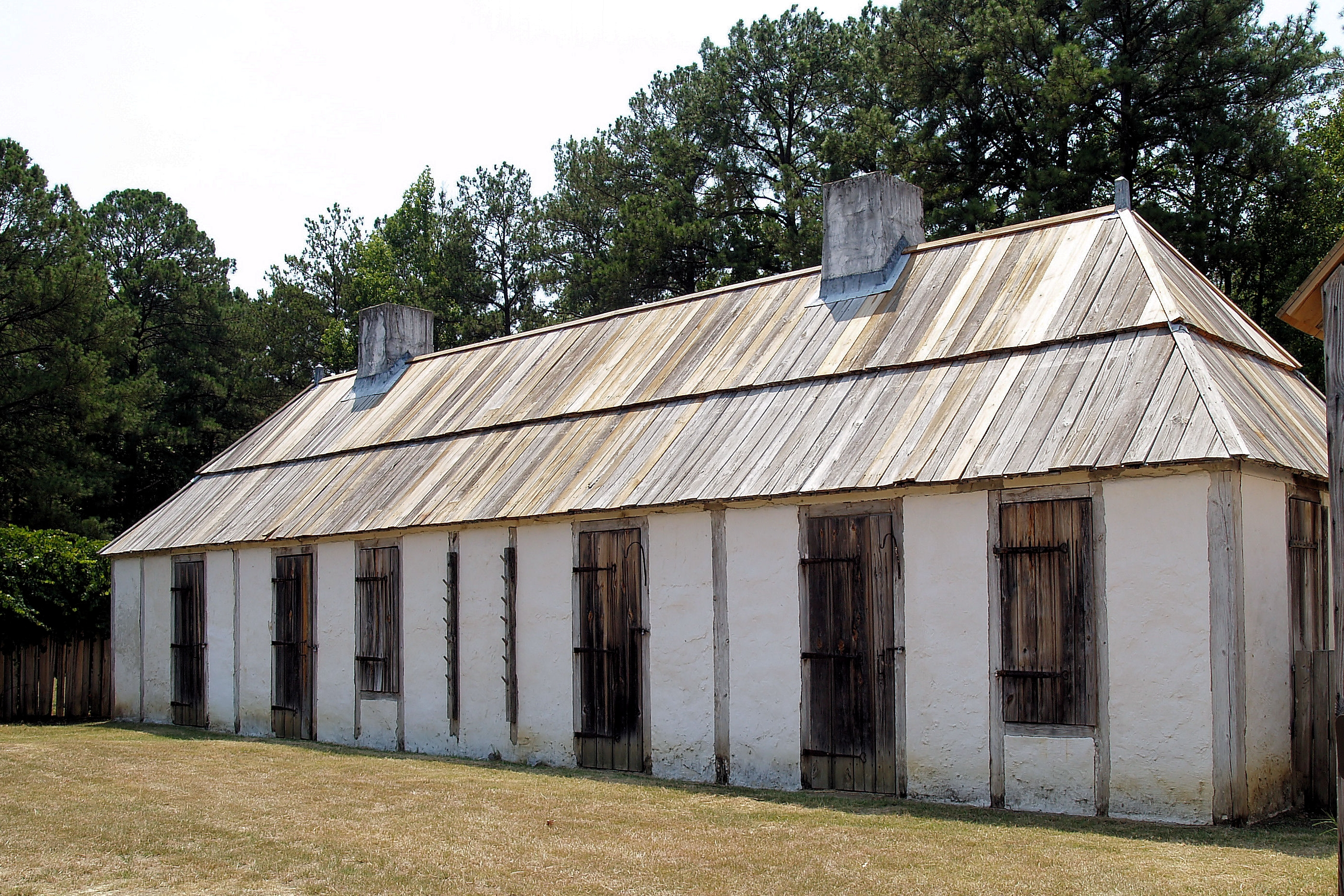
Modern reconstruction of Fort Toulouse as it possibly appeared when in use by the French

After Georgia abandoned Fort Okfuskee, South Carolina continued to trade with the Creeks in Okfuskee. In 1743, representatives from Okfuskee visited Charleston to request assistance from the British in ending a war with the Cherokee. During this trip, the Creeks consented to South Carolina building a second fort in Okfuskee. Lieutenant Governor William Bull instructed Wood (now with the title of Captain), to construct the fort.

The Governor of French Louisiana, Pierre de Rigaud, marquis de Vaudreuil-Cavagnial, learned of South Carolina's desire to construct a new fort at Okfuskee. Vaudreuil demanded that the commandant of Fort Toulouse notify the Abihka and Tallapoosas that the French would withdraw trade from Fort Toulouse if they did not refuse to help build the new fort and destroy any constructed portions. Despite these demands, the French continued to trade with the citizens of Okfuskee to ensure their cooperation. The French ordered coats and limburg cloth (a trade fabric from the province of Limburg in the Netherlands that was usually dyed blue or scarlet), to use as trade items with the Creeks.

Most sources list Captain Wood as leading construction of the second Fort Okfuskee, but some sources list a trader named Dubois as being responsible for its construction. The fort was constructed from March to May 1744. The fort was described as a "house surrounded by a stockade" and was enclosed by a 150-square-foot palisade. This second fort was likely similar in appearance to the stockaded trading house found at Ocmulgee Old Fields. Lieutenant Governor Bull sought funding for the fort, but the South Carolina Commons House of Assembly thought it would be too costly to supply the fort and provide it with any cannons. The House also debated if Fort Okfuskee should even have a permanent garrison or just serve as a temporary refuge for traders. As a consequence, the second Fort Okfuskee was barely supplied and soldiers there were responsible for their own food and clothing.

By 1745, Fort Okfuskee was described by traders and other Europeans as being totally abandoned and in disrepair. Prior to its abandonment, a portion of the fort was burned.

=== Present day ===
The site of Fort Okfuskee was inundated when the Tallapoosa River was dammed in the creation of Lake Martin in 1926. A historical marker describing Fort Okfuskee is located near Alexander City on U.S. Route 280.

== Sources ==
- Brannon, Peter A. (1924). "Fort Ofuski". Arrow Points: Monthly Bulletin of the Alabama Anthropological Society. 8 (4).
- Cashin, Edward J. (2006). "6: Oglethorpe's Contest for the Backcountry, 1733-1749". In Spalding, Phinizy; Jackson, Harvey H. (eds.). Oglethorpe in Perspective: Georgia's Founder After Two Hundred Years. Tuscaloosa, Alabama: University of Alabama Press. ISBN 0-8173-0386-3.
- Harris, W. Stuart (1977). Dead Towns of Alabama. Tuscaloosa, Alabama: University of Alabama Press. ISBN 0-8173-1125-4.
- Piker, Joshua A. (2004). Okfuskee: A Creek Indian Town in Colonial America. Cambridge, Massachusetts: Harvard University Press. ISBN 0-674-01335-2.
- Roberts, Robert B. (1988). Encyclopedia of Historic Forts. New York, New York: Macmillan. ISBN 0-02-926880-X.
- Rowland, Dunbar; Sanders, A. G., eds. (1927). Mississippi Provincial Archives, 1729-1740. Jackson, Mississippi: Mississippi Department of Archives and History.
- Thomas, Daniel H. (1989). Fort Toulouse: The French Outpost at the Alabamas on the Coose. Tuscaloosa, Alabama: University of Alabama Press. ISBN 0-8173-0421-5.
- Waselkov, Gregory A.; Wood, Brian M.; Herbert, Joseph M. (1982). Colonization and Conquest: The 1980 Archaeological Excavations at Fort Toulouse and Fort Jackson, Alabama. Montgomery, Alabama: Auburn University at Montgomery.
- Wood, Brian M. (1984). "Fort Okfuskee: A British Challenge to Fort Toulouse aux Alibamons". In Waselkov, Gregory A. (ed.). Fort Toulouse Studies. Montgomery, Alabama: Auburn University at Montgomery.
- Wright, Amos J. Jr. (2003). Historic Indian Towns in Alabama, 1540-1838. University of Alabama Press. ISBN 0-8173-1251-X.
