= Menawa =

Muscogee (Creek) chief and military leader

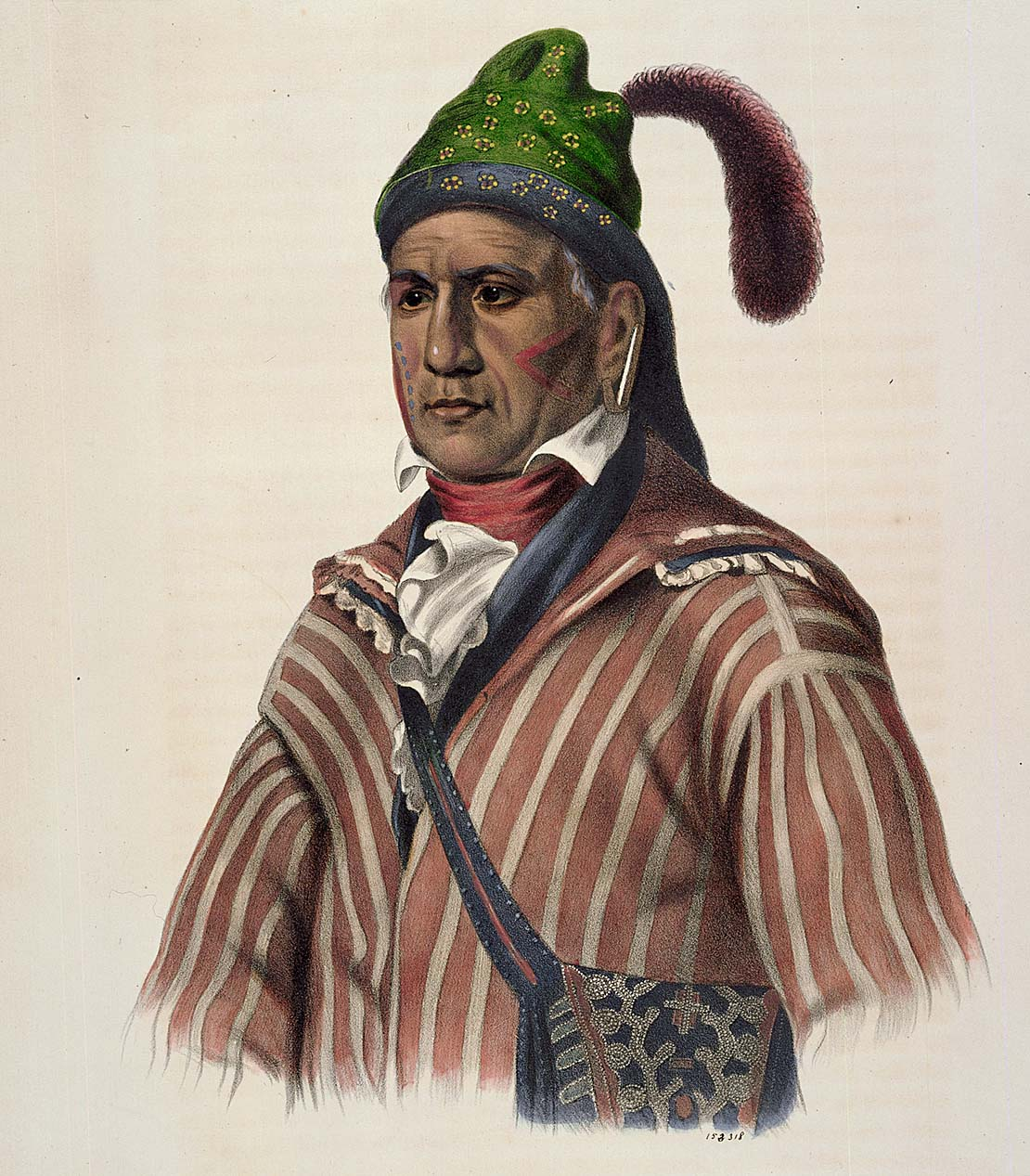
- Born: Okfuskee
- Occupation: Tribal chief

Menawa, first called Hothlepoya (c. 1765 – c. 1836–40), was a Muscogee (Creek) chief and military leader. He was of mixed race, with a Creek mother and a fur trader father of Scottish ancestry. As the Creek had a matrilineal system of descent and leadership, his status came from his mother's clan.

He grew up among the Upper Creek in present-day Alabama and, as an adult, became part of the "Red Sticks", a group that opposed assimilation and worked to revive traditional practices. During the Creek War (1813–1814), he led Red Sticks warriors and survived the Battle of Horseshoe Bend. To carry out punishment for the crime of an unauthorized land cession, in 1825 Menawa led about 150 lawmenders in an attack on chief William McIntosh, who had signed the Treaty of Indian Springs that year without the consent of the Creek National Council. They killed him, burned his mansion, and confiscated his property, including livestock and 100 slaves.

== Early life and education ==
He was born at the village of Oakfuskee, located on the Tallapoosa River in present-day Alabama. The site is now covered by the lower part of Lake Martin, created by a dam.

His mother was a high-status Creek woman and his father a mostly Scots fur trader; such strategic alliances were common, as both cultures believed they benefited. As the Creek were matrilineal, Menawa was reared within the Creek tribe and gained his status from his mother's clan. Her eldest brother would have acted as his mentor, teaching him men's ways and introducing him to the men's societies.

== Career ==
When Hothlepoya became the second chief of Oakfuskee, he was given the name Menawa.

During the early 1800s, he was one of the principal leaders of the "Red Sticks" or Upper Creeks, who worked to revive traditional practices and resisted assimilation to European-American ways. He emerged to lead warriors in the Creek War (1813–1814), which began as a civil war among the Creek people, where strong divisions had arisen with the Lower Creek, who comprised the majority of the population. During this period, the British were already at war against the United States during the War of 1812. They supported the Red Sticks' resistance to United States settlers' incursions into their territory.

Menawa was second in command of the Red Sticks at the Battle of Horseshoe Bend in 1814, when they were defeated by General Andrew Jackson commanding militias of Tennessee, Georgia and the Mississippi Territory, as well as allied Cherokee. Menawa was wounded seven times during the battle, but he escaped and survived his wounds.

After the war, Menawa continued to oppose the European-American encroachment on Creek lands. Lower Creek chiefs had ceded town lands in 1790, 1802 and 1804. In 1825, Chief William McIntosh, a Lower Creek, was one of several chiefs who signed the Treaty of Indian Springs with the US, ceding most of the remaining Creek land east of the Mississippi River. The tribe had been under severe pressure from Georgia, but the Upper Creek, the majority, continued to oppose such cessions. The Creek National Council had passed a law declaring land cessions a capital crime, and declared the signers of the 1825 treaty to be traitors. It ordered their execution.

On April 30, 1825, Menawa led a party of 120-150 lawmenders from towns of the ceded land; they executed chief William McIntosh, and Etommee Tustunnuggee, who had alienated communal Creek land without the consent of the National Council. They burned down McIntosh's mansion at Indian Springs, and confiscated his 100 slaves, livestock and produce. Later that day they caught Samuel and Benjamin Hawkins, his sons-in-law and also signatories to the treaty. They hanged Samuel and shot Benjamin, but he escaped.

In 1826, Menawa was a member of the Creek National Council, along with Opothleyahola and Selocta Chinnabby, that went to Washington D.C., to protest the Treaty of Indian Springs. The Creek leaders signed the Treaty of Washington (1826) with the US government, which nullified the Treaty of Indian Springs. In this new treaty, the Creek still ceded land to Georgia—in compensation, they received an immediate payment of $217,660 and a perpetual annuity of $20,000. The state of Georgia ignored the new treaty and worked to evict the Creek from their lands.

Menawa is said to have been among the hundreds who died during the general removal of the Creek to Indian Territory in the 1830s. According to the memoirs of Lt Edward Deas, who led the third detachment of 2,420 Creeks from Alabama to Oklahoma, Menawa is said to have been alive on December 21, 1836 in Little Rock, Arkansas. According to Deas, "The land party eventually arrived near Little Rock but Tuscoona Harjo, Menawa, and four hundred of their people, refused to travel much farther beyond that that. Menawa was too intoxicated to travel while Harho 'evinced a stubborn obstinate disposition.' " Menawa is not listed on the muster rolls after the group reached Fort Gibson in Indian Territory on January 23, 1837.

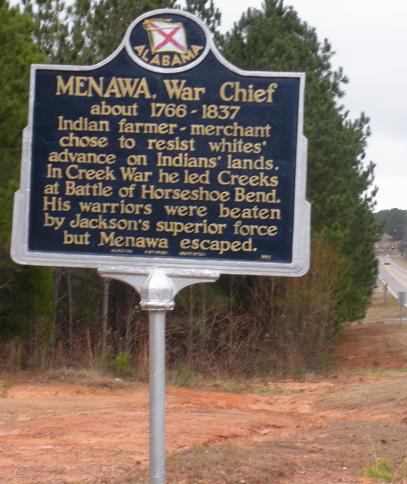
A historic marker near Lake Martin, Alabama notes the significance of Menawa.
