= Lilly Ledbetter Fair Pay Act of 2009 =

Federal statute in the United States

- Long title: An Act to amend title VII of the Civil Rights Act of 1964 and the Age Discrimination in Employment Act of 1967, and to modify the operation of the Americans with Disabilities Act of 1990 and the Rehabilitation Act of 1973, to clarify that a discriminatory compensation decision or other practice that is unlawful under such Acts occurs each time compensation is paid pursuant to the discriminatory compensation decision or other practice, and for other purposes.
- Enacted by: the 111th United States Congress
- Effective: January 29, 2009

Citations
- Public law: 111-2
- Statutes at Large: 123 Stat. 5

Codification
- Acts amended: Civil Rights Act of 1964; Age Discrimination in Employment Act of 1967
- Titles amended: 29, 42

Legislative history
- Introduced in the Senate as S. 181 by Barbara Mikulski (D–MD) on January 8, 2009; Passed the Senate on January 22, 2009 (61-36); Passed the House on January 27, 2009 (250-177); Signed into law by President Barack Obama on January 29, 2009

The Lilly Ledbetter Fair Pay Act of 2009 (Pub. L. 111–2 (text) (PDF), S. 181) is a landmark federal statute in the United States that was the first bill signed into law by U.S. President Barack Obama on January 29, 2009. The act amends Title VII of the Civil Rights Act of 1964 and states that the 180-day statute of limitations for filing an equal-pay lawsuit regarding pay discrimination resets with each new paycheck affected by that discriminatory action. The law directly addressed Ledbetter v. Goodyear Tire & Rubber Co. (2007), a U.S. Supreme Court decision that the statute of limitations for presenting an equal-pay lawsuit begins on the date that the employer makes the initial discriminatory wage decision, not at the date of the most recent paycheck.

An earlier bill seeking to supersede the Ledbetter decision, also called the Lilly Ledbetter Fair Pay Act, was first introduced in the 110th United States Congress, but was not successfully enacted at that time, as it was passed by the House but failed in the Senate.

During the campaign for the 2008 elections, the Democrats criticized Republicans for defeating the 2007 version of the bill, citing Republican presidential candidate John McCain's opposition to the bill and candidate Barack Obama's support.

== Court rulings ==
The antecedents of the case were posed when Lilly Ledbetter, a production supervisor at a Goodyear tire plant in Alabama, filed an equal-pay lawsuit regarding pay discrimination under Title VII of the Civil Rights Act of 1964 with the Equal Employment Opportunity Commission, six months before her early retirement in 1998. Initially, the jury found for Ms. Ledbetter, awarding her $3 million, which was reduced to $360,000 due to a Title VII damage cap. But the appeals court reversed this ruling. The plaintiffs then appealed to the Supreme Court. The latter ruled in 2007 by a 5–4 majority vote that Ledbetter's complaint was time-barred because the discriminatory decisions relating to pay had been made more than 180 days prior to the date she filed her charge, as explained by Justice Samuel Alito. Justice Ruth Bader Ginsburg's dissenting opinion proposed an interpretation according to which the law runs from the date of any paycheck that contains an amount affected by a prior discriminatory pay decision.

The Ledbetter decision was cited by federal judges in 300 cases before the LLFPA was passed. These cases involved not only Title VII of the Civil Rights Act, but also the Age Discrimination in Employment Act of 1967, Fair Housing Act, Patsy T. Mink Equal Opportunity in Education Act and Eighth Amendment to the Constitution.

Among the first to criticize the Court's decision that Ledbetter's complaint was time-barred was Marcia Greenberger, president of the National Women's Law Center, that saw in the ruling a "setback for women and a setback for civil rights" and called Ginsburg's opinion a "clarion call to the American people that this slim majority of the court is headed in the wrong direction." Debra L. Ness, president of the National Partnership for Women & Families, also condemned the decision, saying, "If employers can keep the discrimination hidden for a period of time, they can continue to discriminate without being held accountable." On the other side, the majority's findings were applauded by the U.S. Chamber of Commerce, that called it a "fair decision" that "eliminates a potential wind-fall against employers by employees trying to dredge up stale pay claims."

== The bill ==
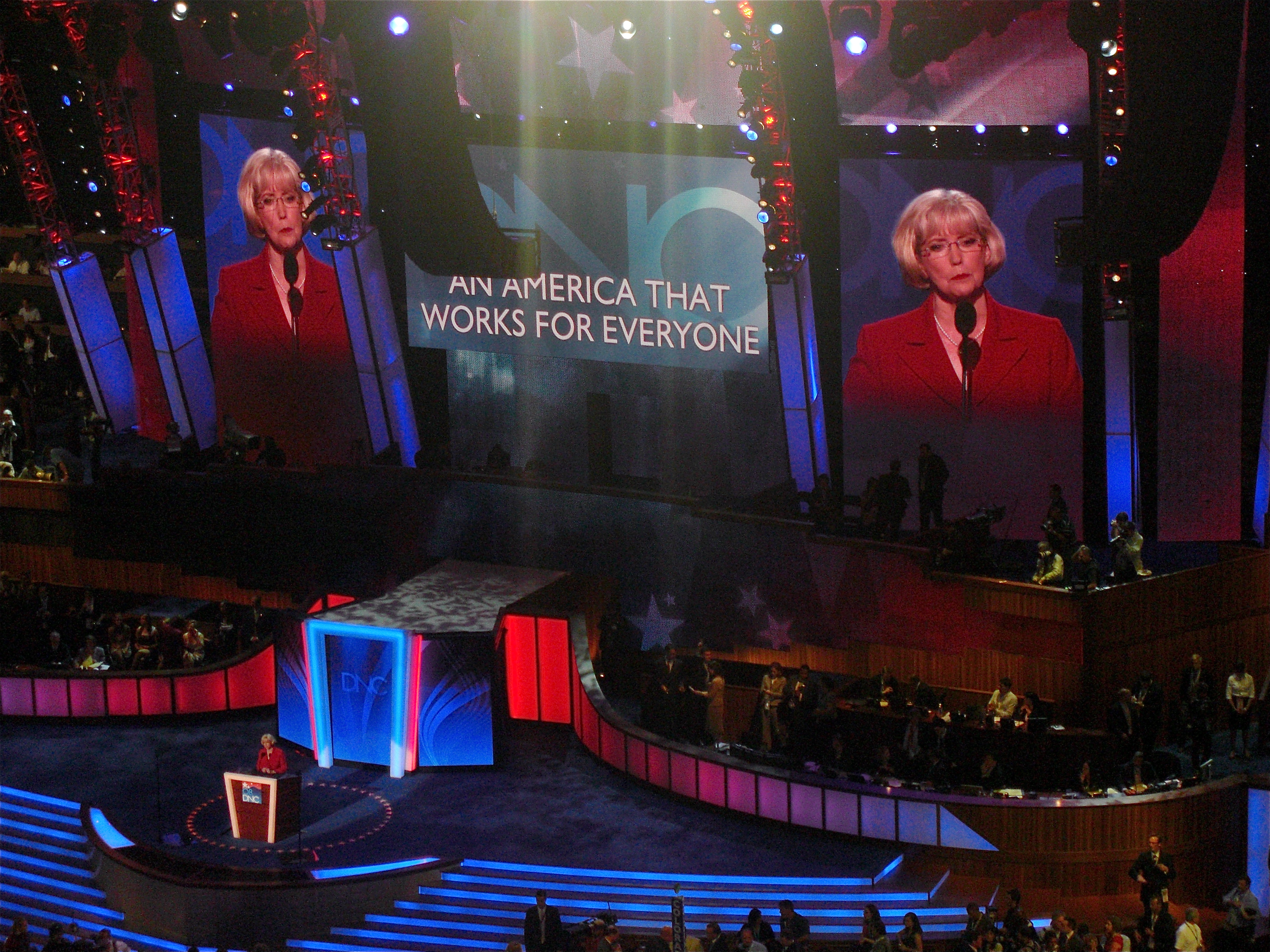
Ledbetter speaks during the second day of the 2008 Democratic National Convention in Denver, Colorado.

The House Democrats were fast to react, coming out on June 12 against the Supreme Court. Claiming lead from Justice Ruth Ginsburg's dissenting opinion, which invited the Congress to take action by amending the law, the Democrats announced their intention to intervene: House Majority Leader Steny Hoyer and Education and Labor Committee Chairman George Miller said that a bill was to be passed to avoid future court rulings in line with Ledbetter, clearly putting that "a key provision of the legislation will make it clear that discrimination occurs not just when the decision to discriminate is made, but also when someone becomes subject to that discriminatory decision, and when they are affected by that discriminatory decision, including each time they are issued a discriminatory paycheck", as said by Rep. Miller.

Republicans immediately opposed the bill as drafted, with Education and Labor Committee ranking member Howard McKeon raising the issue that business executives would be held liable for actions taken by managers who weren't leading the company anymore: "At the end of the day, such a loophole conceivably could allow a retiring employee to seek damages against a company now led by executives who had nothing to do with the initial act of discrimination".

The American Bar Association passed a resolution supporting the new bill. Neal Mollen, who represented the United States Chamber of Commerce in the Ledbetter case, argued that extending the term limit would put a strain on the chances of an adequate defense for the employers, as to defend themselves one "has to rely on documents and the memory of individuals, and neither of those is permanent. If a disappointed employee can wait for many years before raising a claim of discrimination ... he or she can wait out the employer, that is ensure that the employer effectively unable to offer any meaningful defense to the claim".

Organizations that supported the bill include the following:
American Civil Liberties Union, AFL–CIO, American Federation of Teachers, National Education Association, American Rights at Work, American Library Association, People For the American Way, Leadership Conference on Civil Rights, National Employment Lawyers Association, Hadassah, National Women's Law Center, National Network to End Domestic Violence, Center for Inquiry - Washington DC, American Association of University Women, Alliance for Justice, Legal Momentum, Bazelon Center for Mental Health Law, National Partnership for Women and Families, Coalition of Labor Union Women, Moms Rising, National Organization for Women, American Association of Retired Persons, Women's Voices, Women Vote Action Fund, 21st Century Democrats, 9to5, National Association of Working Women, Service Employees International Union, Religious Action Center of Reform Judaism, Women Employed, Women's League for Conservative Judaism, Union for Reform Judaism, National Council of Jewish Women, Rabbinical Assembly, Feminist Majority Foundation, YWCA USA, National Gay and Lesbian Task Force Action Fund, and National Council of La Raza.

Organizations that opposed the bill include the following:
U.S. Chamber of Commerce, Eagle Forum, Society for Human Resource Management, National Association of Manufacturers, American Bakers Association, College and University Professional Association for Human Resources, Associated Builders and Contractors, and American Hotel & Lodging Association.

== Legislative history ==
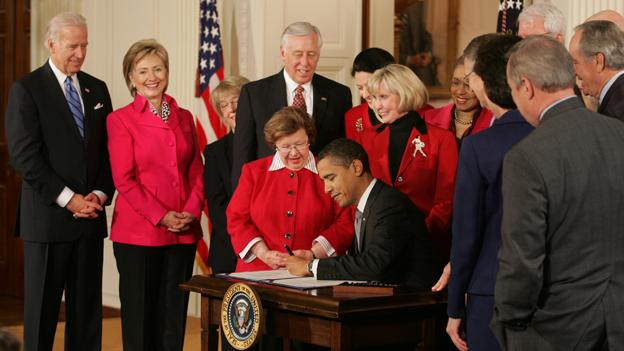
President Obama signing the Act into law; to his right is the new law's namesake, Lilly Ledbetter

The bill (H.R. 2831 and S. 1843) was defeated in April 2008 by Republicans in the Senate who cited the possibility of frivolous lawsuits in their opposition of the bill and criticized Democrats for refusing to allow compromises.

The bill was reintroduced in the 111th Congress (as H.R. 11 and S. 181) in January 2009. It passed in the House of Representatives with a vote of 250–177. The vote was split along party lines, with three Republicans voting in favor (Ed Whitfield, Leonard Lance, and Chris Smith) and five Democrats voting against (Travis Childers, Dan Boren, Allen Boyd, Parker Griffith, and Bobby Bright). The Senate voted 72–23 to invoke cloture on S. 181 on January 15, 2009. The Lilly Ledbetter Fair Pay Act passed the Senate, 61–36, on January 22, 2009. Those in favor included every Democratic senator (except Ted Kennedy, who was absent from the vote because of health issues), two independents who caucused with Democrats, and five Republican senators, including all four female Republicans in the senate: Susan Collins, Olympia Snowe, Kay Bailey Hutchison, and Lisa Murkowski. Senator Arlen Specter was at the time a Republican and also voted in favor of the bill. Shortly thereafter, Senator Spector switched parties, joining the Democratic caucus in April 2009.

President Obama actively supported the bill. The official White House blog said:

President Obama has long championed this bill and Lilly Ledbetter's cause, and by signing it into law, he will ensure that women like Ms. Ledbetter and other victims of pay discrimination can effectively challenge unequal pay.

House Majority Leader Steny Hoyer announced that the House would vote on S. 181 (the bill passed by the Senate) during the week of January 26, getting the bill to President Obama's desk sooner rather than later. On January 27, the House passed S. 181 by a 250–177 vote.

On January 29, 2009, nine days after he took office, Obama signed the bill into law. It was the first act he signed as president, and it fulfilled his campaign pledge to nullify Ledbetter v. Goodyear. However, by signing it only two days after it was passed by the House, he incurred criticism by newspapers, such as the St. Petersburg Times which mentioned his campaign promise to give the public five days of notice to comment on legislation before he signed it. The White House through a spokesman answered that they would be "implementing this policy in full soon", and that, currently they were "working through implementation procedures and some initial issues with the congressional calendar".

In 2017, the Trump administration announced it was ending an Obama-era rule that required businesses with over 100 employees to collect wage data by gender, race, and ethnicity.

== See also ==
- Equal Rights Amendment
