= Jacksonville City Schools =

School district in Alabama

Jacksonville City School District is a school district in Calhoun County, Alabama. It contains two schools: Jacksonville High School and Kitty Stone Elementary School.
