= Okfuskee =

Muscogee tribe

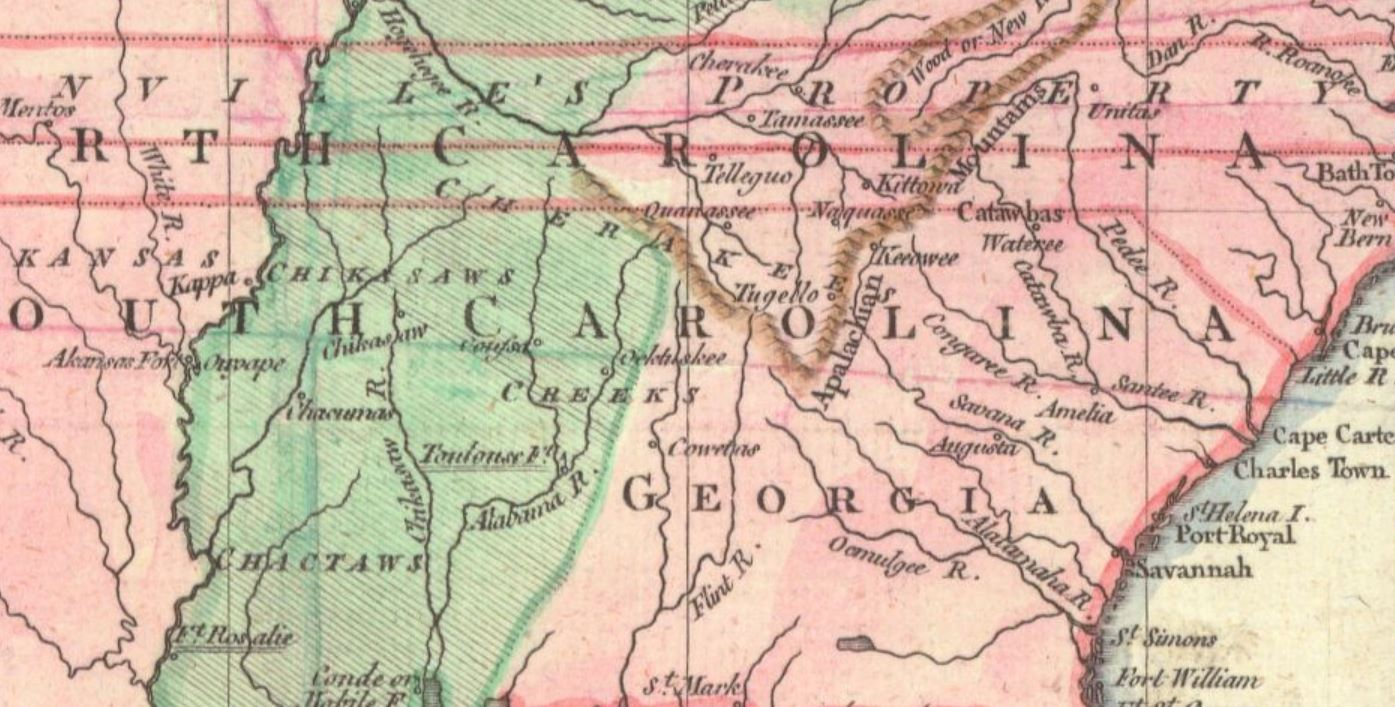
John Lodge 1754 map showing the location of Okfuskee (spelled Ockfuskee in center of image)

The Okfuskee (Creek: Akfvske) are a Muscogee tribe. Alternative spellings include the traditional Mvskoke spelling "Akfvske", referring to the tribal town in Alabama, and the comparable spelling Oakfuskee. They formed part of the former Creek (Muscogee) Confederacy in Alabama, prior to their removal during the 1830s to the Indian Territory. Okfuskee County, Oklahoma is named for a settlement where members of the tribe formerly lived.

The talwa was located on the Tallapoosa River, near Sandy Creek. The town occupied both sides of the Tallapoosa River and it lay at the intersection of two major trade routes, the Upper Trading Path that connected it to Charleston and the Okfuskee Trail that connected it to Savannah. The Upper Trading Path continued toward the west, connecting Okfuskee with the Chickasaw tribe. In response to the French construction of Fort Toulouse, British traders from the Province of Georgia occupied a fort in Okfuskee, known as Fort Okfuskee, from 1735 to 1743. Traders from the Province of South Carolina built a second Fort Okfuskee that was only occupied in 1744.

The Red Stick leader Menawa was from Okfuskee.
