= Harvey Jackson III =

American historian

- Born: February 25, 1943 (age 83); Junction City, Kansas, USA
- Occupation: Professor of History
- Years active: 1973–present
- Spouse: Marcia Flood (m. 1966; div. 1987) Suzanne Brown (m. 1988)
- Children: 3

Academic background
- Education: Birmingham–Southern College, B.A. (1965); University of Alabama, M.A. (1966); University of Georgia, Ph.D. (1973)
- Thesis: Lachlan McIntosh and the Politics of Revolutionary Georgia

Academic work
- Discipline: History
- Sub-discipline: Southern American history
- Institutions: Clayton Junior College

Harvey Hardaway Jackson III (born February 25, 1943) is the Professor of History at Jacksonville State University in Alabama. He is the author of a number of works on Alabama and Georgia history.

== Early life and career ==
He was born in Junction City, Kansas, in February 1943. His father Harvey H. Jackson Jr. was a teacher, businessman, and politician while his mother Elizabeth W. Jackson worked for the US Department of Agriculture. Jackson studied for his B.A. at Birmingham-Southern College in 1965. He obtained an M.A. from the University of Alabama in 1966 before marrying Marcia Flood in 1966. They divorced in 1987. He married Suzanne Brown in 1988. He has three children: Kelly Leigh Jackson (b. 1968), William Blackwell Jackson (b. 1993) and Anna Elizabeth Jackson (b. 1998).

Jackson taught at South Florida Junior College in Avon Park, Florida, between 1966 and 1970 before studying for a doctorate at the University of Georgia completing it in 1973. While studying for his doctorate, Jackson developed a particular interest in the 18th century.

== Published Historian ==
Dr Jackson started work as an Assistant Professor of History at Clayton Junior College in Morrow, Georgia, in 1973. He was promoted to Associate Professor in 1977. Jackson published his first book on Lachlan McIntosh and Revolutionary Georgia in 1979.

He wrote a second book on Georgians who signed the Declaration of Independence with co-authors Harvey Young, Edwin Bridges and Kenneth Thomas, published in 1981. Jackson became Professor of History and Chairman of Social Sciences in 1982.

Jackson worked with Phinizy Spaulding on editing a collection of essays on colonial Georgia published in 1984 and on writing a biography of General James Oglethorpe in 1989.

He published two works on the history of Alabama rivers in the 1990s. In 1990 he became Professor and head of the Department of History and Foreign Languages at Jacksonville State University. In 2003, he published a history of Alabama that he had been working on for five years. In 2008 he became Eminent Scholar in History at Jacksonville State University.

== Written works ==
- Lachlan McIntosh and the Politics of Revolutionary Georgia University of Georgia Press 1979
- (With Harvey Young, Edwin Bridges and Kenneth Thomas) Georgia Signers and the Declaration of Independence Cherokee Press 1981
- (Editor with Phinizy Spaulding) Forty Years of Diversity: Essays on Colonial Georgia University of Georgia Press 1984
- (Editor with Phinizy Spaulding) Oglethorpe in Perspective: Georgia's Founder After Two Hundred Years University of Alabama Press 1989
- Rivers of History: Life on the Coosa, Tallapoosa, Cahaba and Alabama University of Alabama Press 1995
- Putting "Loafing Streams" to Work: The Building of Lay, Mitchell, Martin and Jordan Dams 1910-1929 University of Alabama Press 1997
- Inside Alabama: A Personal History of My State University of Alabama Press/Fire Ant Books 2003
- The Rise and Decline of the Redneck Riviera: An Insider's History of the Florida-Alabama Coast University of Georgia Press 2012
