= Ledbetter v. Goodyear Tire & Rubber Co. =

Ledbetter v. Goodyear Tire & Rubber Co
- Supreme Court of the United States

Argued November 27, 2006 Decided May 29, 2007
- Full case name: Ledbetter v. Goodyear Tire & Rubber Co., Inc.
- Docket no.: 05-1074
- Citations: 550 U.S. 618 (more) 127 S. Ct. 2162; 167 L. Ed. 2d 982; 2007 U.S. LEXIS 6295; 75 U.S.L.W. 4359

Case history
- Prior: Judgment for Plaintiff, (N.D. Ala.); rev'd, 421 F.3d 1169 (11th Cir. 2005), cert granted, 548 U.S. 903 (2006).

Holding
- The equal pay for equal work discrimination charging period is triggered when a discrete unlawful practice takes place. A new violation does not occur, and a new charging period does not commence, upon the occurrence of subsequent non-discriminatory acts that entail adverse effects resulting from the past discrimination.

Court membership
- Chief Justice John Roberts Associate Justices John P. Stevens · Antonin Scalia; Anthony Kennedy · David Souter; Clarence Thomas · Ruth Bader Ginsburg; Stephen Breyer · Samuel Alito

Case opinions
- Majority: Alito, joined by Roberts, Scalia, Kennedy, Thomas
- Dissent: Ginsburg, joined by Stevens, Souter, Breyer

Laws applied
- Title VII of the Civil Rights Act of 1964; Equal Pay Act of 1963
- Superseded by
- Lilly Ledbetter Fair Pay Act of 2009

Ledbetter v. Goodyear Tire & Rubber Co., 550 U.S. 618 (2007), is an employment discrimination decision of the Supreme Court of the United States. The result was that employers could not be sued under Title VII of the Civil Rights Act of 1964 over race or gender pay discrimination if the claims were based on decisions made by the employer 180 days or more before the claim. Justice Alito held for the five-justice majority that each paycheck received did not constitute a discrete discriminatory act, even if it was affected by a prior decision outside the time limit. Ledbetter's claim of the "paycheck accrual rule" was rejected. The decision did not prevent plaintiffs from suing under other laws, like the Equal Pay Act, which has a three-year deadline for most sex discrimination claims, or 42 U.S.C. 1981, which has a four-year deadline for suing over race discrimination.

This was a case of statutory rather than constitutional interpretation, explaining the meaning of a law, not deciding its constitutionality. The plaintiff in this case, Lilly Ledbetter, characterized her situation as one where "disparate pay is received during the statutory limitations period, but is the result of intentionally discriminatory pay decisions that occurred outside the limitations period." In rejecting Ledbetter's appeal, the Supreme Court said that "she could have, and should have, sued" when the pay decisions were made, instead of waiting beyond the 180-day statutory charging period. The Court did leave open the possibility that a plaintiff could sue beyond the 180-day period if she did not, and could not, have discovered the discrimination earlier. The effect of the Court's holding was reversed by the passage of the Lilly Ledbetter Fair Pay Act in 2009.

== Background of the case ==
In 1979 Lilly Ledbetter, the plaintiff, began work at the Goodyear Tire and Rubber Company in its Gadsden, Alabama location, a union plant. She started with the same pay as male employees, but by retirement, she was earning $3,727 per month compared to 15 men who earned from $4,286 per month (lowest paid man) to $5,236 per month (highest paid man). During her years at the factory as a salaried worker, raises were given and denied based partly on evaluations and recommendations regarding worker performance. From 1979 to 1981, Ledbetter received a series of negative evaluations, which she later claimed were discriminatory. Although her subsequent evaluations were good, in part because of those early negative evaluations, her pay never reached the level of similar male employees. All merit increases had to be substantiated by a formal evaluation. In March 1998, Ledbetter inquired into the possible sexual discrimination by the Goodyear Tire Company. In July, she filed formal charges with the Equal Employment Opportunity Commission. In November 1998, after early retirement, Ledbetter sued, claiming pay discrimination under Title VII of the Civil Rights Act of 1964 and the Equal Pay Act of 1963. The Supreme Court did not rule on whether discrimination had occurred, just on whether the statute of limitations had expired.

=== Statutory provisions at issue ===
- "It shall be an unlawful employment practice for an employer… --to discriminate against any individual with respect to his compensation, terms, conditions, or privileges of employment, because of such individual’s race, color, religion, sex, or national origin...."
- "A charge under this section shall be filed within one hundred and eighty days after the alleged unlawful employment practice occurred."
- "it shall not be an unlawful employment practice for an employer to apply different standards of compensation...provided that such differences are not the result of an intention to discriminate because of race, color, religion, sex, or national origin."

=== Lower court proceedings ===
The District Court found in favor of Goodyear on the Equal Pay Act claim, because that Act allows pay differences that are based on merit. The court allowed the Title VII and other claims to proceed to trial. Ledbetter claimed that she had been evaluated unfairly because of her sex and therefore had been paid significantly less than her male colleagues. Goodyear claimed that their evaluations were non-discriminatory and focused only on worker competence. The jury found for Ledbetter and awarded back pay and damages. Goodyear appealed, arguing that all claims for damages before September 26, 1997, were void due to the statute of limitations on discrimination claims.

The United States Court of Appeals for the Eleventh Circuit reversed the lower court's decision, stating that Ledbetter could sue only for allegations regarding pay decisions that occurred less than 180 days before her beginning the EEOC process in March 1998. Ledbetter, as the court ruled, could not sue on decisions that merely affected pay in the 180-day period. Furthermore, all decisions made concerning pay in the 180-day period could not be unequivocally linked to her gender. Ledbetter sought a writ of certiorari, but did not contest the sufficiency of the evidence concerning decisions in the 180-day period. The Supreme Court granted the writ and heard the appeal.

=== Supreme Court precedent ===
In United Airlines v. Evans, Justice Stevens wrote for the Court: "A discriminatory act which is not made the basis for a timely charge ... is merely an unfortunate event in history which has no present legal consequences." The Court in Ledbetter said that "it would be difficult to speak to the point more directly."

== The Supreme Court's decision ==
Oral arguments
Recording of oral arguments before the Supreme Court

Opinion announcement
Justice Alito reads the opinion of the court.

Justice Alito delivered the opinion of the court. The Court held that according to Title VII, discriminatory intent must occur during the 180-day charging period. Ledbetter did not claim that Goodyear acted with discriminatory intent in the charging period by issuing the checks, nor by denying her a raise in 1998. She argued that the discriminatory behavior occurred long before but still affected her during the 180-day charging period. Prior caselaw, the Court held, established that the actual intentional discrimination must occur within the charging period. The Court also stated that according to those prior cases, Ledbetter's claim that each check is an act of discrimination is inconsistent with the statute, because there was no evidence of discriminatory intent in the issuing of the checks. Alito was joined in his opinion by Justices Antonin Scalia, Anthony M. Kennedy, Clarence Thomas, and Chief Justice John G. Roberts Jr.

=== Ginsburg's dissent ===
Dissent
Justice Ginsburg reads her dissent from the bench

Justice Ginsburg wrote the dissent and read it from the bench, an infrequent practice. Joined by Justices Stevens, Souter, and Breyer, she argued against applying the 180-day limit to pay discrimination, because discrimination often occurs in small increments over time. Furthermore, the pay information of fellow workers is typically confidential and unavailable for comparison. Ginsburg argued that pay discrimination is inherently different from adverse actions, such as termination. Adverse actions are obvious, but small pay discrepancies are often difficult to recognize except over time. Ginsburg argued that the broad remedial purpose of the statute was incompatible with the Court's "cramped" interpretation. Her dissent asserted that the employer had been "[k]nowingly carrying past pay discrimination forward" during the 180-day charging period and therefore could be held liable.

== Reaction and subsequent legislation ==
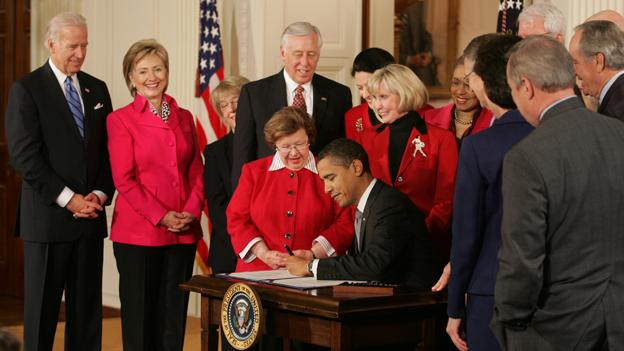
President Obama signs the Lilly Ledbetter Fair Pay Act into law on January 29, 2009; to his right is the new law's namesake, Lilly Ledbetter.

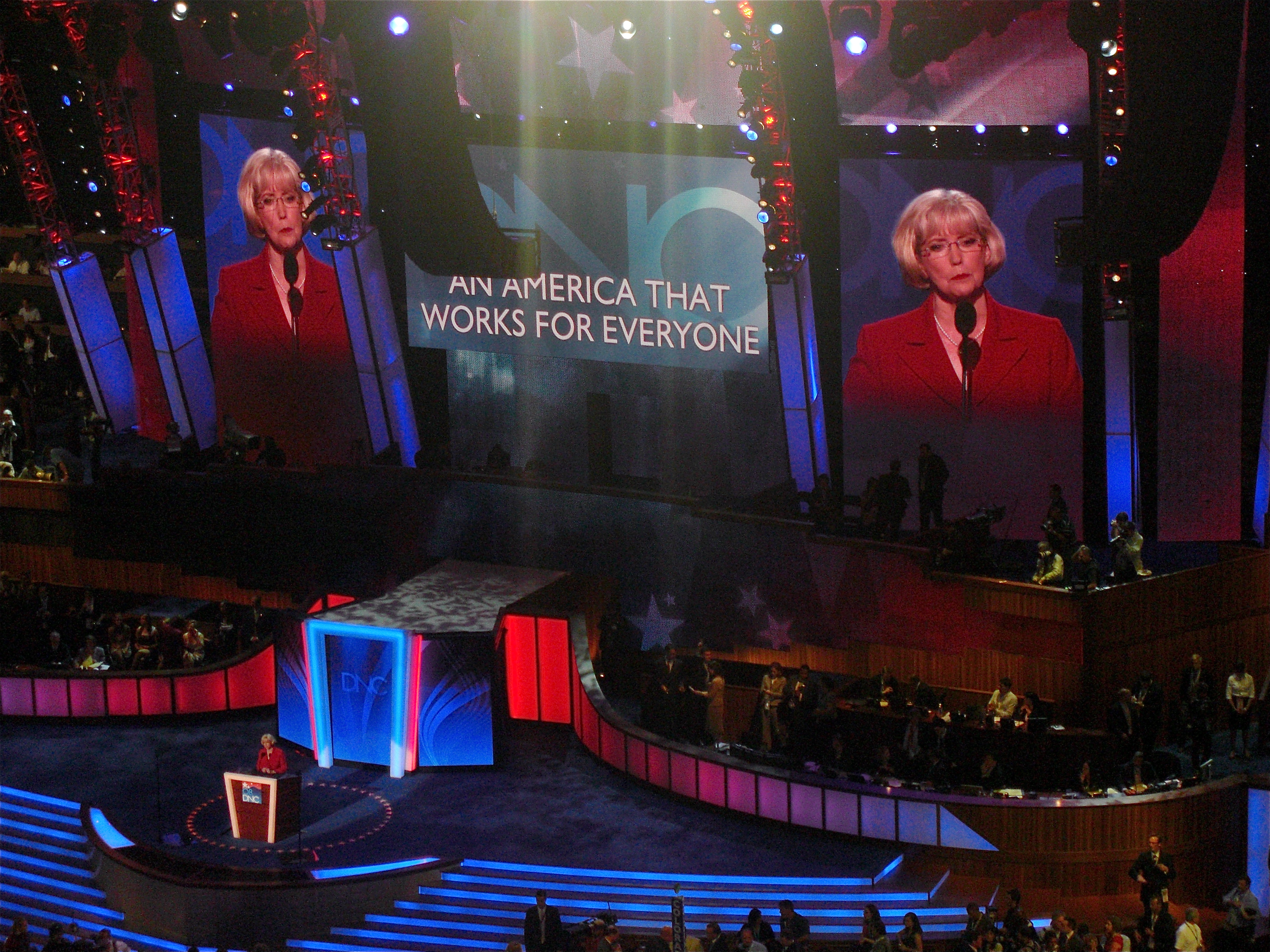
Ledbetter speaks during the second day of the 2008 Democratic National Convention in Denver, Colorado.

In 2007, several Democratic members of Congress introduced the Lilly Ledbetter Fair Pay Act, which revised the law to state that if a present act of discrimination pertains, prior acts outside of the 180-day statute of limitations for pay discrimination can be incorporated into the claim.

The bill was an issue in the 2008 Presidential election campaign, with Barack Obama supporting the bill, and John McCain opposed to it. The plaintiff in the case, Lilly Ledbetter, appeared in campaign ads for the Obama campaign and had a speaking role at the Democratic National Convention.

In January 2009, Congress passed and President Obama signed the Lilly Ledbetter Fair Pay Act into law.

== Notes and references ==
The citations in this article are written in Bluebook style. Please see the talk page for more information.
