= Desert of Ocute =

The Desert of Ocute
- The Wilderness of Ocute
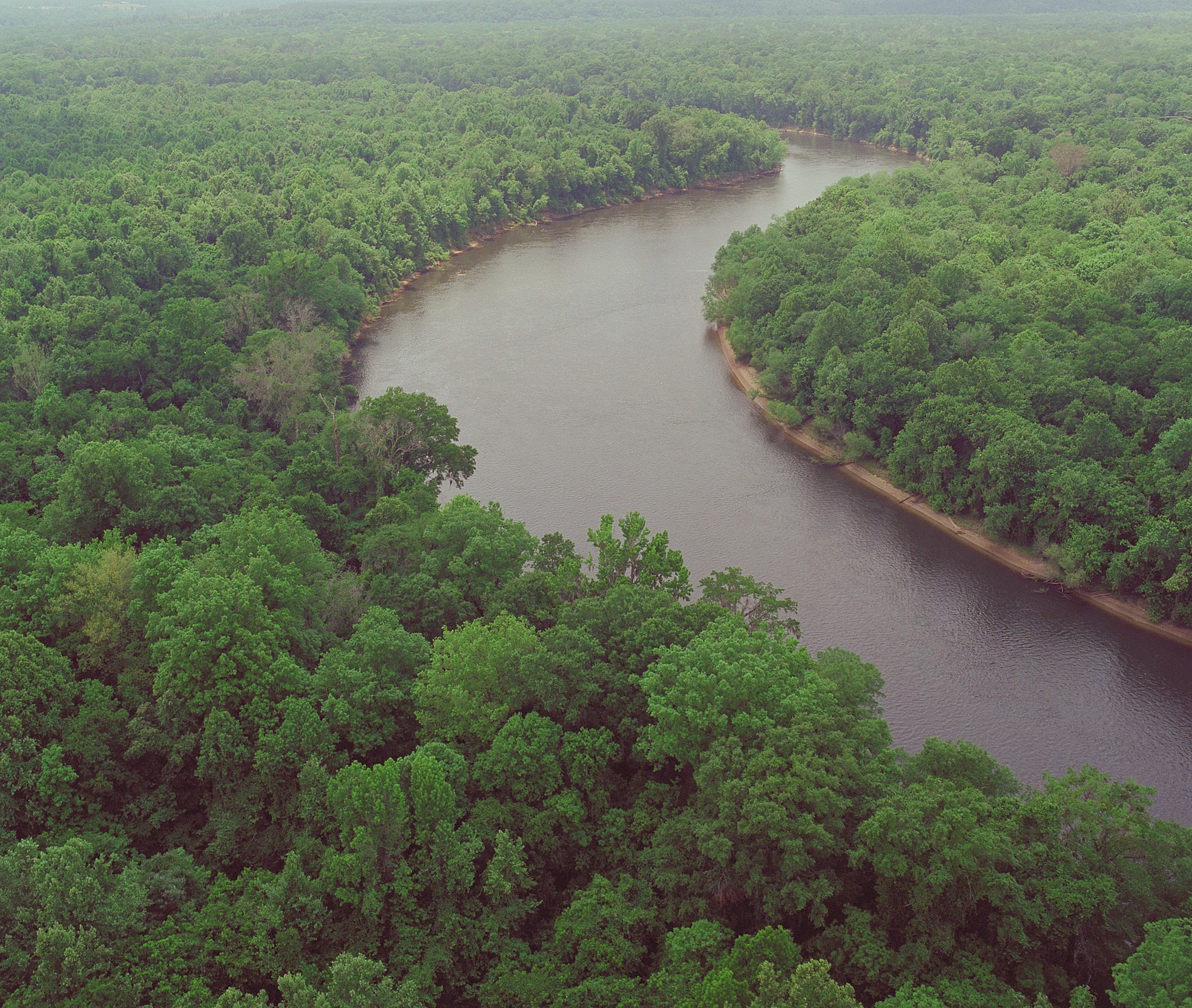
- Nature shots taken at the Savannah River Site, Aiken, SC

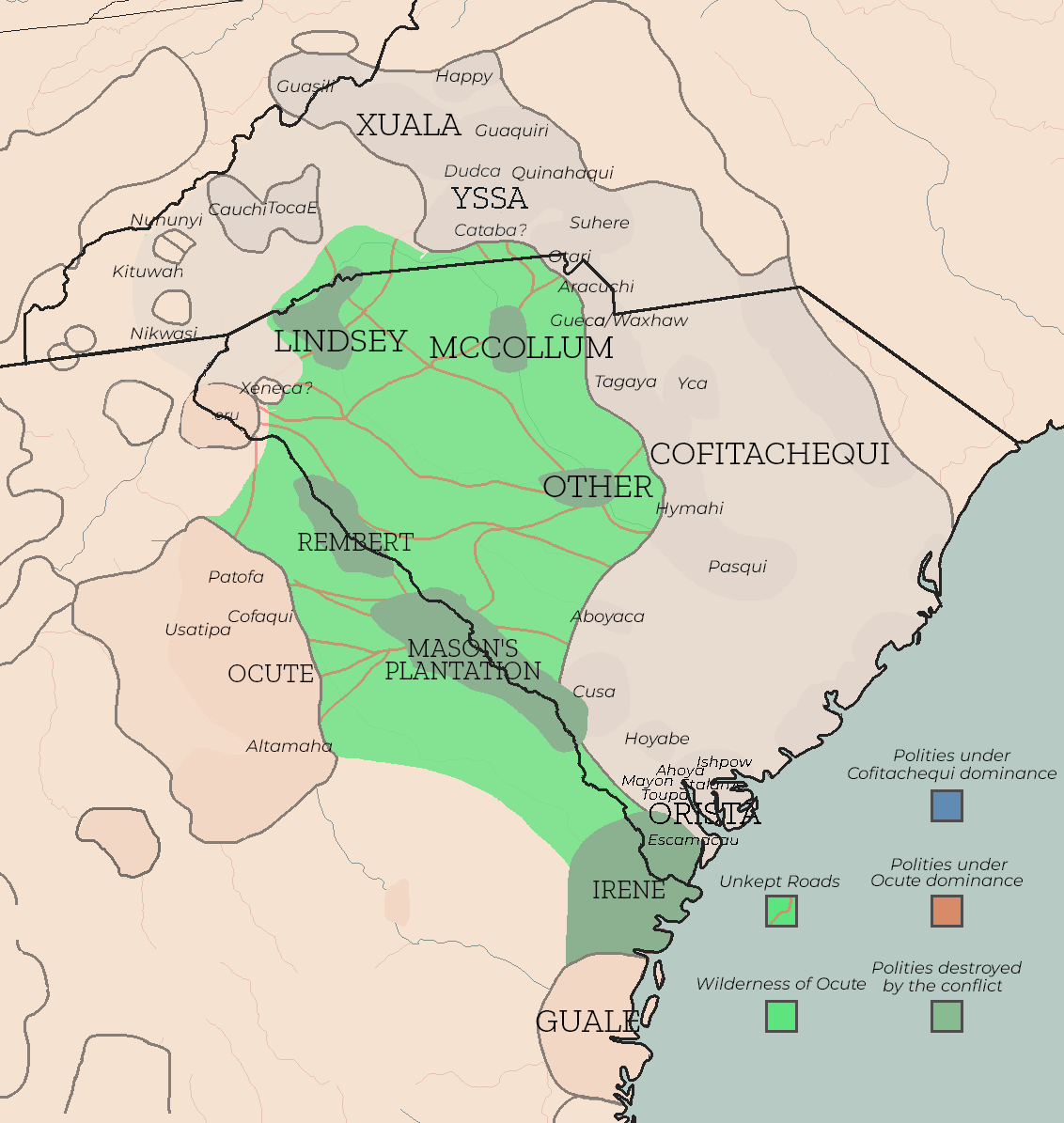
- Length: 400 km (250 mi)
- Width: 200 km (120 mi)
- Area: 56,000 km^{2} (22,000 mi^{2})

Geography
- Country: United States
- States/Provinces: South Carolina; Georgia; North Carolina

The Desert of Ocute or Wilderness of Ocute was a vast uninhabited area encompassing the Savannah River, as well as the Broad and Saluda River basins. The Desert covered some 56,000 km^{2} (22,000 sq mi), including parts of North Carolina, South Carolina and Georgia. The region was formed between 1370 and 1450 by a series of depopulations due to warfare between the chiefdoms in the Desert (Like McCollum and Mason's Plantation), and those around, notably Cofitachequi and Ocute.

== History ==
=== Fall of the McCollum Chiefdom (c. 1375) ===
Around 1375, a Broad River chiefdom, centered on the McCollum Mound, collapsed. Likely caused by a combination of drought, and warfare with Cofitachequi, the end of Cofitachequi's longtime regional competitor signaled the start of Cofitachequi's rise to power regionally. A large influx of people from the now-abandoned Broad River Chiefdom likely boosted Cofitachequi's population and capacity, enabling a larger workforce to create more earthen monuments like those at Canosi (Mulberry) and Talimeco (Adamson). When De Soto went through the area in 1540, he encountered a few abandoned hunting camps, and roads leading to the McCollum and Blair Mounds, though the towns were reported to be abandoned. The "Other" Mound Site, dated to the Mississippian period, may've also been part of this period of abandonment.

=== Fall of the Lindsey Chiefdom (<1450) ===
Another Broad River chiefdom was centered at the headwaters, near modern-day Greenville on the Lindsey mound. Unlike the McCollum Chiefdom, the Lindsey Chiefdom was of the Pisgah culture, ancestral to the modern Cherokee. The chiefdom located the Lindsey mound and its related Pisgah sites in the region may have moved to Cauchi (The Garden Creek site) and TocaE (possibly at the Swannanoa site) which was established around the time Lindsey was abandoned and had similar material culture. These two chiefdoms went on to be affiliated with Xuala/Joara and Cofitachequi.

=== Fall of the Middle Savannah River Chiefdom (c. 1375–1390) ===
Drought, as well as warfare involving Ocute and Cofitachequi, greatly affected the Mississippian 'complex-chiefdom' (a polity with more than two tiers of administration) centered on Mason's Plantation near modern-day Augusta along the Savannah River, possibly the largest site along the river Savannah. During the 1370s and 1380s, the polity began to abandon their major monumental capitals. such as Red Lake (abandoned around 1380), Mason Plantation mounds (abandoned around 1385), Hollywood (abandoned around 1386) and Spring Lake (abandoned around 1389). Although a small population at the 38AK757 site may've stayed on after the major abandonment period until at least 1400, the Middle Savannah River was, for all intents and purposes, abandoned. The once abandoned Cofaqui, the oldest Mississippian mound site within Ocute, was resettled in 1400 shortly after the abandonment of the Middle Savannah River, possibly founded by taking these refugees. The largest contigent however, fled to coastal groups, forming the bulk of the emerging Irene Phase chiefdom centered on the Irene Mound in Savannah, Georgia. The Irene phase Chiefdom, possibly related to the Timucuan exonym Ybaha/Yupaha for the Coastal southeast groups, was likely organized into three main provinces or site clusters. Along with the core Irene province at the mouth of the Savannah, there were the antecedents of the Guale, possibly centered on the Kenan Field site, and the antecedents of the Orista, centered on the Indian Hill site on St. Helena's Island.

=== Fall of the Rembert Chiefdom (c. 1375–1450) ===
North of the Middle Savannah Chiefdom was a chiefdom centered at the Rembert site, possibly the largest in the entire Savannah River with its largest mound standing at 10 meters, around the same as Cofitachequi's Talimeco. Its dissolution compared to the Middle Savannah River was long and slow. After the 1370s-1380s era of conflict with neighboring polities, though not necessarily Cofitachequi, the first wave of people that left in 1400 went north to form Joara (Burke phase chiefdom) and possibly the Quinahaqui (Low phase) polities. After 1400, political consolidation and military fortifications (like palisades and moats) began to increase in towns subordinate to Rembert, and another wave of people would leave before 1450 to found Tacoru (Tugalo phase chiefdom) and the site was finally abandoned. Considering Rembert's longevity compared to the Middle Savannah Chiefdom, it's possible that Rembert played a role in its demise in collaboration with Cofitachequi. Rembert's principal descendants, Tacoru, Quinahaqui and Joara, went on to become players in the politics between Ocute and Cofitachequi, with Joara and Quinahaqui joining the Cofitachequi regional order while Tacoru likely joined Ocute's.

=== Fall of the Irene phase Chiefdom (c. 1390–1450) ===
After accepting refugees from the Middle Savannah Chiefdom, it seemed like the Irene phase Chiefdom was the next target of Cofitachequi aggression. After 1375, a buffer zone was created on the South Carolina Coast between the Irene phase Orista and the likely Cofitachequi-allied groups on Winyah Bay. The tense situation was heightened after the late 14th century with the Irene acceptance of the remaining Middle Savannah population. Conflict between 1400 and 1450 would spell the end of the Irene phase Chiefdom, possibly involving a switch in allegiance of the Orista on Saint Helena's Island, who were still in a fairly prestigious position in the region by Spanish contact compared to the fate of Irene itself, which was abandoned and the entire area around it abandoned. The remnant of Irene, the Guale Micoship, seems to have aligned itself with Ocute against Cofitachequi, the two later forming the Yamasee Confederation.
