= Cofitachequi =

Precontact 'chiefdom' in North America

Province of Cofitachequi Possibly also known as Duahe
- c. 1200 – c. 1680
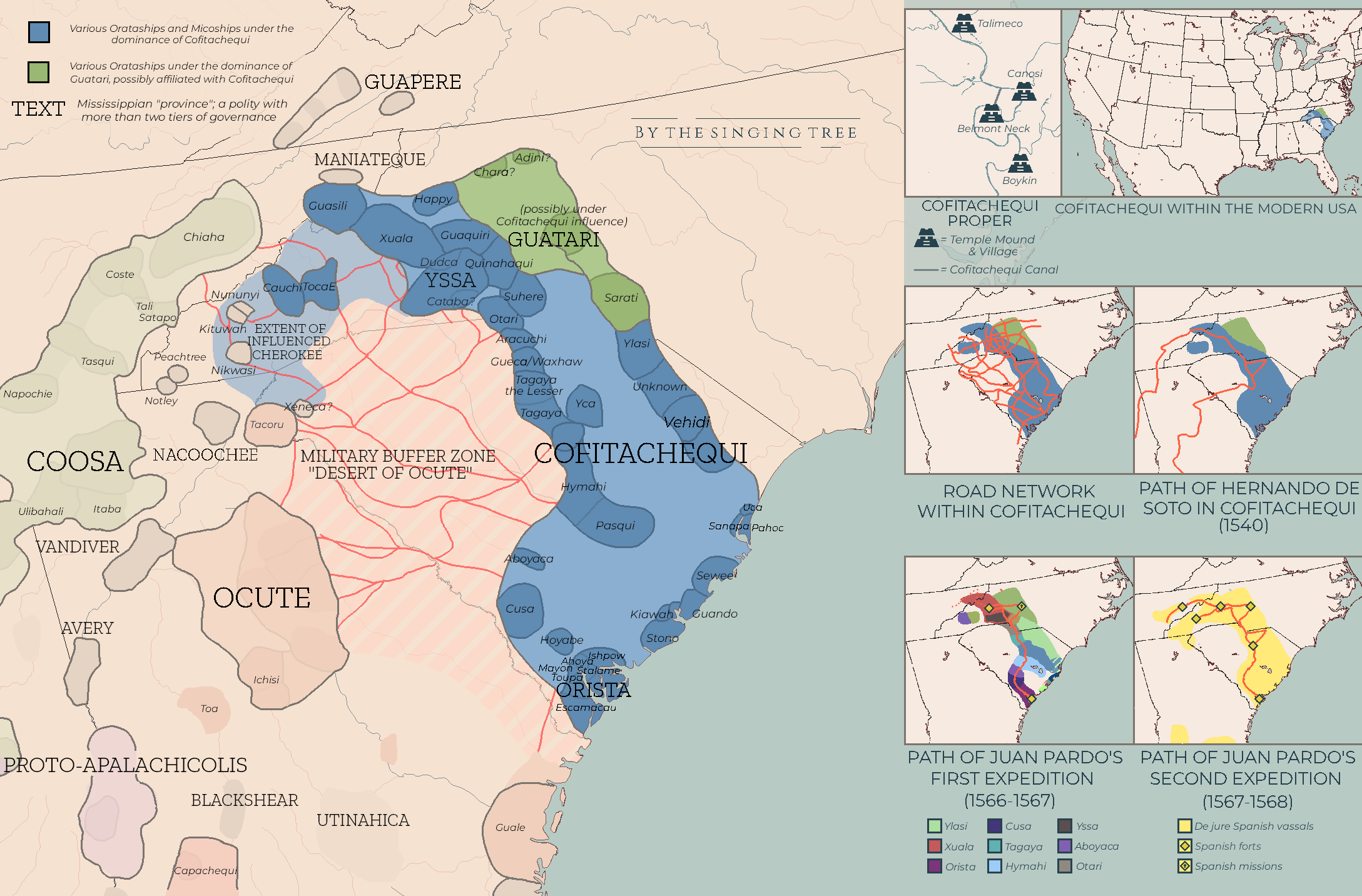
- A map of Cofitachequi in 1540 with accompanying maps of Cofitachequi during the Juan Pardo Expeditions
- Status: Mississippian-culture micoship
- Location: Wateree River
- Capital: Belmont Neck (c. 1200–1300); Talimeco (c. 1300–1450); Canosi (c. 1450–1680)
- Common languages: Muskogean; Catawba; Cherokee
- Government: Monarchy
- Mico
- Historical era: Late Mississippian period
  - Start of Belmont Neck phase: c. 1200
  - Talimeco designated as capital: c. 1225 – c. 1250
  - Wars with polities on the Pee Dee and Savannah rivers: c. 1375 – c. 1450
  - Cofitachequi-Ocuti War: c. 1450 – c. 1680
  - Cofitachequi Epidemic: 1520s
  - De Soto arrives in Cofitachequi: 1540
  - Westo and Occaneechi Raids: c. 17th century
  - Visit from Charleston: 1670

Area
  - 1540: 75,000 km^{2} (29,000 sq mi)
Succeeded by
Creek Confederacy
Catawba Confederacy
Joara
Guatari
- Today part of: South Carolina; North Carolina

Cofitachequi, was a Mississippian 'paramount chiefdom' in the U.S. state of South Carolina, encountered by Europeans in the 16th and 17th centuries. Centered in the Wateree River valley, the Mico (or "emperor") of Cofitachequi held sway over the immediate neighbors on the Wateree and Broad Rivers, and at its peak in the 1500s extended influence into the North Carolina piedmont and the Pee Dee River.

While it was always based in the Wateree River valley around Camden, South Carolina, the capital district of Cofitachequi shifted over the years, likely beginning at the Belmont Neck, one of the earliest Mississippian temple mounds in South Carolina just a mile southwest of Canosi (the 16th century capital of Cofitachequi).

By 1300, Belmont Neck had been completely abandoned and the capital shifted to Talimeco (the Adamson site). At Talimeco, Cofitachequi rose to be a middling regional power, and by 1400 competing with contemporaries like Sarati and Guatari (descendants of the Town Creek Mound), and most importantly Ocute. Scholars have speculated the Ocute's anti-Cofitachequi alliance stretched as far as regions like Guale Mayor-Micoship (another Savannah River refugee destination) on the Georgia Coast, Tugaloo (last of the Savannah River chiefdoms), and Ichisi (on the Ocmulgee River). The wars between Ocute and her allies against Cofitachequi virtually emptied out the Savannah, Saluda and Broad River basins, creating a buffer zone known as the Despoblado of Ocute (translated variously as wilderness or desert).

When the Spanish made first contact on the coast in the 1520s they heard news of large kingdoms with pearls and a mighty king who dominated the coast; this was Cofitachequi. By the time of the De Soto Expedition in 1540, Ocute was fairly regularly organizing defences against Cofitachequi raids. After being provided with a couple thousand laborors by the Mico of Ocute, De Soto collaborated with Lord Patofa, whose territory lay on the northern edge of the Oconee River, to attack Cofitachequi.

De Soto's rampage in Cofitachequi spelled the start of the end of Cofitachequi's paramount rule. When Spanish conquistador Juan Pardo came in 1566, Cofitachequi was much diminished, usurped by its subordinates of Orista on the coast, Joara in the Northwest, Guatari in the Northeast and Ylasi in the East in regional power, happy to make friends with the Spaniards. After just 2 years of fort building and alliance making with the Spanish however, the Spanish forts were all destroyed in one fell swoop, likely due to misconduct by Spanish officers and poor organization.

Slave raids by northern alliances like the Iroquoian Westos, Yuchi, and Occaneechi decimated the region in the 17th century, though a short English expedition still noted that Cofitachequi held some level of regional power to the coast, possibly from the power vacuum caused by the Spanish after their departure. After 1670 Cofitachequi wasn't mentioned again, and its descendants likely fled to the emerging Catawba Confederacy, created out of Cofitachequi's former subjects in the north.

== Nomenclature ==
The polity of Cofitachequi may have been first recorded under the name of Duahe by Spanish conquistador Francisco de Ayllon. Despite attempted connections of this name to the Iroquoian Tuscarora, it is generally considered that Datha and Duahe were related to Cofitachequi, possibly coming from the Cusabo deity "Toya." Cofitachequi may have its origin in Muskogean languages, like the Hitchiti word for "dwelling"; ciki; the word for "to dig out"; ita; the Hitchiti word for "dogwood"; cofi, or "dogwood thicket"; cofita.

== History ==
=== Emergence and Belmont Neck phase (900-1300) ===
Mississippians, thought to be a religious as well as a cultural movement composing of hierarchical-theocratic governance and a Corn Mother religious movement, took root in the Wateree Valley around 1000. Capital of a Belmont Neck phase polity, Belmont Neck is thought to have been the earliest Mississippian mound site in the Camden region. With it being just over a mile southwest of the Mulberry Mounds (1500s era Cofitachequi), as well as the unbroken line of mound centers in the region since Belmont Neck, it's likely Belmont Neck was the first capital of Cofitachequi.

Although occupation began in the 10th century, the site was mainly occupied after 1200, signaling the start of the regional Belmont Neck phase. It likely had some sort of relationship to neighboring chiefdoms/micoships such as the Blair Mound in the Sumter National Forest, around 80 miles to the east, based on the similarity of material culture and the primacy of Belmont Neck.

Now inundated under Lake Murray, the mound site "Other" in the Broad River region could've played a role in Belmont Neck's rise. In 1225, a chiefdom centered on the Blair Mound site emerged, around 40 kilometers north of "Other." Blair Mound may've been a successor of the "Other" site as the Broad River Chiefdom seems to have moved 40 kilometers north again in 1300, almost exactly the same distance. There are a few possibilities on how this relates to Belmont Neck, which rose to prominence around the time Blair was established. Perhaps the rise in population around 1200 represents Belmont Neck accepting migrants and mound-building elites from the Broad River Chiefdom, unhappy with the move north to Blair. Perhaps the movement of the Broad River Chiefdom north could've gave Cofitachequi the space needed to build their own influence. As the "Other" site is currently underwater, we may never know for sure, but the closeness of material culture between the Broad River Chiefdom at Blair and Cofitachequi Chiefdom at Belmont Neck certainly points to at least some sort of close relationship.

=== Adamson phase and the Adamson Site (1300–1450) ===
From 1225 onward the Cofitachequi polity began to shift its monument-construction and population away from the Belmont Neck site to the Adamson Mounds site, identified as the town of Talimeco, meaning capital town. The largest mound at Talimeco boasted the largest mound in Cofitachequi. Atop this mound was a large temple on which the revered dead of Cofitachequi was kept, as well as wealth such as pearls and deerskin, and weapons.

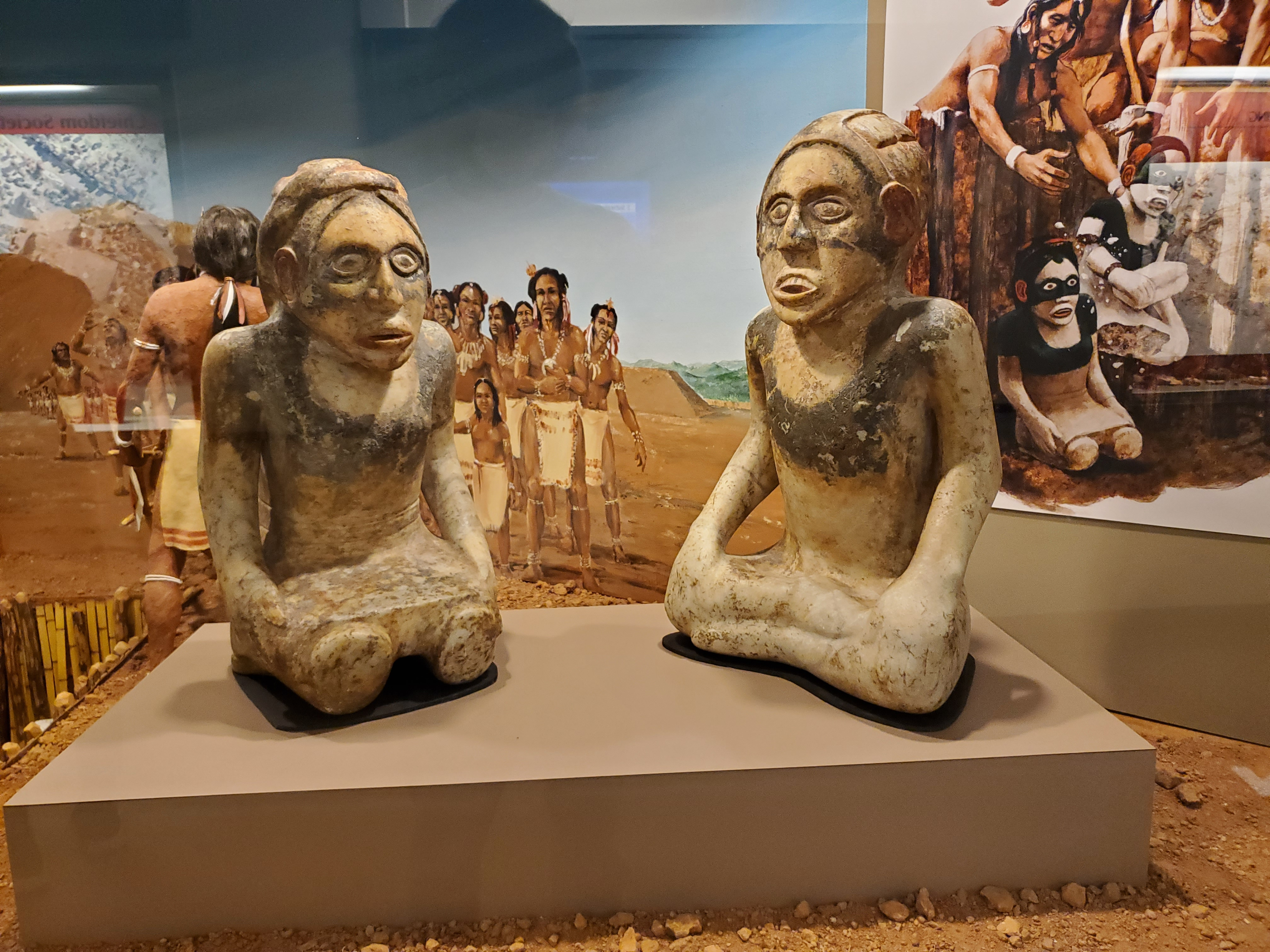
Mississippian statues that likely resembled those on Talimeco

The splendor of Talimeco during this period is clear from the descriptions given centuries later by the Spanish. Garcilaso the Incan describes the temple in the most detail, though certainly with some exaggeration as his account is based on multiple eye-witnesses years later. He describes twelve life-like statues "like giants" guarding the door, copper and pearl bands on their arms, wielding wooden clubs, wooden broadswords, a flint axe, longbows (in ready position) and a copper pike. More rows of life-size statues stood at the back of the temple, of both genders, and doors there led to a treasury room, where statues of men, women and children equipped with shields stood towering above the chests and equipment. There were 8 more rooms, each holding a different class of weapons; pikes, clubs, axes, broadswords, staffs, bows/arrows. round shields and oblong shields. Though many aspects are exaggerated, it is worth noting that Rangel and Biedma, two other chronicles of more official and reliable status, do agree in areas like the abundance of pearls, the rooms and the types of weapons.

=== Rise of Cofitachequi (1350–1500) ===
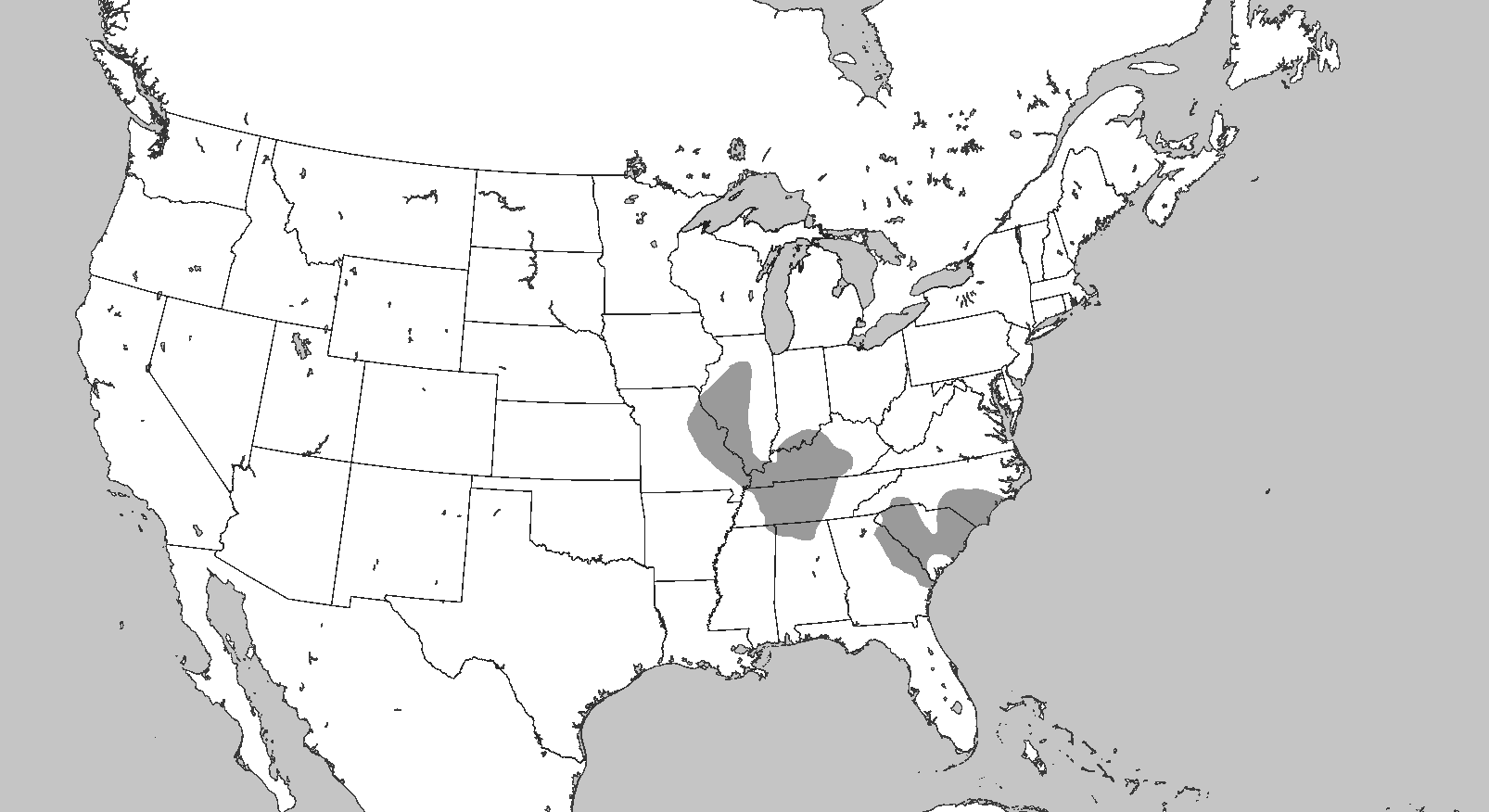
Map of the Mississippian quarters heavily affected by drought in the 15th and 16th centuries.

Cofitachequi's rapid century-long rise to become one of the largest and most powerful polities in America is closely linked to the era of crisis and instability across the Mississippian World in the 14th-16th centuries. A megadrought caused a major decrease of population in many regions in the Mississippian world, known as "Vacant Quarters." Cofitachequi and its leaders were able to weather the storm and in fact took advantage of the drought politically, promising stability and power to polities willing to center themselves on Cofitachequi, and war for those unwilling. The material culture of Cofitachequi during this time was a variant of the Lamar culture spread across Georgia, Tennessee, and South Carolina that was broadly comparable to that of the people of Ocute in Georgia.

==== Absorption of the Broad River chiefdom (c. 1375) ====
Around 1375, the Broad River Chiefdom, centered on the McCollum Mound, collapsed. Likely caused by a combination of drought, and warfare with Cofitachequi, the end of Cofitachequi's longtime regional competitor signaled the start of Cofitachequi's rise to power regionally. A large influx of people from the now-abandoned Broad River Chiefdom likely boosted Cofitachequi's population and capacity, enabling a larger workforce to create more earthen monuments like those at Canosi (Mulberry) and Talimeco (Adamson). When De Soto went through the area in 1540, he encountered a few abandoned hunting camps, and roads leading to the McCollum and Blair Mounds, though the towns were reported to be abandoned.

==== Fall of the Middle Savannah River Chiefdom (c. 1375-1390) ====
Drought, as well as warfare involving Ocute and Cofitachequi, greatly affected the Mississippian 'complex-chiefdom' (a polity with more than two tiers of administration) centered on Mason's Plantation near modern day Augusta along the Savannah River, possibly the largest site along the river Savannah. During the 1370s and 1380s, the polity began to abandon their major monumental capitals. such as Red Lake (abandoned around 1380), Mason Plantation mounds (abandoned around 1385), Hollywood (abandoned around 1386) and Spring Lake (abandoned around 1389). Although a small population at the 38AK757 site may've stayed on after the major abandonment period until at least 1400, the Middle Savannah River was, for all intents and purposes, abandoned. The once abandoned Cofaqui, the oldest Mississippian mound site within Ocute, was resettled in 1400 shortly after the abandonment of the Middle Savannah River, possibly founded by taking these refugees. The largest contigent however, fled to coastal groups, forming the bulk of the emerging Irene Phase chiefdom centered on the Irene Mound in Savannah, Georgia. The Irene phase Chiefdom, possibly related to the Timucuan exonym Ybaha/Yupaha for the Coastal southeast groups, was likely organized into three main provinces or site clusters. Along with the core Irene province at the mouth of the Savannah, there were the antecedents of the Guale, possibly centered on the Kenan Field site, and the antecedents of the Orista, centered on the Indian Hill site on St. Helena's Island.

==== Fall of the Rembert Chiefdom (c. 1375-1450) ====
North of the Middle Savannah Chiefdom was a chiefdom centered at the Rembert site, possibly the largest in the entire Savannah River with its largest mound standing at 10 meters, around the same as Cofitachequi's Talimeco. Its dissolution compared to the Middle Savannah River was long and slow. After the 1370s-1380s era of conflict with neighboring polities, though not necessarily Cofitachequi, the first wave of people that left in 1400 went north to form Joara (Burke phase chiefdom) and possibly the Quinahaqui (Low phase) polities. After 1400, political consolidation and military fortifications (like palisades and moats) began to increase in towns subordinate to Rembert, and another wave of people would leave before 1450 to found Tacoru (Tugalo phase chiefdom) and the site was finally abandoned. Considering Rembert's longevity compared to the Middle Savannah Chiefdom, it's possible that Rembert played a role in its demise in collaboration with Cofitachequi. Rembert's principal descendants, Tacoru, Quinahaqui and Joara, went on to become players in the politics between Ocute and Cofitachequi, with Joara and Quinahaqui joining the Cofitachequi regional order while Tacoru likely joined Ocute's.

==== Fall of the Irene phase Chiefdom (c. 1390-1450) ====
After accepting refugees from the Middle Savannah Chiefdom, it seemed like the Irene phase Chiefdom was the next target of Cofitachequi aggression. After 1375, a buffer zone was created on the South Carolina Coast between the Irene phase Orista and the likely Cofitachequi-allied groups on Winyah Bay. The tense situation was heightened after the late 14th century with the Irene acceptance of the remaining Middle Savannah population. Conflict between 1400-1450 would spell the end of the Irene phase Chiefdom, possibly involving a switch in allegiance of the Orista on Saint Helena's Island, who were still in a fairly prestigious position in the region by Spanish contact compared to the fate of Irene itself, which was abandoned and the entire area around it abandoned. The remnant of Irene, the Guale Micoship, seems to have aligned itself with Ocute against Cofitachequi, the two later forming the Yamasee Confederation.

=== First contacts (1520s) ===
Cofitachequi may have come to the attention of the Spanish as early as 1521 when two Spanish ships explored the South Carolina coast. At present day Winyah Bay, near the city of Georgetown, they captured and enslaved about sixty people who said they were subjects of a ruler called Datha or Duhare. Datha may have been the ruler of Cofitachequi, some 90 miles inland from Georgetown. One of the captives, called Francisco Chicora, learned Spanish and visited Spain. He described Datha to Peter Martyr as "white", tall, carried on the shoulders of his subjects, and ruling a large region of towns featuring earthen mounds upon which religious ceremonies were held. Large quantities of pearls and jewels, Chicora said, could be found at Xapira, a town or chiefdom near Datha.

In 1526, inspired by these stories, Lucas Vázquez de Ayllón led 600 people to establish a colony that would exploit the supposed riches of Datha. At Winyah Bay, one of his ships was wrecked and Chicora and others escaped from the Spanish. Ayllon established a settlement near Sapelo Sound in present day Georgia, but he died and the colony was abandoned after three months, the 150 survivors returning to the Caribbean. Ayllón's colony was probably the source of items of European manufacture later discovered by De Soto in Cofitachequi.

=== De Soto and the "Lady of Cofitachequi" (1540) ===
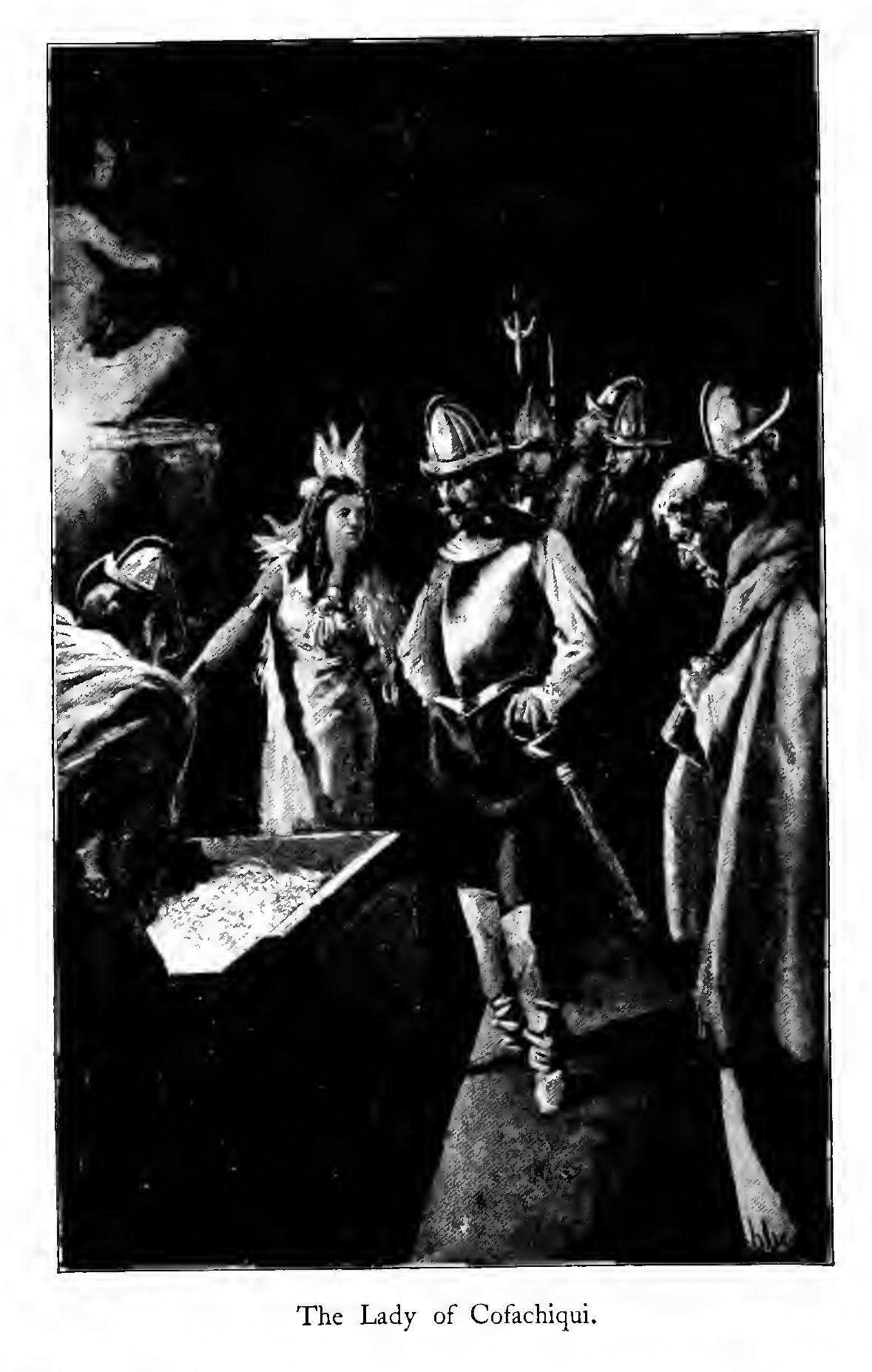
The Lady of Cofachiqui, in the book "De Soto in the land of Florida"

While de Soto was among the Apalachee people in Florida, a captured boy called Perico told him of a province named "Yupaha" ruled by a woman and rich in gold. De Soto decided to strike out for Yupaha—which turned out to be an alternative name of Cofitachequi. In the Spring of 1540, de Soto and his army traveled north through central Georgia to the Oconee River town of Cofaqui in present day Greene County, Georgia, in the chiefdom of Ocute. The people of Calfaqui were aware of Cofitachequi but did not know its exact location. De Soto impressed 700 people from Colfaqui and struck off eastward into a large uninhabited wilderness separating the chiefdoms of Ocute and Cofitachequi. He reached Cofitachequi only after two weeks.

De Soto was met by a woman the chroniclers call the Lady of Cofitachequi who was carried from the town to the river's edge on a litter that was covered with a delicate white cloth. They considered her the leader of the villages. Indeed, she ruled over thousands of subjects as a "paramount chief." After spending several weeks in the village, the Spaniards took the "Lady" as a captive and hostage and headed to the next chiefdom to the northwest, Joara. She eventually escaped. The Spaniards found no gold in Cofitachequi, nor anywhere in its vicinity.

=== Later expeditions ===
Juan Pardo with a force of 125 Spaniards visited Cofitachequi (which he also called Canosi) on two expeditions between 1566 and 1568. Pedro de Torres led 10 Spanish soldiers and 60 native allies to Cofitachequi on two expeditions in 1627–1628. He was "well entertained by the chief who is highly respected by the rest of the chiefs, who all obey him and acknowledge vassalage to him." In 1670, an Englishman, Henry Woodward, journeyed inland from Charlestown, South Carolina to Cofitachequi. He called the chief "the emperor" and said the town counted 1,000 bowmen. The "emperor" of Cofitachequi visited Charleston in 1670 and 1672. Sometime after that, Cofitachequi was abandoned. By 1701, when John Lawson passed through, the area of Cofitachequi was inhabited only by small settlements of the Congaree.

== Government and Military ==
There were three levels of political power at Cofitachequi. The orata was a lesser noble, seemingly in charge of a village or a few villages. The mico was a great noble who occupied one of the administrative centers of the chiefdom, presumably complete with one or multiple mounds. Above these was the gran cacique, the great chief or paramount chief. In traditional anthropology the orataship would be known as the 'simple chiefdom,' with 1 or 2 tiers of administration, the micoship would be the 'complex chiefdom,' with more than 2 tiers of administration, and the gran cacique would be the paramount chiefdom, a type of complex chiefdom with many tiers of administration across a large space. The use of 'chiefdom' however is now considered quite controversial among academic circles, communicating the “subtly racist terminology of the nineteenth century,” by implying a inferiority to "states" or "kingdoms". Lesser officials were ynihas, or ynanaes, who were chiefs' assistants, perhaps comparable to magistrates. The yatikas were interpreters and spokesmen who spoke many languages.

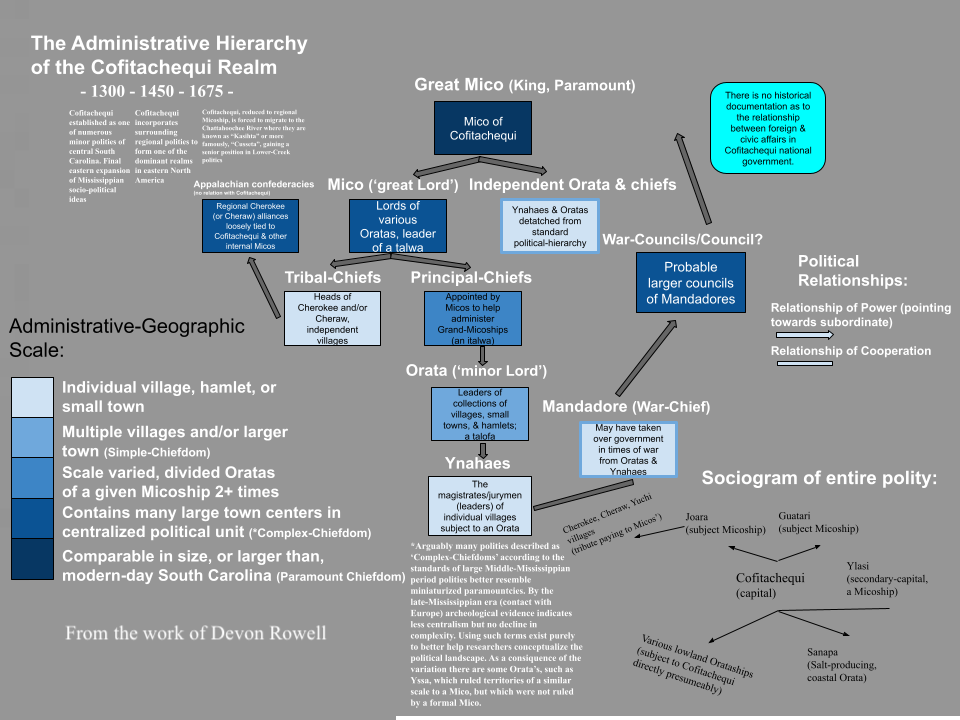
A chart showing the political hierarchy of the Cofitachequi kingdom/paramountcy and all of its layers and connections

== Language ==
The people of Cofitachequi are often described as Muskogean speakers based on etymology of many of their place names from the Juan Pardo Expedition, but that has been disputed. The area of influence of Cofitachequi almost definitely included Siouan and Iroquoian (Cherokee) speakers, however.

Linguist Blair A. Rudes analyzed sixteenth-century placenames from Cofitachique/Canos to Xualla. Rudes used the term Cofitachique in a broad sense to include all the towns that are supposed to have been part of the Cofitacheque chiefdom, or that were allies. He claims that previous attempts to use recorded placenames to identify the sixteenth-century inhabitants with eighteenth-century tribes have been flawed: "Previous research on the etymology of place names from Cofitchequi might best be characterized as long on speculation and short on rigor. While etymologies have been proposed for many of the place names, few stand up to careful review. Unfortunately, the weaknesses in prior analyses have not prevented researchers from using the results to draw sweeping conclusions about the ethnic and linguistic composition of the area. Rudes goes on to suggest that while Booker, Hudson, and Rankin follow John Swanton's proposal that “Muskogean-speaking people were a major constituent of the population”, a careful analysis of the evidence does not support that conclusion." Though Hudson et al. put forward several place names in the Cofitachequi orbit as Muskogean, Rudes finds only one to be of Muskogean origin, that of Talimeco/Talomeco. But this name, he argues, is likely not an indigenous place name, but a descriptive name given by a Muskogean speaking interpreter. The name simply means a town wherein a chief resides or chiefs’ town. Therefore, of all the sixteenth-century placenames recorded for towns from Cofitachequi to Guasili, Rudes claims that none, based on linguistic evidence, appear to have been Muskogean towns.

Rudes also proposes that the coastal groups in South Carolina which Cofitachequi held influence over, commonly known in English records as the 'Cusabo' were Taino-speaking instead of Muskogean speaking as commonly assumed based on the place names and the 10 or so words accumulated in the 16th and 17th centuries.

== Population ==
Some scholars speculate that Cofitachequi politically controlled a cluster of towns around present-day Camden, an 80 to 100 mile (130–160 km) stretch of the Wateree River and vicinity in South Carolina, and a similar portion of the Pee Dee River. More distant towns in the piedmont of North Carolina and the coastal plains of South Carolina may have paid tribute to Cofitachequi, but retained a measure of freedom. For example, Charles Hudson listed more than 30 towns that might have been under the control of Cofitachequi, indicating a population of the chiefdom of several tens of thousands of people.

== Other sites and personages encountered by the De Soto Expedition ==
- List of sites and peoples visited by the Hernando de Soto Expedition
- Mississippian culture
- Southeastern Ceremonial Complex
