= Belmont Neck Site =

Archaeological site in South Carolina, United States

- Belmont Neck Site - 38KE06
- U.S. National Register of Historic Places
- Nearest city: Camden, South Carolina
- Area: 853.3 acres (345.3 ha)
- Built: 1200
- NRHP reference No.: 05001578
- Added to NRHP: February 3, 2006

The Belmont Neck Site is a historic archaeological site located near Camden, Kershaw County, South Carolina. From about 950 to 1300 A.D., the Belmont Neck Site was the location of a platform mound and town associated with the Native American chiefdom of Cofitachequi. It appears to be the first of 12 mound towns along the Catawba/Wateree River. From approximately 1772 to 1796, it was the location of indigo production by Colonel John Chesnut of Camden.

It was listed on the National Register of Historic Places in 2006.
