= Waterie =

Waterie may refer to:

- A wagtail, especially a pied wagtail
- A misspelling or alternative spelling of watery or wateree
