= Tougaloo =

Tougaloo may refer to:

- Tougaloo, Mississippi, United States
  - Tougaloo College

== See also ==
- Tugaloo, a Cherokee town on the Tugaloo River near present-day Toccoa, Georgia
