= Ocute =

Native American paramount chiefdom

Ocute/Tama
- c. 1275–1660s/1717
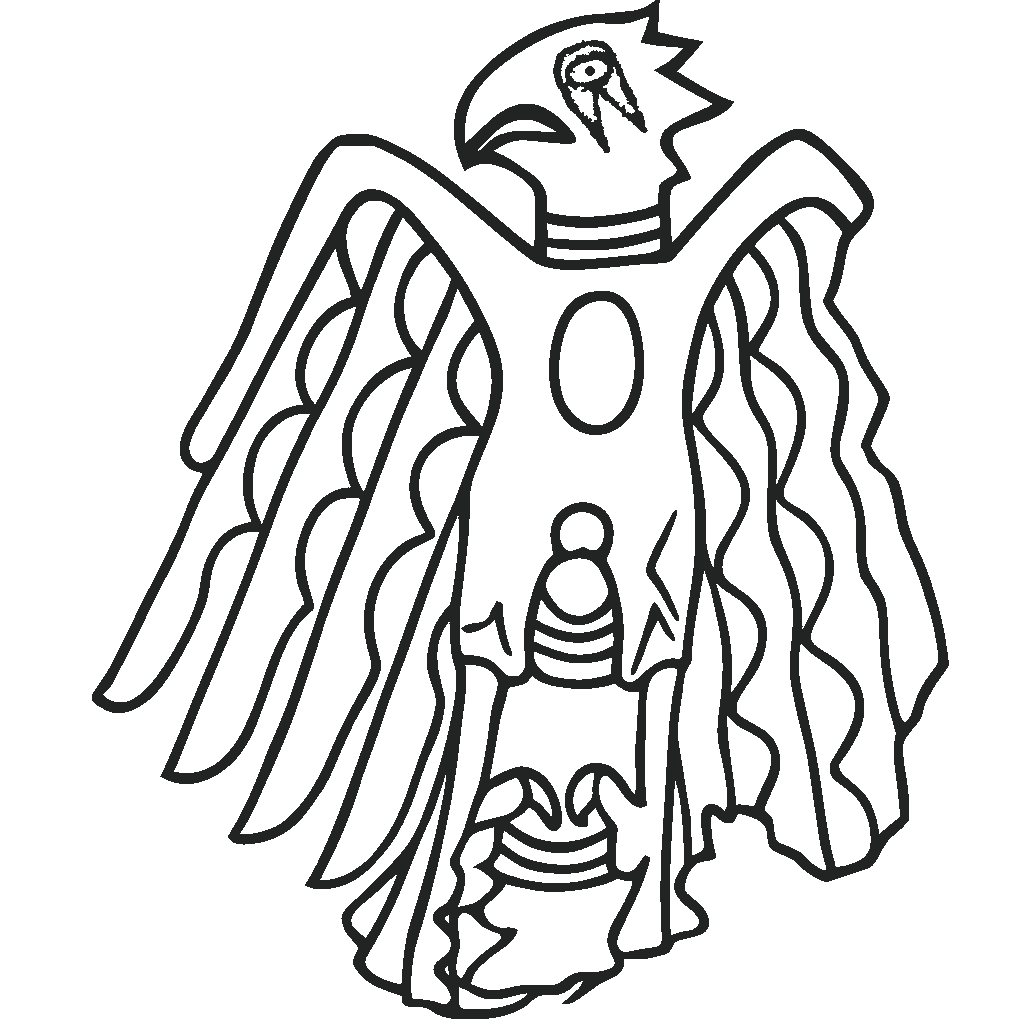
- Symbol on the Copper Headdress of an Ocute/Altamaha Mico

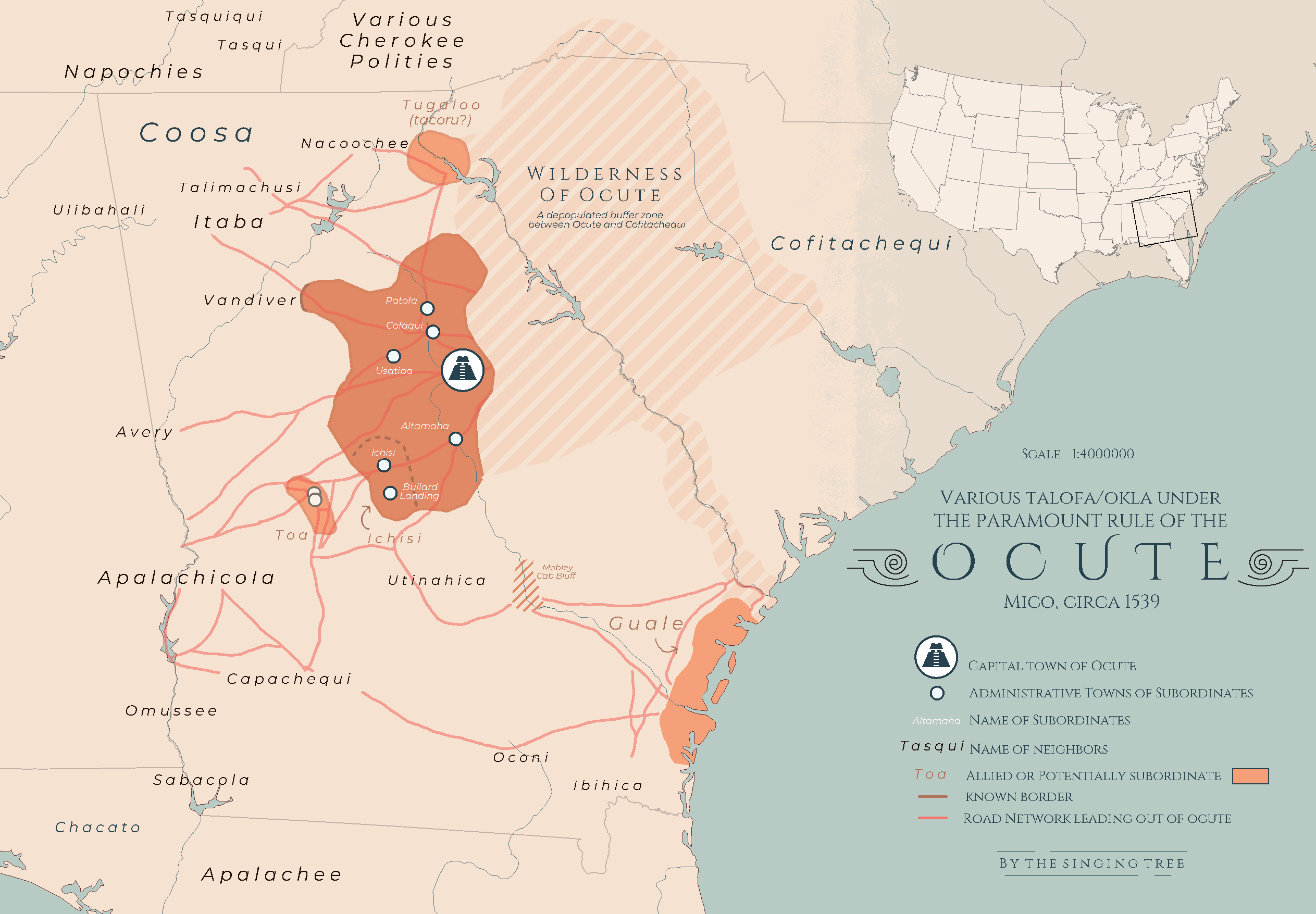
- A map showing Ocute circa 1539 before the Hernando de Soto Expedition
- Status: Mississippian-culture micoship
- Location: Oconee River
- Capital: Shinholser site (c. 1275–1325); Shoulderbone site/Ocute (c. 1325–1540); Shinholser site/Altamaha (c. 1540–1660)
- Common languages: Yamasee; Hitchiti?
- Demonyms: Ocuti? Yamasee?
- Government: Monarchy
- Mico of Ocute
  - c. 1717: Olonso/Alonso
- Mico of Altamaha
  - c. 1540: Zamumo
  - c. 1717: Don Antonio de Ayala
- Historical era: Late Mississippian period
  - Established: c. 1275
  - Founding of the Shoulderbone Site: c. 1325
  - War with Cofitachequi: 15th century
  - Abandonment of the Savannah River: c. 1450
  - De Soto arrives in Ocute: April 2, 1540
  - Disestablished: 1660s/1717
Preceded by
Cofaqui-Patofa
Succeeded by
Apalachicola Province
Yamasee Confederation
Apalachee Province
- Today part of: Georgia

Ocute, later known as La Tama for its southern capital of Altamaha and sometimes known to scholars as the Oconee Province, was a Late Mississippian paramount chiefdom in the U.S. state of Georgia, encountered by Europeans in the 16th and 17th centuries. Centered in the Oconee River valley, the Mico (or "great cacique") of Ocute held sway over the immediate neighbors of Altama, Cofaqui, and Patofa, from its initial alliance formation in 1325 till its relocation to the Apalachicola and Yamasee Provinces by Westo slave raids in the 1660s. The Micoship of Ocute as first encountered by Hernando De Soto was likely formed as an alliance between two chiefdoms on the Oconee River, Cofaqui/Patofa and Altamaha/Ocute. The capital of the Oconee Province, the Shoulderbone Site, was founded around 1325, perfectly equidistant from Altamaha-Ocute (at the Shinholser site) and Cofaqui-Patofa (on the Dyar site).

This alliance was solidified by the arrival of refugees from the Savannah River, fleeing from the rising hegemon of Cofitachequi, who grew to encompass the majority of South Carolina and parts of North Carolina. Scholars have speculated the expansion of Ocute's sphere of influence to regions like Guale Mayor-Micoship (another Savannah River refugee destination) on the Georgia Coast, Tugaloo (last of the Savannah River chiefdoms), and Ichisi (on the Ocmulgee River). The wars between Ocute and her allies against Cofitachequi virtually emptied out the Savannah, Saluda and Broad River basins, creating a buffer zone known as the Despoblado of Ocute (translated variously as wilderness or desert).

By the time of the De Soto Expedition, Ocute was regularly organizing raids and defences against Cofitachequi. After being provided with a couple thousand laborors by the Mico of Ocute, De Soto collaborated with Lord Patofa, whose territory lay on the northern edge of the Oconee River, to attack Cofitachequi.

The province remained a significant regional power into the 17th century, although Altamaha eclipsed Ocute as the primary center, leading the Spanish to refer to the paramountcy as La Tama. In the 1660s, La Tama fragmented due to slave raids by the English-allied Westo people. Some fragments of Ocute proper would relocate to the Apalachicola Province on the Chattahoochee River, one of the founding provinces of the Muscogee Confederation. However, the majority likely relocated to their coastal allies and reemerge as the Yamasee. Altamaha, Ocute, Ichisi, and possibly Toa would reorganize themselves into the Lower Yamasee towns of Okatee, Chechessee, and Euhaw, still headed by Altamaha. The Yamasee would serve as a powerful mercenary force of the English Carolinas, until their quarrel and subsequent end in the Yamasee War.

The towns of the Apalachicola Province moved from the Chattahoochee River to the area in the early 1690s, settling primarily around Ochese Creek, today known as the Ocmulgee River (after one of those towns). Another of the towns, Oconee, settled on what is now known as the Oconee River. All of those towns returned to the Chattahoochee River in 1715.

== External relations ==
Ocute was a sizable paramount chiefdom, a political organization in which multiple chiefdoms are subsumed under one political order. The core area comprised three chiefdoms located in the Oconee River valley in the Georgia Piedmont: Ocute, Altamaha, and Cofaqui. Each included a main town and mounds along with various associated settlements, with the chief of Ocute being paramount.

=== On The Savannah River (Tacoru) ===
To the east lay a vast uninhabited area on both sides of the Savannah River which Spanish chroniclers referred to as the "desert of Ocute" or the "wilderness of Ocute". Beyond the wilderness were Ocute's great enemies, the chiefdom of Cofitachequi in present-day eastern South Carolina. In earlier times the Savannah River area had been densely populated and home to sizable chiefdoms, but it was entirely abandoned by about 1450, apparently due to the conflict between Ocute and Cofitachequi.

The last remnant of the various Savannah River Chiefdoms was the Tugalo Oratate (territory ruled by an Orata) at the headwaters of the Savannah. This may have been the Tacoru Orata encountered by Spanish explorer Juan Pardo, 2 decades after De Soto, when Tacoru Orata was encountered among a group of Orata whose territory was located near Tugalo. The Tacoru Oratate/Savannah Headwaters Chiefdom has been speculated by Oconee River archaeologist Mark Williams and by Charles Hudson to be subservient or at least allied to Ocute.

=== On the Ocmulgee River (Ichisi) ===
In chronicles of the De Soto Expedition, the chiefdom of Ichisi, located to the southwest, along the Ocmulgee River at the Lamar Mounds and Village Site, was described to be at least in amity with Ocute, if not subservient. Rangel, secretary to De Soto and considered the most reliable account, describes the subjects of Ocute to be "Zamumo [Altamaha] and those others." The only other "caciques" mentioned thus far were those of Ichisi, the immediate paragraph before. Dyar Phase (Ocute material culture) sites have also been found on the Ocmulgee just north of the Cowarts Phase (presumably Ichisi). Ichisi would join Ocute and Altamaha on their transformation to become the Yamasee, Ichisi being represented by the Yamasee town of "Chechessee," subject to the Yamasee town of Altamaha.

=== On the Flint River (Toa) ===
After going from Capachequi on the Chickasawhatchee River (subject of Apalachee), the De Soto expedition arrived in the Lamar Culture Chiefdom of Toa on the Flint River. The lack of warfare between Toa and Ichisi, and the lack of a buffer zone makes it possible that Toa was at least allied to Ocute, perhaps one of "those others" described by Rangel (see the section on Ichisi above). Regardless of the level of affiliation, Toa was at least informally dominated by Ocute, the dominant power in the Georgia Piedmont. Toa might've later joined Ichisi, Ocute, and Altamaha in the Yamasee Confederation as the town of Euhaw, subject to Altamaha.

=== On the Georgia Coast (Guale) ===
The Guale Mayor-Micoship lived on the Georgia coast to the southeast, downstream from Ocute. Another destination for refugees of the Savannah River, the Guale are represented by the Irene Phase, and a century before contact likely had their capital at the Irene Mound site, under modern day Savannah, Georgia. Links like similar language, confederation post-contact, and the appearance of Dyar Phase sites on the coast, makes the likelihood of at least alliance between the Guale and Ocute possible, if not outright paramount rule.

== Names ==
Ocute was first encountered by Europeans in the De Soto Expedition, which is recorded in five different accounts. De Soto's secretary, Rodrigo Rangel, considered the most reliable, and the Portuguese Gentleman of Elvas, name the polity Ocute, while Biedma, the royal factor, calls it Ocuti. Garcilaso the Incan, a secondary source who misplaces most names, calls it Cofa.

During the late 16th to the 17th centuries, the southern capital of Altamaha overtook Ocute as the primary center of power, and 17th century Spanish expeditionaries would know the paramount chiefdom as La Tama and the Chozas Expedition of 1597 named a province north of Tama called Quaque, likely the Ocute of the 16th century.

== History ==
=== The Woodland Period (150-1100) ===
The area first saw substantial population around A.D. 150, during the Middle Woodland period. At least three mound centers – Cold Springs, Little River, and Lingerlonger – developed, along with smaller settlements. The inhabitants had similar ceramics styles and there is little evidence of corn agriculture in this period. During the Late Woodland period, the mound sites were abandoned and the population dispersed. Inhabitants developed simple pottery known as Vining Stamped ware, and primarily lived in small, corn-farming homesteads in and around the Oconee valley.

=== The Mississippian Period (1100–1540) ===
==== Initial Mississippianization and Cofaqui-Patofa (1100–1275) ====
Around 1100 the Mississippian culture took hold in the Oconee province. The Mississippian Period was defined by intensive maize agriculture, lordship-like political organization, a reimagined deities and philosophy. The regional variation of Mississippian in this region is known as the Savannah Culture. Ceramics styles shifted to "complicated stamped" pottery, and the residents established mound centers, starting by reoccupying the Middle Woodland period Cold Springs mound. This was apparently the first chiefdom in the Oconee valley, although the town evidently relocated to the Dyar site around 1200 and then to the Scull Shoals site in about 1275, then back to Dyar in 1400 and splitting into Cofaqui and Patofa ~1500, with Cofaqui at Dyar and Patofa at Scull Shoals.

==== The rise of Altamaha-Ocute and the establishment of Ocute (1275–1540) ====
Also around 1275, a second, probably independent chiefdom developed at the Shinholser site 55 miles south, the ancestor of Altamaha and Ocute. During this period from 1275 to 1325, Altamaha-Ocute grew more powerful and prestigious. Their mico c. 1300 would don a copper headdress with the falcon, a symbol of war and power. A third mound center was established in 1325, the Shoulderbone site. It was almost exactly equidistant to Cofaqui-Patofa and Altamaha-Ocute, possibly signaling some form of an alliance or union between the 2 chiefdoms. The creation of Ocute. The Shinholser site would slowly siphon population into the Shoulderbone site, mostly vacating by 1350, not to be reestablished until after 1500. The establishment of Ocute signaled a shift to a new age, the Lamar period, a development out of the Savannah culture, characterized by frequent warfare and a shift towards secularization by Mississippian lords.

The Shoulderbone site is 8 miles east of the Oconee River along a key trail to the Savannah River, suggesting its location may have been chosen to trade with or defend against people to the east. For a time, the Oconee province interacted with the Savannah Valley chiefdoms. These chiefdoms thrived in the 14th and 15th centuries, but were abandoned entirely by 1450, with at least part of the population moving west into the Oconee province. It appears that increasing enmity with the South Carolina paramount chiefdom eventually known as Cofitachequi was a major factor driving the abandonment of the Savannah. This created the "wilderness of Ocute", which served as a buffer zone against Cofitachequi. The Shinholser site was reestablished as the micoship of Altamaha after 1500, as well as the middle woodland-period Little River mound site, possibly the micoship of Usatipa. This period might've been a time of revival, a renaissance of sorts, for times past.

=== De Soto expedition (1540) ===
By 1540, the population had expanded considerably. There were at least five mound centers (although the Shoulderbone site's population had declined dramatically) and several hundred smaller towns and other settlements. Ocute enters the historical record in the chronicles of the expedition of Spanish conquistador Hernando de Soto, which came through the chiefdom in 1539 on its way to Cofitachequi. They had learned about Ocute from two young men they had captured in Apalachee in present-day Florida.

De Soto came to the chiefdom of Ichisi on March 25, 1539, and told the locals he would be merciful if their chief submitted. He visited two small towns and entered the main town of Ichisi, at the Lamar Mounds and Village Site, on March 30. The chief of Ichisi cooperated fully, and informed the Spanish about the nearby paramount chief, Ocute. De Soto erected a wooden cross on one of the mounds before heading to Ocute.

On April 3, the Spanish approached the chiefdom of Altamaha, led by a chief named Zamuno, who always bore arms in case of attack by Cofitachequi. It is unclear if De Soto entered the main town at the Shinholser site. Zamuno exchanged gifts with De Soto and asked if he should pay tribute directly to him, instead of to his overlord at Ocute. De Soto replied that the previous relationship should stand. De Soto erected a cross and left behind a cannon somewhere in the chiefdom. He summoned the paramount chief of Ocute, and then visited his main town, apparently at the Shoulderbone site, on April 9. He received gifts and set up another cross, and the army rested for two days. On April 12, De Soto visited another subject chiefdom, Cofaqui, presumably at the Dyar Site, then north to Patofa, presumably at the Scull Shoals Site. The lord Patofa was described to be a captain-general, another militaristic figure like Zamuno, and may have joined De Soto in a raid against Cofitachequi.

De Soto then determined to set out for Cofitachequi. The people of Ocute explained that the great wilderness separated them, and that no one alive had ever crossed it due to the war, despite what De Soto's guide had claimed. Nevertheless, the army departed on April 13. A party from Ocute initially joined the Spanish to raid Cofitachequi, but De Soto sent them home upon realizing there was no easy way through the wilderness.

=== La Tama and later history (1540–1630) ===
The paramount chiefdom changed substantially in the late 16th century. A large impetus was apparently the founding of Spanish St. Augustine in 1565, which caused Indian polities to realign in response to the new regional power center. Ocute's population dispersed from the mound centers in favor of decentralized farmsteads, and some began migrating into Spanish Florida. The mounds themselves were no longer used after about 1580. However, the total population continued increasing until about 1600. In this period, Altamaha eclipsed Ocute as the paramount town; contemporary Spanish records refer to the province as "La Tama", derived from Altamaha. Perhaps this was due to southern trade to the Atlantic, perhaps it was the gifts brought by De Soto that enriched Zamuno's prestige.

The Spanish sent several expeditions to La Tama between 1597 and 1628, beginning with a Franciscan mission that hoped to proselytize the province, the Chozas Expedition. He encountered La Tama (altamaha), Quaque (ocute), Talufa (patofa), and Usatipa (the little river chiefdom?). The mission was warmly received in Altamaha, where the people nominally accepted Christianity. At Ocute, however, the chief threatened to kill them if they proceeded, a memory of the De Soto's invasion, and Altamaha also became hostile, so the mission returned to Spanish territory. A military venture in 1602 found La Tama to be a fertile, populous province, and the chief of La Tama visited Spanish Governor Pedro de Ibarra in Guale in 1604. The Spanish determined La Tama would be a valuable region to colonize, but never realized their plans to do so.

In the 1620s, the Spanish sent five military expeditions to investigate rumors of mines and other Europeans in the interior, but only two reached La Tama, in 1625 and 1627. The first crossed the Wilderness of Ocute but was turned back at Cofitachequi due to the old war, while the second was allowed into Cofitachequi. After this, Spanish expansion efforts focused on the Timucua and Apalachee provinces west of St. Augustine rather than Georgia.

=== Decline and the Yamasee Confederacy (1630–1717) ===
By around 1630, European diseases struck the province, and the population began to decline precipitously. In 1661 and 1662, Guale and Tama were raided by the Westo, a group allied to the English who used flintlock muskets and were heavily involved in the Indian slave trade. Many La Tama people were enslaved, and the rest abandoned the Oconee valley entirely. Some survivors scattered to the nearby Muskogean and Escamacu chiefdoms, while others fled to the provinces of the Guale, Apalachee, and Timucua in Spanish Florida. Thereafter, they were among the peoples who became known as the Yamasee, who numbered between 700 and 800 in Florida in 1682.

In the Apalachee Province, a mission called "Nuestra Señora de la Candelaria de Tama" or "La Purificación de Tama" was established close to San Luis, the capitol of Apalachee Province, in 1675. There were 300 people in two settlements at the mission in 1675, growing to 400 by 1689, but declining after that as Yamasees left to move closer to the English. The mission may have lasted until 1704, when the remaining Yamasees moved to English territory in the aftermath of the destruction of the Apalachee Missions.

In the Apalachicola Province of the Muscogee Confederacy, a town was established between 1675 and 1685 called as Ocuti. This was recorded as a Yamasee-speaking town, and was probably a contingent of Ocute that fled to Apalachicola. After banning Yamasees in the province in the 1680s due to suspicions of English collaboration, the Ocuti left, presumably to join their Yamasee brothers on the coast and participated in the Yamasee War, as by the next census in 1716 they had vanished.

Once transferred to the Guale and Timucuan Mocama provinces, La Tama refugees established four towns descended from the ancient interior Georgia chiefdoms: Altamaha, Okatee (Ocute), Chechessee (Ichisi), and Euhaw (apparently descended from Toa); Altamaha remained the leading town. Within the Yamassee confederacy, these towns formed the Lower Yamassee, while Guale towns and some others formed the Upper Yamassee. The Yamaseee shifted alliances and later relocated to present-day South Carolina in 1685. They remained a significant power in the Southeast until the British settlers defeated them in the Yamasee War of 1715–1717, after which they integrated into the multiethnic settlements in Spanish Florida.

== Government and military ==
The paramountcy was originally led by the Ocute Mico at the center, who was able to mobilize at least 2,000 porters at his command. Among the subordinate Mico within the Oconee River valley, Patofa, the furthest north, and Altamaha, the furthest south, stand out as particularly militarized provinces, and, considering the longevity of their presence in post-De Soto Spanish chronicles, they were likely 2 of the most important subordinates.

The Patofa Mico was described as a captain-general and organized raids into Cofitachequi. Perhaps the Patofa Mico held a position similar to the Great Warrior of the Apalachicola, the Nicoguadca of the Apalachee, or the Tattooed Serpent of the Natchez; the most prominent warrior, responsible for the machinations of war. The Mico of Altamaha was described as always armed against Cofitachequi, and their succession to Ocute as the primary center later on is a testament to not just their military importance, but politically too.

In general, the Mico would rule over one or so oklas, the base unit of Southeastern organization. Surrounding the Okla were satellite settlements and villages, known as talofa. While there's been no record of it, it is possible Ocute used Ynahaes, justices or sheriffs to the Mico, as they were used throughout the region. The heir to the Mico was the "Prince", nephew (sister's son) to the Mico, the heir apparent. "Beloved Sons" of the Mico, though not able to succeed the Mico, might've bore the hereditary title Usinjulo, characteristic of neighboring Mississippians on the Chattahoochee River and the Tallahassee Red Hills. Alongside the aforementioned offices there existed the Fanni Mico. The Fanni Mico were "adopted" relatives who functioned as a spokesman for his adopted family or nation in the councils of his original family or nation. For example, hypothetically, the ruling family of Ocute may adopt and train a prominent Cherokee nobleman from Kituwa from the Ani-Kutani clan/caste as Fanni Mico. The Cherokee nobleman would then represent Ocute interests in the Kituwa Ani-Kutani Council, trying to sway them against Cofitachequi or towards peace with Ocute allies in the region.
