= Tugaloo River =

River in the United States of America

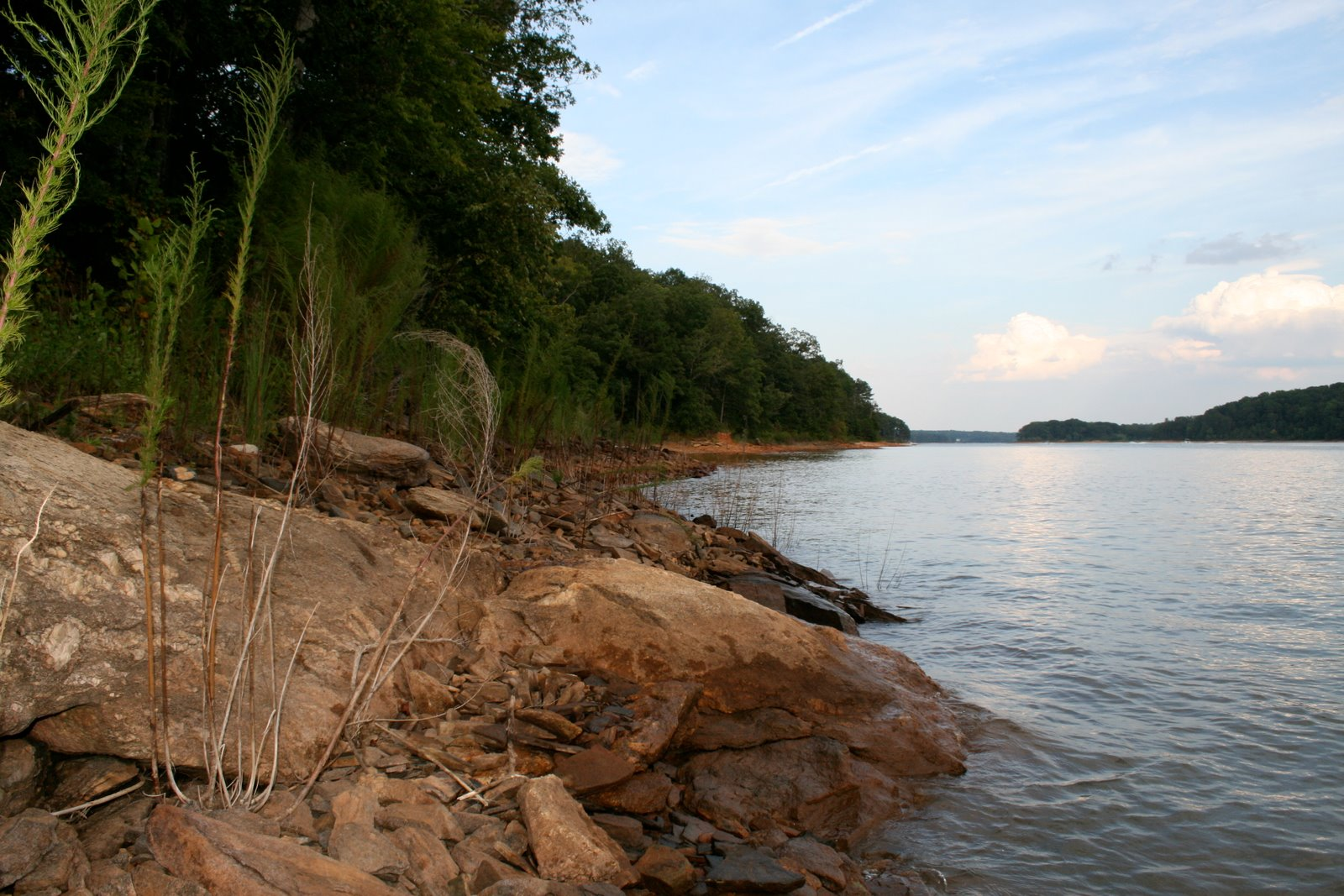
- Bank of the Tugaloo River at Lake Hartwell near the Tugaloo State Park campground

Location
- Country: United States
- States: Georgia, South Carolina

Physical characteristics
- Source: Chattooga River
  - location: Cashiers, North Carolina
  - coordinates: 35°07′08″N 83°07′05″W
  - elevation: 1,187 m (3,894 ft)
- 2nd source: Tallulah River
  - location: Otto, North Carolina
  - coordinates: 35°02′02″N 83°32′28″W
  - elevation: 1,437 m (4,715 ft)
- Source confluence
  - location: Tallulah Falls, Georgia
  - coordinates: 34°43′01″N 83°21′11″W
  - elevation: 279 m (915 ft)
- Mouth: Lake Hartwell, Savannah River
  - location: Fair Play, South Carolina
  - coordinates: 34°26′42″N 82°51′25″W
  - elevation: 204 m (669 ft)
- Length: 45.9 mi (73.9 km)
- Basin size: 2,572 km^{2} (993 sq mi)

Basin features
- Progression: Savannah River → Atlantic Ocean
- River system: Savannah River

The Tugaloo River (originally Tugalo River) is a 45.9-mile-long (73.9 km) river that forms part of the border between the U.S. states of Georgia and South Carolina. It was named for the historic Cherokee town of Tugaloo at the mouth of Toccoa Creek, south of present-day Toccoa, Georgia and Travelers Rest State Historic Site in Stephens County, Georgia.

It is fed by the Tallulah River and the Chattooga River, which each form an arm of Lake Tugalo, on the edge of Georgia's Tallulah Gorge State Park. The Tugaloo flows out of the lake via Tugaloo Dam, passing into Lake Yonah and through Yonah Dam. The river ends as an arm of Lake Hartwell, as does South Carolina's Seneca River which is formed by the confluence of the Keowee River and Twelvemile Creek. Below Lake Hartwell, it is called the Savannah River.

== History ==
Competing state territorial claims to the river and its islands were settled with the Treaty of Beaufort in 1787, as interpreted in the two Georgia v. South Carolina cases before the U.S. Supreme Court in 1922 and 1989. The river is one of the boundaries of the Treaty of Hopewell and the Treaty of New York (1790).

The river's watershed is home to some of the most challenging whitewater in the Southeast, luring sport kayakers and canoeists from all over the country.

Cherokee, pioneer and antebellum history are being highlighted by developments of the Stephens County Foundation along the river. South of Yonah Dam was the former site of Estatoe, a historic Cherokee town. Tugaloo Bend Heritage Park is an 87-acre park established here to interpret this history. It is part of the Tugaloo River Historic Corridor that includes sites from later periods of history, extending south along the river to the former area of the historic Tugaloo town of the Cherokee.

The name of the river comes from Tugaloo (ᏚᎩᎷᏱ), a historic Cherokee town that was located along the river near the mouth of Toccoa Creek.
