= Travelers Rest (Toccoa, Georgia) =

Historic tavern in Georgia, US

- Traveler's Rest
- U.S. National Register of Historic Places
- U.S. National Historic Landmark
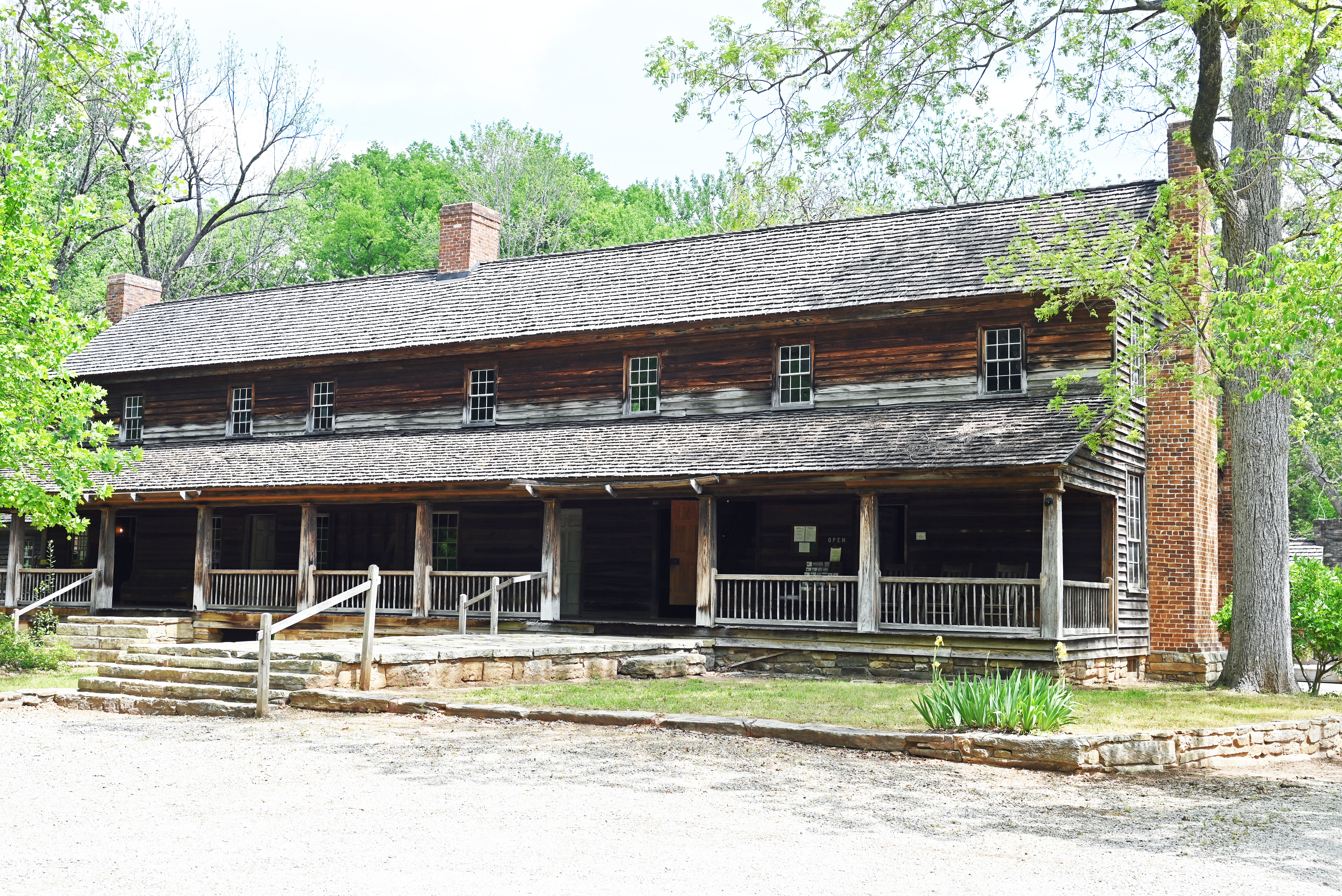
- 2026

- Location within Georgia Location within the United States
- Nearest city: Toccoa, Georgia
- Coordinates: 34.60926°N 83.23878°W
- Area: 4 acres (1.6 ha) (size of landmarked area)
- Built: 1816
- NRHP reference No.: 66000283

Significant dates
- Added to NRHP: October 15, 1966
- Designated NHL: January 29, 1964

Travelers Rest State Historic Site is a state-run historic site near Toccoa, Georgia, United States. Its centerpiece is Traveler's Rest, an early tavern and inn. It was designated a National Historic Landmark on January 29, 1964, for its architecture as a well-preserved 19th-century tavern, and for its role in the early settlement of northeastern Georgia by European Americans.

== Description and history ==
Travelers Rest is about 6 miles (10 km) east of Toccoa, Georgia, near the Tugaloo River, on Riverdale Road just north of United States Route 123. It was built upon historic Cherokee land close to the former Cherokee town of Tugaloo, which is now inundated by Lake Hartwell.

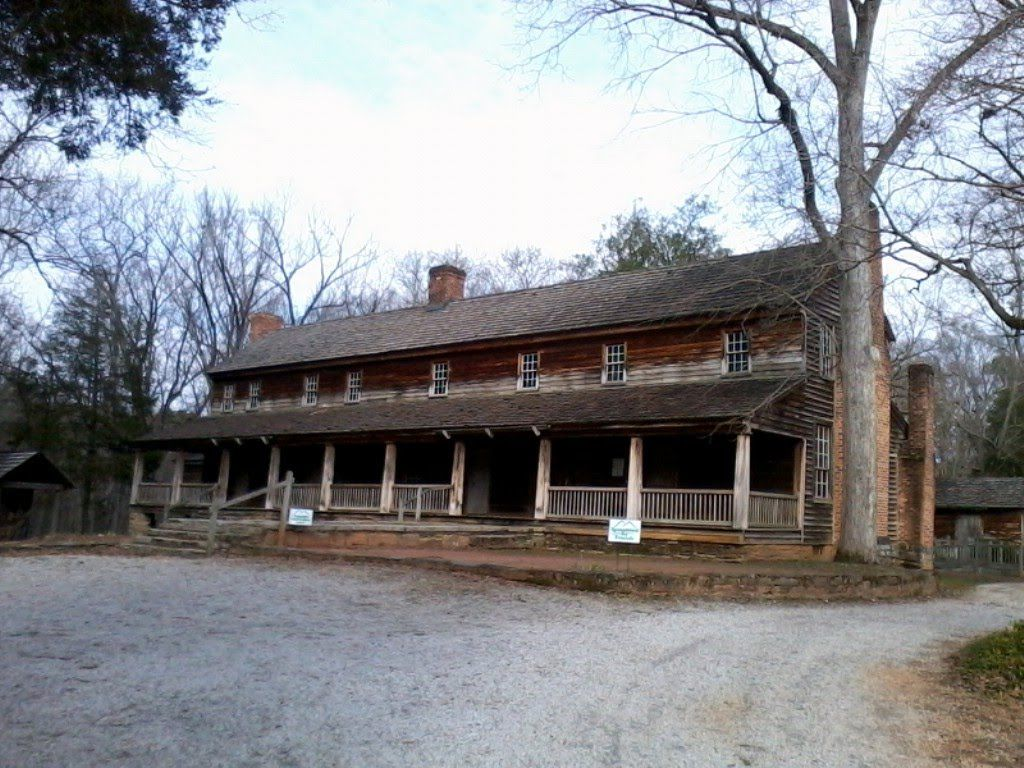
Travelers Rest - 2011

The state granted the land to Major Jesse Walton in 1785 in lieu of payment for his service in the Revolutionary War. Walton, a veteran and political leader, was killed by Cherokee near here in 1789, who resisted encroachment by European Americans.

The Walton family sold the land to James Rutherford Wyly, who built the main part of the house between 1816 and 1825. Wyly opened the house as an inn for travelers on the newly constructed Unicoi Turnpike. Devereaux Jarrett bought the house on August 21, 1838, and made it the headquarters of his vast, 14,000-acre (57 km^{2}) plantation, which he developed with enslaved labor for the cultivation of cotton as a commodity crop. Jarrett also added to the original structure and opened the tavern/inn to the public.

Due to the growing population and increased through traffic, the structure served as an inn, trading post, and post office. While the ten-room house was serving the public, it entertained many illustrious travelers. The Jarrett account books, which doubled as hotel registers, include the name of George William Featherstonhaugh, an English scientist and author.

"Here I got an excellent breakfast of coffee, ham, chicken, good bread, butter, honey, and plenty of good new milk for a quarter of a dollar...What a charming country this would be to travel in, if one was sure of meeting with such nice clean quarters once a-day!"

— George William Featherstonhaugh, Traveler's Rest and Tugaloo Crossroads (, p. 132)

The main building is a large and rambling two-story wood-frame structure, more than 90 feet (27 m) long. It is built from wide pine planking and has six chimneys. One of the fireplaces has a mantle with drawers for storage of valuables. The front porch has seven rooms on each level with separate entrances, and an inside staircase providing access to the second floor. The rear of the house is where the innkeeper's family lived, with public rooms (dining room and parlor areas) in between. The post office was located on the second floor. Today, in addition to the main building, the property includes reconstructions of typical outbuildings of the 19th century, including slave quarters.

The property was held by Jarrett's descendants until 1955, when it was acquired by the state. Today, visitors can tour the house and see many original artifacts and furnishings, some of which were crafted by Caleb Shaw, a renowned cabinetmaker from Massachusetts.

== Photos ==
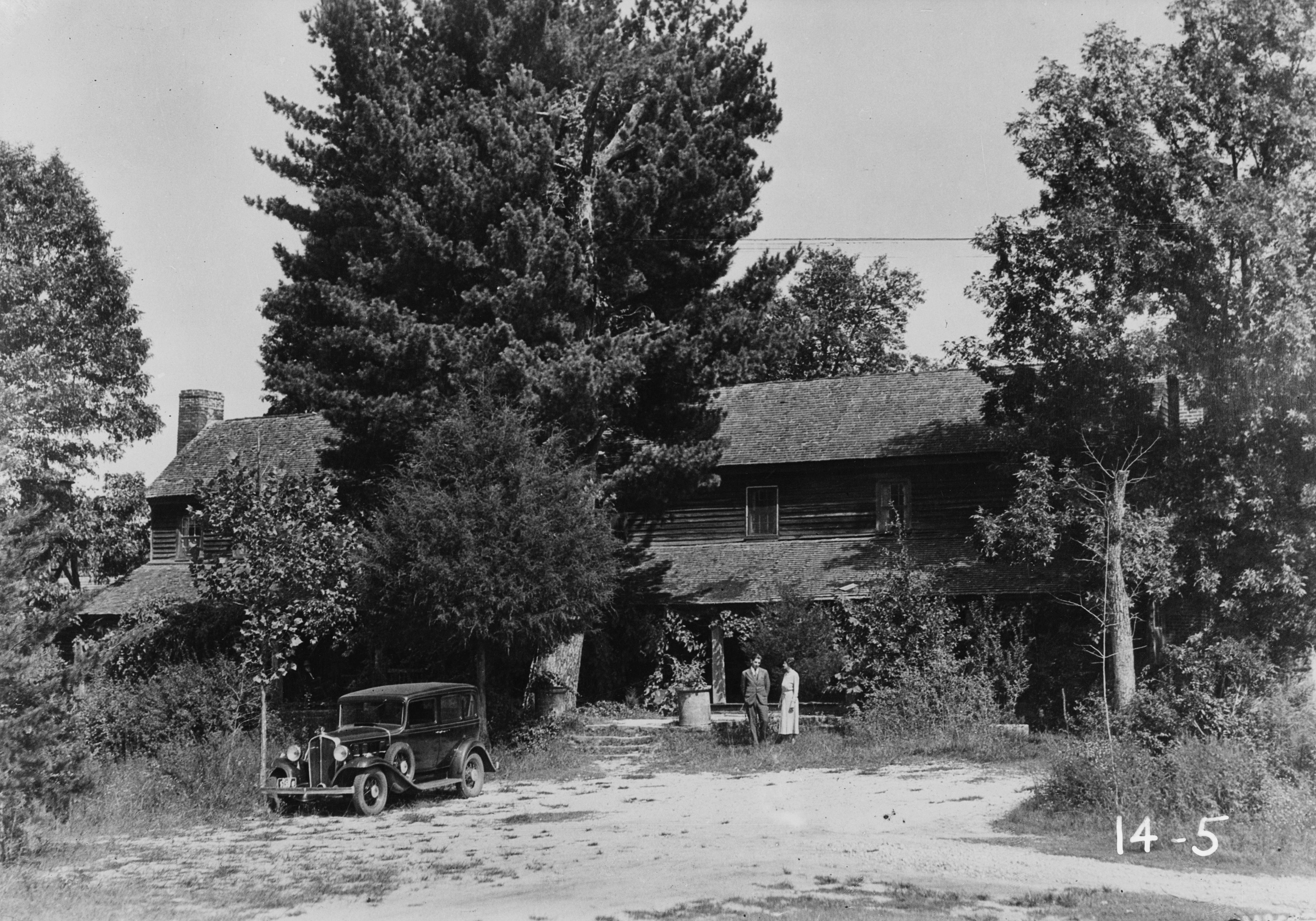
HABS photo, 1934

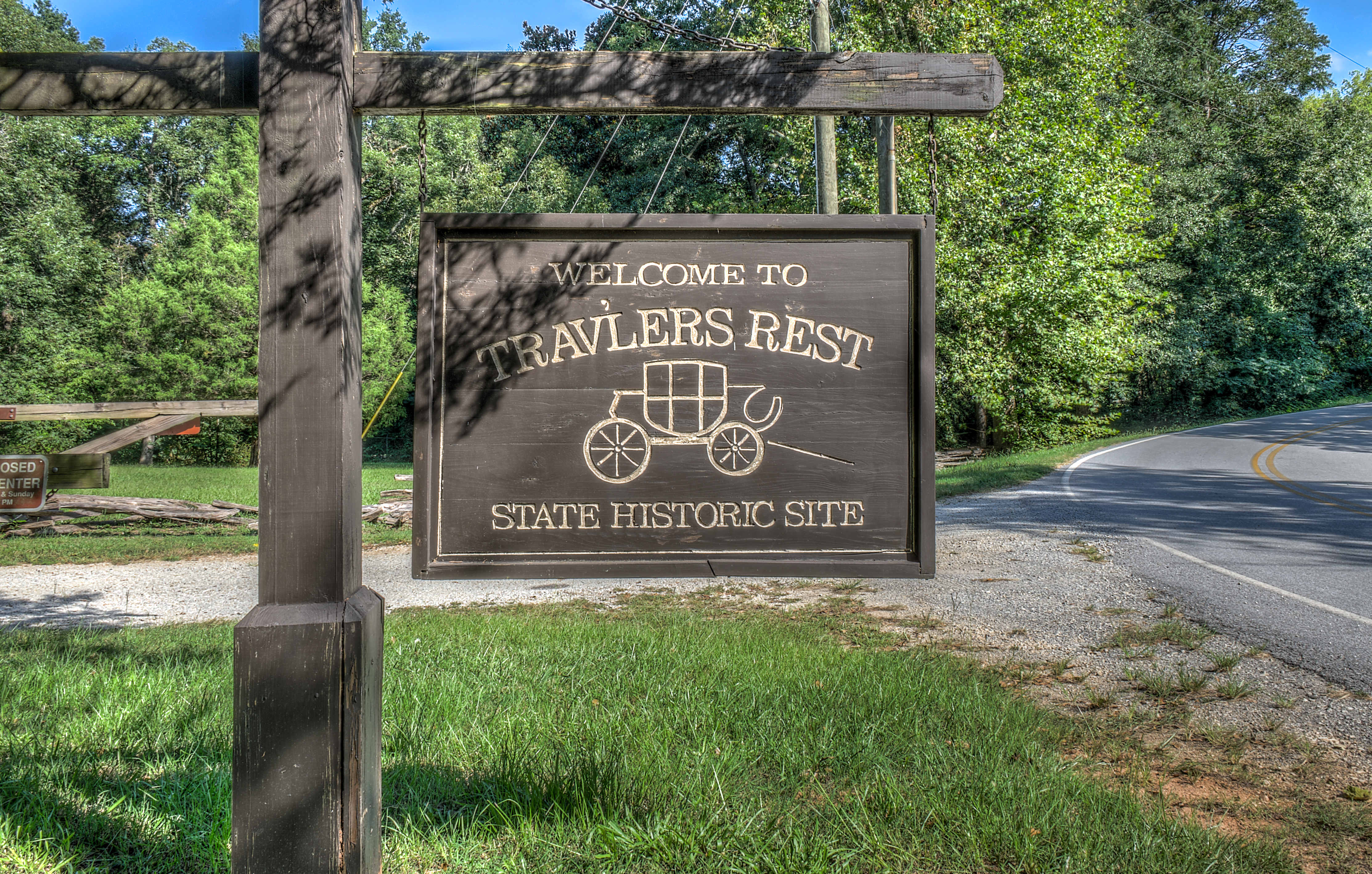
Entrance sign

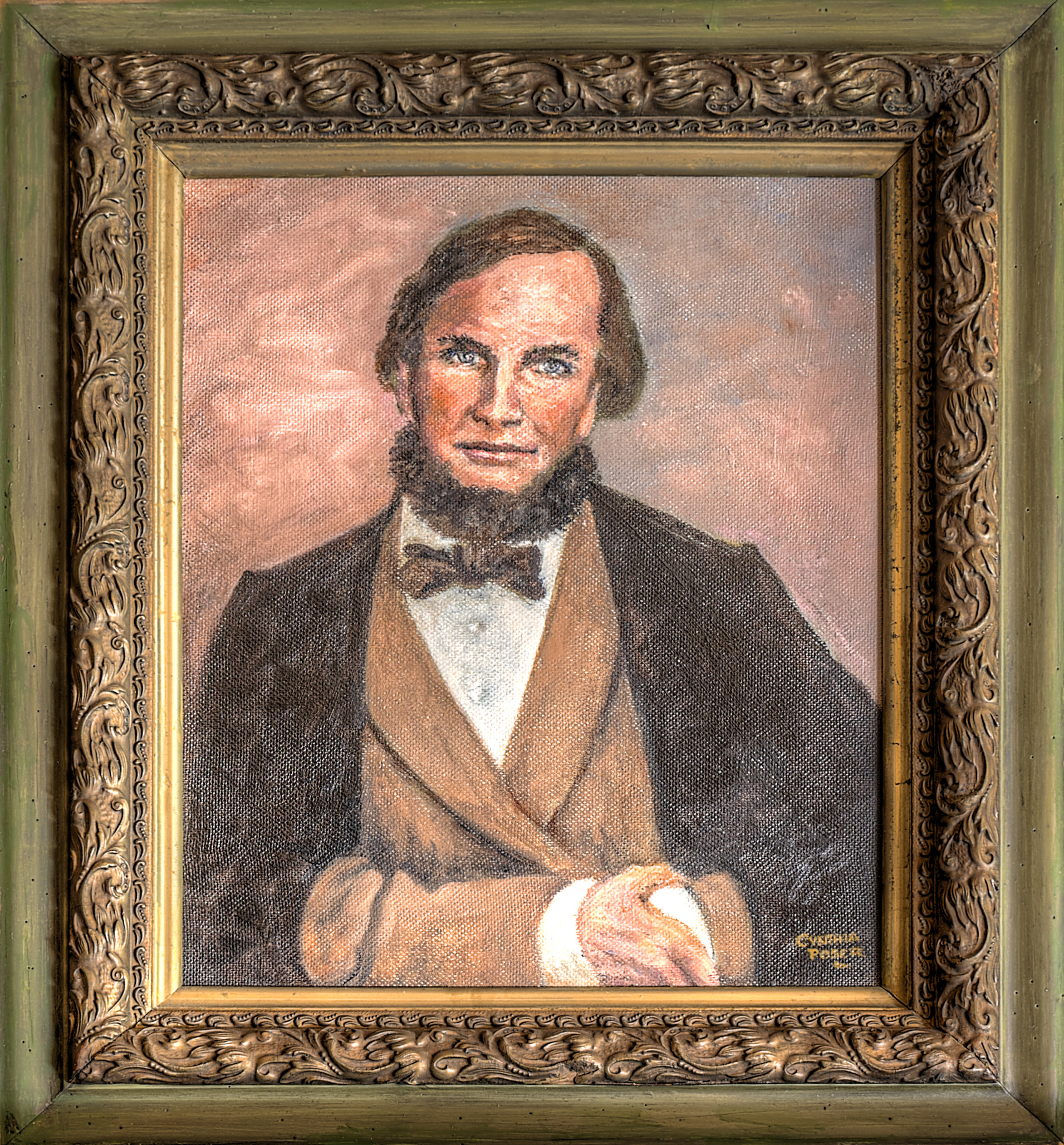
Portrait of Devereaux Jarrett

== See also ==
- List of National Historic Landmarks in Georgia (U.S. state)
- National Register of Historic Places listings in Stephens County, Georgia
