= The Lady of Cofitachequi =

16th century Native American chieftainess

The Lady of Cofitachequi was a Native American woman who served as a Orata of Cofitachequi during the mid-16th century. Though best known for her encounter with the Spanish conquistador, Hernando de Soto, the Lady is also significant as evidence of gender equality in Mississippian society, being the head of a large, multilingual and multiethnic empire. Under the leadership of the Lady of Cofitachequi, trade within the provinces guaranteed access to food, weapons, minerals, and raw materials. The Lady also was able to exercise control over subordinate chiefdoms which reached far into North Carolina. The Spaniards recognized her power as among the greatest of the Southeast leaders.

== Legacy ==
The Lady of Cofitachequi stands as a symbol of both power and resilience. She embodied the capacity of Southeastern women to hold paramount authority in times of crisis, while her kingdom demonstrates the scale of Mississippian political centralization. Modern historians emphasize that Cofitachequi was a union of many towns and peoples, not a single “tribe,” and that its linguistic and cultural diversity is often misunderstood. The persistence of Orada/Olata traditions shows that women’s leadership was integral to the governance of the region long before European contact.

== Early life ==
The Lady of Cofitachequi grew up in the kingdom of Cofitachequi, in modern day South Carolina. Cofitachequi was a matrilineal society, so the Lady gained her title from the enatic (or female) line.

== Cofitachequi ==
Cofitachequi, also known as Yupaha, was situated in the lower Wateree River, centered on the Mulberry mound site in South Carolina. The Catawba, Sugeree, and Waxhaw tribes were original of this geographical area. Languages spoken in the country may have belonged to the Muskogean or Siouan-Catawban language families. It was inhabited from A.D. 1250 to the late 17th century. When the Spanish conquistador, Hernando De Soto, and his men encountered the area in 1540, Cofitachequi extended east to the towns of Llapi and Ylasi close to the Pee Dee River. The territory on the west side stretched to the Oconee River valley. There is no concrete evidence to locate the boundaries of Cofitachequi north or south. What is known is that Cofitachequi was governed by a woman chief known to history as The Lady of Cofitachequi. The site became of relevance to the Spanish conquistador Hernando de Soto because it was said to be a top producer of silver, gold, and pearls. When the Lady of Cofitachequi presented De Soto with minerals original to her territory, only copper, mica, and pearls were observed. Upset about his findings, De Soto ransacked the chieftainess's temple taking with him "200 pounds of freshwater pearls".

=== De Soto hears about Cofitachequi ===
In 1539, the Spanish conquistador, Hernando de Soto and his men invaded the coast of Florida in search of riches. In their expedition, the crew captured Perico, a native boy who possessed extensive knowledge about Cofitachequi and about its tributary subordinated nearby towns. It was from Perico that De Soto first heard about the Lady of Cofitachequi and about the wealth of her kingdom. He offered himself to serve an intermediary between the Spaniards and the Natives of Cofitachequi. In May 1540, the Spanish conquistador and his army set foot in the main town of the Lady's kingdom situated on the Wateree River best known in present time as the Mulberry site.

=== Encounter with De Soto ===
It was at the riverbanks of the Wateree River that De Soto and his men were spotted by the Natives of Cofitachequi. Six Native magistrates along with their servants crossed the river in canoes to meet the Spaniards. As soon as they established contact, they asked, "Sir, do you wish peace or war?" De Soto opted for peace and politely implored for food and canoes. However, the magistrates responded that they would have to talk to their lady about their request as Cofitachequi had recently fall victim of a devastating plague contributing to a lack of food sources. The lady of Cofitachequi, described as a "young marriable woman" of noble character appeared to De Soto and his men accompanied by eight other women aboard a canoe.

=== Alliance with De Soto ===
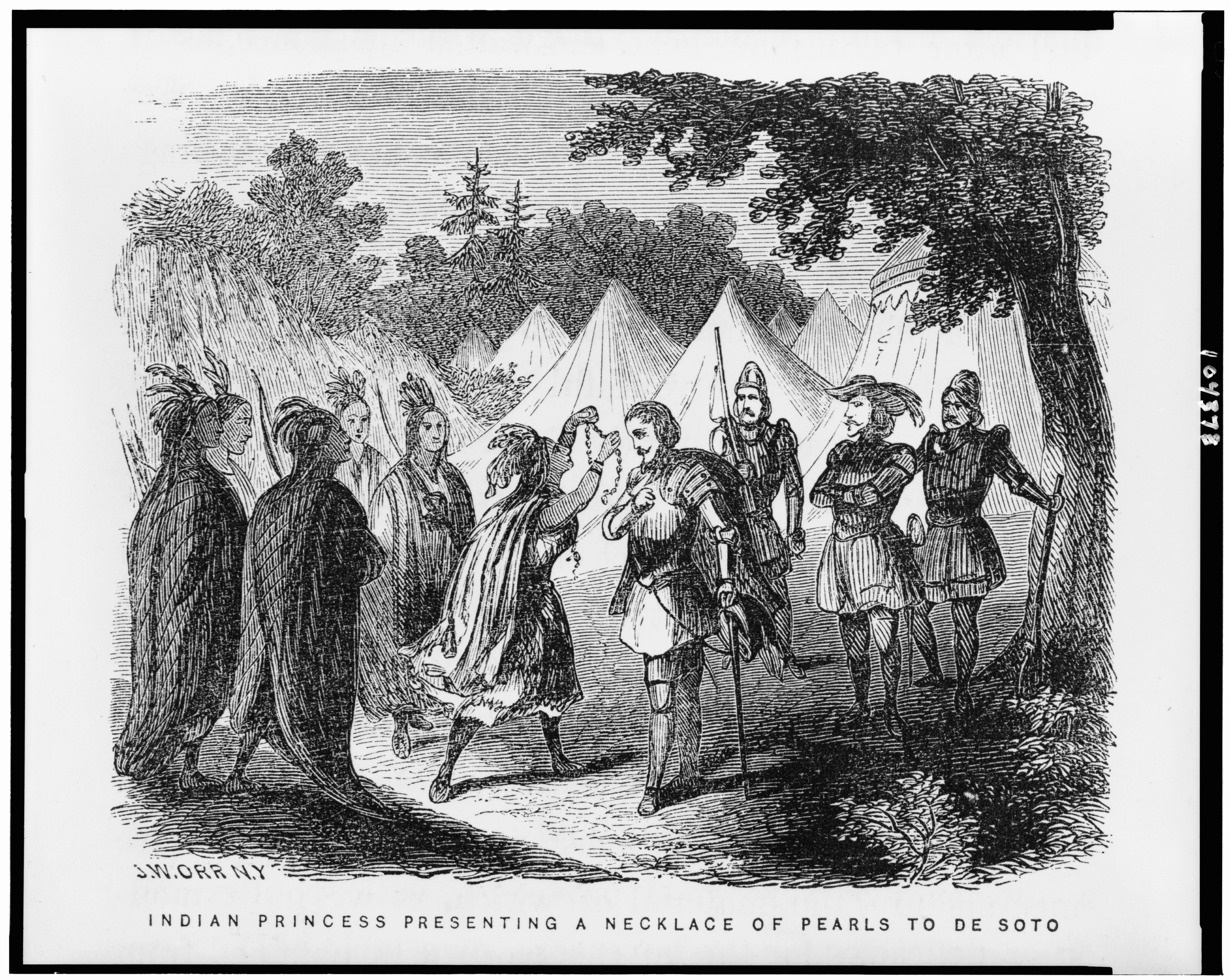
The Lady presenting a necklace of pearls to de Soto - J. W. Orr, N.Y.

As an act of diplomacy, the Lady of Cofitachequi provided the Spanish explorers with basic provisions. An entire storehouse of corn was put at their disposition to serve as a food source. Similarly, she offered her private residence to De Soto while accommodating his soldiers in other dwellings within the village. The Spaniards were also provided with canoes and rafts so that they could transport themselves via water. As an act of peaceful relationships, the Lady gave De Soto her pearl necklace while he gave her a gold ring with a ruby stone. De Soto promised that the king of Spain would recognize the Lady's courteous treatment.

=== Facing opposition ===
The Lady of Cofitachequi's mother did not agree with the Lady's hospitality and generosity towards the Spaniards. As a widow, she had relocated in a different village within Cofitachequi but was still communicated about the Spaniards’ landing. Upon their arrival, she refused to go meet them and was upset that the magistrates had not prevented the meeting between her daughter and De Soto. Regardless of her objection, De Soto sent his men to go find her and bring her to him so that they can establish friendly relationships and prevent opposition. In accordance with De Soto, The Lady of Cofitachequi provided servants to serve the needs of the Spaniards in their journey. She also assigned as guide a noble man who had been raised by her mother. During the trip, the noble Indian decapitated himself with an arrow to show obedience to both the Lady of Cofitachequi and to her mother. He was well aware that the widow did not desire to see the Spaniards and he did not want to disobey her wishes. However, if he refused to guide the Spaniards, The Lady would discharge him from his royal position. Death was his only option to show respect for both women. Since the Spaniards had lost the only person among them that knew about the exact location of the widow, they decided to return to Cofitachequi.

=== Disappearance ===
Initially, the Lady of Cofitachequi's plan was to form diplomatic alliances with the Spaniards. However, after realizing that the Spanish threatened to rob most of her chiefdom's food supplies, natural resources, and precious metals, she decided to disappear. Her hopes were that in her absence and without guidance, De Soto would be forced to leave her kingdom. However, DeSoto and his men traveled to the town of Talimeco where the Lady's house was located along with her temple which one Spaniard described as "among the grandest and most wonderful of all the things he had seen in the New World." The Spaniards looted the temple taking with them large quantities of pearls and animal skins. Eventually, De Soto managed to locate and to take as captive the Lady of Cofitachequi.

=== Escape from captivity ===
DeSoto forced Lady of Cofitachequi to join him and his men as they traveled into the Appalachians. The Lady's presence was necessary as she was the chief leader of tributary villages and at her request De Soto's men could be provided with food and other goods. The Spaniards allowed the Lady to travel in company of her female slaves so that they could attend to her needs. As they travelled throughout her kingdom's domains, Spaniards became aware that “she was very well obeyed, for all the Indians did with great efficiency and diligence what she ordered of them.” Once they entered the town of Joara which geographically marked the end of the lands governed by the Lady, she developed a strategy to escape. She informed De Soto's men that she must "attend to her necessities". Once the Spaniards were out of sight, she ran away with three of her female servants. The Spaniards did not see her again but many believed that she returned to Talimeco to rule her kingdom.
