= Yamasee =

Multiethnic confederation of Native Americans

Total population
- Extinct as a tribe

Regions with significant populations
- United States (Georgia, northern Florida, and South Carolina)

Languages
- Yamasee language (extinct)

Religion
- Yamasee tribal religion

Related ethnic groups
- La Tama, Guale, Seminole, Hitchiti, and other Muskogean tribes

The Yamasee (also spelled Yamassees, Yemasees, Yemassees, and Yamasis) were a multiethnic confederation of Native Americans consisting of the survivors of several chiefdoms in Georgia destroyed by disruptions caused by European explorers and settlers in the 16th and 17th centuries. First coming to the attention of the Spanish in 1663, the Yamasee initially lived near the sea coast from northern Florida to South Carolina. The Yamasee became prominent in the history of South Carolina when they settled near the Savannah River in the 1680s. Allied with the British colonists, they became slave raiders, capturing Indians and trading them for guns and other British products. In 1715, due to a number of grievances, they and several other tribes went to war with the British in what was called the Yamasee War. The war was bloody and threatened the existence of the British colony in South Carolina. After initial successes, the Yamasee were defeated and dispersed. The survivors joined other tribes and the Yamasee soon ceased to exist as an independent people.

The Yamasee, along with their neighbors the Guale, are considered from linguistic evidence by many scholars to have been a Muskogean language people. For instance, the Yamasee term "Mico", meaning chief, is also common in Muskogee.

== Origins ==
In what has been called the Mississippian shatter zone, European expeditions, diseases, and trade in the 16th and early 17th centuries disrupted the American Indian societies of what would become the southeastern United States. The large chiefdoms of the region began to fall apart, replaced by smaller and less populous tribes and confederations. The death-blow to the Ocute, Altamaha, and Ichisi chiefdoms in interior Georgia were the slave raids of the Westo beginning about 1660. The Westo were an Iroquoian people whose customers were colonists in the British colony of Virginia. Some of the refugees from the slave raids moved to Spanish Florida seeking protection from the slavers.

In 1663, Spanish documents began referring to a people called the "Yamasis", the refugees from Ocute and the other chiefdoms. The Yamasis were living in five villages along the Atlantic Ocean coast near the border of Georgia and South Carolina. This was the beginning of loosely-organized bands of refugees from several Indian tribes that the British settlers would call Yamasee.

== European colonization ==
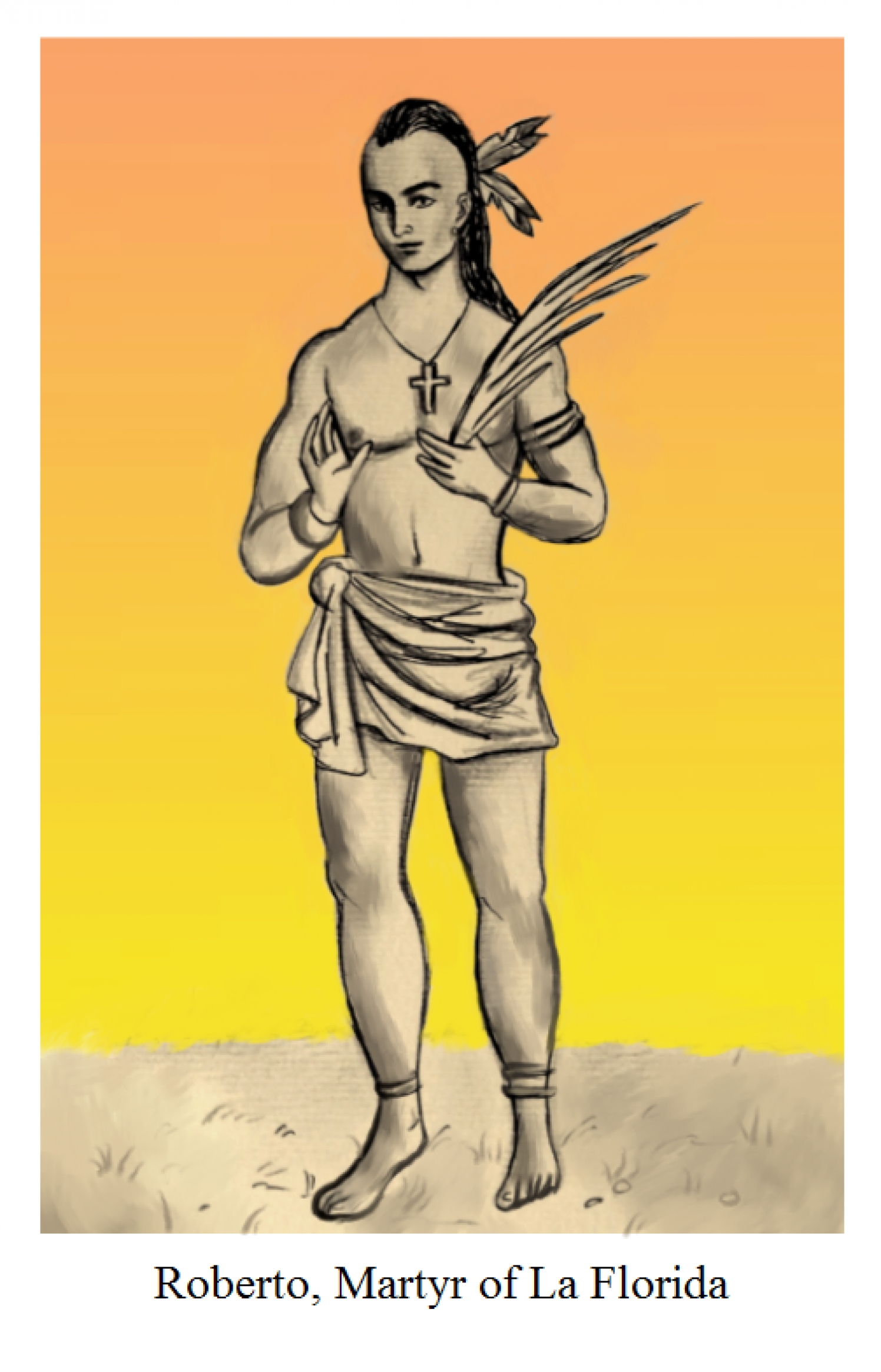
Image of Roberto, Yamasee Roman Catholic martyr (d. 1740)

=== Spanish contact ===
Spain established the town of St. Augustine, Florida in 1665, the first permanent European settlement in the United States. In subsequent years, Spanish soldiers established presidios (forts) and Franciscan missionaries established missions up and down the north Florida, Georgia, and South Carolina coasts. Indian peoples such as the Timucua and Mocama in Florida and Georgia, the Guale in Georgia, and the Cusabo in South Carolina flocked to the Spanish for protection from slavers. They were joined by the Yamasee after 1660. Most of the presidios soon failed but the missions persisted and provided a small measure of protection against slavers.

The Yamasee and the Spanish missionaries were quickly estranged from each other. The Yamasee resisted conversion to Christianity and failed on occasion to provide the labor demanded of them by the Spanish missions. The English settlement in South Carolina in 1670 and the defeat and destruction of the Westo in 1674 gave them an alternative to the Spanish. Moreover, the British had no compunctions about selling them guns. Pirate attacks by the French along the coast were also a problem and in the 1680s most of the Yamasee moved inland to the Savannah River on the border of Georgia and South Carolina.

=== British allies ===
In 1687, some Spaniards attempted to send captive Yamasee to the West Indies as slaves. The tribe revolted against the Spanish missions and their Native allies, and moved into the English colony of the Carolina (present day South Carolina). They established several villages, including Pocotaligo, Tolemato, and Topiqui, in Beaufort County. In the early 18th century the population of the multi-ethnic Yamasee exceeded 4,000.

Scholar Denise Bossy said that "by 1707 all southeastern Indians were either slave raiders or their targets." The Yamasee, despite their past of being victims of slavery, were no exception. The economy of the British colony of South Carolina in the late 17th and early 18th century was based on export of deerskins and capturing and selling Indian slaves. Author Alan Gallay estimated that that between 1670 and 1715, 24,000 to 51,000 captive Indians were exported from South Carolina, more than the number of African slaves imported into South Carolina during that same period.

Yamasee raiders (equipped with European firearms and working in concert with Carolinian settlers) conducted slave raids against Spanish-allied Indian tribes in Florida and Georgia. Indian captives of the Yamasee were transported to colonial settlements throughout Carolina, where they were sold to white colonists; many of these captives were then resold to West Indies sugar plantations, especially to the island of Barbados.

== Yamasee War and aftermath ==
Many Yamasee soon became indebted to the colonists they traded with, as a result of duplicitous colonial mercantile practices. Infuriated by the practices of the colonists, the Yamasees resolved to go to war against them, forming a pan-tribal coalition and initiating a two-year long war by attacking the colonial settlement of Charles Town on April 15, 1715.

Bolstered by the large number of Indian tribes they had managed to enlist into their coalition, the Yamasees staged large-scale raids against other colonial settlements in Carolina as well, leading to most colonists abandoning frontier settlements and seeking refuge in Charles Town. South Carolina Governor Charles Craven led a force which defeated the Yamasees at Salkechuh (also spelled Saltketchers or Salkehatchie) on the Combahee River. Eventually, Craven was able to drive the Yamasees across the Savannah River back into Spanish Florida.

After the war, the Yamasees migrated southwards to the region around St. Augustine and Pensacola, where they formed an alliance with the Spanish colonial administration. These Yamasees continued to inhabit Florida until 1727, when the combination of a smallpox epidemic and raids by Col. John Palmer (leading fifty Carolinian militiamen and one hundred Indians) eventually led many of the remaining Yamasees to disperse, with some joining the Seminole or Creek. Still others remained near St. Augustine until the Spanish relinquished control of the city to the British in 1763. A remant group of around ninety Yamasees evacuated Florida and sailed to Havana, Cuba.

== Culture ==
Steven J. Oatis and other historians describe the Yamasees as a multi-ethnic amalgamation of several remnant Indian groups, including the Guale, La Tama, Apalachee, Coweta, and Cussita Creek. Historian Chester B. DePratter describes the Yamasee towns of early South Carolina as consisting of lower towns, consisting mainly of Hitchiti-speaking Indians, and upper towns, consisting mainly of Guale Indians.

=== Slavery ===
The Yamasees were one of the largest slave raiding tribes in the American Southeast during the late 17th century, and have been described as a "militaristic slaving society", having acquired firearms from European colonists. Their use of slave raids to exert dominance over other tribes is partially attributed to the Yamasee aligning with European colonists in order to maintain their own independence. It was typical of Native Americans to take captives during warfare, particularly young women and children, though the Yamasees soon began to transport their captives to Carolina to sell in Charles Town's slave markets. They soon began to conduct raids specifically to take captives and sell them in Carolina.

=== Diplomacy ===
In 1713, Anglican missionaries in South Carolina sponsored the journey of a Yamasees man (whose actual name is unknown, as he was generally referred to as the "prince" or "Prince George") from Charles Town to London. Historians have noted that the motivation of the "prince" to visit London was a form of "religious diplomacy" on the part of the missionaries to further ties between the Yamasee and British colonists. The missionaries hoped that if the "prince" converted to Christianity while in London, it would ensure the Yamasee would become firm allies of the British colonists. Around the period that the "prince" travelled to London, the Yamasees were largely unwilling to be culturally assimilated by the Spanish, choosing to maintain stronger contacts with British colonists instead. The "prince" returned to Charles Town in 1715, right around the period when the Yamasee War broke out, and shortly after his family had been taken captive by Carolinian raiders and sold into slavery.

=== Archaeological research ===
The Yamasee Archeological Project was launched in 1989 to study Yamasee village sites in South Carolina. The project hoped to trace the people's origins and inventory their artifacts. The project located a dozen sites. Pocosabo and Altamaha have since been listed as archeological sites on the National Register of Historic Places.

== Language ==
Yamasee
- Native to: United States
- Region: Georgia
- Ethnicity: Yamasee
- Extinct: 18th century
- Language family: unclassified; perhaps Guale or Muskogean
- Early form: Guale?

Language codes
- ISO 639-3: None (mis)
- Glottolog: yama1265
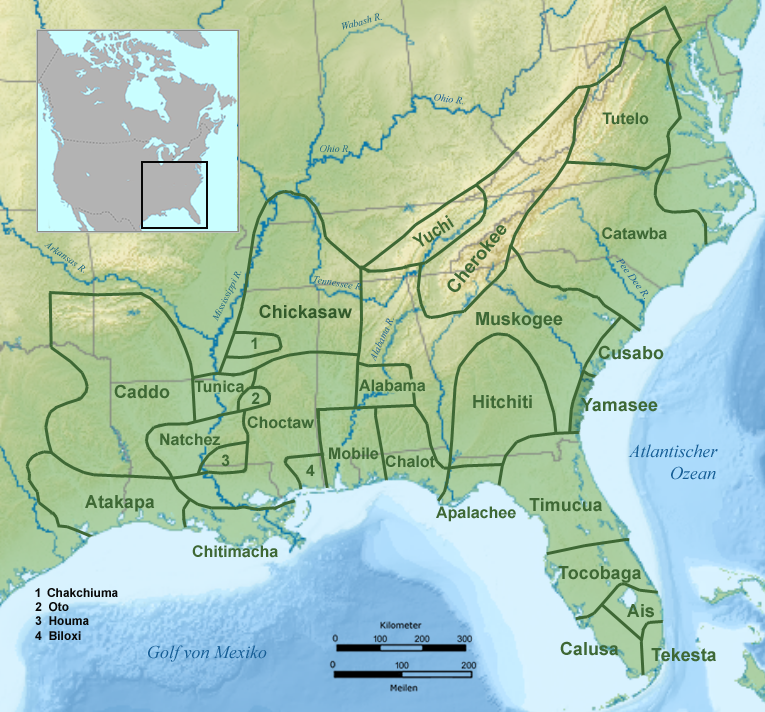
- Tribal territory of the Yamasees during the seventeenth century

The name "Yamasee" perhaps comes from Muskogee yvmvsē, meaning "tame, quiet"; or perhaps from Catawban yį musí:, literally "people-ancient".

Little record remains of the Yamasee language. It is partially preserved in works by missionary Domingo Báez. Diego Peña was told in 1716-1717 that the Cherokee of Tuskegee Town also spoke Yamasee.

Hann (1992) asserted that Yamasee is related to the Muskogean languages. This was based upon a colonial report that a Yamasee spy within a Hitchiti town could understand Hitichiti and was not detected as a Yamasee. Francis Le Jau stated in 1711 that the Yamasee understood Creek. He also noted that many Indians throughout the region used Creek and Shawnee as lingua francas, or common trading languages. In 1716-1717, Diego Peña obtained information that showed that Yamasee and Hitchiti-Mikasuki were considered separate languages.

The Yamasee language, while similar to many Muskogean languages, is especially similar to Creek, for they share many words. Many Spanish missionaries in La Florida were dedicated to learning native languages, such as Yamasee, in an effort to communicate for the purpose of conversion. It also allowed the missionaries to learn about the people's own religion and to find ways to convey Christian ideas to them.

There is limited, inconclusive evidence suggesting the Yamasee language was similar to Guale. It is based on three pieces of information:

- a copy of a 1681 Florida missions census that states that the people of Nuestra Señora de la Candelaria de la Tama speak "la lengua de Guale, y Yamassa" [the Guale and Yamasee language];
- a summary of two 1688 letters, sent by the Spanish Florida governor, that mentions prisoners speaking the "ydioma Yguala y Yamas, de la Prova de Guale" [the Yguala and Yamas language of the province of Guale]; and
- the Guale referred to the Cusabo as Chiluque, which is probably related to the Muscogee word čiló·kki, meaning "Red Moiety."

For this reason, Yamasee and Guale are linked together, sometimes as a single entity.

Linguists note that the Spanish documents are not originals and may have been edited at a later date. The name Chiluque is probably a loanword, as it seems also to have been absorbed into the Timucua language. Thus, the connection of Yamasee with Muskogean is unsupported.

A document in a British colonial archive suggests that the Yamasees originally spoke Cherokee, an Iroquoian language, but had learned another language. For a time they were allied with the Cherokee but are believed to have been a distinct people. In 1715 Col. George Chicken stated that he was told that the Yammasses were the ancient people of the Cherokee.

== Legacy ==
The name of the Yamasees survives in the town of Yemassee, South Carolina, in the Lowcountry close to where the Yamasee War began. It is also used for the title of William Gilmore Simms' 1835 historical novel The Yemassee: A Romance of Carolina, and by extension, Yemassee, the official literary journal of the University of South Carolina.

=== Modern descendants ===
Descendants of the Yamasee are likely represented among citizens of several federally recognized tribes, including the Seminole Nation of Oklahoma, the Seminole Tribe of Florida, and the Miccosukee Tribe of Indians. Following their dispersal, some Yamasee refugees fled south to Florida, where their descendants joined with other tribal groups and remnants through a process of ethnogenesis to become part of the Seminole people. As late as 1775, James Adair recorded “Yamasee” as a dialect still spoken by members of the Catawba Indian Nation in South Carolina.

== Unrecognized organizations ==
There are currently self-identified "Yamasee" groups in Florida, South Carolina, and elsewhere. None of these organizations are federally recognized as Native American tribes.

== See also ==
- Escamacu people
- John Barnwell, Irish colonist
