= Geographical regions of South Carolina =

The geographical regions of South Carolina refers to the three major geographical regions of South Carolina: the Appalachian Mountains in the west, the central Piedmont region, and the eastern Atlantic Coastal Plain. The largest region in the state is the Piedmont, located between the Mountains and the Carolina Sandhills, while the smallest in region in the state is the Mountains, which are part of the Blue Ridge Mountains.

== Blue Ridge Mountains ==
The Mountains of South Carolina refers to the Blue Ridge Mountains, a province of the larger Appalachian Mountains, that stretches from Maine to Alabama. It is the smallest geographical region in the whole state. In South Carolina, this regions consists mostly of igneous and metamorphic rocks of Precambrian age. The highest point in the South Carolina mountains is Sassafras Mountain, at an elevation of around 3,533 ft (1,078 m), which is located on the border with North Carolina. Other major peaks include Pinnacle Mountain, the tallest mountain completely in South Carolina, and Table Rock. The eastern continental divide follows a short section of the South Carolina-North Carolina border.There are several major parks located in this area, including Table Rock State Park, Caesars Head State Park and Jones Gap State Park, which form the Mountain Bridge Wilderness Area, and Oconee State Park. No major cities or towns are located in the mountains, however several small towns are located at the base of the mountains, such as Walhalla, Landrum, and Pickens. Along with the major parks, there are also a few popular tourist attractions, including the Chattooga River, Sumter National Forest, Lake Jocassee and the Cherokee Foothills Scenic Parkway. Further south, Paris Mountain, a monadnock separated from the main part of the Blue Ridge Mountains, is located just north of Greenville and home to Paris Mountain State Park.

== Piedmont ==
The largest region in the state is the Piedmont (United States). In South Carolina, this region consists mostly of igneous and metamorphic rocks of Paleozoic age. The eastern boundary of the Piedmont is the Fall Line. Several cities are located in the Piedmont, such as Greenville, Spartanburg, Rock Hill, and Greenwood. On the eastern boundary of the Piedmont is the Fall Line, which is where the hilly Piedmont abruptly ends at the flat coastal plain. Columbia, the capital of South Carolina, is located where the Broad River, which meets the Saluda River to become the Congaree River, goes over the Fall Line.

== Coastal Plain ==
The Coastal Plain refers the region to the east and south of the Fall Line, and is characterized by sedimentary rocks of Cretaceous and Cenozoic age, as well as younger sediments. The Coastal Plain is a relatively flat and fertile area of land. The Coastal Plain extends from the Fall Line to the Atlantic Ocean. Today the Coastal Plain is home to most of South Carolina's farming and textile industry because of the fertile land. The Coastal plain is home to one of South Carolina's major cities, Charleston.

Myrtle Beach, Hilton Head Island, Florence, and other cities can be found in the Coastal Plains. There are also many barrier islands located in the region, most of which are part of the Sea Islands, which stretch from north of Charleston to northern Florida. The Sea Islands are home to the unique Gullah culture and language, which was formed when slaves from different parts of Africa mixed their cultures and languages.

=== Sandhills ===
The Carolina Sandhills is a 10-35 mi wide physiographic region within the innermost part of the Atlantic Coastal Plain province. The northern extent of the Carolina Sandhills is located near Fayetteville in North Carolina, and the Carolina Sandhills extend south and southwestward into South Carolina and Georgia. The Sandhills is home to Sand Hills State Forest, part of the Congaree River, and the state capital of Columbia. The Carolina Sandhills are interpreted as eolian (wind-blown) sand sheets and dunes that were mobilized episodically from approximately 75,000 to 6,000 years ago. Most of the published luminescence ages from the sand are coincident with the last glaciation, a time when the southeastern United States was characterized by colder air temperatures and stronger winds.
