= Adamson Mounds Site =

Archaeological site in South Carolina, United States

- U.S. National Register of Historic Places
- Nearest city: Camden, South Carolina
- Area: 7.5 acres (3.0 ha)
- NRHP reference No.: 70000591
- Added to NRHP: July 16, 1970

The Adamson Mounds Site (38KE11) is an archaeological site located near Camden, Kershaw County, South Carolina. It is a prehistoric Native American village site containing one large platform mound, a smaller mound, possibly a third still smaller mound, and a burial area. It served as a regional ceremonial center. This site represents a widespread, late prehistoric Mississippian culture known by the names of Lamar, Irene, or Pee Dee and dates probably between AD 1400 and AD 1700.

It was listed on the National Register of Historic Places in 1970.
