= Indian Hill Site (St. Helena Island, South Carolina) =

Archaeological site in South Carolina, United States

- U.S. National Register of Historic Places
- Nearest city: St. Helena Island, South Carolina
- Area: 20 acres (8.1 ha)
- NRHP reference No.: 74001827
- Added to NRHP: March 22, 1974

Archaeological ruins suggest that Indian Hill Site, an "address restricted landmark" in Beaufort County, in the U.S. state of South Carolina, was inhabited between 900 and 1400 AD. The mound that dominates the area is over 13 ft (4.0 m) tall, with a basal diameter of 138 ft (42 m) (east-west), and 129 ft (39 m) (north-south). It is believed that the Indian Hill site served as a regional ceremonial center for religious, social and economic functions. The site was listed in the National Register of Historic Places on March 24, 1974.
