= Wateree =

Wateree may refer to:

- Wateree people, a Native American tribe in the interior of the present-day Carolinas, USA
- Wateree River, a tributary of the Santee River in central South Carolina in the United States
- Wateree, South Carolina, a community in the United States
- Lake Wateree, a reservoir in Kershaw, Fairfield, and Lancaster counties, South Carolina
- USS Wateree, one of three ships that carried the name Wateree
