= Lamar mounds and village site =

Ocmulgee River archaeological site

- Location within U.S. state of Georgia Lamar mounds and village site (the United States)
- 32°48′43.92″N 83°35′31.85″W
- Periods: Lamar phase
- Cultures: South Appalachian Mississippian culture
- Location: Macon, Georgia, Bibb County, Georgia, USA
- Region: Bibb County, Georgia

History
- Built: 1350 CE
- Abandoned: 1600 CE

Site notes
- Architectural styles: platform mound Number of temples: 2
- Ocmulgee National Monument
- U.S. National Register of Historic Places
- U.S. Historic district
- Location: 1207 Emory Hwy., E of Macon, Macon, Georgia
- Area: 702.1 acres (284.1 ha)
- NRHP reference No.: 66000099
- Added to NRHP: October 15, 1966
- Excavation dates: 1934, 1936, 1938, 1939-1940, 1996
- Archaeologists: James A. Ford, Arthur R. Kelly, Gordon Willey, Jesse D. Jennings, Charles Fairbanks, Mark Williams WPA, Lamar Institute

The Lamar mounds and village site (9BI2) is an important archaeological site on the banks of the Ocmulgee River in Bibb County, Georgia (U.S. state), several miles to the southeast of the Ocmulgee mound site. Both mound sites are part of the Ocmulgee Mounds National Historical Park, a national park and historic district created in 1936 and run by the U.S. National Park Service. Historians and archaeologists have theorized that the site is the location of the main village of the Ichisi encountered by the Hernando de Soto expedition in 1539.

== Site description ==
The site has two large platform mounds and an associated village area surrounded by a palisade. The original settlement may have been started on a natural levee of the Ocmulgee River; this is where Mound A was developed. The main village area spreads out to the southeast from this location. This location may have been island-like at the time of its settlement, the only high ground located in a low swampy area, with the Ocmulgee River on one side and an oxbow lake on the other.

Houses in the village were rectangular wattle and daub structures, with some situated on low house mounds. The 3,500-foot-long (1,070 m) palisade was made of upright logs covered in clay. The palisade encircled an area of about 25 acres (0.1 km^{2}) and followed the island shape of the raised levee. Outside the palisade was an encircling ditch, probably water filled at the time of the site's occupation. Mound A is a large mound, around 10 metres (33 ft) in diameter. A 10–15-centimetre (3.9–5.9 in) deep depression is located in the northwestern quadrant of its summit. This feature is thought to be the remnants of a collapsed earth lodge with a dugout floor and embanked walls. Unlike other Middle Mississippian culture platform mounds to the northwest, Lamar-style mounds are more rounded in shape, as compared to squared-off rectangles.

Mound B, completely round in shape, has a feature almost unique in southeastern archaeology: a spiral ramp leading to its summit. This and other evidence has led archaeologists to speculate that the mound was in the process of being enlarged and given a new layer of fill when work was abruptly stopped. Unlike other Mississippian sites, no evidence of a large, flat plaza has been found at the site, although the large area between mounds was once theorized to be one. Two large pits were made at the site, one inside the palisade and the other outside its perimeter. These were probably borrow pits left over from mound construction. It is possible the inhabitants later used the pits as clean water reservoirs and fish ponds, a use described by the De Soto chroniclers when passing through the area.

== Lamar culture ==
The Lamar site was inhabited from about 1350 to 1600 CE, during the late prehistoric and early historic period of the area. The style of Mississippian culture pottery found at the site has been used to define this period in the regional chronology, making it the type site for the Lamar culture (also known variously as the Lamar phase and Lamar period).

== Excavations ==
In 1936 the site was acquired by the United States government and incorporated into the new Ocmulgee National Monument, based on the multiple mounds located to the north at Ocmulgee Mounds. It was extensively excavated during the late 1930s as part of the government's Depression-era Works Progress Administration archaeology program. These excavations started with one directed by James A. Ford in 1934, Arthur R. Kelly in 1936, Gordon Willey in 1938, and in 1939–1940 by Jesse Jennings and Charles Fairbanks. To protect the site from the flooding Ocmulgee River, the government constructed a large levee around the site in 1941.

In 1996 archaeologist Mark Williams from the University of Georgia and the Lamar Institute did test excavations and site mapping. These were the first archaeological explorations at the site since 1940.

== Possible location of Ichisi ==
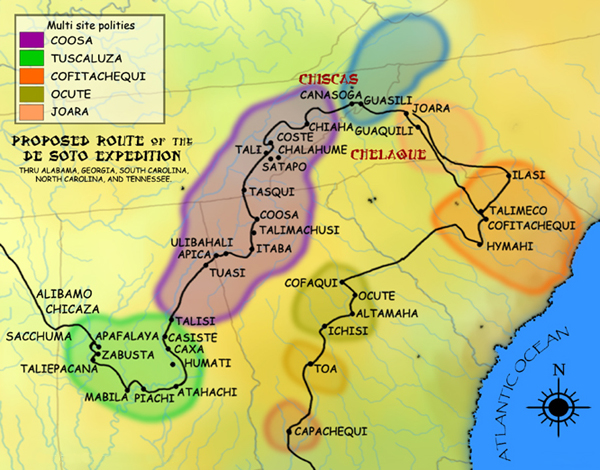
Proposed de Soto expedition route through Georgia (Hudson 1997).

On March 29, 1539, the Hernando de Soto entrada, while winding northward after leaving Florida, recorded coming upon the province of Ichisi, which may have been part of the large Native American country called Ocute. They were greeted at the first village by women dressed in white mantles, offering gifts of corn cakes and wild onions. On March 30 they were ferried across the Ocmulgee River in dugout canoes and met the leader of the country, who they noted had only one good eye. The Spanish expedition spent several days at the village as guests of this chief. He gave de Soto gifts of food, and offered him porters and translators to assist him in getting to the next chiefdom to the northeast, Ocute. This people were recorded as speaking a different language than the Ichisi. Before leaving on April 1, the Spaniards erected a large wooden cross atop one of the village platform mounds and tried to explain its significance to the villagers.

Noted historian and de Soto researcher Charles M. Hudson theorized in the 1980s and 90s, that the de Soto entrada crossed the Ocmulgee River near the future site of Macon, Georgia, and that the Lamar Mounds may have been the location of the capital of the Ocute. This view has been supported by archaeologists who have worked at the site.

But archaeological work in 2009 at a site in rural Telfair County, Georgia, near the present-day town of McRae, discovered evidence that calls this identification into question. Evidence from the Telfair site suggests that de Soto's crossing of the Ocmulgee River took place here, approximately 90 miles (140 km) further south than at Lamar Mounds. Archaeologists and historians are still debating which of the two sites was visited by de Soto and his men.

== Lamar name ==
The mounds are located on plantation land that was owned by John Basil Lamar in the antebellum period. After his death during the Civil War, the Lamar family retained the property. They sold that part of the former plantation that includes the mounds to the United States in 1936.

== See also ==
- Coosa chiefdom
- Etowah Indian Mounds
- List of Mississippian sites
- List of sites and peoples visited by the Hernando de Soto Expedition
