= Tugaloo =

19th century Cherokee village in northeast Georgia

Coordinates: 34°37′N 83°14′W

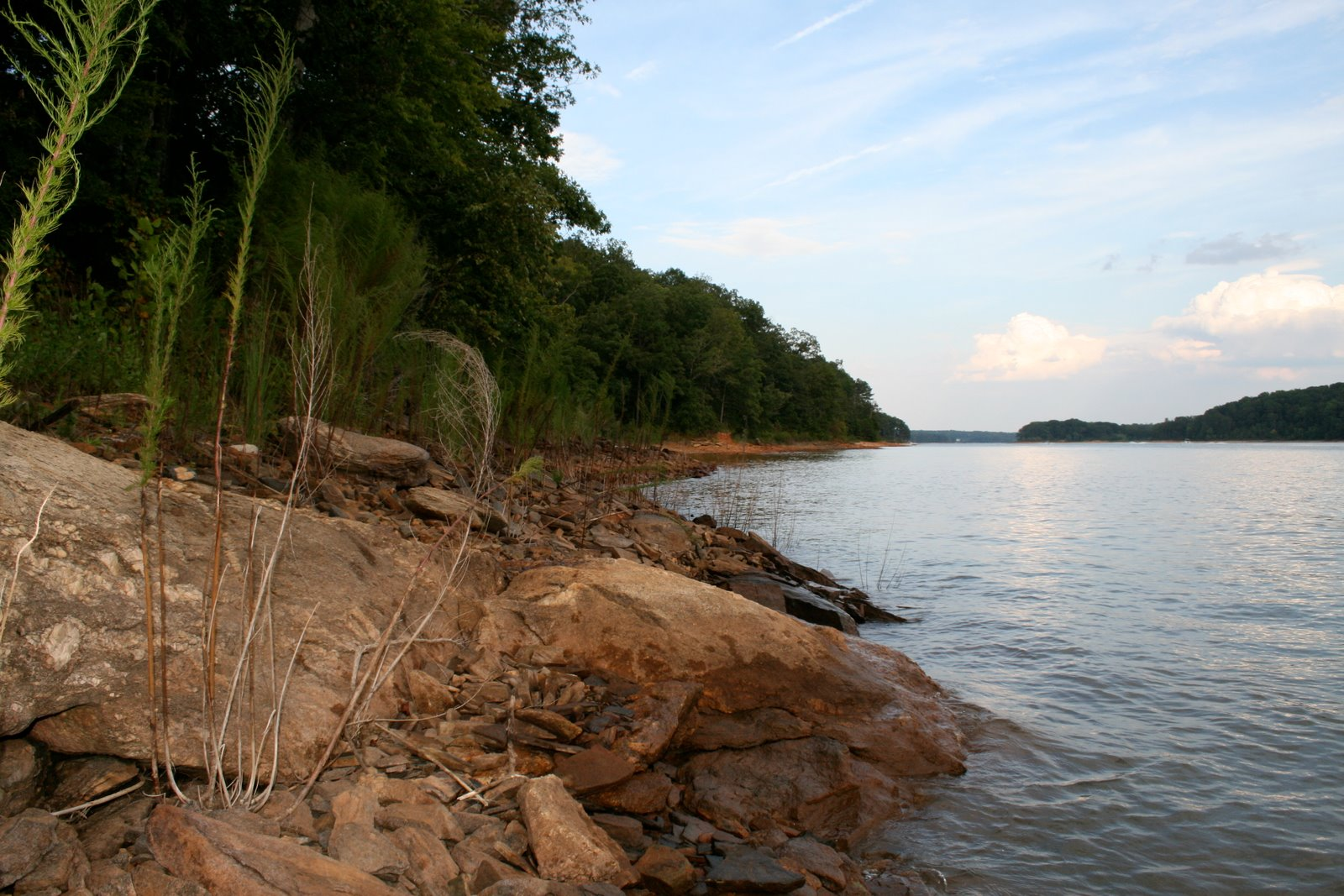
Bank of the Tugaloo River adjacent to the Tugaloo State Park campground, near the site of Tugaloo village (now beneath the impoundment of Lake Hartwell)

Tugaloo (Dugiluyi (ᏚᎩᎷᏱ)) was a Cherokee town located on the Tugaloo River, at the mouth of Toccoa Creek. It was south of Toccoa and Travelers Rest State Historic Site in present-day Stephens County, Georgia, United States. Cultures of ancient indigenous peoples had occupied this area, and those of the South Appalachian Mississippian culture built a platform mound and village here. It was an administrative and ceremonial center for them.

About six miles upriver was Estatoe, another historic Cherokee town in this area. (Other historic towns named Estatoe were identified in both western South Carolina and North Carolina.) Both the historic and prehistoric sites of Estatoe and Tugaloo were inundated by the creation of Lake Hartwell above Hartwell Dam.

== Etymology ==
Tugaloo's proper name in Cherokee was Dugiluyi (ᏚᎩᎷᏱ); abbreviated to Dugilu (ᏚᎩᎷ). In English, it was phonetically spelled variously as Tugalo, Tugaloo, Toogelah, Toogoola, etc. Its meaning in Cherokee is uncertain, but seems to refer to a "place at the forks of a stream."

== History ==
=== Early eighteenth century ===
Tugaloo was classified as one of the Cherokee "Lower Towns", located in southwestern South Carolina and northeastern Georgia. The principal one of this grouping was Keowee. The terms "Lower Towns" and "Lower Cherokee" were geographic classifications by English traders and colonists, referring to the Cherokee who lived along the Keowee River, Tugaloo River, and other head streams of the Savannah River in the Piedmont and foothills of the region defined above. These communities of Cherokee spoke the Eastern Dialect of Cherokee. Tugaloo may have previously been associated with Ocute.

In 1715 Gen. James Moore ordered an expedition into the Cherokee Lower Towns. The expedition, led by Col. Maurice Moore, left Fort Moore and arrived at Tugaloo on December 29, 1715. The expedition left Tugaloo on New Year's Day, 1716, for Nacoochee, and passed through Toccoa. Indian agent George Chicken was part of the expedition, and described Tugaloo as "the most ancient town in these parts." Col. Chicken convinced the Cherokee leaders to fight against the Savanna, Yuchi, and Apalachee peoples as allies of the English.

The Cherokee killed eleven Lower Creek ambassadors at Tugaloo, bringing them into additional conflict with the Lower Creek, with whom they had been competing also in Tennessee and what is now Stephens County, Georgia. This became known as the Tugaloo Massacre during the Yamasee War in 1716. By 1717, Theophilus Hastings operated a trading center among the Creek at Tugaloo.

At the time of James Adair's publishing of his magnum opus, The History of the American Indians, in 1775, the Cherokee towns of Ishtatohe (Estatoe) and Toogalo (Tugaloo) along the head waters of the Savannah River were already either forsaken or destroyed because of the incessant wars. After the United States gained independence in the American Revolutionary War, General Joseph Martin, U.S. Special Agent to the Cherokee and Chickasaw, visited the once-famous site of Tugaloo town in 1788. From there he wrote a letter to Creek leader Alexander McGillivray. Martin sent McGillivray the resolutions of Congress pertaining to Cherokee affairs, and expressed a desire for tensions between the United States and the Creek Nation to end. He asked for McGillivray's assistance in recovering horses that were purportedly stolen from his force by Creek raiders. He also asked McGillivray to allow several hundred European-American families to settle in the Tombigbee area, which was controlled by the Muscogee Creek.

The letter was intercepted, and when it was discovered, the North Carolina General Assembly launched an investigation into Martin's conduct. He was exonerated after it was revealed that he was acting as a spy directed by Patrick Henry to discern McGillivray's ties to the Spanish, who were active in neighboring Spanish Florida.

=== Later events ===
In 1798, Superintendent Benjamin Hawkins, in charge of Southeastern regional Native American relations, used Tugaloo town as one of the landmarks for the boundary between the state of Georgia and Muscogee Creek territory.

After Indian Removal in the late 1830s of the Cherokee and Creek peoples, European Americans took over these lands. They expanded cotton plantations throughout the uplands, and used much of the area or agriculture well into the twentieth century.

=== 20th century to present ===
In 1959 the areas of Tugaloo and the nearby Estatoe village, believed to have been about 6 miles north on the west side of the Tugaloo River, were excavated and studied by an archaeological team led by the University of Georgia. (Note: There were other Cherokee villages named Estatoe in both South Carolina and North Carolina.)

The University of Georgia team was conducting a salvage study prior to flooding of both sites by a reservoir after completion of Hartwell Dam on the Savannah River, and related dams on upper tributaries. They were seeking to use excavation and collection of artifacts to gather as much information as possible about these sites. The creation of Lake Hartwell above the dam would inundate these ancient sites.

The Tugaloo Bend Heritage Park was established near Yonah Dam and what is believed to have been the ancient site of Estatoe. A historic preserve of 87 acres was established here. During much of the nineteenth and twentieth centuries, after the Cherokee had been removed from the Southeast and forced to Indian Territory, this property was farmed for agriculture.

The park is at the northern end of the roughly 10-mile long Historic Tugaloo River Corridor, which extends downriver to the upper reaches of Lake Hartwell. Sites marked along this corridor include early frontier and antebellum properties, in addition to Cherokee sites. It reaches to the former site of Tugaloo mound and village.
