= 2025 in North Carolina =

- Decades: 2000s; 2010s; 2020s
- See also: History of North Carolina; Historical outline of North Carolina; List of years in North Carolina; 2025 in the United States

The following is a list of events of the year 2025 in North Carolina.

== Incumbents ==
=== State government ===
- Governor: Josh Stein (D)

== Events ==
=== January ===
- January 26 – John Nigh prison escape

=== February ===
- February 10 – Jeanette W. Hyde, American diplomat and former United States Ambassador died in Raleigh.

=== March ===
- March 2 – North Carolina is impacted by the 2025 Southeastern United States wildfires.

=== April ===
- April 25 – St. Andrews University in Laurinburg announces it will be closing.
- April 27 – One person is killed and six others, including three students, are wounded in a school shooting during a university event at the historically black Elizabeth City State University in Elizabeth City.

=== May ===
- May 25 – North Carolina beats Northwestern 12–8 to win the 2025 NCAA Division I women's lacrosse tournament.

=== July ===
- July 7:
  - Remnants of Tropical Storm Chantal cause flooding in central North Carolina. An 83-year-old woman is killed when her car is swept off the road in Chatham County.
  - A small plane crashes near Sanford, killing four family members flying from Florida.
- July 26 – Six people are killed and another is injured in a traffic accident on Interstate 485 in Charlotte.
- July 29 – The Trump administration freezes $108 million for the Duke University Health System, accusing Duke University of racial discrimination.

=== August ===
- August 3–August 10 – 2025 Little League Softball World Series in Greenville
- August 22 – Ukrainian refugee Iryna Zarutska is fatally stabbed in a Lynx streetcar in Charlotte. A 34-year-old man with a criminal record is arrested.

=== September ===
- September 16 – Elon University and Queens University of Charlotte announce they will be merging by August 2026.
- September 18 – Three people, including country musician Brett James, are killed in a plane crash near Franklin.
- September 27 – Three people are killed and five others injured in a mass shooting at a dockside restaurant in Southport. The suspected shooter, who arrived and fled by boat, is taken into custody by the United States Coast Guard.

=== October ===
- October 8 – State Representative Cecil Brockman (D-High Point) is arrested and charged with statutory sexual offense with a child and taking indecent liberties with a child.
- October 22 – The State House approves a new congressional map designed to give Republicans an extra seat in the House.

=== November ===
- November 4
  - 2025 Charlotte mayoral election: Incumbent Mayor Vi Lyles wins reelection over Republican Terrie Donovan.
  - 2025 Durham mayoral election: Incumbent Mayor Leonardo Williams wins reelection.
  - 2025 Fayetteville, North Carolina mayoral election: Incumbent Mayor Mitch Colvin is reelected to a fifth term.
  - 2025 Greensboro mayoral election: City Councilmember Marikay Abuzuaiter is elected to become mayor of Greensboro.
- November 15 – The Department of Homeland Security begins a surge of immigration enforcement in Charlotte.
- November 18 – The immigration crackdown spreads to the Raleigh metro area.

=== December ===
- December 15 – An explosion at a house in Salisbury injures 13 people, including 11 firefighters.
- December 18
  - A Cessna C550 plane crashes while landing at Statesville Regional Airport, killing seven people. NASCAR driver Greg Biffle and his family are among the deceased.
  - President Trump signs a bill that formally recognizes the Lumbee Tribe of North Carolina.

== See also ==
- 2025 in the United States
- History of North Carolina
