= 2026 in North Carolina =

- Decades: 2000s; 2010s; 2020s
- See also: History of North Carolina; Historical outline of North Carolina; List of years in North Carolina; 2026 in the United States

The following is a list of events of the year 2026 in North Carolina.

== Incumbents ==
=== State government ===
- Governor: Josh Stein (D)

== Events ==
=== January ===
- January 6 – 2025–26 United States measles outbreak: Three measles cases are reported in Buncombe County, with the health department tracing the origin to a Mission Health emergency department in Asheville.
- January 21 – 18-year-old Austin Thompson, who killed five people in a series of shootings in Raleigh in 2022, pleads guilty to murder.

=== February ===
- February 21 - Austin Tucker Martin, a 21-year-old man from Cameron, is reported missing from his home in Moore County. The following morning, he is shot and killed by Secret Service agents outside Mar-a-Lago.

=== March ===
- March 3 – Primary elections are held for congress races.
- March 28 – The ARCA races at Hickory are held at the Hickory Motor Speedway for the first time.

=== April ===
- April 2 – The North Carolina Supreme Court dismisses with prejudice a case challenging public school funding.
- April 10 – The Greensboro Swarm beat the Stockton Kings 119–104 in game 2 of the 2026 NBA G League playoffs, their first title.

=== May ===
- May 22 – Two attorneys are shot outside a courthouse in Raleigh. The attorneys were representing the city of Rolesville in a civil suit filed by the same woman accused of shooting them.

=== June ===
- June 14 – The Carolina Hurricanes beat the Vegas Golden Knights 3–0 in game six of the 2026 Stanley Cup playoffs to win the series 4–2. It is the Hurricanes's second title.
- June 29 – Inmates take over part of the Bertie-Martin Regional Detention Center in Windsor. Two of the three guards on duty are taken hostage, but they are released alongside 80 of the 88 total inmates. Hours later, authorities enter and seize control of the jail.

=== August ===
- August 2–9 – The 2026 Little League Softball World Series is held in Greenville. The team from Johnston County, North Carolina wins.
- August 6 – The Trump administration sues Duke University, accusing it of discriminating against White and Asian applicants to its law school.

=== September ===
- September 1 – The House of Representatives votes to censure Chuck Edwards following an investigation regarding his behavior towards female staffers.
- September 18 – A judge rules that Tailei Qi, a University of North Carolina at Chapel Hill graduate student who killed Professor Zijie Yan on the UNC campus in 2023, was legally insane during the shooting. The judge dismisses charges against Qi and orders he be involuntarily committed.

=== October ===
- October 26 – Jonathan Miller, a Libertarian candidate for North Carolina State Senate, is arrested following a standoff with police in Cary.

=== November ===
- November 3 – 2026 North Carolina elections:
  - 2026 North Carolina Senate election
  - 2026 North Carolina House of Representatives election
  - 2026 North Carolina judicial elections
  - 2026 United States House of Representatives elections in North Carolina
  - 2026 United States Senate election in North Carolina: Former governor Roy Cooper wins the election, beating former Republican National Committee chair Michael Whatley.
  - 2026 Wake County District Attorney election
  - 2026 Wake County elections
- November 14 – Charlotte Independence wins the USL League One championship, beating Athletic Club Boise 4–2.

== See also ==
- 2026 in the United States
- History of North Carolina
