= Black Christmas =

Black Christmas may refer to:

- Black Christmas (1974 film), a Canadian horror film
  - Black Christmas (2006 film), the first remake of the 1974 film
  - Black Christmas (2019 film), the second remake of the 1974 film
- Black Christmas boycott, a 1963 economic boycott of businesses in Greenville, North Carolina
- Black Christmas (2001), a series of bushfires in the Australian state of New South Wales that began on Christmas Eve, 2001
- Black Christmas (Hong Kong), the surrender after the Battle of Hong Kong in 1941

== See also ==
- Dark Christmas (disambiguation)
