= 2023 in North Carolina =

- Decades: 2000s; 2010s; 2020s
- See also: History of North Carolina; Historical outline of North Carolina; List of years in North Carolina; 2023 in the United States

The following is a list of events of the year 2023 in North Carolina.

== Incumbents ==
=== State government ===
- Governor: Roy Cooper (D)

== Events ==
- May 18 – A five-alarm fire in SouthPark, Charlotte engulfs and collapses two large buildings under construction, killing two construction workers. Emergency personnel rescue fifteen other workers, one of whom is later hospitalized.
- June 2 – The U.S. Army base at Fort Bragg, named after Confederate General Braxton Bragg, is renamed Fort Liberty.
- September 23 – Tropical Storm Ophelia makes landfall near Emerald Isle.

== See also ==
- 2023 in the United States
