= 2024 in North Carolina =

- Decades: 2000s; 2010s; 2020s
- See also: History of North Carolina; Historical outline of North Carolina; List of years in North Carolina; 2024 in the United States

The following is a list of events of the year 2024 in North Carolina.

== Incumbents ==
=== State government ===
- Governor: Roy Cooper (D)

== Events ==
- March 5 – Super Tuesday:
  - The Democratic Party holds presidential nominating contests in North Carolina.
  - The Republican Party holds presidential nominating contests in North Carolina.
- April 29 – 2024 Charlotte shootout: Four law enforcement officers and suspect are killed and four others are injured in a shootout in Charlotte.
- May 1 – Federal judge Catherine Eagles blocks several of North Carolina's restrictions on the abortion pill mifepristone, striking down a requirement that the drug can only be prescribed by doctors in-person, as well as a requirement for patients to have an in-person follow-up appointment.
- September 27 – Hurricane Helene: The Emergency Management department of Rutherford County, issues a warning for the "imminent" failure of the Lake Lure Dam due to significant rainfall, and orders immediate evacuations.
- September 29 – The death toll from Hurricane Helene rises to 46 in North Carolina.
- October 1 – The death toll from Hurricane Helene surpasses 160 people, with most of the deaths occurring in North Carolina, making it the second-deadliest hurricane to strike the contiguous United States in the past fifty years, behind only Hurricane Katrina.
- October 3 – Effects of Hurricane Helene in North Carolina: A thousand U.S. soldiers are deployed to western North Carolina — where over half of the 190 reported storm victims in the United States were located — to aid the North Carolina National Guard in humanitarian operations and in finding hundreds of missing residents.
- December 23 - An off-duty police officer from Greensboro is shot and killed after a shooting in a Food Lion grocery store.

== See also ==
- 2024 in the United States
- Effects of Hurricane Helene in North Carolina
