= Dark Christmas =

Dark Christmas may refer to:

- Dark Christmas (Abney Park album)
- Dark Christmas (Tarja album)

== See also ==
- Black Christmas (disambiguation)
