= John Nigh prison escape =

2025 jail escape in Craven County, North Carolina, U.S.

John Nigh jail escape
- Location of Craven County within the U.S. state of North Carolina
- Date: January 26, 2025 - February 11, 2025 (16 days)
- Location: Craven County Jail, New Bern, North Carolina, U.S.; 35.13°N 77.18°W
- Type: Jail escape, manhunt
- Participants: 3 (including two unnamed cellmates who assisted Nigh)
- Charges: Resisting arrest (Craven and Onslow counties); 3 counts of assault on a law enforcement officer (Craven County); 3 counts of attempted murder on a law enforcement officer (Onslow County); 3 counts of assault on a law enforcement officer (Onslow County); Larceny (Pamlico County); Burglary (Pamlico County); Motor vehicle theft (Pamlico County)
- Nigh has been charged with multiple crimes in three North Carolina counties; Craven, Onslow, and Pamlico; Nigh was awaiting trial for 3 counts of attempted murder at the Craven County Jail

The jail escape of John Nigh took place on January 26, 2025, when Nigh, who was awaiting trial for attempted murder charges, escaped the Craven County Jail in New Bern, North Carolina, United States. Nigh was assisted in his escape by two cellmates, who removed a ceiling grating in the cell and stuffed Nigh's mattress, to make it appear to correctional officers that he was asleep. Later that day, jail staff noticed his absence, and a manhunt ensued immediately afterward. On February 11, sixteen days after his escape, he was located and arrested in neighboring Pamlico County.

== Escape ==
Nigh escaped from his cell on January 26, 2025. At approximately 4:00 PM that day, jail staff noticed his escape and authorities were notified. His two cellmates were charged with aiding and abetting in the escape.

== Manhunt ==
The manhunt for Nigh continued for sixteen days. Law enforcement agencies in the North Carolina counties of Carteret, Craven, Lenoir, Martin, Nash, Onslow, Pamlico, and Pitt assisted in the search. The United States Marshals Service also assisted in search efforts.

== Charges ==
John Nigh has been charged with multiple crimes in three North Carolina counties; Craven, Onslow, and Pamlico.

=== Craven County ===
- Resisting arrest
- Three counts of assault on a law enforcement officer

=== Onslow County ===
- Resisting arrest
- Three counts of attempted murder on a law enforcement officer
- Three counts of assault on a law enforcement officer

=== Pamlico County ===
- Burglary
- Larceny
- Motor vehicle theft
