= Black Christmas boycott =

1963 event

The Black Christmas Boycott, also known as the Christmas Sacrifice, in Greenville, North Carolina was a non-violent demonstration of the Civil Rights Movement in 1963 during the months of November and December.

The implementation of Jim Crow laws and the customs of racial segregation resulted in a lack of jobs for the members of the black community of Greenville; most businesses refused to hire black Americans during the holiday season. Following Dr. Martin Luther King’s practice of non-violence, the black community of Greenville organized a boycott of Christmas products, targeting downtown businesses that engaged in racially discriminatory hiring practices. They tried to avoid buying products such as Christmas gifts, lights, decorations, and specialty foods. Later, they settled on a Christmas blackout as another form of silent protest.

== Background ==
Black Christmas movements were one of many forms of non-violent protests of the Civil Rights Movement. In 1960, in concurrence with the Montgomery bus boycotts, Dr. Martin Luther King Jr. encouraged protestors to abstain from Christmas shopping. In addition, the Student Nonviolent Coordinating Committee organized and coordinated a national Christmas boycott against stores that enforced segregation in their facilities in December of 1960. The utilization of boycotts that targeted discriminatory business continued into the years that followed. Medgar Evers, the first and leading field officer of the Jackson, Mississippi branch of the National Association for the Advancement of Colored People, directed a boycott against local stores to promote desegregation and civil rights spanning from early December of 1962 to several months later.

== Black Christmas movements 1963 ==
=== Call for Unity ===
The movements were employed again in late 1963, following the assassination of John F. Kennedy, the 16th Street Baptist Church bombing, and assassination of Medgar Evers. Moved by the 16th Street Baptist Church bombing that left four young girls dead, James Baldwin, black American writer and activist, spoke to a crowd at the New York Community Church in September 1963. He called for a “massive civil disobedience campaign” to encourage Americans, no matter their color, to use their economic power to protest the violence and local terrorism against Black people across the nation. The campaign did not have great success, with several of the major civil rights organizations choosing not to sponsor the movement. The Southern Christian Leadership Conference were the only civil rights organization that showed support for the movement. Despite a lack of unity nationwide for the moment, many cities chose to participate.

=== Greenville, North Carolina ===
In the city of Greenville, North Carolina, the local Black community, more than a third of their population, held what was known as the “Christmas Sacrifice,” a demonstration inspired by its preceding events. Initially, the Progressive Citizens Council designed the demonstration to be a boycott of the downtown business. A lack of consensus between the Interracial Committee and the Progressive Citizens Council caused the boycott to be amended into a blackout of Christmas tree lights. According to the North Carolina Mayor's Co-operating Committee, “The blackout was very successful…the experience gave the Negro a sense of unity that he has generally lacked.

"The only organized demonstration by local African Americans, until 1963, was the “Christmas Sacrifice.” It involved a blackout of Christmas tree lights as a form of silent protest to racial prejudice. Only six African American houses in Greenville reportedly burned Christmas tree lights during the holidays that year."

The next year, 1964, saw a large increase in Greenville with the hiring of black employees for the Christmas season.
