= History of North Carolina =

The history of North Carolina from pre-colonial history to the present, covers the experiences of the people who have lived within the territory that now comprises the U.S. state of North Carolina.

Findings of the earliest discovered human settlements in present day North Carolina, are found at the Hardaway Site, dating back to approximately 8000 BCE. From around 1000 BCE, until the time of European contact, is the time period known as the Woodland period. It was during this time period, that the Mississippian period began, which included areas of North Carolina. Historically documented tribes in the North Carolina region include the Algonquian peoplesof the coastal areas, such as the Chowanoke, Roanoke, Pamlico and Machapunga – they were the first encountered by English colonists. Other tribes including Iroquoian peoples such as Meherrin, Cherokee, and Tuscarora in the interior part of the state. There were many other tribes, such as the Cheraw, Yuchi, Waxhaw, Saponi, Waccamaw, and Catawba, Coree and Cape Fear Indians.

The earliest English attempt at colonization was the Roanoke Colony in 1585, the famed "Lost Colony" of Sir Walter Raleigh. The Province of Carolina was formed in 1629, and became an official province in 1663. It split in 1712, helping form the Province of North Carolina. North Carolina is named after King Charles I of England; it became a royal colony of the British Empire in 1729. In 1776, the colony declared independence. The Halifax Resolves resolution adopted by North Carolina on April 12, 1776, was the first formal call for independence from Great Britain among the American Colonies during the American Revolution. On November 21, 1789, North Carolina became the 12th state to ratify the United States Constitution.

From colonial times, through the American Civil War, the enslavement of humans was legal in North Carolina. Tensions on rights of slave owners was the main cause of the American Civil War. North Carolina declared its secession from the Union on May 20, 1861. Following the Civil War, North Carolina was restored to the Union on July 4, 1868. The Thirteenth Amendment to the United States Constitution was ratified December of 1865, ending the chattel slavery. After the Reconstruction era, white Democrats regained control of the state's political system. In the 1890s, white Democrats passed Jim Crow laws hindering many poor whites from voting and effectively disfranchised African Americans from voting. Jim Crow laws also enforced racial segregation. These laws were enforced until federal legislation was passed in the 1960s.

On December 17, 1903, Orville and Wilbur Wright successfully piloted the world's first powered heavier-than-air aircraft in the Outer Banks of North Carolina. During the late 19th and early 20th century, North Carolina started its shift from an agricultural based economy, to industrialization, adding many more new job occupations throughout the state. Many tobacco and textile mills started to form around this time in the Piedmont region between the Atlantic coastal plain and the Blue Ridge Mountains. Also the furniture industry flourished. The Great Depression in the 1930s hit the state's economy hard. New Deal projects helped the state recover. World War II had a major impact speeding up the industrialization and modernization. economic diversification after 1945 stimulated growth.

Research Triangle Park, the largest research park in the United States, was established in 1959 near Raleigh, Durham, and Chapel Hill. During the Civil Rights Movement, the Greensboro sit-ins led by African American students, lead to Greensboro businesses desegregating their lunch counters. This movement also spread to many other cities in America, helping end racial segregation policies. During the 1960s, Congressional passage of the Civil Rights Act of 1964 and Voting Rights Act of 1965 enabled African Americans to have a voice in society and political life.

By the late 20th century, industries such as technology, pharmaceuticals, banking, food processing, and vehicle parts started to emerge as main economic drivers within the state, a shift from the states former main industries of tobacco, textiles, and furniture. The main factors in this shift were globalization, the state's higher education system, national banking, the transformation of agriculture, and new companies moving to the state. During the 1990s, Charlotte became a major national banking center. Through the late 20th century and into the 21st century, North Carolina's metropolitan areas continued to grow. This led to many migrants coming to North Carolina from both within the United States and internationally.

== Pre-colonial history ==
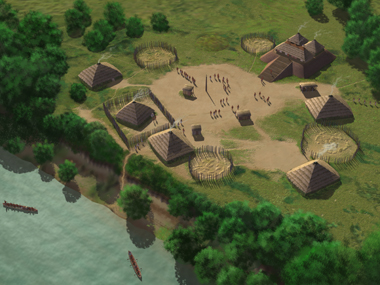
Artists conception of Town Creek Indian Mound during the late Town Creek-early Leak phases circa 1350 CE

The earliest discovered human settlements in what eventually became North Carolina are found at the Hardaway Site near the town of Badin in the south-central part of the state. Radiocarbon dating of the site has not been possible. But, based on other dating methods, such as rock strata and the existence of Dalton-type spear points, the site has been dated to approximately 8000 BCE, or 10,000 years old.

Spearpoints of the Dalton type continued to change and evolve slowly for the next 7,000 years, suggesting a continuity of culture for most of that time. During this time, the settlement was scattered and likely existed solely on the hunter-gatherer level. Toward the end of this period, there is evidence of settled agriculture, such as plant domestication and the development of pottery.

From 1000 BCE until the time of European settlement, the time period is known as the "Woodland period". Permanent villages, based on settled agriculture, were developed throughout the present-day state. By about 800 CE, towns were fortified throughout the Piedmont region, suggesting the existence of organized tribal warfare. An important site of this late-Woodland period is the Town Creek Indian Mound, an archaeologically rich site occupied from about 1100 to 1450 CE by the Pee Dee people of the South Appalachian Mississippian culture.

=== The Native Peoples of North Carolina ===
North Carolina was home to many distinct nations. Along the east coast were the Algonquian Chowanoke, Roanoke, and Croatan nations. The Chowanoke lived north of the Neuse River and the Croatan south of it. They had (along with the Powhatan, Piscataway & Nanticoke further north) adopted a governing system by which they would be governed by a Weroance and their council of advisors who formed a council with him to discuss political affairs. The Chowanoke were protected by English colonists in the late 17th century, but dissolved completely in the 19th century. As the Powhatan Confederacy started to dissolve due to encroaching settlers, some tribes like the Machapunga, broke away and migrated south to live among the Chowanoke.

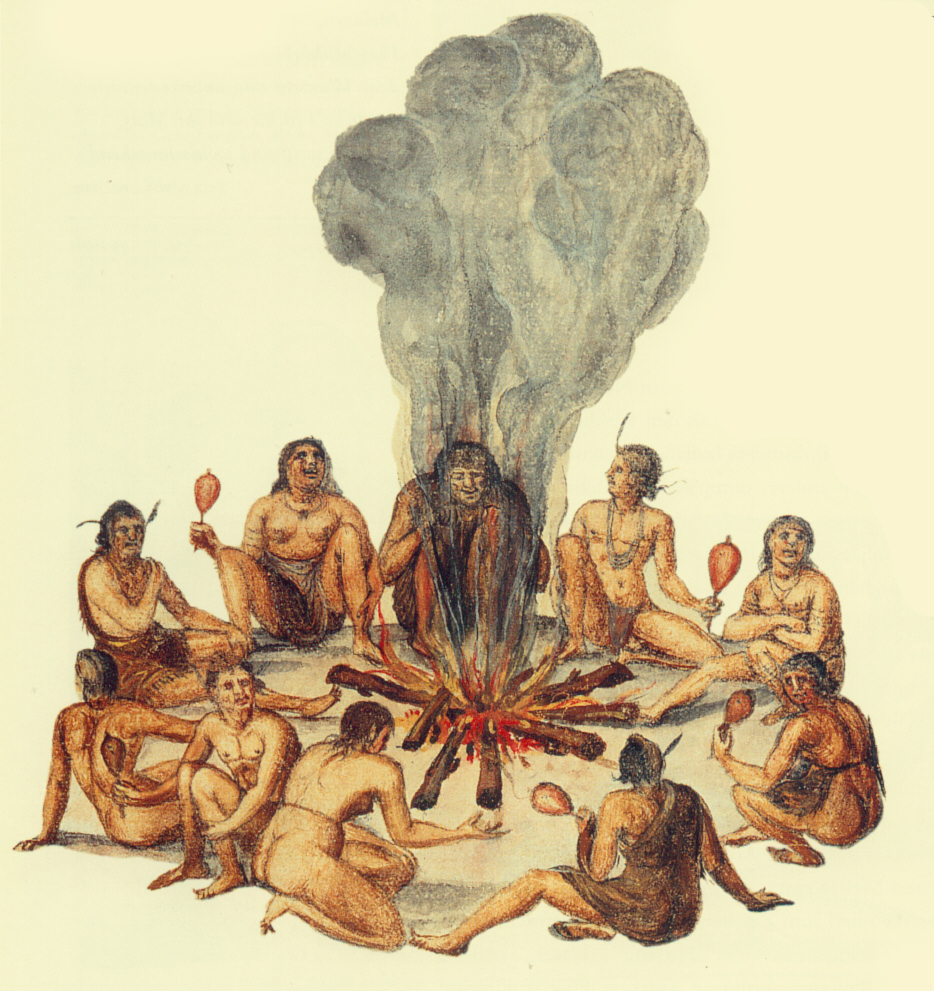
Ceremony of Secotan warriors in North Carolina. Watercolour by English colonist John White, 1585

Inland of them were many more tribes called the Catawba, the Waccamaw, the Cheraw, the Winyah, the Wateree and the Sugaree. It's difficult to say just how many existed in the region. Between 1680 and 1701, the region also played host to the Saponi, Tutelo, Occaneechi Keyauwee, Shakori and Sissipahaw (possibly among others), who had been driven out of the state by an invasion of the Haudenosaunee. Most of all other tribes of the Carolinas slowly merged and were adopted in the Catawba Confederacy by the American Revolution. In the 19th century, the Catawba moved west and were consolidated with the Cherokee, despite keeping their own traditions alive long term. It is also important to note that many tribes joined the Muscogee Confederacy beyond the Santee River. The northernmost known tribe such as this—the Pedee—lived in south-central North Carolina.

The first Spanish and English explorers appear to have greatly overestimated the size of the Cherokee, placing them as far north as Virginia. However, many historians now believe that there was a large confederacy in the region, called the Coosa. Spanish explorers also gave them the nicknames Chalaques & Uchis during the 16th century, and English colonists turned Chalaques into Cherokees. The Cherokees we know today were among these people, but lived much further south and both the Cherokee language and the Yuchi language carry many loan words from their neighbors. This nation would have existed throughout parts of the states of Virginia, Kentucky, Tennessee, North & South Carolina & Georgia, with cores of different culture groups organized at different extremes of the territory &, probably, speaking Yuchi as a common tongue.

Two other tribes must be noted here. Between 1655 and 1680, a tribe known as the Westo arrived in the region. It is now believed that they were the remainder of the Erie and Neutral confederacies who had been pushed out of Ohio during the Beaver Wars. They arrived in West Virginia, driving the Tutelo east to live near the Saponi, then punched straight south, through the Chalaques, settled somewhere around the Yadkin River and began preying on the smaller tribes of the region. After they were defeated by a coalition led by the "Sawannos," much of the land in North Carolina was reclaimed by its former owners. However, other tribes from further south filed north into the southern reaches of this area and reformatted themselves to create the Yamasee Nation.

In further reference to the Chalaques, after the Westo punched straight through them, they seem to have split along the line of the Tennessee River to create the Cherokee to the south and the Yuchi to the north. Then, following the Yamasee War (1715–1717), the Yuchi were forced across Appalachia and split again, into the Coyaha and the Chisca. The French, seeing an opportunity for new allies, ingratiated themselves with the Chisca and had them relocated to the heart of the Illinois Colony to live among the Ilinoweg. Later, as French influence along the Ohio River waned, the tribe seems to have split away again, taking many Ilinoweg tribes with them, and moved back to Kentucky, where they became the Kispoko. The Kispoko later became the fourth tribe of Shawnee.

Meanwhile, the Coyaha reforged their alliance with the Cherokee and brought in many of the smaller tribes in Alabama, to form the Creek Confederacy. The Creeks would go on to conquer the Yamasee of the east coast, as well as the Calusa nation of southern Florida. They then spread out, splitting into the Upper, Middle & Lower Creeks—best known today as the Muscogee, Cherokee, and Seminole Nations.

Although broken and abandoned by the English colonists they were formerly allied to, the Yamasee people survived as backwater nomads throughout a vast territory between South Carolina and Florida. Many Yamasee tribes have since reformed in modern times.

Later, the Meherrin migrated south from Virginia and settled on a reservation in northeast North Carolina. Due to early maps, the Nottoway may have also existed more on the Virginia-North Carolina border before migrating a little more northwest. They are noted as the Mangoag on a map by John Smith from 1606. Following the Meherrin were a small group of Tuscaroras, who remained in the region after the Tuscarora War, and sent most of their people north to live among the Iroquois.

== Earliest European explorations ==
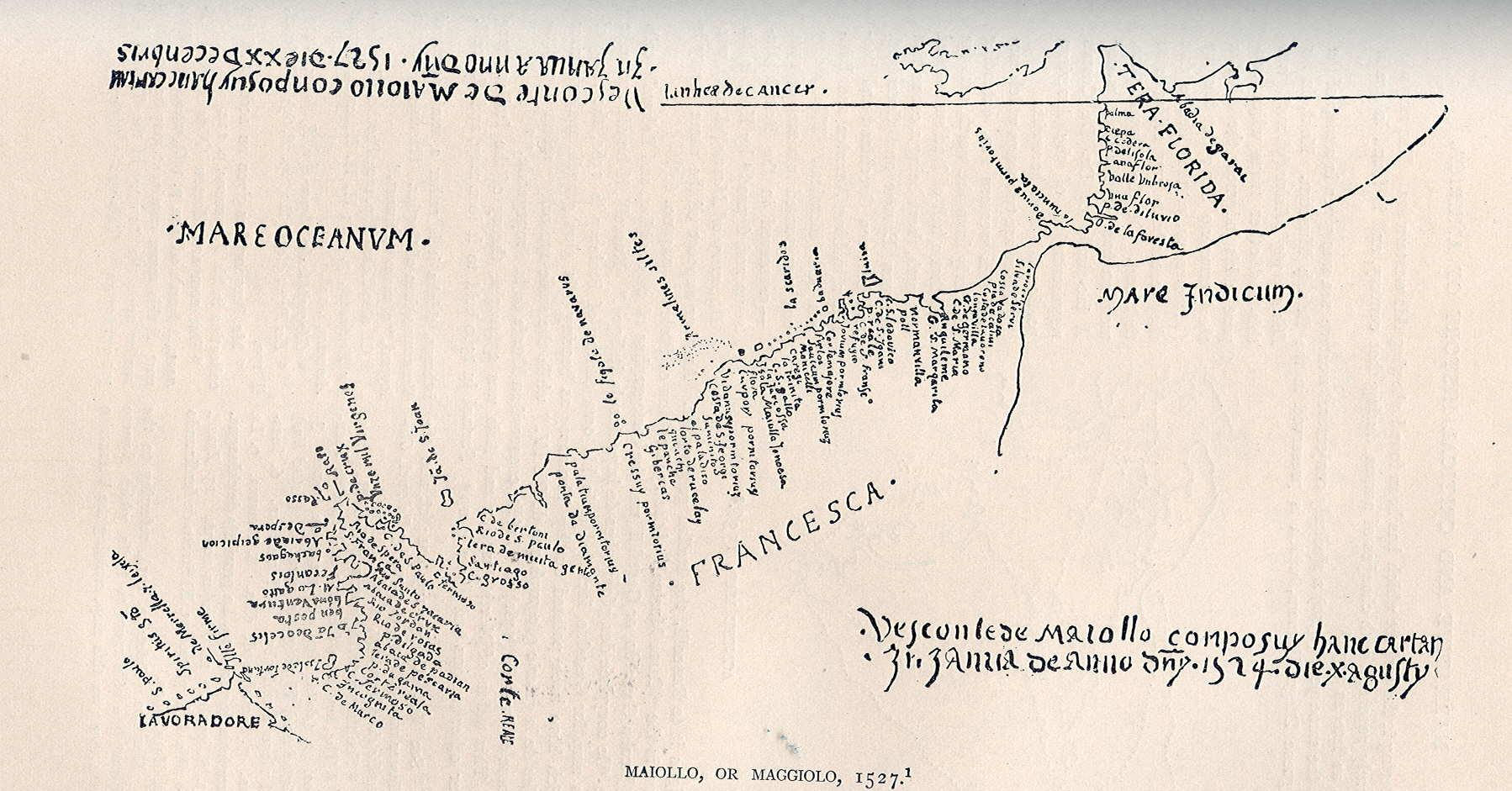
Map of North America by Vesconte Maggiolo after an earlier map made on the Verrazzano expedition of 1524. The narrow isthmus of land separating "Tera Florida" from "Francesca" is the Outer Banks of North Carolina. Cape Fear is labeled "C. de la Forest".

The earliest exploration of North Carolina by a European expedition is likely that of Giovanni da Verrazzano in 1524. An Italian from Verrazzano in the province of Florence, Verrazzano was hired by French merchants to procure a sea route to bring silk to the city of Lyon. With the tacit support of King Francis I, Verrazzano sailed west on January 1, 1524, aboard his ship La Dauphine ahead of a flotilla that numbered three ships. The expedition made landfall at Cape Fear, and Verrazzano reported of his explorations to the King of France,

"The seashore is completely covered with fine sand [15 feet] deep, which rises in the shape of small hills about fifty paces wide ... Nearby we could see a stretch of country much higher than the sandy shore, with many beautiful fields and planes[sic] full of great forests, some sparse and some dense; and the trees have so many colors, and are so beautiful and delightful that they defy description."

Verrazzano continued north along the Outer Banks, making periodic explorations as he sought a route further west towards China. When he viewed the Albemarle and Pamlico Sounds opposite the Outer Banks, he believed them to be the Pacific Ocean; his reports of such helped fuel the belief that the westward route to Asia was much closer than previously believed.

Just two years later, in 1526, a group of Spanish colonists from Hispaniola led by Lucas Vázquez de Ayllón landed at the mouth of a river they called the "Rio Jordan", which may have been the Cape Fear River. The party consisted of 500 men and women, their slaves, and horses. One of their ships wrecked off the shore, and valuable supplies were lost; this coupled with illness and rebellion doomed the colony. Ayllón died on October 18, 1526, and the 150 or so survivors of that first year abandoned the colony and attempted to return to Hispaniola. Later explorers reported finding their remains along the coast; as the dead were cast off during the return trip.

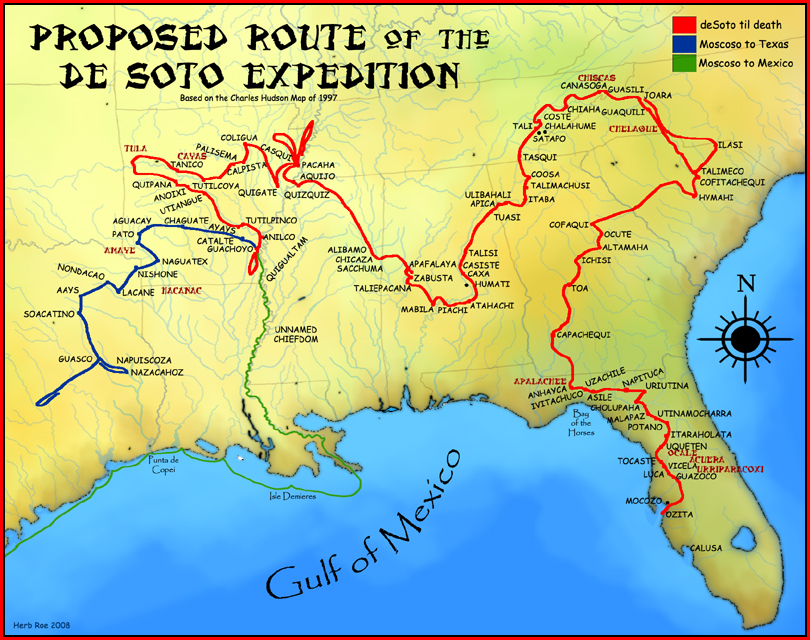
A map showing the proposed route of the de Soto Expedition, based on the 1997 Charles Hudson map

Hernando de Soto first explored west-central North Carolina during his 1539–1540 expedition. His first encounter with a native settlement in North Carolina may have been at Guaquilli, near modern Hickory. In 1567, Captain Juan Pardo led an expedition from Santa Elena at Parris Island, South Carolina, then the capital of the Spanish colony in the Southeast, into the interior of North Carolina, largely following De Soto's earlier route. His journey was ordered to claim the area as a Spanish colony, pacify and convert the natives, as well as establish another route to protect silver mines in Mexico (the Spanish did not realize the distances involved). Pardo went toward the northwest to be able to get food supplies from natives.

Pardo and his team made a winter base at Joara (near Morganton, in Burke County), which he renamed Cuenca. After building Fort San Juan, Pardo left about 30 Spaniards then traveled further, establishing five other forts. In 1567, Pardo's expedition established a mission called Salamanca in what is now Rowan County. Pardo returned by a different route to Santa Elena. After 18 months, in 1568, natives killed all but one of the Spaniards, and burned the six forts, including the one at Fort San Juan. The Spanish never returned to the interior to press their colonial claim, but this marked the first European attempt at colonization of the interior. Translation in the 1980s of a journal by Pardo's scribe Bandera have confirmed the expedition and settlement. Archaeological finds at Joara indicate that it was a Mississippian culture settlement and also indicate the Spanish settlement at Fort San Juan in 1567–1568. Joara was the largest mound builder settlement in the region. Records of Hernando de Soto's expedition attested to his meeting with them in 1540.

== British colonization ==
=== Roanoke Colony ===
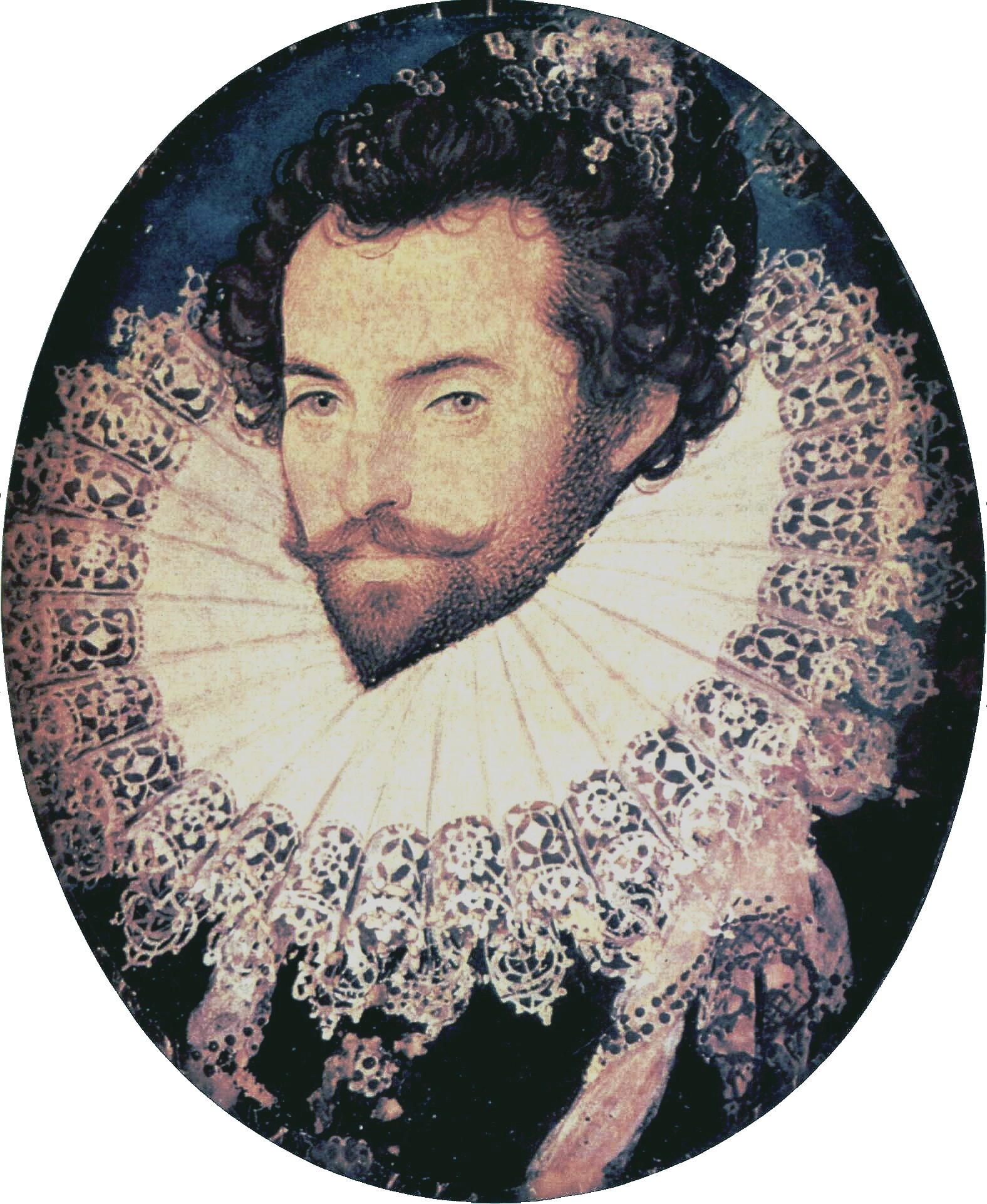
Sir Walter Raleigh, sponsor of the Roanoke Colony, and namesake of the capital city of North Carolina, Raleigh

The earliest English attempt at colonization in North America was Roanoke Colony of 1585–1587, the famed "Lost Colony" of Sir Walter Raleigh. The colony was established at Roanoke Island in the Croatan Sound on the leeward side of the Outer Banks. The first attempt at a settlement consisted of 100 or so colonists led by Ralph Lane. They built a fort, and waited for supplies from a second voyage. While waiting for supplies to return, Lane and his group antagonized the local Croatan peoples, killing several of them in armed skirmishes. The interactions were not all negative, as the local people did teach the colonists some survival skills, such as the construction of dugout canoes.

When the relief was long in coming, the colonists began to give up hope; after a chance encounter with Sir Francis Drake, the colonists elected to accept transport back to England with him. When the supply ships did arrive, only a few days later, they found the colony abandoned. The ship's captain, Richard Grenville, left a small force of 15 colonists to hold the fort and supplies and wait for a new stock of colonists.

In 1587, a third ship arrived carrying 110 men, 17 women, and 9 children, some of whom had been part of the first group of colonists that had earlier abandoned Roanoke. This group was led by John White. Among them was a pregnant woman, who gave birth to the first English colonist born in North America, Virginia Dare. The colonists found the remains of garrisons left behind, likely killed by the Croatan who had been so antagonized by Lane's aggressiveness. White had intended to pick up the remaining garrisons, abandon Roanoke Island, and settle in the Chesapeake Bay. White's Portuguese pilot, Simon Fernandes, refused to carry on further. Rather than risk mutiny, White agreed to resettle the former colony. The Spanish War prevented any further contact between the colony and England, until a 1590 expedition, which found no remains of any colonists, just an abandoned colony and the letters "CROATOAN" carved into a tree, and "CRO" carved into another. Despite many investigations, no one knows what happened to the colony. Historians widely believe that the colonists either died of starvation and illness, or they were taken in and assimilated with Native American tribes.

=== Development of North Carolina colony ===
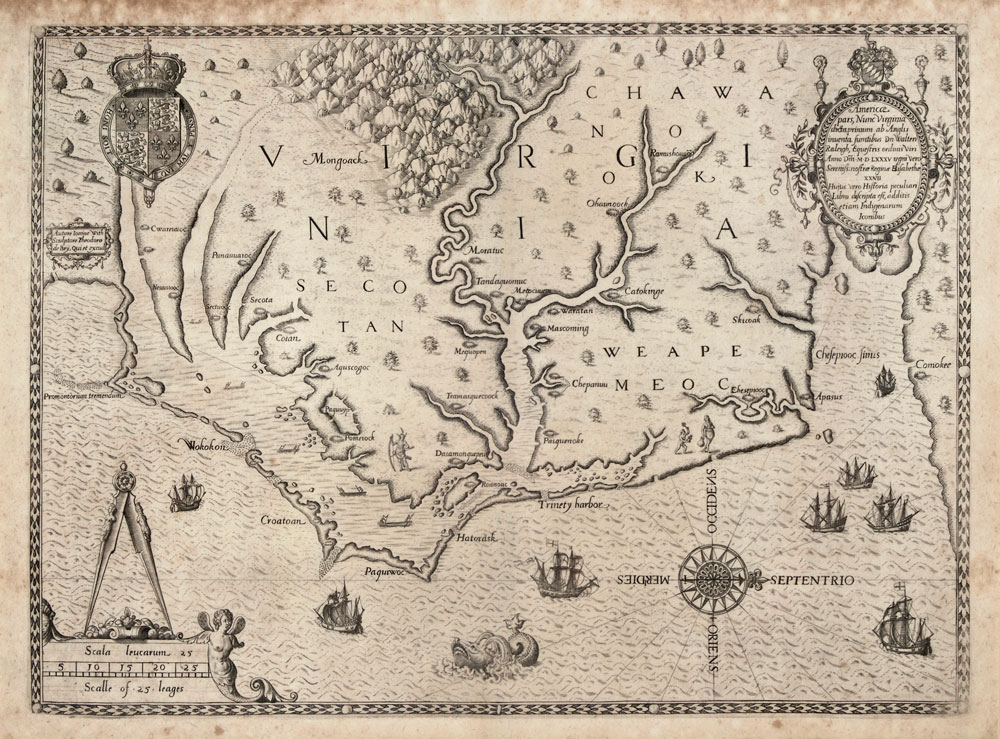
Map of the coast of Virginia and North Carolina, drawn 1585–86 by Theodor de Bry, based on map by John White of the Roanoke Colony

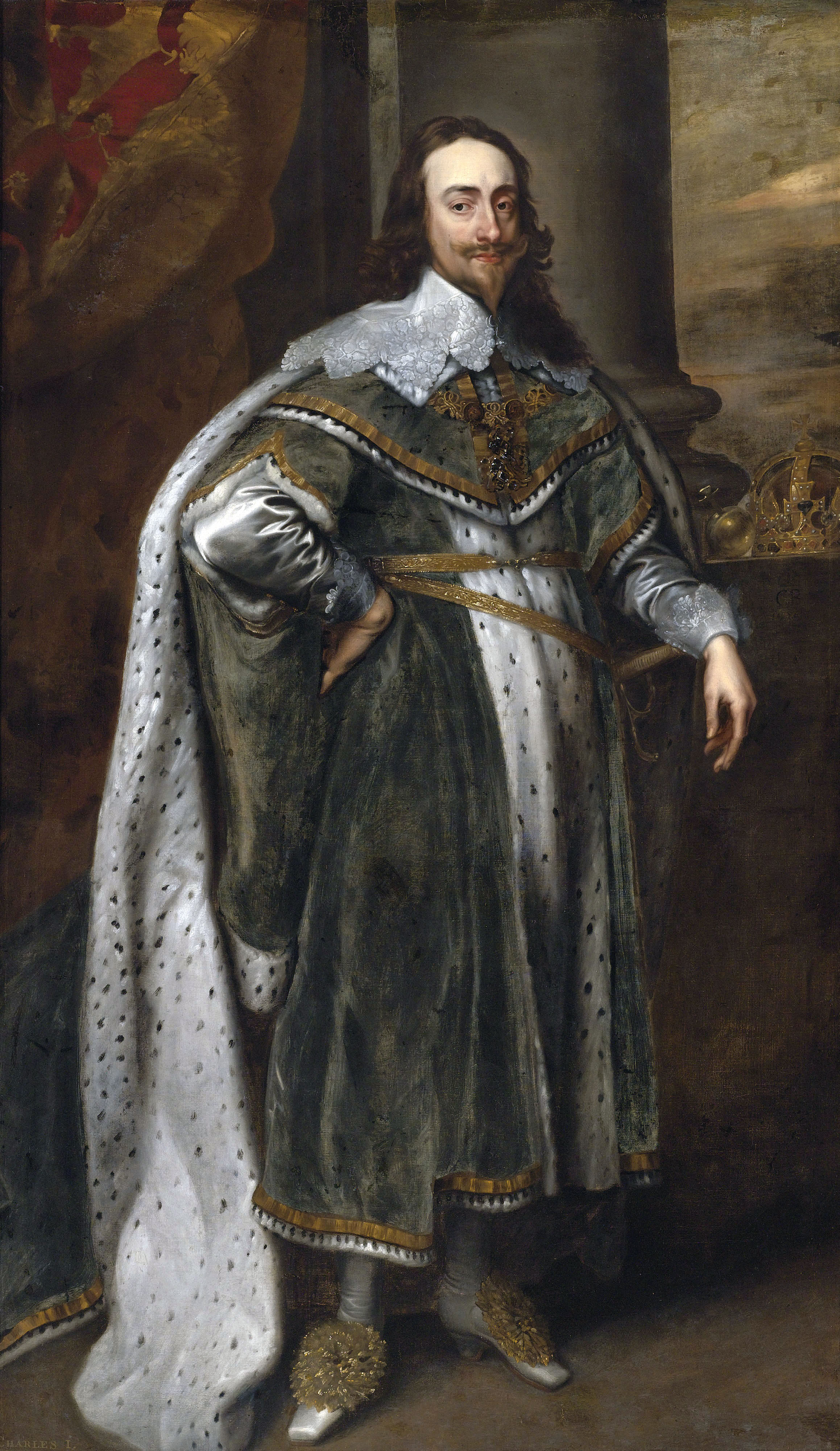
North Carolina is named after King Charles I of England. Carolina is taken from the Latin word for "Charles", Carolus.

The Province of North Carolina developed differently from South Carolina almost from the beginning. The Spanish experienced trouble colonizing North Carolina because it had a dangerous coastline, a lack of ports, and few inland rivers by which to navigate. In the 1650s and 1660s, settlers (mostly English) moved south from Virginia, in addition to runaway servants and fur trappers. They settled chiefly in the Albemarle borderlands region.

The first permanent European settlement in what became North Carolina was Edenton, established in 1658. Adventurers from the Jamestown area roaming the wilderness had come across a small natural harbor, now called Edenton Bay, and chosen to settle there. The settlement was later incorporated as a town in 1712.

In 1665, the Crown issued a second charter to resolve territorial questions. As early as 1689, the Carolina proprietors named a separate deputy-governor for the region of the colony that lay to the north and east of Cape Fear. The division of the province into North and South became official in 1712. The first colonial Governor of North Carolina was Edward Hyde who served from 1711 until 1712. North Carolina became a crown colony in 1729. Smallpox took a heavy toll in the region among Native Americans, who had no immunity to the disease, which had become endemic in Asia and Europe. The 1738 epidemic was said to have killed one-half of the Cherokee, with other tribes of the area suffering equally. Historians estimate there were about 5,000 settlers in 1700 and 11,000 in 1715.

While the voluntary settlers were mostly English, some settlers had brought Africans as laborers; most were enslaved. In the ensuing years, wealthier settlers imported and purchased more slaves to develop plantations in the lowland areas, and the African proportion of the population rose rapidly. A colony at New Bern was composed of Swiss and German settlers. In the late 18th century, more German immigrants migrated south after entry into Pennsylvania.

By 1712, the term "North Carolina" was in common use. In 1728, the dividing line between North Carolina and Virginia was surveyed. In 1730, the population in North Carolina was around 30,000. By 1729, the Crown bought out seven of the eight original proprietors and made the region a royal colony. John Carteret, 2nd Earl Granville refused to sell, and in 1744 he received rights to the vast Granville Tract, constituting the northern half of North Carolina.

Bath, the oldest incorporated town in North Carolina, was the first nominal capital from 1705 until 1722, when Edenton took over the role, but the colony had no permanent institutions of government until their establishment in the new capital New Bern in 1743. Raleigh would become capital of North Carolina in 1792.

In 1755 Benjamin Franklin, the Postmaster-General for the American colonies, appointed James Davis as the first postmaster of the North Carolina colony at New Bern. In October of that year the North Carolina Assembly awarded Davis the contract to carry the mail between Wilmington, North Carolina and Suffolk, Virginia.

=== Immigration from north ===
1751 Fry-Jefferson map depicting the Virginia Colony and surrounding provinces, including the Great Wagon Road spanning from Pennsylvania to North Carolina

The colony grew rapidly from a population of 100,000 in 1752 to 200,000 in 1765.

The Lord Proprietors encouraged importing of slaves to the Province of North Carolina by instituting a headright system that gave settlers acreage for the number of slaves that they brought to the province. The geography was a factor that slowed the importation of slaves. Settlers were forced to import slaves from Virginia or South Carolina because of the poor harbors and treacherous coastline. The enslaved black population grew from 800 in 1712 to 6,000 in 1730 and about 41,000 in 1767.

In the mid-to-late 18th century, the tide of immigration to North Carolina from Virginia and Pennsylvania began to swell. The Scots-Irish (Ulster Protestants) from what is today Northern Ireland were the largest immigrant group from the British Isles to the colonies before the American Revolution. In total, English indentured servants, who arrived mostly in the 17th and 18th centuries, comprised the majority of English settlers prior to the Revolution. On the eve of the American Revolution, North Carolina was the fastest-growing British colony in North America. The small family farms of Piedmont contrasted sharply with the plantation economy of the coastal region, where wealthy planters had established a slave society, growing tobacco and rice with slave labor.

Differences in the settlement patterns of eastern and western North Carolina, or the low country and uplands, affected the political, economic, and social life of the state from the 18th until the 20th century. The Tidewater in eastern North Carolina was settled chiefly by immigrants from rural England and the Scottish Highlands. The upcountry of western North Carolina was settled chiefly by Scots-Irish, English and German Protestants, the so-called "cohee". During the Revolutionary War, the English and Highland Scots of eastern North Carolina tended to have more loyalist towards the British Crown, because of longstanding business and personal connections with Great Britain. The English, Welsh, Scots-Irish and German settlers of the western half of North Carolina, largely tended to favor American independence from Britain.

With no cities and very few towns or villages, the colony was rural and thinly populated. Local taverns provided multiple services ranging from strong drink, beds for travelers, and meeting rooms for politicians and businessmen. In a world sharply divided along lines of ethnicity, gender, race, and class, the tavern keepers' rum proved a solvent that mixed together all sorts of locals, as well as travelers. The increasing variety of drinks on offer and the emergence of private clubs meeting in the taverns, showed that genteel culture was spreading from London to the periphery of the English colonial empire.

The courthouse was usually the most prominent building within a county. Jails were often an important part of the courthouse but were sometimes built separately. Some county governments built tobacco warehouses to provide a common service for their most important export crop.

=== Slavery ===
In the early years, the line between white indentured servants and African laborers was vague, as some Africans also arrived under an indenture, before more were transported as slaves. Some Africans were allowed to earn their freedom before slavery became a lifelong racial caste. Most of the free colored families found in North Carolina in the censuses of 1790–1810 were descended from unions or marriages between free white women and enslaved or free African or African-American men in colonial Virginia. Because the mothers were free, their children were born free. Such mixed-race families migrated along with their European-American neighbors into the frontier of North Carolina. As the flow of indentured laborers slackened because of improving economic conditions in Britain, the colony was short on labor and imported more slaves from European slavers who traded or purchased them from African tribal chiefs in West Africa. It followed Virginia in increasing its controls on slavery, which became a racial caste of the foreign Africans.

Much of the economy's growth and prosperity was based on slave labor, devoted first to the production of tobacco. The often oppressive and brutal experiences of slaves and poor whites led many of them to resort to escape, violent resistance, and theft of food and other goods to survive.

=== Politics ===
In the late 1760s, tensions between Piedmont farmers and coastal planters developed into the Regulator movement. With specie scarce, many inland farmers found themselves unable to pay their taxes and resented the consequent seizure of their property. Local sheriffs sometimes kept taxes for their own gain and sometimes charged twice for the same tax. Governor William Tryon's conspicuous consumption in the construction of a new governor's mansion at New Bern fueled the resentment of yeoman farmers. As the western districts were under-represented in the colonial legislature, the farmers could not obtain redress by legislative means. The frustrated farmers took to arms and closed the court in Hillsborough, North Carolina. Tryon sent troops to the region and defeated the Regulators at the Battle of Alamance in May 1771, where several leaders of the movement, including Captain Robert Messer, Captain Benjamin Merrill, and Captain Robert Matear, were captured and hanged.

== New nation ==
=== American Revolution ===
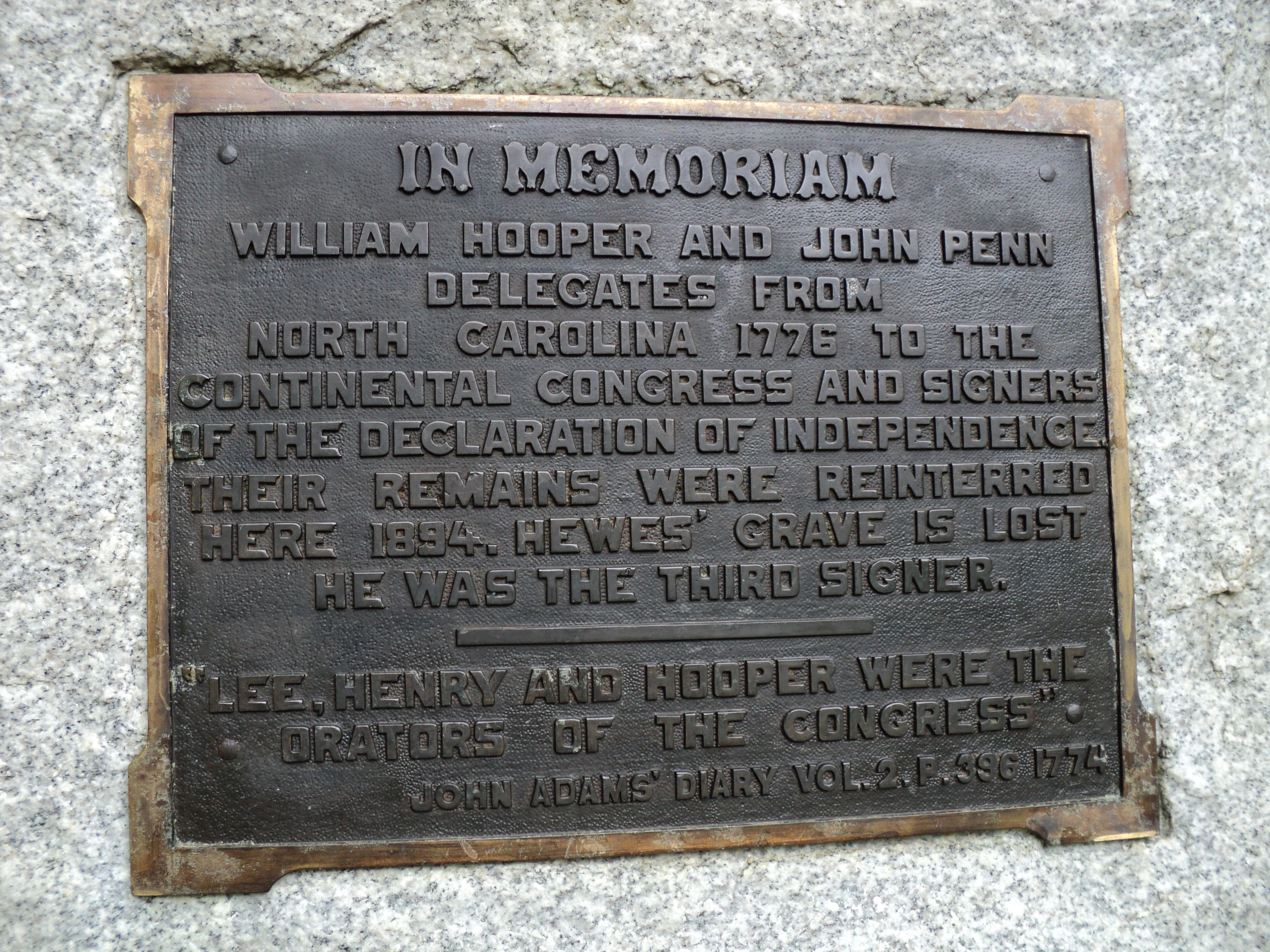
Signers Monument, Guilford Courthouse National Military Park, in Greensboro

The demand for independence came from local grassroots organizations called "Committees of Safety". The First Continental Congress had urged their creation in 1774. By 1775, they had become counter-governments that gradually replaced royal authority and took control of local governments. They regulated the economy, politics, morality, and militia of their individual communities, but many local feuds were played out under ostensibly political affiliations. After December 1776 they came under the control of a more powerful central authority, the Council of Safety.

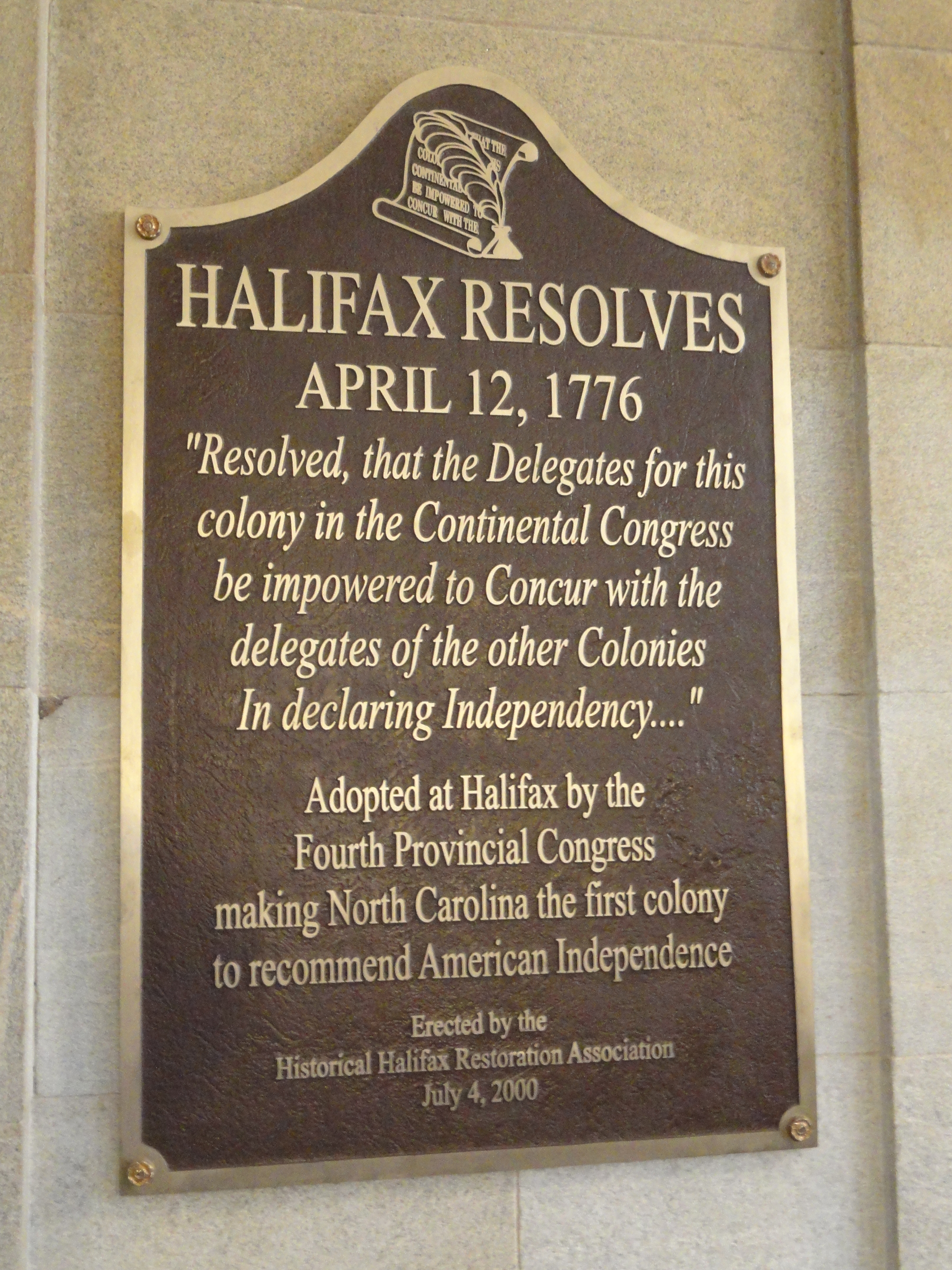
Halifax Resolves plaque

In the spring of 1776, North Carolinians, meeting in the fourth of their Provincial Congresses, drafted the Halifax Resolves, a set of resolutions that empowered the state's delegates to the Second Continental Congress to concur in a declaration of independence from Great Britain. In July 1776, the new state became part of the new nation, the United States of America.

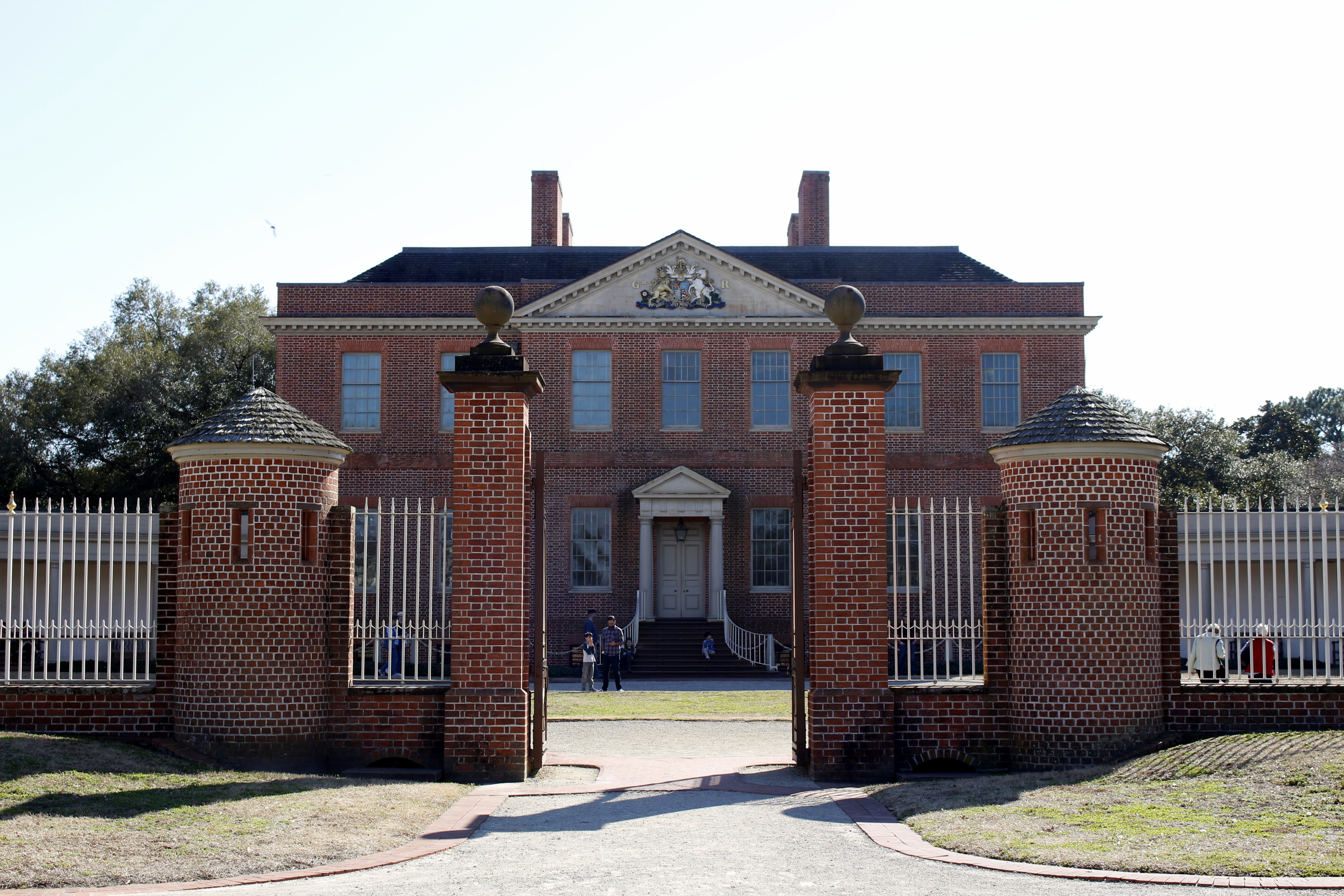
Reconstructed royal governor's mansion, Tryon Palace, in New Bern

In 1775, the Patriots easily expelled the Royal governor and suppressed the Loyalists. In November 1776, elected representatives gathered in Halifax to write a new state constitution, which remained in effect until 1835. One of the most prominent Loyalists was John Leggett, a rich planter in Bladen County. He organized and led one of the few loyalist brigades in the South (the North Carolina Volunteers, later known as the Royal North Carolina Regiment). After the war, Colonel Leggett and some of his soldiers moved to Nova Scotia; the British gave them free land grants in County Harbour as compensation for their losses in the colony. The great majority of Loyalists remained in North Carolina and became citizens of the new nation.

Local militia units proved important in the guerrilla war of 1780–81. Soldiers who enlisted in George Washington's Continental Army fought in numerous battles up and down the land.

Struggling with a weak tax base, state officials used impressment to seize food and supplies needed for the war effort, paying the farmers with promissory notes. To raise soldiers, state officials tried a draft law. Both policies created significant discontent that undermined support for the new nation. The state's large German population, concentrated in the central counties, tried to remain neutral; the Moravians were pacifist because of strong religious beliefs, while Lutheran and Reformed Germans were passively neutral. All peace groups paid triple taxes in lieu of military service.

The British were punctual in paying their regulars and their Loyalist forces, but American soldiers went month after month in threadbare uniforms with no pay and scanty supplies. Belatedly, the state tried to make amends. After 1780, soldiers received cash bounties, a slave "or the value thereof," clothing, food, and land (after 1782 they received from 640 to 1,200 acres depending on rank). Since the money supply, based on the Continental currency was subject to high inflation and loss of value, state officials valued compensation in relation to gold and silver.

==== Military campaigns of 1780–81 ====
After 1780, the British tried to rouse and arm the Loyalists, believing they were numerous enough to make a difference. The result was fierce guerrilla warfare between units of Patriots and Loyalists. Often the opportunity was seized to settle private grudges and feuds. A major American victory took place at King's Mountain along the North Carolina– South Carolina border. On October 7, 1780, a force of 1,000 Patriots from western North Carolina (including what is today part of Tennessee) overwhelmed a force of some 1,000 Loyalist and British troops led by Major Patrick Ferguson. The victory essentially ended British efforts to recruit more Loyalists.

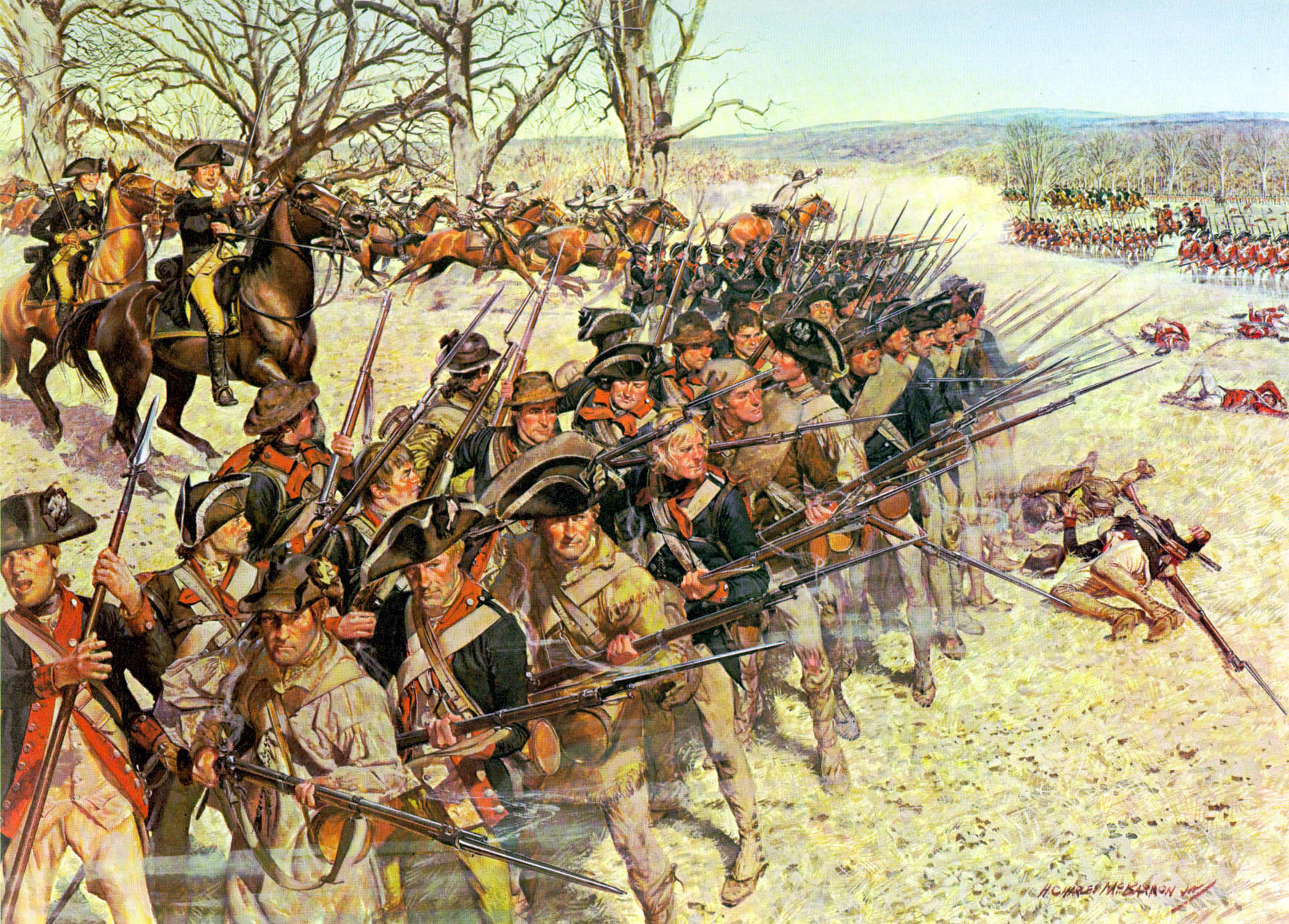
1st Maryland Regiment holding the line at the Battle of Guilford Courthouse, 1781

The road to the American victory at Yorktown led by North Carolina. As the British army moved north toward Virginia, the Southern Division of the Continental Army and local militia prepared to meet them. Following General Daniel Morgan's victory over the British under Banastre Tarleton at the Battle of Cowpens on January 17, 1781, the southern commander Nathanael Greene led British Lord Charles Cornwallis across the heartland of North Carolina, and away from Cornwallis's base of supply in Charleston, South Carolina. This campaign is known as "The Race to the Dan" or "The Race for the River."

Generals Greene and Cornwallis finally met at the Battle of Guilford Courthouse in present-day Greensboro on March 15, 1781. Although the British troops held the field at the end of the battle, their casualties at the hands of the numerically superior Continental Army were crippling. Cornwallis had a poor strategic plan which had failed in holding his heavily garrisoned positions in South Carolina and Georgia and had failed to subdue North Carolina. By contrast, Greene used a more flexible adaptive approach that negated the British advantages and built an adequate logistical foundation for the American campaigns. Greene's defensive operations provided his forces the opportunity to later seize the strategic offensive from Comwallis and eventually reclaim the Carolinas. The weakened Cornwallis headed to the Virginia coastline to be rescued by the Royal Navy. A French fleet repulsed the British Navy and Cornwallis, surrounded by American and French units, surrendered to George Washington, effectively ending the fighting.

By 1786, the population of North Carolina had increased to 350,000.

=== Early Republic ===
The United States Constitution drafted in 1787 was controversial in North Carolina. Delegate meetings at Hillsborough in July 1788 initially voted to reject it for Anti-Federalist reasons. They were persuaded to change their minds partly by the strenuous efforts of James Iredell and William R. Davie and partly by the prospect of a Bill of Rights. Meanwhile, residents in the wealthy northeastern part of the state, who generally supported the proposed Constitution, threatened to secede if the rest of the state did not fall into line. A second ratifying convention was held in Fayetteville in November 1789, and on November 21, North Carolina became the 12th state to ratify the U.S. Constitution.

North Carolina adopted a new state constitution in 1835. One of the major changes was the introduction of direct election of the governor, for a term of two years; prior to 1835, the legislature elected the governor for a term of one year. North Carolina's historic capitol building was completed in 1840.

==== Transportation ====
In mid-century, the state's rural and commercial areas were connected by the construction of a 129–mile (208 km) wooden plank road, known as a "farmer's railroad", from Fayetteville in the east to Bethania (northwest of Winston-Salem).

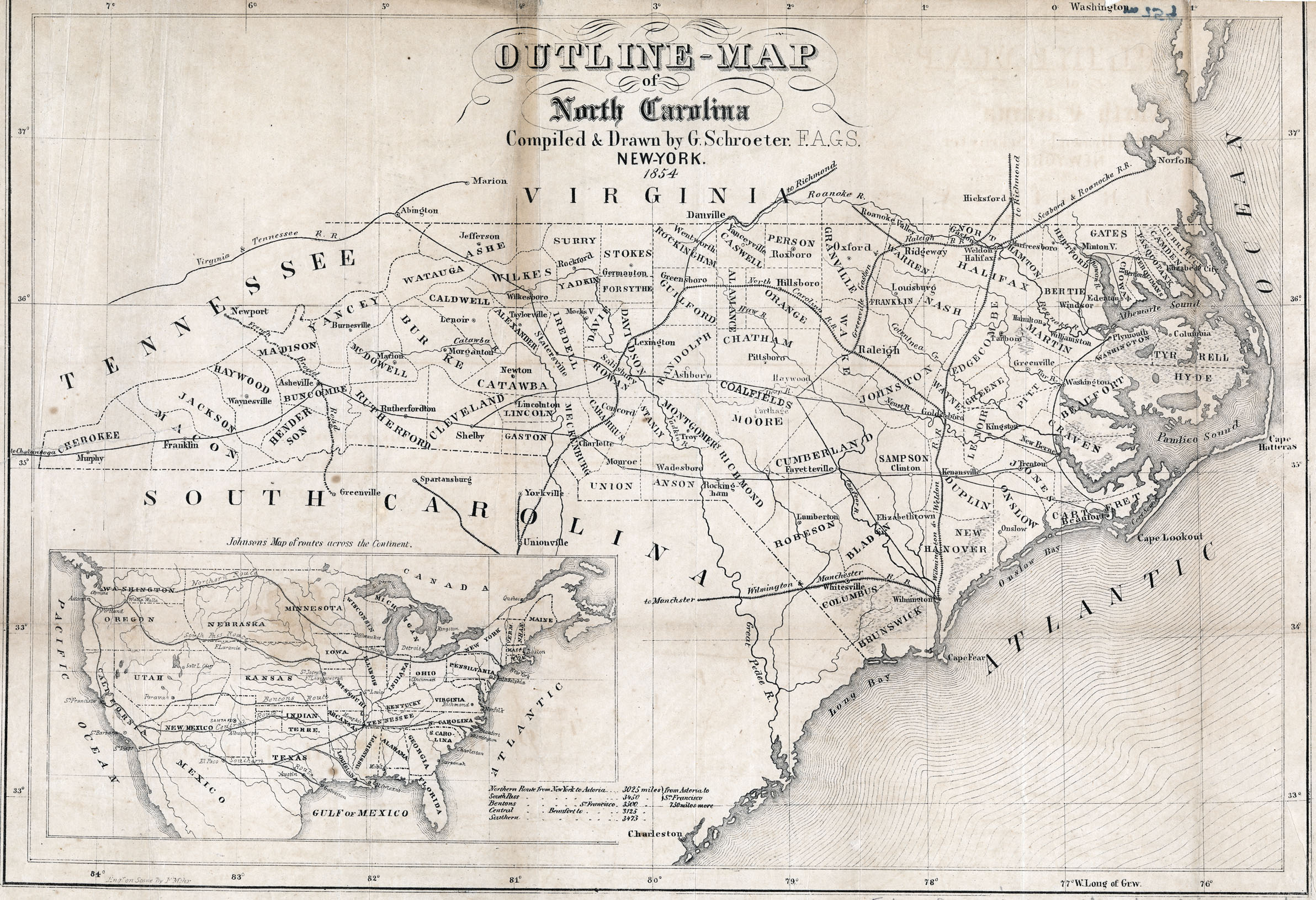
Map of the roads and railroads of North Carolina, 1854

On October 25, 1836 construction began on the Wilmington and Raleigh Railroad to connect the port city of Wilmington with the state capital of Raleigh. In 1849, the North Carolina Railroad was created by an act of the legislature to extend that railroad west to Greensboro, High Point, and Charlotte. During the Civil War, the Wilmington-to-Raleigh stretch of the railroad was vital to the Confederate war effort; supplies shipped into Wilmington would be moved by rail through Raleigh to the Confederate capital of Richmond, Virginia.

==== Rural life ====
During the antebellum period, North Carolina was an overwhelmingly rural state. In 1860, only one town, the port city of Wilmington, had a population of more than 10,000. Raleigh, the state capital, had barely more than 5,000 residents.

The majority of white families comprised the Plain Folk of the Old South, or "yeoman farmers." They owned their own small farms, with some owning a few slaves. Most of their efforts were to build up the farm and feed their families, with a little surplus sold on the market to pay taxes and buy necessities.

==== Plantations, slavery and free blacks ====
After the Revolution, Quakers and Mennonites worked to persuade slaveholders to free their slaves. Some were inspired by their efforts and the revolutionary ideas to arrange for manumission of their slaves. The number of free people of color in the state rose markedly in the first couple of decades after the Revolution. Most of the free people of color in the censuses of 1790–1810 were descended from African Americans who became free in colonial Virginia, the children of unions and marriages between white women and African men. These descendants migrated to the frontier during the late eighteenth century along with white neighbors. Free people of color also became concentrated in the eastern coastal plain, especially at port cities such as Wilmington and New Bern, where they could get a variety of jobs and had more freedom in the cities. Restrictions increased beginning in the 1820s; movement by free people of color between counties was prohibited. Additional restrictions against their movements in 1830 under a quarantine act. Free mariners of color on visiting ships were prohibited from having contact with any blacks in the state, in violation of United States treaties. In 1835, free people of color lost the right to vote, following white fears aroused after Nat Turner's Slave Rebellion in 1831. By 1860, there were 30,463 free people of color who lived in the state but could not vote.

Abolitionists from North Carolina included Harriet Jacobs who managed to escape from slavery in Edenton in 1842. Her autobiography, Incidents in the Life of a Slave Girl is now considered an "American classic".

Most of North Carolina's slave owners and large plantations were located in the eastern portion of the state. Although its plantation system was smaller and less cohesive than those of Virginia, Georgia or South Carolina, significant numbers of planters were concentrated in the counties around the port cities of Wilmington and Edenton, as well as in Piedmont around the cities of Raleigh, Charlotte, and Durham. Planters owning large estates wielded significant political and socio-economic power in antebellum North Carolina, placing their interests above those of the generally non-slave holding "yeoman" farmers of the western part of the state. "By 1860, the state legislature had a higher percentage (85) of politicians owning human beings than any statehouse in the country."

While slaveholding was less concentrated in North Carolina than in some Southern states, according to the 1860 census, more than 330,000 people, or 33% of the population of 992,622, were enslaved African Americans. They lived and worked chiefly on plantations in the eastern Tidewater and the upland areas of Piedmont.

=== Whigs versus Democrats ===
Two party competition was the main theme during the Second Party System in the state, 1824 to early 1850s. According to Max R. Williams, voters in the 1820s became polarized over general Andrew Jackson. After his victory in 1828 as President, his enemies pulled together to form the new Whig party, thus introducing competitive two-party politics in the state. By 1836, the Jacksonians had formed the modern Democratic Party. Both parties were well organized at the county level, with their voters drilled in army-style tactics to march to the polls and declare victory on election say. In 1832, however, Democrats triumphed, giving Jackson 84% of the vote for his reelection. However, Jackson's war on the banking system alienated the business – oriented voters, and they staffed and funded the Whig party. They came to power using the revised new state constitution in 1835, and build a strong base in the western counties. Moving beyond negativism, the Whigs developed a positive program for modernization of the economically backward rural state. The Whigs used the state government to foster internal improvements, especially in terms of better transportation systems, and new education opportunities. The Whigs rallied around Kentuckian Henry Clay, and his American plan for economic and social modernization. They opposed westward expansion and rejected "manifest destiny". Both parties had a broad base in terms of geography and social class. The North Carolina Whig party was a replica in one state of the national party.

== Civil War through late 19th century ==
=== Civil War ===
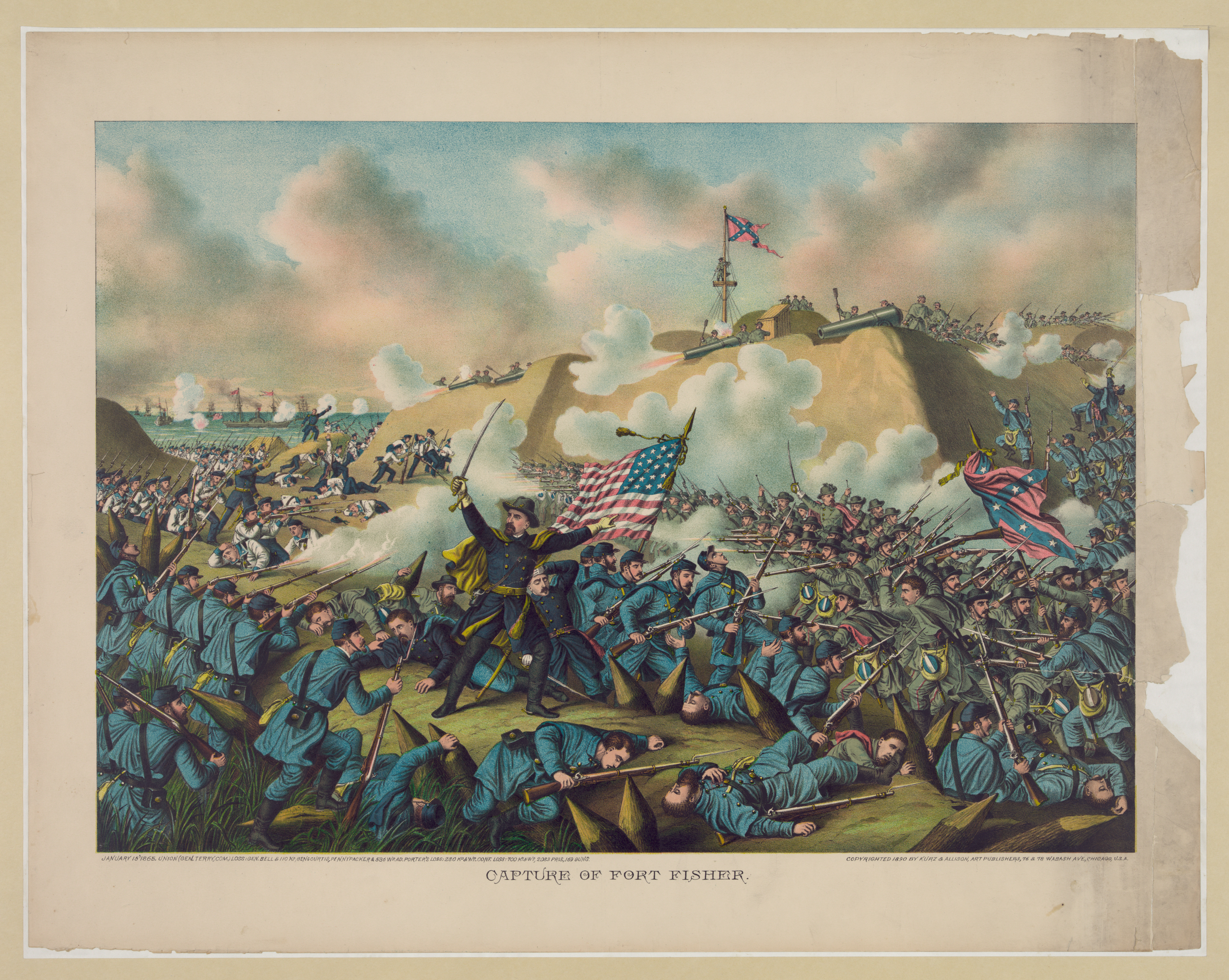
Union captures Fort Fisher, 1865

In 1860, North Carolina was a slave state, in which about one-third of the population of 992,622 were enslaved African Americans. In addition, the state had just over 30,000 Free African Americans. There were relatively few large plantations or old aristocratic families. North Carolina was reluctant to secede from the Union when it became clear that Republican Abraham Lincoln had won the presidential election. With the attack on Fort Sumter in April 1861, and Lincoln's call for troops to march into South Carolina, North Carolina legislators decided to not attack South Carolina, leading to North Carolina joining the Confederacy.

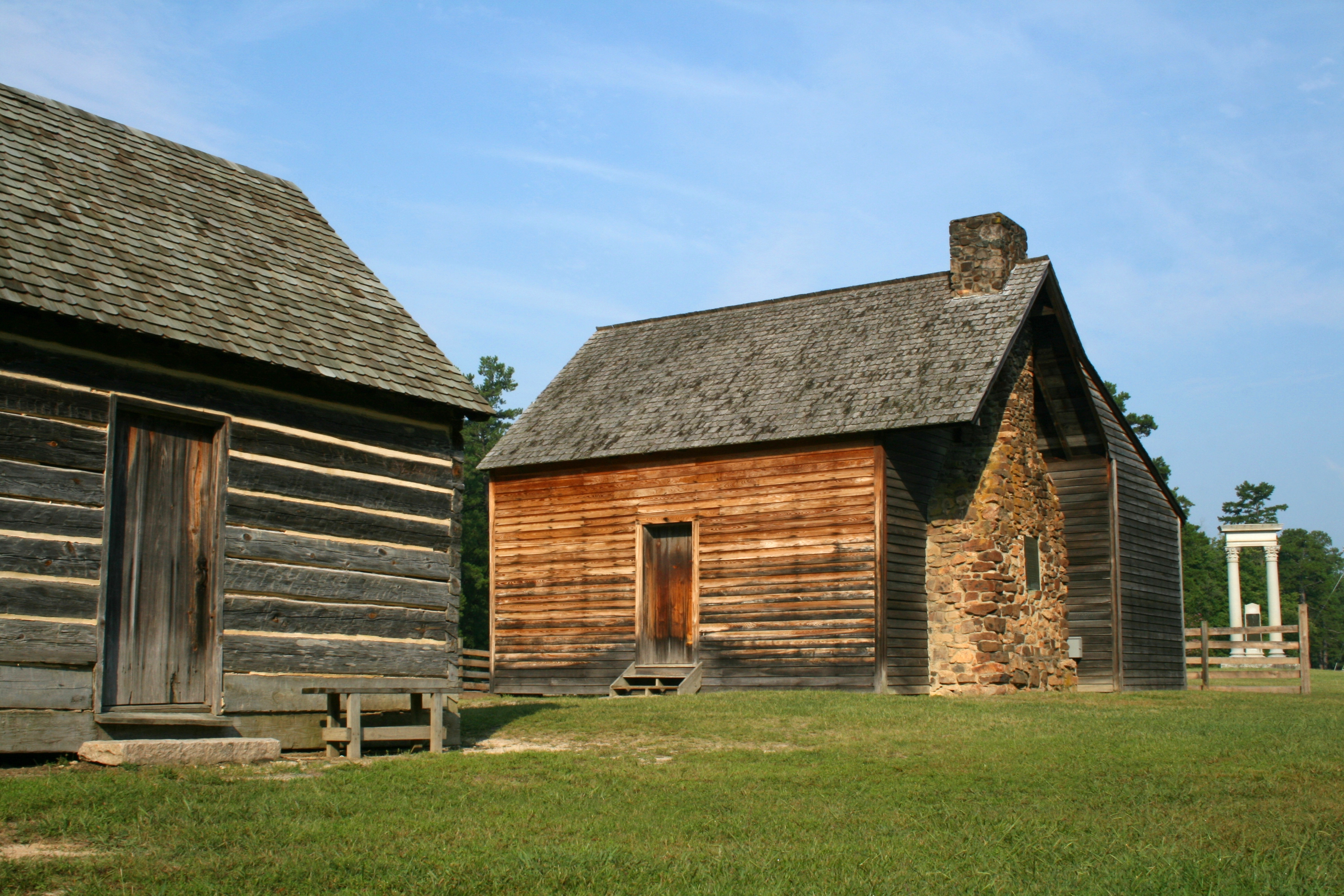
Bennett Place, historic site of major Confederate surrender in Durham

North Carolina was the site of few battles, though it provided at least 125,000 troops to the Confederacy. North Carolina also supplied about 15,000 Union troops. Over 30,000 North Carolina soldiers would die of disease, battlefield wounds, or starvation. Confederate troops from all parts of North Carolina served in virtually all the major battles of the Army of Northern Virginia, the Confederacy's most famous army. The largest battle fought in North Carolina was at Bentonville, which was a futile attempt by Confederate General Joseph Johnston to slow Union General William Tecumseh Sherman's advance through the Carolinas in the spring of 1865. In April 1865 after losing the Battle of Morrisville, Johnston surrendered to Sherman at Bennett Place, in what is today Durham, North Carolina. This was the next to last major Confederate Army to surrender. North Carolina's port city of Wilmington was the last major Confederate port for blockade runners; it fell in the spring of 1865 after the nearby Second Battle of Fort Fisher.

Elected in 1862, Governor Zebulon Baird Vance tried to maintain state autonomy against Confederate President Jefferson Davis.

The Union's naval blockade of Southern ports and the breakdown of the Confederate transportation system took a heavy toll on North Carolina residents, as did the runaway inflation of the war years. In the spring of 1863, there were food riots in North Carolina as town dwellers found it hard to buy food. On the other hand, blockade runners brought prosperity to several port cities, until they were shut down by the Union Navy in 1864–65.

North Carolina Union troops played key roles during the war as well, with the 3rd North Carolina Cavalry taking part in the Battle of Bull's Gap, Battle of Red Banks, and Stoneman's 1864 and 1865 raids in western North Carolina, southwest Virginia, and eastern Tennessee. Approximately 10,000 white North Carolinians, and 5,000 black North Carolinians, joined Union Army units. They consisted of soldiers in North Carolina Union regiments, Confederate Army deserters who later joined the Union Army, and those who left the state to join Union Army units elsewhere.

=== Reconstruction era ===
During Reconstruction, many African-American leaders arose from people free before the war, those who had escaped to the North and decided to return, and educated migrants from the North who wanted to help in the postwar years. Many who had been in the North had gained some education before their return. In general, however, illiteracy was a problem shared in the early postwar years by most African Americans and about one-third of the whites in the state.

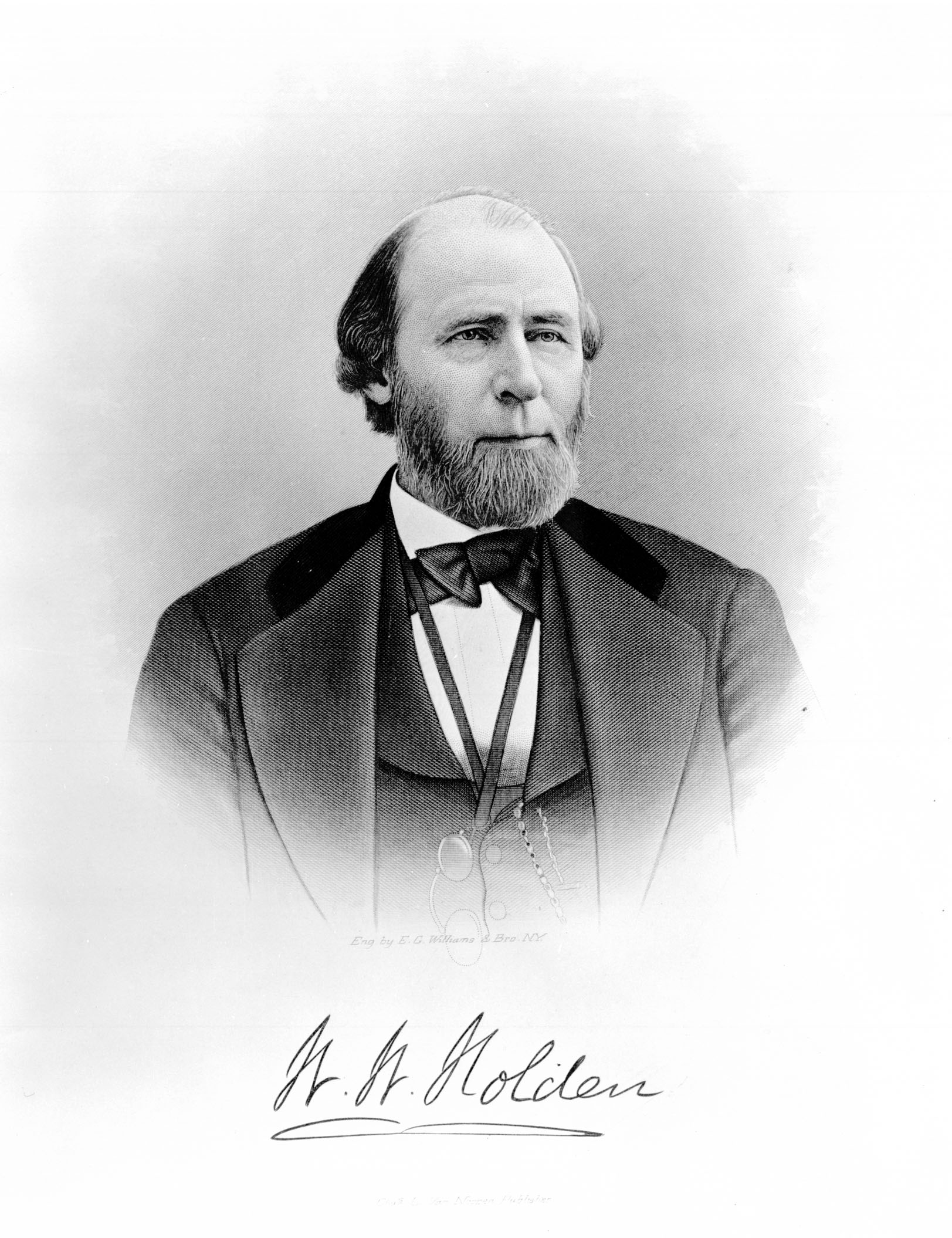
William Woods Holden, a Unionist who served as the 38th and 40th Governor of North Carolina, and during the Reconstruction era

A number of white northerners migrated to North Carolina to work and invest. While feelings in the state were high against carpetbaggers, of the 133 persons at the constitutional convention, only 18 were Northern carpetbaggers and 15 were African Americans. North Carolina was readmitted to the Union in 1868, after ratifying a new state constitution. It included provisions to establish public education for the first time, prohibit slavery, and adopt universal suffrage. It also provided for public welfare institutions for the first time: orphanages, public charities and a penitentiary. The legislature ratified the Fourteenth Amendment to the U.S. Constitution.

In 1870, the Democratic Party regained power in the state. Governor William W. Holden had used civil powers and spoken out to try to combat the Ku Klux Klan's increasing violence, which was used to suppress black and Republican voting. Conservatives accused him of being head of the Union League, believing in social equality between the races, and practicing political corruption. But, when the legislature voted to impeach him, it charged him only with using and paying troops to put down insurrection (Ku Klux Klan activity) in the state. Holden was impeached, and turned over his duties to Lieutenant Governor Tod R. Caldwell on December 20, 1870. The trial began on January 30, 1871, and lasted nearly three months. On March 22, the North Carolina Senate found Holden guilty and ordered him removed from office. He was the first governor in the United States to be removed from office through impeachment.

After the national Ku Klux Klan Act of 1871 went into effect in an effort to reduce violence in the South, the U.S. Attorney General, Amos T. Akerman, vigorously prosecuted Klan members in North Carolina. During the late 1870s, there was renewed violence in the Piedmont area, where whites tried to suppress black voting in elections. Beginning in 1875, the Red Shirts, a paramilitary group, openly worked for the Democrats to suppress black voting.

As in other Southern states, after white Democrats regained power, they worked to re-establish white supremacy politically and socially. Paramilitary groups such as the Red Shirts beginning in 1875, worked openly to disrupt black political meetings, intimidate leaders and directly challenge voters in campaigns and elections, especially in the Piedmont area. They sometimes physically attacked black voters and community leaders.

=== Post-Reconstruction and disfranchisement ===
In the 1880s, black officeholders were at a peak level in local offices, where much business was done, as they were elected from black-majority districts. By the 1890s, white Democrats had regained power on the state level.

Post–Civil War racial politics encouraged efforts to divide and co-opt groups. In the drive to regain power, Democrats supported an effort by state representative Harold McMillan to create separate school districts in 1885 for "Croatan Indians" to gain their support. Of mixed race and claiming Native American heritage, the families had been classified as free people of color in the antebellum years and did not want to send their children to public school classes with former slaves. After having voted with the Republicans, they switched to the Democrats. (In 1913, the group changed their name to "Cherokee Indians of Robeson County", "Siouan Indians of Lumber River" in 1934–1935, and were given limited recognition as Indians by the U.S. Congress as Lumbee in 1956. The Lumbee are one of several Native American tribes that have been officially recognized by the state in the 21st century.)

In 1894, after years of agricultural problems in the state, an interracial coalition of Republicans and Populists won a majority of seats in the state legislature and elected as governor, Republican Daniel L. Russell, the Fusionist candidate. That year North Carolina's 2nd congressional district elected George Henry White, an educated African-American attorney, as its third black representative to Congress since the Civil War.

Democrats worked to break up the biracial coalition, and reduce voting by blacks and poor whites. In 1896, North Carolina passed a statute that made voter registration more complicated and reduced the number of blacks on voter registration rolls.

In 1898, in an election characterized by violence, fraud, and intimidation of black voters by Red Shirts, white Democrats regained control of the state legislature. Two days after the election, a small group of whites in Wilmington implemented their plan to take over the city government if the Democrats were not elected, although the mayor and a majority of city council were white. The cadre led 1500 whites against the black newspaper and neighborhood in the Wilmington massacre of 1898; the mob and other whites killed an estimated 60 to more than 300 people. The cadre forced the resignation of Republican officeholders, including the white mayor, and mostly white aldermen, and ran them out of town. They replaced them with their own slate and that day elected Alfred M. Waddell as mayor. This is the only coup d'état (violent overthrow of an elected government) in United States history.

In 1899, the Democrat-dominated state legislature ratified a new constitution with a suffrage amendment, whose requirements for poll taxes, literacy tests, lengthier residency, and similar mechanisms disfranchised most blacks and many poor whites. Illiterate whites were protected by a grandfather clause so that if a father or grandfather had voted in 1860 (when all voters were white), his sons or grandsons did not have to pass the literacy test of 1899. This grandfather clause excluded all blacks, as free people of color had lost the franchise in 1835. The US Supreme Court ruled in 1915, that such grandfather clauses were unconstitutional. Every voter had to pay the poll tax until it was abolished by the state in 1920.

Congressman George Henry White, an African-American Republican, said after passage of this constitution in 1899, "I cannot live in North Carolina and be a man and be treated as a man." He had been re-elected in 1898, but the next year announced his decision not to seek a third term, saying he would leave the state instead. He moved his law practice to Washington, D.C. and later to Philadelphia, where he founded a commercial bank.

By 1904, black voter turnout had been utterly reduced in North Carolina. Contemporary accounts estimated that 75,000 black male citizens lost their vote. In 1900, blacks numbered 630,207 citizens, about 33% of the state's total population, and were unable to elect representatives.

With control of the legislature, white Democrats passed Jim Crow laws establishing racial segregation in public facilities and transportation. African Americans worked for more than 60 years to regain full power to exercise the suffrage and other constitutional rights of citizens. Without the ability to vote, they were excluded from juries and lost all chance at local offices: sheriffs, justices of the peace, jurors, county commissioners and school board members, which were the active site of government around the start of the 20th century. Suppression of the black vote and re-establishment of white supremacy suppressed knowledge of what had been a thriving black middle class in the state. By 1900, the Republicans were no longer competitive in state politics, although they had strongholds within the states mountain districts and some piedmont counties.

== 20th century ==
=== Early 20th century ===
By 1900 North Carolina, along with all the southern states, imposed strict legal segregation known as "Jim Crow laws".

==== Progressive movement ====
What had been a poor rural backward state took a regional leadership role in modernizing the economy and society, based on expanded roles for public education, state universities, and more roles for middle class women. State leaders included Governor Charles B. Aycock, who led both the educational and the white supremacy crusades; diplomat Walter Hines Page; and educator Charles Duncan McIver. Women were especially active through the WCTU in church activism, promoting prohibition, missions and public schools, ending child labor in the textile mills, supporting public health campaigns to eradicate hookworm and other debilitating diseases. They promoted gender equality and woman suffrage, and demanded a single standard of sexual morality for men and women.

In the black community, Charlotte Hawkins Brown, built the Palmer Memorial Institute to educate the black leadership class. Brown worked with Booker T. Washington of the National Negro Business League), who provided ideas and access to Northern philanthropy.

==== Education reform ====
North Carolina was the leader among all the southern states in promoting public education, as well as higher education, throughout the 20th century. In the 1900 gubernatorial election, Charles Aycock launched his successful crusade for upgrading public education. Aycock increased funding for schools, raised teacher salaries, and oversaw the construction of over a thousand new schoolhouses. He preached that education was essential for social and economic progress in the state.

All schools were segregated, and Black schools had much worse facilities, but they also were improved. Across the South John D. Rockefeller Jr. provided large-scale subsidies for black schools, which otherwise continued to be underfunded. The South was helped in the 1920s and 1930s by the Julius Rosenwald Fund, which contributed matching funds to local communities for the construction of thousands of schools for African Americans in rural areas throughout the South. Black parents organized to raise the money, and donated land and labor to build improved schools for their children.

=== Black movement ===
Reacting to segregation, disfranchisement in 1899, and difficulties in agriculture in the early 20th century, tens of thousands of African Americans left the state (and hundreds of thousands began to leave the rest of the South) for the North and Midwest; looking for better opportunities in the Great Migration. In its first wave, from 1910 to 1940, one and a half million African Americans left the South. They went to places such as Washington D.C., Baltimore, and Philadelphia; and sometimes further north, to industrial cities where there was work, usually taking the trains to connecting cities.

=== Other trends ===
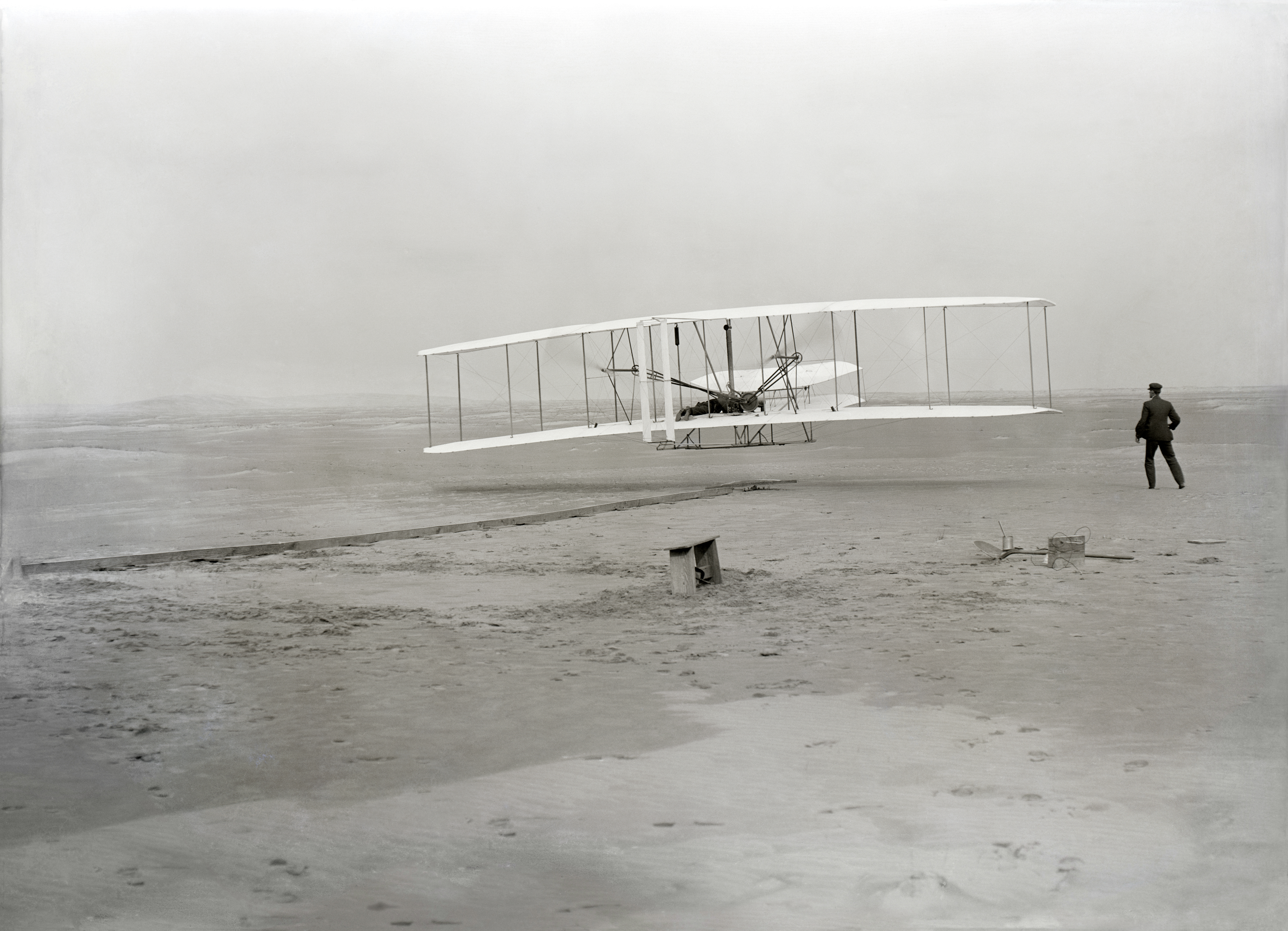
First successful flight of the Wright Flyer, near Kitty Hawk, 1903

On December 17, 1903, the Wright brothers made the first successful airplane flight at Kitty Hawk, North Carolina.

During World War I, the decrepit shipbuilding industry was revived by large-scale federal contracts landed with Congressional help. Nine new shipyards opened in North Carolina to build ships under contracts from the Emergency Fleet Corporation. Four steamships were made of concrete, but most were made of wood or steel. Thousands of workers rushed to high-paying jobs, as the managers found a shortage of highly skilled mechanics, as well as a housing shortage. Although unions were weak, labor unrest and managerial inexperience caused the delays. The shipyards closed at the end of the war.

The North Carolina Woman's Committee was established as a state agency during the war, headed by Laura Holmes Reilly of Charlotte. Inspired by ideas of the Progressive Movement, it registered women for many volunteer services, promoted increased food production and the elimination of wasteful cooking practices, helped maintain social services, worked to bolster morale of white and black soldiers, improved public health and public schools, and encouraged black participation in its programs. Members helped cope with the devastating Spanish flu epidemic that struck worldwide in late 1918, with very high fatalities. The committee was generally successful in reaching middle-class white and black women. It was handicapped by the condescension of male lawmakers, limited funding, and tepid responses from women on the farms and working-class districts.

By 1917–1919, because of disfranchisement of African Americans and establishment of a one-party state, North Carolina Democrats held powerful, senior positions in Congress, holding two of 23 major committee chairmanships in the Senate and four of 18 in the House, as well as the post of House majority leader. White Southerners controlled a block of votes and important chairmanships in Congress because, although they had disfranchised the entire black population of the South, they had not lost any congressional apportionment. With the delegation under control of the Democrats, they exercised party discipline. Their members gained seniority by being re-elected for many years. During the early decades of the 20th century, the Congressional delegation gained the construction of several major U.S. military installations, notably Fort Bragg, in North Carolina. President Woodrow Wilson, a fellow Democrat from the South who was elected due to the suppression of the Republican Party in the South, remained highly popular during World War I and was generally supported by the North Carolina delegation.

The state's road-building initiative began in the 1920s after the automobile became a popular mode of transportation.

=== Great Depression ===
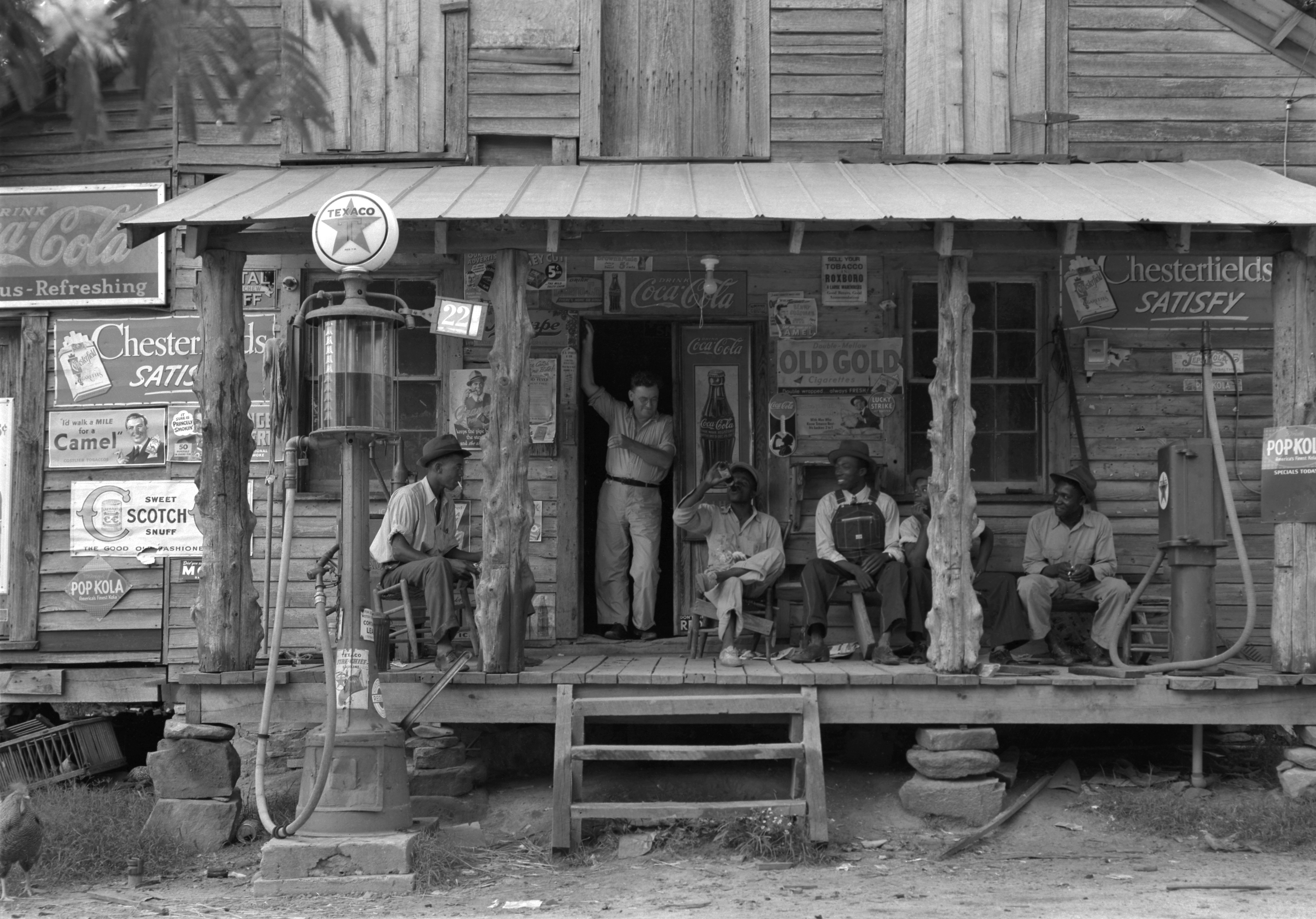
Country store in Gordonton, North Carolina, 1939

The state's farmers were badly hurt from late 1929 to early 1933, the early part of the Great Depression. When Franklin D Roosevelt became president in 1933, they benefited greatly by his New Deal programs. The tobacco program guaranteed a steady flow of relatively high income to farmers. Likewise the cotton program raised the prices farmers received for their crops. However, the farm programs primarily helped the owners of farms, rather than the sharecroppers. The textile industry in the Piedmont region continued to attract cotton mills relocating from the North, where unions had been effective in gaining better wages and working conditions.

=== World War II ===
Looking at the statistical data, historian Julian Pleasants finds that North Carolina ranked near the bottom in income, placing forty-fifth out of the forty-eight states. The cities were in fair shape thanks to factories for cigarettes, textiles and furniture. But rural North Carolina was where two-thirds lived and conditions were bad, typically with unpaved roads that were impassable in rainy weather. Rural electrification had begun but a third of the farms still lacked power, and only one in eight had a telephone. The state led the nation in draft rejections when Selective Service began testing all young men in 1940. The main cause was being a grade school dropout. Poor health was the second cause, especially teeth so bad that it was hard to eat. Furthermore many rural men had rickets, pellagra, or malnutrition.

World War II fundamentally modernized North Carolina, shifting it from a depressed rural, agrarian state to a growing industrial and military hub. Federal investment and military mobilization drove economic growth, even as the state's conservative politicians were reluctant to assist federal power. The war opened new but limited opportunities for women and African Americans, setting the stage for demands for recognition and equality that continue to shape North Carolina today.

About 366,000 volunteers and draftees, including 85,000 Blacks and 7,000 women, entered the armed forces from North Carolina; 70% became soldiers, 25% sailors, and 5% Marines and Coast Guard. Over 8,000 died. The warm climate allowed the military to set up over a hundred training camps that hosted two million recruits from every state. The Army's Fort Bragg and Marine Corps Base Camp Lejeune became famous. Off the Atlantic coast, in the zone known as "Torpedo Junction" off Cape Hatteras, German U-boats sank 80 Allied tankers and cargo ships in 1942. Belatedly the convoy system became operational in mid-1942 and provided safety.

Prosperity returned to the homefront in 1939-1942. Over $2 billion in war contracts went to the state, especially for camp construction, textiles, and ships. North Carolina supplied more uniforms than any other state. Unemployment ended as about a million workers were employed, with many women and white and black sharecroppers getting good jobs. Cities like Charlotte flourished while remote mountain hamlets and small villages joined the national economy and had their first taste of economic prosperity.

The North Carolina Shipbuilding Company was launched at the behest of the U.S. Maritime Commission decision to open a series of shipyards along the coasts. The South was favored because its economy needed stimulation and it had a large underutilized rural labor force. The opening of the shipyard in 1941, a subsidiary of a Virginia company, transformed Wilmington into the "Defense Capital of the State". By the time it closed in 1946 it had launched 126 Liberty ships and 117 of the larger Victory ships. They proved critical for transporting munitions to Europe and the Pacific. The shipyard employed upwards of 21,000 workers, including 1,600 women and 6,000 Blacks. The impact was to swell the local population from 33,000 to 50,000.

=== Postwar prosperity ===
Political scientist V. O. Key analyzed the state political culture in depth in the late 1940s, and concluded it was exceptional in the South for its "progressive outlook and action in many phases of life", especially in the realm of industrial development, commitment to public education, and a moderate-pattern segregation that was relatively free of the rigid racism found in the Deep South.

By 1950 nearly all farmsteads in the state were electrified thanks to TVA and Rural Electrification Administration (REA). By 1950, Great Smoky Mountains National Park which lies in both Tennessee and North Carolina, became the most visited park in the nation.

=== Progressive governors Hodges and Sanford ===
Progressive leaders, especially governors Luther H. Hodges (1954–1961) and Terry Sanford (1961–1965) advocated for modernization of education and the economy. They confronted a strong conservative faction.

Governor Hodges championed what he called "business progressivism." His modernization efforts included the new Department of Administration to streamline state government; industrial recruitment programs to diversify North Carolina's economy beyond agriculture and textiles; and upgrading roads and utilities. His most innovative action key was creating the nationally famous Research Triangle Park in 1959. It linked advanced academic research with inventive young entrepreneurs. To promote better education, Hodges increased funding for public schools and raised teacher salaries. He expanded the state's community college system and encouraged the University of North Carolina system.

However, Hodges faced resistance from rural conservatives who opposed increased state spending and federal involvement. Thanks to his business background and moderate approach on racial issues (he supported "separate but equal" rather than integration) he built coalitions across traditional political lines. For this work, Hodges is credited with leading North Carolina's dramatic transformation from one of the most impoverished states in the Union to one of its most prosperous.

Terry Sanford as governor 1961-1965 was more boldly progressive than Hodges on education and social issues. He won the Democratic nomination in 1960 after a bitter run-off against I. Beverly Lake Sr., a right-wing opponent of integration. As governor, Sanford's key accomplishment was enacting a sales tax increase to finance comprehensive public education enhancements, overcoming conservative anti-tax resistance. This program, called the "Quality Education Program," boosted educator salaries; decreased classroom overcrowding during the Baby Boom years; and upgraded facilities across the state. He established a statewide kindergarten program and created the North Carolina School of the Arts. He expanded higher education opportunities; increased university funding; and implemented the North Carolina Fund, an anti-poverty program that predated federal War on Poverty initiatives. He increased funding for the Research Triangle Park as it became a base for the state's evolution toward a knowledge-driven economy. He stressed that education must reach far beyond fundamental reading and writing skills in order to equip North Carolinians for full participation in a technology-oriented future.

National developments, especially the Cold War and the expanding Civil Rights Movement, significantly shaped the state's political agenda. When the national Democratic Party increasingly supported civil rights causes, Democratic voters started realigning their political loyalties, with conservatives and business moving toward the Republican Party. The transition gained momentum following 1964.

=== Civil Rights Movement ===
In 1931, the Negro Voters League was formed in Raleigh to press for voter registration. The city had an educated and politically sophisticated black middle class; by 1946 the League had succeeded in registering 7,000 black voters, an achievement in the segregated South, since North Carolina had essentially disfranchised blacks with provisions of a new constitution in 1899, excluding them from the political system and strengthening its system of white supremacy through Jim Crow laws.

The work of opposing racial segregation and demanding enforcement of constitutional civil rights for African Americans continued throughout the state. During World War II, Durham's Black newspaper, The Carolina Times, edited by Louis Austin, took the lead in promoting the "Double V" strategy among civil rights activists. The strategy was to energize blacks to fight victory abroad against the Germans and Japanese while fighting for victory at home against white supremacy and racial oppression. Activists demanded an end to racial inequality in education, politics, economics, and the armed forces.

In 1960, nearly 25% of the state residents were African American: 1,114,907 citizens who had been living without their full constitutional rights. African-American college students began the sit-in movement at the Woolworth's lunch counter in Greensboro on February 1, 1960, sparking a wave of sit-ins across the American South. They continued the Greensboro sit-ins sporadically for several months until, on July 25, African Americans were at last allowed to eat at Woolworth's. Integration of public facilities followed. During 1963 in Greenville, there was a boycott of Christmas lights, known as the Black Christmas boycott to protest the lack of hiring of black employees during the Christmas season.

Together with continued activism in states throughout the South and raising awareness throughout the country, African Americans' moral leadership gained the passage of the federal Civil Rights Act of 1964 and the Voting Rights Act of 1965 under President Lyndon B. Johnson. Throughout the state, African Americans began to participate fully in political life.

=== Late 20th century ===
In October 1973, Clarence Lightner was elected mayor of Raleigh, making history as the first popularly elected mayor of the city, the first African American to be elected mayor, and the first African American to be elected mayor in a white-majority city of the South. In 1992, the state elected Eva Clayton as its first African-American congressman since George Henry White in 1898.

In 1979, North Carolina ended the state eugenics program. Since 1929, the state Eugenics Board had deemed thousands of individuals "feeble-minded" and had them forcibly sterilized. The victims of the program were disproportionately minorities and the poor. In 2011, the state legislature debated whether the estimated 2,900 living victims of North Carolina's sterilization regime would be compensated for the harm inflicted upon them by the state; no action was taken.

In 1971, North Carolina ratified its third state constitution. A 1997 amendment to this constitution granted the governor veto power over most legislation.

In 1988, North Carolina gained its first professional sports franchise, the Charlotte Hornets of the National Basketball Association (NBA). The hornets team name stems from the American Revolutionary War, when British General Cornwallis described Charlotte as a "hornet's nest of rebellion." The Carolina Panthers of the National Football League (NFL) became based in Charlotte as well, with their first season being in 1995. The Carolina Hurricanes of the National Hockey League (NHL) moved to Raleigh in 1997, with their colors being the same as the NC State Wolfpack, who are also located in Raleigh.

During the 1990s, Charlotte became the nation's number two banking center, after New York City.

== 21st century ==
Historical population
Census	Pop.	Note	%±
1790	393,751		—
1800	478,103		21.4%
1810	556,526		16.4%
1820	638,829		14.8%
1830	737,987		15.5%
1840	753,419		2.1%
1850	869,039		15.3%
1860	992,622		14.2%
1870	1,071,361		7.9%
1880	1,399,750		30.7%
1890	1,617,949		15.6%
1900	1,893,810		17.1%
1910	2,206,287		16.5%
1920	2,559,123		16.0%
1930	3,170,276		23.9%
1940	3,571,623		12.7%
1950	4,061,929		13.7%
1960	4,556,155		12.2%
1970	5,082,059		11.5%
1980	5,881,766		15.7%
1990	6,628,637		12.7%
2000	8,049,313		21.4%
2010	9,535,483		18.5%
2020	10,439,388		9.5%
2023 (est.)	10,835,491		3.8%
Source: 1910–2020

Before World War II, North Carolina's economy relied heavily on tobacco, cigarettes, textiles, and furniture for its main economic drivers. By 2000 economic sectors such as technology, pharmaceuticals, banking, food processing, and vehicle parts started to emerge as main economic drivers. The main factors in this shift were globalization, the state's higher education system, national banking, the transformation of agriculture, and new companies moving to the state.

=== Recent times ===
Through the late 20th century and into the 21st century, North Carolina's population steadily increased as its economy grew, especially in finance and knowledge-based industries. This growth attracted people from places such as the North and Midwest, as well as the rest of the country and internationally. The number of workers in agriculture declined sharply because of mechanization, and the textile industry saw declines because of globalization and movement of jobs in that industry out of the country. Much of the growth in jobs and population increases happened in metropolitan areas of the Piedmont Crescent region, being in and around cities such as Charlotte, Raleigh, and Greensboro. Other urban areas of the state saw increases as well. With most growth occurring in or around cities, many of North Carolina's rural areas saw declines in population and growth. In 2015, North Carolina's population surpassed 10 million people.

== See also ==
- List of governors of North Carolina
  - List of colonial governors of North Carolina
  - Province of North Carolina
  - Colonial South and the Chesapeake
- History of the Southern United States
  - Black Belt in the American South
- List of historical societies in North Carolina
  - List of National Historic Landmarks in North Carolina
  - National Register of Historic Places listings in North Carolina

City timelines

- Timeline of Asheville, North Carolina
- Timeline of Charlotte, North Carolina
- Timeline of Durham, North Carolina
- Timeline of Fayetteville, North Carolina
- Timeline of Greensboro, North Carolina
- Timeline of Raleigh, North Carolina
- Timeline of Wilmington, North Carolina
- Timeline of Winston-Salem, North Carolina

== Bibliography ==
- Powell, William S. and Jay Mazzocchi, eds. Encyclopedia of North Carolina (2006) 1320pp; 2000 articles by 550 experts on all topics; ISBN 0-8078-3071-2. The best starting point for most research.

=== Surveys ===
- Butler, Lindley S., and Alan D. Watson, eds., The North Carolina Experience: An Interpretive and Documentary History (1984) 19 essays by historians and selected related primary sources.
- Crow; Jeffrey J. and Larry E. Tise, eds. Writing North Carolina History (1979) historiography
- Fleer; Jack D. North Carolina Government & Politics (1994) online; political science textbook
- Hawks; Francis L. History of North Carolina 2 vol 1857
- Kersey, Marianne M., and Ran Coble, eds., North Carolina Focus: An Anthology on State Government, Politics, and Policy, 2d ed., (Raleigh: North Carolina Center for Public Policy Research, 1989).
- Lefler; Hugh Talmage. A Guide to the Study and Reading of North Carolina History
- Lefler, Hugh Talmage, and Albert Ray Newsome, North Carolina: The History of a Southern State (1954, 1963, 1973), standard textbook
- Link, William A. North Carolina: Change and Tradition in a Southern State (2009), 481pp history by leading scholar
- Luebke, Paul. Tar Heel Politics: Myths and Realities (1990).
- Morse, J. (1797). "North Carolina". The American Gazetteer. Boston, Massachusetts: At the presses of S. Hall, and Thomas & Andrews. OL 23272543M.
- Powell William S. Dictionary of North Carolina Biography. Vol. 1, A-C; vol. 2, D-G; vol. 3, H-K. 1979–88.
- Powell, William S. Encyclopedia of North Carolina. (2006). ISBN 978-0-8078-3071-0.
- Powell, William S. North Carolina through Four Centuries (1989), standard textbook
- Ready, Milton. The Tar Heel State : a new history of North Carolina (U of South Carolina Press, 2020)
- Tise, Larry E., and Jeffrey J. Crow. New Voyages to Carolina: Reinterpreting North Carolina History. (U of North Carolina Press, 2017), historiography
- WPA Federal Writers' Project. North Carolina: A Guide to the Old North State. 1939. famous Works Progress Administration guide to every town

=== Race and gender ===
- Anderson, Eric. Race and Politics in North Carolina, 1872–1901 (1981).
- Anderson, Eric. "James O'Hara of North Carolina: Black Leadership and local government" in Howard N. Rabinowitz, ed. Southern Black Leaders of the Reconstruction Era (1982) 101–128.
- Barrett, John G. The Civil War in North Carolina (U of North Carolina Press, 1963)
- Beatty, Bess. “Lowells of the South: Northern Influences on the Nineteenth-Century North Carolina Textile Industry.” Journal of Southern History 53#1 1987, pp. 37–62. online
- Donaldson, Anthony M., Jr. "Waiting Is Not an Option: The Quest for Black Political Power in North Carolina, 1963–1981" (PhD dissertation, University of Florida| ProQuest Dissertations & Theses, 2019. 29374370).
- Gilmore; Glenda Elizabeth. Gender and Jim Crow: Women and the Politics of White Supremacy in North Carolina, 1896–1920 (1996) online
- Gershenhorn, Jerry. Louis Austin and The Carolina Times: A Life in the Long Black Freedom Struggle (University of North Carolina Press, 2018)
- Hagood, Margaret Jarman. Mothers of the South: Portraiture of the White Tenant Farm Woman 1939
- Hemmingway, Theodore. "Prelude to Change: Black Carolinians in the War Years, 1914–1920." Journal of Negro History 65.3 (1980): 212–227. online
- Perdue Theda. Native Carolinians: The Indians of North Carolina. Division of Archives and History, North Carolina Department of Cultural Resources, 1985.
- Seymour, Robert E. "Whites Only". (Judson, 1991). An account of the Civil Rights Movement in North Carolina, and churches' involvement in it (on both sides) in particular, by a white Baptist pastor who was a supporter of the movement. ISBN 0-8170-1178-1.
- Sims, Anastatia. The Power of Femininity in the New South: Women's Organizations and Politics in North Carolina, 1880-1930 (U of South Carolina Press, 1997) online
- Supple Smith, Margaret. North Carolina Women: Making History (1999)
- Taylor, Elizabeth A. "The Women's Suffrage Movement in North Carolina", North Carolina Historical Review, (January 1961): 45–62, and ibid. (April 1961): 173–89;
- Thuesen, Sarah Caroline. Greater than Equal: African American Struggles for Schools and Citizenship in North Carolina, 1919–1965 (The University of North Carolina Press, 2013)
- Weare; Walter B. Black Business in the New South: A Social History of the North Carolina Mutual Life Insurance Company (1993)

=== Localities ===
- Boyd William Kenneth. The Story of Durham. 1925.
- Lally, Kelly A. Historic Architecture of Wake County, North Carolina. Raleigh: Wake County Government, 1994. ISBN 0-9639198-0-6.
- Moore, Elisabeth Avery. "The Vanishing Frontier: Economic and Social Change in Western North Carolina, 1945-1970" (PhD dissertation, West Virginia University; ProQuest Dissertations & Theses, 2022. 29283505)
- Morland John Kenneth. Millways of Kent. (UNC 1958). in-depth local study
- Payne, Roger L. Place Names of the Outer Banks. Washington, North Carolina: Thomas A. Williams, 1985. ISBN 978-0-932705-01-3.
- Powell, William S. The First State University. 3rd ed. Chapel Hill: 1992.
- Powell, William S. North Carolina Gazetteer. Chapel Hill: 1968. Available as an electronic book with ISBN 0-8078-6703-9 from NetLibrary.
- Vickers, James. Chapel Hill: An Illustrated History. Chapel Hill: Barclay, 1985. ISBN 0-9614429-0-5.

=== Special topics ===
- Bishir, Catherine. North Carolina Architecture. Chapel Hill: UNC, 1990.
- Bost, Raymond M. "North Carolina Lutherans and the Tests of Time, 1803–2003." Concordia Historical Institute Quarterly. Sep2004, 77#3, pp. 138–153.
- Conser, Walter H. and Robert J. Cain, eds. Presbyterians in North Carolina (Univ Tennessee Press, 2012)
- King, William Eskridge. " The Era of Progressive Reform in Southern Education: The Growth of Public Schools in North Carolina, 1885-1970" (PhD dissertation, Duke University; ProQuest Dissertations & Theses, 1970. 7021)
- Powell, William S. North Carolina Fiction, 1734–1957: An Annotated Bibliography (1958)

=== Environment and geography ===
- Orr, Doug, and Alfred W. Stuart. The North Carolina Atlas: Portrait for a New Century (University of North Carolina Press, 2000) online
  - Clay, James W., Douglas Milton Orr, and Alfred W. Stuart. North Carolina Atlas: Portrait of a Changing Southern State (University of North Carolina Press, 1975), previous edition.
- Riggs, Stanley R. ed. The Battle for North Carolina's Coast: Evolutionary History, Present Crisis, and Vision for the Future (University of North Carolina Press; 2011) 142 pages
- Sawyer, Roy T. America's Wetland: An Environmental and Cultural History of Tidewater Virginia and North Carolina (University of Virginia Press; 2010) 248 pages; traces the human impact on the ecosystem of the Tidewater region.

=== Pre-1920 ===
- Beeby, James M. Revolt of the Tar Heels: The North Carolina Populist Movement, 1890–1901 (UP of Mississippi, 2008). 280 pp.
- Billings Dwight. Planters and the Making of a "New South": Class, Politics, and Development in North Carolina, 1865–1900. 1979.
- Bolton; Charles C. Poor Whites of the Antebellum South: Tenants and Laborers in Central North Carolina and Northeast Mississippi 1994
- Bradley, Mark L. Bluecoats and Tar Heels: Soldiers and Civilians in Reconstruction North Carolina (2010) 370 pp. ISBN 978-0-8131-2507-7
- Cathey, Cornelius O. Agricultural Developments in North Carolina, 1783–1860. 1956.
- Clayton, Thomas H. Close to the Land. The Way We Lived in North Carolina, 1820–1870. 1983.
- Ekirch, A. Roger "Poor Carolina": Politics and Society in Colonial North Carolina, 1729–1776 (1981)
- Escott Paul D., and Jeffrey J. Crow. "The Social Order and Violent Disorder: An Analysis of North Carolina in the Revolution and the Civil War". Journal of Southern History 52 (August 1986): 373–402.
- Escott Paul D., ed. North Carolinians in the Era of the Civil War and Reconstruction (U. of North Carolina Press, 2008) 307pp; essays by scholars on specialized topics
- Escott; Paul D. Many Excellent People: Power and Privilege in North Carolina, 1850–1900 (1985)
- Fenn, Elizabeth A. and Peter H. Wood. Natives and Newcomers: The Way We Lived in North Carolina Before 1770 (1983)
- Gilpatrick; Delbert Harold. Jeffersonian Democracy in North Carolina, 1789–1816 (1931)
- Griffin Richard W. "Reconstruction of the North Carolina Textile Industry, 1865–1885". North Carolina Historical Review 41 (January 1964): 34–53.
- Harris, William C. "William Woods Holden: in Search of Vindication." North Carolina Historical Review 1982 59(4): 354–372. ISSN 0029-2494 Governor during Reconstruction
- Harris, William C. William Woods Holden, Firebrand of North Carolina Politics. (1987). 332 pp.
- Johnson, Charles A. "The Camp Meeting in Ante-Bellum North Carolina". North Carolina Historical Review 10 (April 1933): 95–110.
- Johnson, Guion Griffis. Antebellum North Carolina: A Social History. 1937
- Kars, Marjoleine. Breaking Loose Together: The Regulator Rebellion in Pre-Revolutionary North Carolina (2002)
- Kousser, J. Morgan. "Progressivism-for middle-class whites only: North Carolina education, 1880–1910." Journal of Southern History 46.2 (1980): 169–194. online
- Knight, Edgar W. Public school education in North Carolina (Houghton Mifflin Company, 1916), a standard scholarly history.
- Kruman Marc W. Parties and Politics in North Carolina, 1836–1865. (1983).
- Leloudis, James L. Schooling the New South: Pedagogy, Self, and Society in North Carolina, 1880–1920 1996
- Lemmon, Sarah McCulloh. North Carolina's role in the First World War (1975) online
- McDonald, Forrest, and Grady McWhiney. "The South from Self-Sufficiency to Peonage: An Interpretation". American Historical Review 85 (December 1980): 1095–1118. in JSTOR
- McDonald Forrest, and Grady McWhiney. "The Antebellum Southern Herdsmen: A Reinterpretation". Journal of Southern History 41 (May 1975): 147–66. in JSTOR
- Morrill, James R. The Practice and Politics of Fiat Finance: North Carolina in the Confederation, 1783–1789. (1969)
- Newcomer, Mabel, Economic and Social History of Chowan County, North Carolina, 1880–1915 (1917)
- Nathans Sydney. The Quest for Progress: The Way We Lived in North Carolina, 1870–1920. (1983).
- Norton, Clarence Clifford. The Democratic Party in Ante-Bellum North Carolina, 1835–1861 (1930)
- O'Brien Gail Williams. The Legal Fraternity and the Making of a New South Community, 1848–1882. (1986).
- Opper Peter Kent. "North Carolina Quakers: Reluctant Slaveholders". North Carolina Historical Review 52 (January 1975): 37–58.
- Prather, H. Leon, Resurgent Politics and Educational Progressivism in the New South: North Carolina, 1890–1913. (1979), standard scholarly history
- Ramsey Robert W. Carolina Cradle. Settlement of the Northwest Carolina Frontier, 1747–1762. 1964.
- Joseph Carlyle Sitterson. The Secession Movement in North Carolina (1939) 285 pages
- Tolley, Kim, "Joseph Gales and Education Reform in North Carolina, 1799–1841," North Carolina Historical Review, 86 (Jan. 2009), 1–31.
- Louise Irby Trenholme; The Ratification of the Federal Constitution in North Carolina (1932)
- Watson Harry L. An Independent People: The Way We Lived in North Carolina, 1770–1820. (1983).
- Watson Harry L. Jacksonian Politics and Community Conflict: The Emergence of the Second Party System in Cumberland County, North Carolina (1981)
- Williams, Max R. "The Foundations of the Whig Party in North Carolina: A Synthesis and a Modest Proposal." North Carolina Historical Review 47.2 (1970): 115–129. online
- Woodward, C. Vann. Origins of the New South: 1877–1913 (1951) online

=== Since 1920 ===
- Abrams, Douglas Carl; Conservative Constraints: North Carolina and the New Deal (1992)
- Badger, Anthony J. Prosperity Road: The New Deal, Tobacco, and North Carolina (1980)
- Bell, John L., Jr. Hard Times: Beginnings of the Great Depression in North Carolina, 1929–1933. North Carolina Division of Archives and History, 1982.
- Christensen, Rob. The Paradox of Tar Heel Politics: The Personalities, Elections, and Events That Shaped Modern North Carolina (2008) online
- Clancy, Paul R. Just a Country Lawyer: A Biography of Senator Sam Ervin. (1974). Senator who helped to bring down Richard Nixon, but opposed the Civil Rights Movement
- Cooper, Christopher A., and H. Gibbs Knotts, eds. The New Politics of North Carolina (U. of North Carolina Press, 2008) ISBN 978-0-8078-5876-9
- Davis, Anita Price. North Carolina and World War II: A Documentary Portrait (McFarland, 2014) ISBN 978-0-7864-7984-9. See also online review
- Eamon, Tom. The Making of a Southern Democracy: North Carolina Politics from Kerr Scott to Pat Mc-Crory (U North Carolina Press, 2014), encyclopedic coverage from 1948 to 2012. .
- Gatewood, Willard B. Preachers, Pedagogues & Politicians: The Evolution Controversy in North Carolina, 1920–1927 1966
- Grimsley, Wayne. James B. Hunt: A North Carolina Progressive (2003) governor 1977–2000
- Grundy, Pamela. Learning to Win: Sports, Education, and Social Change in Twentieth-Century North Carolina 2001
- Key, V. O. Southern Politics in State and Nation (1951) pp 205-228 and passim; in-depth on voters.
- Lemmon, Sarah McCulloh. North Carolina's role in World War II (1969) online
- Luebke, Paul. Tar Heel Politics 2000 (1998)
- Milov, Sarah. "Little tobacco: The business and bureaucracy of tobacco farming in North Carolina, 1920–1965" (PhD dissertation, Princeton University; ProQuest Dissertations Publishing, 2013. 3597526).
- Odum, Howard W. Folk, Region, and Society: Selected Papers of Howard W. Odum, (1964).
- Parramore, Thomas C. Express Lanes and Country Roads: The Way We Lived in North Carolina, 1920–1970. (1983).
- Pearce, Neal R. The Border South States (1975), detailed coverage of politics pp 113-150.
- Pierce, Walter H. Trends in the development of agriculture in North Carolina (1965) online
- Pleasants, Julian M. Home Front: North Carolina During World War II (UP of Florida, 2017), 366 pp. online review
- Pope, Liston. Millhands and Preachers. (1942). A history of the 1929 Loray Mill strike in Gastonia, N.C., especially the role of the church.
- Puryear, Elmer L. Democratic Party Dissension in North Carolina, 1928–1936 (1962).
- Tilley Nannie May. The Bright-Tobacco Industry, 1860–1929. (1948).
- Tilley Nannie May. The R. J. Reynolds Tobacco Company. (1985).
- Tullos, Allen. Habits of Industry: White Culture and the Transformation of the Carolina Piedmont. (1989), based on interviews
- Wood; Phillip J. Southern Capitalism: The Political Economy of North Carolina, 1880–1980 (1986)

=== Primary sources ===
- Butler, Lindley S., and Alan D. Watson, eds., The North Carolina Experience: An Interpretive and Documentary History 1984, essays by historians and selected related primary sources.
- Claiborne, Jack, and William Price, eds. Discovering North Carolina: A Tar Heel Reader (1991).
- Jones, H. G. North Carolina Illustrated, 1524–1984 (1984)
- Lefler, Hugh. North Carolina History Told by Contemporaries (numerous editions since 1934)
- Salley, Alexander S. ed. Narratives of Early Carolina, 1650–1708 (1911)
- Wolfram, Walt, and Jeffrey Reaser, eds. Talkin' Tar Heel: How Our Voices Tell the Story of North Carolina (UNC Press, 2014)
- Woodmason Charles. The Carolina Backcountry on the Eve of the Revolution. 1953.
- Yearns, W. Buck and John G. Barret, eds. North Carolina Civil War Documentary (1980)

=== Primary sources: governors and political leaders ===
- Cheney, Jr., ed., John L. North Carolina Government, 1585–1979: A Narrative and Statistical History (Raleigh: Department of the Secretary of State, 1981)
- Hodges, Luther H. Businessman in the Statehouse: Six Years as Governor of North Carolina 1962; memoirs
- Memoirs of W. W. Holden (1911) complete text
- Holden, William Woods. The Papers of William Woods Holden. Vol. 1: 1841–1868. Horace Raper and Thornton W. Mitchell, ed. Raleigh, Division of Archives and History, Dept. of Cultural Resources, 2000. 457 pp.
- North Carolina Manual, published biennially by the Department of the Secretary of State since 1941.
