= Woccon language =

Extinct Catawban language of North Carolina

Woccon
- Native to: United States
- Region: North Carolina; possibly later New York
- Ethnicity: Woccon, possibly Waccamaw
- Extinct: early 18th century
- Revival: 2020s
- Language family: Siouan-Catawban: Catawban; Woccon

Language codes
- ISO 639-3: xwc
- Glottolog: wocc1242
- Linguasphere: 64-ABA-aa
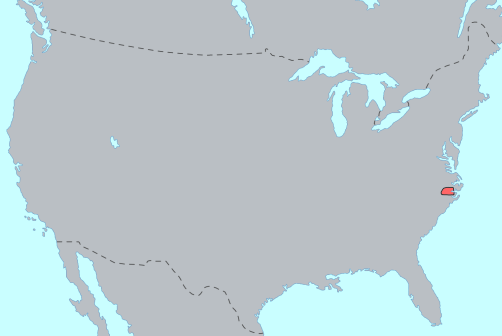
- Original distribution of the Woccon language

Woccon was one of two attested Catawban languages of what is now the Eastern United States. It is attested only in a vocabulary of 143 words, printed in a 1709 compilation by English colonist John Lawson of Carolina. The Woccon people that Lawson encountered have been considered by some scholars, including John R. Swanton, to have possibly been a late subdivision of the Waccamaw. Contemporary linguists and researchers have been unable to resolve whether Woccon directly represents the language of the historic Waccamaw people, as opposed to representing a related Catawban language.

The Woccon are believed to have been decimated as a people during the Tuscarora War in the Carolinas with English colonists in 1713. Survivors were likely absorbed into the Tuscarora, an Iroquoian-speaking people, who subsequently migrated north to New York, settling with the five nations of the Haudenosaunee Confederacy by 1722 and being accepted as the sixth. Under these pressures, the Woccon language is believed to have become extinct in the eighteenth century. Thus, some descendants of Woccon ancestry possibly survive among the Tuscarora, including Canada where many Haudenosaunee were forced to flee to after the American Revolutionary War.

== Documentation ==
The Woccon language is poorly attested, with all known material originating from a single colonial source. The primary record is a 143-word list compiled by John Lawson in 1711, which includes vocabulary from Tuskeruro, Pampticough, and Woccon. Additional attestations come from an 1806 list by Adelung and Vater, which includes 16 German-Woccon glosses. However, researchers have noted that several terms in this list appear to duplicate entries from Lawson and may reflect confusion between Woccon and Catawba terms.

The linguistic data suffers from inconsistencies and inaccuracies. Lawson, for example, claimed that Woccon lacked "l" and "f" sounds, yet included such letters in his transcriptions. The language documentation was recorded by non-native speakers and filtered through colonial perspectives, further complicating efforts to assess accuracy. Scholars working with these records have pointed out that the limited and inconsistent nature of the data makes identifying grammatical patterns or establishing definitive linguistic relationships extremely difficult. As such, Woccon remains a fragmentarily attested and ambiguously classified language within the Catawban.

== Revival efforts ==
In 2021 the Living Tongues Institute for Endangered Languages assisted the Cape Fear Band of Skarure and Woccon Indians to build a 'Living Dictionary' for Woccon as part of an effort to revive the language. However, this group is not state-recognized by North Carolina or federally recognized by the Bureau of Indian Affairs as being descended from the Cape Fear, Tuscarora, or the Waccamaw. The group's assertions of lineage have been noted by EBSCO Information Services to be unverified by credible historians or anthropologists. The state-recognized Waccamaw Siouan Indians of North Carolina and the Waccamaw Indian People of South Carolina were not included in the Living Dictionary project initiated by the Living Tongues Institute during the process of assembling the revitalization dictionary.

Since 2023, the state-recognized Waccamaw Siouan are undertaking efforts to revive the Woccon language, which they identify as the ancestral language of their community. In partnership with linguists from the University of North Carolina Wilmington, they have engaged in a reclamation project using John Lawson's colonial-era word list. The project incorporates decolonial methodologies that prioritize Indigenous epistemologies, reject traditional models of scholarly ownership, and center tribal authority over linguistic decisions. As part of this initiative, the Waccamaw have advocated renaming the historic language to “Waccamaw Siouan,” in order to reflect their contemporary identity and attempts to assert historical and cultural continuity. The Waccamaw Siouan’s past position has included public proclamations declining to recognize others as tribal entities or descendants of the historic Waccamaw people, including the state-recognized Waccamaw Indian People of South Carolina. This stance has contributed to the tribe’s claims of exclusivity over the Woccon language and its revitalization.

While some scholars, such as John R. Swanton, have historically suggested that Woccon and Waccamaw may refer to the same people or language, this identification remains a matter of scholarly debate. The historical record is limited and contains inconsistencies in attribution, terminology, and linguistic content. As noted by linguists and researchers involved in the Waccamaw Siouan revival project, the question of whether Woccon directly represents the language of the historic Waccamaw people, as opposed to being a related language, remains academically unresolved. As such, the current revival efforts proceed under a framework that emphasizes tribal sovereignty and cultural continuity, even as the linguistic classification of the language remains inconclusive.
