= Pedee people =

Indigenous people of the Southeast United States

Pedee Pee Dee, Peedee
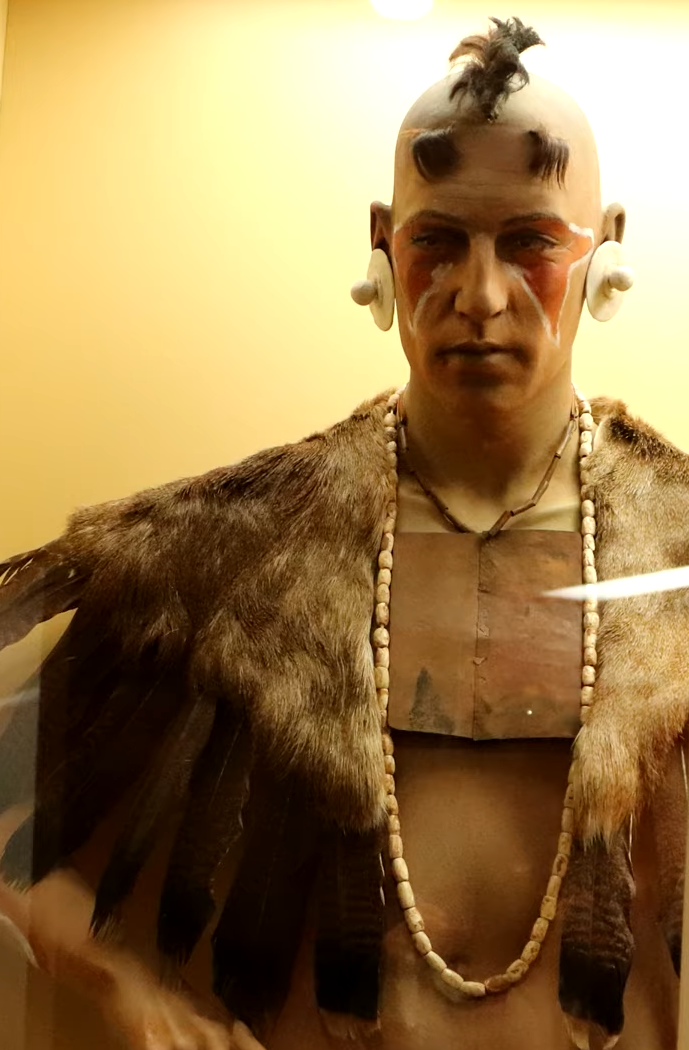
- Archeological reconstruction of a Pedee man in ceremonial dress at Town Creek Museum in Mount Gilead, NC.

Total population
- 600 (1600 CE, est.)
- Merged into Catawba Nation

Regions with significant populations
- United States ( North Carolina, South Carolina)

Languages
- Unclassified language, possibly Siouan-Catawban

Related ethnic groups
- Catawba, Winyah, Waccamaw

The Pedee people, also Pee Dee and Peedee, are a historic Indigenous people of the Southeastern Woodlands within the Carolinas. Historically, their population was concentrated in the Piedmont of present-day South Carolina. The Pedee are among the best-known Native American tribes in South Carolina, as variants of their name are preserved in the Pee Dee River, the Little Pee Dee River, and the Pee Dee region of the state. Most of the Pedee, together with the Cheraw, had incorporated with the Catawba people by 1746, forming part of the Esaw Confederacy. Some of their descendants are recognized as citizens of the Catawba Nation in Rock Hill, South Carolina. The Catawba Nation is the only federally recognized tribe within South Carolina today.

In the 21st century, South Carolina has state-recognized four tribes and one heritage group, that claim descent from the historic Pedee people. Presently none of these organizations are recognized by the Bureau of Indian Affairs. The federally recognized Lumbee Tribe of North Carolina has claimed descent from several historic Indigenous people of the Southeastern Woodlands, including the Cheraw and Pedee. The legitimacy of such claims has been questioned by some anthropologists and historians.

== Etymology ==
The precise meaning of the name Pedee is unknown. The name has many variations, having been alternatively spelled as Pee Dee, PeeDee, Peedee, Peedees, Peadea, and Pidee. In early Spanish accounts the name is rendered, Vehidi. There has been contention among historians regarding which orthography is the more proper rendering of the name. Traditionally, there was speculation that an early trader, Patrick Daley, carved his initials, P.D., on trees along a trail within the vicinity of the modern Pee Dee River, leading to the region and river's present name, potentially being imposed also onto the Indigenous tribe. However, some scholars and writers have disagreed with this theory. In the early twentieth century, anthropologist Frank Speck suggested that the name might derive from the Catawban word pi'ri, meaning "something good," or pi'here, meaning "smart", "expert", or "capable". Linguist Blair A. Rudes suggested that variants of the tribe's name may have etymologically originated from a Catawban language.

== Language ==
The Pedee language was extinct by the 19th century and remains unclassified. Although no Pedee words were ever documented, some historians and scholars like James Mooney and John R. Swanton have suggested that Pedee may have belonged to the Siouan-Catawban family, based on the tribe’s historical associations with neighboring Siouan-speaking peoples. However, historian Charles M. Hudson has argued that Mooney and Swanton's assumptions of linguistic affinity are based largely on political alliances formed amid the disruptions of European colonization and are therefore unreliable indicators of the original linguistic affiliations of groups such as the Pedee, for who no direct linguistic evidence survives.

== History ==
=== Precontact ===
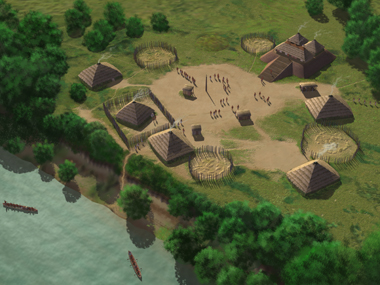
Artists conception of Town Creek Indian Mound during the late Town Creek-early Leak phases circa 1350 CE.

The Pee Dee culture is an archaeological culture spanning 1000 to 1500 CE. It is divided into the Teal phase (1000–1200), Town Creek phase (1200–1400), and Leak phase (1400–1500). The Pee Dee were part of the South Appalachian Mississippian culture that developed in the region as early as 980 CE, extending into present-day North Carolina and Tennessee. They participated in a widespread trade network that stretched from Georgia to South Carolina, eastern Tennessee, and the mountain and Piedmont regions of North Carolina.

The Pee Dee culture had developed as a distinct culture by 980 CE and thrived in the Pee Dee River region of present-day North and South Carolina during the pre-Columbian era. As an example, the Town Creek Indian Mound site in western North Carolina was occupied from about 1150 to 1400 CE.

Town Creek Indian Mound in Montgomery County, North Carolina is a proto-historic Pee Dee culture site. Extensive archeological research for 50 years since 1937 at the Town Creek Indian Mound and village site in western North Carolina near the border with South Carolina has provided insights into their culture. The mound and village site has been designated as a National Historic Landmark.

=== 16th century ===
Around 1550, the Pedee migrated from the lower Pee Dee River of the Atlantic Coastal Plain to the upper Pee Dee River of the Piedmont and remained there for about a century. They displaced local hill tribes, such as the Saponi, who resettled the region when the Pedee left. Historian Charles M. Hudson believes their migration may have been an effort to avoid Spanish slave raids along South Carolina's coast. These 16th-century Pedee practiced head flattening, as did the neighboring Waxhaw. In 1567, Spanish explorers encountered the village Vehidi on the Pee Dee River, believed to be a Pedee settlement.

=== 17th century ===
In 1600, the population of Pedee people was estimated to be 600. Europeans, mostly from the British Isles, began settling in South Carolina in large numbers in the 17th and early 18th century. The English established a trading post at Euauenee or Saukey in 1716 to trade with the Pedee and Waccamaw. The Winyah and Cape Fear Indians migrated from the Atlantic Coast up the Pee Dee River to the trading post.

In 1711, the Tuscarora War broke out in North Carolina, and South Carolina tribes joined in the fighting. In 1712, Pedee warriors, along with the Cheraw, Saxapahaw, Winyah, and Cape Fear Indians, served in British Captain John Bull's company to fight alongside the British against the Tuscarora and helped defeat them. As a result, most of the Tuscarora left the area and migrated north, reaching present-day New York and Ontario to join the related Haudenosaunee Confederacy of Iroquois tribes.

In 1715, English mapmakers recorded a Pedee village on the west bank of the Pee Dee River's central course.

The political relationships formed between the Pedee and other tribes in the area at this time carried over into their alliances of the Yamasee War. The Yamasee War of 1715–1717 resulted in major changes among the Southeastern tribes.

In 1737, the Pedee tribe petitioned South Carolina for a parcel of land to live upon. They, along with a band of Natchez were moved to a 100-acre (0.40 km^{2}) parcel provided by James Coachman in 1738. This land was in Berkeley County, along the Edisto River.

In the 1740s, the Pedee, along with the Cheraw, Yuchi, Natchez, and Cape Fear Indians, were known as "settlement Indians," by South Carolinian English settlers. Anthropologists James Mooney and John R. Swanton both wrote that in 1744 the Natchez and Pedee attacked and killed several Catawba people, so the Catawba drove them into European settlements. Mooney wrote of the Pedee that, "In 1746 they and the Sara are mentioned as two small tribes, which had been long incorporated with the Catawba. They were restless under the connection, however, and again Governor Glen had to interfere to prevent their separation." Like neighboring tribes during this era, the Pedee owned African-American slaves.

In 1751, at an intertribal conference in Albany, New York, the Pedee were recorded as being a small tribe living among European colonists. In 1752, Catawba envoys encouraged the Pedee to settle with their tribe. Governor John Glen spoke to Catawba leader King Haigler on May 29, 1755, and said South Carolina had "persuaded the Charraws, Waccamaws, and some of the Pedees to join you [the Catawba]." When Cherokee killed Pedee and Waccamaw people in 1755, they were still living in European settlements. This 1755 mention was the second-to-last historical record of the Pedee people until the 20th century.

=== 19th century ===
Swanton wrote, "In 1808 White neighbors remembered when as many as 30 Pedee and Cape Fear Indians lived in their old territories," but by then "the Pedee and Cape Fear tribes were represented by one half-breed woman."

Historian William James Rivers wrote in 1885 that the Pedee, along with many other tribes, were "utterly extirpated." However, some survivors may have found refuge with the Catawba, who lived near the border of South Carolina and North Carolina at the time.

== Descendants ==
Location of the Catawba Reservation, in York County, South Carolina.

The Pedee were adopted into the multi-ethnic Catawba Confederacy in the 18th century, and the modern Catawba descend from the merger of the Esaw, Cheraw, Pedee, and other local tribes. Scholar Ives Goddard wrote the Saraw dialect of Catawba presumably descends from the Cheraw, who were once located on the Pee Dee River. The Catawba Indian Nation is a federally recognized tribe in South Carolina.

=== Claimed descent ===
The federally recognized Lumbee Tribe of North Carolina claims connection to various historic Indigenous peoples of the Southeastern Woodlands, including the Pedee and Cheraw, who once lived along Pee Dee River. These claims has been subject to scrutiny by anthropologists, historians, and other federally recognized tribes.

==== State-recognized entities ====
The State of South Carolina has acknowledged four state-recognized tribes, and one state-recognized group, who identify as being Pedee descendants. The state-recognized tribes are:

- Pee Dee Indian Nation of Upper South Carolina, Little Rock, South Carolina (state-recognized in 2005), 532 members (2008), living primarily in Dillon and Marlboro counties;
- Pee Dee Indian Tribe of South Carolina, McColl, South Carolina (state-recognized in 2006).
- Beaver Creek Indian Tribe (also known as the Beaver Creek Indians), Salley, South Carolina (state-recognized in 2006).
  - Pee Dee Indian Nation of Beaver Creek, Neeses, South Carolina (split from Beaver Creek Indian Tribe in 1999, state-recognized as heritage group in 2007).
- Santee Indian Organization, who claim Pedee heritage in addition to Santee, Holly Hill, South Carolina (state-recognized in 2006).
