= Indigenous peoples of South Carolina =

The Indigenous peoples of South Carolina, commonly known as Indigenous South Carolinians or Native South Carolinians, are Native American nations and peoples Indigenous to the geographic area within the current boundaries of South Carolina before and after European colonization of the Americas. According to the 2020 U.S. Census, 24,300 people living in South Carolina self-identified as being Native American.

Today the state has one federally recognized tribe and ten state-recognized tribes.

== Federally recognized tribe ==
The only federally recognized tribe headquartered in South Carolina today is the Catawba Indian Nation.

== Federally recognized tribes with historical connections to South Carolina ==
Warfare forced some Indigenous peoples out of South Carolina. Then, due to Indian Removal in the mid-19th century, most Native peoples were forcibly removed from the state to Indian Territory. These removed tribes are still consulted since their ancestors are connected to archaeological sites within the state.

These tribes include the following.

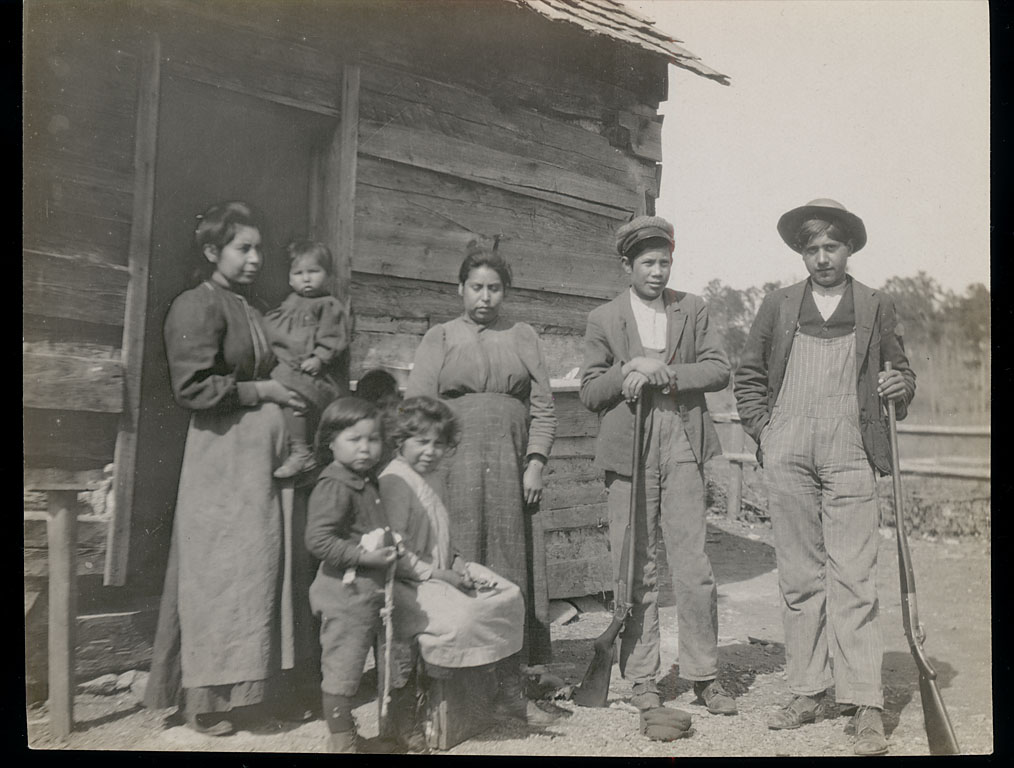
Catawba family in South Carolina, 1908

- Absentee-Shawnee Tribe of Indians of Oklahoma
- Alabama-Quassarte Tribal Town
- Catawba Indian Nation
- Cherokee Nation
- Chickasaw Nation
- Eastern Band of Cherokee Indians of North Carolina
- Eastern Shawnee Tribe of Oklahoma
- Kialegee Tribal Town
- Miccosukee Tribe of Indians of Florida
- Muscogee (Creek) Nation
- Seminole Nation of Oklahoma
- Seminole Tribe of Florida
- Shawnee Tribe
- Thlopthlocco Tribal Town
- Tuscarora Nation of New York
- United Keetoowah Band of Cherokee Indians in Oklahoma

== State-Recognized tribes ==
South Carolina recognizes tribes that are not federally recognized. The South Carolina Department of Archives and History states, "At the state level of recognition, tribal governments are equal to county governments." State-recognized tribes in South Carolina are as follows.

1. Beaver Creek Indians
2. Eastern Cherokee, Southern Iroquois and United Tribes of South Carolina
3. Edisto Natchez Kusso Tribe of South Carolina, also known as Edisto Natchez-Kusso Indians (Four Holes Indian Organization)
4. Pee Dee Indian Nation of Upper South Carolina
5. Pee Dee Indian Tribe, formerly Pee Dee Indian Tribe of South Carolina and Pee Dee Indian Association
6. Piedmont American Indian Association, also Piedmont American Indian Association Lower Eastern Cherokee Nation
7. Santee Indian Organization, formerly White Oak Indian Community
8. Sumter Tribe of Cheraw Indians
9. Waccamaw Indian People
10. Wassamasaw Tribe of Varnertown Indians

== History ==
Upon the arrival of Spanish explorers in the South Carolina region, numerous Native American tribes experienced significant population decline as a result of smallpox transmission. European settlers exterminated South Carolina’s indigenous population, driven by white supremacist ideology and racist doctrines including Manifest Destiny. Subsequently, South Carolina's Native American tribes were forcibly relocated to Oklahoma pursuant to the Indian Removal Act enacted during Andrew Jackson's administration.

== See also ==
- History of South Carolina
