= Waccamaw =

Native American people in the Carolinas

Regions with significant populations
- US (North Carolina, South Carolina)

Languages
- unattested, possibly a Catawban language, perhaps closely related to Woccon

Religion
- Indigenous religion

Related ethnic groups
- Winyaw, Catawba

The Waccamaw people were an Indigenous people of the Southeastern Woodlands, who lived in villages along the Waccamaw and Pee Dee rivers in North and South Carolina in the 18th century.

== Name ==
The meaning of the name Waccamaw is unknown. Francisco of Chicora, a 16th-century Indian man kidnapped by Spanish colonists, wrote it as Guacaya.

== Language ==
The Waccamaw language was not recorded and remains unattested. The language likely belonged to the Catawban language family. English explorer John Lawson published a 143-word vocabulary of the possibly related Woccon language in 1709.

== History ==
=== Precontact ===
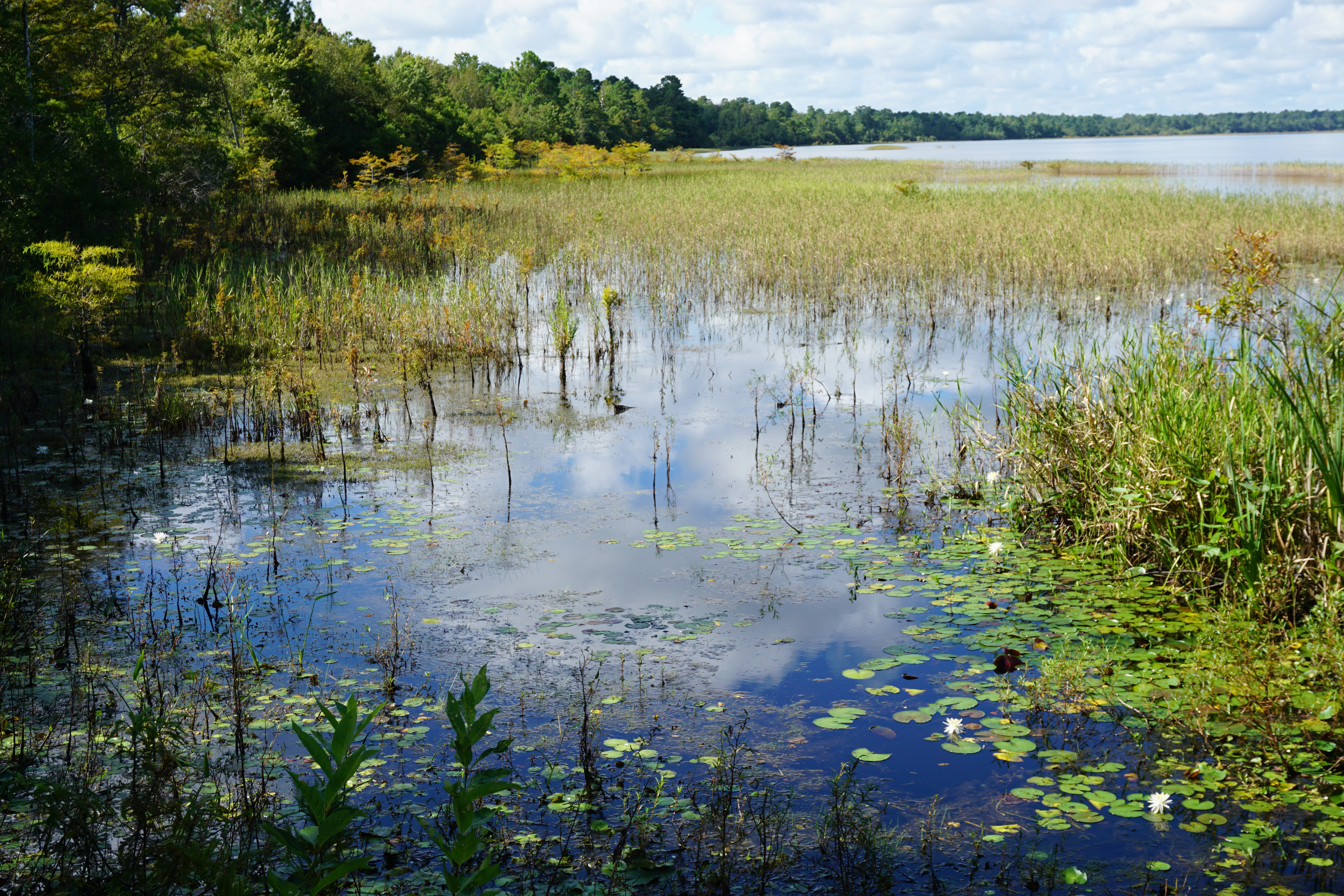
Wetlands at Lake Waccamaw State Park

The Indians of the Waccamaw homeland have lived in sedentary towns since at least 3,000 to 500 BP. (Note: Before Present) Maize rapidly became a staple crop in the region. Large countries began to form during the Mississippian period, which first started in the area between 1150 and 1200 AD. Indian tribes neighboring the Waccamaw included the Sewee, Santee, Sampit (Sampa), Winyah, and Pedee.

=== 16th century ===
According to ethnographer John R. Swanton, the Waccamaw may have been one of the first Indian tribes visited by the Spanish conquerors in the 16th century. Within the second decade of the 16th century, Francisco Gordillo and Pedro de Quexos captured and enslaved several Native Americans transporting them to the island of Hispaniola, where they had plantations. Most died within two years, although they were supposed to have been returned to the mainland.

One of the Native men kidnapped by the Spanish in 1521, Francisco de Chicora was baptized and learned Spanish. He worked for Lucas Vázquez de Ayllón. The explorer took him to Spain. Chicora told the court chronicler Peter Martyr about more than 20 Indigenous nations who lived in present-day South Carolina, among which he mentioned the "Chicora" and the "Duhare." Their tribal territories comprised the northernmost regions of Spanish colonial knowledge at the time.

Swanton argued that Chicora was referring to the peoples who became known as the Waccamaw and the Cape Fear Indians, respectively.

=== 18th century ===
European contact decimated the Waccamaw. Having no natural immunity to endemic Eurasian infectious diseases, such as smallpox and measles, the Waccamaw, like many southeastern Native peoples, had high mortality rates from the new diseases. The 1715 Carolina colonial census listed their population as 610 total, with 210 men.

By the early 18th century, the Cheraw tried to recruit the Waccamaw to support the Yamasee and other tribes against English colonists during the Yamasee War in 1715. Escaped slaves also gave intel to the Waccamaw tribe about the English colonists, which caused them to join the war. The Cheraw made peace with the English.

The English colonists founded a trading post in Euaunee, "the Great Bluff," in 1716. The 1720 census recorded that they had 100 warriors. The Waccamaw engaged in a brief war against the South Carolina colony in 1720, and 60 Waccamaw men, women, and children were either killed or captured by the colonists as a result.

==== Adoption by the Catawba ====
In 1755, John Evans noted in his journal that Cherokee and Natchez warriors killed some Waccamaw and Pedee "in the white people’s settlements." The same year, Governor James Glen informed Catawba chief King Haigler that the South Carolina colony had played a role in persuading the Cheraw, Waccamaw, and Pedee to join the Catawba.

== Population ==
While the Waccamaw were never populous, the arrival of settlers and their diseases in the 16th century resulted in devastating population loss and dispersal. Anthropologist James Mooney estimated the 1600s population of the "Waccamaw, Winyaw, Hook, &c" at 900 people, while the 1715 census records only one remaining Waccamaw village with a total population of 106 people, 36 of them men.

== State-recognized tribes ==
In the later 19th century, the ancestors of the State-recognized tribe claiming descent from the historic Waccamaw, known as the "Waccamaw Siouan Indians", cultivated corn, tobacco and cotton as commodity crops, as well as swine, oxen, poultry, and sheep, similarly to yeomen among the neighboring African-American freedmen and European-Americans. They slowly sold off their land due to rising taxes and debt, and increasingly turned to wage labor by the end of the century. Men collected turpentine from pine trees to supplement their income, while women grew cash crops, including tobacco and cotton, and worked as domestic laborers or farmhands. In 1910, they organized a council to oversee community issues. A school funded by Columbus County to serve their children opened in 1934. At the time, public education was still racially segregated in the state. Before this, they had been required to send their children to schools for African Americans.

North Carolina recognized the Waccamaw Siouan Tribe of North Carolina in 1971. The community is centered in Bladen and Columbus counties, North Carolina. They have unsuccessfully tried to gain federal recognition. They hold membership on the NC Commission of Indian Affairs as per NCGS 143B-407, and incorporated as a 501(c)(3) organization in 1977. Lumbee Legal Services, Inc., represents the Waccamaw Siouan Tribe in its administrative process for seeking federal recognition.

In 2005 South Carolina recognized the Waccamaw Indian People, a 501(c)(3) nonprofit organization in Conway, South Carolina. with an office in Aynor, South Carolina.

Both organizations claim to descend from the historic Waccamaw people.

== Unrecognized organization ==
The Waccamaw Sioux Indian Tribe of Farmers Union is an unrecognized tribe based in Clarkton, North Carolina, that incorporated as a nonprofit organization in 2001.

== See also ==
- Catawba Trail
- Chowanoc
- Congaree
- Coree
- Cusabo
  - Escamacu
  - Ittiwan
  - Kiawah
  - Wando
- Eno
- Guale
- Haudenosaunee
- Muscogee
- Shawnee
- Tuscarora
- Wateree
- Waxhaw
- Westo
- Yuchi
