= Santee (South Carolina) =

Total population
- 80-85 (1715)

Regions with significant populations
- On Santee River near present-day Santee, South Carolina.

Languages
- Siouan-Catawban

Religion
- Native American religion

Related ethnic groups
- Catawba, Etiwan, Congaree

The Santee were a historic tribe of Native Americans that once lived in South Carolina within the counties of Clarendon and Orangeburg, along the Santee River. The Santee were a small tribe even during the early eighteenth century and were primarily centered in the area of the present-day town of Santee, South Carolina. Their settlement along the Santee River has since been dammed and is now called Lake Marion. The Santee Indian Organization, a state-recognized tribe within South Carolina claim descent from the historic Santee people but are not presently federally recognized by the Bureau of Indian Affairs.

== Etymology ==
Santee
- (unattested)
- Native to: United States
- Region: South Carolina
- Ethnicity: Santee
- Extinct: (date missing)
- Language family: Siouan-Catawban?: Catawban?; Santee

Language codes
- ISO 639-3: None (mis)
- Glottolog: None

While few words of the Santee language have been preserved, scholars like John R. Swanton, have historically maintained that there is little doubt that the tribe once spoke a Siouan-Catawban language. Frank Speck, a prominent anthropologist and professor at the University of Pennsylvania during the early twentieth century, suggested that the name Santee derived from iswaⁿ´ti, Catawban for 'the river' or 'the river is there'.

The tribe has sometimes been confused with the Santee Sioux, another Siouan-Catawban speaking people primarily situated within the Dakotas, Minnesota, and Manitoba, Canada, due to the similarity of their names.

== History ==
The Santee people's earliest documented presence with a high degree of certainty can be traced back to the early seventeenth century, specifically through the accounts of Captain Francisco Fernandez de Eçija. Eçija, a Spaniard dispatched from St. Augustine, Florida, on two separate occasions in 1605 and 1609 searched for an English colony rumored to be in the Carolinas but failed in both instances to find any evidence of English settlement. During his missions, Eçija did, however, document the presence of the Santee people living along the modern-day Santee River, providing the earliest known documentation on the tribe's geographic location.

On June 20, 1672, Anthony Ashley Cooper, 1st Earl of Shaftesbury, wrote to the prominent Englishman, Captain Maurice Mathews, acknowledging that the Santee people had recently chosen Mathews as their cassique and approved his decision to first seek approval from the Governor and Council before accepting the position. On January 15, 1675, Mathews submitted a report to the Council, indicating that the Santee people had approached him with a request for guidance in selecting a location to establish a town. Mathews subsequently directed them to establish their settlement on the banks of Wadboo Creek, situated directly across the Cooper River. Mathews served as the overseer of Mepkin Plantation, a substantial estate spanning 3,000 acres situated along the Western Branch of the Cooper River, directly opposite the present-day location of Moncks Corner, South Carolina. This plantation is thought to have either encompassed or was in immediate proximity to the location of the Santee town.

In 1700, the Santee were visited by English explorer, John Lawson who found their towns, which he referred to as plantations, extending for many miles along the Santee River. At the time of Lawson's visit their warriors were at war with the Winyah near the coast. Lawson describe the tribe's main settlement as being near several burial mounds, including the Fort Watson Mound. Lawson described encountering King of the Santee as well as the chief doctor of the tribe, in addition to other tribal members, including a hunter and his wife. Later, he and his party spent the night in three cabins at the village of Hickerau, or Black House, near modern Summerton, South Carolina. The following day the party traveled to a temporary hunting encampment located between this village and the High Hills of Santee, where they met and hired a guide referred to as Santee Jack. Jack and his wife escorted Lawson and his party to a town of Congaree people, thought to be located near present-day Camden, South Carolina.

During the Tuscarora War the Santee furnished Anglo-Irish soldier, John Barnwell with a contingent of their warriors for his Tuscarora campaign between 1711 and 1712, but just a few years later during the Yamasee War fought against the colonists. In late 1716, the English along with the Etiwan and Cusabo, tribes that had remained allied with colonists, captured the entirety of the Santee tribe, lodging them in jail within the city of Charleston, South Carolina. It was discovered that some among them were Congaree and that three were Etiwan wives of Santee men with children who were considered to be Etiwan by matriarchal descent. Eventually, the Santee men captured at two Santee villages on Santee River were shipped to the West Indies to be sold as slaves, with the women and children of the village being delivered to the Etiwan tribe as slaves.

In 1715, just prior to hostilities, a census recorded the Santee population as consisting of two villages with forty-three men. Traditionally, it was widely believed that the tribe had been completely annihilated as a result of the Yamasee War, influenced by a statement from the British Public Record Office suggesting their extinction before 1716. However, 20th-century historians, notably Chapman J. Milling, provided evidence that some Santee individuals had indeed survived the war. This evidence was corroborated by a December 10, 1716 record documenting a violent encounter in which a few Santee were involved in the murder of colonists, leading to their capture and subsequent confession to the additional murder of two Catawba individuals, indicating the survival of at least small Santee population. Some historians have speculated that there may have been families of mixed Santee heritage still living during the mid eighteenth century. This speculation is based on an October 26, 1766 notice in the South Carolina Gazette. A notice describes a man named Simon Flowers as an American Indian or Mustee, aged thirty-six, born at Santee River. He had distinctive facial tattoos, which he mentioned were also applied to his siblings by their father during their childhood. Flowers indicated that he was a free person of color and that his family still resided along the Santee River.

== Governance and culture ==
Explorer John Lawson noted a distinct governance system among the Santee, setting them apart from neighboring tribes. Their nation was characterized by a form of despotism, where the chief held absolute authority, including the power of life and death over his people. This authoritative practice was inherited hereditarily from the previous chief. Distinguished members of the Santee adorned themselves with robes crafted from feathers, while other garments and sashes were often woven from animal hair. The tribe utilized provision houses, raised on posts and coated with clay, for storing their corn, a practice shared with several other Southeastern tribes.

=== Burial customs ===
Notably, Santee rulers were interred atop mounds constructed in accordance with their status within the tribe, with a roof supported by poles sheltering their graves from the elements.

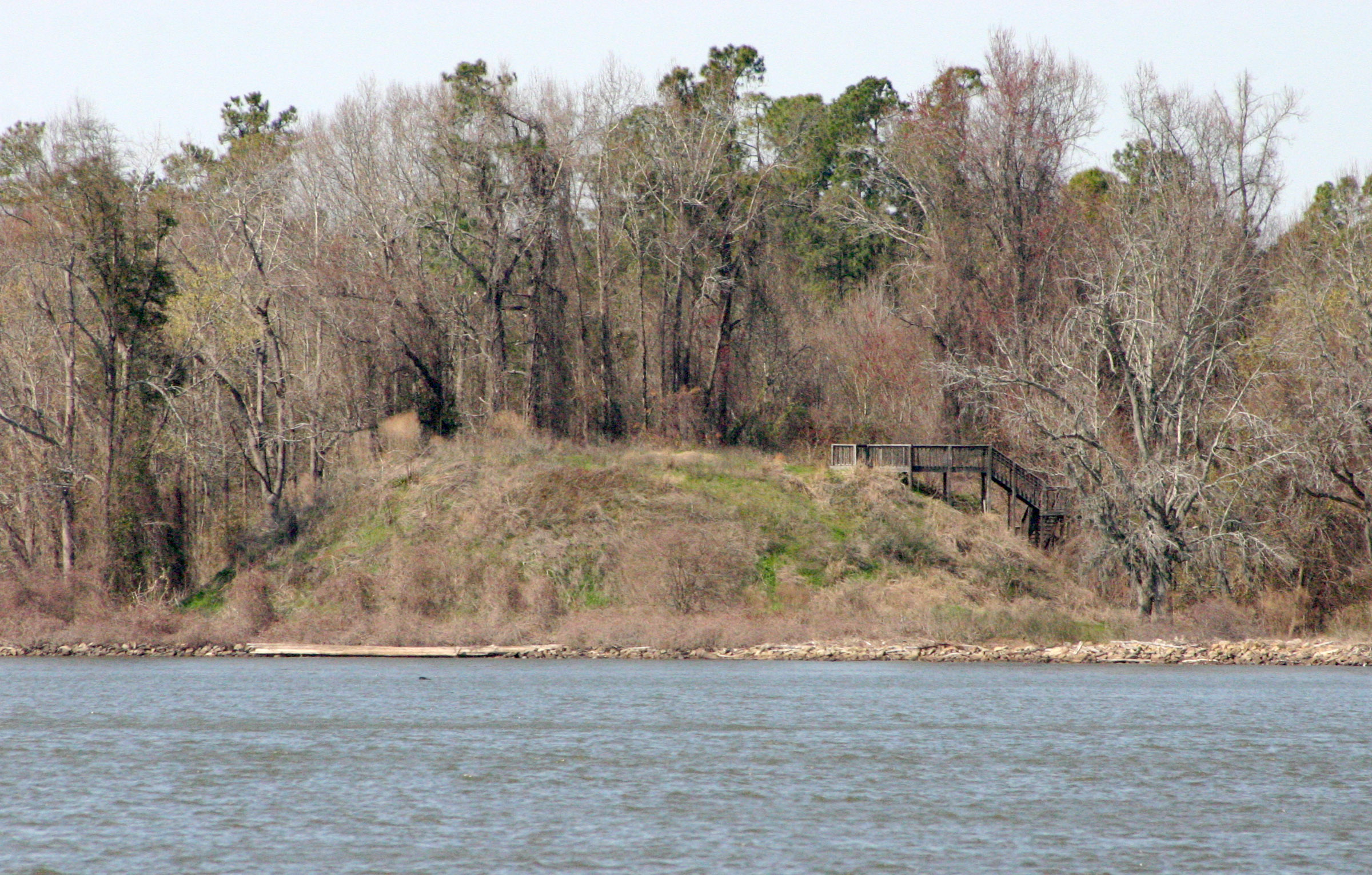
Native American mound next to Lake Marion (formerly Santee River). South Carolina is thought to be the easternmost expression of the Mississippian culture's moundbuilding.

Upon the death of other tribe members, a different tradition was observed. Their remains were left exposed on a platform for several days, during which a close relative with a blackened face would recite a eulogy. Eventually, the bones of these individuals were wrapped in possum fur cloth and annually cleaned and oiled. Some Santee families retained the bones of their ancestors for multiple generations, a practice also common among the Choctaw, Nanticoke, and several other indigenous tribes.

The Santee Indian Mound near Summerton, South Carolina was listed in the National Register of Historic Places in 1969.

=== Religion ===
Thomas Ashe, who published a report on South Carolina in 1682 under commission of the King of England, described the religious beliefs of the Santee as centering on the adoration of the sun and moon, noting that at the appearance of the new moon he witnessed tribal members "with open extended arms, then folded, with inclined bodies, to make their adoration with much ardency and passion".

== Legacy ==
It is traditionally thought that the remainder of the Santee people incorporated with the Catawba Nation following the Yamasee War. In 1981, between 750 and 1,000 individuals claimed Santee heritage within the White Oak Indian Community, about a mile and half north of Holly Hill, South Carolina. This community is state-recognized as the Santee Indian Organization by the South Carolina Commission of Minority Affairs but is not federally recognized by the Bureau of Indian Affairs.

Namesakes of the tribe include:

- High Hills of Santee
- Santee Cooper
- Santee Indian Mound and Fort Watson
- Santee River
- Santee, South Carolina
