= Winyah =

Historic Native American tribe

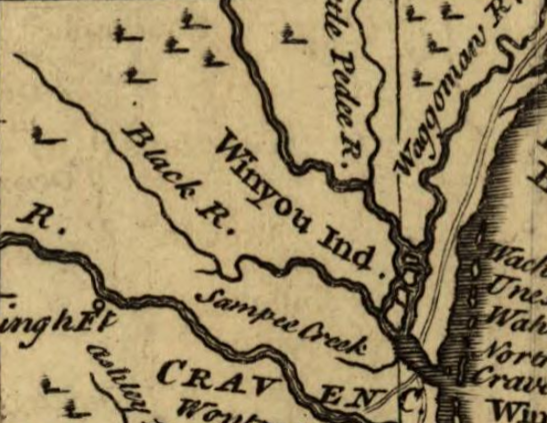
- Close-up of Emanuel Bowen's 1752 map, Provinces of North & South Carolina, Georgia, depicting the location of the Winyah or 'Winyou' Indians.

Total population
- 106 (1715)

Regions with significant populations
- United States ( South Carolina); Winyah Bay, Black River, and the lower course of the Pee Dee River.

Languages
- Siouan-Catawban (Catawban)

Religion
- Native American religion

Related ethnic groups
- Cape Fear, Pedee, Waccamaw

The Winyah (/ˈwɪnjɑː/ WIN-yah) are a historic Indigenous people of the Southeastern Woodlands within the Carolinas. Their traditional territory lay in the South Carolina Lowcountry, near Winyah Bay, the Black River, and the lower course of the Pee Dee River, in the present-day counties of Clarendon, Williamsburg, and Georgetown. Their language is considered by academics to have belonged to the Catawban language family.

Despite often siding with the Province of South Carolina during the American Indian Wars, the Winyah were enslaved and exported in large numbers during the late 17th century. They are regarded by academics and historians as having persisted in the region longer than similarly enslaved tribes, despite their small size, due to having sided with colonists in a successful war against the Waccamaw in 1720. By 1755, all of the tribes of the region had disappeared from the historical record, with the Winyah appearing as late as 1752 on a map between the Black and Pee Dee rivers. After disappearing from historical records, the remaining Winyah are presumed, like other small coastal tribes, to have been assimilated into English culture, being scattered about the settlements.

== Names ==
The exact etymological meaning of Winyah is presently unknown, though the tribe's language is generally accepted as Catawban. Anglicized variants include Winyaw, Winyaws, Wanniah, Wyniaws, Weneaws, and Wineaus. Other recorded spellings include Wee Nee and likely Wee Tee. Linguists consider the analysis of these names uncertain; however, anthropologist John R. Swanton and later linguist Blair A. Rudes concluded that they likely correspond to the names Yenyohol or Yenyochol recorded in Spanish accounts of the Ayllón colony in 1526.

== History ==
=== 16th century ===
The Winyah were a Native American people who inhabited the coastal region surrounding Winyah Bay for more than a millennium. They relied on fishing and hunting in and around the bay, which lies behind a shallow, narrow inlet connecting it to the Atlantic Ocean. The surrounding landscape consists of beaches, salt marshes, and low-lying coastal plains covered by extensive forests of longleaf pine, cypress, and cedar. Winyah Bay is located approximately 50 miles (80 km) northeast of present-day Charleston, South Carolina.

When Lucas Vázquez de Ayllón sailed into the same bay in 1526, his ships were met by the Indigenous inhabitants, who paddled dugout canoes to his galleon. Six months later, one of Ayllon's galleons, the Capitana, went aground in the inlet and was abandoned when the Spanish gave up their attempts to find gold in the region and returned to Hispanola. The Winyah people are considered by academics to be equivalent to the Yenyohol described to Peter Martyr d'Anghiera in the early 16th century by Francisco de Chicora, a man held captive and taken to Spain following the first 1521 expedition to the Carolinas. It is believed possible that members of the tribe may have also been enslaved by the Spanish at this time.

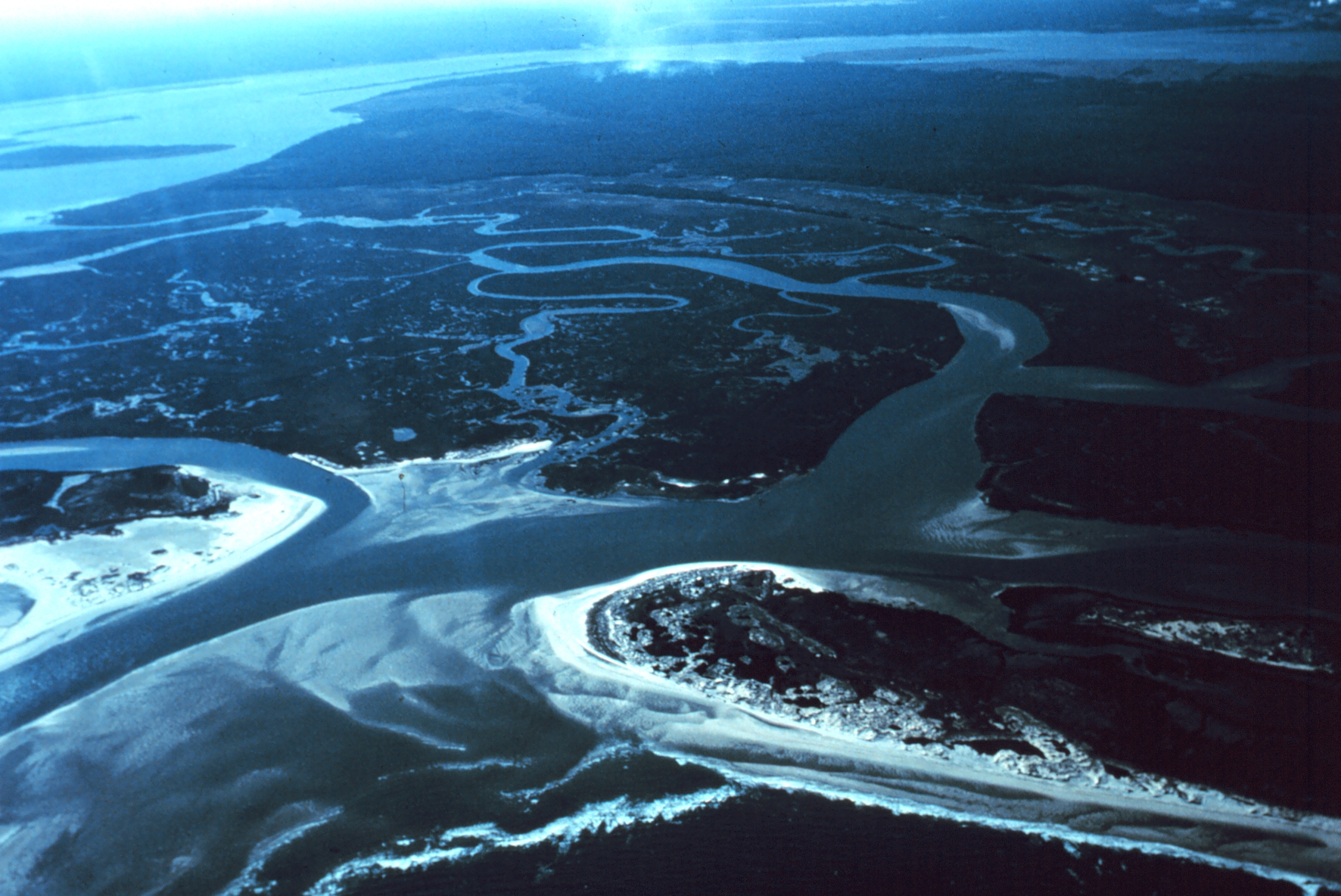
North Inlet of Winyah Bay, historic lands of the Winyah people

=== 17th century ===
The Winyah were later mentioned by English colonists of South Carolina after 1670. The tribe was at first allied with the colonists who settled in Charlestown, but this friendship soon was shattered when European slavers instigated a war against them in 1683 as an excuse to capture slaves. The war was connected to the Goose Creek Men, a group of wealthy planters from Goose Creek, South Carolina, who engaged in the Native American slave trade. The planters encouraged allied tribal groups, including the Westo and Shawnee, to raid neighboring groups and supply captives to sell as slaves in the West Indies.

Historians have considered slavery, more than war or disease, to have contributed to the decline of the coastal tribes near Winyah Bay, with more enslaved Native American exported from South Carolina than any other continental colony. The Lords Proprietors criticized the Goose Creek Men for instigating attacks against a people always friendly to the English, and for the killing and enslavement of innocent women and children. Winyah emissaries sent to Charlestown to seek peace were also enslaved.

=== 18th century ===
During the Tuscarora War of 1711, John Barnwell brought twenty-four Winyah warriors on his expedition into North Carolina, but they deserted him prior to arriving for lack of guns or ammunition.

Just prior to the Yamasee War, in 1715, the Winyah people lived in a single village of 106 people. Later that year the Cheraw attempted to pressure the tribe into participating in the war against the English but they refused, instead remaining allies of the colonists. Following the war, in 1716, a band of Winyah moved to the Santee River. However, after two years these Winyah, along with others, joined the Cape Fear Indians who had been driven from their lands in North Carolina, in a move adjacent to a trading post operated by Meredith Hughes at Uaunee, within present-day Georgetown County, South Carolina. The Cape Fear Indians eventually settled inland from Charleston in present-day Williamsburg County, South Carolina.

Following the Waccamaw settling on the Black River in 1718, the Winyah may have felt encroached on, as they aided the English in a successful war against the Waccamaw in 1720. Historians and other academics have considered the Winyah tribe, despite their small size, to have lasted longer in the region than other coastal tribes for this reason. Two years later, a 1722 map depicts the tribe on the south side of the Pee Dee River.

In 1724, members of the Winyah petitioned the colonial government of South Carolina for reservation lands on which to settle. By 1728, colonial officials proposed settling the Winyah together with a small band of Pedee people along the Santee River. The proposal was not carried out, and by 1731 plans for establishing reservations in the South Carolina Lowcountry had been abandoned.

The Winyah continued to appear intermittently in colonial sources into the mid-18th century, including on a 1752 map that located them between the Black and Pee Dee rivers. They subsequently disappeared from the historical record. William James Rivers described the Winyah and other surviving tribal remnants as "feeble and scattered", while archaeologist Stanley South later concluded that the surviving Winyah, like several other small coastal tribes, were apparently assimilated into English culture in the settlements.

== Claimed descent ==
Descendants of a tri-racial isolate community in Williamsburg County, locally maintain mixed Winyah-Dawhee ancestry. They are not presently state-recognized by South Carolina or federally recognized by the Bureau of Indian Affairs.

== Legacy ==
There are many namesakes of the Winyah tribe, including:

- Winyah Bay
- Winyah Park
- Winyah Indigo School
- Winyah Lake Junior Academy
- Prince George Winyah Parish Church
