= Saxapahaw, North Carolina =

- Census-designated place
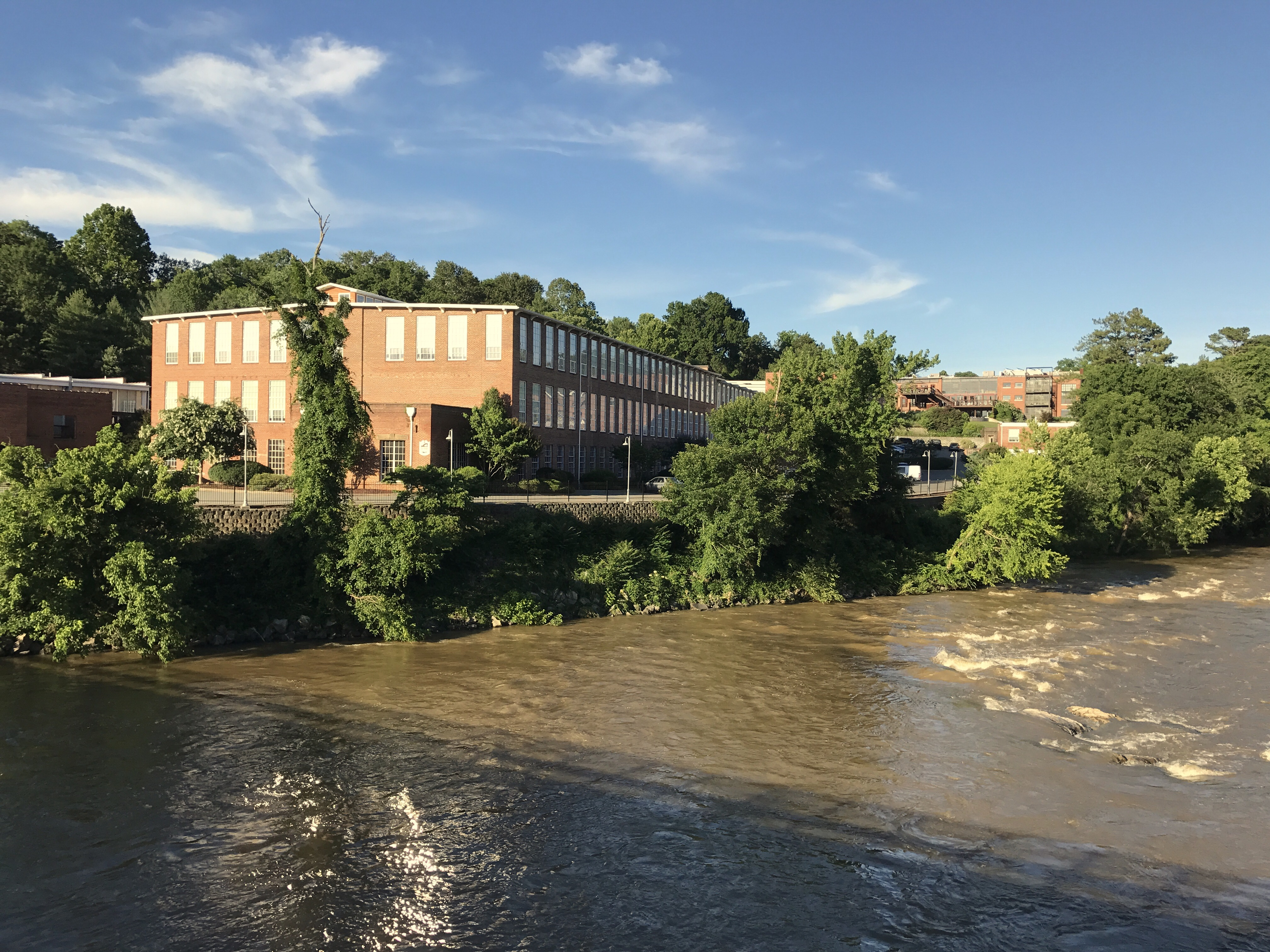
- The renovated Saxapahaw Spinning Mill building along the Haw River in the center of the village

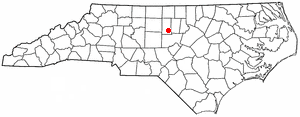
- Location of Saxapahaw, North Carolina
- Coordinates: 35°56′56″N 79°19′16″W
- Country: United States
- State: North Carolina
- County: Alamance
- Founded: 1844
- Named for: Sissipahaw Indians

Area
  - Total: 5.52 sq mi (14.29 km^{2})
  - Land: 5.19 sq mi (13.43 km^{2})
  - Water: 0.33 sq mi (0.86 km^{2})
- Elevation: 512 ft (156 m)

Population (2020)
  - Total: 1,671
  - Density: 322.3/sq mi (124.44/km^{2})
- Time zone: UTC-5 (Eastern (EST))
  - Summer (DST): UTC-4 (EDT)
- ZIP code: 27340
- Area code: 336
- FIPS code: 37-59580
- GNIS feature ID: 2402827

Saxapahaw (/ˈsæksəpəhɔː/ SAKS-uh-puh-haw) is a census-designated place (CDP) and unincorporated area in Alamance County, North Carolina, United States. It is part of the Burlington, North Carolina Metropolitan Statistical Area. As of the 2020 census, Saxapahaw had a population of 1,671.

== History ==
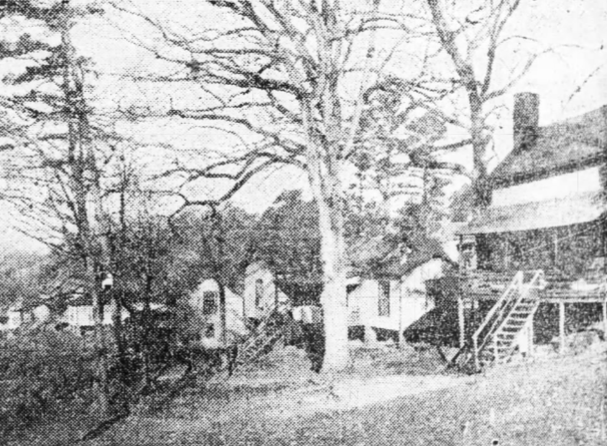
Mill homes in 1917

The Former Saxapahaw Spinning Mill and James Monroe Thompson House are listed on the National Register of Historic Places. The name Saxapahaw is from the Catawban /sak'yápha:/, which is composed of /sak/ ("hill") and /yápha:/ ("step").

Saxapahaw, like most communities in Alamance County, was a mill town built around the community's cotton mill and along the Haw River. The first mill was built in the community in 1844 by the Quaker settler John Newlin, but was later demolished to make way for a brick structure. The current mill building was owned and operated by Dixie Yarns until 1994, when a tornado damaged the structure and operations never resumed. Building remodeling was completed in 2006 and the facility, now known as Rivermill, houses apartments.

The Haw River Ballroom is a music venue set in the former Dye House of Saxapahaw's historic cotton mill.

== Geography ==
According to the United States Census Bureau, the CDP has a total area of 5.5 square miles (14.3 km^{2}), of which 5.2 square miles (13.4 km^{2}) is land and 0.35 square miles (0.9 km^{2}), or 6.01%, is water.

== Demographics ==
Historical population
Census	Pop.	Note	%±
2010	1,648		—
2020	1,671		1.4%
U.S. Decennial Census

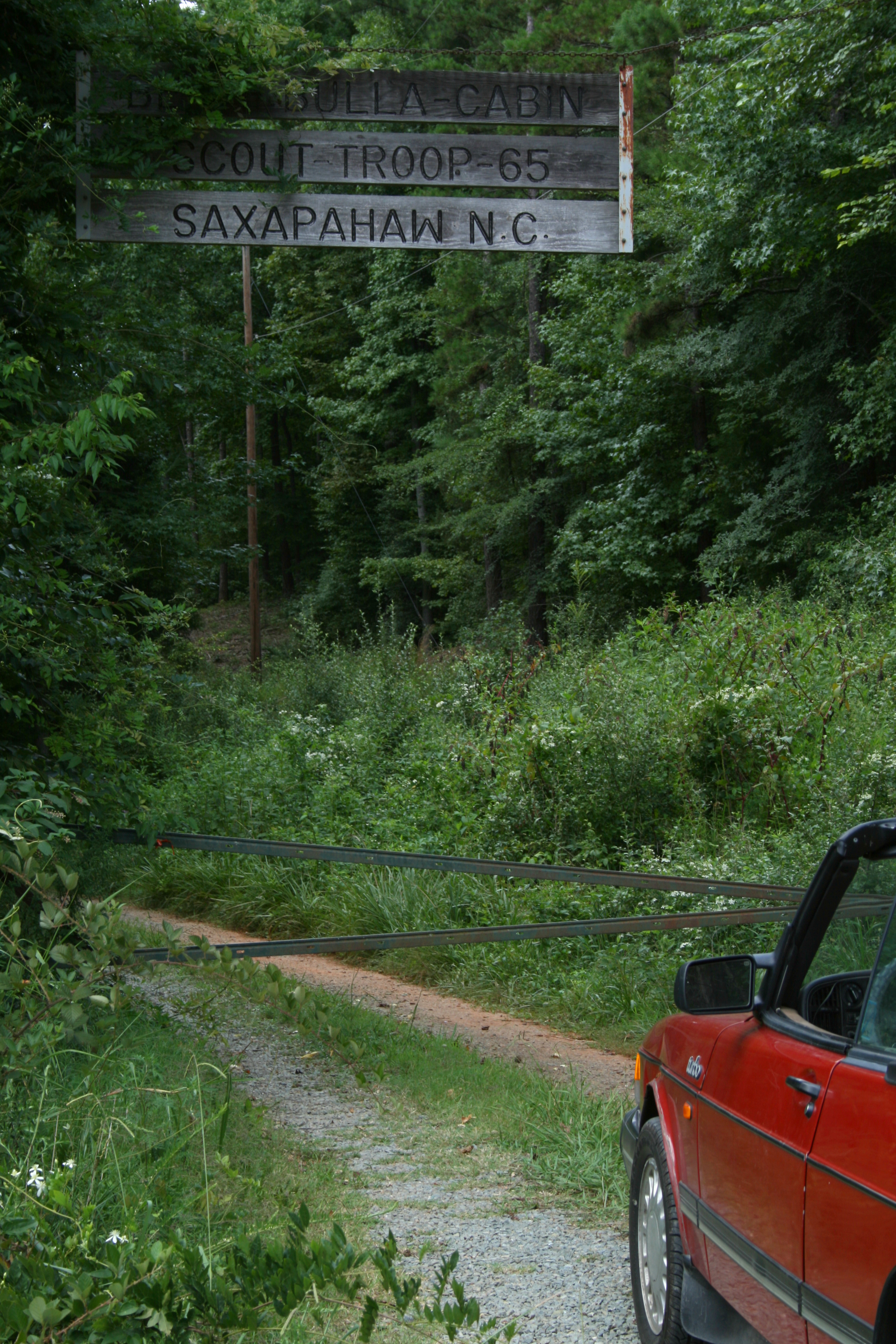
Gateway to the Ben Bulla Boy Scout Cabin in Saxapahaw

As of the census of 2000, there were 1,418 people, 541 households, and 399 families residing in the CDP. The population density was 270.1 inhabitants per square mile (104.3/km^{2}). There were 577 housing units at an average density of 109.9 per square mile (42.4/km^{2}). The racial makeup of the CDP was 81.24% White, 13.40% African American, 0.07% Native American, 0.42% Asian, 3.46% from other races, and 1.41% from two or more races. Hispanic or Latino of any race were 6.21% of the population.

There were 541 households, out of which 37.3% had children under the age of 18 living with them, 55.6% were married couples living together, 13.1% had a female householder with no husband present, and 26.1% were non-families. 19.4% of all households were made up of individuals, and 6.1% had someone living alone who was 65 years of age or older. The average household size was 2.62 and the average family size was 3.00.

In the CDP the population was spread out, with 25.9% under the age of 18, 8.0% from 18 to 24, 34.2% from 25 to 44, 24.2% from 45 to 64, and 7.8% who were 65 years of age or older. The median age was 34 years. For every 100 females, there were 99.2 males. For every 100 females age 18 and over, there were 96.4 males.

The median income for a household in the CDP was $37,204, and the median income for a family was $51,528. Males had a median income of $30,152 versus $27,625 for females. The per capita income for the CDP was $18,055. About 7.9% of families and 9.7% of the population were below the poverty line, including 8.1% of those under age 18 and 34.6% of those age 65 or over.

== Notable people ==
- Tom Zachary, native of Saxapahaw and professional baseball pitcher, who won two World Series as a member of the Washington Senators and New York Yankees
- Whammy Douglas, native of Saxapahaw and professional baseball pitcher, who played for the 1957 Pittsburgh Pirates
- B. Everett Jordan, US senator from North Carolina
- Paperhand Puppet Intervention, puppet theatre company founded in 1998; performances feature messages of social activism
- Tommy LaGarde, played college basketball for UNC, and played in the NBA for Denver, Dallas, Seattle, and NJ.
