= Waccamaw Siouan Indians =

State-recognized tribe in North Carolina, United States

- Waccamaw Siouan Indian Tribe
- Official seal of the Waccamaw Siouan Tribe
- Named after: Waccamaw people Waccamaw River
- Formation: 1910: Council of Wide Awake Indians, 1977: Waccamaw Siouan Indian Tribe (nonprofit)
- Type: state-recognized tribe, nonprofit organization
- Tax ID no.: EIN 59-1739024
- Legal status: school, educational service provider, charity
- Purpose: P84: Ethnic, Immigrant Centers and Service Provider
- Headquarters: Bolton, North Carolina
- Location: United States
- Members: 2,313 self-identified 1,245 enrolled (2000)
- Official language: English
- Revenue: $391,626 (2020)
- Expenses: $399,935 (2020)
- Staff: 17 (2020)
- Website: waccamaw-siouan.org

The Waccamaw Siouan Indians are one of eight state-recognized tribes in North Carolina. Also known as the Waccamaw Siouan Indian Tribe, they are not federally recognized. They are headquartered in Bolton, North Carolina, in Columbus County, and also have members in Bladen County in southeastern North Carolina. In 1910, they organized as the Council of Wide Awake Indians. They founded a public school in 1933.

They are not affiliated with the Waccamaw Indian People, a state-recognized tribe from South Carolina. The Waccamaw Siouan Indians also hold no affiliation with the Waccamaw Sioux Indian Tribe of Farmers Union, an unrecognized tribe based in Clarkton, North Carolina.

Waccamaw Siouan Indians live in St. James, Buckhead, and Council, with the Waccamaw Siouan tribal homeland situated on the edge of Green Swamp about 37 miles from Wilmington, North Carolina, seven miles from Lake Waccamaw, and four miles north of Bolton, North Carolina. Their descent from the historic Waccamaw is contested by some scholars.

== History ==
According to the Waccamaw Siouan Indians, thousands of years ago, an immense meteor appeared in the night sky toward the southwest. Flaming to a brilliance of suns as it hurtled earthward, the meteor finally struck, burning deep within the earth. The waters of the surrounding swamps and rivers flowed into the crater and cooled it, creating the gem-blue, verdant green lake. Some historians contend that this story is the mid-20th century invention of James E. Alexander.

=== Historical Waccamaw ===
Archeologist Martin T. Smith suggests that the 1521 Spanish expedition led by Francisco Girebillo likely encountered a Waccamaw village. Describing the inhabitants of the river valley as semi-nomadic, Girebillo noted that they relied on hunting and gathering, and limited agriculture.

John Lawson had placed the Woccon a few miles to the south of the Tuscarora in his New Voyage to Carolina (1700). Settling around the confluence of the Waccamaw and Pee Dee rivers, this amalgam of tribes had fragmented by 1705. The South Carolina Colony tried to persuade the Waccamaw, along with the Cape Fear Indians to join their side in the Tuscarora War. By the second decade of the 18th century, many Waccamaw were located one hundred miles northeast of Charleston, South Carolina. In 1720, a war broke out between the Waccamaw and South Carolina Colony. After the War, authorities had difficulty finding the Waccamaw. Accounts vary, placing them near the Catawba, captured by the Seneca, near Lake Waccamaw, or living under the Peedee.

=== Modern history ===
In 1993, scholar Lisa Aldred noted scholars did not agree on if the Waccamaw-Siouan descended from the historic Waccamaw. She stated surnames among the modern Waccamaw-Siouans were present under the category "all other free persons" in the 1800 United States census. Genealogist Paul Heinegg states the Waccamaw Siouans are an invented North Carolina tribe. He states they were created in the wake of Person County granting a separate school to a 1887 group referred to as "old issue negroes", who were later listed as "Cubans", "Mongolians", then "the Indian race".

==== Education ====
Through much of the 19th century, children ancestral to the Waccamaw Siouan Tribe received no public school education. The public schools had only two classifications: white and Black. They were restricted from white schools, due to not being white, and refused to enroll their children in Black schools. Having been free people before the war, they did not want to enroll their children in school with the children of freedmen.

Late in the 19th century, the Croatan Indians of Robeson County (now called Lumbee Tribe of North Carolina) gained state-recognition as tribes and support for a separate school. The Croatan Indians of Samson County, now called the Coharie Intra-tribal Council, Inc. built their own schools and later still, developed their own school system. The Buckhead Indian community followed suit by founding the Doe Head School in 1885. The school was open only sporadically. It closed in 1921, after the state had sent a Black teacher to the school, and the community asked the teacher to leave.

==== 20th century ====
The first predecessor to the Waccamaw Siouan Tribe was the Council of the Wide Awake Indians, which was able to open a publicly funded school. The school was built in 1933 in the Buckhead community in Bladen County. Students who wanted to attend high school among self-identified Indians went to the Coharie Intra-tribal Council's community's East Carolina High School in Clinton, North Carolina; the Lumbee Fairmont High School in Fairmont, Robeson County; or the Catawba Indian School in South Carolina.

Combining multiple trends used by groups in the Southeast with ambiguous origins, the Waccamaw Siouan Tribe created their name by pairing the name of a local lake and the language family likely spoken by indigenous groups in the region. (Note: Scholar Renate Bartl states that "triracial" groups in North Carolina, including the Waccamaw Sioux, may claim heritage from local Native American nations, even when they were extinct or had been deported.) They converted their old school building into their tribal headquarters. The Waccamaw Siouan Indians received state recognition in 1971 and organized as a nonprofit group, which forms its elected government. They are working on documentation to gain federal recognition.

After participating in a 1970 cultural workshop held by the Haliwa-Saponi, the Waccamaw Siouans began holding powwows. These powwows were imported from Plains Indian cultural traditions, rather than those indigenous to the region or to any regional tribe. They were somewhat invented, created within a Pan-Indian context. Among the Waccamaw-Siouans, the powwow became highly embedded, and was reinterpreted as a local symbol of identity, replacing the Indian school as the main institution of the tribe.

== Government ==
=== Nonprofit organization ===
In 1977, the Waccamaw Siouan Indian Tribe incorporated as a 501(c)(3) nonprofit organization, based in Bolton, North Carolina.

The tribe is governed by the Waccamaw Siouan Tribal Council, Inc., consisting of six members who are elected by the tribal membership, with staggered terms of one to three years. The Tribal Chief's position, formerly inherited or handed down in personal appointment, is now also an elected position. The tribe has an Elders Review Committee, which conducts monthly tribal meetings to inform and educate members about issues of importance to the tribe as a whole. The opinions and suggestions of tribal members are solicited during these meetings and are incorporated into the decision-making process.

The tribal council employs a tribal administrator to handle the day-to-day operations of the tribe, with an annual budget of approximately $1 million. The administrator supervises the management of tribal grant programs and provides a monthly reporting of the status of grant activities to local, state, and federal agencies, private donors, the tribal council, and tribal members.

=== Recognition process ===
The Waccamaw-Siouan were designated and officially recognized by the state of North Carolina on July 20, 1971, through the passage of a law by the North Carolina General Assembly. North Carolina General Statutes § 71A-4. Waccamaw Siouan Tribe of North Carolina lays out their rights, privileges, immunities, obligations and duties:

"The Indians now living in Bladen and Columbus and adjoining counties of North Carolina, originally found by the first white settlers in the region of the Cape Fear River, Lake Waccamaw, and the Waccamaw Indians, a Siouan Tribe which inhabited the areas surrounding the Waccamaw, Pee Dee, and Lumber Rivers in North and South Carolina, shall, from and after July 20, 1971, be designated and officially recognized as the Waccamaw Siouan Tribe of North Carolina and shall continue to enjoy all their rights, privileges and immunities as citizens of the State as now or hereafter provided by law, and shall continue to be subject to all the obligations and duties of citizens under the law."

The "Waccamaw-Siouan from Columbus and Bladen Counties" hold membership on the North Carolina Commission of Indian Affairs as per NCGS 143B-407.

==== Federal recognition ====
The Waccamaw Siouan Indian Tribe is not federally recognized.

Their congressional representative introduced a failed bill for federal recognition in 1948. Lumbee Legal Services, Inc., represents the Waccamaw Siouan Tribe in its administrative process for seeking federal recognition.

=== Services ===
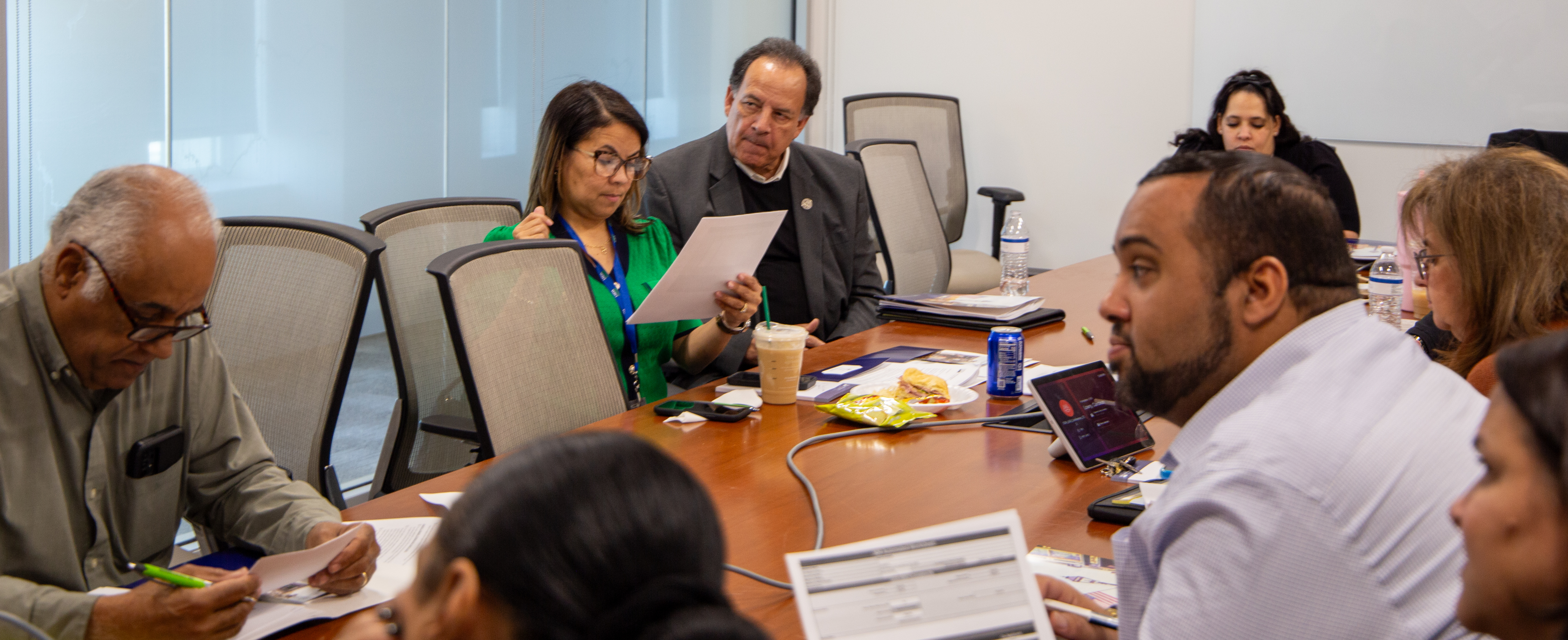
Members of the Waccamaw-Siouan, Lumbee, Haliwa-Saponi, and Coharie tribes at a training meeting by the North Carolina Commission of Indian Affairs in 2025.

The Waccamaw Siouan Indian Tribe operates a HUD Native American Housing Assistance Project, which helps its members with housing rehabilitation, housing down payments, and emergency funding. They also operate a child day care center.

=== Activities ===
The tribe holds an annual cultural festival and powwow. This takes place on the third Friday and Saturday of October at the Waccamaw Siouan Tribal Grounds in the Buckhead Community of Bolton, North Carolina. Open to the public, the powwow includes a dance competition, drumming competition, horse show, and gospel sing. A crafts fair features items made by members of the Waccamaw tribe, and demonstrations of the associated craft skills.

== Demographics ==
The tribe is centered on the edge of Green Swamp, seven miles from Lake Waccamaw. Its headquarters is in Bolton, North Carolina.

According to the 2010 Census, the total Waccamaw Siouan population in Columbus and Bladen counties was 1,896 (1,025 and 331, respectively). This represents 2.7% of the total combined Native American population of North Carolina. Current tribal enrollment consists of 2,594 members. Between 1980 and 2000, the two-county area experienced a small overall population increase of 6.7% compared with a 37% rate of growth for North Carolina. The growth of the Native American demographic was 61%.

== See also ==
- Racial isolates in the United States
  - Brandywine people
  - Delaware Moors
  - Dominickers
  - Lumbee
  - Melungeons
  - Redbones

== Bibliography ==
- Miller, Mark Edwin (16 August 2013). Claiming Tribal Identity: The Five Tribes and the Politics of Federal Acknowledgment. Norman, OK: University of Oklahoma Press. ISBN 978-0806143781.
