= Sissipahaw =

Historical Native American tribe of North Carolina, U.S.

Sissipahaw

Total population
- Extinct

Regions with significant populations
- On Haw River in present-day Saxapahaw, North Carolina. Possibly in South Carolina.

Languages
- Probably Catawban

Religion
- Native American religion

Related ethnic groups
- Shakori, Catawba

The Sissipahaw or Haw were a Native American tribe of North Carolina. Their settlements were generally located in the vicinity of modern-day Saxapahaw, North Carolina on the Haw River in Alamance County upstream from Cape Fear. They were possibly first recorded by the Spaniard Vendera in the 16th century as the Sauxpa in South Carolina. Their last mention in history is that the tribe joined the Yamasee against the English colonists in the Yamasee War of 1715. Some scholars speculate that they may have been a branch of the Shakori due to being so closely associated with that tribe but others disagree.

== Name ==
The meaning of sissipahaw is unknown but it probably derives from a Catawban language. Colonel John Barnwell reported in a letter that the Sissipahaw were called Shacioes by some during the Tuscarora War. Linguist Ives Goddard proposed that this may be the Sissipahaw's endonym, but he acknowledged that it was impossible to ascertain how Barnwell originally spelled the term due his letter surviving only as a copy.

== Language ==
Sissipahaw
- Saxapahaw
- (unattested)
- Native to: United States
- Region: North Carolina
- Ethnicity: Sissipahaw
- Extinct: (date missing)
- Language family: Catawban?: Sissipahaw

Language codes
- ISO 639-3: None (mis)
- Linguist List: 07t
- Glottolog: None

While the Sissipahaw were probably of the Catawban linguistic family, their language is extinct, with no words being known. Four numbers attributed to the Sissipahaw are given by the historian, Sallie Walker Stockard, in The History of Alamance, however, these numbers appear to be taken from John Lawson's word list of "Tuskeruro" which has been identified as the first substantial documentation of the Tuscarora language.

== History ==
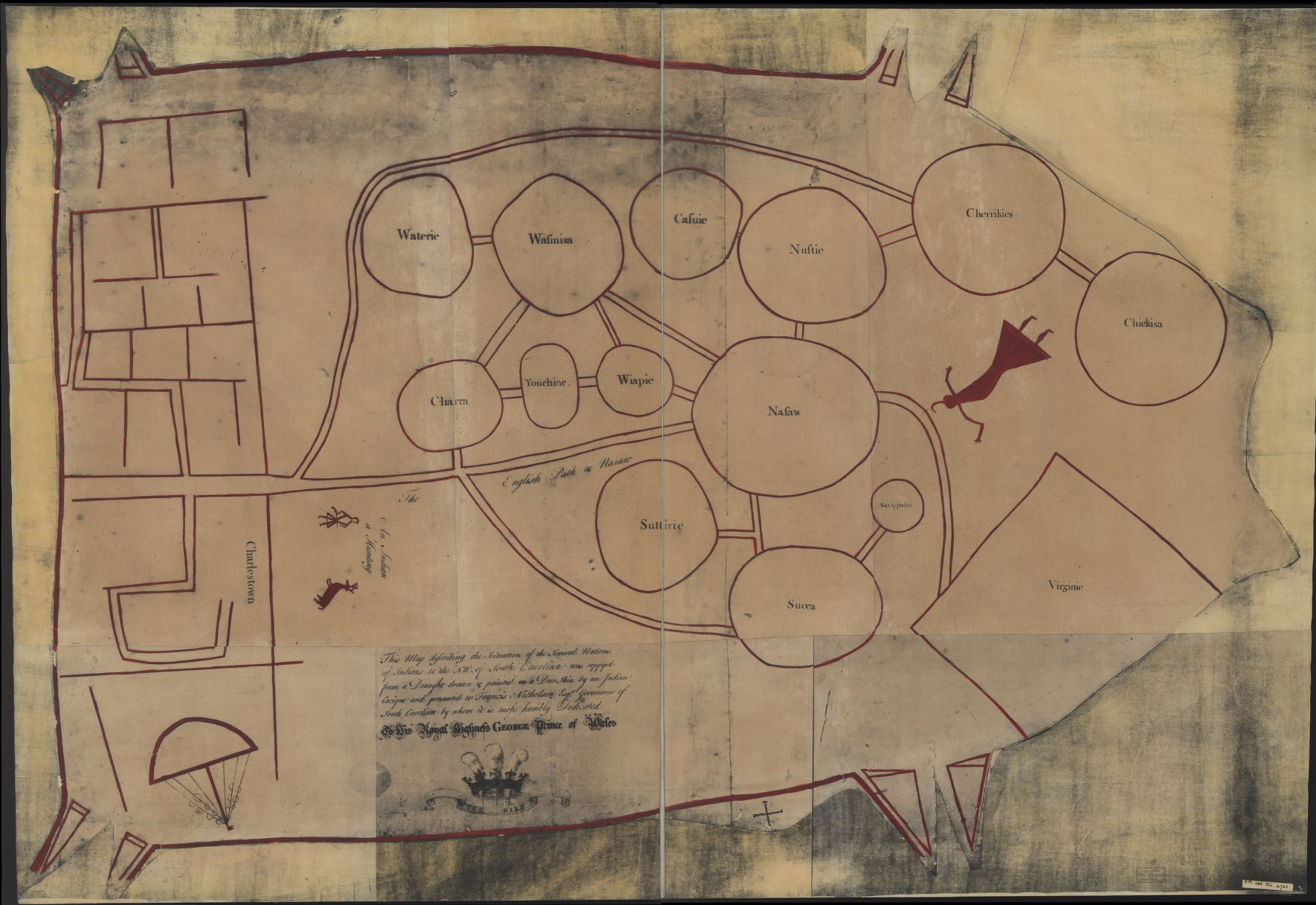
A c. 1724 annotated copy of a deerskin Catawba map of the tribes between Charleston (left) and Virginia (right) following the displacements of a century of disease and enslavement and the 1715–17 Yamasee War. The Sissipahaw are labeled as "Saxippaha".

The Sissipahaw were possibly first encountered and recorded as the Sauxpa by the Spanish officer Vandera in 1569 as a placed visited by the explorer Juan Pardo. If true, this would imply a historic migration from coastal South Carolina. However, Goddard argued that this assumption is unfounded and primarily based on a misreading of a 19th-century rendering of "Sauapa" which itself is likely a misrendering of "Sanapa". Regardless, the tribe is later referred to as the Sissipahau in 1701 by English explorer John Lawson, who had likely heard of them as living on the Haw River from his guide, Enoe Will, the chief of the Shakori. Will had a Sissipahaw servant or slave who traveled alongside him and Lawson.

On January 28, 1712, during the Tuscarora War, an army of 450 Native Americans and 33 Europeans are noted to have rested at a recently abandoned Sissipahaw town on the Neuse River.

The final mention of the tribe is in 1715, when they united with other tribes of the region to fight against the English in the Yamasee War. It is thought that the Sissipahaw, along with other remnants of neighboring tribes, joined the Catawba after the war. In 1728, the site of the former Sissipahaw village was known as the Haw old fields and was noted as being the largest body of fertile land in the region. Present-day Saxapahaw, North Carolina probably corresponds to the site of these old fields.

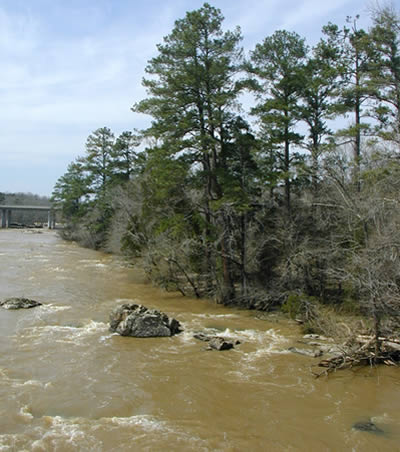
The Haw River area was the homeland of the Sissipahaw Tribe

== Legacy ==
There is no recorded history of the Sissipahaw after the Yamasee War of 1715, other than to mention the tribe's participation against the English colonists. Stockard states that the tribe is remembered through local names such as Haw River, Saxapahaw, and Altamahaw, North Carolina. She also alleges the town of Ossipee, North Carolina derives its name from the tribe but the term "Ossipee" occurs in other states and has been thought to possibly derive from Abenaki.
