= Former Saxapahaw Spinning Mill =

- U.S. National Register of Historic Places
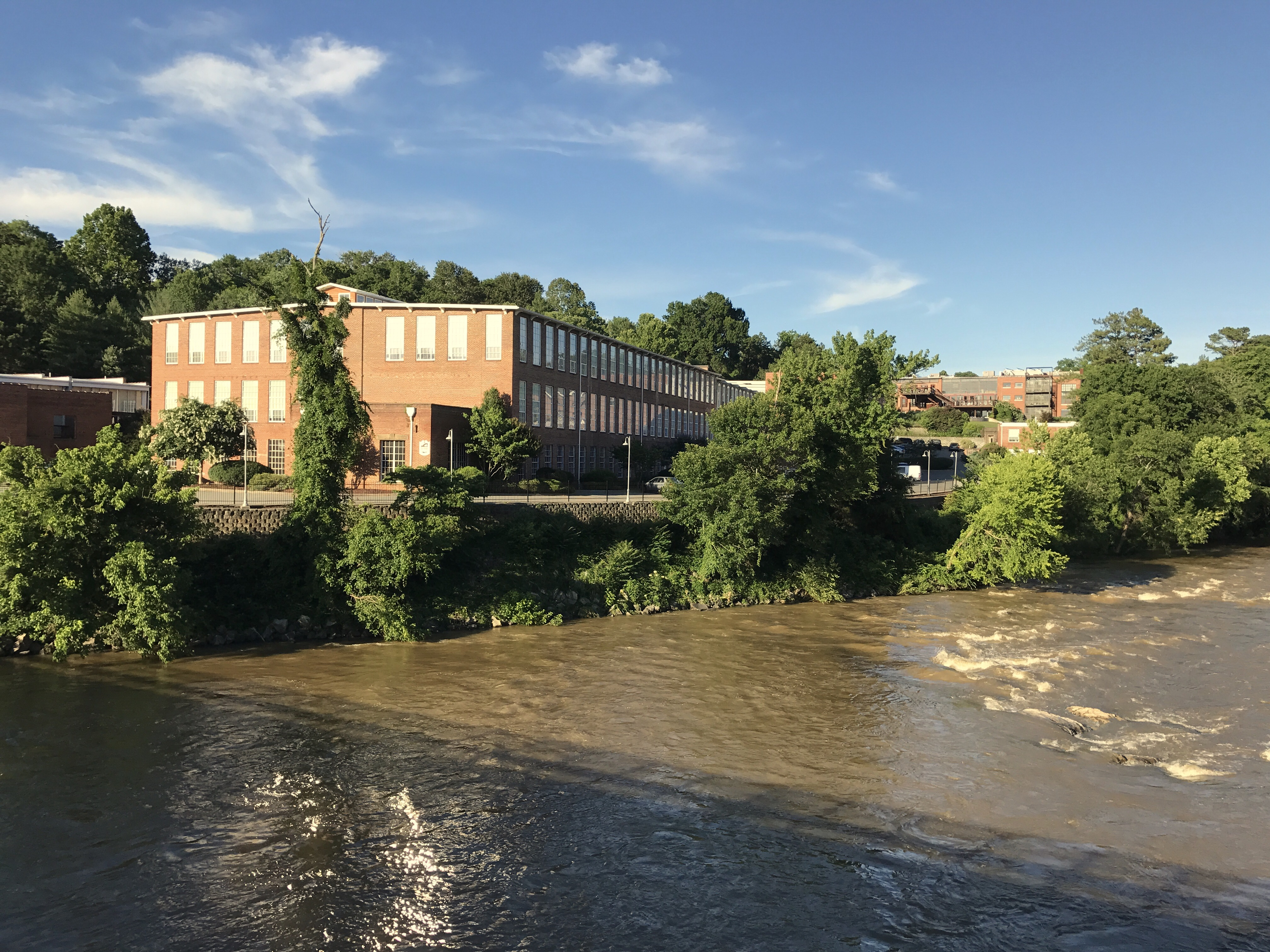
- Saxapahaw Spinning Mill building in 2019, following renovation

- Location within North Carolina Location within the United States
- Location: 1647 Saxapahaw Bethlehem Church Rd., Saxapahaw, North Carolina
- Coordinates: 35°56′48″N 79°19′16″W
- Area: 6.7 acres (2.7 ha)
- Built: 1906-1938
- Architectural style: early industrial
- NRHP reference No.: 98000546
- Added to NRHP: May 20, 1998

Former Saxapahaw Spinning Mill is a former textile mill building located at Saxapahaw, Alamance County, North Carolina. It was built between 1906 and 1938, and is a three-story, augmented L-shaped brick, heavy timber and steel building. It was later expanded in the 1940s and 1950s. The former power house was built about 1880, and is a small rectangular, brick, side-gabled building. The Saxapahaw Mill operated for almost 150 years until Dixie Yarns, owners from 1978 to 1995, closed its doors in 1994.

It was added to the National Register of Historic Places in 1998.

The building is currently the home to The Eddy Pub, a restaurant; the Haw River Ballroom, a music venue; a coffee shop; and a brewery. The lower building has been converted into apartments and offices as well as a yoga studio.
