= Cape Fear Indians =

Extinct Native American tribe from North Carolina

Daw-hee?

Total population
- Extinct

Regions with significant populations
- Originally from Cape Fear River, North Carolina

Languages
- unknown, possibly Siouan

Religion
- unknown

Related ethnic groups
- possibly Waccamaw, Winyah

The Cape Fear Indians were a small, coastal tribe of Native Americans who lived on the Cape Fear River in North Carolina (now Carolina Beach State Park).

== Name and language ==
Cape Fear
- Daw-hee?
- Native to: United States
- Region: North Carolina
- Ethnicity: Cape Fear
- Extinct: (date missing)
- Language family: Siouan?: Cape Fear

Language codes
- ISO 639-3: None (mis)
- Linguist List: 073
- Glottolog: None

The autonym of the Cape Fear Indians may have been Daw-hee. Their name for the area was Chicora. Of their villages, only one, Necoes, is known by name. The colonists noted Necoes as about 20 miles from the mouth of the Cape Fear River, in present-day Brunswick County. Their language is unknown and may have been a Siouan language.

== History ==
Smallpox spread from Spanish colonies in Florida to the Carolinas in the 16th century. The population of the Cape Fear Indians was estimated to be 1,000 in 1600. A colonial census in 1715 recorded that they numbered 206.

British colonist William Hilton observed 100 Indians at Cape Fear in 1662. One Indian individual sold to Hilton Cape Fear River and adjacent lands. In 1664 the settlement called Charles Towne was founded, but it was abandoned in 1667 after war broke out between the Cape Fear Indians and the settlers over British slavery of Indians. The second Charles Towne was founded near Cape Fear lands in 1670.;

Some Cape Fear Indians fought with their Catawba allies under Colonel John Barnwell against the Tuscarora in 1712. When the Tuscarora War broke out in North Carolina in 1711, South Carolina tribes joined in the fighting. In 1712, Cape Fear warriors and the Cheraw, Saxapahaw, Winyah, and Pedee served in British Captain John Bull's company to fight alongside the British against the Tuscarora and helped defeat them. As a result, most of the Tuscarora left the area and migrated north, reaching present-day New York and Ontario to join the related Haudenosaunee Confederacy of Iroquois tribes.

The Cape Fear Indians and the Winyah people migrated from their coastal villages up the Pee Dee River adjacent to a trading post the British founded in 1716. They eventually settled inland from Charleston in what is now known as Williamsburg County, South Carolina. In May 1749 provision was made by the Governor in Council to render protection to them through supplying their representatives with fifty pounds of bullets and twenty-five pounds of powder. There had previously been complaints that the Cape Fear were being abused and driven from nearby hunting lands by neighboring Europeans. It was ruled that they were a peaceable people and that their rights to hunt were protected by the government. Anthropologist John R. Swanton wrote, "In 1808 White neighbors remembered when as many as 30 Pedee and Cape Fear Indians lived in their old territories," but by this time "the Pedee and Cape Fear tribes were represented by one half-blood woman."
