= Paperhand Puppet Intervention =

Puppet performance company in North Carolina

Paperhand Puppet Project
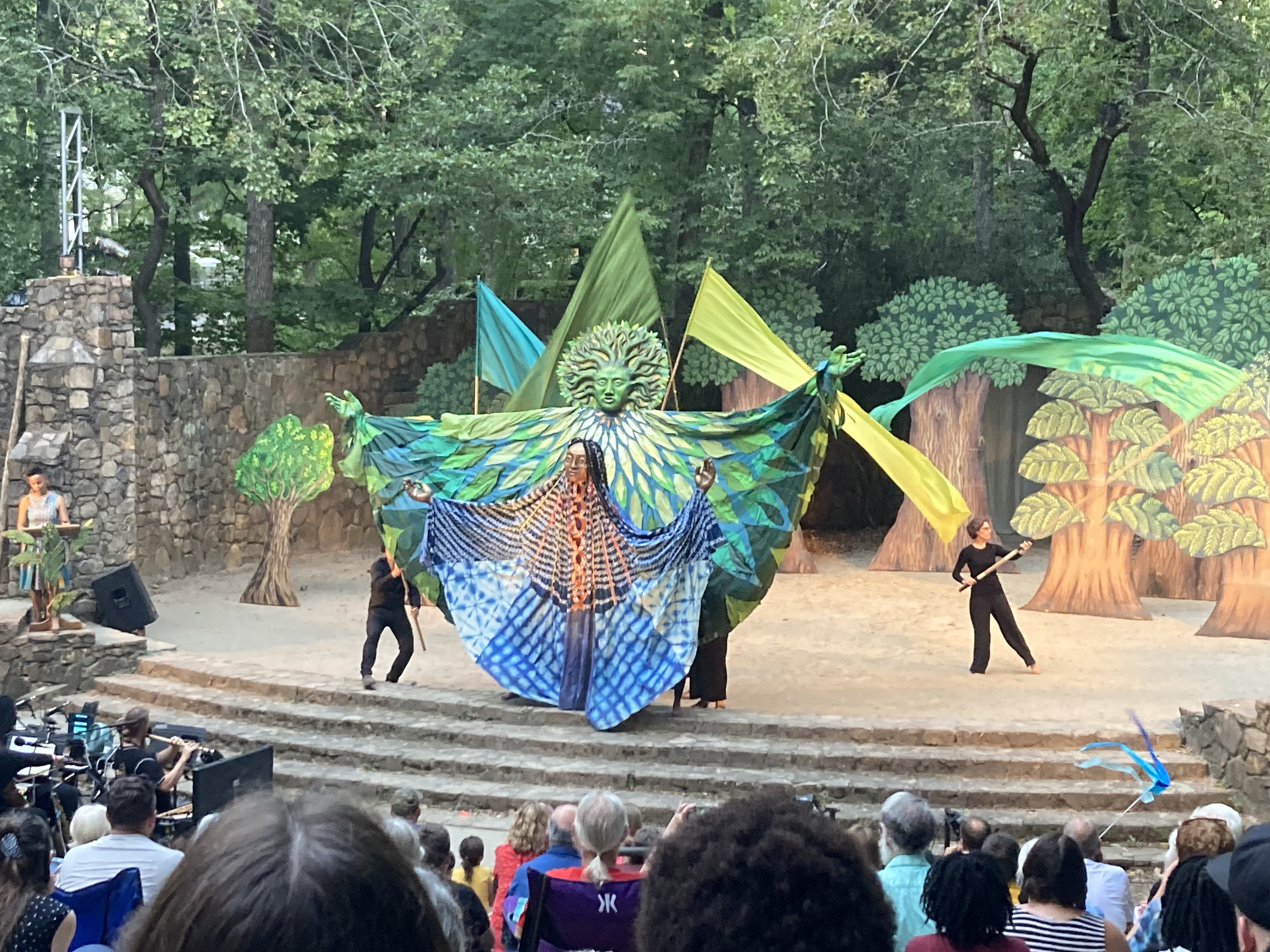
- A scene from Paperhand's 23rd Annual Summer Show Where Our Spirits Reside featuring Nnenna Freelon (left)
- Industry: Theatre
- Founded: 1998; 28 years ago
- Founder: Donovan Zimmerman, Jan Burger
- Headquarters: Saxapahaw, North Carolina, United States
- Website: paperhandpuppet.org

Paperhand Puppet Project (formerly known as Paperhand Puppet Intervention) is a puppet theatre non-profit based in Saxapahaw, North Carolina and founded in 1998 by Donovan Zimmerman and Jan Burger. Frequently performing outdoors, the group performs original stories inspired by the relationship between the natural world and humanity. The stories include messages of social commentary and activism especially regarding conservation and race.

== History ==
=== Donovan Zimmerman ===
Donovan Zimmerman was born on June 2nd, 1970 in Cincinnati, Ohio and was raised by his single mother and his maternal grandmother in the Northside neighborhood of Cincinnati. At the age of nine, he was encouraged by his mother to audition for the School for Creative and Performing Arts. He graduated and started at the Art Academy of Cincinnati with a partial scholarship before dropping out to travel after his first year. In the next five years, he lived somewhat nomadically across North America, often spending time in hippie communes. He was inspired by a giant puppet show he saw in 1990 performed by Bread and Puppet Theater in Vermont. He contracted malaria in Southern Mexico with a group of friends before traveling to the Haw River Festival in Saxapahaw, North Carolina where he first met Paperhand cofounder Jan Burger. He founded his first puppet company, Sticks and Stones Theatre, while living in Oregon.

=== Jan Burger ===
Jan Burger was born to European immigrant artists who had grown up in the Bruderhof commune, his mother worked as an illustrator and his father as a muralist. As a child, his family spend time in Northeastern Vermont where he first encountered Bread and Puppet Theater. He is a follower of their "Cheap Art" movement. He dropped out of high school before beginning art school while doing carpentry work with his father. He hitchhiked aboard a train to North Carolina, where he met the organizers of the Haw River Festival. While living in Boston, he worked with Food Not Bombs giving out free vegan meals on Boston Common. He frequently took puppets from the Boston Puppet Free Library to protests. Burger worked with Bread and Puppet Theater before he and his future wife Emma began living in their truck. He worked with In the Heart of the Beast Puppet and Mask Theater while living in Minneapolis, Minnesota and worked with Wise Fool Puppet Intervention while living in the Bay Area of San Francisco, California. He began working with Art and Revolution Convergence producing block prints for the Acteal, Chiapes massacre vigil, a march for the United Farm Workers featuring a Cesar Chavez puppet, and constructing puppets to protest the continued bombing of Iraq. He was invited to come back to North Carolina by the organizers of the Haw River Festival to create a puppet show. He brought Zimmerman on as a collaborator to help with the story and music while he worked on the puppet construction.

=== Productions ===
- 1998: The Water of Life*
- 1999: The Old Cow who Helped Save the River*
- 1999: A Very Old Unfinished Story
- 2000: The Crawdad's Conundrum*
- 2000: Uprising
- 2001: Listen to the Sky
- 2002: The Dream and the Lie
- 2003: Wood, Stone, Fire, and Bone
- 2004: Garden of the Wild
- 2005: As the Crow Flies
- 2006: A Shoe for Your Foot
- 2008: Hungry Ghost
- 2008: I Am an Insect
- 2009: Love and Robots
- 2009: The Living Sea of Memory
- 2010: Islands Unknown
- 2011: The Serpent's Egg
- 2012: City of Frogs
- 2012: The Longest Night
- 2013: Invisible Earth
- 2014: The Painted Bird
- 2015: A Drop in the Bucket
- 2016: The Beautiful Beast
- 2017: Of Wings and Feet
- 2018: In the Heart of the Fire
- 2019: We Are Here
- 2021: Unfolding Seeds: Invocations of Transformation
- 2022: The Meanwhile Clock and Other Impossible Dances
- 2023: Where Our Spirits Reside
- 2024: Earth & Sky: A Great Gathering for All Beings
- 2025: The Gift
- 2026: The Wild Wisdom of the World

*Performed as Dreaming Dog Puppet Theatre

=== Artistic style ===
Paperhand uses a variety of puppetry styles and are known for their giant puppets, shadow puppetry, masks, and stilt dancing. Their puppets are constructed using a combination of papier-mâché, cardboard, clay, bamboo, paint, cloth, among other discarded or donated materials. Their shows feature a live band composed of instruments such as cello, drum, guitar, cymbal, chimes, violin, accordion, and flute along with vocalists to perform background music, musical numbers, and foley. The group performs frequently in outdoor venues, parades, local celebrations, and protests.
