= Beaver Creek Indians =

State-recognized tribe in South Carolina

- Official logo of the Beaver Creek Indians
- Named after: tributaries of the Edisto River
- Formation: 1998; 28 years ago.
- Type: state-recognized tribe, nonprofit organization
- Tax ID no.: EIN 57-1063914
- Purpose: A80: Historical Societies, Historical Preservation
- Headquarters: Salley, South Carolina
- Location: United States
- Members: 950 (2006)
- Official language: English
- Leader: Louie Chavis
- Vice Chief: Helen Jeffcoat
- Website: beavercreekindians.org
- Formerly called: Beaver Creek Band of Pee Dee Indians

The Beaver Creek Indians, formerly known as the Beaver Creek Band of Pee Dee Indians, is a nonprofit organization, and state-recognized tribe headquartered in Salley, South Carolina. The organization was designated a state-recognized tribe by the South Carolina Commission of Minority Affairs on January 27, 2006.

The Beaver Creek Indians are among several state-recognized tribes within South Carolina. The organization is not to be confused with the Pee Dee Indian Nation of Beaver Creek, a state-recognized group designated by the South Carolina Commission of Minority Affairs in 2007.

== Organization ==
On January 28, 1998, the organization was first chartered as a nonprofit organization, being originally called the Beaver Creek Band of Pee Dee Indians. The Beaver Creek Indians are governed by a chief, vice chief, and council. Every two years the organization holds an election for these positions, each lasting for a term of four years, with the chief in one category and the vice-chief and council in another. Additionally, an elders council provides the council with consultation and advice. While the Beaver Creek traditionally inhabited lands near Neeses, South Carolina, the organization today is headquartered in Salley.

In 1999, the Pee Dee Indian Nation of Beaver Creek split from the organization following an administrative disagreement and was later recognized by the South Carolina Commission for Minority Affairs as an independent state-recognized group in 2007.

== Background ==
The Beaver Creek Indians say they descend from Pedee who served as Native American trade liaisons, then fought as Patriots in the American Revolutionary War. They have common origins and ancestry from Lazarus Chavis, who lived in the 1700s. The Croatan Indian tribe of Orangeburg also claims descent from Chavis. In an interview, the current chief stated some ancestors of the tribe were in the 22nd Infantry Company I of the Civil War, possessing similar surnames to modern membership. By the late 20th century they were referred to by various labels, such as Cherokees, Lumbees, Brass Ankles, Redbones, "mulattoes", or triracials. Chavis, Hutto, Williams, Barr, Bolin, Jackson, Hoover, Huffman, and Gleaton are names common within the tribe, and some interviewed members linked the tribe or themselves specifically to the Chavis family.

=== Culture and identity ===
In archived interviews by the University of South Carolina Lancaster, a few members of the tribe discussed either seeking out or becoming root doctors, and burial traditions of surrounding graves with seashells, sometimes specifically around Chavis graves. They also spoke about the Beaver Creek Baptist and Mt. Beulah Pentecostal Holiness churches, which have been previously noted to have played a large role in keeping them together as a community. The interviewees described them acting as schools for darker-skinned people in the area who could not attend local white schools, and referred to the Mt. Beulah school as "Four Pines". The handful of members gave accounts of their identities before tribal formation, ranging from either not thinking they were Native, not identifying with a specific tribe, or identifying as Cherokee. A few interviewees also discussed previously identifying themselves or family members as Native American specifically due to their visual appearances.

=== Formation and recognition ===
The Pee Dee region, within SC.

Beginning in 1965, Barry Chavis researched his family genealogy, later concluding he was Pedee after consulting websites online. In an interview, he also credited individuals involved in early tribal organization who had spoken of their relation to Chavises in the Pee Dee region. By the late 1990s he was leading more than one hundred descendants of the Chavis, Williams, and Jones families, with other allied families. They began to meet in Neeses to plan to petition the government for recognition as the Beaver Creek Band of Pee Dee Indians. Chief Louie Chavis stated it was difficult and tedious to acquire enough birth certificate records for the recognition process, as the certificates were labelled "White" or "American" rather than "Indian".

The Beaver Creek Indians were designated a state-recognized tribe by the South Carolina Commission of Minority Affairs on January 27, 2006.

==== Federal recognition ====
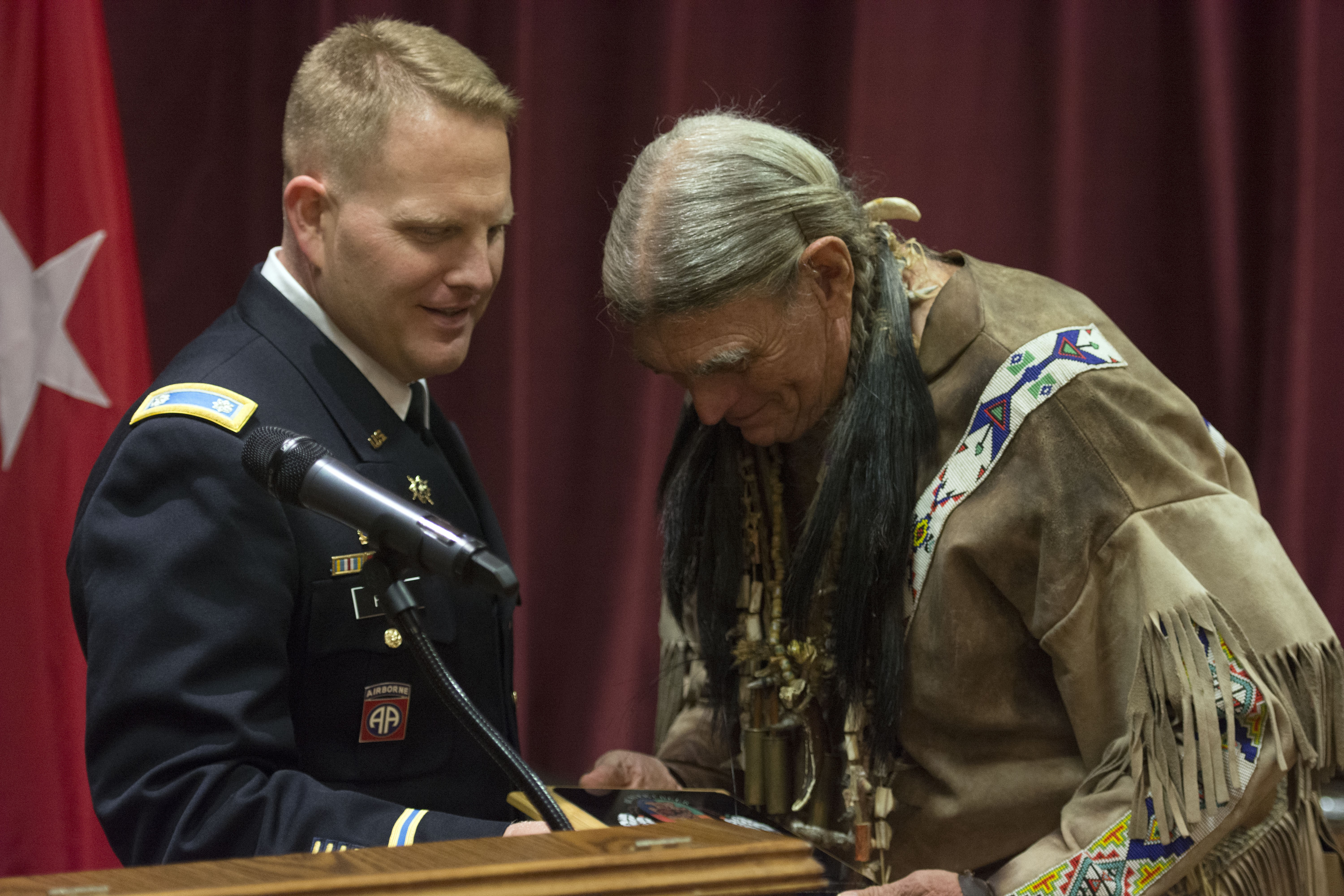
Chief Louie Chavis receiving gift at Fort Jackson luncheon.

The tribe submitted a letter of intent to the Bureau of Indian Affairs in 1998, which BIA historian Virginia DeMarce said would lead to recognition in five years in a best-case scenario. In 2000, members said it may take seven to eight years to achieve recognition. They were still seeking recognition in 2014.

== See also ==
- Santee Indian Organization
