= Wassamasaw Tribe of Varnertown Indians =

State-recognized tribe in South Carolina

- Official logo of the Wassamasaw Tribe of Varnertown Indians
- Named after: Wassamassaw Swamp, Berkeley County, SC
- Formation: March 7, 2001; 25 years ago
- Type: state-recognized tribe, nonprofit organization
- Tax ID no.: EIN 57-1121837
- Purpose: S20: Community, Neighborhood Development, Improvement
- Headquarters: Moncks Corner, SC
- Members: 1,500 (2005)
- Official language: English
- Leader: Lisa M. Collins
- Website: https://www.wassamasawtribe.com/
- Formerly called: Wassamasaw Tribe

The Wassamasaw Tribe of Varnertown Indians or Wassamasaw Tribe is a state-recognized tribe and 501(c)(3) nonprofit organization headquartered in Berkeley County, South Carolina. The organization was awarded the status of a state-recognized tribe by the South Carolina Commission of Minority Affairs in November 2009, becoming the sixth state-recognized tribe within South Carolina. They are not federally recognized as a Native American tribe by the Bureau of Indian Affairs. The Catawba Indian Nation is the only tribe in South Carolina that is federally recognized by the U.S. Government.

Members of the Wassamasaw Tribe claim descent from several Indigenous peoples of the Carolinas including the Etiwan, Edisto, Catawba, and Cherokee.

== Etymology ==
The Wassamasaw Tribe of Varnertown Indians derives its name from Wassamasaw Swamp, a cypress swamp located in Berkeley County, South Carolina, in close proximity to Moncks Corner, South Carolina. The name and its variants date back to the colonial era and is thought to mean "connecting water" in an unknown Indigenous language. The 'Wassamassaw' variant of the word is a palindromic place name.

Varnertown is the name of a historically distinct Indigenous community situated in Berkeley County, South Carolina. Varnertown derives its name from William and Mary Varner, who were progenitors of the community that lived during the early twentieth century. A historical marker erected by the Berkeley County Historical Society at Carnes Crossroads has commemorated Varnertown since 2007.

== Government ==
On March 7, 2001, the Wassamasaw Tribe of Varnertown Indians first formed as a nonprofit, being originally called the Wassamasaw Tribe. The nonprofit was recognized as a "state-recognized group" in 2005 prior to obtaining recognition as a state-recognized tribe. In November 2009, the Wassamasaw Tribe was recognized by the South Carolina Commission of Minority Affairs as a state-recognized tribe and in the same year became a 501(c)(3) organization. The tribe is governed by an Executive Board, which consists of the Chief, Vice Chief, and five elected Tribal Council members. Other appointed tribal positions include the Secretary, Treasurer, Tribal Archivist, Enrollment Officer, and Tribal Historian. All Executive Board positions are filled through election of the Tribal membership. All tribal offices are 4-year terms. The tribe also has a Council of Elders who serve in an advisory capacity to the Executive Board

== History ==
In 1977, members of Varnertown were relatively hostile to outsider investigators, unless they were of Indigenous descent, and did not openly express an interest in obtaining recognition as a tribe. The tribe was largely unknown, even to local historians, until the twenty-first century, having lived apart for generations along the road between Summerville and Moncks Corner. Historians have noted that while a great number of individuals of Indigenous descent live within the area of Berkeley County, the only distinct settlement is the community of Varnertown. During the late 1970s the Santees lived in communities known as White Oak of Orangeburg County and Varnertown of Berkeley County. The White Oak Indians, now state-recognized as the Santee Indian Organization, claimed jurisdiction over all Indigenous people of Berkeley County. A few residents of Varnertown were enrolled at White Oak Community during this time. Members of Varnertown independently organized in 2001 as a nonprofit in anticipation of South Carolina beginning to award official state-recognition to communities within the state. In 2005, the Wassmasaw Tribe was recognized as a "state-recognized group" by South Carolina and later became a "state-recognized Tribe" in 2009.

In 2009, the Wassamasaw numbered about 1,500 members, out of a total of 27,000 people that then identified as Native American in South Carolina. In order to be recognized by the South Carolina Commission for Minority Affairs as a state-recognized tribe, the Wassamasaw had to show that members had existed as a community for at least a century. While conducting research necessary for state-recognition, tribal members provided records showing that an "Indian Mary", who identified as an Edisto, married a Varnertown resident during the nineteenth century. This discovery led at least one columnist, Bo Petersen, to speculate that the modern Wassamasaw Tribe might be the last living link to the Edisto tribe, who were previously believed to have been so decimated during the colonial era by war and disease that no living trace of them remained.

In 1938, the WPA photographer Marion Post Wolcott took a photo of Geneva Varner Clark of Varnertown alongside her three children. Varner identified as Native American, referring to herself as a Summerville Indian. This is the only known photo of members of a Lowcountry Indigenous community housed in the Library of Congress. The caption of the photos identifies Varner as a Brass Ankle, a derogatory term used to refer to someone of mixed race that passes as white.

During the era of racial segregation, a state-supported Indian school, called the Varner School, existed in Varnertown between 1939 and 1962. Its enrollment varied between eleven and twenty-seven pupils at a time. The Varner School was always listed as a white school in official state records. Some members of the community also attended The Pine View Indian School that was established in 1934 at Ten Mile Hill area (present-day Rivers Avenue) in North Charleston.

The effects of the civil rights movement led members of that generation to reclaim their heritage, and descendants now increasingly identify as Wassamasaw. Tribal Administrator, Lisa Leach, now Collins, led the effort toward state-recognition for the tribe and this status was obtained in November 2009.

=== Heritage ===
The tribe also claims descent from remnants of the Catawba, Etiwan, Edisto, and Cherokee, who began to intermarry during the early eighteenth century following the Yamasee War. Members of the Wassamasaw Tribe has been considered more racially mixed than individuals from other Lowcountry Indigenous communities, having over the course of the past two centuries gradually intermarried with their European American and African American neighbors. The three most predominate surnames associated with Varnertown are Varner, Dangerfield, and Clark. During the 1930s, Filipino immigrants who had come to South Carolina via the Charleston Naval Shipyard also married into the tribe. This introduced surnames like Alfaro, Garcia, Ricafrente, Bugaisan, Villanova, Rameres, Surrell, and Soreano into the community. The small amount of Filipino ancestry in other Indigenous communities in the Lowcountry, comes from intermarriage with members of Varnertown.

== Other activities ==
Historically, the Wassamasaw lost touch with their culture and crafts but have been working to revive lost traditions since the 1960s. Since becoming state-recognized, the Wassamasaw can sell arts and crafts identified as "Native American".

The Wassamasaw Tribal Council have continued to spread awareness through the greater community of Monck's Corner, Summerville, Goose Creek, Charleston, and North Charleston with yearly Native American Heritage Month Proclamations since 2018.

The Wassamasaw Tribe is working to preserving their land and cultural heritage in Berkeley & Dorchester counties as they confront increasing pressures on their community. Chief Lisa Collins of the tribe expressed concerns about rising property taxes and the challenges youth face in affording to live in the community. The tribe also faces challenges with county grants, as new developments have changed the greater community’s economic status without improving the native community.

Members of the Wassamasaw have given presentations at Edisto Beach State Park, as part of the South Carolina Department of Natural Resources' public event series.

In 2022 the Wassamasaw Tribe began receiving letters of support from the surrounding Cities and Towns for their Federal Recognition. On 7/28/23 Representative Nancy Mace introduced a bill to extend Federal Recognition to the Wassamasaw Tribe of Varnertown Indians.

== See also ==
- Filipino Americans
- Overseas Filipinos
- Brass Ankles
- Cherokee heritage groups
- Cusabo
- Ittiwan people
- Santee Indian Organization
