= Santee Indian Organization =

State-recognized tribe in South Carolina, United States

- Official logo of the Santee Indian Organization
- Named after: Santee people Santee River
- Formation: October 6, 1975; 51 years ago
- Type: state-recognized tribe, nonprofit organization
- Headquarters: Holly Hill, SC
- Location: United States
- Members: 600 (2006)
- Official language: English
- Leader: Eric Pratt
- Formerly called: Santee Indian Tribe of South Carolina

The Santee Indian Organization or Santee Indian Tribe is a state-recognized tribe and nonprofit organization headquartered in Holly Hill, South Carolina. The state of South Carolina awarded the organization the state-recognized tribe designation under the SC Code Section 1-31-40 (A) (7)(10), Statutory Authority Chapter 139 (100–110) on January 27, 2006. Since having obtained state-recognition the tribe remains federally unrecognized by the Bureau of Indian Affairs.

Members of the Santee Indian Organization are descendants of the White Oak Indian Community, a historically documented isolated multi-tribal population of Indigenous people located in eastern Orangeburg County, South Carolina. The tribe predominantly identifies its lineage from the historic Santee and Pedee people of South Carolina, with some members also claiming Cherokee heritage in addition to connections to other Lowcountry tribes due to recent intermarriages.

== Government ==
On October 6, 1975, the Santee Indian Organization first chartered as a nonprofit organization, being originally called the Santee Indian Tribe of South Carolina. The tribe's government officially chartered for the purposes of promoting community facilities, fellowship, and charitable assistance among community members. It was not until January 27, 2006, that the state of South Carolina awarded the tribe state-recognized tribal status, acknowledging its tribal governance in accordance with SC Code Section 1-31-40 (A) (7)(10) and Statutory Authority Chapter 139 (100–110). The Santee Indian Organization is governed by a tribal council and governmental authority unique to Native Americans, as specified within the South Carolina regulations for state-recognition as a "Tribe".

== History ==
The Santee Indian Organization has its roots in the historic White Oak Indian Community of Holly Hill, originally known as Crane Pond during the 19th century. It first appears in the 1850 United States census in the northern end of the old parish of St. James Goose Creek, which is also the present location of the community. During this time, many residents of Crane Pond migrated and intermarried with other local Indigenous communities in the Lowcountry. This led to the formation of modern connections between the Santee Indian Organization, the Edisto Natchez-Kusso Tribe, and the Wassamasaw Tribe of Varnertown Indians. Within the White Oak Community, several prominent surnames emerged, including Russell, Sweat, Scott, Crummie, and Pye.

Notably, the Pratt family maintains a tradition that the brothers John, Preston, and Miles Pratt, purportedly full-blooded Cherokees from North Carolina, married into the community during the Crane Pond era. By the early 20th century, descendants of John Pratt, notably his children and grandchildren, changed their surname to Platt.

By 1922, the White Oak community operated its own segregated, state-supported school. However, it wasn't until 1930 that the residents of White Oak were officially classified as 'Indian' in the federal census, which recorded 134 'Indians' in Orangeburg County. The presence of the community in this era is shown by state highway department maps, which consistently marked the 'Indian Church' north of Holly Hill from 1938 onwards. The segregated school, which then had more than eighty pupils enrolled, closed in 1966. Throughout its operation, it was listed as a white school in all of the state's school directories.

Beginning in the early 1970s the governor's office began to encourage the Santee, Catawba, Edisto, and Pee Dee Indian Tribe to express their needs and helped these communities obtain federal and state funds. From the administration of James B. Edwards onward, members of these communities benefited from several federal programs and block grants administered through the governor's office. By the late 1970s it was concluded the main problem with South Carolina's Indigenous populations was isolation with most suffering from substandard housing and inadequate water systems. Before officially obtaining a non-profit charter on October 6, 1975, the Santee Indian Organization, then called the Santee Indian Tribe of South Carolina, announced their intention to form as an eleemosynary corporation through a public notice published on September 29, 30, and October 1, 1975. This notice, formally outlined the tribe's goals of promoting community facilities, fellowship, charitable assistance, and announced an inaugural meeting scheduled for October 9, 1975, at the Indian Church of God in Holly Hill. The notice, a significant step in the tribe's formal organization, was signed by Jimmie Pratt and Floyd Crummie, who were key figures in this process.

On June 4, 1979, the Santee Indian Organization, then led by Randy Crummie, submitted a Letter of Intent to Petition for federal recognition to the Bureau of Indian Affairs.

During the early 1980s, many members moved away for employment, primarily for work in blue-collar jobs, and to avoid facing long commutes to major cities like Charleston. The community consisted primarily of mobile homes or small cement block houses, surrounded by about a mile and a half of woods and farmland. This sort of geographic isolation led to reduced economic opportunities for tribal members. Employment challenges were also partly attributed to racial discrimination in areas like Holly Hill and Eutawville, South Carolina. Then Assistant Chief T.L. Scott noted the local discrimination but acknowledged gradual improvements with the younger, less race-conscious generation. The tribe's leadership in this era was particularly focused on gaining state-recognition and revitalizing pride among members of the tribe.

Beginning in 1983, the Santee, alongside several other local unrecognized tribes, engaged in a concerted effort for state-recognition in South Carolina. Their initial bid in 1983 was unsuccessful, but the cause was reinvigorated in 1986 with the introduction of a new bill. Despite several setbacks, a significant step forward occurred in this year when the governor established an Indian Commission, with representatives from the Santee Indian Organization, Pee Dee Indian Tribe, and Edisto Natchez-Kusso Tribe, all officially appointed by the governor. However, it was not until January 27, 2006, that the Santee Tribe finally achieved official state-recognition under South Carolina Code Section 1-31-40 (A) (7)(10), as per Statutory Authority Chapter 139 (100–110).

=== Platt family harassment ===
In 1954, Allen Platt and Laura Dangerfield Platt, descendants of the community residing in Lake County, Florida, claimed Cherokee and Irish ancestry. Their family's story gained national attention in a 1955 Ebony magazine article titled 'Florida Sheriff Calls White Family Black'. This piece detailed an incident where Sheriff Willis V. McCall forcibly entered the Platt family's home at night, acting on reports that some of the children appeared to be of African descent and were passing as white. During this raid, Sheriff McCall lined up the seven Platt children, photographed them, and subjected them to an impromptu assessment of their racial background. Disapproving of one child's nose shape and deeming five children's complexions and hair texture too similar to those of African Americans, he declared them unfit for a whites-only school. As a result, the children with darker complexions were expelled from their school, and the family faced eviction from their home.

The Platt family endured ostracism, racial insults, and threats of violence following this incident. After relocating, their new house was set on fire. Determined to assert their identity, the Platts eventually sought and succeeded in obtaining legal recognition of their white racial status. The experience had a lasting impact on Mr. Platt, who, in his eighties, recounted to an Orlando Sentinel reporter, "I wouldn't have treated a dog the way they treated me".

=== Pedee heritage ===
Ethnohistorian Wes Taukchiray has proposed a link between the White Oak Indian community and an 18th-century settlement of Pedee people. According to his research, these Pedee settled on Four Hole Swamp by 1742 and were still present in 1753, potentially 4.4 miles southwest of modern Holly Hill. Members of the Santee Indian Organization allege descent from this historic settlement. This may suggest communal heritage that predates or is somehow intermingled with the established Santee identity. Taukchiray, however, has asserted that the tribe's name is more reflective of its geographic location, near the Santee River, than an indication of the community's genealogical descent from the historic Santee tribe.

== Other activities ==
The Santee Indian Organization has hosted an annual Family Fun Day and Powwow since 2012 at its tribal grounds near Holly Hill, South Carolina.

== See also ==
- Wassamasaw Tribe of Varnertown Indians
- Santee (South Carolina)
- Pedee people
- Brass Ankles
