= Waccamaw Indian People =

State-recognized tribe in South Carolina, United States

- Official logo of the Waccamaw Indian People
- Named after: Waccamaw people Waccamaw River
- Formation: October 28, 1992; 34 years ago
- Founder: Harold D. Hatcher
- Type: state-recognized tribe, nonprofit organization
- Tax ID no.: EIN 57-0970329
- Legal status: school, educational service provider, charity
- Purpose: B90: Educational Services
- Headquarters: Conway, South Carolina
- Location: United States
- Official language: English
- President: Cheryl Cail
- Website: www.waccamaw.org
- Formerly called: Chicora Indian Nation; Chicora-Waccamaw Indian People

The Waccamaw Indian People, formerly the Chicora-Waccamaw Indian People, is a state-recognized tribe and 501(c)(3) nonprofit organization headquartered in Conway, South Carolina. The organization was awarded the status of a state-recognized tribe by the South Carolina Commission of Minority Affairs on February 17, 2005, and holds the distinction of being the first state-recognized tribe within South Carolina. The Waccamaw Indian People are not federally recognized as a Native American tribe and are one of two organizations that allege to be descended from the historic Waccamaw, the other being the Waccamaw Siouan Indians, who have been a state-recognized tribe in North Carolina since 1971. The Tribal Council of the Waccamaw Siouan Indians has issued a public proclamation stating that the two tribes share no relationship or association, and that the North Carolina Waccamaw do not recognize the Waccamaw Indian People as an Indian tribe or tribal entity.

Members of the Waccamaw Indian People trace their origins to the Dimery Settlement, a racial isolate population once located near Dog Bluff in Horry County, first established during the early 19th century. Members of the organization allege that the Dimery Settlement originated as an 18th-century Waccamaw village. However, existent historical records can presently only demonstrate the settlement as being identified as an Indigenous community beginning in the early twentieth century.

== Organization and leadership ==
On October 28, 1992, the Chicora-Waccamaw Indian People first formed as a 501(c)(3) nonprofit organization, being originally called the Chicora Indian Nation. The organization was established following Harold D. "Buster" Hatcher's departure from the Chicora Indian Tribe of South Carolina due to a disagreement with then chief, Gene Martin, in October 1992. Hatcher was the organization's founder, president, agent, and inaugural chief. On July 10, 2026, Hatcher formally retired after leading the organization for over thirty years and was succeeded by Cheryl Cail.

In 2002, the organization voted to remove the term "Chicora" from its name to avoid confusion with the Chicora Indian Tribe.

On February 17, 2005, the Waccamaw Indian People was awarded the status of a state-recognized tribe by the SCCMA, becoming the first ever state-recognized tribe within South Carolina.

== Historic origins ==
Members of the Waccamaw Indian People trace lineal descent from the historic Dimery Settlement, an isolated population once located in Horry County near Dog Bluff. The Dimery family are considered to have comprised a distinct racial isolate population, being descended from African, European, and Native American ancestors. Hatcher and many members of the Waccamaw Indian People descend from John Dimery, who is said to have founded the settlement near modern Aynor, South Carolina during the early 19th century.

=== Early research efforts ===
In the fall of 1994, historian Forest Hazel was hired to assist the Chicora-Waccamaw Indian People, supported by a grant from the Administration for Native Americans, in compiling historical documentation for their federal recognition bid. During his research, Hazel explored various local theories about the origins of the Dimery Settlement's origins, including the idea that community members might have been the descendants of the historic Waccamaw people, a foreign population of Spaniards or Portuguese, an amalgamation of Civil War deserters, runaway slaves, and Native Americans who settled near Gunter's Island, or an offshoot of the Lumbee people of Robeson County, North Carolina, referred to as "Croatan" by locals. Hazel was unable to substantiate any of these theories with historical records available at the time of his research.

Research was able to confirm that the settlement's patriarch, John Dimery, first appears marrying his wife, Elizabeth Hardwick, in Marion County, South Carolina in 1809 and by 1813 had moved to Horry County, where he purchased three hundred acres from William Lewis. Dimery was classified as a "free colored" in the 1850 United States census, presumably residing near Dog Bluff. This census also indicates that John Dimery was born in North Carolina. It was speculated that he may have been born in Anson or Columbus County, North Carolina due to the presence of individuals carrying the Dimery surname in these regions at the time. Hazel noted the possibility of Indigenous people inhabiting the Dog Bluff area at the time Dimery's arrival, given the nearby late Woodland Period village site near Jordanville, with excavated pottery shards dating to the 17th century. Yet, this theory, in Hazel's opinion, lacked concrete evidence and was not able to be supported by hard fact. Members of the Dimery Settlement, as evidenced in historical records from the 19th century, led lives comparable to their neighbors, showing no distinctive Indigenous customs or language, and were to some limited extent integrated into the local rural society.

=== "Cheraw descent" ===
Hazel investigated several other prominent surnames within the community, such as Hatcher. He discovered a broad connection of this family to early 18th-century traders operating along the North Carolina-Virginia border, known for their dealings with various Carolinian tribes. Findings also included the presence of Hatchers, Dimerys, and Coopers within the Lumbee Tribe. Specifically, he traced the Lumbee Coopers back to Marlboro County and noted their claims of Cheraw ancestry. Hazel postulated that many of these families, including those prominent in the Dimery Settlement, likely originated near the historical Cheraw settlement in Marlboro County.

=== "Croatans" ===
During the era of segregation, the community maintained its own church, and later a school, as members of the settlement refused to send their children to schools built for local African American children. During this era members were often referred to as "free coloreds" or "croatans". The settlement was the subject of speculation in newspapers within Horry County during the early 20th century, particularly regarding the racial origins of its inhabitants. This uncertainty fostered a local mystery and led to several legal cases when residents of the settlement were accused of marrying outside of their race due to anti-miscegenation laws of the time.

=== Lumbee ancestry and kinship ties ===
Following the work of Forest Hazel, researchers into the 21st Century have continued to emphasize the fluidity of movement among racially mixed populations across Horry, Marlboro, Dillon, and neighboring Robeson County, North Carolina. Group of interrelated communities of Lumbee descent are spread throughout northeastern South Carolina, along the North Carolina–South Carolina border, and have been documented in Dillon, Marlboro, Marion, Chesterfield, and Horry County. These communities descend from Lumbee ancestors from Robeson County, North Carolina, who migrated across state lines into South Carolina during the 19th century.

Lumber River, historically known as Drowning Creek, as seen in Lumberton, NC

S. Pony Hill has noted that genealogical research has proven that members of the Waccamaw Indian People are often closely related, within one or two generations, to families such as the Ammons, Coopers, Dimerys, Hatchers, and Turners in McColl, Clio, Maxton, and Pembroke. Hill highlights that John Dimery Sr., the ancestor of the Waccamaw Indian People, lived near Drowning Creek, in present-day Robeson County, from at least 1780 to 1795, where he was taxed and listed on census schedules as a Free Person of Color. Around 1795, Dimery sold his property in North Carolina and relocated to Marlboro County, where he lived among other families of Lumbee descent before moving east to Dog Bluff. His brother, William Dimery, remained in Marlboro County and became an ancestor to many modern members of the state-recognized Pee Dee Indian Tribe, formerly known as the Pee Dee Lumbee Indian Association.

The U.S. Federal Census in 1850 shows that John Dimery Jr., who had earlier married Elizabeth Hardwick in Marlboro, was living in the household of his father, John Dimery Sr. The birthplace and early residence of John Dimery Sr. in North Carolina further support his ties to the Robeson area. Hill's research also found that during the Civil War, other Lumbee families, including the Ammons, Coopers, Hatchers, and Turners, joined the Dog Bluff settlement. The Hatcher family descends from David Hatcher, the progenitor of the Hatcher surname among members of both the modern Pee Dee Indian Tribe and the Waccamaw Indian People. David Hatcher, a "half Indian" planter, moved into the area around 1810 after having earlier enlisted in the North Carolina militia in Granville County, North Carolina.

Despite extensive research over the past thirty years failing to validate the Dimery Settlement's descent from the historic Waccamaw people, it has been noted by Hill that the tribe currently emphasizes this claim while deemphasizing documented connections to the Lumbee. The state-recognized Waccamaw Siouan Indians near Lake Waccamaw, North Carolina have issued a public proclamation stating that their members share no genealogical relationship with members of the Waccamaw Indian People.

== Pursuit of federal recognition ==
On October 5, 1994, while still named the Chicora-Waccamaw People, the organization submitted a letter of intent to submit a petition for federal acknowledgement of existence as a tribe to the Bureau of Indian Affairs.

In 2021, US Representatives Tom Rice and Nancy Mace (R-SC-7) introduced HR 1942 Waccamaw Indian Acknowledgment Act to attempt to secure federal recognition for the organization. However, no vote ever happened, and the bill was never mentioned during its two years in Congress.

As of December 2023, the office of U.S. Representative Russell Fry has been actively engaged in discussions and collaborative efforts with both the Waccamaw Indian People, supporting their pursuit of federal recognition.

== Chicora name dispute ==
Before the Waccamaw Indian People, formerly called the Chicora Indian Nation, chose to formally remove the term "Chicora" from its name, there were public disputes and legal confrontations over the organization's use of this term. A key incident occurred in 1993 between Chief Gene Martin of the Chicora Indian Tribe and Second-Chief Bill "Kicking Bear" Fowler of the Chicora-Waccamaw. The dispute escalated into a public altercation at a powwow hosted by the Lumbee Tribe in Pembroke, North Carolina. The focus of the dispute was on the right to use the "Chicora" name. Subsequently, Martin faced disorderly conduct charges, which were dismissed due to the incident occurring outside of Horry County's jurisdiction. Martin, citing his organization's entitlement to the term "Chicora", considered filing a civil suit against the Chicora-Waccamaw for a name change. Hatcher defended local use of the term "Chicora", stating the term was a regional designation rather than being an assertion of tribal heritage or identity. In 1994 Hatcher publicly expressed that he and Martin had put their dispute over the use of the name "Chicora" behind them. Later, in 2002, the Waccamaw Indian People dropped "Chicora" from the organization's name by popular vote in order to avoid being confused with the Chicora Indian Tribe.

== Other activities ==
In 2004, the Waccamaw Indian People acquired twenty acres that once comprised part of the historic Dimery Settlement near Dog Bluff. This land is referred to as the "Waccamaw Tribal Grounds" and is used by the organization to host cultural events and an annual powwow every November.

The Horry County Museum showcased the exhibition The Waccamaw Indian People: Past, Present, and Future in 2021.

== See also ==
- Waccamaw Siouan Indians
- Chicora
- Lumbee
