= John Barnwell (colonist) =

American colonist

Coat of Arms of John Barnwell

John Barnwell (c. 1671–1724), also known as Tuscarora Jack, was an Anglo-Irish soldier who emigrated to the Province of South Carolina in 1701. He led an army against the Tuscarora in 1711–1712. Later, he served the colony as an official in talks with England in forming the government. He also worked to revive the relationship between the colony and its former allies the Yamasee.

== Life ==
Barnwell's exact origins are uncertain. By the time the Tuscarora War began in 1712, Barnwell had become an important official of the colony. He led one army of colonial militia and allied Native Americans in campaigns. South Carolina sent two armies against the Tuscarora in North Carolina, the first of which Barnwell commanded in campaigns in late 1711 and early 1712. The army was made up mostly of Indians, especially Yamasee. Barnwell defeated the Tuscarora and arranged a peace treaty, after which his army disbanded.

Hostilities between the Tuscarora and North Carolina resumed, and South Carolina sent a second army. North Carolina officials, blaming Barnwell for failing to destroy the Tuscarora, specifically requested another leader to command the second army. Barnwell was popularly known as "Tuscarora Jack" or "Tuscarora John" for his role in the war.

In 1715, the Yamasee War broke out between colonists of South Carolina and the Yamasee and allied tribes. The Yamasee first attacked colonists near Port Royal. A survivor managed to flee to Port Royal Island, the main island, and sound the alarm. Barnwell and other colonists living on the island escaped by ship to Charles Town.

When South Carolina overthrew the colonial proprietors and arranged to become a royal colony, John Barnwell travelled to London to represent the colony and help form the new government. After returning to South Carolina, he spent many years working for renewal of friendship with the Yamasee, who had migrated south to Spanish Florida. In 1721, Barnwell had a fortified outpost, named Fort King George, on the Altamaha River, in an attempt to check the Spanish influence on the region and its Indians. He was never able to achieve a renewal of the old Yamasee-British alliance.
