= Catawban languages =

Language family of eastern US

Catawban
- Eastern Siouan
- Geographic distribution: The Carolinas
- Linguistic classification: Siouan-Catawban: Catawban
- Subdivisions: Catawba †; Woccon †

Language codes
- Glottolog: cata1285
- Linguasphere: 64-AB
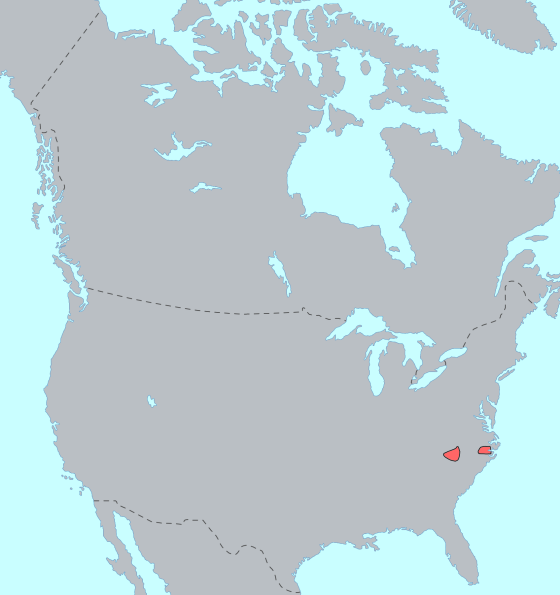
- Pre-contact distribution of the Catawban languages

The Catawban branch consists of a subset of various historical languages in the Siouan–Catawban language family, within the Appalachian Plateau and Piedmont regions of present-day Virginia and the Carolinas. These languages are sometimes collectively referred to as Eastern Siouan.

The two attested Catawban languages were historically spoken by the Catawba and Woccon peoples. While early scholars such as John R. Swanton suggested that the Woccon may have represented a late subdivision of the Waccamaw, contemporary linguists have not reached a consensus on whether Woccon was the specific language of the historic Waccamaw people or a related Catawban variety. The Catawban languages have been hypothesized by some to represent a dialect continuum with Ohio Valley Siouan languages (Ofo language/Mosopelea, Biloxi language). The Catawban family is a branch of the larger Siouan–Catawban language family.

== Family division ==
Recognized members of the Catawban language family include:

1. Catawba (†) – spoken by the Catawba people
2. Woccon (†) – spoken by the Woccon people, possibly Waccamaw
