= Cheraw =

Historical Native American tribe from the Carolinas, U.S.

Cheraw Saraw
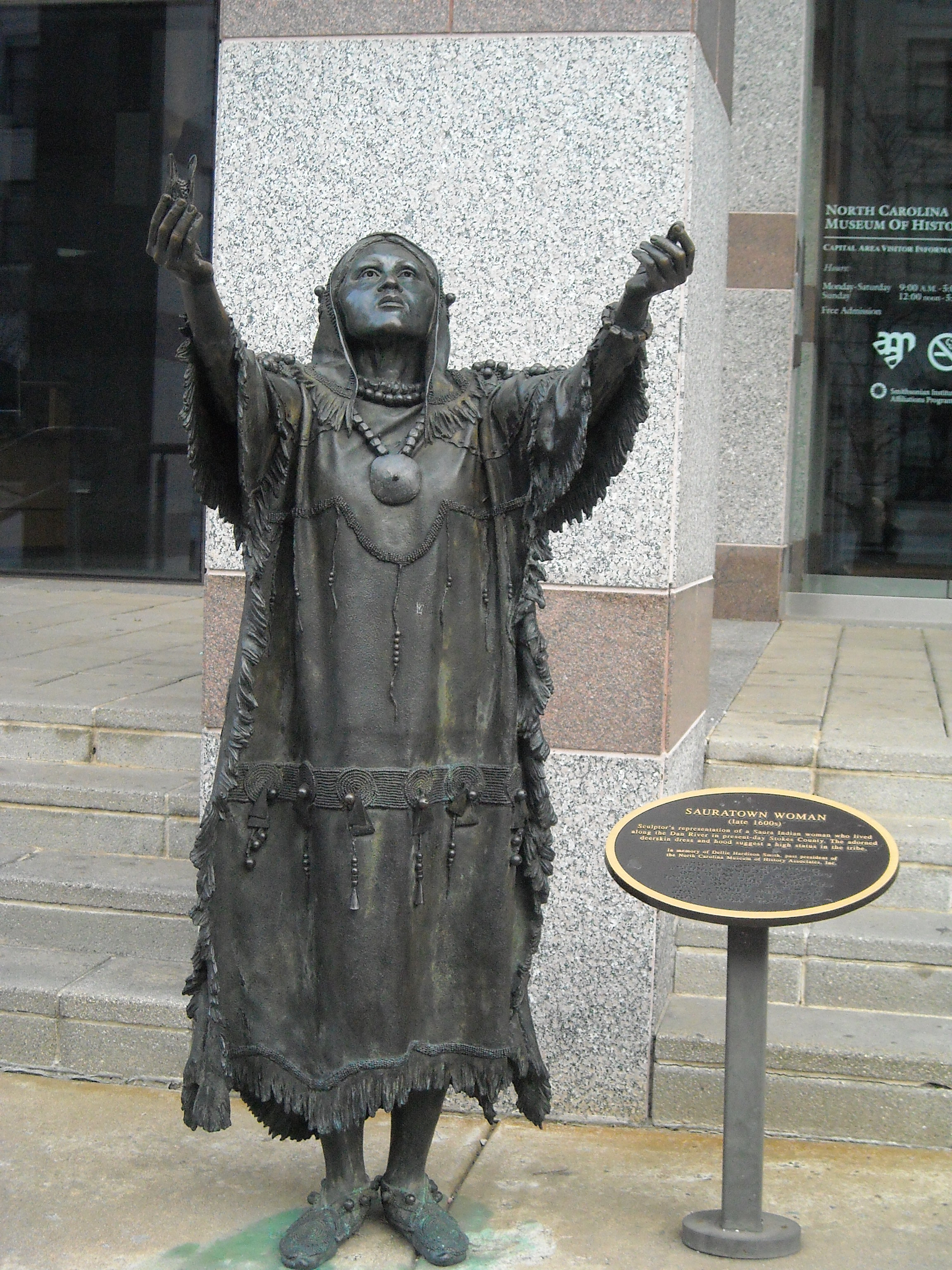
- Statue of a Dan River Sauratown woman at the North Carolina Museum of History.

Total population
- Extinct as independent tribe, merged into the Catawba Indian Nation.
- 1715 (census): 510
- 1756 (est.): 56 (only soldiers tallied)

Regions with significant populations
- (United States) United States; Historically in North Carolina associated with Joara, and later along the Pee Dee River in South Carolina, before assimilating with the Catawba people near Rock Hill.

Languages
- Unattested, possibly a Catawban language, presumably Saraw dialect of Catawba after merger.

Religion
- Native American religion

Related ethnic groups
- Catawba, Joara, Saponi, Waccamaw, Pedee, Waxhaw

The Cheraw people, also known as the Saraw or Saura, were a tribe of Indigenous people of the Southeastern Woodlands, in the Piedmont region of North Carolina near the Sauratown Mountains, east of Pilot Mountain and north of the Yadkin River. They lived in villages near the Catawba River. Their language is unattested but might have belonged to the Catawban language family.

The first settler contact with the ancestors of the Cheraw was during the 1540 Hernando De Soto Expedition, in Joara. Later, English settler John Lawson, in his 1709 book A New Voyage to Carolina, included them as members of the Catawba Confederacy which he called "the Esaw Nation." After attacks in the late 17th century and early 18th century, they moved to the southeast on the Pee Dee River, where the Cheraw name became more widely used.

They were finally adopted into the Catawba Nation after migrating to their settlement, where their language may have become the Saraw dialect of Catawba.

== Etymology ==
An early attested ethnonym was Sara, although they later became known by the name of one of their villages, Cheraw, after the Yamasee War of 1715–17. They are also known as the Charáh, Charrows, Charra, Charaws, Charraw, Charraws, Chara, Joara, Juada, Sara, Saraw, Saura, Suali, Sualy, Xualla, Sarrah, and Xuala. Xuala was Joara in Spanish.

=== Sara/Saraw to Charraw ===
The first mention of the term "Charraw" was by Thomas Lamboll in 1716, and he exclusively uses it as a label from 1716 to 1718. During the same time, other documents referred to the tribe as Saraw, and Sawra. Afterwards, Cheraw on the Pee Dee were referred to as Charraw in colonial South Carolinian records.

==== Regional placename ====
The South Carolina Gazette used the term "Charraw" both to refer to the Cheraw, and to the region of the Pee Dee River they lived in, a methodology that only ended in 1775. The Cheraw had relocated to live among the Catawba by 1738.

This region, which now encompasses present-day Chesterfield, Marlboro, Darlington, and parts of Lancaster counties, was known later in the 18th and 19th centuries as "The Cheraws"/"The Charraws", the "Cheraw Hills", and later the "Old Cheraws." The area was also known as the Cheraw District.

== Language ==
The Cheraw are guessed to have spoken a Catawban language, but their language is unattested. Scholars Brooke M. Bauer and Blair A. Rudes write they spoke a Catawban language.

Rudes wrote that over time linguistic differences in the Catawba-Wateree Valley settled into the dialects of Esaw and Saraw. Scholar Ives Goddard wrote the Saraw and Esaw dialects of Catawba presumably descend specifically from the Cheraw and the Esaw. Both dialects lasted into the 20th century.

== History ==
=== Catawba River polities and Spanish contact (1540–1567) ===
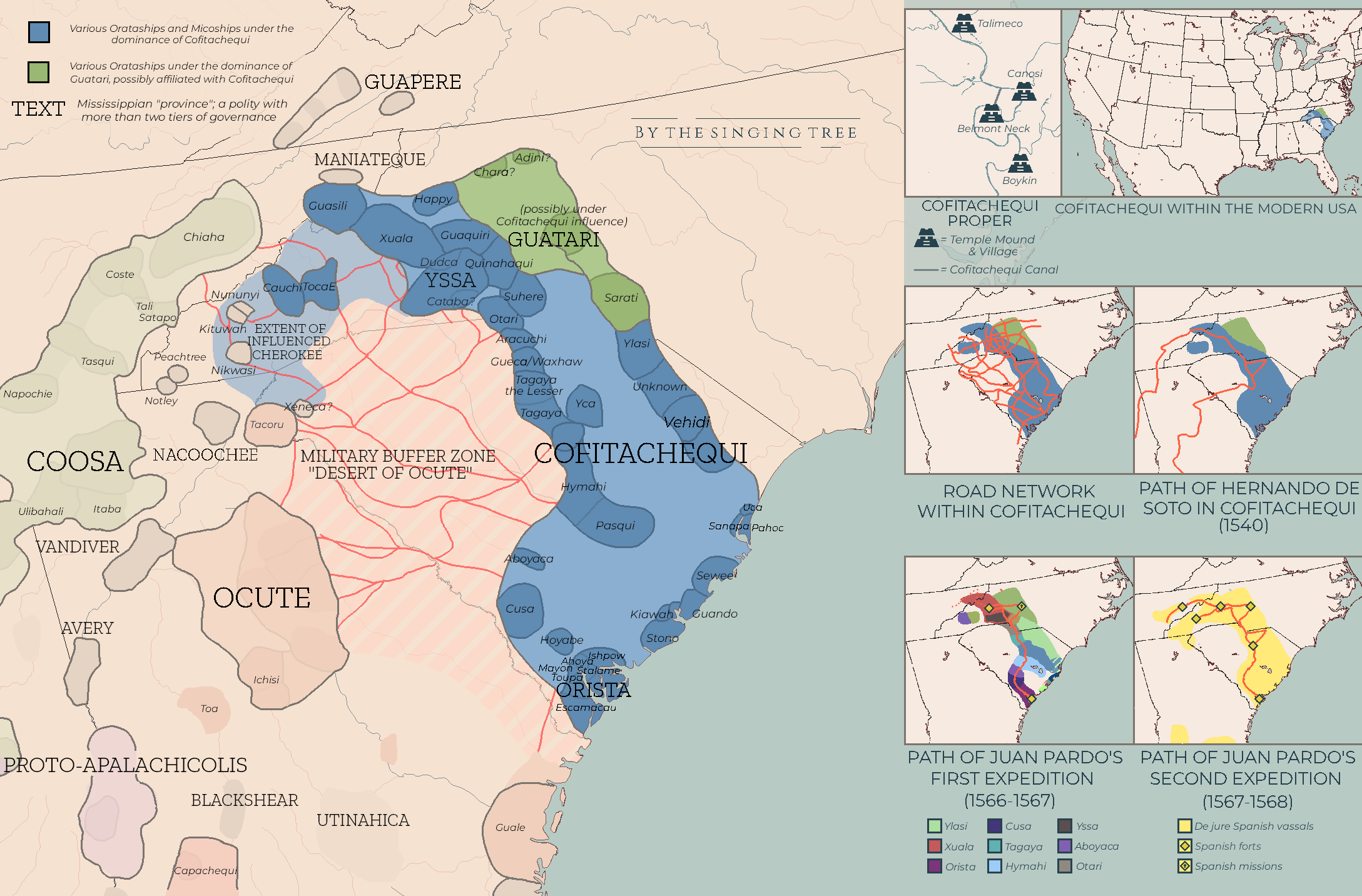
Ysa (Yssa), Charra (Chara), Catapa (Cataba), Wateree (Guatari), and Joara (Xuala) in 1540.

The Carolina Piedmont rotated power between three chiefdoms in the 16th century, Joara (es: Xuala), Cofitachequi, and Guatari. Cofitachequi was paramount when Hernando De Soto visited in 1540. Later during the Juan Pardo expedition of 1566-1567, power had shifted to the younger chiefdoms of Joara and Guatari.

Scholars Brooke M. Bauer, Blair A. Rudes, and Ives Goddard equate the polities of Charra and Joara with the Cheraw. Goddard and Rudes suggested Charra (Cheraw) lived in the Joara (Saraw) towns on the Dan River. They both concluded they were alternatively called by either name while on the Pee Dee River, before finally being called Cheraw. (Note: Goddard sometimes referred to this grouping as the Cheraw-Saraw. Rudes suggested there were still Cheraw and Saraw factions within the settlement on the Pee Dee River.)

==== Joara (Xuala) ====
Joara was located on the upper Catawba River, near Morganton, North Carolina. Their town was close to those of the Pedee and Catawba. The settlement functioned as a trade center on the river, and was relatively prosperous. They traded copper and salt with other Native Americans. De Soto's chroniclers noted they possessed low stocks of grain, similarly to other settlements.

In 1567, Charra, Catapa, and Ysa Oratas met with Juan Pardo in Joara. (Note: Bauer writes Joara is thought to have spoken a Catawban language.) The Orata (cacique) of Charra told Pardo he wished to shift his tributary allegiance from Guatari to Joara. This is the first documented relationship between Charra and Joara. Bauer writes modern ethnic divisions did not exist at this time in the area, and that tribes lived together, sharing political and kinship relationships.

Joara was identified as Hoada in 1605 by local tribes, after which documentation of the chiefdom ends. Scholar Robin A. Beck Jr. suggests that the archaeological record shows the upper Catawba River depopulating by the mid 1600s. Bauer states the centralized polities of Joara and Guatari ceased by the 1700s, but their descendants remained in the area, forming new networks via kinship alliances.

=== Settlement on the Yadkin and Dan rivers (1670–1710) ===
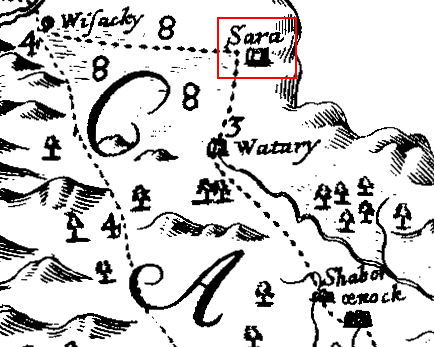
Section of John Lederer's 1671 map, depicting the Sara (labelled), Watary, Oenock, and Wisacky settlements.

In 1670, the Cheraw left their homes near present-day Asheville to settle on the lower Yadkin River (then called the Dan River) in Rockingham County. Sara and Occaneechi settlements had defensive palisades in the late seventeenth century.

The explorer John Lederer documented the Cheraw as a Sara town on his 1671 map. He placed them within the Piedmont along with the towns of Ushery, Wisacky, Watary, and Oenock. The town of Sara was located north of the Catawba River, near Watary. The settlements had not moved significantly since the time of John Pardo. Beck suggests the Sara town was Joara, moved 100 miles to the east of the upper Catawba River. Douglas L. Rights suggested the Saratown encountered by Lederer was on the Trading Ford of the Yadkin River. John Lawson did not encounter the Saratown in when retracing Lederer's path in 1701, suggesting their departure.

Rudes wrote that it was possible the upper and lower Sauratowns represented a Saraw-Chara division. The Keyauwee lived south of them on the Yadkin River. Houses at the Dan River Saratown were circular, and their pottery was burnished, smoothed, and net-impressed.

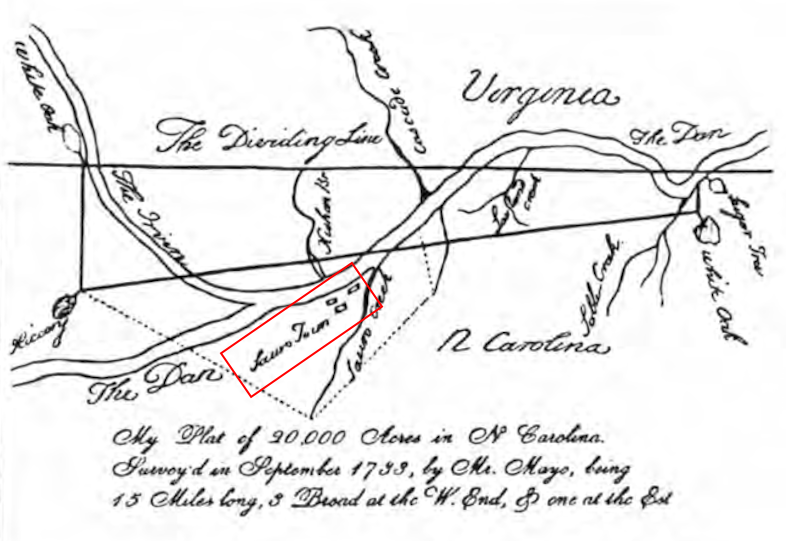
1733 survey plat, with an abandoned Cheraw settlement (Saura Town) highlighted on the Dan River. The Cheraw had left to the Pee Dee River decades earlier.

==== Later period ====
The final Saratown settlement on the Dan River was occupied between 1670 and 1710. Unlike previous Saratown settlements, it was not within a palisade, instead spread out over an area of 6.5 acres. Scholar Mary Elizabeth Fitts suggests the varieties of pottery present at the site imply the settlement had accepted refugees from other tribes.

Fitts states the Cheraw (labelled Sara) lived on the Dan River when James Needham and Gabriel Arthur had visited. After murdering Needham, the Occaneechi attempted to incite the Cheraw against Arthur, but he escaped. Abraham Wood described the Dan as the "Sarrah River" when describing their journey in 1674.

Colonist James Stewart complained of them stealing from traders. Historian Alan Gallay writes kin ties between traders and the Cheraw would have prevented this theft, but they did not intermarry with traders. The Province of Carolina began supplying the Cheraw and other tribes with more firearms in response to Shawnee raids on Native Americans in the Piedmont.

==== Emigration from the Dan River ====
Westo raided the Sara, pushing them nearer to the Iswa. In 1710, due to northern attacks by members of the Haudenosaunee Confederacy (Seneca), the Cheraw (Sara) moved southeast from the Dan River and formed settlements with the Keyauwee on the Pee Dee River. Together these settlements were known as Cheraw. The archaeological record shows an increase in local disease rates in the years before the settlements were abandoned.

=== Settlement on the Pee Dee River and Tuscarora War (1711–1715) ===
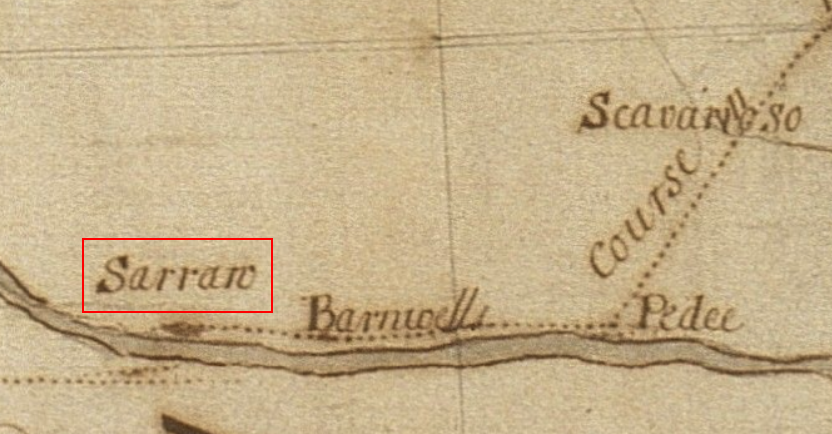
1721 copy of Barnwell's map by William Hammerton. The Cheraw settlement is highlighted on his route, labelled Sarraw on the Pee Ree River. The Pedee can be seen upriver on the right.

The first mention of the Cheraw on the Pee Dee River was in 1711, living approximately at the location of modern-day Cheraw, South Carolina. (Note: Rudes suggests the Cheraw town on the Pee Dee may have occupied the former site of Ylasi. Ylasi was a town encountered by De Soto and last mentioned in 1671 as Elaisie, a local tribe.) Rudes wrote the Saraw and Chara merged into the Cheraw at this point, resulting in confusion between the town names of Cheraw and Saraw on the historic record.

Historian Alan Gallay describes the approximate location of the Saura (Cheraw) settlement as "about 60 miles upriver from the Peedees", whose home is described as "on the Peedee River about 80 miles west of the coast".

==== Enlistment in Captain Bull's company and aftermath ====
The Cheraw were recorded in The Journal of Barnwell as maintaining a town on the east bank of the upper branches of the Pee Dee River circa the Tuscarora War in 1712. Barnwell's map suggests it was at the fall line, near modern-day Cheraw, South Carolina. Forty-two Cheraws fought with colonizers in the Tuscarora War.

In 1712, John Barnwell led a force of 400 to 500 troops against the Tuscarora in North Carolina. Almost all his forces were Indians, organized into four companies. The units included Catawba, Waxaw, Wateree, and Congaree, among others. Captain Bull's company was of "northern Indians" who lived farther from Charles Town and whose allegiance was not strong. Among this group were 42 Saraw, 22 Saxapahaw, 18 Pedee, 11 Cape Fear, 11 Hoopengs, and others. This company was noted for high levels of early desertion. Gallay has speculated that the Saraw (Cheraw) and Saxapahaw deserted Barnwell's army because their towns were likely to be attacked by the Tuscarora in vengeance for assisting colonizers in the war. Prior to the Yamasee War, the village had 140 men, and 370 women and children.

=== Yamasee War (1715–1717) ===
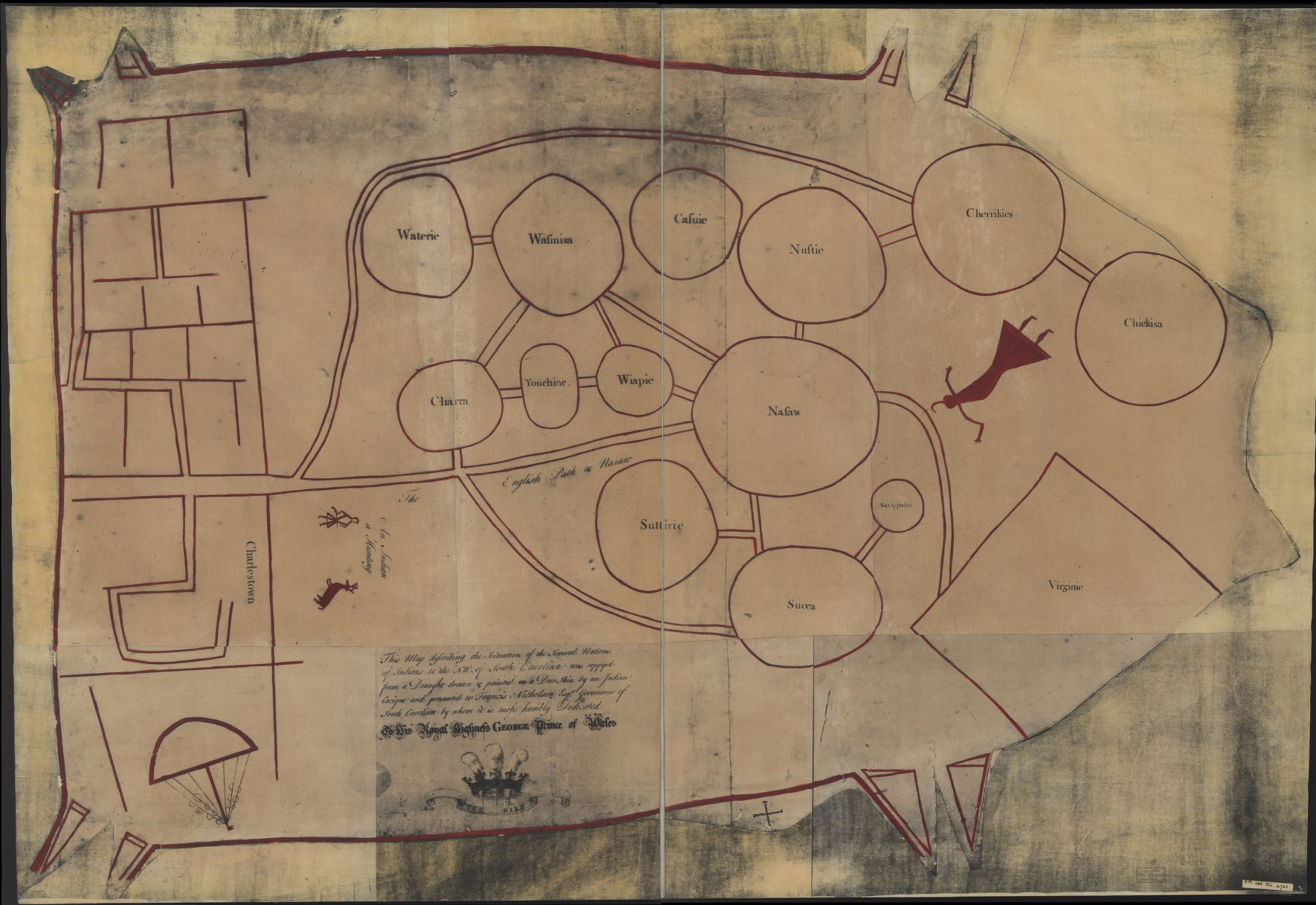
Deerskin Catawba map (c. 1724) displaying tribes between Charleston (left) and Virginia (right), after displacements induced by enslavement and the Yamasee War. The Cheraw are labeled as "Charra", (Note: Scholars Karen Booker, Robert L. Rankin, and Charles M. Hudson suggested the Charra on the deerskin Catawba map represented the same name as the Chara settlement encountered by Juan Pardo in 1567.) circled in red.

On April 1715, Cheraw warriors joined other Southeastern tribes in the Yamasee War to fight against European enslavement of Indians, mistreatment, and encroachment on their territory. In July, Governor Charles Craven marched north with his militia to attack the Cheraw on the upper Pee Dee River, but had to divert his forces west to pursue war parties. (Note: Later war parties closer to Charles Town may have included the Cheraw.)

==== Negotiations with Virginia ====
On July 18, 1715, a Cheraw delegation negotiated on behalf of other tribes for the resumption of arms exports from the Colony of Virginia. Alexander Spotswood told the Saraw (Cheraw) King he required the Catawba to send some of their children to be educated at Fort Christanna in exchange for relations with them, but the Saraw King lacked authority to authorize this. The Cheraw were out of the war by October 1715.

In 1716, the Cheraw went to Virginia to sign a treaty, instead of signing one with South Carolina. The government of Virginia continued to sell arms to the Cheraw, even though the tribe had not signed a peace deal with South Carolina. (Note: South Carolina accused Virginia of arming the Cheraw the same year, to which the Virginia Council responded that South Carolina had assented to the Virginia-Cheraw treaty.)

==== Continued hostilities ====
The Waxhaw and Cheraw were still attacking colonial settlements in 1716. After the Catawba signed a 1716 treaty with South Carolina, they raided both tribes, who had still not signed treaties with the province. The Waxhaw fled, joining the Cheraw settlements on the Pee Dee River. Scholar Mary Elizabeth Fitts writes the Waxhaw cease to exist as a political entity after this. The Winyaw trading factory was set up 80 miles south of the Cheraw in 1716, but moved south due to threats from the tribe. They continued to harass it afterwards. Skirmishes between South Carolina and the Cheraw, Waccamaw, and Santee continued for three more years.

=== Postwar (1717–1737) ===
A member of the Pedee spoke with colonial officials on behalf of the Cheraw in 1717. The Waccamaw moved to the Pee Dee River to join the Cheraw in 1718, but were recognized as a separate group until decades later. The Keyauwee had also joined the Cheraw by the 1720s. In the aftermath of their treaty with Virginia, Virginians began visiting the Pee Dee River to trade with the Cheraw. The Cheraw and Waccamaw were attacking local settlers in the same year. When this was brought up to a Catawba chief, he said he did not have relations with either tribe. Neither tribe had joined the Catawba at this point.

When the Council of Virginia offered various tribes protection in 1732, the Cheraw were asked to join the Saponi near Fort Christanna. They remained on the Pee Dee instead, and the Saponi were adopted by the Cayuga. The Cheraw sold most of their Pee Dee River lands to the trader John Thompson in 1737.

=== Settlement among the Catawba (1737–1761) ===
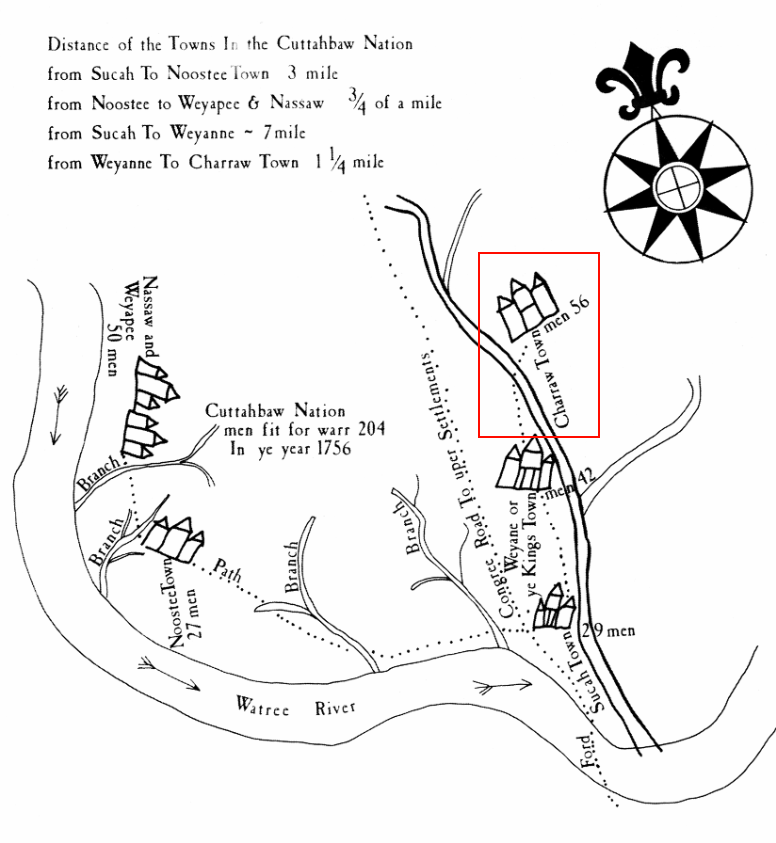
Charraw Town labelled within the Catawba settlement, 1756. The branch the Cheraw settlement is on is identified as either Sugar Creek, or a spring creek emerging from the south of Fort Mill. The creek is labelled "spring branch" on the Catawba Plat Book.

The Cheraw relocated to the lower Catawba River valley, and formed Charraw Town (Note: The Charraw Town archaeological site is referred to as 38Yk17.) among the Catawba in the 1730s, likely in 1737 after selling their land to Thompson. In 1738, a smallpox epidemic decimated both the Cheraw and the Catawba. Governor James Glen informed Catawba chief King Haigler that the South Carolina colony had played a role in persuading the Cheraw, Waccamaw, and Pedee to join the Catawba. Anthropologist John Adair wrote that Cheraw was still spoken in the settlement in 1743.

The Cheraw maintained a distinct community within the Catawba settlement, and the Catawba language gradually transitioned into two dialects after their joining. Mary Fitts writes that the two dialects of Catawba, Esaw and Saraw, likely originated as distinct languages, following the reasoning of Ives Goddard. She writes that this strengthens the interpretation of the Dan River Sara, ancestors of the Cheraw, being Siouan-Catawban speakers from the northern piedmont.

==== Material culture ====
Charraw Town was surrounded by a circular palisade. Citizens ate corn supplied to them by Nasaw Town. Under a specialized labor system, women in Nasaw town shelled and processed corn before sending it to Charraw Town for consumption. Beans, nuts, fruit, and brambles are relatively more common in Charraw Town archaeological samples. Nuts were most heavily harvested in Charraw Town compared to other Catawba settlements.

Potsherds found in Charraw Town were not net-impressed, unlike those from 17th century Cheraw pottery. Pottery in Charraw Town used less stamped impressions than pottery in the twin towns of Nasaw and Weyapee. Bauer writes the pottery traditions of the diverse groups within the Catawba merged over time, becoming linked to Catawba identity and nationhood.

==== Mergers and epidemic ====
A 1756 map made by John Evans depicts 56 soldiers residing in Charraw Town, making it the largest of the Catawba settlements. The Waccamaw and Pedee are no longer recorded as separate elements within the Cheraw settlement at this point. Glass bead use decreased heavily after the abandonment of Charraw Town.

In 1759, a group of Cheraw soldiers, led by King Johnny, attacked Fort Du Quesne. The soldiers brought smallpox back upon their return, and the settlements were abandoned in the resulting epidemic. The tribes returned to the area in 1761.

=== Within the Catawba (1761–1800) ===
Scholar Charles L. Heath suggests that Catawba militarism provided groups such as the Cheraw with a shared heritage drawing from heroes and stories rooted in conflict, increasing group solidarity.

John Evans Jr. (son of John Evans) and Spanau Bullen (Note: Spanau's English name was recorded as James/Jemey Bullen.) were prominent Catawba warriors, with Cheraw mothers and white fathers. Spanau was opposed to the leadership of King Hagler in the 1750s. He later fought alongside George Washington in the French and Indian War, who he had befriended. He received a commission from Arthur Dobbs and died in 1758.

==== Old Town (1781–1800) ====
The families in the Catawba settlement retreated to the north in 1780, during the American Revolutionary War. Upon their return in 1781, their settlements had been destroyed. They rebuilt them in two divisions across the Catawba River. These were Old Town and Ayers Town, respectively on the east and west banks of the river. Bauer and Fitts suggest Old Town and Ayers Town reflected the remaining divisions within the Catawba, with Old Town representing the Cheraw faction. Old Town lasted until 1800, after which New Town (1790–1820) was populated.

== Descendants ==
Location of the Catawba Reservation, in York County, South Carolina.

The Cheraw were adopted into the multi-ethnic Catawba Confederacy, and the modern Catawba descend from the merger of the Esaw and Cheraw. Scholar Ives Goddard wrote the Saraw and Esaw dialects of Catawba presumably descend from the Pee Dee River Cheraw and the Catawba River Esaw.

The Catawba Indian Nation is a federally recognized tribe in South Carolina.

=== Claimed descent ===
Historian Karen Blu states that John Reed Swanton looked at documentation of the Cheraw being in the general area of the "Croatoan Indian" community previously, and assumed they would be ancestral to them as a result, but that this is speculative and there remain no firm links between them and the Cheraw. One other federally recognized tribe, the Lumbee Tribe of North Carolina in Robeson County, North Carolina, and the state-recognized Sumter Tribe of Cheraw Indians in Sumter County, South Carolina, through connections to the Lumbee, claim descent from the historic Cheraw people. However, these claims are considered by most academics to be unsubstantiated.

== Namesakes ==
Namesakes of the historic Cheraw people include:

- Cheraw and Darlington Railroad
- Cheraw, Colorado, named by an early settler who was born in Cheraw, South Carolina, and migrated west.
- Cheraw High School
- Cheraw Historic District
- Cheraw, Mississippi
- Cheraw Municipal Airport
- Cheraw, South Carolina
- Cheraw State Park
- Sauratown Mountains, located in a region where the Cheraw people lived, the mountain range is named after a variant of their name.

Located in Walnut Cove, North Carolina, South Stokes High School's team mascot has been named after the Cheraw people since 1964.

== See also ==
- Catawba in the American Civil War
- Catawba Trail
- Cherokee Path
- Eastern Band of Cherokee Indians
- Fort San Juan (Joara)
- Indigenous peoples of the Southeastern Woodlands
- List of sites and peoples visited by the Hernando de Soto Expedition
- Mississippian period (archaeology)
- Muscogee
- Meherrin
- Occaneechi
- Trading Path
- Tuscarora people
- Yuchi
- Woccon language

== Bibliography ==
- Beck, Robin. Chiefdoms, Collapse, and Coalescence in the Early American South, Cambridge University Press, 2013, p. 170
- Rudes, Blair A., Thomas J. Blumer, and J. Alan May. "Catawba and Neighboring Groups." In Handbook of North American Indians: Volume 14, Southeast. Washington, DC: Smithsonian Institution, 2004. ISBN 0-16-072300-0.
- Blu, Karen I. "Lumbee." In Handbook of North American Indians: Volume 14, Southeast. Washington, DC: Smithsonian Institution, 2004. ISBN 0-16-072300-0.
- Demallie, Raymond J. "Tutelo and Neighboring Groups." In Handbook of North American Indians: Volume 14, Southeast. Washington, DC: Smithsonian Institution, 2004. ISBN 0-16-072300-0.
- Gallay, Alan (2002). The Indian Slave Trade: The Rise of the English Empire in the American South 1670-1717. New Haven, CT: Yale University Press. ISBN 0-300-10193-7.
- Fitts, Mary Elizabeth (2017). Fit for War: Sustenance and Order in the Mid-Eighteenth-Century Catawba Nation. Gainesville, FL: University of Florida Press. ISBN 9781683400059. LCCN 2017001732.
- Ward, H. Trawick; Davis, R. P. Stephen Jr. (1993). Indian Communities on the North Carolina Piedmont, A.D. 1000 to 1700 (PDF). Chapel Hill, NC: University of North Carolina at Chapel Hill. ISBN 0-944913-01-6 – via Carolina Digital Repository.
- Eastman, Jane M. (1999). The Sara and Dan River Peoples: Siouan Communities in North Carolina’s Interior Piedmont From A.D. 1000 to A.D. 1700 (PDF) (PhD thesis). Chapel Hill, NC: University of North Carolina at Chapel Hill.
- Fitts, Mary Elizabeth (2015). "The Indian Slave Trade and Catawba History". In Marshall, Lydia Wilson (ed.). The Archaeology of Slavery: A Comparative Approach to Captivity and Coercion. Carbondale, IL: Southern Illinois University Press. ISBN 978-0-8093-3398-1. LCCN 2014943183.
- Heath, Charles L. (2004). Davis, R. P. Stephen Jr. (ed.). "Catawba Militarism: Ethnohistorial and Archaeological Overviews" (PDF). North Carolina Archaeology. 53. Chapel Hill, NC: University of North Carolina and The North Carolina Archaeological Society Inc.: 80–120.
- Ivers, Larry E. (2016). This Torrent of Indians: War on the Southern Frontier 1715–1728. Columbia, SC: The University of South Carolina Press. ISBN 978-1-61117-607-0.
- Bauer, Brooke M. (2023). Frank, Andrew K.; Hudson, Angela Pulley; Ray, Kristofer (eds.). Becoming Catawba: Catawba Indian Women and Nation-Building, 1540–1840. Indians and Southern History. Tuscaloosa, AL: The University of Alabama Press. ISBN 978-0- 8173- 9427- 1. OCLC 1350429789.
- Fitts, Mary Elizabeth (2006). "Mapping Catawba Coalescence" (PDF). North Carolina Archaeology. 55. Chapel Hill, NC: University of North Carolina and The North Carolina Archaeological Society Inc.
- Rudes, Blair A. (2004). "Place Names of Cofitachequi". Anthropological Linguistics. 46 (4). Bloomington, IN: Trustees of Indiana University: 359–426.
- Ethridge, Robbie; Shuck-Hall, Sherri M., eds. (2009). Mapping the Mississippian Shatter Zone: The Colonial Indian Slave Trade and Regional Instability in the American South. Lincoln, NE: University of Nebraska Press. ISBN 978-0-8032-1759-1.
- Parent, Anthony S. Jr. (2025). Flocks of Birds: Virginia Colonialism into Native Country, 1670–1776. Columbia, SC: University of South Carolina Press. ISBN 978-1-64336-575-6. LCCN 2025003004.
- Rudes, Blair A. (2004). "Multilingualism in the South". In Bender, Margaret Clelland (ed.). Linguistic Diversity in the South: Changing Codes, Practices, and Ideology, Volume 37. Athens, GA: University of Georgia Press. ISBN 9780820325859.
- Davis, R. P. Stephen, Jr.; Riggs, Brett H.; Cranford., David (2015). Archaeology at Ayers Town: An Early Federal Period Community in the Catawba Nation (Report) (Redacted ed.). Chapel Hill, NC: The University of North Carolina.
