= Joara =

Archaeological site in North Carolina, United States of America

- Town, Chiefdom capital
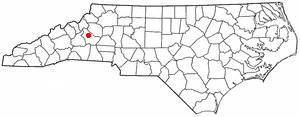
- Coordinates: 35°49′27″N 81°44′01″W
- Settled by Mississippian-era Native Americans: c. 1000
- Replaced by Spanish Fort San Juan; fort destroyed: 1567; 1568

Joara was a large Native American settlement, a regional chiefdom of the Mississippian culture, located in what is now Burke County, North Carolina, about 300 miles from the Atlantic coast in the foothills of the Blue Ridge Mountains. Joara is notable as a significant archaeological and historic site, where Mississippian culture-era and European artifacts have been found, in addition to an earthwork platform mound and remains of a 16th-century Spanish fort.

The first European encounters came in the mid-16th century. In 1540 the party of Spanish conquistador Hernando De Soto recorded visiting this place. A later expedition in 1567 under Juan Pardo, another Spanish explorer, founded the first European settlement in the interior of the continent, establishing Fort San Juan at this site, followed by other forts to the west. It is thought to be the first and the largest of the six forts that Pardo established in his attempt to establish an overland road to the silver mines of Mexico. At the time, the Spanish mistakenly believed that the Appalachian Mountains were the same as a range running through central Mexico. After about eighteen months, all but one of the Spanish troops at the six forts were killed by the indigenous people of the area. Pardo had already left and survived to return to Spain. The Spanish made no other attempts at settlement in this interior. British-related colonization did not begin here until the mid-to late 18th century.

In the late 20th century, a Spanish account of the Pardo expedition was rediscovered and newly translated in English. Based on it, excavations were undertaken in this area of Burke County beginning in the 1990s. After discovery of both European and Mississippian artifacts at this site in 2008, on July 22, 2013, archeologists announced having found evidence of the remains of Fort San Juan at Joara, including a moat that cut through an earthwork mound built by the Mississippians.

== History ==
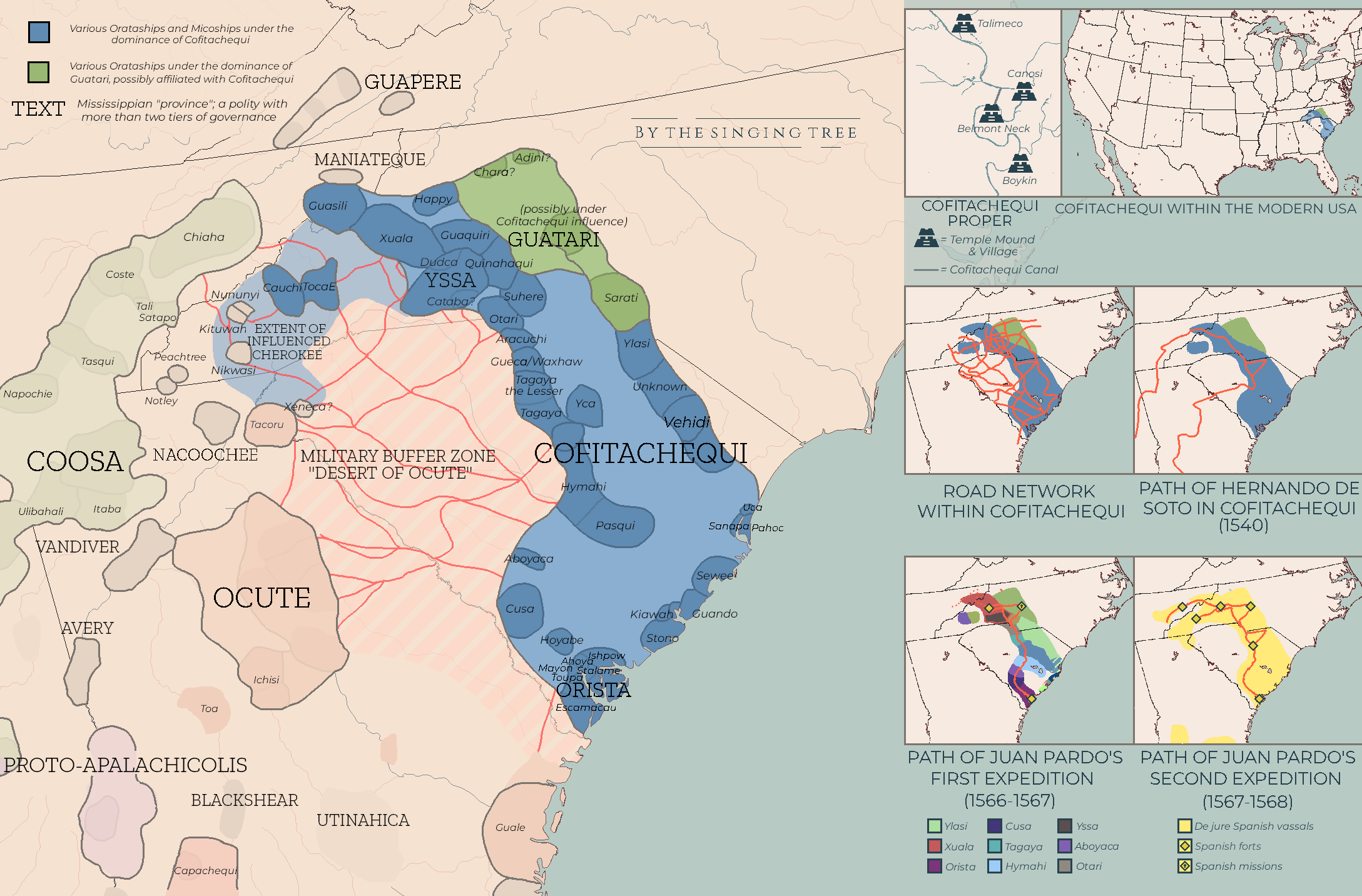
Joara (Xuala), and nearby polities.

In the 21st century, archaeological finds from excavations have established evidence of substantial Mississippian and brief Spanish 16th-century settlement in the western interior of North Carolina. The Joara chiefdom was the site of Fort San Juan, established by the Juan Pardo expedition as the earliest Spanish outpost (1567–1568) in the interior of what is now North Carolina. This was 40 years before the English settlement at Jamestown and nearly 20 years before their "Lost Colony" at Roanoke Island.

Located northwest of present-day Morganton, seat of Burke County, the site has been excavated since the early 2000s, in portions, by the Upper Catawba Valley Archaeology Project. Regular open houses and educational events are held for the public during the summer excavation season.

Established about AD 1000, Joara was the largest Mississippian-culture settlement within the current boundaries of North Carolina. In 1540 a party of Spanish conquistador Hernando De Soto recorded encountering the people at this chiefdom site. De Soto's 1540 expedition also noted the Chalaque people in the area near Joara. Chalaque is believed by scholars to refer to the Cherokee. The Cherokee, an Iroquoian-speaking people, are believed to have migrated into their homelands of present-day western North Carolina, South Carolina, southeastern Tennessee, and northeastern Georgia from northern areas around the Great Lakes. According to de Soto's account, Cherokee speakers were among the peoples present during the late Mississippian-culture era.

Joara was still thriving in January 1567 when Spanish soldiers under command of Captain Juan Pardo arrived. Pardo established a base there for the winter, called the settlement Cuenca, and built Fort San Juan. Pardo's men also traveled west, establishing five more forts, including one at Chiaha. After 18 months, the natives killed the soldiers at Fort San Juan and burned the structures down. That same year, 1568, the natives destroyed the other five forts in the southwest interior of the region and killed all but one of the 120 men Pardo had stationed in them. As a result, the Spanish ended their colonizing effort in the interior of the Southeast.

High mortality due to European infectious diseases and warfare reduced the smaller bands of peoples. The historic tribes arose in new political groupings. Joara was abandoned long before English explorers arrived in the region in the 17th century, and the site became lost. English, Scots-Irish and German immigrants arrived in northwestern North Carolina in the later 18th century.

== Settlement ==
Joara is thought to have been settled some time after AD 1000 by people of the Mississippian culture era, who built an earthwork mound at the site. It was developed on the west bank of Upper Creek and within sight of Table Rock, a dominant geographical feature of the area. The Joara natives comprised the eastern extent of Mississippian culture, which was centered in the Mississippi and Ohio river valleys. By the time of the first European contact by the Spanish with Native Americans in the foothills of the southern Appalachians, Joara had already grown to be the largest Mississippian-culture settlement in present-day North Carolina. The town served as the political center of a regional chiefdom that controlled many of the surrounding native settlements.

Most contemporary scholars, following John Swanton, connect the various spellings of Joara with the Cheraw, a Siouan language-speaking people who later inhabited this region.

Cofitachequi, in southeast South Carolina, and the competitor Coosa chiefdoms in present-day northwest Georgia were developed by ancestral Muskogean-speaking groups, who apparently claimed other areas as tributary. The Muscogee, or Creek people, are their descendants.

The scholar T.H. Lewis at first associated the term Xualla with the modern Qualla Boundary and thought it was Cherokee. Most modern scholars no longer believe this because historically, the French Broad River is thought to be the eastern boundary for the Cherokee in North Carolina. But anthropologist Charles M. Hudson alone argues that Joara may be a Cherokee name. Excavations have shown that the site was not Cherokee.

== Spanish exploration ==
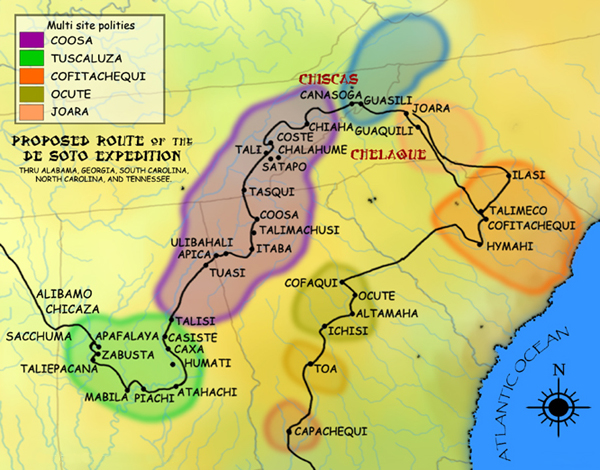
A map showing the de Soto expedition route thru Georgia, South Carolina, North Carolina, Tennessee, and Alabama. Based on Charles M. Hudson's map of 1997

=== Hernando de Soto ===
In 1540, Hernando de Soto led a Spanish army up the eastern edge of the Appalachian mountains through present-day Georgia, South Carolina and North Carolina, before turning southwest. This expedition recorded the first European contact with the people of Joara, which de Soto's chroniclers called Xuala. De Soto brought the queen of Cofitachequi province to Joara as an involuntary member of his entourage. The chroniclers also state that the queen claimed political dominion at this time over Joara province as well as the province of Chalaque, believed to refer to the Cherokee. The natives in both places respected her office. She managed to escape from the Spanish after reaching Joara.

The Spanish departed to continue their exploration, crossing westward over the Blue Ridge into present-day eastern Tennessee. They recorded visiting the Coosa chiefdom at Guasile. The Muskogee Creek people are considered descendants of the Coosa.

=== Captain Juan Pardo's first expedition ===
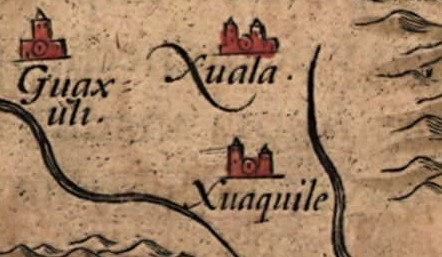
Detail of Joara (spelled Xuala) and neighboring villages on Chiaves's 1584 map of La Florida

On December 1, 1566, Spanish Captain Juan Pardo and 125 men departed from Santa Elena, a center of Spanish Florida (located on present-day Parris Island, Beaufort County, South Carolina) under orders from Governor Pedro Menéndez de Avilés to claim the interior for Spain. Pardo was to pacify the native inhabitants, convert them to Catholicism, and establish a route to Spanish silver mines near Zacatecas, Mexico. The Spanish thought Santa Elena was much closer to the mines than it actually was, and confused the Appalachian Mountains with a range in central Mexico.

To stay close to food sources on their journey through the foothills, the Spanish traveled northwest from the coast where there were friendly natives who would help to feed them. The small Spanish force stopped at Otari (near present-day Charlotte, Mecklenburg County, North Carolina) and Yssa (near present-day Denver, Lincoln County), before arriving at Joara (in present-day Burke County).

==== Fort San Juan ====
Captain Pardo and his men reached Joara in January 1567. He renamed it Cuenca after his hometown of Cuenca, Spain. Snow in the Appalachian Mountains forced the Spanish to establish a winter base in the foothills at Joara. According to the records of the expedition, the explorers built a wooden fort at the north end of Joara and named it Fort San Juan. The fort became the first European settlement of present-day North Carolina, predating the first English colonies of Roanoke Island by 18 years and Jamestown, Virginia by 40 years.

The Spanish kept a base in Fort San Juan and claimed sovereignty over several other settlements in the region, including Guaquiri (near present-day Hickory, Catawba County, North Carolina) and Quinahaqui (also in present-day Catawba County, NC). In February 1567, Captain Pardo established Fort Santiago at Guatari, a smaller town of Guatari (also called Wateree) natives located in present-day Rowan County, North Carolina.

When Captain Pardo received word of a possible French invasion of Santa Elena (an early Spanish mission on the coast), he left a garrison of 30 soldiers to occupy Joara, and four soldiers and his chaplain, Sebastián Montero, to occupy Guatari. He departed the area with the remainder of his force. Pardo appointed sergeant Hernando Moyano to command the force stationed at Fort San Juan.

=== Hernando Moyano's raids ===
During the spring of 1567, Hernando Moyano led a combined force of natives and Spanish north. The force attacked and burned the Chisca tribe's village of Maniateque (near present-day Saltville, Virginia) before returning to Joara. After resting and supplying his force, Moyano led the men to Guapere (thought to be on the upper Watauga River in present-day Tennessee). The Spanish and native force attacked and burned Guapere and marched west to Chiaha (located on the Lower French Broad River, also in present-day Tennessee). Moyano's force built a fort in Chiaha and waited for Captain Pardo to return.

=== Captain Juan Pardo's second expedition ===
Captain Juan Pardo returned to Fort San Juan in September 1567 to find the local inhabitants angered by the Spanish raids, and their demands for food, women, and canoes. The deaths from newly introduced infectious diseases, endemic among the Spanish and other Europeans, was destabilizing the indigenous community, causing resentment toward the Europeans. Instead of continuing his mission to Mexico, Captain Pardo left a garrison at Fort San Juan and marched the remainder of his troops westward to resupply Moyano's troops.

Pardo first took his troops to the native village of Tocae (near present-day Asheville, North Carolina), then continued to Cauchi (Mississippian town) (near present-day Canton. The force continued on to Tanasqui and then to Chiaha, where they found Moyano's troops in need of supply. After aiding them, Pardo returned to Santa Elena.

=== Native uprising and end of Spanish colonization ===
Shortly after May 1568, news reached Santa Elena that the native population had burned the six Spanish forts established by Juan Pardo and killed all but one of the 120 Spanish men stationed in those garrisons. Pardo never returned to the area, and Spain ended all attempts to conquer and colonize the southeastern interior.

Captain Pardo's narrative of his travels, settlement at Joara and founding of five other forts, written by his scribe Bandera, were discovered in the 1980s and translated into English for the first time. Together with the archeological evidence at Joara, they have contributed to a significant reassessment of the history of Spanish colonization in the interior of North America.

== Abandonment ==
At the time of the first Spanish contact, the native people of the area were identified by their villages of residence; they were part of regional cultures, in archeological terms. Mortality from European diseases and conquest and assimilation by large tribes, such as the Catawba and Cherokee, caused many of these smaller native bands to disappear as distinct groups.

In 1670, English explorer John Lederer, departing from Fort Henry, explored deep into North Carolina. He described a large town he called "Sara", in the mountains that "received from the Spaniards the name of Suala". He said that the natives here mined cinnabar to make purple facepaint, and had cakes of salt. James Needham and Gabriel Archer also explored the entire area from Fort Henry in 1671, and described this town as "Sarrah". Scholars believe they were referring to a village likely several miles to the east of the original Joara.

By the time most English, Moravian, Scots-Irish, and German settlers arrived in the area in the mid to late-18th century, Joara and many of the other ancient native towns in the region had been abandoned. The sites became overgrown and remains of structures and mounds were hidden. But further west in North Carolina and across the mountains in Tennessee, the Cherokee had continued to occupy many Mississippian culture towns, such as Nikwasi, Too-Cowee, Kituwa, and Chota.

Although the sites of Joara and Fort San Juan were forgotten, local inhabitants found numerous native artifacts in certain areas of the upper Catawba River Valley. Unlike areas in which earthwork mounds were recognized and protected, during the early 1950s farmers bulldozed Joara's twelve-foot-high earthen platform mound to make way for cultivation. The location of the mound is now recognizable only as a two-foot rise in the field, but current owners vow to protect the site.

== Rediscovery at the Berry site ==
During the 1960s and 1970s, several archaeological surveys were conducted in Burke County to determine possible locations of Joara and Fort San Juan. By the 1980s, archaeologists had reduced the number of possible locations and began limited excavations. These surveys and excavations showed that the upper Catawba River Valley did have a sizable native population during the 14th to 16th centuries.

In 1986, a breakthrough occurred at the Berry excavation site (named for the family who own the property). Archaeologists discovered 16th-century Spanish artifacts. This evidence, supported by Bandera's recently rediscovered 16th-century narrative, caused a reevaluation of Pardo's route through the Upper Catawba Valley. The evidence suggested that the Berry Site is the location of Joara and Fort San Juan. The archaeological site has demonstrated the extent to which the Spanish attempted to establish a colonial foothold in the interior of the Southeast. The evidence of the five Spanish forts further west, near other towns, have not yet been discovered.

Further excavations at the Berry site throughout the 1990s and 2000s yielded remains of native Joara settlement and burned Spanish huts, and more 16th-century Spanish artifacts. These included olive jar fragments, a spike, and a knife. In 2007, the team excavated Structure 5 and found a Spanish iron scale, as well as evidence of Spanish building techniques. These artifacts were not trade goods but objects used by the Spanish themselves in settlements. Joara is particularly interesting for revealing the interaction between Native Americans and Spanish, who were relatively few in number and depended on the natives for food.

In 2009 archaeologists familiar with the area concluded this is definitely the site of Joara and Fort San Juan. Evidence supports documented Spanish settlement of 1567–1568, as well as the natives' burning of the fort. The materials found have required a reassessment of the history of European contact with Native Americans. In July 2013, archeologists reported finding evidence of the remains of the fort itself at the site, including the remnants of burned palisades and what appeared to be the main structure within the fort.

== Curiosities ==
There is a small town in the north of Spain called Joara (Spanish Wikipedia).

== See also ==
- Cheraw
- List of sites and peoples visited by the Hernando de Soto Expedition
- Southeastern Ceremonial Complex
- List of Mississippian sites
- Bussell Island
