= Spanish missions in the Carolinas =

Catholic religious outposts

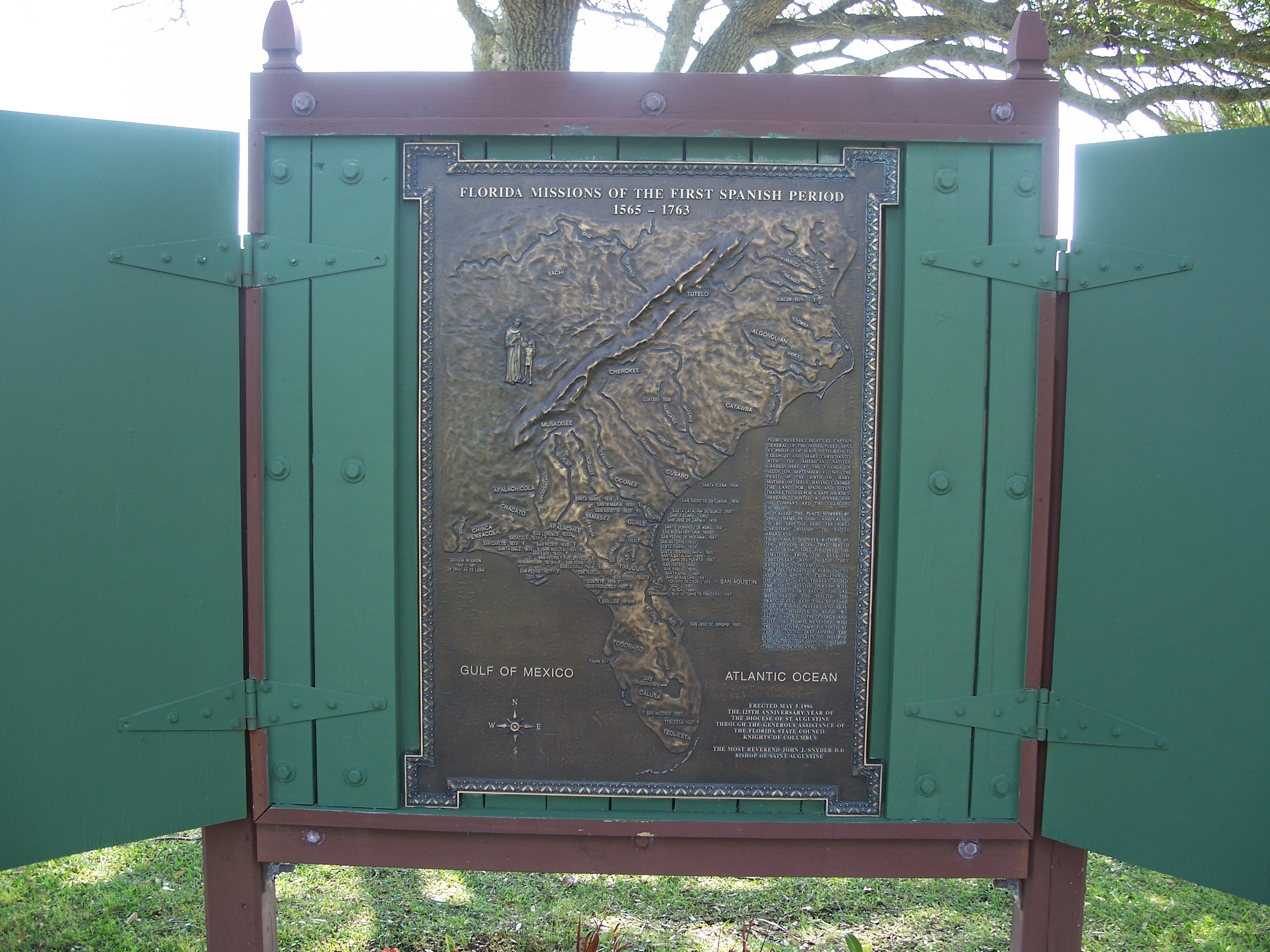
A plaque showing the locations of a third of the missions between 1565 and 1763

The Spanish missions in the Carolinas were short-lived Catholic missions and mission-related outposts connected to Spain's province of La Florida in what is now the Carolinas, especially present-day South Carolina. They were closely associated with the Spanish settlement and presidio of Santa Elena on Parris Island in present-day South Carolina. Although Spanish Florida is often associated with present-day Florida, Spain's colonial province of La Florida extended northward into the Carolinas at its greatest extent.

Spanish activity in the Carolinas combined religious, political, and military goals. Missionaries attempted to spread Catholicism among local Native peoples, while Spanish officials used missions, forts, and alliances to support control over the northern frontier of La Florida. Mission-related locations associated with Spanish activity in the Carolinas included Escamacu-Orista, Guatari, and Joada, also listed as Joadi.

== Background and purpose ==
Spanish missions in the Carolinas formed part of the wider colonial system of La Florida. The missions served religious, political, and cultural purposes. Their religious purpose was to convert Native peoples to Christianity and spread Catholicism in the Americas. At the same time, missions helped Spain pacify frontier areas for settlement and spread Spanish religious and cultural influence among Indigenous peoples. Depending on their location and period, Spanish missions could also serve social, economic, and defensive functions, including teaching, farming, housing, trade, or military support.

The mission-related efforts in the Carolinas were closely tied to Santa Elena. Because Santa Elena was Spain’s main settlement in the region, these efforts were connected to Spanish activity on the northern frontier of La Florida.

== Santa Elena ==
Santa Elena was the main Spanish settlement connected to mission activity in the Carolinas. Located on present-day Parris Island, South Carolina, it was founded in 1566 by Pedro Menéndez de Avilés and became the sixteenth-century capital of Spanish Florida. Spanish forts associated with Santa Elena included Fort San Salvador, Fort San Felipe, and Fort San Marcos.

From Santa Elena, the Spanish expanded inland, attempting to pacify Native Americans through trade, violence, and conversion to Catholicism. Spanish efforts at settlement and conversion faced Indigenous resistance. In 1576, Native Americans from the vicinity of Orista and Escamacu burned Santa Elena, but the Spanish later rebuilt it. In 1587, the Spanish left Santa Elena and shifted their focus to St. Augustine, Florida.

== Missions and related outposts ==
Spanish mission-related sites associated with Santa Elena included Escamacu-Orista, Guatari, and Joada, also listed as Joadi. These places were associated with Spanish activity around Santa Elena and with Spanish expansion into the northern frontier of La Florida. Some were connected to missionary activity, while others were inland blockhouses or garrisons where priests were present.

=== Escamacu-Orista ===
Escamacu and Orista were two distinct but closely located villages on an island upriver from Santa Elena. Orista was the name of a head chief in the Santa Elena region, and Pedro Menéndez de Avilés visited the village in 1566. Later, the Spanish built a blockhouse or fort in Orista. Escamacu was the village where Father Rogel lived and worked, although his mission work there was unsuccessful.

=== Guatari ===
Guatari was located in the Carolina hinterland, probably near the Wateree River. In 1566, Juan Pardo left four soldiers and a priest at Guatari before returning to Santa Elena. In 1567, Pardo expanded the garrison at Guatari. However, by 1568, Father Rogel reported that the garrisons at Guatari and several other hinterland blockhouses had been eliminated by Native peoples.

=== Joada / Joadi ===
Joada, also listed as Joadi, was located deeper in the Carolina hinterland than Guatari and has been identified with Hernando de Soto’s Xuala. Joada was the site of a blockhouse called Fort Juan. In 1566, the village had a fifteen-soldier garrison under Hernando de Moyano; by 1567, this garrison had grown to thirty-one soldiers.

== Missionaries ==
As part of the wider La Florida mission system, missionary work was first attempted by Jesuit priests and was later continued mainly by Franciscans. After Pedro Menéndez de Avilés arrived in St. Augustine, he requested that Spain send Jesuit priests to Florida to begin missionary work among the Indigenous population. The Spanish government, missionaries, and Indigenous leaders often had different objectives. The Spanish government hoped that peaceful Christian converts could provide food, labor, and security for Spanish colonists; missionaries sought to convert Native peoples to Christianity; and some Indigenous leaders accepted missionaries or Spanish alliances because gifts and trade goods could strengthen their own authority.

The Jesuits began missionary work in La Florida in 1566, but their efforts were short-lived. Some Jesuits were killed by Native Floridians, and the order left Florida in 1572. Franciscan missionaries arrived a year after the Jesuits departed. Beginning in 1595, Franciscan efforts intensified, and more Franciscans arrived in Florida.

== Decline and abandonment ==
Mission-related efforts in the Carolinas ended earlier than the wider Spanish mission system in La Florida. The main turning point was the Spanish withdrawal from Santa Elena in 1587, after which Spain shifted its focus to St. Augustine. Because Carolina mission activity was closely tied to Santa Elena, the abandonment of the settlement marked the end of Spain’s main base for such activity in the region.

The wider Spanish mission system in La Florida continued into the seventeenth and early eighteenth centuries. It declined because of disease, forced labor, and attacks from English colonists and their Native allies. Disease caused major Native population decline, while forced labor under repartimiento weakened Native communities. In the early 1700s, English raiders from Carolina and Native allies such as the Yamasee and Westo attacked Spanish missions, captured Native people, and sold captives into slavery in Carolina and the Caribbean.

By 1704, many missions in the wider La Florida system had been destroyed or abandoned, and many mission Native Americans had fled or been captured and sold into slavery.

== See also ==
- Sebastián Montero

== Sources ==
- Hann, John H. (April 1990). "Summary Guide to Spanish Florida Missions and Visitas. With Churches in the Sixteenth and Seventeenth Centuries". The Americas. 46 (4): 417–513. doi:10.2307/1006866. JSTOR 1006866. S2CID 147329347.
