= Congaree people =

Historic Native American tribe in South Carolina

Congaree
Total population
- Extinct; 40 (1715)

Regions with significant populations
- On Congaree River near present-day Columbia, South Carolina. Later on Waccamaw River in Horry County, South Carolina

Languages
- Unclassified; Possibly Siouan-Catawban

Religion
- Native American religion

Related ethnic groups
- Catawba, Keyauwee, Santee, Wateree

The Congaree were a historic Indigenous people of the Southeastern Woodlands who once lived within what is now central South Carolina, along the Congaree and Santee rivers, above and below the confluence of the Wateree River. The Congaree joined the Catawba people in company of the Wateree several years after temporarily migrating to the Waccamaw River in 1732. They spoke a language distinct from and unintelligible to local Siouan-Catawban languages. The language today is unclassified, though, some academics in the late 19th and early 20th centuries believe that the language was related to Catawba.

== Language ==
Congaree
- Native to: United States
- Region: South Carolina
- Ethnicity: Congaree
- Extinct: 18th century
- Language family: unclassified (Siouan-Catawban?)

Language codes
- ISO 639-3: None (mis)
- Linguist List: 071
- Glottolog: None

English explorer John Lawson noted in 1709 that members of the Congaree tribe were distinguishable from other nearby tribes by their appearance, customs, and language. During the middle of the 18th century, Congaree was one of the languages spoken on the Catawba Reservation.

During the late 19th and early 20th centuries, American scholars thought the Congaree were likely part of the Siouan-Catawban language family, given their geographic location and characteristics of neighboring tribes like the Catawba. Since the late 20th century, scholars have suggested that the Congaree people did not speak a Siouan language due to their language not being intelligible to their immediate Siouan-speaking neighbors. Linguist Blair A. Rudes suggested that the name "Congaree" is possibly a rendering of kųkari• Catawban for 'over there, out of sight'. He noted that if this is the case, the name is an exonym and not the name members of the tribe would have called themselves.

Only one word of the Congaree language is known, being Cassetta 'king (chief)'.

== History ==
=== 17th century ===
In Native American practice, people taken as captives in warfare, particularly women and children, were often enslaved. European colonists encouraged the tribes to take and sell Indian captives into their domestic slave trade. By 1693, the Congaree, Esaw, and Savannah slave-catchers had pursued the Cherokee as "objects of the slave trade to the extent that a tribal delegation was sent" to Governor Thomas Smith. They sought protection, claiming that Cherokee had been sold in the Charles Town slave market.

In 1698, the Congaree lost "most tribe members to smallpox." The Native Americans suffered high mortality from new infectious diseases that had become endemic for centuries among Europeans, leading to some acquired immunity for the latter.

=== 18th century ===
The English explorer John Lawson encountered the survivors in 1701, apparently on the northeastern bank of the Santee River below the junction of the Wateree. Lawson described their village as consisting of about a dozen houses, located on a small creek flowing into the Santee River. He described them as a small tribe that lost population due to tribal feuds and raids, but especially by smallpox which had depopulated whole villages. A 1715 map shows their village as located on the southern bank of the Congaree and considerably above the previous area, perhaps near Big Beaver Creek, or about opposite the future site of Columbia, on the eastern boundary of Lexington County. They may have been moving upriver to get further from English colonists.

At that time, Keyauwee Jack, a Congaree by birth, had become chief of the Keyauwee by marriage.

During the Tuscarora War of 1711, the Congaree fought on the side of English colonist John Barnwell, who raised a militia. In early 1715, John Barnwell took a census that identified the Congaree as living in one village, with a total population of 22 men and 70 women and children.

During the Yamasee War of 1715–17, the Congaree joined with other tribes in the fight against the colony of South Carolina. Over half were either killed or enslaved by the colonists and Cherokee; some were sent into slavery in the West Indies. Following that, surviving Congaree moved upriver and joined the Catawba, with whom they were still living in 1743.

In 1718, Fort Congaree was established near the Congaree village, near today's Columbia. It became an important trading station and a European-American settlement formed around it.

In the subsequent decades, Congaree survivors merged with the larger Catawba people. Different tribes lived in their own villages within the loose Catawba federation of peoples. The Congaree maintained their distinction until the late 18th century, as they had a language different from Siouan, but they became extinct as a tribe. Their descendants intermarried with the Catawba and other peoples of the confederation.

Based on colonial accounts, American anthropologist James Mooney (1928) described the historic Congaree as: "A friendly people, handsome and well built, the women being especially beautiful compared with those of other tribes."

== Legacy ==
Some members of the present-day Catawba and other tribes of the Carolinas are likely genetic descendants of the Congaree, among others.

Namesakes of the tribe include:

- Congaree River
- Congaree Creek
- Congaree National Park
- South Congaree, South Carolina
- USS Congaree (IX-84)
