= Waxhaw people =

Historic Native American tribe from North and South Carolina, USA

Waxhaw
Total population
- Extinct as a tribe

Regions with significant populations
- USA (North Carolina, South Carolina)

Religion
- Indigenous religion

The Waxhaw people were a Native American tribe who historically lived in present-day counties of Lancaster, in South Carolina; and Union and Mecklenburg in North Carolina, around the area of present-day Charlotte.

== Name ==
The Waxhaw were also referred to as the Waxhau, Wisacky, Gueça, and possibly Wastana and Weesock. The name has been speculatively explained as a cognate of a Catawba word meaning "crest of hair".

== Culture ==
The Waxhaw were related to other nearby Indigenous peoples of the Southeastern Woodlands, such as the Catawba people and the Sugeree. They were likely culturally influenced by the Mississippian culture.

Some scholars suggest the Waxhaw may have been a band of the Catawba rather than a distinctly separate people, given the similarity in what is known of their language and customs. A distinctive custom which they shared was flattening the forehead of individuals, as did the Choctaw. Flattening of the head gave the Waxhaw a distinctive look, with wide eyes and sloping foreheads. They started the process at birth by binding the infant to a flat board. The wider eyes were said to give the Waxhaw a hunting advantage.

The typical Waxhaw dwellings were similar to those of other peoples of the region. They were covered in bark. Ceremonial buildings, however, were usually thatched with reeds and bullgrass. The people held ceremonial dances, tribal meetings, and other important rites in these council houses.

== History ==
=== 17th century ===
In 1673, Gabriel Arthur stayed with the Tomahittan and claimed that they had members of the "Weesock" tribe living among them as warrior slaves. Historian John R. Swanton has suggested that the "Weesock" were in fact the Waxhaw. Arthur stated "all ye wesocks children they take are brought up with them as ye Ianesaryes are amongst ye Turkes", referencing the Janissaries of the Ottoman Empire.

=== 18th century ===
During the Tuscarora War of 1711, South Carolinian colonist John Barnwell recorded 27 Waxhaw warriors under the command of a Captain Jack as taking part in his expedition to attack the Tuscarora along the Neuse River. Captain Jack's unit was referred to as the Essaw Company and contained Wateree, Sugaree, Catawba, Sutaree, Waxhaw, Congaree, and Sattee warriors, totaling 155 men. It was possibly the only company on the expedition to be commanded by a Native American. Barnwell describes using Captain Jack's company to conduct an enveloping maneuver through a swamp during his attack against the Tuscarora town of Kenta. This company was involved in overtaking Fort Narhontes. Captain Jack's entire company (including the Waxhaw) abandoned John Barnwell's expedition in early February; they took advantage of an event that caused them to spend the night separated from Barnwell by a river. Barnwell claimed that they left to sell the slaves they had captured during the fighting with the Tuscarora.

Historian William Ramsey has speculated that the Waxhaw's involvement in this war antagonized the Tuscarora's Iroquoian allies: the Seneca and Mohawk of New York, and led to the latter two tribes launching raids against the Waxhaw that may have continued to the Yamasee War in 1715. Ramsey cites the failure of the colonists to protect the Waxhaw from hostile attacks as a catalyst for the Waxhaw's decision to join the Yamasee in their war against the South Carolina colony.

During the Yamasee War of 1715 to 1717, the Waxhaw were aligned with the Yamasee Confederation, as were their Catawba neighbors. Rev. Francis Le Jau, in his letters to a missionary organization based in London, recounted an attack launched by the Catawba and their neighbors on 17 May 1715 against the Goose Creek settlement in South Carolina. Though Le Jau did not mention the Waxhaw by name, it is likely they were included in the band he was referring to when he wrote "..that Body of Northern Indians being a mixture of Catabaws, Sarraws, Waterees &c"

The Native Americans first had success at Goose Creek, ambushing and defeating 90 men under the command of Thomas Barker, son-in-law of Col. James Moore. Barker and his men had been led into the ambush by a Native American slave who had been freed by Col. Moore. Barker and 26 of his men were killed. The defeat of Capt. Barker was quickly followed by the Yamasee and Waxhaw besieging a small fort garrisoned by 30 men, both white and black; it quickly fell. In July the Native American warriors were defeated and driven out of Goose Creek by George Chicken. Shortly after this defeat, the Catawba made peace with South Carolina. In the process, they turned on the Waxhaw and most likely destroyed them as a tribe.

Historians debate the time of the tribe's disbanding. Peter Moore and William Ramsey argue that they disbanded immediately following the Yamasee War against English colonists in the 1710s. Moore suggested that the surviving Waxhaw either were adopted into the Cheraw or traveled south with the Yamasee. In Robert Ney McNeely's 1912 history of Union County, he suggested that the Waxhaw continued on as an independent tribe until the 1740s, but primary sources do not corroborate this.
