= Cheraw, Mississippi =

- Unincorporated community
- Location within Mississippi Location within the United States
- Coordinates: 31°9′21″N 89°50′36″W
- Country: United States
- State: Mississippi
- County: Marion
- Elevation: 148 ft (45 m)
- Time zone: UTC-6 (Central (CST))
  - Summer (DST): UTC-5 (CDT)
- GNIS feature ID: 668362

Cheraw is an unincorporated community in Marion County, Mississippi, United States.

== History ==
Cheraw was founded in 1905, and named after Cheraw, South Carolina, which is in turned named for the Cheraw tribe.

Cheraw is located on the Canadian National Railway.

A post office operated under the name Cheraw from 1905 to 1925.
