= Sebastián Montero =

Spanish missionary

Sebastián Montero (born in Écija) was a Spanish secular priest who was active in the later half of the sixteenth century in North America. In the historical record, Montero was the first person to introduce Christianity in what is now North Carolina.

== Biography ==
Montero was brought by Pedro Menéndez de Avilés to proselytize Native Americans in what was considered the northern limits of Spanish Florida. Montero accompanied explorer Juan Pardo as a chaplain to present-day North Carolina.

In February 1567, the Pardo expedition arrived at a Wateree village called Guatari in what is now Rowan County. The Spaniards called the village Salamanca in honor of the ancient city of Salamanca in western Spain. Pardo left Montero and four soldiers, under the command of Lucas de Cañizares, in the village to establish a Catholic mission. The mission was abandoned around 1572 and Montero subsequently returned to Spain.
