= Keyauwee =

Ethnic group in North Carolina, USA

Keyauwee Indians
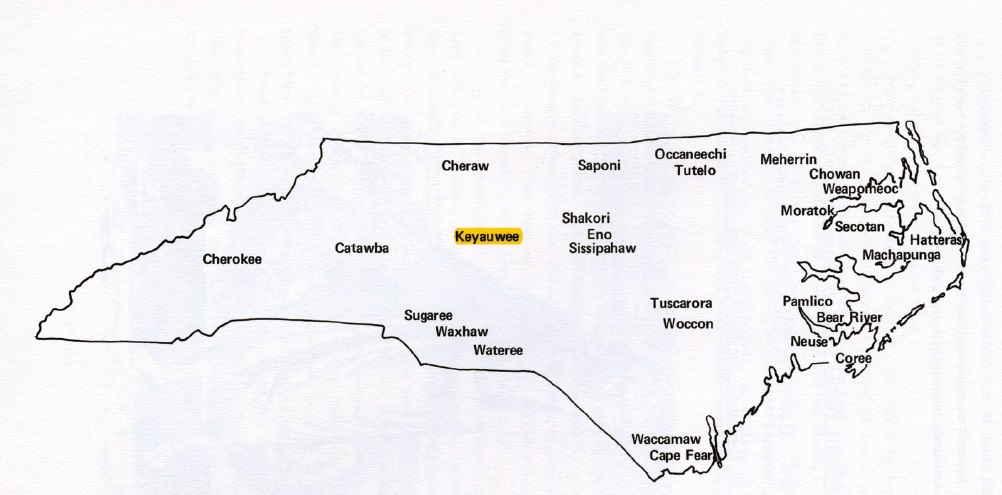
- Map of Indigenous peoples of North Carolina

Total population
- 500 probably merged with Catawba

Regions with significant populations
- United States (North Carolina, South Carolina)

Languages
- unattested, possibly Catawban

Related ethnic groups
- Catawba and Cheraw

The Keyauwee Indians were a small North Carolina tribe, native to the area of present-day Randolph County, North Carolina. The Keyauwee village was surrounded by palisades and cornfields about thirty miles northeast of the Yadkin River, near present-day High Point, North Carolina. The Keyauwee village was vulnerable to attack, so the Keyauwee constantly joined with other tribes for better protection. They joined with the Tutelo, Saponi, Occaneechi, and the Shakori tribes, moving to the Albemarle Sound with the last two for a settlement that would later be foiled. The Keyauwee would move further southward along with the Cheraw and Peedee tribes, close along the border of the two Carolinas, where they conducted deerskin trade with Charleston traders and allied with the Indian neighbors in the Yamassee War. Eventually, their tribe name vanished from historical records, and with time, they were absorbed by the Catawba tribe.

== History ==
=== European contact ===
In 1701, English explorer John Lawson, on an expedition over 1,000 miles, contacted the Keyauwee tribe, a small group which numbered about 500 people. Lawson found the tribe on Caraway Creek in the Caraway mountain range, about fourteen miles south of High Point, North Carolina. Lawson's vivid account of his visit describes the village surrounded by high wooden walls, large cornfields, a large cave where about 100 people could have been able to dine in, all situated by very high mountains. These geographical features of their village are what made the Keyauwee vulnerable to attack.

=== Language and ties to other tribes ===
The term 'Keyauwee' was derived from a Catawban language. Tribal merging in North Carolina was built on relationships of gifting, barter and alliance, and circular rounds of war, peace, and trade. The Keyauwees were motivated to merge with the surrounding North Carolina tribes due to threats of warfare with other tribal nations. Although the merge with the Tutelos and Sapponys was successful, continuous attacks were still experienced by the Keyauwees and their newly combined tribe. Later, the Keyauwees moved towards the Albemarle Sound region, situated on the northeastern coast of North Carolina, to form settlements with the Occaneechi and Shakori tribes. Ultimately, the Keyauwee moved southward from here, moving to the Pee Dee region of South Carolina to merge with the Cheraw tribe, and potentially the Eno and Shakori tribes. It is here where the Keyauwee engaged in deerskin trade along with Charleston traders. According to the Jefferys Atlas of 1761, the Keyauwee settlements appear to be on the North Carolina/South Carolina border, along the Pee Dee River. After fighting along with their Indian allies in the Yamassee War against South Carolina colonists, it is believed that the Keyauwee merged with the Catawba tribe. The Keyauwee tribe merged with local tribes throughout their time due to factors like geographic proximity and having kinship ties.
