= Fort San Juan (Joara) =

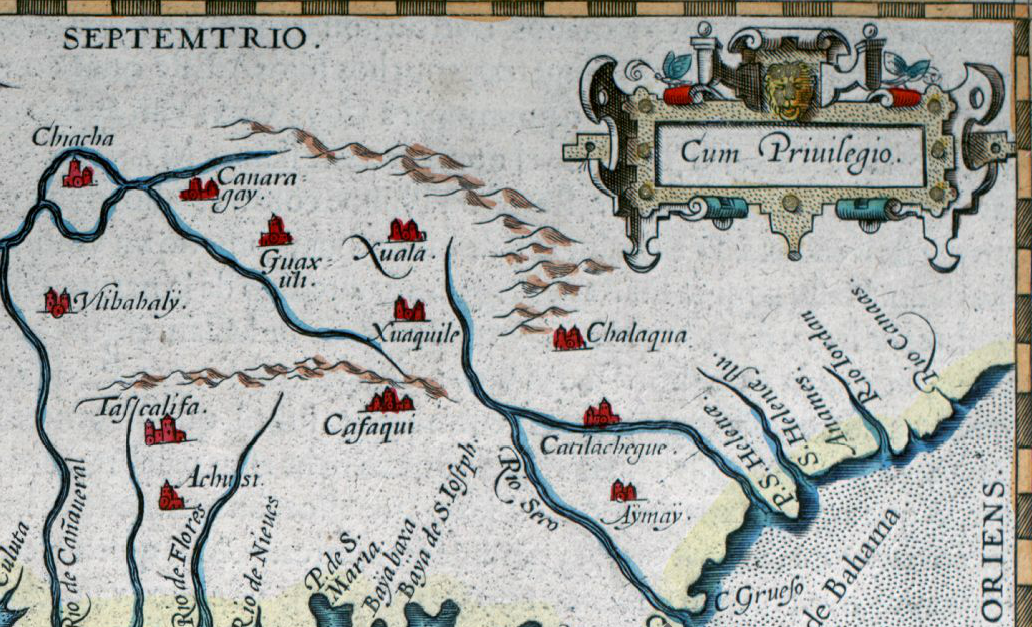
- A portion of a 1584 map by Geronimo Chaves depicting the site of "Xuala" where, in 1567, Juan Pardo established Fort San Juan.

- Location within North Carolina Location within the United States
- 35°49′27″N 81°44′1″W
- Location: Morganton, North Carolina

History
- Built: 1567
- Demolished: 1568

Site notes
- Owner: Privately owned

Fort San Juan was a late 16th-century fort built by the Spanish under the command of conquistador Juan Pardo in the native village of Joara, in what is now Burke County, North Carolina. Used as an outpost for Pardo's expedition into the interior of what was known to the Spaniards as "la Florida", Fort San Juan was the foremost of six forts built and garrisoned by Pardo in modern-day North Carolina, South Carolina, and Tennessee to extend Spain's effective control deeper into the North American continent.

Fort San Juan was the first European settlement in North Carolina and the interior of present-day United States, predating the earliest English settlement at Roanoke Island, North Carolina by 18 years. In 1568, natives from Joara and the region surrounding the fort razed this and the five other Spanish forts, killing all but one of the soldiers.

After the fort's destruction, its exact location was lost. Archaeological work has been underway for years, revealing artifacts suggestive of Spanish settlement. During the summer of 2013, archaeologists affiliated with the University of Michigan, Tulane University and Warren Wilson College announced that they had discovered evidence of a defensive moat and other remains, definitive evidence of Fort San Juan.

== Joara and the Pardo expedition ==
In 1566, a fleet under the command of Pedro Menéndez de Avilés established the coastal mission of Santa Elena on what is now Parris Island in South Carolina. Santa Elena was established to be the headquarters for further Spanish expeditions into the interior of North America, and in this vein, Avilés ordered conquistador Juan Pardo to explore the interior of the new territory, and to find an overland route to Spain's silver-rich holdings in Zacatecas, Mexico, located within what was known as the Viceroyalty of New Spain. Pardo's expedition set out from Santa Elena in December 1566, and followed the routes of the Congaree and Wateree rivers up to the native city of Cofitachequi, which had been visited 26 years prior by Hernando de Soto. The expedition continued along the Wateree past where it becomes the Catawba River (in modern-day naming conventions), arriving in 1567 at the Native American city of Joara (spelled "Xuala" in later Spanish maps).

By 1567, Joara had been occupied by people of the Mississippian culture consistently since the 15th century.

== Establishment of the fort ==
Pardo's expedition was forced to stop at Joara for an extended period of time due to heavy snowfall in the Blue Ridge Mountains, which prevented their progress. During their two-week stay at Joara, Pardo's men constructed Fort San Juan in the style of a blockhouse, and possibly also built a palisade and moat.

== Further expeditions from Fort San Juan ==
After two weeks at Joara, Pardo left a garrison of 30 Spanish soldiers at the newly built fort under the command of Hernando Moyano de Morales. Pardo and the remaining Spaniards headed east, exploring away from the Catawba River, towards the site of the modern-day city of Salisbury. While exploring in that direction, Pardo received word that Santa Elena was being threatened by a French expedition. Pardo returned to Santa Elena, leaving Moyano without support at Fort San Juan. Pardo reached Santa Elena on March 7, 1567. Meanwhile, Moyano set out on an expedition through the mountains toward the Chiaha village of Maniatique (near present-day Saltville, Virginia), which he attacked. Pardo was tasked with returning to Fort San Juan and locating a trail to Zacatecas. Upon reaching Joara, on September 24, 1567, Pardo received word that Moyano was under attack from a force of Native Americans at Chiaha. Pardo arrived at that town on October 7, 1567, and retrieved Moyano and his men, returning with them to Fort San Juan on November 6, 1567.

== Destruction ==
After resting and replenishing supplies at Fort San Juan for two weeks, Pardo and his men began their return voyage to Santa Elena, leaving a garrison of 31 men at the fort. Along the way back to the coast, Pardo constructed several more forts, including one named Santiago and another named Santo Tomás. Pardo arrived at Santa Elena on March 2, 1568, and never returned to the interior of the continent. The fate of the Spanish garrison at Fort San Juan is not exactly known, but it is known that in May 1568, a contingent of Native Americans laid siege to the fort, lured out its garrison, and killed the Spaniards, with the exception of one, Juan de Badejoz, who claimed to have escaped and hidden in the woods. The motivation for doing this was because the Spaniards had taken Native women as concubines. Subsequent to the fort's destruction, the occupants of Joara constructed a ceremonial mound over the site. In recent years, both the earthen mound and overall site area were regularly plowed for agriculture. The mound was bulldozed in 1964 in order to provide fill soil for a nearby low-lying area, presumably the original borrow pit, which was prone to flooding.

== Archaeological work and location ==
Joara's location has been long disputed, but several archaeologists and researchers, including Robin Beck of the University of Michigan, David Moore of Warren Wilson College, and Chris Rodning of Tulane University, announced in 2013 that evidence uncovered at the "Berry Site", an archaeological site revealing the remains of a large Native American settlement in Burke County, North Carolina, definitively demonstrates that that site contains a portion of Joara. Previously, scholars believed that the site of Joara may have been located near the Qualla Boundary in Swain County, North Carolina, or elsewhere in the Appalachian foothills of North Carolina or Tennessee, between Knoxville and the Catawba River.

== Commemoration and current status ==
Despite being unsure of the fort's exact location at the time, in 2008 the State of North Carolina erected a highway historical marker commemorating the fort in Morganton, North Carolina, which had developed in the area. This was based on the findings published from 2004 to 2006 of the results of earlier archaeological work, including Spanish trade goods and tools. Excavation work at and educational outreach concerning the site is supported by the nonprofit Exploring Joara Foundation. The land remains privately owned and permission is required to access it.
