= Wateree people =

Native American tribe

Wateree
Total population
- extinct, merged with Catawba

Regions with significant populations
- United States (South Carolina)

Languages
- unclassified, possibly a Siouan-Catawban language

Religion
- Native American religion

Related ethnic groups
- probably Catawba people

The Wateree were a Native American tribe in the interior of the present-day Carolinas. They probably belonged to the Siouan-Catawban language family. First encountered by the Spanish in 1567 in Western North Carolina, they migrated to the southeast and what developed as South Carolina by 1700, where English colonists noted them.

There they had settled along the Wateree River, near the site of what developed as present-day Camden, South Carolina. Originally a large tribe, they suffered high mortality during the Yamasee War of 1715. By the middle of the 18th century, they joined with the Catawba Nation and lived near the modern Catawba Reservation.

== Language and name ==
Wateree
- Guatari
- Native to: United States
- Region: South Carolina
- Ethnicity: Wateree
- Extinct: after 1744
- Language family: Siouan-Catawban: Catawban; Wateree

Language codes
- ISO 639-3: None (mis)
- Linguist List: 074
- Glottolog: None

The name Wateree may come from Catawban wateran, "to float on the water" or from yeh is-WAH h'reh / ye iswąʔre.

== History ==
=== 16th century ===
This people were recorded in 1567 by Spanish captain Juan Pardo's scribe Juan de la Bandera during their expedition through the interior of the Carolinas. Bandera called them the Guatari in his journal, which was also given as the name of their village. Bandera described them as ruled by a female mico.

=== 17th century ===
The Spaniards noted that Guatari was far from the coast. The settlement is believed to have been in present-day Rowan County, North Carolina. In 1670, English colonists and explorers mentioned the Wateree as inhabiting the area of the upper Yadkin River, to the northwest of their later habitat.

=== 18th century ===
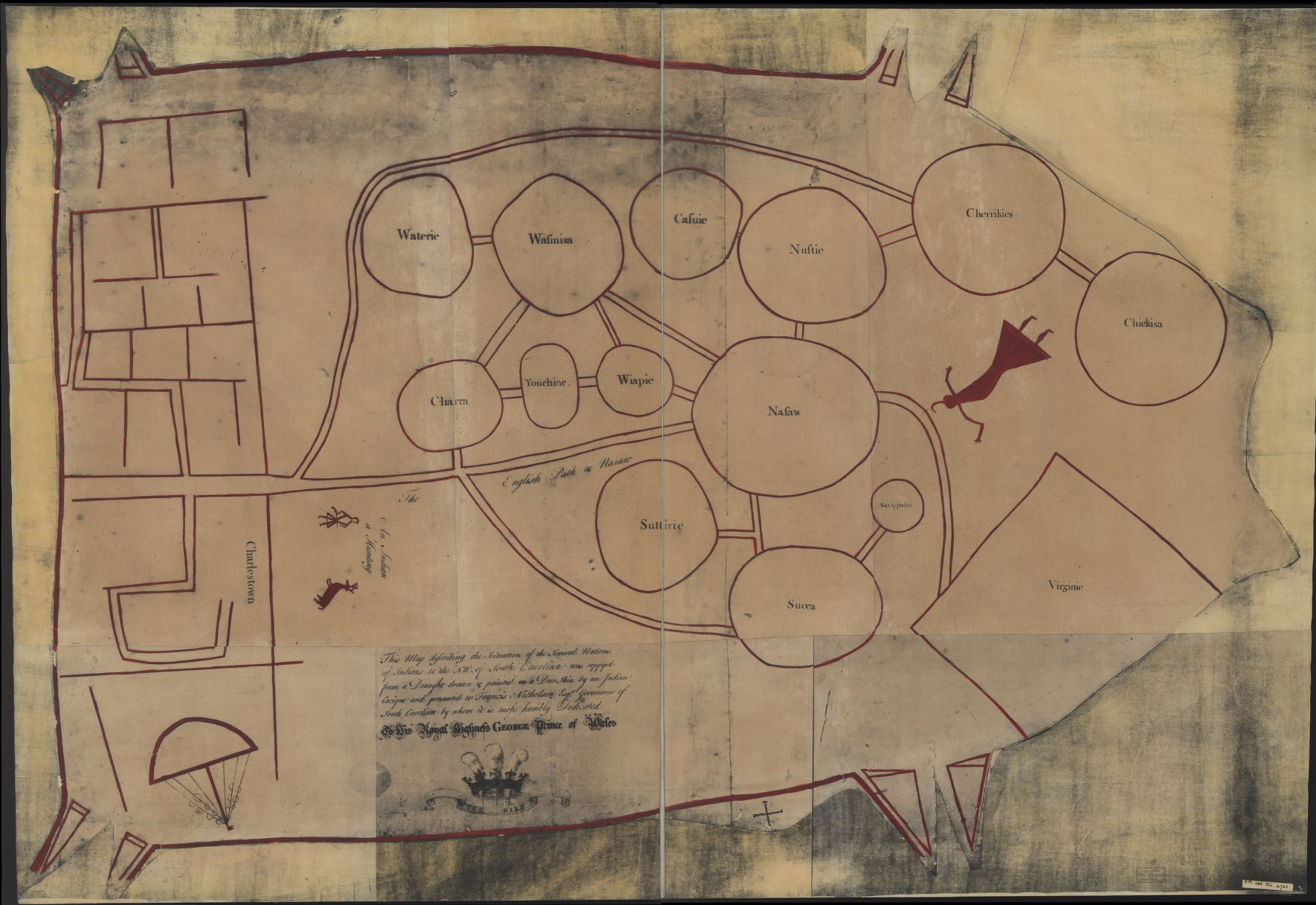
A c. 1724 annotated copy of a deerskin Catawba map of the tribes between Charleston (left) and Virginia (right) following the displacements of a century of disease and enslavement and the 1715–7 Yamasee War. The Wateree are labelled as "Waterie".

By 1700, when observed by John Lawson's expedition, the Wateree had migrated south to settle along the Wateree River near the site of present-day Camden, South Carolina. The British observed that the chiefs of the Wateree had a higher degree of power than those of other Indian tribes of the region.

Originally a large tribe, the Wateree had their power broken during the Yamasee War of 1715 against Carolina colonists. The Wateree became allies in a tribal confederation dominated by the Catawba. The latter tribe absorbed remnant bands of many other tribes of the region from the chaos of intertribal fighting.

"James Adair heard more than twenty different languages spoken by the Indians in the Catawba River settlements when he traded there between 1736 and 1743. This included Eno, Cheraw, Wateree, Congaree, Natchez, Yamasee, Coosah, and others. He could probably have added Saponi, Waccamaw, Pedee, Santee and others to his list. The groups varied in size. If large enough, each language tribe tended to create its own village and appoint its own leaders."

The Wateree appeared to have been able to maintain their culture and distinct language as late as 1744. A record of land sale noted that Wateree Indians sold to a white man. The tribe as a group culture has become extinct, but some present-day Catawba are likely genetic descendants of the Wateree.
