= Francis Le Jau =

- Born: 13 June 1665; La Rochelle, France
- Died: 10 September 1717 (aged 52); Charleston, Province of South Carolina
- Education: Trinity College, Dublin (M.A., 1693; B.D., 1696; D.D., 1700)
- Known for: Anglican Missionary to South Carolina with the Society for the Propagation of the Gospel (SPG)
- Spouse: Jane Antonia Huguenin (m. 1691)
- Children: 2

Francis Le Jau (13 June 1665 - 10 September 1717) was a French missionary to South Carolina with the Society for the Propagation of the Gospel (SPG). Born into a French Huguenot family in the La Rochelle region of France, he later fled to England during the persecution of Huguenots after the revocation of the Edict of Nantes in 1685. He subsequently converted to Anglicanism and eventually graduated from Trinity College, Dublin. In 1700, he moved to St. Christopher's Island where he served for 18 months at the request of Bishop Henry Compton. From 1706 until his death in 1717, Le Jau served as a missionary to South Carolina based in Goose Creek.

== Time in South Carolina ==
Francis Le Jau wrote numerous letters to the Society for the SPG describing events that were taking place in the colony of South Carolina as well as his own activities. He arrived in the colony in December 1706 and describes the colonists celebrating their victory over an attempted invasion launched by the French Captain LeFeboure. He described the attack as having lasted from August 27–31 of 1706 and having involved 5 French vessels of which one was captured along with 230 Frenchmen and 40 more killed while only one South Carolinian was killed in the fighting.

Other major events in the history of the colony that he lived through and described were the Tuscarora War of 1711 and the Yamasee War of 1715. During the Yamasee War his home region of Goose Creek was attacked by a coalition led by the Catawba tribe. He described the group led by the Catawbas as including 300 warriors and notes that many of the men who went with Captain Barker in the first attempt to drive the Catawba from Goose Creek were his parishioners. On May 17, Captain Barker and 26 of his men were killed and a small fort of 30 men, both white and black, was besieged. Le Jau then mentions that his son took part in the June 13th counterattack led by George Chicken which ultimately drove the Catawba and their allies out of the Goose Creek region. Le Jau's son then went on to serve as an aide de camp under Lt. General Maurice Moore for the remainder of the Yamasee War.

== Descriptions of Native Americans ==
He repeatedly referenced the "Savannah tongue" (most likely the Shawnee language) as a trade language that could be understood from the Carolinas to Canada. He believed there was a potential use for missionary work, and sent a copy of the Lord's Prayer in the Savannah language to the SPG. He also referenced the Creek language as one that could be understood throughout the south.

Le Jau was a regular critic of the treatment that Native Americans experienced at the hands of the South Carolina colonists. He describes a Goose Creek plantation owner burning a Native American slave to death on unproven charges that she attempted to burn down the plantation owner's house. He also included some brief descriptions of Native American customs such as the Maramoskees' habit of circumcising their youth and an Etiwan dance telling a story he found to be similar to the story of Noah's Ark.

== Francis Le Jau Baptismal Vows for Slaves ==
Francis Le Jau was a dedicated missionary, wherein evangelism was indisputably one of his highest priorities. Nevertheless, in his evangelization efforts, Jau compromised with slave owners who were concerned that Africans once baptized, would begin to conceptualize and apply freedom and equality to their abhorrent conditions. Thus, Jau composed for African converts a mandatory reciting of the following baptismal vows: “You declare in the presence of God and before this congregation that you do not ask for holy baptism out of any design to free yourself from the Duty and Obedience you owe to your master while you live, but merely for the good of your soul and to partake of the Grace and Blessings promised to the Members of the church of Jesus Christ.”

== Painting ==
Henriette Johnson was a painter, the wife of fellow missionary Gideon Johnson, and shared a French Huguenot background with Le Jau. During the height of the Yamasee War Le Jau's family went to live with the Johnsons in Charleston. At some point in their relationship Henriette painted a portrait of Le Jau.

== See also ==
- List of Christian missionaries
