= Blair A. Rudes =

American linguist

- Rudes in 2005
- Born: May 18, 1951; Gloversville, New York, U.S.
- Died: March 16, 2008 (aged 56); Charlotte, North Carolina, U.S.
- Education: University at Buffalo (BA, MA, PhD)
- Known for: The New World (2005); The Ruins (2008)
- Scientific career
- Fields: Linguistics
- Workplaces: UNC Charlotte

Blair Arnold Rudes (May 18, 1951 – March 16, 2008) was an American linguist and professor at the University of North Carolina at Charlotte best known for his expertise in Native American languages. He was hired in 2004 to reconstruct the long extinct Powhatan language for use in the film The New World.

== Early life and education ==
Blair A. Rudes was born on May 18, 1951, in Gloversville, New York. He said his mother was of Irish descent and his great-grandmother was Abenaki. He studied at Piseco Elementary School and Wells Central High School as a child, before going on to the State University of New York at Buffalo, where he obtained a doctorate in linguistics in 1976.

== Career ==
Rudes became an assistant professor of English at the University of North Carolina, Charlotte in 1999 and was promoted to an associate professor in 2005. As a scholar, he is most well known for writing the Tuscarora Dictionary, which the University of Toronto Press published in 1999. He also published over twenty articles in scholarly journals and helped edit several books. In 2004 Rudes was hired to reconstruct the Powhatan language for use in Terrence Malick's 2005 film The New World. He utilized Colonial-era word lists, along with scholarly work, and filled in linguistic blanks by using better attested Eastern Algonquian languages. Initially, one scene consisting of three pages of dialogue took him one month to reconstruct. Pleased with the results, Malick wanted to film fifty additional scenes in Powhatan. Rudes spent two weeks in a hotel room translating dialogue and then coached actors of how to properly pronounce their lines. His contributions to the film attracted widescale publicity, including a feature story in the Science Section of the New York Times. At Rude's request, the movie studio made his work available to Algonquian tribes located in Virginia so that members could relearn their ancestral language. His work additionally helped dispel a longstanding belief that the term "Chesapeake" meant "Great Shellfish Bay" in Powhatan. Rudes discovered that in actuality, it probably means "Great Water". Impressed by Rudes' work on The New World, director Carter Smith hired him as the Mayan Dialogue Coach for The Ruins.

== Personal life ==
Dr. Rudes was a polyglot, among the languages he could speak were French, German, Irish Gaelic, Italian, Russian, and Tuscarora. He was a gay man and was predeceased by his companion, Philip Hunt. He had two dogs, Heidi and Ben.

== Death ==
Rudes died of a heart attack on March 16, 2008, after working out at a gym in Charlotte, North Carolina. At the time of his death, he was working on a three volume work titled "The Catawba Language" for the University of South Carolina Press.

== Awards ==
Dr. Rudes was the recipient of several honors. In 2006 he was recognized by the Tuscorora Indian Nation for his contributions to preserving their language and in 2007, the South Carolina General Assembly passed a resolution recognizing the work he had done for the South Carolina Commission for Minority Affairs. On April 5, 2008, he was posthumously awarded the University at Buffalo’s Distinguished Alumni Award.

== Selected bibliography ==
- Tuscarora-English / English-Tuscarora Dictionary, 1999
- Endangered Languages and Literacy: Proceedings of the Fourth FEl Conference, Nicholas Ostler (editor), Blair A. Rudes (editor), Foundation for Endangered Languages, 2000
