= Juan Pardo (explorer) =

16th-century Spanish explorer

Juan Pardo was a Spanish explorer who was active in the latter half of the 16th century. He led a Spanish expedition from the Atlantic coast through what is now North and South Carolina and into eastern Tennessee on the orders of Pedro Menéndez de Avilés, in an attempt to find an inland route to a silver-producing town in Mexico.

In 1566 Menéndez had built Fort San Felipe and established Santa Elena on present-day Parris Island; these were the first Spanish settlements in what is now South Carolina. While leading his expedition deeper into the interior, Pardo founded Fort San Juan at Joara, the first European settlement in the interior of North Carolina, and five additional forts in what are the modern U.S. states of North Carolina, Tennessee, and South Carolina. These five forts were Fort San Pedro near Chiaha, Fort San Pablo on the French Broad River, Fort Santiago near modern Salisbury, North Carolina, Fort Santo Tomás near Cofitachequi, and Fuerta de Nostra Señora north of Santa Elena.

== New World exploration ==
Pardo led two expeditions from Santa Elena into the interior of the present-day southeastern United States. The first, from December 1, 1566, to March 7, 1567, numbered 125 men who went to seek food and to establish bases among the region's indigenous people. He established Fort San Juan at Joara, a Mississippian culture center (near present-day Morganton, North Carolina) and left a garrison behind. Claiming the settlement for Spain, he renamed it Cuenca in honor of his Spanish city Cuenca.

Pardo led a second expedition from September 1, 1567, to March 2, 1568, and explored the Piedmont interior and south along the Appalachian Mountains. He established an additional five forts to the west of Joara, intended to supply a land route to Zacatecas in present-day Mexico, where the Spanish had silver mines they wanted to protect. The Spanish mistakenly thought the Appalachians were connected to a central Mexican mountain range. Pardo returned to Santa Elena when he learned of a French raid there.

Later in 1568, the Native Americans turned against Pardo's garrisons in the interior, killing all but one of the 120 Spaniards and burning down all six forts. The Spanish did not make another effort to colonize the interior of North Carolina.

In 1569, Pardo left the Florida colony to return to Spain; no further details about his life and death are known after that.

== Archaeological evidence ==
Since 1986, archaeologists working at the Berry Site near Morganton have found evidence of Mound Builders, burned huts and 16th-century Spanish artifacts. There is strong scholarly consensus that this is the site of Joara and Fort San Juan. In 2007, the archaeologists fully excavated one of the burned huts. They found Spanish ceramic olive jar fragments and iron plate from a 16th-century brigandine type armor, typical of what the expedition would have used. The Joara and Fort San Juan sites are being excavated through the Joara Foundation and a partnership with Warren Wilson College.

A stone speculated, but unsubstantiated, to have been inscribed by Pardo or one of his men is in the collection of the Spartanburg County Public Library. Considered a "portable petroglyph", it is inscribed with a parallelogram, a pictograph of the sun pointing away from it, and the date "1567". The stone was found in 1934 by a farmer near Inman, South Carolina.

== See also ==
- Chisca
