= Proto-Siouan language =

Common ancestor of the Siouan languages

Proto-Siouan
- Reconstruction of: Western Siouan languages
- Region: Ohio River Valley
- Era: c. 2000 BC

Proto-Siouan (/ˌproʊtoʊ ˈsuː.ən/ PROH-toh SOO-ən) is the reconstructed ancestor of the Western Siouan languages, also called Siouan proper. Although the attested daughter languages are largely native to the Great Plains region of the United States and Canada, Proto-Siouan is believed to have been originally spoken in and around the Ohio River Valley around 2000 BC, when it split off from the Eastern Siouan languages, also called the Catawban languages. Siouan-speaking peoples were eventually displaced or assimilated after losing several wars of conquest against their northern Haudenosaunee neighbors during the 17th century, but their presence in and around Appalachia is supported by studies of placenames and other proper names in the region.

Proto-Siouan phonology had five oral and three nasal vowels, each with long and short variants, and a complex set of consonants including a four-way stop distinction. The language also distinguished at least two tones, high and non-high, though a falling tone may have also been present. Grammatically, Proto-Siouan demonstrated subject–object–verb word order and was head-marking, as agreement affected the head rather than modifiers or dependents. The language also used simple agglutination, meaning that it stacked a few affixes together with different meanings rather than using a single affix to convey several different meanings simultaneously. It had an active–stative morphosyntactic alignment and used sound symbolism, phonesthemes, and apophony as ways of conveying meaning, sometimes in combination.

== History ==
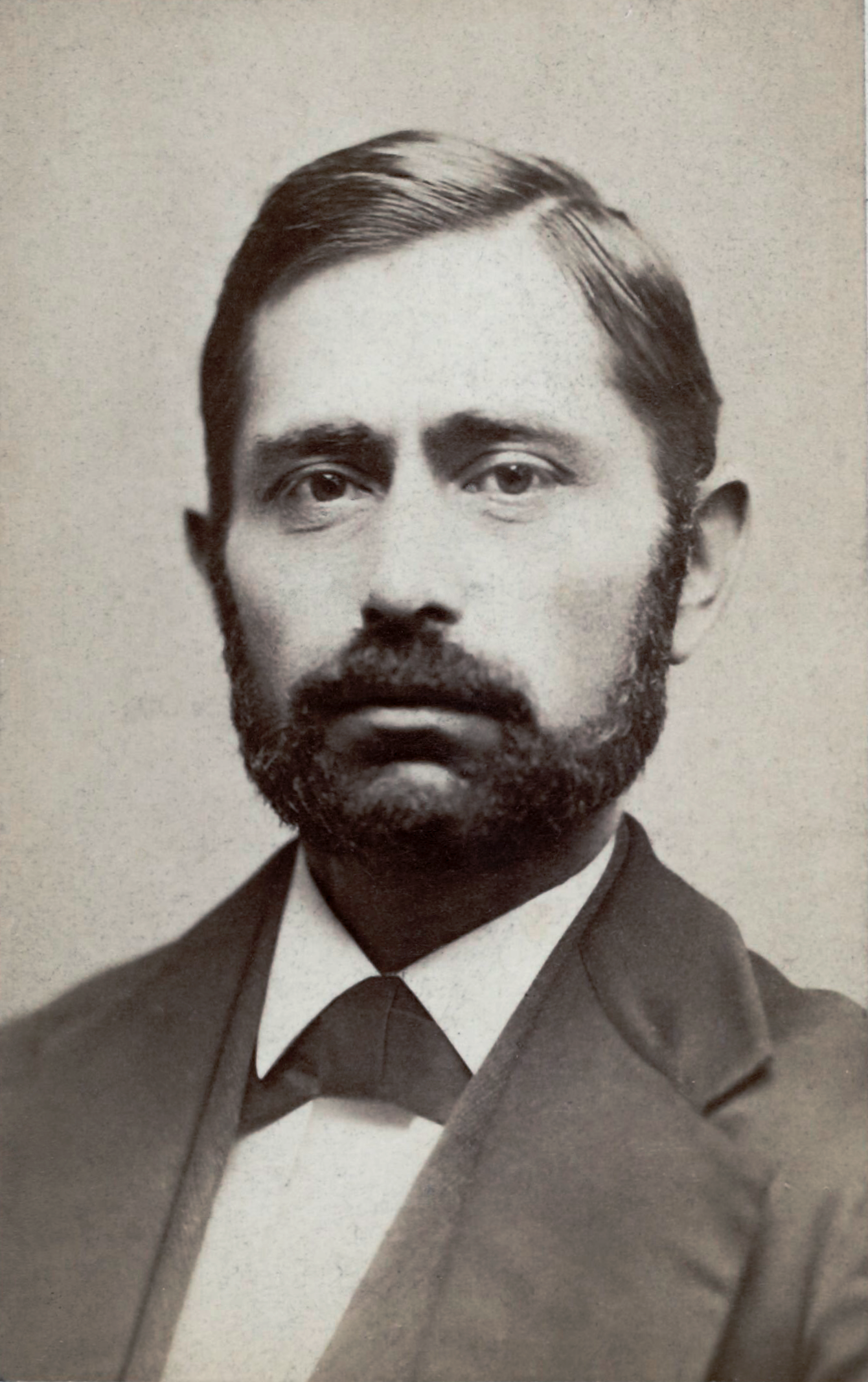
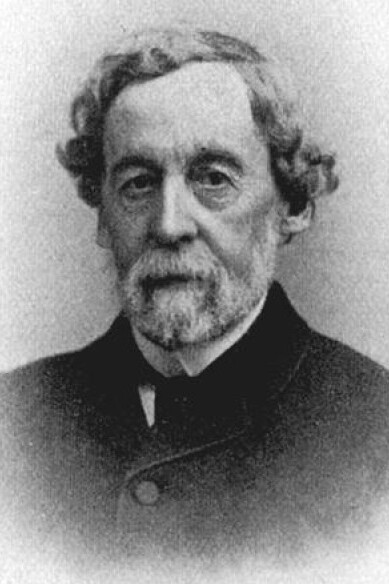
Albert Gatschet (left) and Horatio Hale both recognized the relationship of some eastern Siouan-speaking peoples to those of the Great Plains in the 1880s.

The Proto-Siouan language is the reconstructed ancestor of the Western Siouan languages. The language family was first identified as an interrelated group in 1836 by Albert Gallatin, a Genevan-American ethnologist, who named it after its most widely recognized ethnolinguistic group, the Sioux. In 1881, the Swiss-American scholar Albert Gatschet documented the Catawba language of South Carolina and commented on its similarity to the Siouan languages of the Great Plains of North America. Two years later, Horatio Hale similarly linked the Tutelo language of Virginia to other Great Plains Siouan languages in his 1883 description of the tribe. In 1836, Gallatin built on the work of Johann Adelung and Johann Vater, describing the Siouan and Catawban languages as sister branches of one family. Work published by Frank Siebert in 1945 is considered to have definitively proven the relationship.

In 1984, several Siouanists led by David S. Rood began compiling a comparative dictionary after receiving funding from the National Endowment for the Humanities and National Science Foundation. Though advanced copies of the dictionary were distributed in 1997 and again in 2006, the project broke down following the "retirement, disappearance, or focus shift" of most of the staff after the unexpected death of Robert L. Rankin, its most comprehensive contributor, in February 2014. The dictionary was published in May 2015 with its original commentary.

Although historians have identified at least twenty-five Siouan-speaking ethnic groups, dialectal differences and, in some cases, scant attestations, or documented evidence of a speech variety, make determining the precise number of Siouan languages difficult. David Rood and John E. Koontz estimate that there are between fifteen and eighteen attested Siouan languages. Rankin puts the number at simply "more than fifteen".

== Origins ==
=== Dating ===
Proto-Siouan's parent language, Proto-Siouan–Catawban, was probably spoken around 3000 BC, splitting off into the Eastern Siouan and Western Siouan languages around a thousand years later. Earlier efforts to date the language differed drastically, from the end of the Pleistocene around 9700 BC to around 800 AD, but archeological records and research into shared vocabulary have yielded a narrower estimate of around five thousand years ago. Glottochronological dating, which treats replacements in a language's vocabulary as having a relatively consistent rate over time, in determining the Eastern–Western split similarly yielded mixed results, though modern linguistics no longer regards this method as scientifically sound. Rankin argued that this split should be dated to roughly 2000 BC.

Archeological evidence may also help in dating Proto-Siouan. The gourd species Cucurbita pepo, for example, has been used as one basis for this estimate; cucurbits begin to appear in the archeological records between around 3400 BC and 2300 BC. The Siouan languages share a commonly derived term for the plant across great geographic and phylogenetic distances, such as in the case of the Mandan language, formerly spoken in North Dakota, and the Biloxi language, formerly spoken in Mississippi and Louisiana. The Proto-Siouan term for these cucurbits has been reconstructed as *hkó•re or *ahkó•re and its descendants include Crow kakúwi ('squash, pumpkin'), Mandan kóore ('squash'), Biloxi aḳodí ('gourd, gourd cup'), and Osage 𐓥𐓪𐓥𐓪́𐓨𐓘 (hkohkó ma; 'cucumber'). (Note: The American linguist Carolyn Quintero suggests the Osage term may be "possibly borrowed from English cucumber". Rankin (2003) cites it as a native reflex of the Proto-Siouan term, though Rankin et al. (2015) does not rule out contamination from French or English.) By the time these gourds were domesticated as a food source around 1000 BC, evidence suggests that the family had already split into its four main branches: Missouri River Siouan, Mississippi Valley Siouan, Ohio Valley Siouan, and Mandan, with the Mississippi Valley languages already showing signs of further division.

Several other terms for plants have helped linguists frame and reconstruct lower phylogenetic relationships within the Western Siouan family. For example, the languages do not share a common term for corn; thus, the first divisions of Proto-Siouan precede corn's introduction from Mesoamerica around 200 AD. Terms related to the agricultural production of corn are pervasive in the Siouan languages, which allows for much more stable estimates for timing since, although one word may fall out of use in any language at any point during its history, a cluster of related words is less likely to all be replaced. The terms for corn are fairly disparate. For example, the Mandan term kóoxą'te (lit. 'gourd grass') was borrowed into Hidatsa (kóoxaati) and Crow (xóoxaashi) after the Mandan probably introduced either the plant itself or techniques related to its cultivation; Ofo and Biloxi borrowed their term from a Caddoan language, whereas the other languages typically adapted a dated term for squash.

=== Location ===
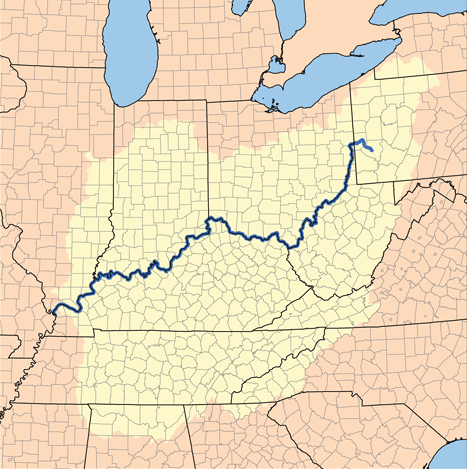
The Ohio River Valley (in yellow) is considered the original location of Proto-Siouan.

Although the modern Siouan languages are mostly spoken in the Great Plains, scholars believe that Proto-Siouan originated in the Ohio River Valley. Earlier scholarship, namely the work of the American archeologist James Bennett Griffin in the mid-20th century, argued that the Siouan languages were originally spoken somewhere in the Allegheny Piedmont in modern-day Virginia and North Carolina. Siouan-speaking peoples had a wide area of influence in the eastern regions of the modern-day United States. Horatio Hale, for example, noticed that several toponyms in the Appalachian region appeared to be of Siouan origin, especially between Virginia and North Carolina. Other onomastic data has helped to confirm this view. The oral history of modern Siouan-speaking peoples also provides some support; John R. Swanton gathered some accounts from speakers which indicated a homeland east of the Ohio River, and the Hidatsa people indicated similar origins in accounts given to Washington Matthews. A Kaw chieftain recounted to James Owen Dorsey that his people originated in modern-day New York abutting the Atlantic, which they called the "Great Water".

The westward migration began as a result of several wars of conquest over hunting grounds by the Haudenosaunee pushing southward from their own homeland in the Finger Lakes region of Western and Central New York. Successive Haudenosaunee victories caused a massive displacement of Siouan-speaking populations, probably occurring during the 1600s following an increase in European colonization efforts on the American Eastern Seaboard and the start of the Beaver Wars. However, the push was neither instantaneous nor universal; the Lakota are attested near modern-day Chicago in 1648, with estimates of their migration over the Mississippi River placed sometime around the turn of the 18th century. Other Siouan-speaking peoples were adopted by the Haudenosaunee; (Note: Historically, the Haudenosaunee practiced two kinds of integration for foreigners into their confederacy, typically known as "adoption": Assimilative adoption usually involved prisoners of war who were offered survival at the cost of their original identities and then subjected to harsh conditions during a probationary period. Afterward, they were considered fully Haudenosaunee.; Associative adoption was the wholesale adoption of a large group, including whole nations, typically after they had reached a clear defeat point in combat against the Haudenosaunee. The survivors were given an offer to retain their identity, but incorporate Haudenosaunee practices. They would fall under both Haudenosaunee protection and jurisdiction.; The size of these adoptive classes is the subject of scholarly debate.) the Tutelo people, for example, were formally adopted in 1753 and settled around Cayuga Lake, one of the Finger Lakes, in 1771. They remained with the Cayuga people during their subsequent migration to Canada following the American Revolution.

The displaced tribes' migration from the Ohio River Valley obfuscated the relationship of some of the languages; some such as Biloxi and Ofo were pushed into, and influenced by, the Lower Mississippi Valley sprachbund, or linguistic area. The Ofo language, spoken in modern-day Ohio before being forced out by the Haudenosaunee, was thought for many years to be a member of the Muskogean languages of the Deep South, in part because it contained the phoneme /f/, which is absent from all other Siouan languages. In 1908, Swanton met an Ofo speaker, Rosa Pierrette, living among the Tunica people in Marksville, Louisiana. His work linked the language to the Dakota language in the Great Plains. Gatschet's published work on Biloxi, then spoken in the Gulf Coast regions of modern-day Mississippi and Louisiana, placed it within the Siouan family; his work was later supported by Dorsey's ethnographic work on the tribe in 1893.

== Phonology ==
=== Vowels ===
Proto-Siouan's vowel system had five oral vowels and three nasal vowels, each of which had contrastive vowel length. The vowels reconstructed for Proto-Siouan are as follows:

	Front		Central		Back	
	Oral	Nasal	Oral	Nasal	Oral	Nasal
Close	*i *i•	*į *į•			*u *u•	*ų *ų•
Mid	*e *e•				*o *o•	
Open			*a *a•	*ą *ą•		

It is possible that an earlier form of the language, known as "pre-Proto-Siouan", (Note: The term pre-Proto-Siouan refers to an intermediate language between the end of Proto-Siouan–Catawban and Proto-Siouan.) had nasalized forms of *e and *o, but these may have been lost as the result of a merger with the oral forms. Because most Siouan languages contrast vowel length, vowels in Proto-Siouan have been reconstructed as having both long and short forms. Understanding vowel length in the family's extinct members has proven difficult, as earlier fieldwork with Siouan languages did not typically discuss vowel length at all. Length in Proto-Siouan was probably somewhat predictable and may have affected tone in the daughter languages. When short vowels occurred before a stressed syllable, they were often deleted if the first consonant of the unstressed syllable was a sonorant, such as *r or *w; this process remained productive in several descendant languages as well. All examples of nasal consonants in modern Siouan languages are explainable through series of sonorants followed by nasal vowels; for example, when *w is followed by a nasal vowel, it may become [m].

=== Consonants ===
The consonants have been reconstructed as follows:

		Labial	Alveolar	Palatal	Velar	Glottal
Stop	plain	*p	*t		*k	*ʔ
Stop	preaspirated	*hp	*ht		*hk	
Stop	aspirated	*ph	*th		*kh	
Stop	glottalized	*pʔ	*tʔ		*kʔ	
Fricative	plain		*s	*š	*x	*h
Fricative	glottalized		*sʔ	*šʔ	*xʔ	
Sonorant	plain	*w	*r	*y		
Sonorant	"funny"	*W	*R			

The language contained two consonants known as "funny w" and "funny r", written as *W and *R, respectively. Although these consonants are thought to have been similar to *w and *r, their reflexes – or, how those sounds developed in later attested languages – are distinct. Reflexes of *w and *r remained sonorant in the descendant languages, but *W and *R typically become obstruents or sonorant–stop clusters. Evidence suggests that *W may have been the result of a geminated *w, or long consonant. This geminate is thought to have typically crossed a morpheme boundary, or more rarely when *w was abutting a laryngeal consonant. The origin of the *R phoneme is less clear, though it may represent *r clustering with a laryngeal or some other consonant. The phoneme *r tends towards similar reflexes when in clusters such as *wr, *sr, and *šr. Similarly, Mandan evidence supports that a rhotic–glottal stop cluster may have led to *R. Linguists have attempted to remove these phonemes from the inventory, though none have been successful. More recently, scholars such as Juliette Blevins have argued that "funny w" and "funny r" may be better represented as voiced stops [b] and [d], respectively.

==== Carter's law ====
Proto-Siouan has also been reconstructed with preaspirated stops, where consonants are pronounced with a preceding [h]. Several Siouan languages either retain a preaspirated series or have a distinct set of reflexes; in either case, this set is treated as a single unit in syllabification and segmentation. The preaspirated series was not originally contrastive in pre-Proto-Siouan, but rather the result of a regular phonological process whereby plain voiceless stops were preaspirated whenever the following vowel was stressed. This process has been termed Carter's law, after Richard T. Carter, who first described the phenomenon in his work on Ofo. This change was later phonemicized and several sets of cognates attest the set as distinct phonemes.

Although this series is considered to have been phonemic, several languages – including Hidatsa, Crow, and Mandan – later lost this series. (Note: Strictly speaking, modern Hidatsa does exhibit preaspiration, though it is the result of another process causing /x/ to lenite to [h] before /k/.) In Ofo, Ho-Chunk, the Dakotan languages, and the Chiwere dialects, the preaspiration became postaspiration, where the [h] sound occurs immediately after the consonant, though these changes occurred independently and do not express a family-internal phylogenetic relationship. In the Dhegihan languages, preaspirated consonants either remained preaspirated or changed into plain geminates.

Because the development of the stop series is so transparent, the consonant inventory is sometimes presented in a minimalist fashion, which removes the complex stop series and glottalized forms. Rankin, Carter, and A. Wesley Jones suggest that a pre-Proto-Siouan consonant inventory without this phonological conditioning may have existed at an earlier date. This minimalist inventory is also a closer match to that of the Catawba language. The minimalist form is as follows:

	Labial	Alveolar	Palatal	Velar	Glottal
Stop	**p	**t		**k	**ʔ
Fricative		**s	**š	**x	**h
Sonorant	**w	**r	**y		

=== Tone and prosody ===
Stress was typically placed on the second syllable of a Proto-Siouan word. The stressed vowel was typically long, though this is not universal. The language's maximal syllable structure was probably CCV, though syllable-initial clusters are typically bimorphemic and roots routinely consist of a single CV structure. Examples of single-morpheme CCV roots include *kšą ('bend'); its descendants include Dakota kšą́ ('crooked'), Biloxi ktcaⁿ ('next to, next one'), and Osage 𐓬𐓘𐓯𐓪́͘ (bashóⁿ; 'crooked, river bend'). Consonant clusters at the beginning of syllables in descendant Siouan languages often derive from later sound changes. In Mandan and Lakota, for example, the Proto-Siouan prefixes *wa-, marking inanimate absolutives and indefinite third-person objects, and *wi-, marking animals, often collapsed into a single-phoneme prefix independently in both languages, leading to a CCV syllable cluster with its stem. Examples include Proto-Siouan *wišį́•ka ('flying squirrel') becoming Lakota pšįčá. Other CCV roots are often the result of phonesthemic forms, a kind of sound symbolism used for groups of sounds or sound-producing motions. Some reconstructed CVC syllables have been identified, but they are incredibly rare and several are semantically obscure. Examples include *-puS- ('vermin insect'), where the capital S is a sound symbolic fricative gradation; examples of descendants include Osage 𐓻𐓘́𐓬𐓶𐓯𐓤𐓘 (zhábiuçka, 'ant'), Hidatsa waapúkša ('insect, snake') and Crow baapúxta ('insect').

Proto-Siouan had at least two contrastive tones: high, which is marked with an acute accent (◌́) on the vowel, and non-high, which is unmarked. It is possible that the language also had a falling tone, marked with a circumflex (◌̂). Although the existence of a falling tone is common both areally and typologically, Proto-Siouan is not typically reconstructed as having a falling tone. It is possible that the falling tone existed at an earlier point, perhaps in pre-Proto-Siouan, and the tone's interaction with plain stops resulted in the glottalized stop series. In several daughter languages, if the stressed syllable had a falling tone, it lost this tone and became glottalized. Examples of this process include the reconstructed form *kû ('give'). In Proto-Siouan, this falling tone shifted to *kuʔ in Proto–Missouri Valley Siouan and Proto-Mandan, exhibiting a non-high tone with a word-final glottal stop inserted at the end. In modern Crow, the glottal stop was vocalized, leading to kúu with both a long vowel and high tone; modern Mandan and Hidatsa maintained the syllable-final stop. These processes may be represented thus:

Stage I (Note: Either Proto-Siouan or pre-Proto-Siouan)	*kû		
Stage II	*kuʔ		
Stage III	kúu	kuʔ	*ʔku
	Modern Crow	Modern Hidatsa/Modern Mandan	Proto–Ohio Valley (Note: Outcomes of this reconstructed term include Biloxi ku, Ofo ạkhú, and Tutelo ñgō/ⁿgo.)

In the Mississippi Valley Siouan languages – including Chiwere–Ho-Chunk, the Dhegihan languages, and the Dakota languages – these excrescent glottal stops switched places with the vowel and continued as a class of glottalized stops. In Ohio Valley Siouan, the stop appears to have switched to the beginning of the syllable, leading to unique outcomes in the daughter languages there such as an additional vowel to the beginning of the word, as in Ofo, or initial prenasalized consonants where a [n]-like sound precedes the consonant, as in Tutelo. An alternative reconstruction of this term considers the original Proto-Siouan term to have been *kʔu, with a glottalized initial stop.

=== Ablaut ===
All attested Siouan languages express a final-vowel root alternation known as ablaut, which is reconstructable to Proto-Siouan. Typically, this alternation is between -a and -e, though some languages also include a word-final -i or -į. There is no clear phonological condition under which this ablaut occurs. Possibilities include that they may be determined by suffixes, postclitics, the following words, or potentially nothing at all in phrase-final conditions. The ablaut can be seen in examples from Lakota, where káğe ('s/he made it'), káğa he? ('did s/he make it?'), and káğiŋ kte ('s/he will make it') show the tripartite division, all derived from an ablauting root – káğA ('to make something') – where the capital A signifies the alternating vowel.

=== Sound symbolism ===
The Siouan languages exhibit what is called fricative-graded sound symbolism, sometimes termed spirant gradation, a pervasive kind of sound symbolism where fricative consonants change pronunciation to indicate a change in meaning. The pervasiveness of this symbolic use of language makes reconstruction back to Proto-Siouan possible. This sound symbolism is used to express gradation in intensity, volume, roughness, and other similar concepts. In Lakota, for example, the root set meaning 'crack' has several forms based on the intensity of the damage: -suzA- for a single crack, -šužA- for a few cracks or a bad bruising, and -ȟuǧA- for fractured or crushed.

Proto-Siouan also contained a series of root-initial consonant clusters used to describe certain kinds of sounds or sound-producing motions; these clusters are collectively known as phonesthemes. Like the spirant gradation previously described, these roots often differ through the realization of the vowel, of spirant gradation, or as a result of both. Examples include series symbolizing ripping – *sré- ('split'), *šré- ('split, shred'), and *xré- ('rip, tear') – and series symbolizing slippery motions or actions – *srą́- ('dribble'), *srí- ('ooze out, slurp, lick'), *srú- ('slide, masturbate'). These series are sometimes reconstructed with an *l instead of an *r and are similar to the English-language sl- equivalents, such as slime, sludge, slick, and slobber.

== Grammar ==
Given the widespread use of object–verb syntax among the Siouan languages, Proto-Siouan had a constituent word order of subject–object–verb (SOV). Adverbs were able to appear on either side of the verb. It was head-marking, meaning that agreement was marked on the head rather than on modifiers or dependents, and adjectives followed their head nouns. The language appears to have been more analytic than its modern descendants, governed more by adpositions and particles than by affixation. Proto-Siouan was a somewhat agglutinative language, which means that affixes with different meanings were stacked one after another rather than a single affix being used to convey several different meanings simultaneously. There was also a tendency towards simple incorporation, wherein terms in different grammatical categories could merge into one while retaining their distinct syntactic functions, though its output in Proto-Siouan was generally more in line with basic compounding. The language's morphosyntactic alignment was active–stative. Eventually, each of the Ohio Valley Siouan languages independently lost active–stative agreement, but they are unique in this way among Siouan languages. Although some descendants mark for the inclusion of the listener in certain pronouns or have an involuntary desiderative mood, (Note: The semantic meaning of the involuntary desiderative is something akin to 'feel like' or 'need to', as in the Hidatsa word maeexíhtihisaacic ('I kind of have to pee').) both of which occur in Hidatsa and Crow, these are not reconstructable in Proto-Siouan.

Verbs in Proto-Siouan were inflected for person, number, aspect, mode, tense, instrument, and likely other markers. Attested Siouan languages mark variously for grammatical gender, evidentiality (how the information related is known by the speaker), and quotativity (when speech is quoted), though it is unclear which of these were present in Proto-Siouan, if any. At least three locative markers – *a- ('on, at'), *o- ('in'), and *i- ('toward') – as well as the general instrumental prefix *í-, were probably proclitics. They were not true affixes in Proto-Siouan, or even pre-Proto-Siouan, like they are in the daughter languages, as evidence indicates that they had stressed long vowels. The language's first- and second-person agent markers – *w(a)- and *y(a)-, respectively – similarly do not undergo expected changes in stress so they are also believed to have been proclitics. The only reconstructable elements of the verbal template are the root, first- and second-person agent markers, and dative-possessive markers.

Proto-Siouan also had a tripartite system for verbs of motion. This system maps the departure, progression, and arrival of an agent (the noun moving) against a deictic center (where the agent begins the movement), a "home base", and an apogee (when the agent begins the return to their home base). The home base is described as a "location to which the traveler belongs", which may have a long duration like a home or workplace or a shorter one such as a meeting or social gathering. The system has been reconstructed for Proto-Siouan–Catawban as follows, where the capital E represents an ablauting vowel:

		Departure	Progression	Arrival
Away from deictic center	Away from base	*hi•rÉ• ('leave here to go there')	*rÉ• ('going there')	*hí• ('arrive there')
Away from deictic center	Toward base	*ki•krÉ• ('leave here to go back there')	*krÉ• ('going back there')	*kí• ('arrive back there')
Toward deictic center	Away from base	*rhi•hú• ('leave there to go here')	*hú• ('coming here')	*rhí• ('arrive here')
Toward deictic center	Toward base	*kri•kú• ('leave there to go back here')	*kú• ('coming back here')	*krí• ('arrive back here')

Among the Siouan languages, instrumentally prefixed verbs comprise the vast majority of active verbs. These verbs consist of a root, which is typically a bound morpheme, in combination with a prefix which expresses the manner by which the action is achieved, such as *aRá ('by heating') or *ra ('using the mouth'). In Proto-Siouan, these prefixes probably began as either proclitics or independent verbs, as they do not undergo the same phonological changes found in other prefixes. They may have also been derived from some kind of compounding or some other opaque derivational system. Because they behave differently from other affixes, they are sometimes termed "root extensions", especially since the root verb cannot usually stand on its own without them.

Proto-Siouan had a series of verbs – *rą́•ke ('sit'), *rahé ('stand', inanimate), *hą́•ke ('stand', animate), *ʔų́•ke ('lie'), and *rį́• ('move') – which are used in all its descendants to mark the continuative aspect, except for the Dhegihan subfamily. In Lakota, for example, the term hą ('standing') can be used to show that a process is or was ongoing, as in Iktó kákhena íčimaniya hą ('Ikto was starting off on a journey'). In all of the attested Dhegihan languages, these aspectual functions were lost, but the terms came to be used as a kind of class marker for definite nouns. For example, in Omaha–Ponca, a singular, non-agentive animate noun was marked with ðį, as in tté-žįga ðį ('the [moving] buffalo calf'); singular nouns – irrespective of animacy – seen as "lying down" in some sense, were marked with khe, as in waˀú khe ('the [reclining] woman') or né khe ('the lake').

== See also ==
- Classification of the Indigenous languages of the Americas
- Dorsey's law
- List of proto-languages
- Proto-Iroquoian language
