= Robert L. Rankin =

American linguist (1939–2014)

- Rankin holding one of his Shetland Sheepdogs
- Born: January 17, 1939; Bellefonte, Pennsylvania, US
- Died: February 24, 2014 (aged 75); Kansas City, Missouri, US
- Spouse: Carolyn Ann Leverance (m. 1965)
- Awards: Fulbright Fellowship

Academic background
- Education: University of Chicago
- Thesis: Word Final High Vowels in Rumanian: Problems in Synchronic and Diachronic Dialectology (1972)

Academic work
- Discipline: Historical linguistics; language documentation; Native American linguistics
- Sub-discipline: Siouan linguistics; Muskogean linguistics; Romanistics
- Institutions: University of Kansas
- Main interests: Language documentation; historical linguistics; lexicography

Robert Louis Rankin (January 17, 1939 – February 24, 2014) was an American linguist and scholar of the Siouan languages. He is best known for his contributions to the preservation of the Kansa language and to the study of Proto-Siouan, the reconstructed last common ancestor of the Western Siouan languages. He has been described as one of the most influential Siouanists, mentoring numerous other linguists in the field; he was made an honorary citizen of the Sioux Nation for his language preservation efforts. Credited with single-handedly preserving the Kansa language, his ashes were given to the Kaw Nation following his death.

After developing an interest in linguistics after hearing foreign languages from Europe and Asia on his ham radio as a child, Rankin began studying Romance linguistics at Emory University. He earned his master's and doctoral degrees at the University of Chicago studying Romanian dialects in the country between 1966 and 1968 after earning a Fulbright Fellowship. After he was encouraged by his colleague at the University of Kansas, he began studying the Siouan languages, namely Quapaw and Kansa; Rankin worked with all three of the last speakers of Kansa and the last speaker of Quapaw, compiling dictionaries and grammars of both. Apart from his work in Siouan linguistics, Rankin also made contributions to historical linguistics, lexicography, and other Native American language families such as Iroquoian and Muskogean.

== Early life and education ==
Robert Louis Rankin was the eldest son born to Harvey W. and Helen E. Rankin in Bellefonte, Pennsylvania, on January 17, 1939. The family moved around from Pennsylvania to New York to Louisiana to Florida, but ultimately settled in Tifton, Georgia, where Rankin spent the majority of his childhood. As a young man, Rankin established the Tifton chapter of the local Ground Observer Corps and was active in his local Boy Scout troop. He developed an interest in languages after toying around with his ham radios and hearing languages from Europe and Asia. In 1956, Rankin graduated from Tifton High School, going on to study Spanish and French at Emory University in Atlanta, graduating in 1960.

After his acceptance at the University of Chicago's graduate school, Rankin was made a Fulbright Fellow and both he and his wife headed to Communist Romania, where they stayed from 1966 until 1968 while he studied the nation's regional dialects. The year of his return, he was granted a master's degree in linguistics. In 1972, he was awarded his doctorate in linguistics from the University of Chicago. His dissertation, which remained focused on his work in Romania, was entitled Word Final High Vowels in Rumanian: Problems in Synchronic and Diachronic Dialectology.

== Career ==
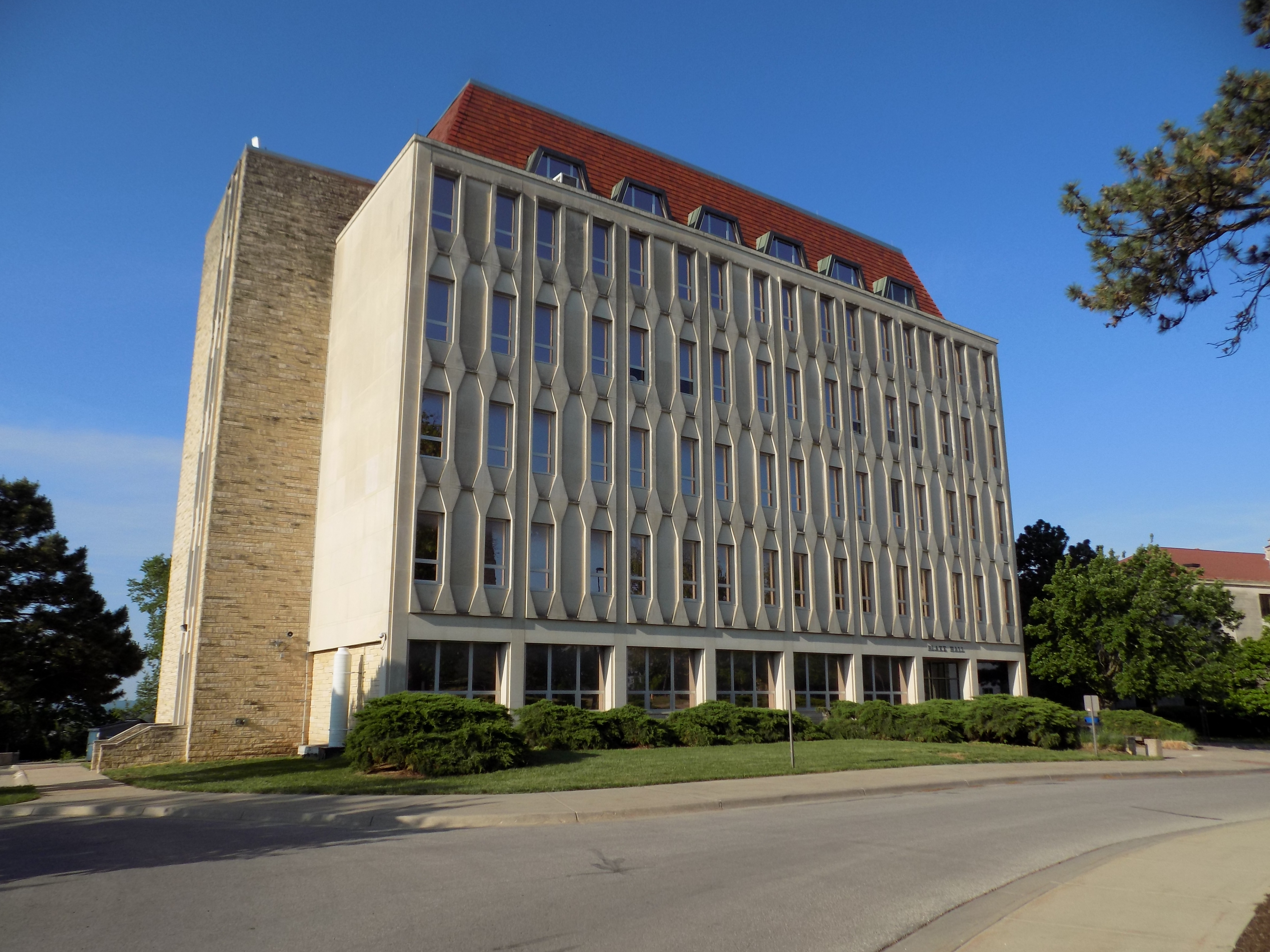
Blake Hall houses the linguistics department at the University of Kansas.

Rankin was hired by the University of Kansas in 1969 as an acting assistant professor of linguistics, largely based on his expertise in European languages. At the urging of his colleague, Dale Nicklas, Rankin began looking into Native American languages in the area; according to Rankin, Nicklas argued that "it was the duty of every American linguist to try to document at least one Native American language".

After failing to find sufficient resources to begin a study of Quapaw, Rankin began work on the Kansa language in the summer of 1973, (Note: Some sources indicate that this began in the summer of 1974. In Linda Cumberland's recorded interview, Rankin recounts that it was "the latter part of the summer of '73".) looking for the last three speakers of the language in Shidler, Oklahoma. One of the speakers, Maude McCauley Rowe, agreed to collaborate, but refused to share stories until the winter time, in accordance with Plains Indian tradition. Instead, Rankin recorded her recitation of the Lord's Prayer. When he returned the next day, he brought with him a transcription and recited it back to her, shocking her. Believing her language to be unable to be written down and doomed to extinction, she requested a photocopy of the transcription which she then disseminated throughout the tribe. Rankin and Rowe then met for two hours every weekday afternoon to record in two-week intervals.

Rankin worked alongside Rowe and the two other speakers, Ralph Pepper and Walter Kekahbah, for three years, taking meticulous notes and recording dozens of hours of speech. He also compared his own notes with those of James Owen Dorsey, an American amateur linguist and missionary who studied the language in the 1880s and 1890s. Although some of Dorsey's notes were written in Latin to avoid contemporary anti-obscenity laws, Rankin could read Latin. While comparing Dorsey's notes to Rowe's interpretations, he once accidentally recited a bawdy story to Rowe after failing to adequately prepare his notes that morning. He later recounted:

She kind of went, "Pff, pff, pff," you know, through her lips, and then she just burst out laughing, laughing as hard as she could. I couldn't figure out what the deal was, and then I looked to see the translation and I saw the Latin – and I can read Latin – and it was, uh, shall we say, very questionable language, really ripe. Raccoon had done something really naughty and then had done it again. And I had read this right out loud to Mrs. Rowe! And if she hadn't had a terrific sense of humor, that probably would have been the end of my fieldwork, right that day.

After being granted a $40,000 ($65,940 in 2025) fellowship by the National Endowment for the Humanities, the project culminated in a dictionary and grammar. Rankin eventually had to stop recording after sustaining a back injury which required surgery; his informants died shortly thereafter, the last speakers of the Kansa language.

Rankin ultimately pursued an interest in the Siouan languages which were spoken nearby, in part because of their endangered status. During his career, Rankin primarily focused on historical phonology of the Siouan languages, namely the Dhegiha subfamily and the Kansa language in particular. He was also an active lexicographer and philologist and published works on the Iroquoian and Muskogean languages as well as more broadly in archeology, typology, and the history of linguistics itself. Rankin later returned to Quapaw, working with its last speaker and later creating a dictionary and grammar as he had with Kansa. His outline of the Ofo language, another Siouan language, corrected massive failures and mistakes of previous literature.

At Kansas University, Rankin was promoted twice, achieving full professorship in 1986. He retired in 2005, though he continued to be involved in academia afterward. His final publication was made in 2012, entitled Kaa^{n}ze Ie Wayaje: An Annotated Dictionary of Kaw (Kanza).

== Death and legacy ==
After a years-long bout of prostate cancer and kidney disease, Rankin died on February 24, 2014, at the age of 75. Following his cremation, his wife called the Kaw Nation to inform them of his death and offer them his ashes. A spokesman for the Kaw, James Pepper Henry, remarked that Rankin had "single-handed[ly] preserved our language" and that "the gift of Mr. Rankin's ashes is a high honor". He was given a memorial headstone, which reads in Kansa: Wíblaha^{n} Ká^{n}ze íe shó^{n}sho^{n} ni ('Thanks to you, the Kansa language lives on'). He was also given the name Kaanze Koya ('Kaw Friend') by the Kaw Nation.

Rankin has been described as a towering figure in Siouan linguistics. In a book posthumously dedicated in his honor, he was described by its editors as "a mentor to nearly all living Siouanists". The Sioux Nation made him an honorary citizen for his contributions to the preservation of their languages. Rankin's recordings of Kansa were given to some members of the tribe; Johnnie Ray McCauley, Rowe's nephew, received copies in 1996 and died a few months later while listening to Rankin's recordings of his aunt speaking the language.

== Personal life ==
Rankin married Carolyn Ann Leverance on September 11, 1965. The two met while they were both students at the University of Chicago and were both later employed as researchers at the University of Kansas. Carolyn was a cellular biologist whose research focused on brain diseases relating to the Parkin protein.

Rankin's interest in ham radios continued throughout his life. The skills he developed later allowed him to serve as a storm spotter for emergency services in Leavenworth County, Kansas.

== Selected works ==
- Rankin, Robert L. (1972). Word Final High Vowels in Rumanian: Problems in Synchronic and Diachronic Dialectology (PhD thesis). University of Chicago.
- —— (1976). "Latin kʷ, gʷ, > Rumanian p, b : An explanation". In Luján, Marta; Hensey, Fritz (eds.). Current Studies in Romance Linguistics. Texas Symposium on Romance Linguistics. Washington, D.C.: Georgetown University Press.
- —— (1977). "From verb to auxiliary to noun classifier and definite article: Grammaticalization of the Siouan verbs 'sit', 'stand', 'lie'". In Brown, R. L.; Houlihan, K.; Hutchinson, L.; MacLeish, A. (eds.). Proceedings of the 1976 Mid-America Linguistics Conference. Mid-America Linguistics Conference. Minneapolis: University of Minnesota.
- —— (1978). Staiano, Anthony; Yavas, Feryal (eds.). "The Unmarking of Quapaw Phonology: A Study of Language Death" (PDF). Kansas Working Papers in Linguistics. 3: 45–52. doi:10.17161/KWPL.1808.723. ISSN 1043-3805.
- —— (1982). "Quapaw Vocabulary". Kansas Working Papers in Linguistics. 7: 125–152. doi:10.17161/KWPL.1808.3622. hdl:1808/3622. ISSN 1043-3805.
- —— (1987). "Ponca, Biloxi, and Hitdatsa glottal stop and Quapaw gemination are historically related accentual phenomena". Proceedings of the 1987 Mid-America Linguistics Conference. Mid-America Linguistics Conference. Lawrence: University of Kansas. pp. 252–262.
- —— (1988). "A Relic of Proto-Siouan *rǫ/nǫ 'one' in Mississippi Valley Siouan". Kansas Working Papers in Linguistics. 13: 122–126. doi:10.17161/KWPL.1808.630. hdl:1808/630. ISSN 1043-3805. (Note: Later republished in a Festschrift for Laurence C. Thompson in 1993 with the following citation information: —— (1993). "A Relic of Proto-Siouan *rǫ 'one' in Mississippi Valley Siouan". In Mattina, Anthony; Montler, Timothy (eds.). American Indian Linguistics and Ethnography: In Honor of Laurence C. Thompson. Missoula: University of Montana Occasional Papers in Linguistics. pp. 471–475. ISBN 9781879763500.)
- —— (1994). "On the source and scope of Siouan aspiration" (PDF). In Gomez de Garcia, Jule; Rood, David S. (eds.). Proceedings of the 1993 Mid-America Linguistics Conference and Conference on Siouan/Caddoan Languages. Mid-America Linguistics Conference and Conference on Siouan/Caddoan Languages. Boulder: University of Colorado. pp. 205–216.
- —— (1996). "Deeper Genetic Relationships in North America: Some Tempered Pessimism". Annual Meeting of the Berkeley Linguistics Society: Special Session on Historical Issues in Native American Languages. 22 (2): 117–128. doi:10.3765/bls.v22i2.1362. ISSN 2377-1666.
- —— (1994). "On the source and scope of Siouan aspiration" (PDF). In Gomez de Garcia, Jule; Rood, David S. (eds.). Proceedings of the 1993 Mid-America Linguistics Conference and Conference on Siouan/Caddoan Languages. Mid-America Linguistics Conference and Conference on Siouan/Caddoan Languages. Boulder: University of Colorado. pp. 205–216.
- —— (1998). Siouan–Catawban–Yuchi genetic relationship with a note on Caddoan. 18th Annual Siouan and Caddoan Languages Conference. Bloomington: Indiana University.
- —— (1999). A diachronic perspective on active/stative alignment in Siouan. 19th Annual Siouan and Caddoan Languages Conference. Regina: University of Regina and Saskatchewan Indian Federated College.
- —— (2001). The Kaw nation in prehistory: What the Kaw language and place names tell us (Speech). Kaw Mission. Council Grove, Kansas.
- —— (2004) [2002]. "The Ofo Language of Louisiana: Philological Recovery of Grammar and Typology". LAVIS III: Language Variety in the South: Historical and Contemporary Perspectives. Southeastern Conference on Linguistics. Tuscaloosa: University of Georgia.
- —— (2004). "The history and development of Siouan positional with special attention to polygrammaticalization in Dhegiha". Sprachtypologie und Universalienforschung. 57 (2–3): 202–227. doi:10.1524/stuf.2004.57.23.202. ISSN 2196-7148.
- —— (2010). The place of Mandan in the Siouan language family. 30th Annual Siouan and Caddoan Languages Conference. Chicago: Northeastern Illinois University.
- —— (2012). Cumberland, Linda (ed.). Kaá^{n}ze Íe Wayáje: An Annotated Dictionary of Kaw (Kanza). Kaw Nation. ISBN 978-0-692-01891-0.
