= Ardina Moore =

Native American artist and designer (1930–2022)

- Mashrugheta
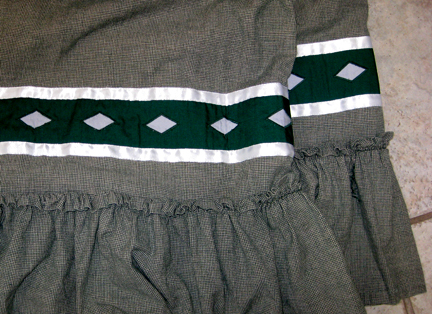
- Rattlesnake ribbonwork design on skirt by Ardina Moore, 1995
- Born: Ardina Revard; December 1, 1930; Belton, Texas, U.S.
- Died: April 19, 2022 (aged 91); Tulsa, Oklahoma, U.S.
- Education: Northeastern State University
- Occupations: Artist, Native American clothing designer
- Known for: Quapaw speaker, textile artist
- Notable work: Quapaw language preservation

Ardina Moore (née Revard, December 1, 1930 – April 19, 2022) was a Quapaw/Osage Native American from Miami, Oklahoma. A Quapaw language speaker, she taught the language to some tribal members.

Moore was a fashion designer and regalia-maker, who founded an Indian apparel business, Buffalo Sun, in Miami, Oklahoma, in 1983. She received numerous awards for her fashion designs, served in multiple leadership positions within the Quapaw Tribe of Indians, and was inducted into the Oklahoma Women's Hall of Fame.

== Early life ==
Ardina Revard was born on December 1, 1930, in Belton, Texas. Her father was James Osage "Jimmie" Revard (Osage), founder of the band the Oklahoma Playboys, and her mother was Martha Dora Griffin (Quapaw), who died when Revard was about seven years old. Her maternal grandparents were Minnie and Chief Victor Griffin, the last Quapaw chief before the tribe formed a business committee. Revard grew up hearing both English and Quapaw on the farm of Chief Griffin known as "Devil's Promenade" in northeastern Oklahoma. After finishing high school, Revard enrolled at Northeastern State University, graduating in 1957.

== Early career ==
Moore began her teaching career, first teaching high school health and physical education. Then she taught American Indian history and genealogy at Northeastern Oklahoma A&M College (NEO) in Miami, Oklahoma. Between 1967 and 1978, she lived in Montana, but returned to Oklahoma with her family and discovered that the Quapaw language was endangered. She joined the Community Service Program, at NEO and began teaching evening language classes to preserve the Quapaw language, creating her own workbooks and tapes, as she had no dictionaries or textbooks on the language.

== Artistic career ==
Moore, who had been making Native American fashions for her daughters to wear at powwows, Indian dances or other functions, began commercially marketing Indian apparel in 1983. The company Buffalo Sun was located in Miami, Oklahoma, where Moore lived and designed the clothing. She also cut patterns which Native women sewed from their homes. The company made inner and outer wear as well as accessories, with traditional and contemporary fashions. Some were simple designs and others feature intricate beadwork and ribbonwork elements. She toured with her fashions throughout Oklahoma, Arkansas, Missouri, and to both coasts, participating in the Powhatan Renape Nation fashion show in Pennsylvania and Los Angeles where fashion shows were held at the American Cultural Center and International Trade Center.

== Language and cultural preservation efforts ==
From her beginning evening classes Moore expanded her program to save the Quapaw language to two series of classes, which span over an eight-week period and were held annually at the Quapaw Tribal Museum. The tribe also holds an annual Youth Language Camp, as well as conferences with the Dhegiha Language Conference to preserve and teach the Quapaw language and its closely related tongues, Osage and Omaha. In addition to her efforts to save the Quapaw language, Moore served as the tribe's powwow committee secretary/treasurer, tribal historian, chair of the tribe's Cultural Committee, and as an elected member of the Tribal Business Committee.

== Awards and honors ==
Moore received many awards and honors over her career. She won first place in the Santa Fe Indian Market fashion show twice, was awarded best in her division at the Eiteljorg Museum's annual Indian Market in Indianapolis, was honored by the Heard Museum of Phoenix in 2003, and was featured in an Oklahoma Educational Television Authority special in 2006. In 2011, she was inducted into the Oklahoma Women's Hall of Fame.

== Death ==
Moore died on April 19, 2022, in Tulsa, Oklahoma, at the age of 91.
