= USS Quapaw =

Tugboat of the United States Navy

Coordinates: 37°54′19″N 122°22′0″W

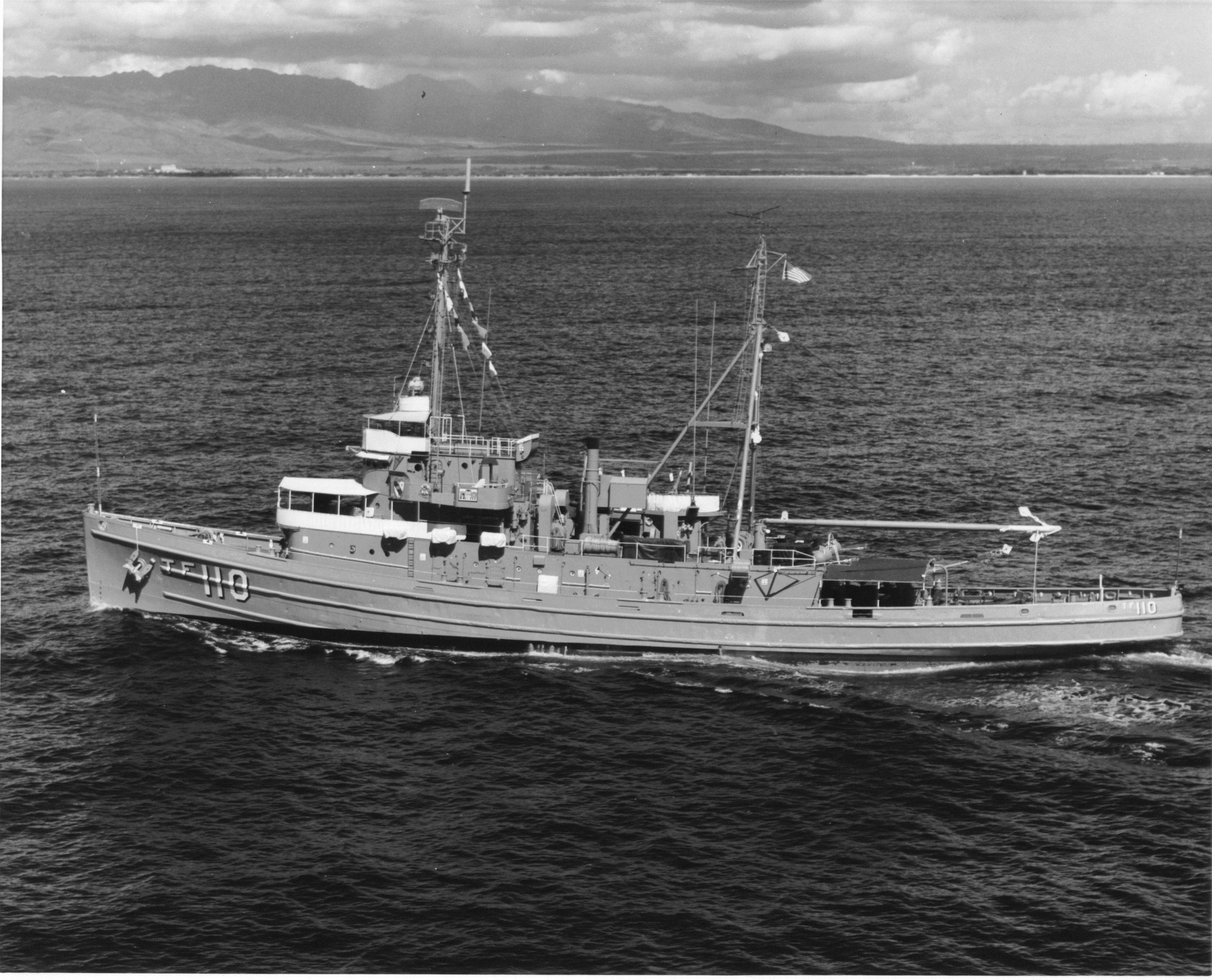

History

United States
- Name: USS Quapaw
- Namesake: Quapaw
- Builder: United Engineering Co.; Alameda, California
- Laid down: 28 December 1942
- Launched: 15 May 1943
- Sponsored by: Mrs. N. Lehman
- Commissioned: 6 May 1944
- Reclassified: ATF–110, 15 May 1944
- Decommissioned: 30 April 1948
- Recommissioned: 5 December 1950
- Decommissioned: 30 August 1985
- Stricken: 28 January 1992
- Home port: 1970: Pearl Harbor
- Honors and awards: 4 battle stars, World War II; 5 battle stars, Korean War; 7 battle stars, Vietnam War
- Fate: Sank as a result of neglect, 11 December 2011; scrapped 2012

General characteristics
- Class & type: Abnaki-class fleet ocean tug
- Displacement: 1,646 tons
- Length: 205 ft (62.48 m)
- Beam: 38 ft 6 in (11.73 m)
- Draft: 15 ft 3 in (4.65 m)
- Speed: 16 knots (30 km/h)
- Complement: 85
- Armament: 1 × 3"/50 caliber gun; 4 × 40 mm AA guns

USS Quapaw (ATF–110/AT-110) was a Abnaki-class fleet ocean tug in the United States Navy. She was named after the Quapaw.

Quapaw was laid down by United Engineering Co., Alameda, California, 28 December 1942; launched 15 May 1943; sponsored by Mrs. N. Lehman; and commissioned 6 May 1944. She was redesignated ATF–110 on 15 May 1944.

== Operational history ==
=== World War II Pacific operations ===
Quapaw steamed for San Francisco after shakedown out of San Pedro and San Diego, California, through 16 June. She departed San Francisco 21 June 1944, en route to the Admiralty Islands. After calling at Honolulu, where she delivered an Army barge, a dump scow, and a derrick, she steamed 12 July via the Ellice Islands and Milne Bay, New Guinea, arriving Manus, Admiralty Islands 14 August.

Following several harbor tow assignments, she departed 17 August with a deck cargo of 7,500 bbls. of aviation gasoline and 49 motor torpedo boat engines, and with a gasoline barge in tow. These she delivered to Mios Woendi Lagoon, whence she steamed to Maffin Bay where she received orders to stand by in preparation for the landings on Morotai Island.

With a convoy of liberty ships, minesweepers, and landing craft, together with screening destroyers, Quapaw entered Morotai Harbor the morning of 16 September 1944. She remained through 1 October, primarily engaged in retracting LSTs from the beach of Pitoe Bay.

==== Supporting Leyte Gulf operations ====
From 20 October 1944 through 1 January 1945, Quapaw was operating in San Pedro Bay in support of the Leyte operation. Her assignments entailed salvage, firefighting, and towing operations.

On 6 December 1944, Quapaw stood by Liberty ship SS Antoine Saugrain after that ship had been torpedoed the previous day.

Landings were made at Lingayen 9 January 1945 and Quapaw was assigned patrol of both attack areas to render all necessary assistance. She retracted landing ships, made repairs and conducted towing operations until 21 February. She then steamed to Mindoro. She departed Mangarin Bay 26 February as a unit of Admiral W. M. Fechteler's task group TG 78.2, en route to Puerto Princesa, Palawan, for initial assaults against that island. En route, Quapaw took LCI-683 in tow when the latter was unable to maintain convoy speed. The landing forces went ashore 28 February and Quapaw retracted landing craft from the beaches east of Puerto Princesa and in the vicinity of the city jetty. She returned to Mangarin Bay, 5 March.

From 8 through 25 March Quapaw participated in salvage and demolition work, and assisted in clearing harbor wreckage, with intervening repair and tow missions at Zamboanga, Mindanao, Philippines. Further salvage, tow, and repair missions preceded overhaul at Hollandia, New Guinea, commencing 29 May. The tug departed 25 June for Espiritu Santo, New Hebrides, from where she steamed 6 July with one section of a battleship drydock in tow for Samar, Philippines. With the end of hostilities she continued towing services between various ports of the Philippines, with frequent service to Manus and back through 28 April 1946.

==== Return to Stateside ====
Quapaw departed Subic Bay for the United States 16 June 1946, arriving San Francisco, California. 14 July. After overhaul at Mare Island Naval Shipyard, the tug continued coastal and trans-Pacific towing operations until 21 December 1947.

She was placed in an inactive status at San Francisco until 30 April 1948 when she was placed out of commission, in reserve.

=== Korean War ===
Quapaw recommissioned 5 December 1950 at Alameda, California. After refresher training out of San Diego through January 1951, she steamed via Bremerton, Washington, with a barracks ship in tow for Pearl Harbor. Arriving 14 February 1951, she commenced operations under Commander Service Force, Pacific.

The fleet tug provided services at Inchon, Korea 30 April – 17 July 1951, and at Wonsan 19 July – 3 August. Towing services at Sasebo and Yokosuka, Japan were interrupted by patrol duty at Wonsan, Korea 26 October – 20 November 1952, and by operation in the areas of Cho Do and Taechong Do, Korea 17 January – 14 February 1953. Quapaw also conducted patrols in Korean waters in March and April 1953.

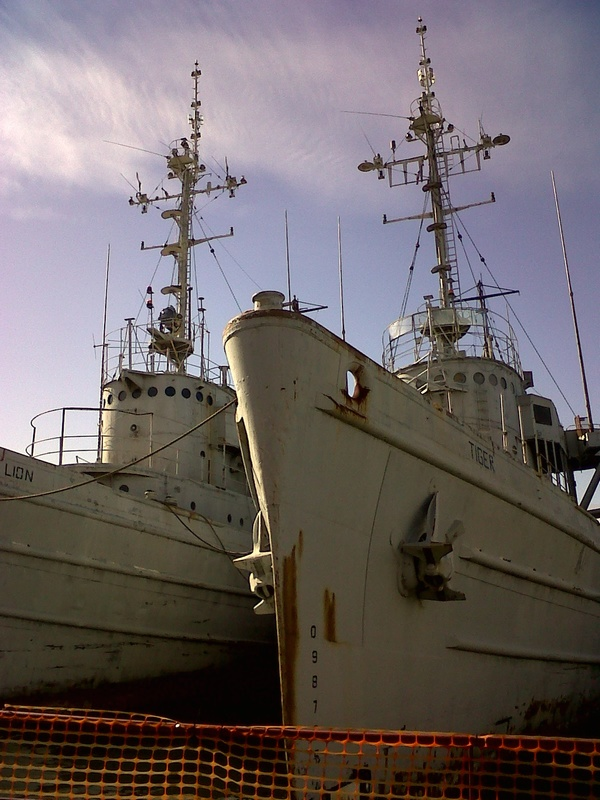
USS Quapaw (Tiger) with USS Moctobi (Lion) at Richmond Shipyards, California in April, 2011

=== Vietnam War and beyond ===
As of 1970, Quapaw continued to provide services to the Fleet out of her homeport of Pearl Harbor. Annual WestPac deployments were interspersed with assignments throughout mid-Pacific areas, as well as by occasional duty as search and rescue vessel out of Adak, Alaska.

During the 1980s until her decommissioning in 1985, Quapaw was home ported at the Port Hueneme Naval CBC in Port Hueneme, California providing salvage, rescue and towing services.

Some post-Vietnam operations/achievements included:

Towing of the USS New Jersey (BB-62) from Puget Sound Naval Shipyard to Long Beach Naval Shipyard prior to her final recommissioning in 1982.

Provided tow escort and support for the towing of USS Missouri (BB-63) from Puget Sound Naval Shipyard to Long Beach Naval Shipyard prior to her final recommissioning in 1984.

Towing of the USS Nautilus (SSN-571) from Mare Island Naval Shipyard to the Panama Canal where the Nautilus was picked up by another tug to be brought to Groton, CT in 1984–85. This set a record for the longest open-ocean tow of a submarine.

USS Quapaw was the first US Navy afloat command to have a female Executive Officer (LTJG Susan Cowan). 1985.

== Decommissioning and sale ==
Following Congressional approval in 1996 for transfer to the Northeast Wisconsin Railroad Transportation Commission, she was handed over on 29 December 1997 to the Ontonagon County Economic Development Corporation on behalf of the Escanaba and Lake Superior Railroad, along with five other obsolete sister tugs. They were intended for a new trans-Lake Superior freight car barge service between Ontonagon and Thunder Bay, Ontario, though it has been suggested that the company sought the tug's four General Motors engines (24 in all) to use in their locomotives. The project was abandoned in October 1999, shortly before title would have passed to the railroad company. Quapaw remained in lay-up between 1997 and 1999.

On 11 December 2011, Quapaw (having been renamed Tiger after being sold to a private interest) sank pierside while being prepared for transfer to a salvage yard for scrapping.

== Honors and awards ==
Quapaw received four battle stars for World War II service, five for the Korean War, and seven for the Vietnam War.

Ribbons, Medals and Awards:
Navy Unit Commendation, Navy Meritorious Unit Commendation, Navy "E" Ribbon, American Campaign Medal, Asiatic–Pacific Campaign Medal (4 stars), World War II Victory Medal, National Defense Service Medal (2 stars), Korean Service Medal (5 stars), Armed Forces Expeditionary Medal (1 star-Korea, 1 star-Op. Frequent Wind), Vietnam Service Medal (7 stars), Humanitarian Service Medal (1 star-Frequent Wind), Philippine Liberation Medal, United Nations Service Medal, Republic of Vietnam Campaign Medal, Republic of Korea War Service Medal (retroactive)

== Legacy ==
In 2006, Quapaw figured in a widely circulated chain e-mail that claimed that a sailor stationed aboard had snapped pictures of the Attack on Pearl Harbor on a Kodak Brownie camera, which remained undiscovered until very recently. In addition to the fact that Quapaw was not launched for another 18 months, the pictures typically circulated with the e-mail were taken from several different locations – and unlikely to have been taken by one individual. Most are well known archival photos from the attack, and all had been previously published.

An anchor and memorabilia from the USS Quapaw is displayed in the Robert Whitebird Cultural Centerin Quapaw, Okla. It is the only part of Quapaw that was preserved by a member of USS Quapaw Association after the ship was dismantled in 2012.
