= Victor Griffin (Quapaw) =

Quapaw leader

William Victor Griffin
- Geh-Hu-He Jinka

Chief of the Quapaw Tribe, Peyote Roadman
- In office 1929–1956/7
- Preceded by: John Quapaw
- Succeeded by: Robert Whitebird

Personal details
- Born: 1873 Indian Territory, modern day Osage County, Oklahoma
- Died: April 10, 1958 (aged 84) Quapaw, Oklahoma
- Spouse(s): Good Eagle, Sarah Lewis, Minnie Track
- Education: Quapaw Indian School
- Profession: Interpreter, peyote roadman, chief
- Known for: last elected Chief of the Quapaw Tribe prior to the creation of the Quapaw Tribal Business Committee; Facilitating the incorporation of the Native American Church under Oklahoma law

Victor Griffin (c. 1873–1958) was the elected chief of Quapaw Tribe of Indians and a peyote roadman from Quapaw, Oklahoma. Griffin was commonly called either Victor or Vic, and rarely used his first name, William. He conferred with every U.S. president during his term as chief.

Griffin also served as an interpreter and also was an important figure among the practitioners of the Big Moon variant of the Native American Church, and played a significant role in the spreading and continuing this religion among multiple tribes. Griffin was also a 32 degree Scottish Right Mason and a member of the Akdar Shrine.

== Early life ==
Victor Griffin was born around 1873 in Indian Territory in what is now Osage County, Oklahoma. Griffin was orphaned at a young age and was raised by his grandmother Mary "Widow" Stafford.

Details about the early life of Griffin are scant and conflicting. Mary Stafford was born prior to the first Quapaw removal, and died at over 100 years of age and was buried on her home allotment. Due to his upbringing with Stafford, Griffin was fluent in the Quapaw language and well versed in tribal oral history. Griffin was given the Quapaw name Geh-Hu-He Jinka.

== Translation and linguistic work ==
Being well educated and well spoken in both English and Quapaw, Griffin frequently served as a translator during meetings or when an elderly Quapaw tribal member needed his services, for example when drafting a will.

He was interviewed by many individuals such as news reporters and researchers. In 1940, linguist Frank T. Siebert interviewed Griffin regarding the Quapaw language; Griffin provided several Quapaw words to Siebert and stated to him "that Quapaw was closely related to Ponca and Omaha, especially to the latter... (you) should study these languages instead".

== Political career ==
After the death of the John Quapaw, the previous tribal chief, Griffin was elected chief on April 3, 1929, defeating Antione Greenback for the office. He served from 1929 to 1957.

During his tenure as chief, he frequently went to Washington D.C. for meetings in the interest of the Quapaw Tribe. It is noted that he met with every President of the United States that served during his time as chief. (Note: These would have included Franklin D. Roosevelt, Harry S. Truman and Dwight D. Eisenhower. It is unclear whether he also met with Herbert Hoover.) Griffin was also noted for being the first "Short-Haired Chief of the Quapaws," because he cut off his braids. He was quoted as saying "formerly our chiefs were chosen by inheritance but now we are elected".

While serving as chief, Griffin was known for colorful displays and often was pictured in tribal regalia, which often included a full Plains eagle-feather headdress. Griffin also featured prominently in the commemorative festivities when paving was completed for Route 66 in Quapaw, Oklahoma on March 24, 1933. The two halves of Route 66 met in the town of Quapaw, leading to the town being referred to in some instances as "where east meets west." Griffin laid a zinc tablet on Main Street to memorialize the event.

In 1956, the Quapaw Tribe, influenced by the Bureau of Indian Affairs, ended their system of governance by chief. They passed a series of governing resolutions that created new form of government by an elected tribal business committee headed by a chairperson. When this took place, Griffin no longer held his position as chief and the political authority of the Quapaw Tribe was vested in the new committee.

== Native American Church involvement ==
John Wilson (Caddo-Delaware), also known as Moonhead, introduced the Peyote religion to the Quapaw people living near present-day Quapaw, Oklahoma, in 1880 or the mid-1890s at the request of Tall Chief. Because Roman Catholic missionaries had influenced Quapaw religion, their practice of peyotism incorporates aspects of Catholicism.

When he visited Quapaw, Moonhead introduced Griffin to peyotism. Griffin was in his teenage years or early twenties. Moonhead instructed Griffin in this religion and authorized him to conduct Native American Church ceremonies. Following John Wilson's death, Griffin became the Native American Church priest to the Quapaw.

Griffin became an ardent believer in the Peyote religion and helped to spread its practice, especially among members of the Osage and Quapaw tribes, but also among other tribal groups such as the Seneca-Cayuga Tribe of Oklahoma.

He also was instrumental in the incorporation of the Native American Church under Oklahoma law in 1911, the incorporation of the religion specified the use of peyote as a sacrament.

== Death and legacy ==
Griffin died at his home residence near the Spring River outside of the town of Quapaw, in Ottawa County, OK, in 1958 at the approximate age of 85. (Note: Griffin's obituary in the Miami, Oklahoma newspaper states that he was 78 years old when he died, indicating he was born about 1880.)

Griffin's image was featured on a brick sculpture between Twelfth and Military Avenue in Baxter Springs, Kansas. The sculpture depicts local history and includes a depiction of Griffin.

Griffin was survived by two sons: Sidney Griffin of Lawton, Oklahoma and Hayes of Wichita, Kansas; two daughters:Mrs. Ardina Buergey and Mrs. Victoria Waters, both of Quapaw; twelve grandchildren and two great-grandchildren. He was a member of the Native American church, and of the Baptist Church at Devil's Promenade.

Some images and heirlooms from the Griffin family are on display at the Robert Whitebird Cultural Center.

== See also ==
- Native American Church
- Quapaw Tribe
- Quapaw, Oklahoma
- Robert Whitebird Cultural Center
