= Kansa language =

Dhegihan language of the Kaw people

Kansa
- Kaáⁿze Íe
- Native to: United States
- Region: Kansas, Oklahoma
- Ethnicity: Kaw people
- Extinct: 1983, with the death of Walter Kekahbah
- Revival: c. 12 L2 speakers (2007)
- Language family: Siouan-Catawban: Siouan; Mississippi Valley; Dhegiha; Kansa–Osage; Kansa

Language codes
- ISO 639-3: ksk
- Glottolog: kans1243
- ELP: Kanza
- Kansa is classified as Extinct by the UNESCO Atlas of the World's Languages in Danger.

- People: Kaáⁿze
- Language: Kaáⁿze Íe
- Country: Mozhóⁿ Kaáⁿze

Kansa (native name: Kaáⁿze Íe), sometimes known as Kaw or Kanza, is a Siouan-Catawban language of the Dhegihan group spoken by the Kaw people of Oklahoma. Vice President Charles Curtis spoke Kansa as a child. The last mother-tongue speaker, Walter Kekahbah, died in 1983.

== Classification ==
Kansa is a Dhegihan language, a broader category containing other languages such as Quapaw, Omaha–Ponca, and Osage. This group of languages is a subset of the Mississippi Valley Siouan languages, which is further of a subset of the Siouan-Catawban languages.

== History ==
The speakers of Kansa, known as the Kaw people, lived together with the Dhegihan language-speakers in a larger nation known as the Dhegihan. This group was originally situated north of the Ohio River and east of the Mississippi River and then moved west down the Ohio River. Following their westward migration, the Dhegihan branched into five indigenous tribes known as Ponca, Osage, Omaha, Quapaw and Kaw people. Later on, many Kaw people migrated west of Missouri river and were called "People of the Southwind." The languages of the five tribes originating from the single Dhegiha group are quite similar, and have been regarded as dialects of each other.

== Geographic distribution ==
The Kansa language was mostly spoken in what is today known as the U.S. state of Kansas. Today it is in the process of revitalization through a thriving tribal language program in Oklahoma near the tribe’s land and through online resources.

== Scholarship and resources ==
Pioneering anthropologist and linguist James Owen Dorsey collected 604 Kansa words in the 1880s and also made about 25,000 entries in a Kansa-English dictionary which has never been published. Dorsey also collected 24 narratives, historical accounts, and personal letters from nine Kansa speakers.

In 1974, linguist Robert L. Rankin met Walter Kekahbah (d. 1983), Ralph Pepper (d. 1982), and Maud McCauley Rowe (d. 1978), the last surviving native speakers of Kansa. Rankin made extensive recordings of all three, especially Rowe, and his work over the next 31 years documented the language and helped the Kaw Nation to develop language learning materials.

== Language revitalization ==
Kansa has no native speakers. Members of the tribe now use English, while some still understand certain Kansa phrases and words. As part of a broader trend toward Native language revitalization efforts, the Kaw Nation offers online language learning for Kansa second language speakers (as of 2012).

The 2nd Annual Dhegiha Gathering in 2012 brought Kansa, Quapaw, Osage, Omaha and Ponca speakers together to share best practices in language revitalization.

== Phonology ==
Kansa has 29 consonants and 8 vowels.

Consonants
		Bilabial	Dental	Alveolar	Post- alveolar	Palatal	Velar	Glottal
Plosive/ Affricate	voiced	b	d		dʒ		ɡ	
Plosive/ Affricate	tense	pː	tː		tʃː		kː	
Plosive/ Affricate	aspirated	pʰ	tʰ		tʃʰ		kʰ	
Plosive/ Affricate	glottalized	pʼ	tʼ	tsʼ			kʼ	ʔ
Fricative	voiceless			s	ʃ		x	h
Fricative	voiced			z	ʒ		ɣ	
Nasal		m		n				
Approximant		w		l		j		

Vowels
	Front		Back
Close	i ĩ	y	
Mid	ɛ		o õ
Open	a ã		

/ɛ/ is phonetically open-mid, whereas /o/ is phonetically close-mid. Additionally, /a/ and /o/ can also be pronounced as [ə] and [u] respectively.

== Orthography ==
Kansa alphabet
Upper case	Lower case	Pronunciation	Example	
Upper case	Lower case	Pronunciation	Kansa	English translation
A	a	/a/	a	arm
Aⁿ	aⁿ	/ã/	aⁿhá	yes (female speaker)
B	b	/b/	ble	I go
Č	č	/tʃː/	česká	cow
Čh (Note: ⟨Č⟩ may be written as ⟨C⟩ when ⟨Č⟩ cannot be written easily.)	čh	/tʃʰ/	čhiⁿ	strike
D	d	/d/	dómbe	look at
E	e	/ɛ/	égo	like, as
G	g	/g/	gáxe	make
H	h	/h/	ho	fish
I	i	/i/	itá	egg
Iⁿ (Note: ⟨ⁿ⟩ is written as ⟨n⟩ before ⟨g⟩, ⟨k⟩, ⟨kh⟩ or ⟨k’⟩, and ⟨m⟩ before ⟨b⟩, ⟨p⟩, ⟨ph⟩ or ⟨p’⟩. In written communications where ⟨ⁿ⟩ cannot be written ⟨~⟩ or ⟨N⟩ are used instead.)	iⁿ	/ĩ/	ìⁿtánga	gravel
J	j	/dʒ/	je	lake
K	k	/kː/	ke	turtle
Kh	kh	/kʰ/	khága	third son
K'	k'	/kʼ/	k’óse	dice
L	l	/l/	léze	striped
M	m	/m/	miⁿ	blanket
N	n	/n/	ni	water
O	o	/o/	obáhaⁿ	wear
Oⁿ	oⁿ	/õ/	oⁿháⁿ	boiling
P	p	/pː/	pa	nose
Ph	ph	/pʰ/	phóke	thud
P'	p'	/pʼ/	yup’íⁿze	blink
S	s	/s/	sábe	black
Sh	sh	/ʃ/	shábe	brown
T	t	/tː/	ta	deer
T'	t'	/tʼ/	t’óxa	bent
Ts'	ts'	/tsʼ/	ts'e	dead
U	u	/y/	úbe	bird's tail
W	w	/w/	wahú	bone
X	x	/x/	xlexlé	tattoo
Y	y	/j/	yéba	jaw
Z	z	/z/	zíhi	yellow
Zh	zh	/ʒ/	zhúje	red
Ɣ	ɣ	/ɣ/	ɣagé	cry
’	’	/ʔ/	’oⁿ	use

== Grammar ==
=== Nouns ===
Kansa does not mark nouns for number or gender. The number of a particular noun can be determined from the verb, an article or from context. For example, the word sínga could be translated to English as "squirrel" or "squirrels" depending on context, in the sentence Sínga miⁿ aⁿdómbabe, (transl. We looked at a squirrel), it must be a single squirrel because of the article miⁿ.

=== Verbs ===
Kansa is a SOV language and the verbs are inflected based on the person and number of their subjects and objects. For example, in the sentence ni kóⁿbla (transl. I want water), the object ni, (transl. water), comes before the verb kóⁿbla (transl. I want).

Kansa does not have verb tenses.

== Vocabulary ==
Kansa has a great deal of vocabulary in common with the other languages of the Dhegiha Siouan group. The following table compares cognates in Kansa and Osage:

English	Osage	Kansa
house	hcí	či
man	níhka	níka
woman	wak'ó	wak'ó
