= Quapaw language =

Language of the Quapaw people

Quapaw
- Ogáxpa
- Pronunciation: [oˈkaxpa]
- Native to: United States
- Region: Arkansas, Oklahoma
- Ethnicity: 160 Quapaw (2000 census)
- Extinct: April 19, 2022, with the death of Ardina Moore
- Language family: Siouan-Catawban: Siouan proper; Mississippi Valley; Dhegiha; Quapaw

Language codes
- ISO 639-3: qua
- Glottolog: quap1242
- ELP: Quapaw
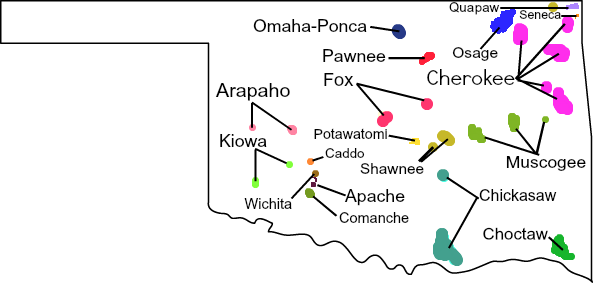
- Map showing the distribution of Oklahoma Indian languages

The Quapaw language (Ogáxpa, Okáxpa [oˈkaxpa]), also known as Arkansas, is a Siouan-Catawban language of the Quapaw people, originally from a region in present-day Arkansas. Later it was spoken in Oklahoma. It is similar to the other Dhegihan languages: Kansa, Omaha, Osage and Ponca.

== Documentation ==
The Quapaw language is well-documented in field notes and publications from many individuals including by George Izard in 1827, by Lewis F. Hadly in 1882, from 19th-century linguist James Owen Dorsey, in 1940 by Frank Thomas Siebert, and, in the 1970s by linguist Robert Rankin.

The Quapaw language does not conform well to English language phonetics, and a writing system for the language has not been formally adopted. All of the existing source material on the language utilizes different writing systems, making reading and understanding the language difficult for the novice learner. To address this issue, an online dictionary of the Quapaw language is being compiled which incorporates all of the existing source material known to exist into one document using a version of the International Phonetic Alphabet which has been adapted for Siouan-Catawban languages.

== Revitalization ==
Ardina Moore taught Quapaw language classes through the tribe.

An online audio lexicon of the Quapaw language is available on the tribal website to assist language learners. The lexicon incorporates audio of first language speakers who were born between 1870 and 1918.

The Quapaw Nation Language Program is housed in the Robert Whitebird Cultural Center in Quapaw, Oklahoma. The program creates curriculum and holds language classes.

The 2nd Annual Dhegiha Gathering in 2012 brought Quapaw, Osage, Kaw, Ponca, and Omaha speakers together to share best practices in language revitalization. A Quapaw Tribal Youth Language and Cultural Preservation Camp taught the language to children.

In 2024, the Quapaw Nation Culture Division created a permanent language department which hired language staff, restarted Quapaw language community classes, and is working towards increased language services.

== Phonology ==
=== Consonants ===
Siebert found 23 consonants in his limited research, while Rankin found 26. When compared with Rankin, Siebert does not include /b/, /d/, or /ʔ/. He also puts the velar plosives and postalveolar fricatives together in a palatal column. The following chart uses Rankin's analysis.

Quapaw Consonants
		Bilabial	Dental	Alveolar	Postalveolar	Velar	Glottal
Plosive	voiceless	p pː	t tː			k kː	ʔ
Plosive	aspirated	pʰ	tʰ			kʰ	
Plosive	glottalized		tʼ			kʼ	
Plosive	voiced	b	d				
Fricative	voiceless			s	ʃ	x	h
Fricative	glottalized			sʼ	ʃʼ	xʼ	
Fricative	voiced			z	ʒ		
Nasal		m		n			
Approximant		w					

=== Vowels ===
In addition to the vowels Rankin found in the below chart, Siebert included four long oral vowels /aː/, /eː/, /iː/, and /oː/.

Quapaw Vowels
	Front	Central	Back
Close	i ĩ		
Mid	e		o õ
Open		a ã	
