= Crow language =

Siouan language in Montana

Crow
- Apsáalooke aliláau
- Pronunciation: [ə̀ˈpsâːɾòːɡè] [ə̀ˈpsâːlòːɡè]
- Native to: United States
- Region: Montana
- Ethnicity: 8,500 Crow Tribe (2007)
- Native speakers: 3,650 (2021)
- Language family: Siouan: Western Siouan; Missouri River; Crow
- Signed forms: Hand Talk

Language codes
- ISO 639-3: cro
- Glottolog: crow1244
- ELP: Crow
- Linguasphere: 64-AAA-b
- Crow is classified as Definitely Endangered by the UNESCO Atlas of the World's Languages in Danger.

Apsáalooke "children of the large beaked bird"
- People: Apsáalooke
- Language: Apsáalooke aliláau Baapáattuua
- Country: Apsáalooke Isawúua

A Crow speaker

Crow (native name: Apsáalooke [ə̀ˈpsâːɾòːɡè] or [ə̀ˈpsâːlòːɡè]) is a Western Siouan language spoken primarily by the Crow Tribe in present-day southeastern Montana. The word Apsáalooke translates to "Children of the Large Beaked Bird" (from apá 'beak/nose', isáa 'big', dooká 'child'), which was later incorrectly translated into English as 'Crow'. It is one of the larger populations of American Indian languages with around 3,650 speakers according to the 2017-2021 American Community Survey.

== Dialects ==
Crow is closely related to Hidatsa spoken by the Hidatsa tribe of the Dakotas; the two languages are the only members of the Missouri Valley Siouan family. Despite their similarities, Crow and Hidatsa are not mutually intelligible.

The Crow people historically constituted two main groups: the River Crow and the Mountain Crow. However, most authors report that dialectal differences between the two groups are few.

== Status ==
According to Ethnologue with figures from 1998, 77% of Crow people over 66 years old speak the language; "some" parents and older adults, "few" high school students and "no pre-schoolers" speak Crow. 80% of the Crow Tribe prefers to speak in English. The language was classified as "definitely endangered" by UNESCO as of 2012.

However, R. Graczyk claims in his A Grammar of Crow (2007) that "unlike many other native languages of North America in general, and the northern plain in particular, the Crow language still exhibits considerable vitality: there are fluent speakers of all ages, and at least some children are still acquiring Crow as their first language." Many of the younger population who do not speak Crow are able to understand it. Almost all of those who do speak Crow are also bilingual in English. Graczyk cites the reservation community as the reason for both the high level of bilingual Crow-English speakers and the continued use and prevalence of the Crow language. Daily contact with non–American Indians on the reservation for over one hundred years has led to high usage of English. Traditional culture within the community, however, has preserved the language via religious ceremonies and the traditional clan system.

Currently, most speakers of Crow are 30 and older but a few younger speakers are learning it. There are increased efforts for children to learn Crow as their first language and many do on the Crow Reservation of Montana, particularly through a Crow language immersion school that was sponsored in 2012. Development for the language includes a Crow language dictionary and portions of the Bible published from 1980–2007. The current literacy rate is around 1–5% for first language speakers and 75–100% for second language learners. Teens are immersed in Crow at the Apsaalooke language camp sponsored by the Crow Tribe.

== Classification ==
Crow is closely related to Hidatsa spoken by the Hidatsa tribe of the Dakotas; the two languages are the only members of the Missouri Valley Siouan family. The ancestor of Crow-Hidatsa may have constituted the initial split from Proto-Siouan-Catawban. Crow and Hidatsa are not mutually intelligible, however the two languages share many phonological features, cognates and have similar morphologies and syntax. The split between Crow and Hidatsa may have occurred between 300 and 800 years ago.

== Phonology ==
=== Vowels ===
There are eight distinct vowels in Crow, three short and five long, along with two diphthongs. The mid vowels [eː] and [oː] do not have phonemic short counterparts, but they may be phonetically shortened preceding a coda consonant.

	Short		Long	
	Front	Back	Front	Back
Close	i	u	iː	uː
Mid	a ~ ə		eː	oː
Open	a ~ ə		aː	
Diphthong			iːə̯	uːə̯

There is also a marginal diphthong ea [eːə̯] that only occurs in two native Crow stems: déaxa 'clear' and béaxa 'intermittent'.

=== Consonants ===
Crow has a relatively small consonant inventory, like many other languages in the Plains Linguistic Area.

	Labial	Alveolar	Palatal	Velar	Glottal
Plosive	p	t	tʃ ⟨ch⟩	k~g	(ʔ) ⟨?⟩
Fricative		s	ʃ ⟨sh⟩	x	h
Sonorant	m~b~w	n~d~ɾ~l			

Stops are aspirated word-initially, word-finally, when geminated (e.g. [ppʰ]) and when following another stop (e.g. [ptʰ]). Stops in a consonant cluster with h as the initial radical (hp, ht, hk) are unaspirated and lax. Gemination in stops only occurs intervocalically. Intervocalic single, nongeminate stops are lax, unaspirated, and generally voiced. The difference between voiced stops b and d (allophones of m and n) and voiceless stops is hardly discernible when following a fricative, since both are unaspirated and lax. The phoneme k has a palatalized allophone [kʲ] that occurs after i, e, ch and sh, often word-finally.

Fricatives are tense; they are only lax when intervocalic. Palatal sh is often voiced intervocalically; s is sometimes voiced intervocalically; x is never voiced. The alveolar fricative /s/ has an optional allophone /h/ in phrase-initial position:

- sáapa "what" > [hâːpa]
- sapée "who" > [hapêː]

Sonorants voiced /m/ and /n/ have three allophones: w and l intervocalically, b and d word initially and following an obstruent, and m and n in all other conditions. In conservative speech, l is realized as a tapped r, however in general cases it is realized as l, perhaps due in part to the influence of English. Word initially, b is optional for /m/, though b is more commonly realized. The glottal sonorant /h/ assimilates to the nasality of the following segment, but retains its voicelessness. When following i or e or preceding ch, /h/ may be realized as an alveopalatal fricative.

The glottal stop is a defective [sic] phoneme that occurs only as the marker of interrogatives, written ⟨?⟩.

- dútchi? [dút͡ʃːiʔ] 'did you get it?'
- shóossdalee? [ʃôːʃdaleːʔ] 'where are you going?'

In fast speech it is often omitted.

=== Structure ===
Vowel sequences across morpheme boundaries can be quite varied, but short vowels cannot appear alone in the morpheme: V:V (long+short), V:V: (long+long) and diphthong+V (short). Word finally, only a (in a diphthong), o, and u (allomorphs of the plural suffix) can occur after a long vowel.

A wide variety of consonant clusters can occur in Crow. All consonants except for /h/ can be geminated. Voiced labials and dentals (phonemic m and n, allophones b, m, w and d, n, l) are resistant to clustering. Because they only occur intervocalically, l and w do not occur in clusters. The plosive allophones b and d only occur in clusters as the second consonant and only at morpheme boundaries. The nasal allophones m and n can only occur with each other with the exception of nm, which often assimilates to mm, or occur with h at a morpheme boundary. Clusters in general most often occur at morpheme boundaries.

Some morphemic constraints:

- A word begins either with a V (long or short) or a single C; no word-initial consonant clusters occur.
- Consonant clusters only occur word-internally. One exception is the morpheme sht, an emphatic sentence-final declarative marker.
- A word can end in any C except for p and x; word-final ch only occurs in one word, íach, a plural demonstrative.
- All lexical nouns and verb stems end in a vowel.
- Generally, nonderived noun and verb stems consist of between 1–4 syllables.
- Only long vowels or diphthongs occur in one-syllable words.

=== Accent ===
Crow has a phonemic pitch-accent system, not unlike what is seen in Tokyo Japanese. The position of the accent in the stem is determined lexically and can serve to distinguish between minimal pairs. Virtually all noun and verb stems have an inherent accent. In word initial syllables, accented short vowels are generally followed by a consonant cluster, while accented long vowels are generally followed by a single consonant. Accent can fall on short vowels as well as long vowels and may fall on either mora of a long vowel. With diphthongs, either the high vowel or the schwa offglide may bear the accent.

Accent helps predict the tones of all the vowels in a word: accented vowels are high in pitch; all vowels following the accented vowel are low in pitch; all short vowels preceding the accented vowel are low in pitch; all long vowels preceding the accented vowel are high in pitch; short vowels occurring between a long vowel and the accented vowel assimilate to a high pitch. In other words, all vowels between the accented vowel and the first long vowel in the word (if there is one) are high in pitch, forming what has been described as a high pitch plateau.

In words composed of more than one morpheme, there are several rules (with a few exceptions) to determine the placement of the accent:

- If the first accented morpheme is accented anywhere except for the final mora of a stem-final vowel, the subsequent morpheme is unaccented.
  - e.g., íaxchi 'reins' + úuwata 'metal' = íaxchuuwata 'bridle'
- If the first accented morpheme has its accent on the stem-final vowel mora, that morpheme loses its accent.
  - e.g., bilí 'water' + chikúa 'sweet' = bilichikúa 'soda'
- If the morpheme following the first accent lacks lexical accent, the accent remains on the first morpheme.
  - e.g., kootá 'like that' + ssaa 'not' = kootássaa 'not be like that'
- If an accented stem-final vowel is deleted when the following morpheme lacks lexical accent, the accent is transferred to the vowel mora that precedes the deleted vowel.
  - e.g., iisá 'face' + xii 'move in a direction' = iísxii 'move forward'

Exceptions:

- A few stems with final falling accent have long high accent for the purposes of word formation.
- The punctual aspectual marker áhi overrides the regular word accent – it is always accented
- The exclamative sentence-final marker wík is accented in addition to the accent of the stem to which it is combined. Vowel morae that occur between the first accent and the exclamative suffix are low in pitch.

=== Phonological processes ===
Phonological processes in Crow include:

- short vowel deletion: stem-final short vowels are deleted at a morpheme boundary unless a three-consonant cluster or a nasal plus voiceless obstruent would occur. Stem-final vowels do not delete before dak, the coordinate noun-phrase conjunction. Sentence-final evidential suffixes also do not cause the final short vowel to be deleted.
- nasal assimilation: n assimilates to m in a cluster; nm clusters do not occur.
- sibilant assimilation: alveolar s and ss are realized as [ʃ] at morpheme boundaries before all consonants except x and s.
- vowel neutralization: word-finally, stem-final short vowels i, a and u are neutralized to their corresponding mid nonround or round vowel: i, a become e; u becomes o.
- identical vowel reduction: with suffixes beginning with a, sequences of 3-4 identical vowel morae are reduced to two (aa-a and aa-aa are reduced to aa); exceptions are compounds and prefixes.
- long vowel reduction before h: long vowels shorten before h in a syllable coda.
- final schwa deletion: the final schwa of a diphthong is deleted before suffixes beginning with a and before the plural; before other vowels, it is otherwise retained.
- palatal-dental alternation: stem-final ch and t are complementary; t occurs before a-initial suffixes and plural u, and ch everywhere else. This relations holds parallel for sh and s; and the geminates tch [tːʃ] and ssh [ʃː]. The ch and sh forms occur before nonlow vowels, whereas t and s occur before low vowels. There are, however, a few exceptions to this complementary relationship, therefore these phonemes cannot be considered as allophones.
- palatal-velar alternation: there is a lexically conditioned ch to k alternation; k occurs before the plural and before suffixes beginning with a, not producing t.
- stem ablaut: lexically conditioned alternation affecting stem-final long vowels triggered by the plural morphemes, the imperative, and a-initial suffixes, e.g., ii to aa ablaut; ee to ii ablaut; ee to aa ablaut.

== Orthography ==
The following tables summarize the correspondences between the phonemic representation of consonants and their representation in the orthography, omitting the complications involving underlying forms.

Consonants
Phoneme	Written
t͡ʃ	ch
t͡ʃː	tch
ʃ	sh
ʃː	ssh
ʃt͡ʃ	sch
m	m, b, w
n	n, d, l
ʔ	?

Vowels
Phoneme	Written
aː	aa
eː	ee
iː	ii
oː	oo
uː	uu
eːə̯	ea
iːə̯	ia
uːə̯	ua

An accent mark on the first grapheme of a long vowel or diphthong (e.g. áa, ía) indicates falling pitch /âː îːə̯/, while an accent on the final grapheme (e.g. aá, iá) marks high pitch /áː íːə̯/.

== Morphology ==
Crow is a polysynthetic language.

=== Nominal morphology ===
Basic stems consist of one to four syllables (with four being rare) and always end in a vowel. Monosyllabic stems have long vowels or diphthongs, e.g., bií, 'stone, rock'; bía, 'woman'. The vast majority of nouns in Crow are derived stems. Derivational processes in nominal morphology include affixation and compounding.

==== Suffixes ====
A non-exhaustive list of nominal suffixes:

- aachí/lichí – 'approximative': aachí follows a stem-final short vowel, lichí follows a stem-final long vowel. Marks resemblance or similarity: 'kind of, sort of, like, (temporal) around the time of.'
- kaáshi – 'real, true; very'
- káata – 'diminutive': Can add the diminutive meaning 'small, little' or the endearing, affectionate meaning 'dear' according to the semantics of the noun.
- kíishi – 'sportive, imitative': Marks resemblance or imitation.
- táa(hi)li – 'real, genuine': Marks an object's reality, its genuineness. Often reduced to táali.
- ahi – 'here and there': Most commonly occurs with verbs, though occasionally is attached to nouns.
- ht(aa) – 'even': Marks concessive subordinate clauses as 'although, even though, even if.' Also occurs as a noun suffix glossed as 'even.' Htaa is a rare suffix that combines with the bare nominal stem of the noun.

==== Prefixes ====
Some prefixes will render a relative clause into a derived noun.

- ak – 'agent nominalizer': creates agentive nouns (ex. 'singer', 'dancer') from active verbs or verbs plus incorporated objects.
- ala – 'locative, temporal, or manner nominalizer': 'where, when, how' derived from verbs or verbs plus incorporated nouns. In some cases, ala may follow the noun creating a lexicalized relative clause.
- baa – 'indefinite nominalizer': Derived from stative verbs, inalienably possessed nouns plus stative verbs, active transitive verbs, and from active intransitive verbs.
- ii – 'instrumental nominalizer': Derived from active transitive and intransitive verbs, and from transitive verbs plus incorporated nouns.
- bale – 'depossessivizer': Allows an inalienably possessed noun to occur without a possessor.

==== Compounding ====
There are two basic types of compounding in Crow: noun-noun compounds and noun-verb compounds.

Noun-noun compounds often involve a whole-part relationship: the first noun refers to the whole and the second to the part. Members of the compound may also be themselves compounds or derived nouns.

íi + bilí = íi-wili
mouth + water = saliva

áali + ísshi = áal-isshi
arm + container = sleeve

Noun-verb compounds consist of a noun plus a stative verb. There are a number of select exceptions.

==== Possession ====
Nouns are classified as either inalienably or alienably possessed, according to which possessive markers they occur with.

Inalienably possessed nouns are those that are inherently possessed or nondetachable associations, specifically body parts and family members, opposed to alienably possessed nouns whose entity is not inherently possessed. This rule is not absolute as some body parts and kin nouns can be considered alienable and some nouns with close associations to its possessor (i.e., aasúu 'his house', isaashkakaáshi 'her dog') can be considered inalienable.

The affixed possession paradigm for inalienable and alienable possessives can be derived. The alienable possessives only use the first consonant of the alienable prefixes and do not mark the possessor when the prefix begins with a vowel. The final suffix transforms into a diphthong from /-o/.

	Alienable		Inalienable	
	Singular	Plural	Singular	Plural
1st Person	bas-{root}	bas-{root}-o	b-{root}	b-{root}-úua
2nd Person	dís-{root}	dís-{root}-o	d-{root}	d-{root}-uua
3rd Person	is-{root}	is-{root}-o	0-{root}	0-{root}-úua

==== Personal names ====
Personal names constitute a distinct morphological class of nouns in Crow. They are marked with the definite determiner suffix sh, which attaches to the stem rather than to the citation form.

==== Pronouns ====
Crow has three pronominal forms: bound; emphatic and contrastive; and interrogative-indefinite pronouns. With the first two types, there is a correlation between morphology and syntax. Argument pronouns are generally bound whereas emphatic and contrastive pronouns are generally independent. Bound pronominals function as direct and oblique arguments.

- A-set pronominals mark only subjects of active verbs, both transitive and intransitive.
- B-set pronominals mark subjects of stative verbs, direct objects, and objects of postpositions.

Bound Pronominal Stems:

	A-Set		B-Set	
	Singular	Plural	Singular	Plural
1st Person	baa	baa+PL	bii	balee
2nd Person	dá(a)	dá(a)+PL	dii	dii+PL
3rd Person	0	0+PL	0	0+PL

=== Verbal morphology ===
Verbal derivational morphology is composed of prefixes, suffixes, one infix (chi, 'again; possessive reflexive') and reduplication, which expresses an "iterative, distributive, or intensive sense to the meaning of the stem."

==== Active–stative verbs ====
The morphological verb classes in Crow mirror a semantic distinction: Crow is an active–stative language, meaning that the subject of an active verb is treated differently than the subject of a stative verb. Active verbs and stative verbs are marked with distinct sets of pronominal affixes: the "A-set" for active verbs and the "B-set" for stative verbs.

Active verbs may have one, two, or three arguments (making them respectively intransitive, transitive, or ditransitive). An intransitive verb takes a subject (SV), a transitive verb takes a subject and an object (SOV) and a ditransitive verb takes a subject and two objects (SO_{1}O_{2}V). In a relative clause built on an active verb, when the subject of the verb is the head of the relative clause and it is an animate noun phrase, it is marked by ak.

Stative verbs may have zero (impersonal), one, or two arguments. In a relative clause, the subject of a stative verb is marked with m or in elevated discourse, dak. There may also be an absence of marking on the head noun where the entire relative clause is marked with the indefinite nonspecific determiner m.

==== Verb chain ====
Crow has a fairly complex ordering of verb phrase constituents. The following table demonstrates simple constructions of active-state intransitive and transitive verbs based on the first person.

	1	2	3	4	5	6	7	8	9	10	11
	Indirect object	Indirect Object No.	Direct object	Subject: Transitive verb	Subject: Intransitive verb	Subject No.	Verb Stem	Subject: Transitive Causative	Causative	Subject No.	Mood
	B-Set Pronominals		A-Set Pronominals								
1					baa		Active Intransitive			Singular-Plural	Mood
2			bii			Singular-Plural	Active Intransitive	[b]	aa	Singular-Plural	Mood
3			bii	baa		Singular-Plural	Active Transitive			Singular-Plural	Mood
4	bii	Singular-Plural	bii			Singular-Plural	Active Transitive	wa	hc	Singular-Plural	Mood
5					bii		Stative Intransitive			Singular-Plural	Mood
6			bii			Singular-Plural	Stative Intransitive			Singular-Plural	Mood

- 1-4) Active ("A-Set") pronominals in Crow are very diverse coming in many different forms based on the based bound form. They are patterned by a certain list of lexical and phonological factors, such as the dú(u) – by hand pattern which results in a 1sg bu and a 2sg di, or the dá(a) – by mouth pattern which results in a 1sg ba and a 2sg da.
- 2) For Active-Intransitive Causative Verbs, 1-2 person singular causative (rank 10) is marked by aa as in chart, 1-2 person plural is marked by uu, 3rd person singular is marked by ee or a determined lexically, and 3rd person plural is marked by either uu, o, or iio determined lexically.
- 4) For Active-Transitive Causative Verbs, the causative transitive verb subject is marked by wa in the first person, la in the second person and 0 in the third person. The Causative affixes are hc (singular) and hk (plural).
- Mood in Crow is expressed by a variety of postpositionals. The standard indicative morpheme is k.

The verb chain constituents are, of course, much more complicated. Following is a concise list of the rank ordering of each type element:

- Prefixes:
  - I: Adverbial proclitics:
  - II: B-set pronominal elements
  - III: A-set pronominal elements
  - IV: Locative prefixes
  - V: Instrumental prefixes
- Stem:
  - VI: Stem modification – reduplication or prefixation and infixation of chi/ku "again"
- Suffixes
  - VII: Derivational suffixes
  - VIII: Punctual áhi
  - IX: Continuative, modal, or benefactive auxiliary
  - X: Habitual i
  - XI: Plural
  - XII: Subordinate clause markers
    - a. Speech act and evidential markers
    - b. Switch reference markers
    - c. Subordinate clause markers
    - d. Clauses without final markers
  - XIII: Negative ssaa

== Syntax ==
Crow is a subject–object–verb (SOV) language; it is a verb-final and head marking. In noun phrases, the order is possessor–possessum, with the person marker of the possessor identified by a prefix to the possessum. Subordinate clauses precede matrix clauses, and are marked by a suffixed clause-final marker. Relative clauses are internally headed. Crow has postpositional phrases, with the postposition often occurring as a prefix to the following verb. There is no distinct category of adjectives; instead, stative verbs function as noun phrase modifiers.

Crow is an active–stative language, with verbs divided into two classes, active (both transitive and intransitive) and stative, largely on semantic grounds. This is also often called a "split intransitive" language.

=== Noun-phrase syntax ===
An analysis of Crow noun phrase syntax under generative grammar has yielded the following rules:

1. NP → N' (DET)
  1. N' → N
  2. N' → [s...N' head...] (relative clause)
  3. N' → NP N' (genitive/possessive)
  4. N' → PP N' (PP modifier)
2. Q → DP Q (quantifier phrase)
3. DP → DEM NP (demonstrative phrase)
4. NP → NP NP (appositive)
5. NP → S (COMP) (nominalization)
  1. NP → (NP CONJ)^n (coordinate NP with dak)
  2. NP → (N' CONJ)^n DET (coordinate N' with xxo)

There are two phrases that are subordinate to the NP (noun-phrase): (1) the DP (demonstrative phrase) and (2) the QP (quantifier phrase).

A noun phrase can be marked as definite or indefinite by a suffixed determiner (DET). The definite suffix is /-sh/ and the indefinite suffix is /-m/.

  - iisáakshee-sh (definite)
    - 'the young man'
  - bía-m (indefinite)
    - 'a woman'

The determiner suffix is attached to the final word of the noun phrase, not just the agentive noun.

[[bíakaate shoop-úu]-m húulee-sh aw-ákee]-sh
girl four-PL-DET yesterday-DET 1A-see-DET
'the four girls I saw yesterday'

Relative Clauses: N' → [s...N' head...]

[iisáakshi-m búupchee-sh ak-ataalée]-sh aw-ákaa-k
young.man-DET ball-DET REL-steal-DET 1A-see-DECL
'I saw the young man who stole the ball'

Genitive Clauses: N' → NP N'

[Clara-sh [is-íilaalee]] sapéen ataalí-?
Clara-DET 3POS-car who steal-INTERR
'who stole Clara's car?'

Postpositional Phrases: N' → PP N'

[[dii-héel-uua] ham]-dappií-o-lahtaa
2B-among-PL some-kill-PL-even.if
'even if they kill some of you'

Quantifier Phrases: Q → DP Q There are two classes of quantifiers that are distinguished syntactically. The first class heads a quantifier phrases that takes a demonstrative (or in its stead, a noun phrase) as its complement: xaxúa.

hinne bía-sh [[hileen [bachée-sh]] xaxúa] áxpa-m
this woman-DET these men-DET all marry-DS
this woman married all these men

The second class is a stative verb that may function as a nominal modifier. This class includes: ahú 'many, much', hawa 'some', kooshtá 'few', sáawi 'how many, so many, some', and the numerals. This class may also be followed by a determiner. They may also function as clausal predicates.

Demonstrative Phrases: Q → DP Q Demonstratives are deictic words; in Crow, they occur phrase-initially. They can also cooccur with determiners (ex. 'this the horse').

Appositives: NP → NP NP /ko/ (demonstrative) and /kon/ (appositive) are used to modify each other.

[ko bachée-sh] [kon] día-k
that man-DET PRO do-DECL
'that man is the one who did it'

=== Relative clauses ===
Relative clauses in Crow are complex and subject to theoretical debates. There are two types of relative clauses in Crow: lexically headed and non-lexically headed. There are two basic relativizers ak- and ala-, several composite forms based on ala plus baa 'indefinite pronoun' and instances with no relativizer. ak- indicates the subject of the relative clause is relativized and marks the subject as animate, and generally agentive. It can occur in both lexically and non-lexically headed clauses. ala- may indicate a locative, temporal or manner adverbial is the head of the relative clause. In non-lexically headed relative clauses, ala- can sometimes be interpreted as the head of the clause itself. It can also occur in both lexically and non-lexically headed clauses. The relativizers are bound, with many exception, but they are generally prefixed to the word that contains the verb of the relative clause.

Relative clauses are marked with final determiners. If the definite referent of the relative clause has already been accounted in the discourse or is otherwise obvious, the relative clause is marked with the definite -sh. Relative clauses can also be marked with the indefinite determiner marker -m; generally this is used to imply that the referent is being introduced into the discourse for the first time. However, the nominal head is almost always marked by the indefinite determiner -m.

== Bibliography ==
- Graczyk, R. (2007). A Grammar of Crow: Apsáalooke Aliláau. Lincoln, NE: University of Nebraska Press. ISBN 978-0-8032-2196-3.
- Hollow, R. C., Jr.; Parks, Douglas R. (1980). "Studies in Plains linguistics: a review". In Wood, W. Raymond; Liberty, Margot (eds.). Anthropology on the Great Plains. Lincoln, NE: University of Nebraska Press. ISBN 978-0-8032-4708-6.
- Kasak, R. M. (2024). A Grammar of Mandan. Berlin: Language Science Press. ISBN 978-3-96110-495-6.
- Kaschube, D. V. (1978). Crow Texts. IJAL-NATS Monograph No. 2. Chicago, IL: University of Chicago Press. ISBN 978-0-226-56714-3.
- Kaschube, D. V. (1960). Structural Elements of Crow (Doctor of Philosophy dissertation, Department of Anthropology, Indiana University). Ann Arbor, MI: University Microfilms.
- Kaschube, D. V. (1967). Structural Elements of the Language of the Crow Indians of Montana. Boulder, CO: University of Colorado Press.
- Ko, E. (2023). Studies in Crow Linguistics: Documentation, Grammar, and History. Department of Linguistics (Doctor of Philosophy dissertation). Berkeley, CA: University of California, Berkeley.
- Lowie, R. H. (1945). "The Crow Language: Grammatical Sketch and Analyzed Text". University of California Publications in American Archaeology and Ethnology. 39. Berkeley and Los Angeles, CA: University of California Press: 1–139.
- Lowie, R. H. (1960). Crow Texts. Berkeley and Los Angeles, CA: University of California Press.
- Lowie, R. H. (1960). Crow Word Lists. Berkeley and Los Angeles, CA: University of California Press.
- Matthews, G. H. (1979). "Glottochronology and the separation of the Crow and Hidatsa". In Davis, Leslie B. (ed.). Symposium on the Crow-Hidatsa Separations. Bozeman, MT: Montana Archaeological Society.
- Silver, S.; Miller, W. R. (1997). American Indian Languages: Cultural and Social Contexts. Tucson: The University of Arizona Press. ISBN 978-0-8165-1802-9.
- Wallace, K. K. (1993). Verb Incorporation and Agreement in Crow. Department of Linguistics (Doctor of Philosophy dissertation). Los Angeles, CA: University of California, Los Angeles.
