= Dhegihan languages =

Siouan language group of North America

Dhegihan
- Cegiha
- Geographic distribution: Central North America
- Linguistic classification: Siouan: Western Siouan; Mississippi Valley Siouan; Dhegihan
- Subdivisions: Kansa–Osage †; Omaha–Ponca; Quapaw †

Language codes
- Linguasphere: 64-AAC-b
- Glottolog: dheg1241

The Dhegihan languages are a group of Siouan languages that include Kansa–Osage, Omaha–Ponca, and Quapaw. Their historical region included parts of the Ohio and Mississippi River Valleys, the Great Plains, and southeastern North America. The shared Dhegihan migration story places them as a united group in the late 1600s near the confluence of the Ohio and Tennessee rivers (southern Illinois and western Kentucky) which then moved westward towards the Missouri River, and separated into different bands. However, some oral traditions and archeological evidence indicate that Dhegihan speaking peoples may have migrated west out of the Ohio River Valley much earlier.

The Dhegihan languages were first described and classified as Siouan languages by James Dorsey in 1885. According to Dorsey, "Degiha" translates to "Belonging to the people of this land" or "Those who dwell here" in Omaha-Ponca. Other dialectical variants recorded by Dorsey with the same translation include "Ye-ga-ha" (Kansa), "De-ka-ha" (Osage), and "Ugapa" (Quapaw).

Kansa and Osage are mutually intelligible, meaning that they are two distinct dialects of a single language. The same is true for Omaha and Ponca.

The 2nd Annual Dhegiha Gathering in 2012 brought Kansa, Quapaw, Osage, Ponca and Omaha speakers together to share best practices in language revitalization.

== See also ==
- Robert L. Rankin – American linguist best-known for his preservation of the Kansa language
