= Quapaw, Oklahoma =

Town in the U.S. state of Oklahoma and capital of the Quapaw Nation

- Town and tribal capital
- Town of Quapaw
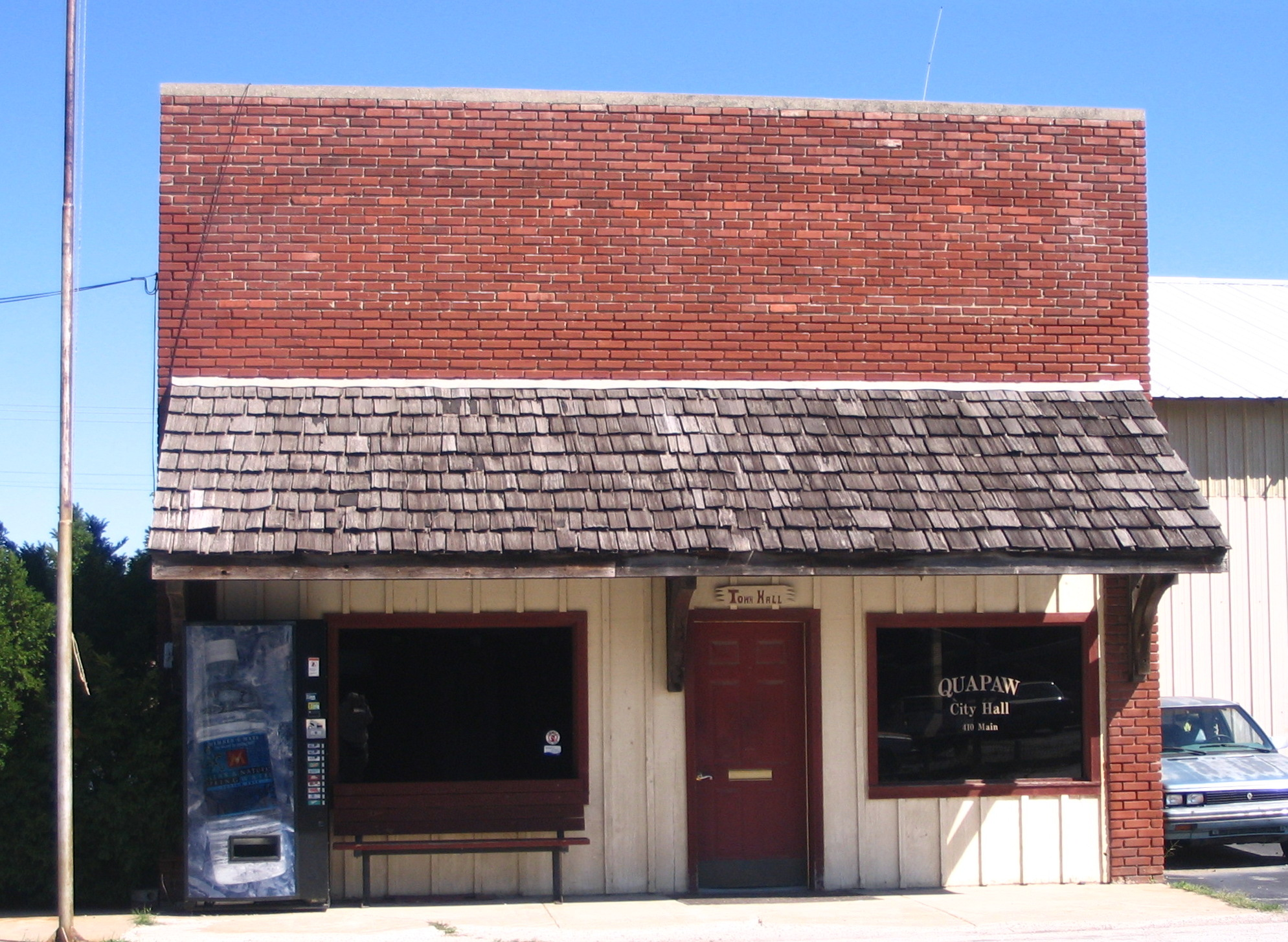
- Main façade of the Quapaw Town Hall
- Nickname: "The Hay Capital"
- Location in Ottawa County and Oklahoma

- Location in the United States
- Coordinates: 36°57′20″N 94°47′30″W
- Country: United States
- State: Oklahoma
- County: Ottawa
- Incorporated: 1917 (109 years ago)

Area
  - Total: 0.98 sq mi (2.53 km^{2})
  - Land: 0.98 sq mi (2.53 km^{2})
  - Water: 0 sq mi (0.00 km^{2})
- Elevation: 843 ft (257 m)

Population (2020)
  - Total: 811
  - Density: 830.7/sq mi (320.75/km^{2})
- Time zone: UTC-6 (Central (CST))
  - Summer (DST): UTC-5 (CDT)
- ZIP code: 74363
- Area codes: 539/918
- FIPS code: 40-61400
- GNIS feature ID: 2412515
- Highways: Historic Route 66; U.S. Highway 69

Quapaw (pronounced kwuh-PAW), officially the Town of Quapaw, is a town in Ottawa County, Oklahoma, United States, which serves as the capital of the Quapaw Nation. Located about 9 miles (14 km) northeast of Miami, it is part of the Joplin, Missouri metropolitan area. Incorporated in 1917, Quapaw's population was 811 in 2020.

== History ==
In 1891, Kansas farmer Isaac Bingham moved his family south into Ottawa County, then part of land assigned to the Quapaw Nation. It became part of the state of Oklahoma in 1907 after admission. The family founded a community and opened several businesses. Quapaw Chief John Quapaw donated land for a community school. The Kansas City, Fort Scott and Memphis Railroad established a railroad stop and siding at this site. This established access to markets for hay and agricultural products of the area, attracting more settlers. A post office was opened in the community grocery store in 1897.

The community leaders platted "New Town Quapaw" on land to the east that was purchased from Harry Whitebird (Quapaw). This "new" town was incorporated in 1917 as Quapaw. Discovery of lead and zinc ores in the area resulted in this area being developed as part of the Tri-State mining district. As thousands of miners moved into the larger area, a population boom occurred.

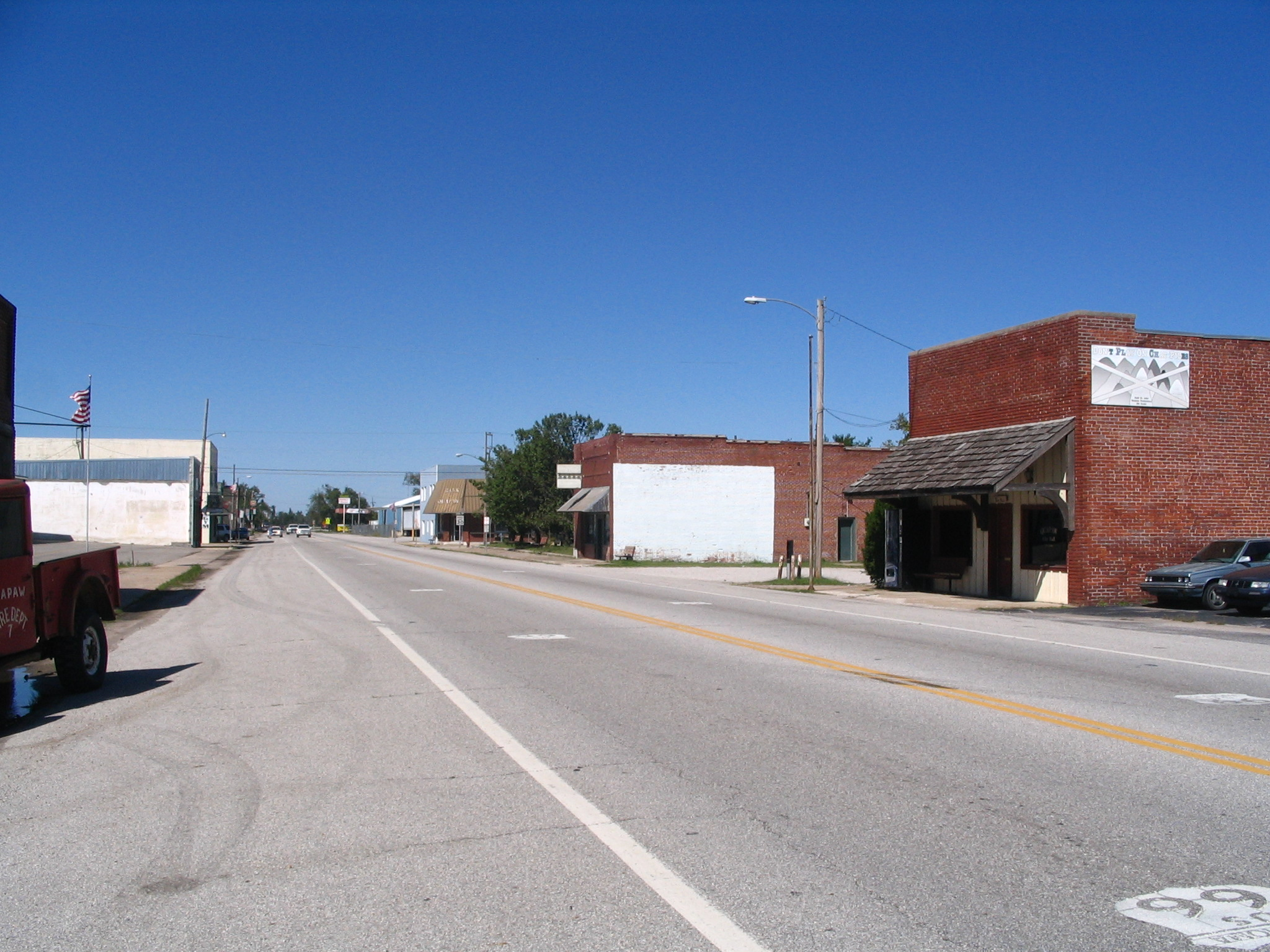
Historic Route 66 in Quapaw (2008)

The county had a significant population from several federally recognized tribes, such as the Quapaw. The population and economic boom stimulated development of new businesses. The 1920 census for the town listed 1,394 residents. In the 1920s, U. S. Route 66 was developed through Quapaw and was paved through Ottawa County by 1933. This event was celebrated with Quapaw Chief Victor Griffin laying a zinc tablet in the center of Main Street.

As the local mining operations began to decline before World War II, jobs left the region and the population declined to 1,054 by 1940, and to 850 by 1960. The region was left with widespread mine tailings, known as chat, and extensive environmental toxic hazards.

== Geography ==
According to the United States Census Bureau, the town has a total area of 0.6 square miles (1.6 km^{2}), all land. Quapaw is 9 miles (14 km) north of Miami and is the last town in Oklahoma on U.S. Highway 69A before the Kansas state line.

== Demographics ==
Historical population
| Census | Pop. | Note | %± |
|---|---|---|---|
| 1920 | 1,394 | | — |
| 1930 | 1,340 | | −3.9% |
| 1940 | 1,054 | | −21.3% |
| 1950 | 938 | | −11.0% |
| 1960 | 850 | | −9.4% |
| 1970 | 967 | | 13.8% |
| 1980 | 1,097 | | 13.4% |
| 1990 | 928 | | −15.4% |
| 2000 | 984 | | 6.0% |
| 2010 | 906 | | −7.9% |
| 2020 | 811 | | −10.5% |
U.S. Decennial Census

=== 2020 census ===
As of the 2020 census, Quapaw had a population of 811. The median age was 40.5 years. 22.4% of residents were under the age of 18 and 21.5% of residents were 65 years of age or older. For every 100 females there were 88.6 males, and for every 100 females age 18 and over there were 85.5 males age 18 and over.

0.0% of residents lived in urban areas, while 100.0% lived in rural areas.

There were 303 households in Quapaw, of which 36.0% had children under the age of 18 living in them. Of all households, 39.6% were married-couple households, 18.5% were households with a male householder and no spouse or partner present, and 32.0% were households with a female householder and no spouse or partner present. About 24.1% of all households were made up of individuals and 9.6% had someone living alone who was 65 years of age or older.

There were 342 housing units, of which 11.4% were vacant. The homeowner vacancy rate was 0.6% and the rental vacancy rate was 14.6%.

Racial composition as of the 2020 census
| Race | Number | Percent |
|---|---|---|
| White | 471 | 58.1% |
| Black or African American | 8 | 1.0% |
| American Indian and Alaska Native | 252 | 31.1% |
| Asian | 0 | 0.0% |
| Native Hawaiian and Other Pacific Islander | 1 | 0.1% |
| Some other race | 6 | 0.7% |
| Two or more races | 73 | 9.0% |
| Hispanic or Latino (of any race) | 26 | 3.2% |

=== 2000 census ===
As of the census of 2000, 984 people, 352 households, and 258 families resided in the town. The population density was 1,759.4 inhabitants per square mile (679.3/km^{2}). The 423 housing units had an average density of 756.3 per square mile (292.0/km^{2}). The racial makeup of the town was 68.60% White, 22.46% Native American, 0.20% Asian, 0.10% from other races, and 8.64% from two or more races. Hispanics or Latinos of any race were 1.52% of the population.

Of the 352 households, 31.5% had children under 18 living with them, 52.8% were married couples living together, 14.2% had a female householder with no husband present, and 26.7% were not families. About 22.4% of all households were made up of individuals, and 11.6% had someone living alone who was 65 or older. The average household size was 2.72, and the average family size was 3.16.

In the town, the age distribution was 28.7% under 18, 9.7% from 18 to 24, 22.8% from 25 to 44, 22.9% from 45 to 64, and 16.1% who were 65 or older. The median age was 35 years. For every 100 females, there were 97.2 males. For every 100 females age 18 and over, there were 87.2 males.

The median income for a household in the town was $24,083, and for a family was $29,375. Males had a median income of $25,625 versus $17,279 for females. The per capita income for the town was $10,182. About 22.3% of families and 28.3% of the population were below the poverty line, including 41.1% of those under age 18 and 18.1% of those age 65 or over.

== Education ==
Quapaw Public Schools operate area public schools.

== In popular culture ==
Quapaw is mentioned in the film Oklahoma as one of the towns in which the character Jud had worked at some point in the past. Jud recounted a fictional case of deadly arson that occurred five years prior to the film's setting.

Quapaw was mentioned in a 1976 episode of the television show M*A*S*H, a U.S. situation comedy. In the episode "The Colonel's Horse", when Colonel Potter goes to Tokyo on R&R, his horse develops colic. Mike Farrell's character B.J. said his wife Peg (played by Catherine Bergstrom) was from Quapaw and that his father-in-law knew all about horses; so, they called him for advice. Not coincidentally, fellow M*A*S*H cast member Judy Farrell, Mike Farrell's real-life wife at the time, was born in Quapaw. Mike Farrell mentioned the town and the writers loved it for the script.

== See also ==
- Quapaw Indian Agency
- Robert Whitebird Cultural Center, Quapaw Nation
- 2008 Picher–Neosho tornado, an EF4 tornado that narrowly avoided hitting the town in May 2008
