= Robert Whitebird Cultural Center =

Cultural and heritage center of the Quapaw Nation

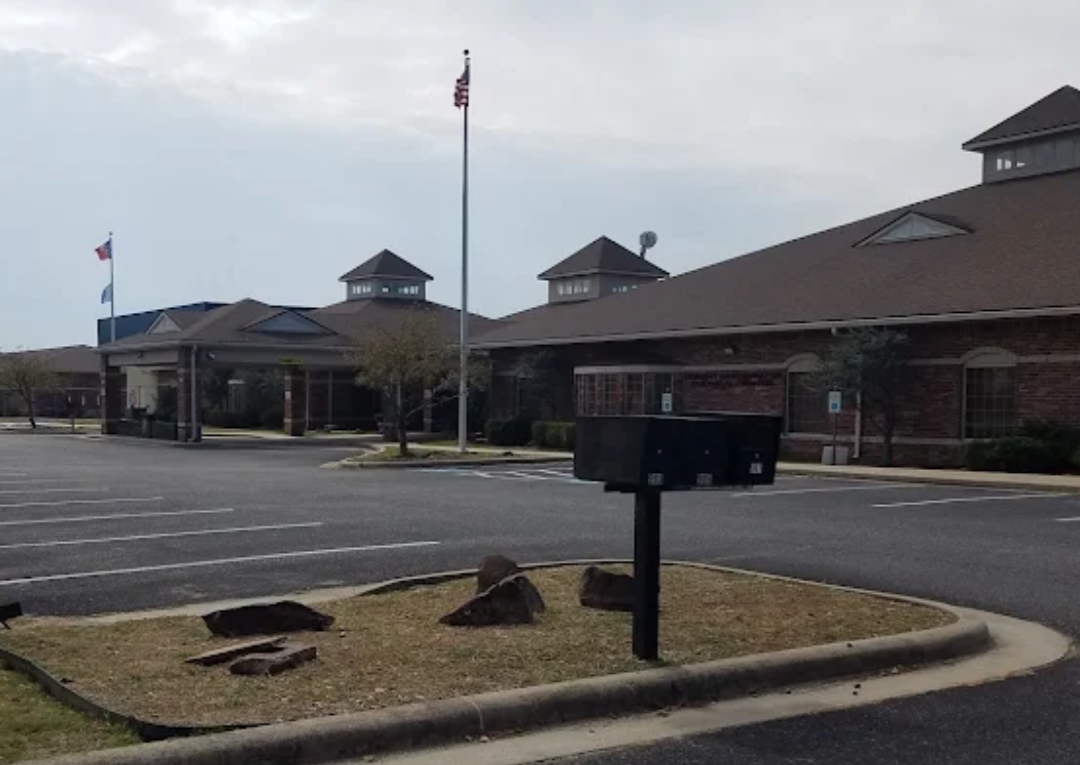
- Robert Whitebird Cultural Center in 2025
- Location: 905 Whitebird Street, Quapaw, Oklahoma, United States
- Coordinates: 36°56′43″N 94°47′10″W
- Type: Tribal cultural center
- Owner: Quapaw Nation
- Parking: Free on-site lot
- Website: quapawtribe.com/108/Tribal-Museum

The Robert Whitebird Cultural Center (also known as the RWCC, or simply Quapaw Museum) is the principal cultural and heritage center of the Quapaw Nation. It is located at 905 Whitebird Street in Quapaw, Oklahoma, near historic Route 66. The center houses the Quapaw Nation Museum, the Quapaw Tribal Library, the Quapaw Historic Preservation Program (QHPP), the Quapaw Nation Language Program, the tribal gift shop, the museum classroom, the anchor memorial from the USS Quapaw, and the Quapaw Veterans Wall.

== History and naming ==
The center is named in honor of Robert Whitebird, a respected Quapaw elder who died in 2005 at the age of 92. The building complex's name reflects its purpose as a place for safeguarding and teaching Quapaw history, culture, and identity.

Robert Whitebird was a "full blood" Quapaw who served as the first chairman of the Quapaw Business Committee when the Quapaw switched from chiefs to a democratically elected, unicameral government. Later in life he was a recognized spiritual leader for the Quapaw people. He also held prominent roles within broader Native American rights organizations. He was a founding member of the Oklahoma Indian Rights Association and a charter member of the National Congress of American Indians. His lifelong advocacy for Native rights contributed significantly to the institutional foundations of the modern Quapaw government and helped shape the cultural preservation efforts that the center now serves.

== Exhibitions ==
In April 2025, the Robert Whitebird Cultural Center hosted the special exhibition Around the Shoulders: Robes, Blankets, and Shawls, which opened during the Quapaw Spring Gathering on April 11, 2025. The exhibition presented the history of man-i-t'a, a Quapaw term meaning "that which is worn around the shoulders," and featured historic and contemporary Quapaw robes, blankets, shawls, painted hides, and family heirlooms. The exhibit included original tribal items, reproductions of historic robes, and materials documenting the cultural use of painted hides among the Quapaw. The exhibition was developed with contributions from several institutions, including the Arkansas Archeological Survey, Arkansas Post, and the Musée du Quai Branly – Jacques Chirac. Local media coverage was provided by KOAM News, which featured the exhibition throughout its opening weekend. The exhibition remained on display throughout 2025.

In 2024 the Quapaw Tribal Museum at the Robert Whitebird Cultural Center installed a special exhibit titled “Quapaw Royalty Through the Years.” The exhibit honored past Quapaw Tribal Princesses and related royalty titles by displaying photographs and information about individuals who served in these roles. Public posts also noted the museum’s efforts to recognize former royalty.

In 2024, the Robert Whitebird Cultural Center participated in a national exhibition at the National Museum of the American Indian. The Quapaw Treaty of 1818 was featured in the Smithsonian Institution's "Nation to Nation: Treaties Between the United States and American Indian Nations" exhibition, and the Quapaw Nation Museum sent a delegate to Washington, D.C. as part of the Quapaw representation for the opening event.

Later, in November 2024, the Robert Whitebird Cultural Center participated in the 200th anniversary commemoration of the 1824 Treaty between the Quapaw Nation and the United States. The original treaty was placed on public display during the Quapaw Nation Fall Gathering at Downstream Casino Resort. Staff from the Robert Whitebird Cultural Center and Cultural Affairs Division worked with the Arkansas State Archives and regional partners to facilitate the temporary installation. The event received local news coverage and allowed the public to view a foundational Quapaw historical document.

In 2023, the Quapaw Tribal Museum presented a community-centered Buckskin Display featuring historic and contemporary buckskin dresses. The museum invited community members to share garments and personal stories, and the display was highlighted publicly during the Quapaw Nation powwow weekend.

In 2022, a special exhibit at the Robert Whitebird Cultural Center documented the long history of the Quapaw Powwow, for which the 150th anniversary was being observed. The exhibit presented early accounts of the gathering, displayed the changes in its location over time depending on the Quapaw families who hosted it, and highlighted the continuity of the event in the same general area for more than one hundred and fifty years. Historical photographs, maps, and materials from different decades were displayed to show how the celebration developed into the modern Quapaw Powwow.

The Robert Whitebird Cultural Center also contributed to exhibition development at First Americans Museum (FAM) in Oklahoma City. Staff from the Quapaw Nation Museum participated in the Quapaw Nation content included in FAM's Tribal Nations Gallery, which was documented in the museum's published Quapaw Nation Gallery Guide.

== Functions and departments ==
=== Museum and gift shop ===
The Quapaw Nation Museum opened in October 2009. It offers free admission and includes a permanent cultural history timeline, rotating special exhibits, and displays of family heirlooms and tribally significant objects. The collection features artifacts including Quapaw pottery dating back approximately 850 to 900 years, along with photographs, clothing, and other historical items. In addition there are many other features such as pictures of tribal leaders going back until the 19th century. A majority of the collection consists of donations from Quapaw families.

A 2015 article in The Joplin Globe described the museum's role in presenting Quapaw history and highlighted important parts of its collection. In 2024, a quilt embroidered with the names of 36 Quapaw World War II veterans was returned to the museum for permanent preservation, an event covered in regional news.

The museum accepts donations and loans of artifacts and historical photographs related to the Quapaw Nation. The gift shop supports tribal artisans and cultural outreach.

=== Tribal library ===
The Quapaw Tribal Library provides books, periodicals, audiobooks, digital materials, and access to research databases. It holds rare materials on Quapaw history, language, culture, and heritage. It is the only library located within the Quapaw reservation and the only public library between Miami, Oklahoma and Baxter Springs, Kansas.

=== Historic Preservation Program ===
The Quapaw Historic Preservation Program is headquartered at the cultural center. The program reviews federal undertakings under Section 106 of the National Historic Preservation Act, maintains a cultural resource inventory, and provides guidance to federal, state, and local agencies on cultural resource protection.

The Quapaw Historic Preservation Program operates within the national network of Tribal Historic Preservation Offices (THPO). National heritage organizations have noted the important role THPOs play in protecting traditional cultural properties and places of significance to Native communities.

The Quapaw Tribal Historic Preservation Officer (THPO) serves as the Eastern Oklahoma representative to the National Association of Tribal Historic Preservation Officers (NATHPO). The Quapaw Nation THPO had held this role for over a decade.

=== Language program ===
The Quapaw Nation Language Program operates within the center and provides classes, curriculum materials, and community resources to support the revitalization of the Quapaw language. It collaborates with tribal citizens, students, and researchers to strengthen language knowledge and cultural continuity.

=== Memorials and commemorative features ===
The grounds of the center include the anchor from the USS Quapaw and a Veterans Wall that each respectively honors those who served in the USS "Quapaw" and Quapaw citizens who served in the United States military.

== Public role and community engagement ==
The Robert Whitebird Cultural Center is free and open to the public. Housing the museum, library, preservation office, language program, memorials, and gift shop in one location provides a unified space for heritage preservation, research, cultural education, and community memory. Independent media coverage, including reports from KSMU and The Joplin Globe, highlights the center's active role in preserving and sharing Quapaw history.

== Significance ==
The center functions as a comprehensive tribal cultural complex. It brings together museum collections, archival and library resources, historic preservation work, language revitalization, memorial installations, and community programming. The Robert Whitebird Cultural Center plays a central role in preserving and promoting the heritage, history, and identity of the Quapaw people. These efforts are part of a growing movement among Native nations to strengthen language, history, and cultural identity through tribally led institutions such as museums, libraries, and preservation programs. Employees have also participated in international collaborations and cross-border discussions focused on Indigenous heritage and community-driven museum practice. These partnerships place Quapaw preservation work within a broader global dialogue on Indigenous cultural continuity and the role of community-based institutions in safeguarding traditional knowledge.

== See also ==
- Association of Tribal Archives, Libraries, & Museums
- Cultural tourism
- Quapaw Nation
