= Western Siouan languages =

Language family native to North America

Western Siouan
- Siouan Proper
- Geographic distribution: central North America
- Linguistic classification: Siouan: Western Siouan
- Subdivisions: Missouri River (Crow–Hidatsa); Mandan; Mississippi Valley (Central); Ohio Valley (Southeastern)

Language codes
- Glottolog: core1249
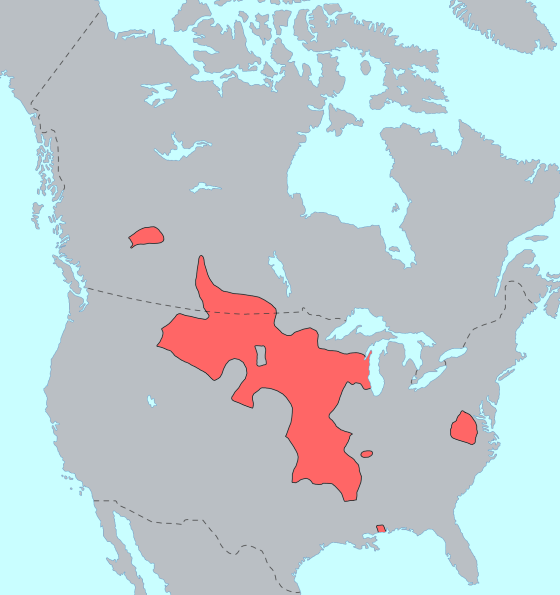
- Pre-contact distribution of the Western Siouan languages

The Western Siouan languages – also called Siouan proper, Core Siouan, or simply Siouan – are a large language family native to North America. They are closely related to the Catawban languages, sometimes called Eastern Siouan, and together with them constitute the Siouan (Siouan–Catawban) language family.

Linguistic and historical records indicate a possible southern origin of the Siouan people, with migrations over a thousand years ago from North Carolina and Virginia to Ohio. Some continued down the Ohio River, to the Mississippi and up to the Missouri. Others went down the Mississippi, settling in what is now Alabama, Mississippi and Louisiana. Others traveled across Ohio to what is now Illinois, Wisconsin, and Minnesota, home of the Dakota.

== Family division ==
The Siouan family proper consists of some 18 languages and various dialects:

- Siouan
  - Mandan †
    - Nuptare
    - Nuetare
  - Missouri River Siouan (a.k.a. Crow–Hidatsa)
    - Crow (a.k.a. Absaroka, Apsaroka, Apsaalooke, Upsaroka) – 3,500 speakers
    - Hidatsa (a.k.a. Minitari, Minnetaree) – 200 speakers
  - Mississippi Valley Siouan (a.k.a. Central Siouan)
    - ?Mitchigamea †
    - Dakotan (a.k.a. Sioux–Assiniboine–Stoney)
      - Nakoda
        - Assiniboine – 150 speakers
        - Stoney – 3,200 speakers
      - Sioux – 25,000 speakers
        - Lakota – 2,100 speakers
        - Dakota (sometimes classified as Western and Eastern Dakota) – 290 speakers
    - Chiwere-Winnebago
      - Chiwere †
      - Ho-Chunk – 250 speakers
    - Dhegihan
      - Omaha–Ponca – 85 speakers
      - Kansa-Osage
        - Kansa †
        - Osage †
      - Quapaw †
  - Ohio Valley Siouan
    - Virginia Siouan
      - Tutelo †
      - Moneton †
    - Mississippi Siouan
      - Biloxi †
      - Ofo †

(†) – Extinct language

Another view of both the Dakotan and Mississippi Valley branches is to represent them as dialect continuums.

All the Virginia Siouan dialects listed here are thought to have been closely related to one another; the term Tutelo language is also used in reference to their common tongue.

== Writing systems ==
There are two systems used to transcribe within this family:

- Latin alphabet used by a majority of these languages.
- Osage script, developed in 2005 by Herman Mongrain Lookout. There are also considerations for the script to be extensively usable for other languages in the Dhegiha group to the extent of this family.

== See also ==
- Siouan–Catawban languages

== Bibliography ==
- Parks, Douglas R.; & Rankin, Robert L. (2001). "The Siouan languages", in R. J. DeMallie (Ed.), Handbook of North American Indians: Plains (Vol. 13, Part 1, pp. 94–114). W. C. Sturtevant (Gen. Ed.). Washington, D.C.: Smithsonian Institution. ISBN 0-16-050400-7.
- Rood, David S.; & Taylor, Allan R. (1996). "Sketch of Lakhota, a Siouan language", in Handbook of North American Indians: Languages (Vol. 17, pp. 440–482). Washington DC: Smithsonian Institution.
- Ullrich, Jan. (2008). New Lakota Dictionary: Incorporating the Dakota Dialects of Santee–Sisseton and Yankton–Yanktonai (Lakota Language Consortium). ISBN 0-9761082-9-1.
