= James Owen Dorsey =

American anthropologist (1848–1895)

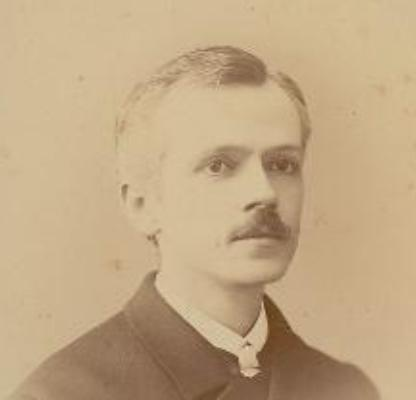
- Born: October 31, 1848; Baltimore, Maryland
- Died: February 4, 1895 (aged 46); Washington, D.C.
- Known for: Siouan languages
- Scientific career
- Fields: Ethnology

James Owen Dorsey (October 31, 1848 – February 4, 1895) was an American ethnologist, linguist, and Episcopalian missionary in the Dakota Territory, who contributed to the description of the Ponca, Omaha, and other southern Siouan languages. He worked for the Bureau of American Ethnology of the Smithsonian Institution from 1880 to 1895, when he died young of typhoid fever. He became known as the expert on languages and culture of southern Siouan peoples, although he also studied tribes of the Southwest and Northwest.

Dorsey also collected much material on beliefs and institutions, although most of his manuscripts have not been published. Some of the many stories he collected from the Ponca and Osage have been published, and are being used in an Omaha-language curriculum project at the University of Nebraska–Lincoln.

== Early life and education ==
James Owen Dorsey was born in Baltimore, Maryland, in 1848. He attended the Virginia Theological Seminary in Alexandria, and was ordained as a deacon of the Episcopal Church in 1871. He was a descendant of Edward Dorsey.

== Career ==
That year he became a missionary to the Ponca Indians in the Dakota Territory. His aptitude for languages and sympathetic personality won him the confidence of the Indians. He lived 27 months as a missionary in Nebraska and South Dakota, learning the difficult (for English speakers) Siouan language of the Ponca and Omaha Indians.

Ill health forced Dorsey to leave the West and to become a pastor in Maryland. He continued to study linguistics and to work on linguistic analysis of Ponca and Omaha. In the early years, he tried to link those languages with Hebrew, in the mistaken theory, shared by many scholars at the time, that Native Americans were among the Lost Tribes of Israel. These efforts were considered "crude and immature." But, he developed into a linguist and anthropologist who presented Indian cultures with "unsurpassed fidelity."

In 1878, in the formative period of the Bureau of American Ethnology (BAE) as part of the Smithsonian Institution, the director John Wesley Powell engaged Dorsey to return to Nebraska to compile dictionaries of the Omaha and Ponca languages. In 1880, Dorsey returned to Washington to work with the BAE at the Smithsonian as a specialist in Siouan languages, a position he held for the rest of his life.

Dorsey later did field work with the Siouan-speaking Tutelo in Canada, the Biloxi in Louisiana, and the Quapaw in Oklahoma. In addition, he studied several tribes along the Oregon coast, where he compiled materials on the Athabaskan (also called Dene), Coosan, Takilman, and Yakonan language families or "stocks", some of which were spoken by small groups of people. In 1884 he was the last to record the Yakona (Yaquina) language, which is now extinct.

Dorsey also compiled word lists and dictionaries of the Kansa and Osage languages. He became the foremost expert on the languages and culture of southern Siouan peoples. Many of his extensive compilations of vocabulary, grammar, myths, oral histories, and cultural practices are still unpublished. Dorsey also compiled word lists and dictionaries of the Kansa. and Osage languages.

He became the foremost expert on the languages and culture of southern Siouan peoples. Many of his extensive compilations of vocabulary, grammar, myths, oral histories, and cultural practices are still unpublished, but some of his papers are stored at the National Anthropological Archives. and are undergoing digitization.

Dorsey died of typhoid fever in 1895 in Washington, D.C. at age 47.

== See also ==
- Dorsey's law – A sound law in the Ho-Chunk language named after Dorsey

== Publications ==
- A Dictionary of the Biloxi and Ofo languages, accompanied with thirty-one Biloxi tests and numerous Biloxi phrases, 1912
- A Dakota-English dictionary, Edited by James Owen Dorsey, 1968
- "Omaha and Ponca Letters" (1890), (Contributions to North American Ethnography VI), supplement, 1891
- Omaha Dwellings, Furniture and Implements, 1892–1893
- Osage Traditions, 1888
- Omaha Sociology, 1884
- The Cehiga Language, 1890
