= Omaha–Ponca language =

Language of the Omaha and Ponca people

Omaha–Ponca
- Umoⁿhoⁿ, P’ą́’k’a
- Native to: United States
- Region: Nebraska and Oklahoma
- Ethnicity: Omaha, Ponca
- Native speakers: 85 (2008)
- Language family: Siouan: Western Siouan; Mississippi Valley; Dhegiha; Omaha–Ponca
- Dialects: Omaha; Ponca

Language codes
- ISO 639-3: oma
- Glottolog: omah1247
- ELP: Omaha-Ponca
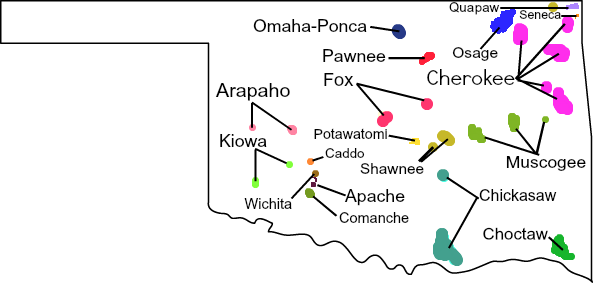
- Map showing the distribution of Oklahoma Indian Languages

- Omaha–Ponca is classified as Critically Endangered by the UNESCO Atlas of the World's Languages in Danger.

- People: Umoⁿhoⁿ, P’ą́’k’a
- Language: Iyé, Gáxe
- Country: Umoⁿhoⁿ Mazhóⁿ, P’ą́’k’a Mąžą́

Omaha–Ponca is a Dhegihan language of the Siouan language family, spoken by the Omaha (Umoⁿhoⁿ) people of Nebraska and the Ponca (P’ą́’k’a) people of Oklahoma and Nebraska. The two dialects differ minimally but are considered distinct languages by their speakers.

== Use and revitalization efforts ==
As of 2008, there are only 50 fluent speakers of Omaha and 35 fluent speakers of Ponca. All fluent speakers are elderly.

The University of Nebraska–Lincoln offered classes in the Omaha language in the 2000s and 2010s, but no longer does, as of 2025; its Omaha Language Curriculum Development Project (OLCDP) still provides Internet-based materials for learning the language. A February 2015 article gives the number of fluent speakers as 12, all over age 70, which includes two qualified teachers; the Tribal Council estimates about 150 people have some ability in the language. The language is taught at the Umónhon Nation Public School. An Omaha Basic iPhone app has been developed by the Omaha Nation Public Schools (UNPS) and the Omaha Language Cultural Center (ULCC). Members of the Osage Nation of Oklahoma have expressed an interest in partnerships to use the language as a basis of revitalizing the Osage language, which is similar. Louis Headman edited a dictionary of the Ponca People, published by the University of Nebraska Press.

== Phonology ==
=== Consonants ===
		Labial	Dental	Post- alveolar	Velar	Glottal
Nasal		m ⟨m⟩	n ⟨n⟩			
Plosive/ Affricate	voiced	b ⟨b⟩	d ⟨d⟩	dʒ ⟨j⟩	ɡ ⟨g⟩	
Plosive/ Affricate	tenuis	p ⟨p⟩	t ⟨t⟩	tʃ ⟨ch⟩	k ⟨k⟩	ʔ ⟨’⟩
Plosive/ Affricate	aspirated	pʰ ⟨pʰ⟩	tʰ ⟨tʰ⟩	tʃʰ ⟨chʰ⟩	kʰ ⟨kʰ⟩	
Plosive/ Affricate	ejective	pʼ ⟨pʼ⟩	tʼ ⟨tʼ⟩			
Fricative	voiced		z ⟨z⟩	ʒ ⟨zh⟩	ɣ ⟨gh⟩	
Fricative	tenuis		s ⟨s⟩	ʃ ⟨sh⟩	x ⟨x⟩	
Fricative	ejective		sʼ ⟨sʼ⟩	ʃʼ ⟨shʼ⟩	xʼ ⟨xʼ⟩	
Approximant		w ⟨w⟩	lᶞ ⟨th⟩			h ⟨h⟩

- /p, t, tʃ, k/ may also be heard as tense [pː, tː, tʃː, kː] in free variation.
- One consonant, sometimes written l or th, is a velarized lateral approximant with interdental release, [ɫᶞ], found for example in ní btháska [ˌnĩ ˈbɫᶞaska] "flat water" (Platte River), the source of the name Nebraska. It varies freely from [ɫ] to a light [ð̞], and derives historically from Siouan *r.
- Initial consonant clusters include approximates, as in /blᶞ/ and /ɡlᶞ/.
- Consonants are written as in the IPA in school programs, apart from the alveopalatals j, ch, chʰ, zh, sh, shʼ, the glottal stop ’, the voiced velar fricative gh, and the dental approximant th. Historically, this th has also been written dh, ð, ¢, and the sh and x as c and q; the tenuis stops p t ch k have either been written upside-down or double (pp, kk, etc.). These latter unusual conventions serve to distinguish these sounds from the p t ch k of other Siouan languages, which are not specified for voicing and so may sound like either Omaha–Ponca p t ch k or b d j g. The letters f, l, q, r, v are not used in writing Omaha–Ponca.

=== Vowels ===
	Front		Central		Back	
	oral	nasal	oral	nasal	oral	nasal
Close	i	ĩ			u	
Mid	e				(o)	(õ)
Open			a	ã		

The simple vowels are /a, e, i, u/, plus a few words with /o/ in men's speech. The letter ‘o’ is phonemically /au/, and phonetically [əw].

There are two or three nasal vowels, depending on the variety. In the Omaha and Ponca Dhegiha dialects *õ and *ã have merged unconditionally as /õ/, which may range across [ã] ~ [õ] ~ [ũ] and is written ⟨oⁿ⟩ in Omaha and ⟨aⁿ⟩ in Ponca. The close front nasal vowel /ĩ/ remains distinct.

Nasalized vowels are fairly new to the Ponca language. Assimilation has taken place leftward, as opposed to right to left, from nasalized consonants over time. "Originally when the vowel was oral, it nasalized the consonant and a nasalized vowel never followed suit, instead, the nasalized vowel came to preceded it"; though this is not true for the Omaha, or its 'mother' language."

Omaha–Ponca is a tonal language that utilizes downstep (accent) or a lowering process that applies to the second of two high-tone syllables. A downstepped high tone would be slightly lower than the preceding high tone.”: wathátʰe /walᶞaꜜtʰe/ "food", wáthatʰe /waꜜlᶞatʰe/ "table". Vowel length is distinctive in accented syllables, though it is often not written: [nãːꜜde] "heart", [nãꜜde] "(inside) wall".

Omaha–Ponca is a Siouan-Catawban language but has developed some of its own rules for nasalization and aspiration. What were once allophones in Proto-Siouan-Catawban have become phonemes in the Omaha–Ponca language.

Many contrasts in the Omaha–Ponca language are unfamiliar to speakers of English. Below are examples of minimal pairs for some sounds which in English would be considered allophones, but in Omaha–Ponca constitute different phonemes:

Contrast	Word	Gloss	Word	Gloss
[p] vs. [pʰ]	[pa]	head/nose	[pʰa]	bitter
[i] vs. [ĩ]	[nazhi]	to go out	[nazhĩ́]	to stand
[t] vs. [tʼ]	[tṍde]	the ground	[t’ṍde]	during future early autumns

In many languages nasalization of vowels would be a part of assimilation to the next consonant, but Omaha–Ponca is different because it is always assimilating. For example: iⁿdáthiⁿga, meaning mysterious, moves from a nasalized /i/ to an alveolar, stop. Same thing happens with the word iⁿshte, meaning, for example, has the nasalized /i/ which does not assimilate to another nasal. It changes completely to an alveolar fricative.

== Morphology ==
The Omaha–Ponca language adds endings to its definite articles to indicate animacy, number, position and number. Ponca definite articles indicate animacy, position and number.

morphological ending	gloss meaning
-kʰe	for inanimate horizontal object
-tʰe	for inanimate standing object
-ðaⁿ	for inanimate round object
akʰá	for singular animate agent
-amá	for singular animate agent in motion or plural
-tʰaⁿ	for animate singular patient in standing position
ðiⁿ	for animate singular patient in motion
-ma	for animate plural patient in motion
-ðiⁿkʰé	for animate singular patient in sitting position
-ðaⁿkʰá	for animate plural patient in sitting position

== Syntax ==
Omaha–Ponca's syntactic type is subject–object–verb.
