= Protohistory of West Virginia =

Protohistorical period

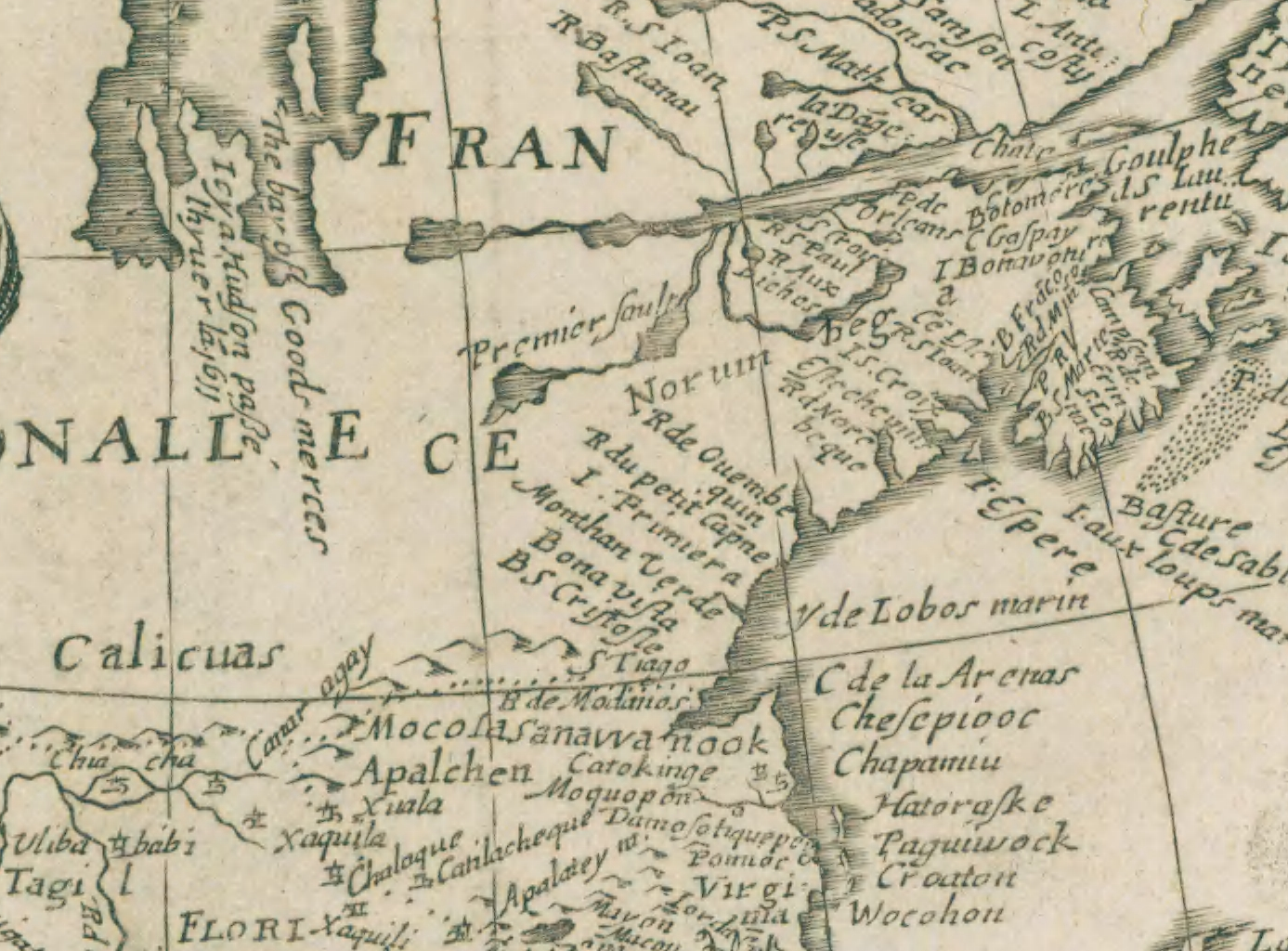
Section of a 1671 French map

The protohistoric period of the state of West Virginia in the United States began in the mid-sixteenth century with the arrival of European trade goods. Explorers and colonists brought these goods to the eastern and southern coasts of North America and were brought inland by native trade routes. This was a period characterized by increased intertribal strife, rapid population decline, the abandonment of traditional life styles, and the extinction and migrations of many Native American groups.

Written accounts of the area begin by the late seventeenth or early eighteenth century with the scattered documentation and journals of early explorers. These accounts frequently portray a sparsely inhabited area, possibly due to the Haudenosaunee (Iroquois) wars to monopolize the European fur trade or the devastating effects of new diseases introduced by Europeans.

== Archaeological cultures ==
During the climatic warming of the Medieval Warm Period (900–1200 CE), the introduction of the bow and arrow and maize led many Late Woodland period groups in Eastern and Southern North America to develop sedentary agriculture based societies, which lead to larger populations.

The harsh droughts and cold winters during the Little Ice Age (sixteenth to nineteenth centuries), put these larger groups under severe social stress as they competed for scarcer resources, such as less timber, less fertile farm land and fewer game animals. These groups were already unstable when Europeans arrived during the sixteenth century with superior weapons and diseases to which the native populations had no resistance. Many of these groups are now only known through the archaeological record.

=== Fort Ancient and Monongahela ===
Groups of the Fort Ancient and Monongahela cultures lived in the western part of the state (and in the adjoining states of Pennsylvania, Maryland, Ohio and Kentucky) along the Ohio River and its tributaries. Late Fort Ancient (1400 to 1750) and Late Monongahela (1580 to 1635) peoples began consolidating their villages into larger settlements with more defensive measures such as wooden palisades during this time. Archaeologists suggest that this means that intergroup strife had increased, with the smaller settlements amalgamating into larger entities for mutual protection. These cultures were very similar and were both influenced by Mississippian cultures to their south and west. Exotic trade items from the Mississippian regions have been found in excavated Fort Ancient and Monongahela villages. These items include shell gorgets from Eastern Tennessee, a head pot similar to those produced in the Central Mississippi Valley by the peoples of the Middle Mississippian Parkin and Nodena phases, and pottery with motifs and decoration methods connected with Angel phase sites in the Lower Ohio Valley. Such items made their way into this region through long established native trade routes.

European items were deposited into the archaeological record at sites such as Lower Shawneetown and Hardin Village in nearby Greenup County, Kentucky and the Buffalo, Rolf Lee and Clover sites in Putnam, Mason and Cabell Countys in West Virginia, which have all produced European metal objects dated after 1550. These objects came from Spanish, French, and English explorers who had begun to explore the eastern seaboard and Gulf Coast of the present United States by the sixteenth century.

One such expedition that left objects in the archaeological record was the de Soto Entrada of the early 1540s, which encountered many Late Mississippian groups. This expedition spent almost four years trekking from Florida up to the eastern Tennessee region, down through Alabama, across Mississippi to Eastern Arkansas, through Northern Louisiana and into Texas, before doubling back to Arkansas and down the Mississippi to Mexico by way of the Gulf of Mexico. These groups were extinct by the time Europeans colonized West Virginia, either becoming victims of European diseases, which at times had as much as a 90% death rate among Native American populations, or migrating to other areas to avoid intergroup warfare such as the Beaver Wars to control the fur trade.

The Franquelin map of Ohio also shows an unidentified people labelled the "Casa" as existing roughly in the region of what is now Ohio which was once occupied by the Monongahela. It's possible that this name could be connected to them. Archaeology has also shown odd traits among the people, such as domestication of turkeys & the building of stone walls across certain mountain valleys. The uses of the walls are unknown, but they may have been used to control movement through the regions & seem to have also been used as traps to pen in and slaughter Forest Buffalo & other large game, according to a great deal of animal bones found at such sites.

Archaeology seems to show an influx of Siouan speaking people into the region forcing them to the northernmost reaches of their territory during the 15th & 16th centuries and a possible union with the Fort Ancient culture to the west. See also Shenandoah.

== Historic groups ==
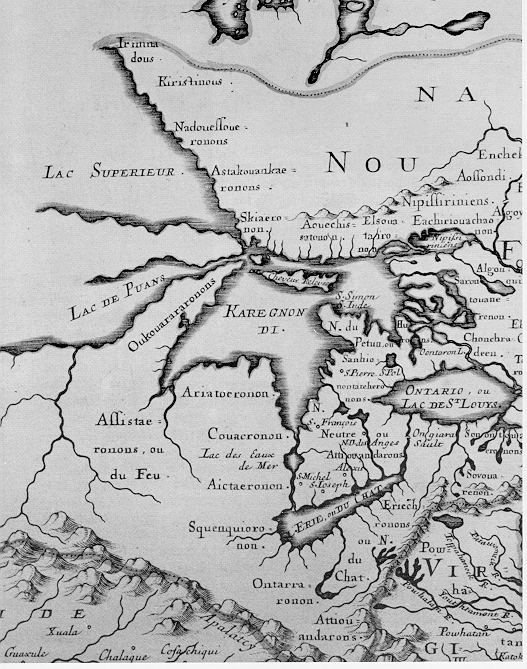
Clip of 1656 (3) Le Canada Ou Nouvelle France &C. by Nicolas Sanson. Huronian Confederacy Iroquois dialect Akounake means "people of a strange language" and Attiouandron means "people of a similar language," based on Canadian Jesuit writings before 1650 from the Récollets. Earlier scholars find the latter phrase near the "Riviere de la Ronceverte" (Greenbrier River). The first Récollet missionaries arrived at Kébec, an Algonquin word meaning "where the river narrows", at a narrowing of the Saint Lawrence River, on June 2, 1615 (Québec City Tourism: History) It was declared the early French Jesuits did not see the main Ohio River during these decades.

This region was inhabited by members of several different major language families when Europeans first arrived. These groups shared similar cultures, but spoke languages that had diverged from each other over thousands of years. Archaeological cultures such as the Monongahela and Fort Ancient groups may have been confederacies whose constituent members did not all speak a common language instead of individual peoples or communities. The major language groups inhabiting the West Virginia region were the Central Algonquian, Iroquoian and Ohio Valley Siouan.

In the seventeenth century, Native Americans groups had not yet formed the large political "tribes" known from the historical era during the eighteenth and nineteenth centuries, and many tribal names used in historical literature do not apply in the seventeenth century. Many tribal names were actually amalgamations of earlier groups that had been decimated by wars and disease and banded together for mutual safety. Groups were also known by many different names, which also made identifying specific groups difficult. Group names were often recorded before the group met Europeans, and was frequently the name that enemies knew them by and in a different language family from what the group themselves spoke. These names were then transliterated into several European written languages, particularly French, English, Dutch, and Spanish. These European languages often had different phonetic stylings for the foreign languages of the Native Americans, and this translation and transliteration was conducted in an era before many modern writing conventions, resulting in inconsistent spelling, grammar and alphabetic characters.

=== Algonquian groups ===
The Algonquian peoples were one of the most populous and widespread North American native language groups, with tribes originally numbering in the hundreds. They were most concentrated in the New England region. The Central Algonquian languages are a subgroup of the Algonquian family, itself a member of the Algic language family. The languages are grouped together because they were spoken near each other, not because they are any closer related to one another than to any other Algonquian language. Within the Central Algonquian grouping, the only languages known to be more closely related to each other than to any other Algonquian languages are Potawatomi and Ojibwe. However, there is some evidence for a larger subbranch "Eastern Great Lakes" or "Core Central", consisting of Ojibwe-Potawatomi, Miami-Illinois, Fox-Sauk-Kickapoo, and Shawnee, and excluding Cree-Montagnais and Menominee. At the time of the European arrival, the Haudenosaunee or Iroquois Confederacy was regularly at war with its Algonquian neighbours and forced other tribes out of Haudenosaunee-occupied territories.

==== Shawnee ====
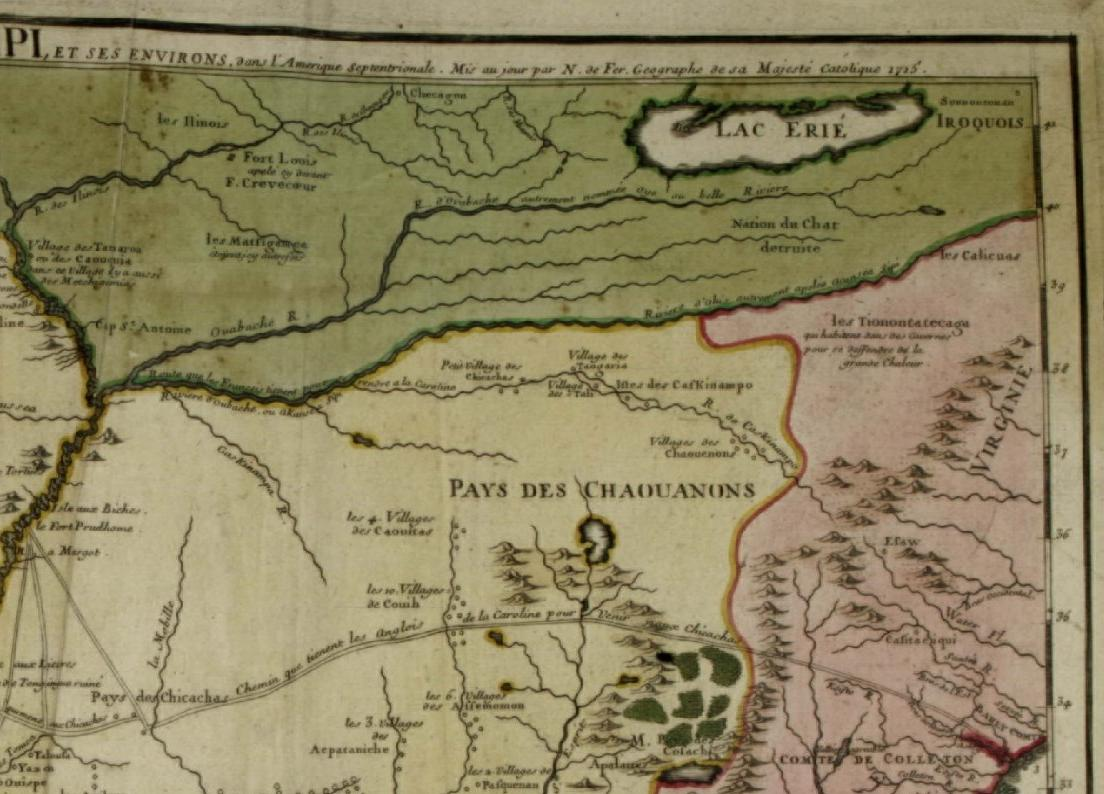
1715 Nicolas de Fer map showing the River of the Chaouanons

This tribe, known variously as the Shawnee, Chaouanon, Shaawanwaki, Shaawanooki, Shaawanowi lenaweeki, Sawanogi, Sawanons and Savanoa, was one of the more mobile of the tribes encountered by early European explorers. They occupied areas Delaware and Pennsylvania to the Ohio Valley region in West Virginia, Kentucky and Ohio, the Cumberland River region of Central Tennessee, and in Georgia, where the Savannah River is named for them. The tribe consisted of a number of autonomous subdivisions known as "septs" who shared a common language and culture: the Mekoche, Pekowi, Chalahgawtha, Hathawekela and Kispoko. This tribe may have been indigenous to the West Virginia, Ohio, and Kentucky area and could be descendants of the Fort Ancient or Monangahela cultures. Some protohistoric Shawnee villages have been found at locations that were former Fort Ancient sites, such as Lower Shawneetown. Their mobile lifestyle may have been due to being driven from their ancestral homelands by the Haudenosaunee Confederacy. They are usually described as being in a near constant state of war with the Haudenosaunee Confederacy, who were making inroads during the protohistoric period into the Ohio Valley region in a bid to control the fur trade. The Shawnee, under Tecumseh, sided with the British during the War of 1812 and were removed to the west of the Mississippi River after the war.

Like the Cisca (Yuchi territory) in neighboring Tennessee, this area's Shawnee Cheskepe village originally traded with the Spanish. Kentucky is derived from a Haudenosaunee word, kentáke, meaning "where prairies are." Another Shawnee village known as Eskippakithiki was located on Upper Howard Creek (Kentucky River Basin) was called "kenta aki," meaning the "place of level land," by the Haudenosaunee. A few peculiar artifacts are found in collections from the curious protohistoric period. At Madisonville, intertribal trade ending in the 1610s included Basque kettle parts and Clarksdale bell type associated with the "de Soto entrada" variety of artifacts, and other. Basque kettle parts and brass have been found similar to a few St. Lawrence River early protohistoric fisherman locations. The Algonquian language of Core Central consists of Ojibwe–Potawatomi, Shawnee, Sauk-Fox-Kickapoo, and Miami-Illinois — Eastern Great Lakes languages.

The Shawnee attacked the Onondaga in the winter of 1661–1662. The Onondaga also attacked the Shawnee village of Ontouagannha on the Ohio River eight years earlier. In April, 1663, the Susquehannock village on the upper Ohio River was attacked by Seneca, Cayuga, and Onondaga. The Treaty of Camp Charlotte, 1774 finalized in 1775 by Captain John Connolly, invited a final local phratry of splinter Shawnee, Chief Cornstalk's sister, Nonhelema clan, to live about the Mouth of the Kanawha.

Among the Cornstalk oratory, there is a story of young Kentucky warriors who mistakenly massacrued "Spiritual or Holy People" in southwest Kentucky. This young gang's trophies were declared not Spanish by the elders upon return to Kentucky counsel. A similar story was told by other Shawnee to the 1770s surveyors at the Scioto village (Thomas Bullitt 1773 with Shawnees at Chillicothe. The now old Chief at the Mouth of the Kanawha explained why they passed beyond the western of the state to build their towns on the Scioto valley in western Ohio. This policy also applied to game taking in West Virginia.

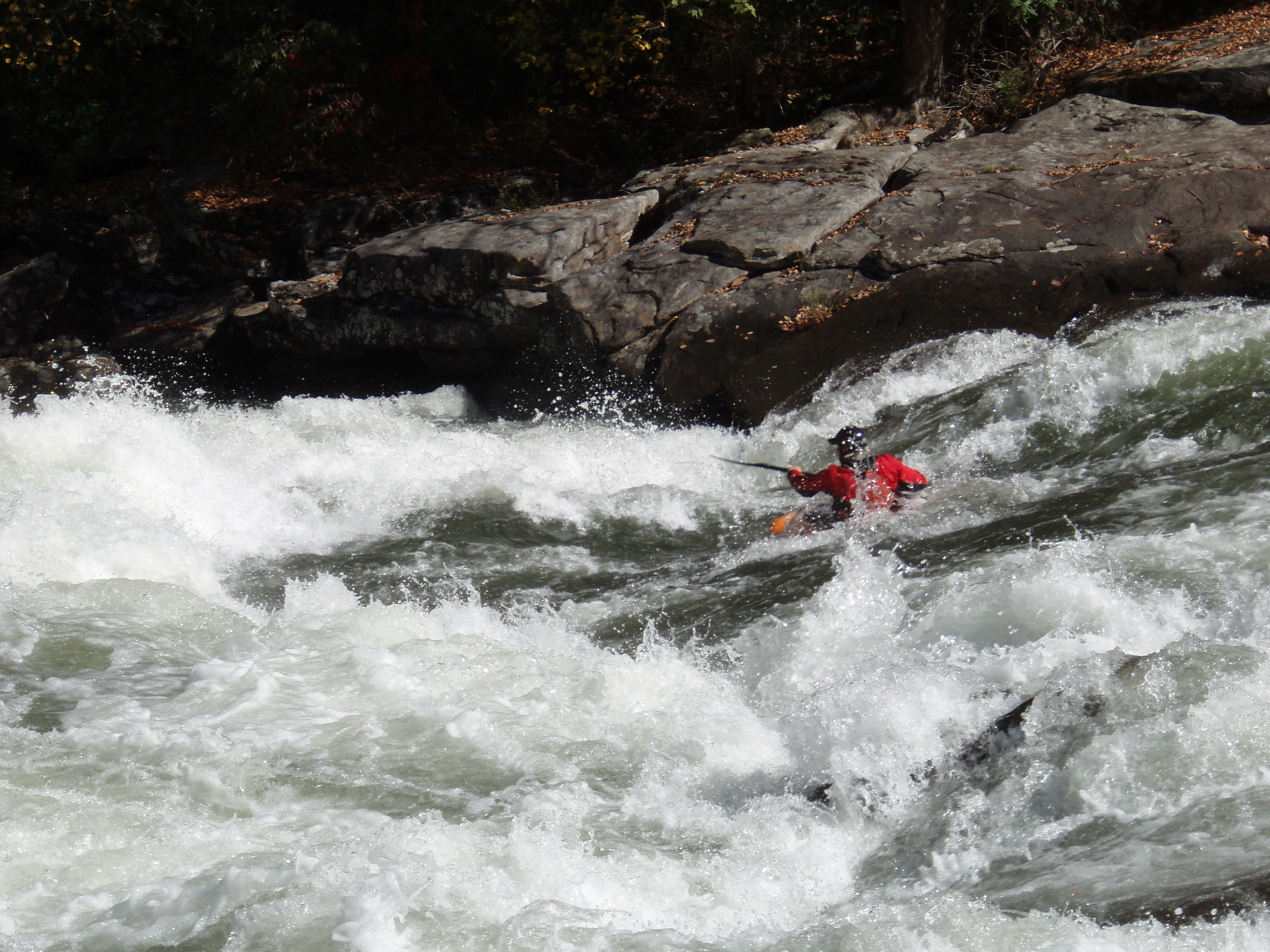
Upper Gauley River

Ouabano was a band of Mohicans or Eastern Lenape, like the others westerly of the state, who traded with the Spanish before the French arrival. It was Minsis and Mohican who led some Shawnee from Lower Ohio Valley in 1692 to join the Minisink villagers of the Delaware (Hanna 1911:158). Soon, these provided guides followed by the Viele of Albany Expedition. The Shawnee arrived later in the century by 1697 on the Eastern Panhandle with Sauvanoos from the south east colonies (Darlington; Hanna). Batts and Fallams, 1671, briefly mentions an abandoned Mohican village (Mohecan as transcribed journal entry date September 16, 1671, Summers 1929) on the Kanawha-New River area. Beginning in the late 18th century on modern maps, Big and Little Loup creeks are found opposite of Alloy bottom below the Kanawha Falls about three miles. It is about two miles upstream of Mt Carbon of Armstrong Creek with local ancient stone wall legends occasionally heard.

Delaware Chief Bull's old town, son of Teedyuscung, of Burnsville Lake Wildlife Management Area in Braxton County, dates from 1754 through 1772. They migrated to the White River, eighteen miles from the Wabash. Of these and colonial assimilation, there are still some descendants living in West Virginia

=== Iroquoian groups ===
The Iroquoian languages have a common historical and cultural origin, which later diverged to create different languages. Archaeological evidence shows that Iroquoian ancestors lived in the Finger Lakes and surrounding regions from at least 1000 CE. These languages include Mohawk, Huron-Wyandot, Neutral, Erie and Cherokee, among others. Members of the Haudenosaunee Confederacy (Seneca, Onondaga, Oneida, Cayuga and Mohawk) speak Iroquoian languages that are distinctly different from those of other Iroquoian speakers.

In 1649 the tribes constituting the Wendat (Huron) and Tionontati (Petun) confederations were displaced by war parties from the Haudenosaunee Confederacy. Many of the survivors went on to form the Wyandot people. The languages of the tribes that constituted these confederations were very poorly documented. These groups were called Atiwandaronk meaning 'they who understand the language' by the Huron, and thus are historically grouped with them. After becoming united in the League, the Haudenosaunee invaded the Ohio River Valley in present-day Kentucky to seek additional hunting grounds. One theory is that the Haudenosaunee had pushed tribes of the Ohio River valley, such as the Quapaw (Akansea) & Saponi, out of the region in a migration west of the Mississippi River by around 1200 CE; however Iroquoian peoples no longer held this land by the 17th century. Robert La Salle listed the Mosopelea among the Ohio Valley peoples defeated by the Haudenosaunee in the early 1670s, during the Beaver Wars. These Siouan-speaking groups had settled in the Midwest by 1673, establishing what became known as their historical territories. Just as the Siouan peoples were displaced by the Haudenosaunee, they displaced less powerful tribes whom they encountered in the Midwest, such as the Osage, who moved further west.

Iroquoian cultural was matrilineal, several families of girls and brothers from the same maternal lineage shared a longhouse. A married man moved into his wife's longhouse. Unlike the Haudenosaunee Confederacy of upstate New York, West Virginia saw no large centralized sovereign national governments of Native Americans. The extent of proto-Iroquoia and proto-Shanwan cultural and language in West Virginia was similar to the St. Lawrence Iroquoians' (Laurentian language). By the fourteenth century, a distinct St. Lawrence Iroquoian culture had created fortified villages and introduced corn to the St. Lawrence valley.

==== Susquehannock ====
The Susquesahanock on the Captain John Smith 1612 map

The Susquehannock (an Algonquian name meaning "people of the muddy river" adopted by the English of Maryland and Virginia) were known by a variety of ethnonyms such as the Andastes by the French (adapted from the Huron name Andastoerrhonon, meaning "people of the blackened ridge pole,) the Minquas by the Dutch and Swedes (adapted from the Lenape name for their traditional enemy, which meant "treacherous"), and the Conestogas by the English of Pennsylvania (adapted from Kanastoge or "place of the immersed pole", the name of a Susquehannock village in Pennsylvania), although their Iroquoian autonym is unknown. The Susquehannock were separated into two groups known as the White Minquas and the Black Minquas. The White Minquas were located in villages along the Susquehanna River and its tributaries from Pennsylvania to southern New York. The Black Minqua were located in the West Virginia (Grant, Hampshire and Hardy counties) and Maryland (Allegany County) areas that share the Potomac River as a border. They may have been part of the Erie people, and were bitter enemies of the Haudenosaunee Confederacy for control of the fur trade like their Erie and Huron allies. These tribes ought to have been centered east of the Kanawha River and held little land in what is now West Virginia.

==== Erie ====
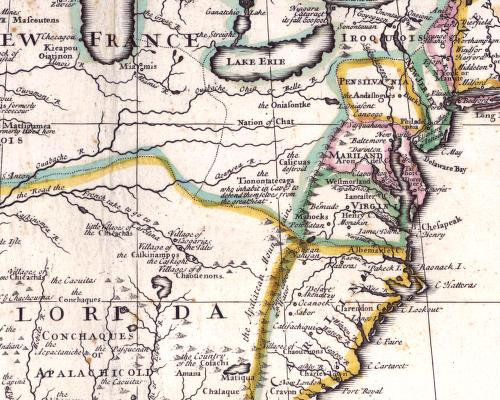
1710 French map showing location of Cat Nation

Erie populi is the earliest recognizable tribal grouping documented, including the northerly region "Riviere de la Ronceverte" of the state. The Huron Map of 1642 shows a river in the Allegheny Mountains delineating French territory from Virginian territory. Another map from 1657 by Francesco Bressani, titled Novae Franciae accurata delineatio, shows the same river of the French Canadien domain adjoining the Virginia domain below the mountain line.

The Erie people or Cat Nation (also known as the Nation de Chat, Rickohockans, and Rechahecrians) appear on Edward Bland's "Discovery of New Brittaine" map dated August 31, 1650, in the New River-Holston divide watershed region. Coming from beyond the Monetons, the Rickahockans or Ricahecrians entered Piedmont Virginia in 1656. This eastern Virginia Algonquian phrase referred to "from beyond the mountains." This groups has been identified in various ways, including as ancient Cherokee, as a Cat Nation division called Rique, and as "Riquehronnons" or "Rigueronnons".

==== Neutrals ====
The Chonnonton ("people of the deer", or "the people who tend or manage deer") were known as the Neutral Nation by the Europeans (first named so in 1615 by Samuel de Champlain because they were then at peace with the Haudenosaunee Confederacy and the Hurons) and the Attiwandaronk by the Hurons, meaning "people whose speech is awry or a little different". They were based in the Hamilton-Niagara district of southwestern Ontario and across the Niagara River in Western New York state but had trading and war alliances with many of the surrounding Iroquoian-speaking peoples including the Petun, Wendat (Huron), Wenro, Kakwa, Erie, Andasté, Massawomek and the Haudenosaunee Confederacy. During the early seventeenth century the Neutrals had reached a political sophistication previously unknown in this part of the country and may have even been a nascent chiefdom. This chiefdom consisted of ten tribes with a governing council united under a warrior-priest-chief named Tsouharissen ("Child of the Sun"). Like other groups, their adoption of maize agriculture had let them develop a large population. They were the largest native society in the area in the mid-seventeenth century and may have had a population as high as 40,000 with 4,000 to 6,000 warriors. Unlike other groups, they may have also begun to semi-domesticate white tail deer, as several early reports detail how they kept them in pens to manage them for the lucrative trade in fur and skins. The chiefdom failed in 1646 with the death of the Tsouharissen, and in 1651 the Haudenosaunee Confederacy were able to annihilate their old enemies. By 1671 they are no longer mentioned in the historical records.

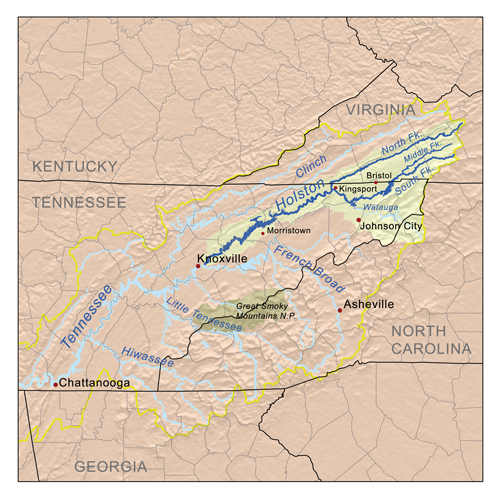
The Holston drainage basin, located within the upper Tennessee drainage basin

These early proto-Iroquoians were from an earlier Neutralia trade network south of the Huronian of the Canadien region south of Lake Erie. The Haudenosaunee League destroyed the Neutral Nation's trade network by 1653. The Rickohockans arrived in Virginia soon after this. Although both peoples, the Rickahockans and later Westo, were characterized as very aggressive and warring, they were thought to be expelled from Lake Erie by the Haudenosaunee League leaving an estimated 700 to 900 warriors to arrive in the early Virginia colonial trade area.

=== Siouan groups ===
Linguistic and historical records indicate a possible southern origin of Siouan peoples, with migrations over a thousand years ago from North Carolina and Virginia to Ohio. Some peoples continued down the Ohio River to the Mississippi River and up the Missouri River, and others across Ohio to Illinois, Wisconsin and Minnesota, home of the Dakota. Ohio Valley Siouan (Southeastern Siouan) is a group of related Siouan languages, which included the Ofo language, Biloxi language, and the Tutelo language. The Tutelo language was a group of mutually intelligible dialects spoken by the Tutelo, Monacan, Manahoac and Nahyssan confederacies, and Occaneechi in what is now Virginia and West Virginia.

==== Mosopelea ====
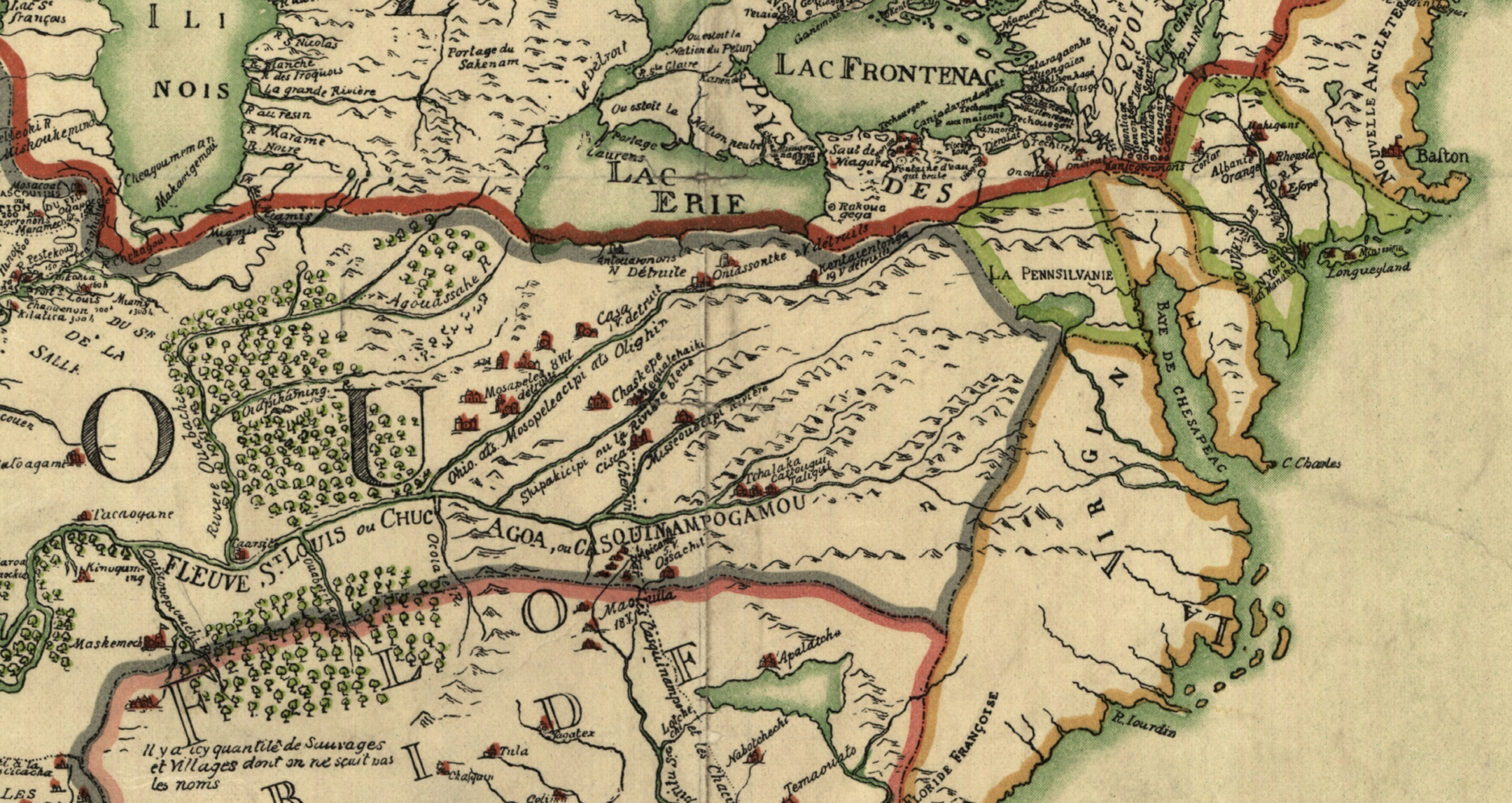
Franquelin 1684 map showing Mosopelea

Franquelin's map of 1684 shows tribal villages of eastern Siouan Mosopelea group, which had been destroyed on the central region Ohio River. On August 5, 1684, the New York Iroqouis were encouraged to take control of the Ohio Valley to establish New York trade from the lower half of the Ohio Valley with the French. The first documented Albany Trade began with the Vielle of Albany during the 1692–94 expedition. Virginians were already trading with groups in West Virginia at this point.

==== Mohetans ====
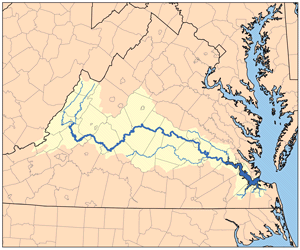
James River watershed of the Monacan leads to West Virginia

The Mohetans were the earliest Native American tribe reported by Virginians in central West Virginia. They are found during the Batts and Fallams' 1671 Expedition, and this expedition also found evidence that others colonists preceded them into the area. Earlier authors considered Mohetan to be a northernmost Mountain Cherokee; today, scholars consider them Eastern Siouan. A "Sepiny" Indian guide of the Sapony River returned to the expeditionary party and reported that he heard a drum and a gunshot towards the north, possibly the Greenbrier or Gauley River valleys. A Mohetan runner met the Virginian and Siouan group to discover whether they were planning to attack or not, and was given ammunition for his European gun. This was prior to Bacon's Rebellion, the Virginian farmer's uprising against Virginia tribes in 1676.

==== Monetons and Monecans ====
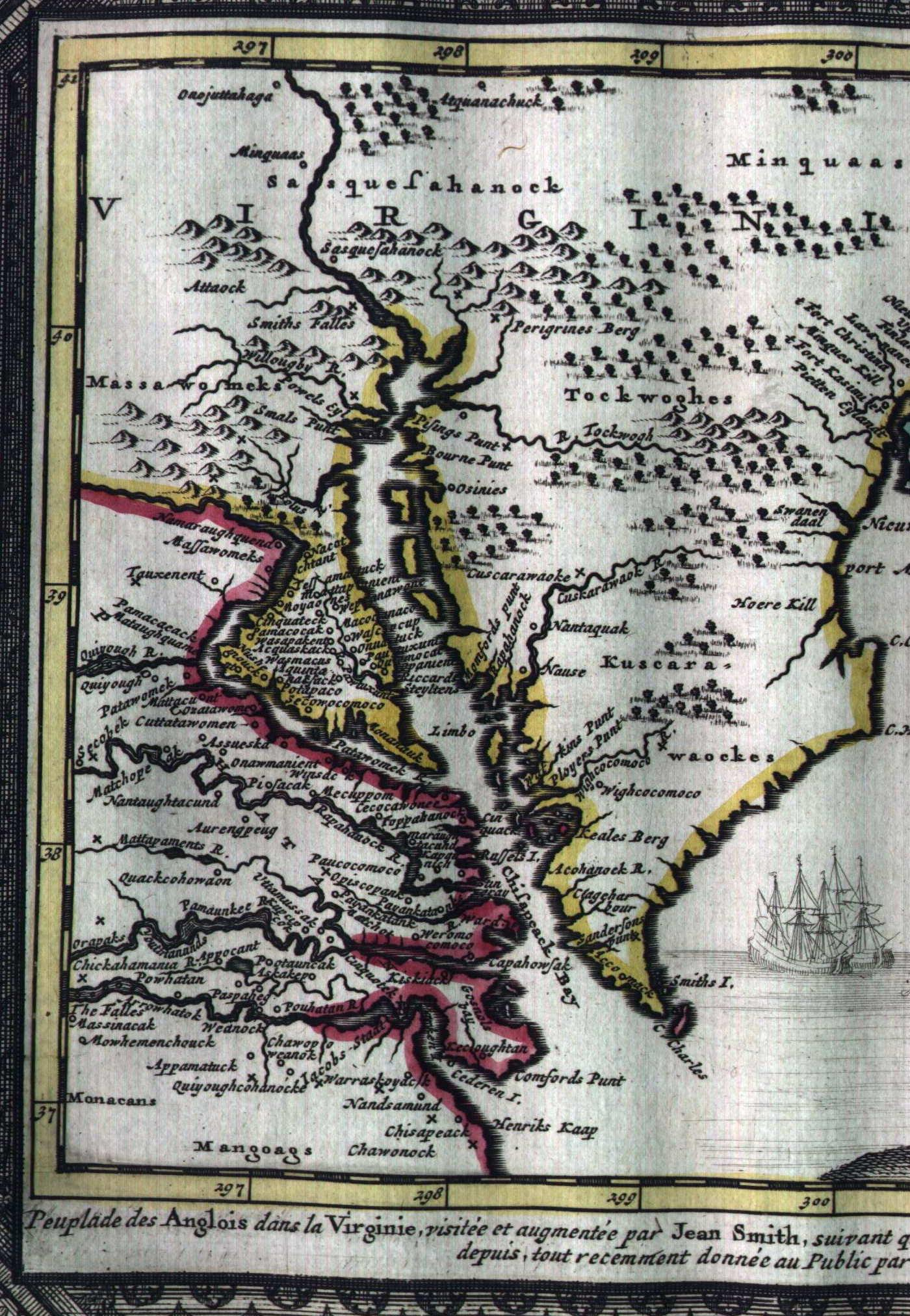
Susquesahanock and Monacan in 1707

Monetons traded with Tomahitans of Holston River Valley and adjoining lower Blue Ridge Mountains region. Today, there is a growing consensus that Monetons were Eastern Siouan and possibly a westerly branch of the Virginia Monacan, also known as the Manachee. However, this theory is moderated when looking at the archaeology of Eastern Tennessee of the Yuchi (Cisca) and the late Clover Phase of West Virginia (1550-1650), although the lingua franca or Virginia trade language, Occaneechi, is thought to be their primary language. This acculturated multi-tribe permitted others to live with them as subordinate Siouan Occaneechi.

From 800 to 900 CE, the latest Woodland hamlet farmers (i.e. Drew Tradition) were experiencing milder weather and the introduction of corn. Around 1250, just prior to the Woodland II period (1350–1607), the Monacan, or Algonquian called "Mandoag", were driven by enemies from the northwest into the Piedmont James River region of Virginia. There they found a hunter-gathering people who did not grow corn. Monacan legend reports that they taught the Doeg how to crop farm. The Doeg's language is similar to Piscataway or Nanticoke.

== Other historic groups ==
Many native groups other than the Algonquian, Iroquoians, and Siouans also inhabited this area. For example, the Occhenechees, also known as the Akenatzy, were the middle men in the regional trade network. Another group known as the Ocanahonon dressed like Europeans and carried curved swords at a village ten days west beyond the mountains by 1607. Ocanahonon archaeological sites excavated between the Great Lakes and the Gulf of Mexico in the Ohio Valley have been found with both gun and knife parts. Trade goods found here and in the greater "Riviere de la Ronceverte" were likely the result of intertribal contact.

=== Canaragay ===
The Canaragay lived near the New River (Kanawha River) watershed region in north-western North Carolina area. This southern Appalachian Mountain chain heads a number of rivers that drain directly to the Gulf of Mexico, directly to the Atlantic Ocean and the Ohio Valley thence to the Mississippi River, which drains to the Gulf of Mexico. The west slope of the divide has the Holston River. This area is now part of the Kingsport–Bristol (TN)–Bristol (VA) Metropolitan Statistical Area.

John Lederer, on behalf of the colonial governor of Virginia, Sir William Berkeley, made expeditions into the Appalachians in 1669 and 1670 reaching the mouth of the Kanawha River and reported no hostilities on the Kanawha Valley from the early "Cherokee People". He settled in western Maryland and made trips to the head waters of the Potomac area. The Iroquoian stock of the Virginias, Nottoway or Mangoac and allied Meherrin and remnant Susquehannock, calling themselves Chiroe^{n}haka, according to James Mooney. In the north, this linguistic grouping was called Mingo or Mengwe by the Dutch trade or New England Algonquian stock. John Lederer's guide was a Susquehannock on his journey to southwest Virginia and North Carolina, home of the Early Cherokee people.

=== Tomahittans ===
The Tomahitans developed from either the Yuchi or the Cherokee from eastern Tennessee. Both the Hernando de Soto Expedition in 1542 and the Captain Juan Pardo Expedition in 1568 made contact with the ancient Uchi, who were also referred to as the Chisca. In western North Carolina Hernando Moyano attacked and burned the Chisca village of Maniatique (Saltville, Virginia) on the upper Holston River near the New River watershed during the spring of 1567. Beginning in 1675, the Yamasee were regularly recorded by the Spanish of the missionary provinces of Guale (central Georgia coast) after being pushed to northeastern Florida from the Savannah River by the Westo. The Shawnee settled here. The Carolina Algonquians had lived in southern lower lands for nearly six hundred years. In 1727, a delegation of southern Cherokee, close neighbors of the Muscogee (Creek), visiting Charleston, South Carolina referred to the Tomahitans as old enemies of their allies the Yamasee of the Muskogean language.

=== Kanawha ===
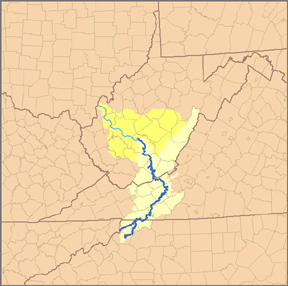
Kanawha-New River watershed.

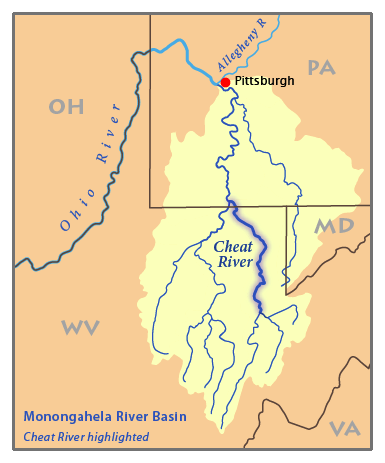
Monongahela drainage system, Cheat River highlighted.

Kanawha canoemen moved trade along the Ohio Valley and its tributaries of the Oniasantkeronons and Siouan, while Messawomeake moved trade from here across the Allegheny Mountains in the Earliest Historic period. Kaháwa means "boat" (canoe) in the local Iroquoian dialect. It varies with Iroquoian "kahôwö". Chief Cornstalk's Shawnese (Chalahgawtha) word for canoe was locally "Olagashe". Iroquoians (Tuscarora, Mingoe & Canawagh) call the anglicized Kanawha River "Ka(ih)nawáˀkye," meaning "waterway," and "kye" is an augmentive suffix. The ih and variant h, a string of moving water as to a stream, river. "Kényua" is a verb meaning to row a boat or to ferry someone across a stretch of water. The Canawagh (Kanawhas) were last reported as a band in 1774 in the St. Albans area (Hanson Journal) and reportedly joined other Haudenosaunee (Lewis) while some Kanawhan mixed with Shawnee moving to the Potomac near the trade posts.

The Haudenosaunee warned the French in 1669 that they would be threatened by the Andastes if they traveled down the Ohio River. The Maryland Accokeek Creek site (1300–1650 CE) is associated with the Piscataway people. For several centuries there were no archaeological sites of established Piscataway of the lower Potomac Valley in the Ohio Valley nor West Virginia. The Piscataway moved up to the Conoy Island in the Maryland region in 1699 after a long Siouan occupation. Later researchers declared that "Kanawha" was not Shawnee. The state does have Algonquian phrases, though these may be from Ouabano, Telegwa, or Makujay influence.

White traders began establishing trading houses in the Ohio, Allegheny, and Monongahela valleys in 1717, according to University of Pittsburgh's Historic Pittsburgh. Pennsylvania fur trader Michael Bezallion made a record of his trip from Illinois country up the Ohio en route to Philadelphia in 1717. The Haudenosaunee established a town at Kanaugha opposite the Mouth of the Kanawha before 1748, and the French constructed a fort nearby prior to the French and Indian War. James (Jacob) Le Tort, Sr. moved his Penn permit trading house of the 1720s and 1730s from the Allegheny's Beaver Creek fur trade area to near the Letart Falls by 1740. Céloron de Blainville, a French Canadian officer with a flotilla of canoes, encountered English traders with canoes nearby on August 12, 1749. Trade artifacts found in this area have dated from at least the seventeenth century.

Hudson's Trading Post Inn and canoe landing, a hunter's camp, village, and archaeological mound site, appeared on Madison's 1807 map opposite St. Albans. Colonial maps from this period depict the upper Ohio River as an extension of the Alleghany River along the West Virginia shores. A Delaware Indian legend of ancient time states that the Allegheny Indians were defeated and allowed to cross the Allegheny River to arrive on the east coast, which became their homeland.

=== Oniasantkeronons ===
The Oniasantkeronons are of probably of the Kanawha River area. The hills or mountains south of the Kanawha have been known by several names, including Waseoto, Osioto, Osiata, Oseoto, and Onosiota (La Posta). The ruins of a square fort at the mouth of Bull creek on the Coal River, thirty miles upstream of St. Albans on the Kanawha River has been recorded on maps of the area. Similarly to their trading party to the north known as the Rhiierrhonons, the Oniansantkeronons were scattered from northern Ohio prior to the Mohawk invasion. The Hoñniasontke'roñnons laid down river from the Oniasantkeronons and migrated easterly toward the Monacan sometime after 1699 near Salem, Virginia.

Cartographer John Wallis mapped the Scioto River in 1783, recording the river as the Sikoder R and noting the Lower Shanaois village at its mouth. Franquelin's map of 1684 shows tribal villages in the central Ohio River region of eastern Sioux, including the Mosopelea. On August 5, 1684, the New York Iroqouis were encouraged to take control of the Ohio Valley to establish New York trade from the lower half of the Ohio Valley with the French. The first documented Albany Trade began with the Vielle of Albany during the 1692–94 expedition. At this point, Virginians were already trading with native groups in West Virginia.

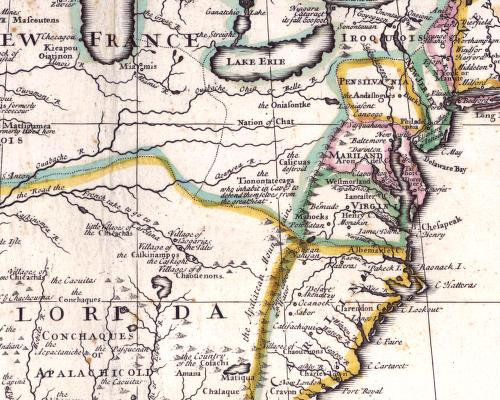
French Map Ca. 1710

The Sussquahana and Sinaicus destroyed the Black Mincquaas.

=== Calicuas ===
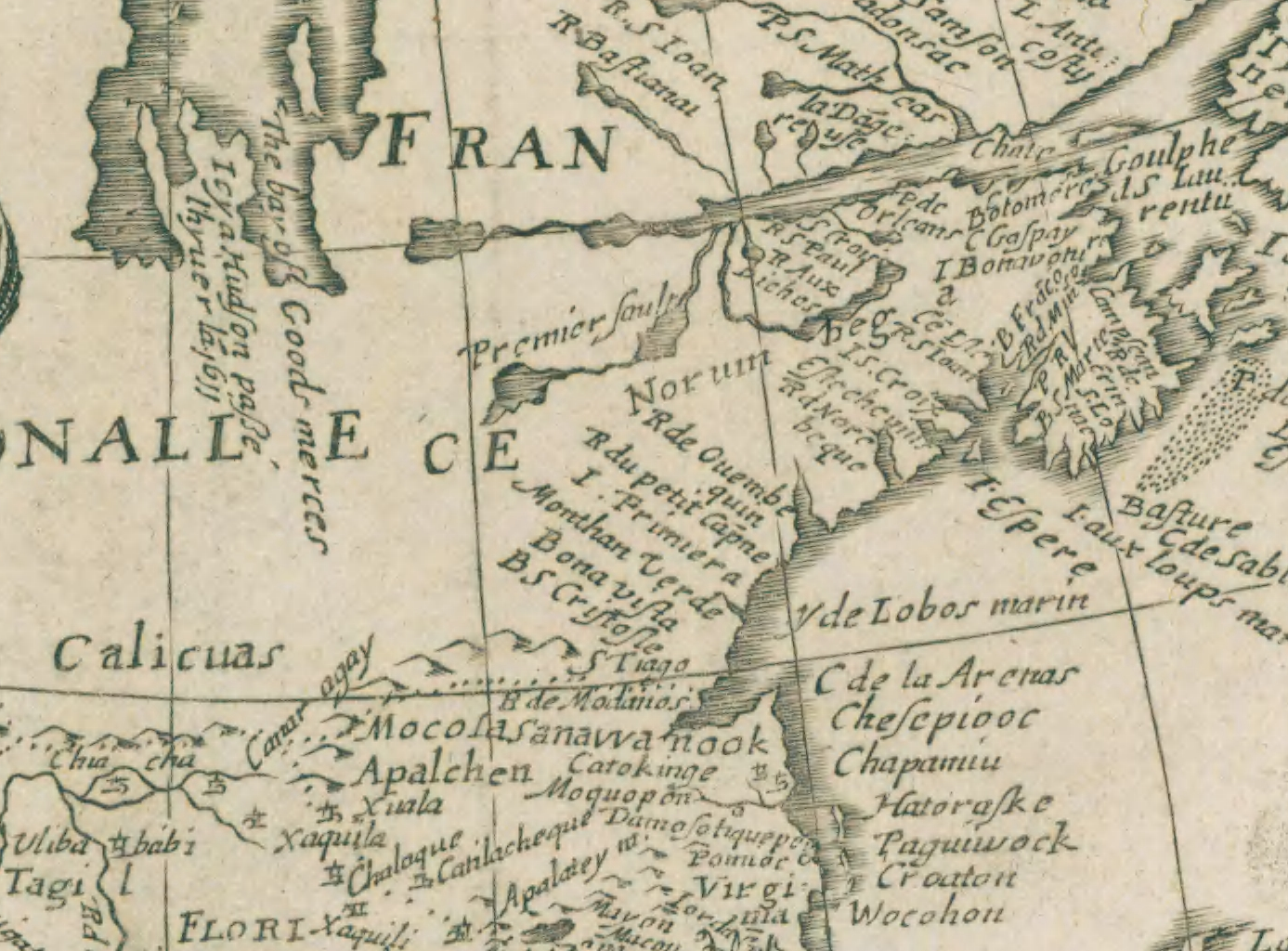
Clip from 1671 French map

The Calicua migrated east to the upper Potomac River trade area, but the tribe was later destroyed and absorbed into other tribes. The earliest location of the Calicuas is depicted as a province north of the Chisca (Uchi) and Appalachians according to the Narrative of De Soto's expedition in 1540–1541. Calicuas is found on Ortelius's 1570 map and 1642 on the Blaeuw map. The next map by Merian was issued about 1650 now with more correct geography showing the Calicuas along the general area of West Virginia. The Guyandottes appeared in southwestern West Virginia and southern Ohio around this time, pushing out from the Acansea (Ohio) Valley the Calicua and Mosopelea (Ohio Ofo) peoples according to the progressing of contemporary maps.

This era is sometimes called a fire-side cabin culture, which is associated with eighteenth-century hunters. Historical trader Charles Poke's trading post dates from 1731 with these "Trade Indians", then called Cherokee, stemming from this earlier period called Cherokee Falls. The Calicua were reported on the Tygart Valley River and Cheat River region in 1705 and 1707, which are supported by several contemporary maps. Fort Lyttelton and Fort Shirley were built in 1755–56 by the fur trader and Indian agent George Croghan. Colonel Andrew Lewis had roughly estimated sixty Virginia Cherokee with him on the Big Sandy Expedition to this area in 1756.

=== Wyandots ===
The ancestors of the Wyandots were part of extensive trade networks along the easterly regional tributaries of Lake Erie and they were generally traditional Haudenosaunee enemies. They lived in three large confederacies the Neutral confederacy, the Wendat confederacy and the Tionontate confederacy. A material culture possibly linked to the Erie was named for Charles Whittlesey, a nineteenth-century geologist and archaeologist who began the studies of the Whittlesey Culture (1000 to 1600) and founded the Western Reserve Historical Society of Ohio. Other material cultures include Fort Ancient, where beans were present at least 1150–1200. Neighboring to the west along Lake Erie's tributaries were the palisaded villages of the Sandusky culture (1400–1500). Other Late Woodland peoples were south of the Sandusky culture and southwest of the Whittlesey culture on the rolling hill watershed of these tributaries in Ohio. The connection of these various material cultures with historic nations is disputed due to migrations (Ohio Historical Society).

In the 1600s, Tsouharissen became the leader of the Neutral confederacy. French Recollet friar Daillon in 1626 reported three large deer pens near his village, Ounontisaston. They called themselves Chonnonton, or "people of the deer." Due to the confederacy being at peace with the Haudenosaunee and the Wendat Confederacy, in 1615 Champlain called them, "la Nation neutre." They traded deer hides and byproducts as far south as the Powhatan confederacy on Chesapeake Bay for the prized Snow Whelk (Buccinidae) marine shells. From 1649 to 1651, the Haudenosaunee destroyed the Neutral, Wendat and Tionontate Confederacies. The people who refused to assimilate into the Haudenosaunee fled and were pushed south. There they mixed with the local people of the Ohio region and they are now called Wyandots. The Guyandotte River was named in their memory.

It cannot be understated, however, that the Wyandots, or Guyandotte, of West Virginia came to be extremely far from the Ohio Wyandot over time & may have been operating as a separate polity. It's possible that they may be the Kentatentonga mentioned on Franquelin's map, with a whopping 19 villages in northwest Pennsylvania having been destroyed.

=== Shenandoah ===
Several historic references speak of a separate tribe living in the Shenandoah River Valley along West Virginia's eastern border known as the Senandoa, or Shenandoah, until approximately 1715. It is during this time that they were allegedly destroyed by the Catawba—the most likely scenario being that they sided the Yuchi during the Yamasee War, whereas the Catawbas of North Carolina backed the Yamasee. They appear to have been mound builders, and so may have been associated with the Monongahela Culture to the northwest, who were the only mound building society surviving in the region by that time. While confusion still remains as to whether they could have been associated with the Haudenosaunee, Algonquians or Siouans, they may have, in fact, been a separate tribe from other known groups who passed through the region during the 17th century. They seem to share little to no cultural traits with their Saponi neighbors. Many make a point that the place has been largely forgotten and rarely explored by Archaeologists, warranting a closer look.

It's difficult to say what happened to the remaining Senandoa. They may have merged with the Yuchi. Some may have also gone to live among the Saponi to the east, who appear to have remained neutral in the Yamasee War & were being collectively referred to as the Christannas at the time. In the 1883 paper "Tutelo Tribe and Language," Horatio Hale met with the last full-blooded Tutelo living among the Haudenosaunee Confederacy in Canada, Waskiteng/ Nakonha. The man claims that he was 106, remembered times before the American Revolution & claimed that his people's village in New York was referred to as Tutelo, but was made up of a mixture of "Tutelos, Saponis & Botshenins." Although it is assumed that Botshenin may be a nickname for Occaneechi (The three tribes were all Christannas & were a core group who stuck close to one another throughout the 18th century), no one has yet seemed to identify this tribe who they are for certain.

== Trade ==
=== Spanish and French trade ===
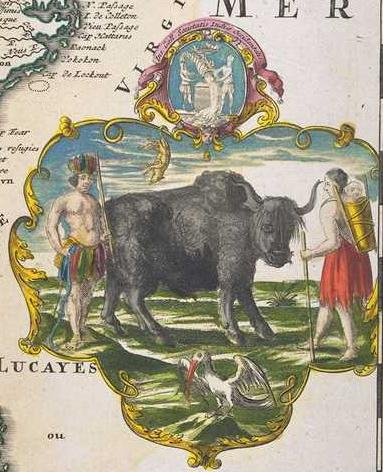
Perhaps the only contemporary "painting" of the extinct Eastern Forest Buffalo on map from 1687. Notice the horn representation.

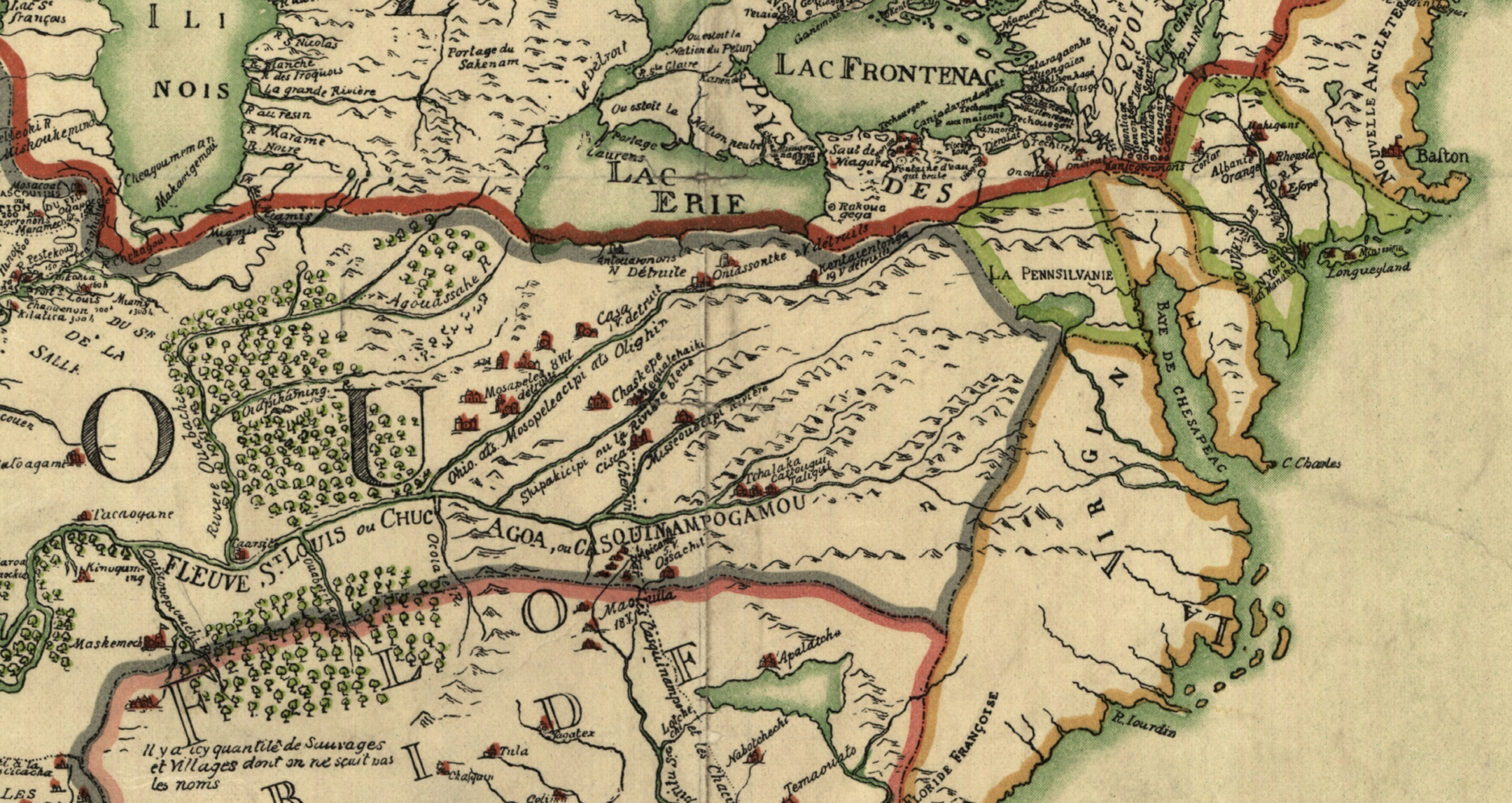
LaSalle sailed to France in November 1683 accompanied by Franquelin who created the map in 1684.

In the northern part of Chickasaw country below the confluence of the Wabash and Ohio area of the Chaouanons, Jolliet and Marquette met a band of Iroquoian origin in 1673, which they identified as either Tuscarora or Cherokee. They were reported as trading with the Spanish to the east and had firearms. The French explorers were above the thirty third latitude, in the northern Spanish trade country. John Peter Salley passed through this region describing the Ohio Falls area as a Spanish Manor, beginning on the Kanawha River in 1742. The wild cattle are often assumed to be a smaller subspecies of the Eastern Forest Buffalo, which is now extinct. The last buffalo seen and killed in West Virginia killed in Boone county in 1826.

Above the neck of the Potomac, Augustin Herrman charted a map from 1659 to 1670, which shows the unidentified major branching rivers leading into the Allegheny Mountains. These rivers on the map lead into the eastern valleys of West Virginia to the Greenbrier area divide. His explorer parties evidently did not pass through the gaps of the Monongahela National Forest.

Documenting early United States history for the Nation's centennial became a popular subject of historians by 1876. Early settlers plowing the fields of Old Town Creek near the Mouth of the Kanawha found more than eighty gun barrels collectively. These settlers also found an anvil, hammers and other evidence of blacksmith ware nearly two centuries after they were distributed in the archaeological records. Before formal archaeological records, locals disinterred tomahawks, pewter basins, and other artifacts from area mound formations.

The Neutral Nation formed a league of eight hundred Upper Algonquians in 1653. This league was located southwest of Skenchioe, near a Fox village in the Flat Country of The Thumb, Michigan. The Cat Nation Neighbored the Upper Algonquians to the east and scattered around the southern shore of Lake Erie. From the other direction, kindred Kentaientonga villages were destroyed by Haudenosaunee as they told to the French years afterward. At Le Chine in 1669 at Montreal Island, La Salle was told to expect to find Chaouanon (Algonquian) and Honniasontkeronon (Haudenosaunee) villages on the Ohio above the falls or above Louisville, Kentucky. Exploration information was seldom shared between different European nations. The Andasté (Chiroe^{n}haka) found on maps as Calicuas territory impeded the New York Haudenosaunee and the French Canadien trade in this region at the time.

=== New York trade ===
Trade between New York and the Ohio Valley region began around 1692–94, though trade between the Ohio Valley area and Fort Henry (Virginia) began at least two decades earlier. Archaeological evidence also indicates that intertribal trade included Europeans began long before this. Under the name Chaskepe in 1683, some Cisca seem to have joined with the Shawnee who relocate to Fort St. Louis in Illinois and lived among the French trade (Hanna).

Nearly a century later, local stories were still being told of this period of warring and trade establishment. George Washington was about fifteen miles below Wheeling, Marshall County according to his entry on Thursday October 25, 1770. An early Cut Creek Indian town was wiped out on Cut Creek (Fish Creek) by the Six Nations (Haudenosaunee) according to the hired Crawford Indians (William Crawford (soldier) Iroquois-like George Ck neighbors) and the two Croghan Indians aboard with him from White Mingos Castle. These western Virginia Indians explained the geography of each stream they passed on the Ohio River to and up the Great Kanawha. With some of the hired Indians, George Washington spent the night of November 2, 1770 at the old hunters camp at the 10 Mile Creek before returning to the main camp at the Mouth of the Kanawha. A few days before, he and some of the expedition party hunted through Old Town Creek area near the Old Shawnatown.

=== Virginia trade ===
The Susquesahannock spoke an Iroquoian dialect and were fort builders. They were allies with the Wendat Confederacy. A Susquesahannock site is located in the Eastern Panhandle at Moorefield, West Virginia. Captain John Smith 1612 map.

Trade from the Allegheny Mountains region began with Jamestown, Virginia. In the 1999 Interim Report, the Massawomeck offered gifts of bows and arrows, deer and bear flesh, fish, clubs, and bear skins to John Smith during his Chesapeake Bay exploration in 1608. Next, the Susquesahanock came down and presented venison, tobacco pipes, baskets, targets, bows and arrows. A large cache of small and very well made dark flint Levanna, and small excellently proportioned Madison arrow points appear to be from some of these trade or gifts at the Jamestown archaeological site.

In the early seventeenth century, a situation of Messawomeake, from beyond the western slopes of the upper Allegheny Mountains, migration to the upper Potomac area for the sake of being closer to English trade ware appears. This was battling circumstances with the Iroquois Trade middlemen, the Algonquian Nacotchtank in 1632. Leaving French Canadian trade, they arrived and began trade with Captain Henry Fleet on the upper Chesapeake Bay. Messawomeake settled northerly tributaries of the upper Potomac Valley. It appears a period of general peace followed with the Algonquian down the Potomac.

In the 1640s, the Virginia Colony built Fort Henry and traded with the eastern Siouan of proto-historic West Virginia. A fort built of particular protohistoric interest was the James River Fort of William Byrd I established in 1676. It was still closer to Tutelo groups, elemental Swanton's Toteras of interest, and its nearby Monacan east of Roanoke area and Kanawhan Monetons following Wood's 1674 contact. Monecaga were a westerly subset of Monacan. According to John Lederer, The Monacan had been driven by enemies from the northwest into James River and Blue Ridge Mountains region of Virginia around 1250. There they found a hunter-gatherer people who did not grow corn. Along with Shattera, these were among the Occane-Uchi Virginia trade through the south of the state.
