= Moneton =

Historical Native American tribe from West Virginia

Total population
- Extinct

Regions with significant populations
- West Virginia, Virginia, North Carolina

Languages
- Moneton language

Religion
- Indigenous religion

Related ethnic groups
- possibly Manahoac, Monacan, Shawnee and Massawomeck

The Moneton were a historical Native American tribe from West Virginia. In the late 17th century, they lived in the Kanawha Valley near the Kanawha and New Rivers.

== Name ==
Their name translates to "Big Water" people.

== Territory ==
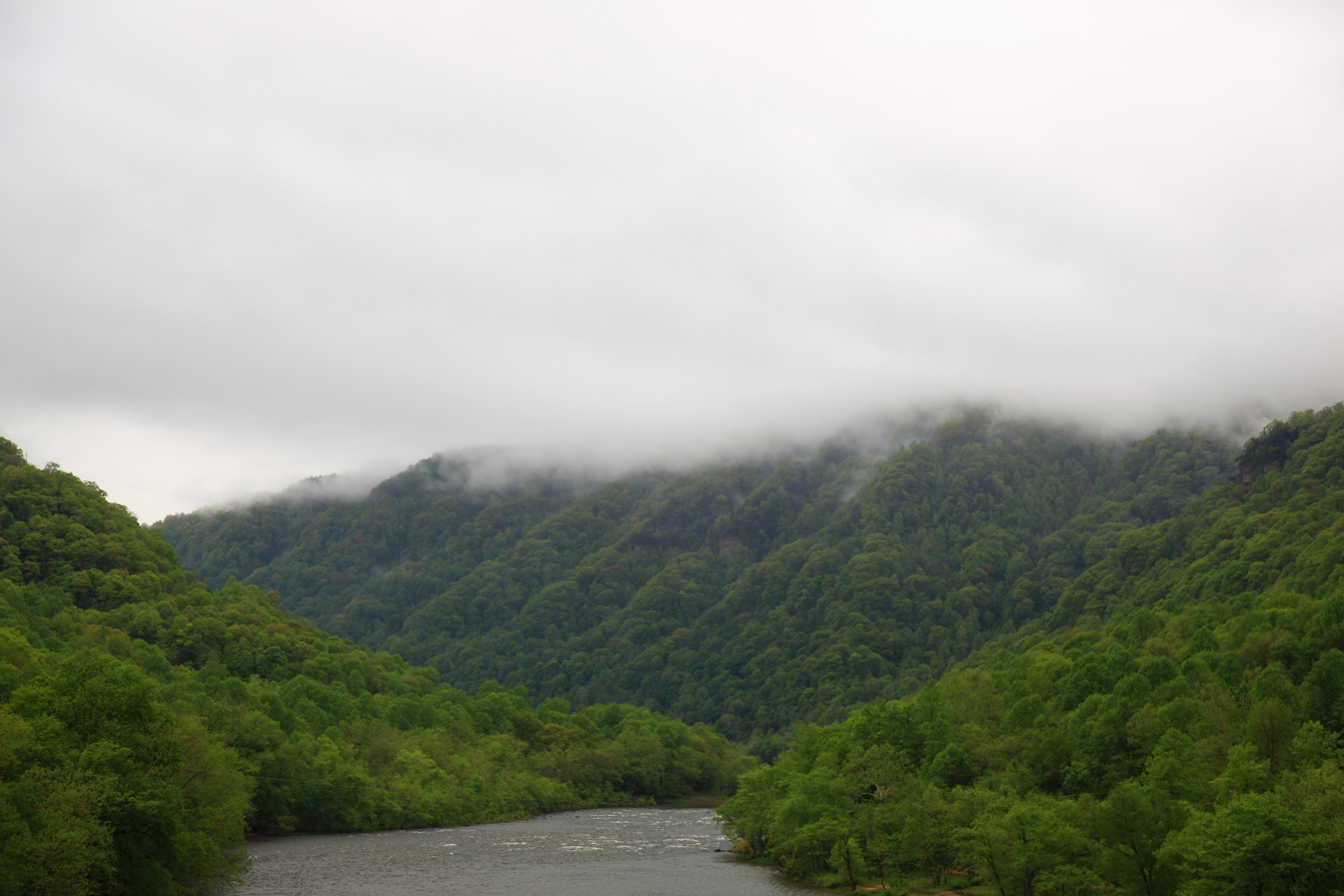
New River, a tributary of the Kanawha River, in West Virginia

The Moneton lived in southern West Virginia, along the Kanawha River. Their settlements were west of the Manahoac and Tutelo nations.

== History ==
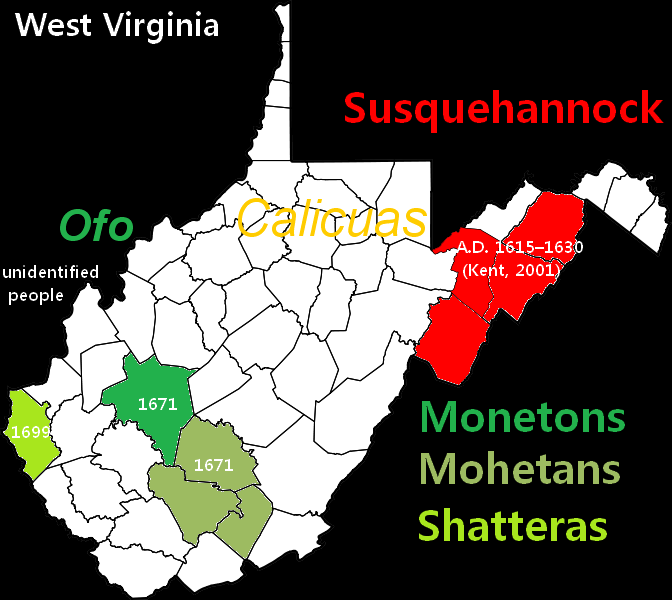
Locations of Shatteras, Monetons, Mohetans, and Conestoga (Susquehannocks) archeological sites in West Virginia. (Brashler 1987; Kent 2001)

The Moneton may have been a Fort Ancient culture, an Indigenous culture that thrived from 1000 to 1750 CE in the Ohio River Valley. They might have been related to the Shawnee, an Algonquian-speaking people.

The first written mention of the Moneton was made by English settler Thomas Batts in 1671.

In 1674, English colonist Abraham Wood sent his servant Gabriel Arthur from Fort Henry near Appomattox, Virginia to visit local tribes to expand the fur trade. Wood visited them and described their capital as "a great town," That is the last contemporary mention of them.

They were likely forced to merge into other nations in the Piedmont region of Virginia due to colonialism. American ethnohistorian Isaac J. Emrick argues that the Moneton likely merged into the Shawnee in the 17th century.

== Language ==
Moneton
- Moheton
- Native to: United States
- Region: West Virginia
- Ethnicity: Moneton
- Language family: Unclassified (Ohio Valley Siouan? Algonquian?)

Language codes
- ISO 639-3: None (mis)
- Glottolog: None

The Moneton language is completely unattested and unclassified. Some argued it is a Siouan language thus likely related to the Tutelo and Ofo languages. Others argue that the language is Algonquian appealing to close ties to Fort Ancient peoples such as the Shawnee and Massawomeck.

== See also ==
- History of West Virginia
- Fort Ancient
- Prehistory of West Virginia
- Protohistory of West Virginia
- West Virginia Waterways
