= Siouan languages =

Language family of North America

Siouan
- Siouan–Catawban
- Geographic distribution: central North America
- Linguistic classification: One of the world's primary language families
- Subdivisions: Catawban (Eastern); Siouan proper (Western)

Language codes
- ISO 639-2 / 5: sio
- Glottolog: siou1252
- Linguasphere: 64-A
- Distribution of the Siouan–Catawban languages sometime around 1750

Siouan (/ˈsuːən/ SOO-ən), also known as Siouan–Catawban (/ˌsuːən kəˈtɔːbən/ SOO-ən kə-TAW-bən), is a language family of North America located primarily in the Great Plains, Ohio and Mississippi valleys and southeastern North America with a few other languages in the east.

== Name ==
Authors who call the entire family Siouan distinguish the two branches as Western Siouan and Eastern Siouan or as "Siouan-proper" and "Catawban". Others restrict the name "Siouan" to the western branch and use the name Siouan–Catawban for the entire family. Generally, however, the name "Siouan" is used without distinction.

== Family division ==
The Siouan family consists of some 20 languages and various dialects:

- Siouan
  - Western Siouan
    - Mandan † ongoing revival, MHA project
      - Nuptare
      - Nuetare
    - Missouri River Siouan (a.k.a. Crow–Hidatsa)
      - Crow (a.k.a. Absaroka, Apsaroka, Apsaalooke, Upsaroka) – 3,500 speakers
      - Hidatsa (a.k.a. Minitari, Minnetaree) – 200 speakers
    - Mississippi Valley Siouan (a.k.a. Central Siouan)
      - Mitchigamea? †
      - Dakotan (a.k.a. Sioux–Assiniboine–Stoney)
        - Nakoda
          - Assiniboine – 150 speakers
          - Stoney – 930 speakers
        - Sioux – 13,100 speakers
          - Lakota – 10,000 speakers (~2,000 L1, ~8,000 L2)
          - Dakota (sometimes classified as Western and Eastern Dakota) – 3,100 speakers (~100 L1, ~3,000 L2)
      - Chiwere-Winnebago
        - Chiwere †
        - Ho-Chunk – 250 speakers
      - Dhegihan
        - Omaha–Ponca – 85 speakers
        - Kansa-Osage
          - Kansa †
          - Osage †, on ongoing revival
        - Quapaw †
    - Ohio Valley Siouan
      - Virginia Siouan
        - Tutelo †
        - Moneton †
      - Mississippi Siouan
        - Biloxi †
        - Ofo †
  - Eastern Siouan/Catawban
    - Catawba †
    - Woccon †

(†) – Extinct language

Siouan languages can be grouped into Western Siouan languages and Catawban.

The Western Siouan languages are typically subdivided into Missouri River languages (such as Crow and Hidatsa), Mandan, Mississippi River languages (such as Dakota, Chiwere-Ho-Chunk, and Dhegihan languages), and Ohio Valley Siouan languages (Ofo, Biloxi, and Tutelo). The Catawban branch consists of Catawban and Woccon.

Charles F. Voegelin established, on the basis of linguistic evidence, that Catawban was divergent enough from the other Siouan languages, including neighboring Siouan languages of the Piedmont and Appalachia, to be considered a distinct branch. Voegelin proposes that Biloxi, Ofo and Tutelo constitute one group which he terms Ohio Valley Siouan. This group includes various historical languages spoken by Siouan peoples not only in the Ohio River Valley, but across the Appalachian Plateau and into the Piedmont regions of present-day Virginia and the Carolinas. Some of these groups migrated or were displaced great distances following European contact, ending up as far afield as present-day Ontario and southern Mississippi. Collectively, Siouan languages of Appalachia and the Piedmont are sometimes grouped under the term Tutelo or Yesah (Yesa:sahį).

== Proto-Siouan ==
Proto-Siouan is the reconstructed ancestor of all modern Siouan languages.

=== Previous proposals ===
There is a certain amount of comparative work in Siouan–Catawban languages. Hans Wolff's 1950 article is among the first and more complete works on the subject. Wolff reconstructed the system of proto-Siouan, and this was modified by Matthews (1958). The latter's system is shown below:

	Labial	Alveolar	Palatal	Velar	Glottal
Nasal	*m	*n			
Plosive	*p	*t		*k	*ʔ
Fricative		*s	*ʃ	*x	*h
Approximant	*w	*r	*j		

With respect to vowels, five oral vowels are reconstructed: /*i, *e, *a, *o, *u/ and three nasal vowels /*ĩ, *ã, *ũ/. Wolff also reconstructed some consonantal clusters /*tk, *kʃ, *ʃk, *sp/.

=== Current proposal ===
Collaborative work involving a number of Siouanists started at the 1984 Comparative Siouan Workshop at the University of Colorado with the goal of creating a comparative Siouan dictionary that would include Proto-Siouan reconstructions. This work yielded a different analysis of the phonemic system of Proto-Siouan, which appears below:

==== Consonants ====
		Labial	Alveolar	Palatal	Velar	Glottal
Plosive	tenuis	*p	*t		*k	*ʔ
Plosive	ejective	*pʼ	*tʼ		*kʼ	
Plosive	preasp.	*ʰp	*ʰt		*ʰk	
Plosive	aspirated	*pʰ	*tʰ		*kʰ	
Fricative	tenuis		*s	*ʃ	*x	*h
Fricative	ejective		*sʼ	*ʃʼ	*xʼ	
Sonorant	plain	*w	*r	*j		
Sonorant	"funny"	*W	*R			

- The "funny" sonorants pattern like obstruents. Their exact nature is unknown; proposals include e.g.
  - voiced plosives [b d]
  - prenasalized plosives [ᵐb ⁿd]

In Siouanist literature (e.g., Rankin et al. 2015), Americanist phonetic transcriptions are the norm, so IPA *ʃ is Americanist *š, IPA *j is Americanist *y, and so on.

The major change to the previously-proposed system was accomplished by systematically accounting for the distribution of multiple stop series in modern Siouan languages by tracing them back to multiple stop series in the proto-language. Previous analysis posited only a single stop series.

Many of the consonant clusters proposed by Wolff (1950–1951) can be accounted for due to syncopation of short vowels before stressed syllables. For example, Matthews (1958: 129) gives *wróke as the proto-form for 'male.' With added data from a larger set of Siouan languages since the middle of the twentieth century, Rankin et al. give *waroː(-ka) as the reconstructed form for 'male.'

Unlike Wolff and Matthews' proposals, there are no posited nasal consonants in Proto-Siouan. Nasal consonants only arise in daughter languages when followed by a nasal vowel. In addition, there is a set of sounds that represent obstruentized versions of their corresponding sonorants. These sounds have different reflexes in daughter languages, with *w appearing as [w] or [m] in most daughter languages, while *W has a reflex of [w], [b], [mb], or [p]. The actual phonetic value of these obstruents is an issue of some debate, with some arguing that they arise through geminated *w+*w or *r+*r sequences or a laryngeal plus *w or *r.

==== Vowels ====
Previous work on Proto-Siouan only posited single vowel length. However, phonemic vowel length exists in several Siouan languages such as Hidatsa, Ho-Chunk, and Tutelo. Rankin et al. analyze numerous instances of long vowels as present due to common inheritance rather than common innovation. The five oral vowels and three nasal vowels posited by earlier scholars is expanded to include a distinction between short and long vowels. The proposed Proto-Siouan vowel system appears below:

		Front		Central		Back	
		short	long	short	long	short	long
Close	oral	*i	*iː			*u	*uː
Close	nasal	*ĩ	*ĩː			*ũ	*ũː
Mid		*e	*eː			*o	*oː
Open	oral			*a	*aː		
Open	nasal			*ã	*ãː		

== Potential external relationships ==
=== Yuchi ===
The Yuchi language, once spoken around the Upper Tennessee Valley before the Yuchis were displaced, is traditionally considered a language isolate, but the relationship between Yuchi and the Siouan languages has long been debated. The Yuchi and Catawba peoples, as well as some other Siouan-speaking peoples, shared a geographic area in the Eastern United States for a significant period prior to the exploration and colonization of the region by Europeans which began in the early 16th century. The first arguments for the linguistic relationship came from Edward Sapir in 1929, based on a relatively small number of supposed cognates. In 1998, Robert L. Rankin also evaluated the relationship, focusing on morphological resemblances. Although he had previously described the languages' vocabularies as "utterly alien to one another", Rankin found the morphological evidence extremely compelling, particularly in irregular verbal paradigms, and believed the languages were likely related.

Arguments in favor of the relationship have focused on lexical and morphological similarities. For example, if the languages are unrelated, noun classes found in both are unusually similar, including the Siouan animate non-human prefix *wi- and its Yuchi analog we- and the Siouan impersonal human marker *ko- and Yuchi go-. Another argument in favor of the relationship is that, like the Siouan languages, Yuchi exhibits fricative-graded sound symbolism. Examples in Yuchi include 'ispi ('black') as compared to 'išpi ('dirty') and čʰaɬa ('pink') as compared to tsʰaɬa ('red'). Likewise, Yuchi exhibits a similar ablauting to the Siouan languages, including the use of the final nasal vowel to mark the future tense, similar to its use in Lakota. A relationship between the Siouan languages and Yuchi is among the more accepted proposals among Siouanists. If the languages are related, new models suggest that Yuchi could be a second branch of the Catawban subfamily, rather than a third branch of the larger Siouan–Catawban family.

=== Macro-Siouan ===
Among the first to propose a larger relationship between Siouan and other indigenous languages of the Americas was Robert Latham, an English ethnologist, who first attempted to link the Siouan languages with the Iroquoian languages in 1856, though he also suspected that Catawba, Cherokee, Choctaw, and Caddo may also be distantly related. After researching several of the treaties signed by the Cayuga, Lewis H. Morgan came to believe that the Iroquoian languages were descended from the Dakotan languages, formally proposing the link in 1871. Neither of these approaches, however, enjoyed widespread acceptance; they were built on shaky data and small sets of comparanda.

Sapir's 1929 proposal to link Yuchi to the Siouan languages did not stop there; he proposed what he called the "Hokan–Siouan languages", now known as "Macro-Siouan", comprising the Siouan–Catawban, Iroquoian, Caddoan, and Muskogean languages, along with several isolates including Natchez, Tunica, and others. Similarly, his student Mary Haas attempted to link the putative Gulf languages – comprising the Muskogean languages, Natchez, Tunica, Chitimacha, and Atakapa – with the Siouan and the Algonquian languages in the 1950s. This hypothesis, however, does not have widespread support among linguists.

== Phonology ==
- Languages of the Siouan family exhibit significant phonological variation: compare e.g. the consonant inventories of
  - Dakota, with 30 phonemes contrasting tenuis /t s/, ejective /tʼ sʼ/, aspirated /tʰ/ and voiced /d z/ obstruents;
  - Crow, with 10 phonemes subject to an unusually high degree of allophony /n ~ d ~ ɾ ~ l/.

== Sources ==
- Campbell, Lyle (1997). American Indian Languages: The Historical Linguistics of Native America. Oxford Studies in Anthropological Linguistics. Vol. 4. Oxford University Press. ISBN 978-0-19-509427-5.
- Chafe, Wallace L. (1976). The Caddoan, Iroquoian, and Siouan Languages. De Gruyter. doi:10.1515/9783110804669. ISBN 978-90-279-3443-7.
- Coen, Noah Michael (2021). "(Para-)Adpositional Morphosyntax in Siouan: A Case Study of Lakhota-Dakota-Nakota, Catawba, and Crow". In Kasak, Ryan M.; Rudin, Catherine; Mirzayan, Armik; Dutta, Samiron (eds.). Proceedings of the 41st Siouan and Caddoan Languages Conference. Siouan and Caddoan Languages Conference. Norman, Oklahoma. pp. 13–58. ISSN 2641-9904.
- Kasak, Ryan M. (2024). A Grammar of Mandan. Comprehensive Grammar Library. Vol. 10. Berlin: Language Science Press. ISBN 978-3-96110-495-6. ISSN 2749-7798.
- Mirzayan, Armik (2023). "56. Sketch of the Siouan Language Family". In Dagostino, Carmen; Mithun, Marianne; Rice, Keren (eds.). The Languages and Linguistics of Indigenous North America: A Comprehensive Guide, Volume 2. The World of Linguistics. Vol. 13.2. De Gruyter. pp. 1447–1518. doi:10.1515/9783110712742. ISBN 978-3-11-071274-2.
- Rankin, Robert L. (1996). "Deeper Genetic Relationships in North America: Some Tempered Pessimism". Annual Meeting of the Berkeley Linguistics Society. 22 (2): 117–128. doi:10.3765/bls.v22i2.1362. ISSN 2377-1666.
- Rood, David; Boyle, John, eds. (2020). Siouan Languages and Linguistics: Selected Papers by Robert L. Rankin. Brill. doi:10.1163/9789004406285. ISBN 978-90-04-40628-5.
  - Rankin, Robert L. (1998). Siouan–Catawban–Yuchi Genetic Relationship: With a Note on Caddoan. 18th Annual Siouan and Caddoan Languages Conference. Bloomington, Indiana. pp. 146–165.
  - Rankin, Robert L. (2002). A Diachronic Perspective on Active/Stative Alignment in Siouan. Lawrence, Kansas: University of Kansas and Research Center for Linguistic Typology. pp. 181–216.
- Voegelin, C. F. (1941). "Internal Relationships of Siouan Languages". American Anthropologist. 42 (2): 246–249. doi:10.1525/aa.1941.43.2.02a00080. JSTOR 662955.
