= Ohio Valley Siouan languages =

Subfamily of the Siouan languages

Southeastern Siouan
- Geographic distribution: central North America
- Linguistic classification: Siouan-Catawban: Siouan; Southeastern Siouan
- Subdivisions: Ofo; Biloxi; Tutelo

Language codes
- Glottolog: sout2988

The Ohio Valley Siouan, or Southeastern Siouan, languages are a subfamily of the Siouan–Catawban language family, far to the east and south of the Mississippi River. The group includes Ofo and Biloxi, in the Lower Mississippi River valley, and Tutelo, historically spoken in Virginia, near the territory of the Catawban languages. All of the languages are considered dormant, but current efforts by several Yesah communities to revive Tutelo, and the Tunica-Biloxi Tribe of Louisiana to revive Biloxi are in place. There are no current revitalization projects for the Ofo language.

== Geographic Distribution ==
They are called "Ohio Valley Siouan" languages because of a speculative origin along the Ohio River. Oral history and ethnohistorical findings suggest that communities separated into eastern, western, and southern groups over conflict or environmental factors. Robert Rankin, a linguist known for his work on Siouan languages, theorized based on linguistic features that this split in an original proto-Siouan group happened between 1500-1000 BCE. After which, communities moved west to become what is now known as the Western Siouan language family and others went east, becoming the Ohio Valley Siouan language family. The Tutelo and the Saponi historically dwelled near the Ohio River, possibly migrating to the Roanoke River from the region of the Big Sandy River just prior to European contact. The Biloxi and the Ofo lived far to the south, along the Mississippi River.

Although the Ofo and Biloxi resided closer together, phonological comparisons show that the Tutelo and Biloxi languages are much more closely related.

== Classification ==
Charles F. Voegelin wrote, on the basis of linguistic evidence, that Catawban forms its own very distinct branch in the Siouan-Catawban language family (only a minor fraction of the lexicon is obviously cognate, and it uses difficult-to-recognize personal pronouns and favors suppletion). However, Voegelin argued that Biloxi, Ofo, and additionally Tutelo belong in one group, which he proposed to be called Ohio Valley Siouan. His argument stemmed from the fact that these groups were in the same region before dispersing (the Tutelo moving east, the Biloxi and Ofo moving south).

The team of communities actively revitalizing the Tutelo, Tutelo-Saponi, or Tutelo-Saponi-Monacan language use the term Yesą́ to refer to the shared language.
