= Biloxi language =

Extinct Siouan language of Southern US

Biloxi
- Tanêksąyaa
- Native to: United States
- Region: Mississippi, Louisiana
- Ethnicity: Biloxi people
- Extinct: 1930s, with the death of Emma Jackson
- Language family: Siouan-Catawban: Western Siouan; Ohio Valley Siouan; Ofo–Biloxi; Biloxi

Language codes
- ISO 639-3: bll
- Glottolog: bilo1248
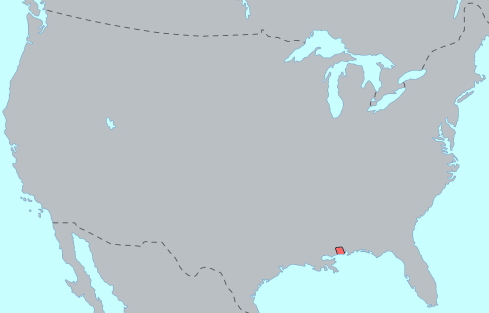
- Pre-contact distribution of the Biloxi language

Biloxi (Biloxi: Tanêksąyaa) is an extinct Siouan-Catawban language formerly spoken by the Native American Biloxi tribe in present-day Mississippi, Louisiana, and southeastern Texas.

== Classification ==
Broadly, Biloxi is a Siouan-Catawban language. Its subfamily is the Ohio Valley languages. Biloxi is related to other Siouan languages like Ofo and Tutelo.

== History ==
A Dictionary of the Biloxi and Ofo Languages

The Biloxi tribe first encountered Europeans in 1699, along the Pascagoula River. By the mid-18th century, they had settled in central Louisiana. Some Biloxi were also noted in Texas in the early 19th century.

By the early 19th century, their numbers had already begun to dwindle. By 1934, the last native speaker, Emma Jackson, was in her eighties. Morris Swadesh and Mary Haas spoke with her in 1934 and confirmed that she knew the language.

== Phonology ==
Multiple possible inventories have been suggested. This article follows that of Einaudi (1976).

=== Vowels ===
Along with contrastive nasalization, Biloxi also has phonemic vowel length.

Biloxi vowels
	Front	Central	Back
Close	i ĩ ⟨į⟩		u
Mid (Note: May be either open-mid or close-mid.)	e	(ə) (Note: Biloxi may have a phonetic schwa, but Dorsey-Swanton (1912) and Haas (1968) are consistent in marking it.)	o õ ⟨ǫ⟩
Open		a ã ⟨ą⟩	

Dorsey & Swanton (1912) postulated phonemic vowel length, which Haas and Swadesh verified in speaking with Emma Jackson in 1934. Their findings appeared in Haas (1968).

Also, there may still be some uncertainty about whether certain words contain /ą/ or /an/.

Example words
Phoneme	Word	Gloss
/i/	ide	"it falls"
/u/	ku	"he gives"
/o/	dohi	"anything rubbed or smeared"
/a/	da	"he gathers"
/į/	įde	"dung, manure"
/e/	ane	"louse"
/ǫ/	dǫhi	"he sees"
/ą/	dą	"he holds"

=== Consonants ===
Biloxi consonants
	Bilabial	Alveolar	Postalveolar	Velar	Glottal
Stop	p b (Note: Has a marginal status.)	t d	tʃ ⟨c⟩	k	
Fricative	ɸ ⟨f⟩	s	ʃ ⟨š⟩	x	h
Nasal	m	n			
Approximant	w	j ⟨y⟩			

Biloxi may also have a phonemic aspiration distinction for some segments.

Example words
Phoneme	Word	Gloss
/p/	pa	"head"
/t/	ti	"house"
/k/	ką	"when"
/d/	de	"he went"
/m/	ma	"ground"
/c/	ci	"they lie down"
/x/	xą	"where"
/n/	ne	"he stands"
/w/	wa	"very"
/s/	si	"yellow"
/h/	hą	"and"
/y/	yahe	"this"

Marginal phonemes
Phoneme	Examples
/b/	
/f/	
/š/	koniška ("bottle") kšixka ("hog")

=== Phonotactics ===
Syllable structure is (C)(C)(C)V(C) or (C)V(C)(C). However, three-consonant clusters are rare.

Most words end in a vowel. The others usually end in /k/ or /x/ as a result of deletion: tox from toho ("he fell").

Few consonant clusters end syllables. Most exceptions are caused by vowel deletion: tohoxk from tohoxka ("horse").

The following consonant clusters are observed:

2-consonant clusters
	p	t	d	c	k	s	x	h	m	n	w	y
p		✓		✓	✓	✓	✓			?		
t	✓				✓	✓	✓		?		✓	✓
d								?				
c	✓	✓			✓							
k	✓	✓	✓	✓		✓	✓			✓	✓	✓
s	✓	✓	✓	✓	✓					✓		
x	✓	✓	✓	✓	✓						✓	✓
h												
m												
n		✓	✓			?	✓					✓
w												
y												

- Geminates do not occur.
- /n/ sonorants and probably /d/ occur only as the second elements of clusters.
- /h/ and /m/ are never the second element.
- Fricatives do not co-occur.

There are a few three-consonant clusters, all of the form C+s+stop or C+x+glide and some with alternate forms:

3-consonant clusters
Cluster	Example
pst	pstuki~pastuki ("she sews")
psd	psdehi~psudehi ("knife") (also spdehi)
tsp	atspąhi ("it adheres") (hadespapahi?)
tsk	kutska~kudeska ("fly") ątska ("infant")
kst	aksteke ("he is stingy")
nsk	apadenska ("butterfly")
pxw	pxwe~pxe ("he punches")
txy	akutxyi ("letter")
kxw	xoxo kxwehe ("he sits on a swing") įkxwe ("always")
kxy	pukxyi ("loop")

== Grammar ==
=== Morphophonemics ===
There are many verb roots and two mode markers with the morphophonemically-conditioned alternation e~a~i (underlying E):

- de ("go")
- ande, yuke ("be")
- ye ("cause")
- e ("say")
- te (optative mode marker)
- dande (potential mode marker)

The alternation depends on the following morpheme:

E → /a/	E → /i/	E → /e/
hi, hortatory mode marker; dande, potential mode marker; ni, negative imperative mode; embedded negative mode marker; Ø, imperative mode marker (female to female); te, imperative mode marker (female to male); xo, subjunctive mode marker; na, strong negative imperative mode marker; xą, ?; ǫ, ǫni, completive mode marker	xti, intensifier	elsewhere

Nouns and verbs whose stems end in -Vhi or -Vhį change to -Vx before the plural marker -tu:

anahį + tu → anaxtu ("their hair")

That may occur with duti ("to eat") also:

duti + tu → dutitu~duxtu ("they eat")

The rule may optionally also apply in compounds and across word boundaries if the next element starts with CV:

asąhi + nǫpa → asąx nǫpa ("both arms")

Nouns that end in -di and can undergo pluralization change to -x: adi + tu → axtu ("their father").

Verbs whose stems end in -Vki, -Vpi, or -si optionally lose their -i before the plural marker:

pastuki + tu → pastuktu ("they sew")
duhapi + tu → duhaptu ("they pulled it off her head")
dusi + tu → dustu ("they grabbed")

||k(i)|| → x/___k occurs optionally across morpheme or word boundaries.

ay + nk + kiduwe → yąk + kiduwe → yąxkiduwe ("you untie me")
mąki ką → mąx ką ("when it was reclining")
but yąk + kinitą + xti → yąkinitą xti ("it is too large for me")

The rule may cause the previous vowel to denasalize.

ay + nk + kica daha → yąk + kica daha → yaxkica daha ("you have not forgotten us")
mąki kide → max kide ("he sat until")

Verbs whose stems end in -ti or -hi may optionally change to -x before the negative mode marker ni:

kohi + ni → kox ni ("they were unwilling")

Stems ending in -si optionally become -s.

nk + Ø + kidusi + ni → axkidusi + ni → axkidus ni ("I did not take it from him")

The dative marker ki becomes kiy before a vowel.

ki + E + tu → kiyetu ("they said to him")

(However, Einaudi cites one counterexample, ki + į → kiį ("they were drinking it for him"), perhaps with a glottal stop inserted.)

The following rule is optional in compounds and across word boundaries and obligatory everywhere else:

V_{1}V_{1} → V_{1}

V_{1}V_{2} → V_{2}

ku + ay + ǫni + ni → kayǫ ni ("you do not make it")
tątǫ + ahi → tątahi ("panther skin")

However, there are a few words with two adjacent vowels, such as naǫ ("day") and hauti ("be sick").

Two morphophonemically identical syllables may not appear contiguously, but the former is dropped.

ku + ku ni → ku ni ("she does not give")

Einaudi finds one counterexample: kite + te → kite te ("she wanted to hit him").

C_{1}C_{1} → C_{1}

ca ha + ay + ye → ca hay + ye → ca haye ("you kill")

The following rule optionally applies to compounds:

XV#CY → XCY

cake + pocka → cakpocka ("hand + round" = "fist")

That may lead to otherwise-disallowed clusters, including geminates:

ayapi + pa + są → ayappasa ("eagle + head + white" = "bald eagle")
ndesi + xidi → ndesxidi ("snake + chief" = "rattlesnake")

The following rule applies to compounds:

Vn#C → V̨#C

dani + hudi → dan + hudi → dąhudi ("eight")

The following rules are conditioned by person markers on nouns and verbs:

Stems beginning with h and some beginning with y undergo the following (obligatory for h-stems but optional for Y-stems): Y, h → ∅ or nk, ay

nk + yehǫ + ni → nkehǫni ("I know")
nk + hu + di → nkudi ("I come from")

However, that does not apply for y-initial (rather than Y-initial) stems:

nk + yaǫni → nkyaǫni ("I sing")

The following rule applies before roots and the dative marker ki: nk → xk

nk + ku → xku ("I come back hither")
nk + ki + ku → xkiku ("I gave him")

nk → ǫn (optionally m or p)

nk + nąki → ǫnąki ("I sit")
nk + pxitu → ǫpxitu ("we cheat")

nk → n (optional except before p and for m unless it was covered by the previous rule)

nk + yą ni → nyą ni ("I hate him")
but nk + sįto → nksįto ("I am a boy")

nk → nk followed by a vowel

nk + ǫ → nkǫ ("I make")

Optionally, ay → aya~ya followed by k or x

ay + kide → yakide ("you go home")
ay + kitupe → ayakitupe ("you carry on your shoulder")

ay → i followed by a consonant

ay + duti + tu → ay + duxtu → iduxtu ("you (plural) eat")

ay → ay~y~iy followed by a vowel

ay + įsihi + xti → ayįsihi xti ("you fear greatly")
ay + ande hi ni → yanda hi ni ("you shall be so")
ay + e → iye ("you say")

The use of different allomorphs in free variation is attested for some verbs.

The next four rules combine personal affixes and so apply only to verbs:

nk + ay → į followed by a consonant

nk + ay + naxte → įnaxte ("I kick you")

nk + ay → ny followed by a vowel

nk + ay + įdahi → nyįdahi ("I seek you")

nk + ∅ → axk

nk + Ø + kte → axkte ("I hit him")

||ay + nk|| → /yąk/ (which may undergo further changes as described above)

ay + nk + dusi → yandusi ("you take me")

The subjunctive mode marker xo undergoes the following rule:

xo → xyo after i or į

ǫ nani xyo ("she must have done it")

The habitual mode marker xa optionally undergoes the following rule:

xa → xya after a vowel

ande xa → ande xya ("she is always so")
but nkaduti te xa → nkaduti te xa ("I am still hungry")

The auxiliary ande' undergoes the following rule:

ande → antk

nkande kąca → nkant kąca ("I was, but")

=== Morphology ===
The three word classes in Biloxi are verbs, substantives (nouns and pronouns), and particles. Only the first two take affixes.

Verbs are always marked for person and number and may also take dative, reciprocal, reflexive, and/or instrumental markers as well as mode markers, the object specifier, and auxiliaries. They are at or immediately before the end of clauses.

All nominal affixes may also be used with verbs, but nouns use a subset of the verbal affixes. They may not use dative, reciprocal, reflexive, or instrumental markers, or mode markers, or auxiliaries.

Particles serve many functions, including noun phrase marking and acting as adverbials.

==== Inflection ====
===== Nouns =====
Nouns may be inflectable or, as most are, non-inflectable.

The former group inflects for person and number. It contains names of body parts and kin terms, which must inflect, and a few other personal possessions, with optional inflection. The person markers are nk- for the first person, ay- for the second person, and Ø- for the third person.

They may be pluralized with the marker -tu. The noun's number itself is not marked explicitly.

Examples of inflected nouns are below:

dodi ("throat") → ndodi ("my throat"), idodi ("your throat"), doxtu ("their throats")
adi ("father") → iyadi ("your father"), nkaxtu ("our father")

Here are examples of optionally inflected nouns:

ti~ati ("house") → nkti/nkati ("my house")
doxpe ("shirt") → idoxpe ("your shirt")

Personal pronouns are formed by inflecting the root indi for person and number. (It may also have been done once by the demonstratives he and de.) Pronouns are always optional and emphasized. Singular pronouns may occur as the subject or the object, but the plurals are always subjects (see -daha).

Biloxi pronouns
nkindi ("I")	nkįxtu ("we")
ayindi ("you")	ayįxtu ("you all")
indi (Note: In free variation with ind and int before h.) ("he, she, it")	įxtu (Note: In free variation with įxt before h.) ("they")

Biloxi has two common demonstratives: de ("this") and he ("that"). They may be marked for plurality as denani and henani, but that is very rare since they are used if plurality is unmarked elsewhere, and it is marked on the verb in noun phrases with classificatory verbs:

ąya atąhį amą de ("these running men")

===== Verbs =====
Verbs inflect for person (1st, 2nd, 3rd), number (singular vs. plural), and mode (many possibilities, including some less understood mode markers).

Morphemes within verbs have the following order:

Verbal morpheme order
(ku)	person	thematic	dative, reciprocal, reflexive	instrumentals	root	number (Note: Very occasionally an enclitic will proceed -tu, e.g. supi xti tu ("they are very black").)	mode

Verbs may either be classificatory or normal. Classificatory verbs specify the subject's position (sitting, standing, etc.) and differ from normal verbs in that the first person is not inflected for person.

Inflection for person and number is identical to inflected nouns:

nk- 1st person
ay- 2nd person
Ø- 3rd person
-tu pluralizes referent of prefix (not used for inanimate subjects)

Because of the rules determining the surface manifestations of some combinations of person markers, 2nd-person-on-1st and 3rd-person-on-1st forms are identical, e.g. yaxtedi ("you hit me, he hit me"). Also, 2nd-person-subj., 2nd-person-on-3rd, and 3rd-person-on-2nd are identical; for example, idǫhi' ("you see" / you see him" / "they see you").

-tu marks animate plurality (except with some motion verbs).

įkcatu ni ("we have not forgotten you")
nkyehǫtu ni ("we did not know")

However, -tu is not used:

1. In the presence of the plural auxiliary yuke ("are"):
  dǫhi yuke ("they were looking at it")
2. When the sentence has already been marked as plural:
  aditu ką, hidedi nedi ("they climbed up, and were falling continually")
3. If it is followed by a plural motion verb:
  dą kahi hą ("they took it and were returning")

Some (but not all) verbs of motion mark plurality with the prefix a- inserted directly before the root:

de ("he goes") → nkade ("we go"), ayade ("you (pl.) go"), ade ("they go")
kide ("he goes homeward") → xkade ("we go homeward")

But there are counterexamples (even ones derived from the same roots):

kade ("he goes thither") → xkadetu ("we go thither"), ikadetu ("you (pl.) go thither")

The morpheme daha marks plural objects when they are not specified elsewhere. It comes after -tu and before all mode markers.

de ya daha ("he sent them")
yacǫ daha ǫni ("she named them (in the past)")

There are two examples of daha being reduced to ha:

įkte ha dande ("I will kick you pl.")
nyiku ha dande ("I will give it to you pl.")

a- may be added to some verb roots to mark an unspecified indefinite object:

ki ("carry on back") → nkaki ("I carried something on my back")
da ("gather") → nkada ("I gather things")

====== Mode markers ======
There are many mode markers in Biloxi. Some are common and well understood, while others are infrequent and have elusive meanings.

Mode markers
Mode		Marker	Position		Examples	Comments
Mode		Marker	Follows:	Precedes:	Examples	Comments
Declarative mode		na (male speaker)	always last		nka dande na ("I will say it"); hetinyǫ nyukedi na ("we are just going to do so to you")	Usage is optional: taneks nkąxti ("I am a Biloxi woman"); cǫki itak nąki ("you dog sits") (meaning "you have a dog")
Declarative mode		ni (female speaker)	always last		nkadutedą ni ("I have finished eating"); įkowa įdahi otu ni ("they themselves hunt and shoot it")	Usage is optional: taneks nkąxti ("I am a Biloxi woman"); cǫki itak nąki ("you dog sits") (meaning "you have a dog")
Interrogative mode		wo (male speaker)	always last (never appears with declarative)		etikįnyǫni wo ("did I do that to you?"); iyixǫ wo ("have you had enough?"); ayą ade wo ("does the wood burn?")	It is unclear what sort of intonation accompanied the interrogative.
Interrogative mode		∅ (female speaker)	always last (never appears with declarative)		kihaki cidike yukedi ("what kin are they two?"); ayą ade ("does the wood burn?")	It is unclear what sort of intonation accompanied the interrogative.
Hortatory mode		hi		na (or wo)	te hiyetu hi na ("you must kill him"); nyiku hi ni ("I shall give it to you")	Almost always appears before declarative na/ni, but there's one example of it before wo: kawa nkǫ ta hi wo ("what will (we) wish to do?") Also, it may appear on its own in an embedded sentence: ani ndǫ ni nkanda hi yihi ("he thought I should not see the water")
Potential mode		dande	tu, daha	na, xe	adutik kikǫ daha dande ("he will make food for them"); nka dande na ("I will say it")	
Optative mode		te (Note: With morphophonemic e (see above))	tu, daha	dande, ǫ, wo, hi, ni	yąxkiyoxpa te yayukedi ("you (pl.) are wishing to drink it up for me"); pis te xti ande ("she strongly desires to suckle")	te almost always follows -tu, but there is a counter-example: te ye te tu ką ("when they wished to kill him") cf. te hiyetu te ko ("when they wished to kill you")
Subjunctive mode		xo~xyo (Note: xo becomes xyo after i or į (see above))	always last		kedi xyo 'he must (?) dig it alone; įnaxta xo ("I will kick you, if")	Semantic force is in question. Involves potentiality and contingency ("... if/provided"). nani ("can") may appear before xyo, lending it the meaning ("must") or ("must have"): ǫ nani xyo ("she must have done it") ede te yake daha yandi nani xyo ("this must be the one who killed us")
Habitual mode		xya~xa (Note: xa becomes xya / V^{f}___ optionally (see above))	Everything except...	... na/ni	supixtitu xa ("they are usually very black"); tiduwi xa ("he alights"); nkakiyasi xa na ("I always liked it") (masc.); nkint ko yinisa ndux ni xa ni ("I never eat buffalo meat") (fem.)	Habitual and declarative combined are sometimes glossed as ("can"): tąhį xa na ("he can run") (if he wishes); akutxyi nkǫ xa na ("I can write")
Negative mode		(ku)...ni			kudǫxtu ni xti ("they could not see them at all"); ayį ni dande ("you shall not drink")	It's unclear when ku is needed. It is used for stems ending in -ni and with the feminine declarative marker ni (Note: Because ni + ni becomes ni (see above)). The negative form of the verb duti ("eat") is kdux ni ("he did not eat"), and not the expected kudux ni.
Imperative mode	Positive	ta (male to male)	stem (+ number marker)		eyąhį ta ("come!"); adǫxtu ta ("look!") (you all)	The plural marker -tu (or a-) is used for plural addressees, and person markers mark objects (except for 2nd person negative imperative). There is one example of the person marker omitted from the (ku)...ni imperative: kąhą ni ("do not cry!")
Imperative mode	Positive	di (male to female)	stem (+ number marker)		akanaki daca di ("come out and gnaw on it!"); dupaxi di ("open the door!")	The plural marker -tu (or a-) is used for plural addressees, and person markers mark objects (except for 2nd person negative imperative). There is one example of the person marker omitted from the (ku)...ni imperative: kąhą ni ("do not cry!")
Imperative mode	Positive	te (female to male)	stem (+ number marker)		dǫxtu te ("you all look!"); dǫ te ("look at him!")	The plural marker -tu (or a-) is used for plural addressees, and person markers mark objects (except for 2nd person negative imperative). There is one example of the person marker omitted from the (ku)...ni imperative: kąhą ni ("do not cry!")
Imperative mode	Positive	∅ (probably used to address children, possibly also female to female)	stem (+ number marker)		yąxkiduwa ("untie me!") (sun to child); ndao hu hą sinihǫ duti hąca ("come here and eat much with me!") (fem. to fem.)	The plural marker -tu (or a-) is used for plural addressees, and person markers mark objects (except for 2nd person negative imperative). There is one example of the person marker omitted from the (ku)...ni imperative: kąhą ni ("do not cry!")
Imperative mode	Positive	xye na (1st person plural)	stem (+ number marker)		te ye xye na ("let us kill her!")	The plural marker -tu (or a-) is used for plural addressees, and person markers mark objects (except for 2nd person negative imperative). There is one example of the person marker omitted from the (ku)...ni imperative: kąhą ni ("do not cry!")
Imperative mode	Negative	na (Note: Requires person marker) (second person strong negative)			yada na ("beware lest you all go!"); ayį na ("do not drink it!")	The plural marker -tu (or a-) is used for plural addressees, and person markers mark objects (except for 2nd person negative imperative). There is one example of the person marker omitted from the (ku)...ni imperative: kąhą ni ("do not cry!")
Imperative mode	Negative	(ku)...ni (the regular indicative form)			ayįktu ni ("do not (ye) let him go!"); akohi ina ni ("do not stand in the yard!")	The plural marker -tu (or a-) is used for plural addressees, and person markers mark objects (except for 2nd person negative imperative). There is one example of the person marker omitted from the (ku)...ni imperative: kąhą ni ("do not cry!")
Imperative mode	Rare	hi ko (deferential)	hi ko: same as hi (potential mode marker)		eke xyi dį ini hi ko ("well, why don't you want (as you have been talking about it for so long!)"; ayįxtu ikada hi ko ("you go home yourselves (instead of telling us to do so!)")	The plural marker -tu (or a-) is used for plural addressees, and person markers mark objects (except for 2nd person negative imperative). There is one example of the person marker omitted from the (ku)...ni imperative: kąhą ni ("do not cry!")
Imperative mode	Rare	dki~tki (Note: Stems ending in -di lose -i and gain -ki, others just gain tki) (possibly for female addressees)			ayindi ded ki ("you go yourself!") (male to female); ini te xti ko, nit ki ("well, walk (as you are so persistent!)")	The plural marker -tu (or a-) is used for plural addressees, and person markers mark objects (except for 2nd person negative imperative). There is one example of the person marker omitted from the (ku)...ni imperative: kąhą ni ("do not cry!")
Imperative mode	Rare	ką			duxtą aku ką ("pull it and bring it here!"); de dǫx ką cidike yuke ("go and see how they are!")	The plural marker -tu (or a-) is used for plural addressees, and person markers mark objects (except for 2nd person negative imperative). There is one example of the person marker omitted from the (ku)...ni imperative: kąhą ni ("do not cry!")
Dubitative mode		ha		na/ni	yihixtitu ha ni ("they might have the most") (fem.); kiyetu kąca ha na ("they must have told her")	Meaning somewhat uncertain due to limited data. Appears adjacent to na/ni like hi, but unlike hi it does this even in embedded sentences.
Strong declarative mode		xye (male speaker)	follows dande		nitani xye ("it is large"); ade ixyǫtu xye ("they talk very rapidly")	Stronger semantic force than na/ni. xye/xe may be followed by xo, but it's unclear whether this lends additional meaning: nda dande xye xo ("I will go whether he wishes or not")
Strong declarative mode		xe (female speaker)		precedes xo	itoho ko nitani xe ("the log is large"); nkapa nedi xe ("my head aches")	Stronger semantic force than na/ni. xye/xe may be followed by xo, but it's unclear whether this lends additional meaning: nda dande xye xo ("I will go whether he wishes or not")
Inferential mode		yeke	dande	na	anik wahetu yeke ("they must have gone into the water"); kide yeke na ("he must have gone home")	Most often used with a declarative marker.
Intensification		wa			ksixtu wa ("they are very crazy"); nkaduti wa nkande ("I am ever eating")	It is unclear exactly how wa differs from xti (see below). It is possible that xti means ("very") while wa means ("so"). wa sometimes may be glossed as ("always").
Completive mode		ǫ~ǫni	te, xti	xa	ǫ: eyąhi ǫ ("he got there (long ago)"); atuka kitani ǫ ("the raccoon was first (in the past)"); ǫni: kitsąya yą tanaki utoho ǫni ("the American first lay in it (in the past)"); ani yą hu ǫni ("the water was coming")	Emphasizes that the event occurred in the past. ǫ often is followed by xa, which may be glossed either as the expected ("regularly in the past"), or ("in the remote past"): kide ǫ xa ("she went home (in the remote past)"); etikǫtu ǫ xa ("they did so (regularly in the past)")
Superlative mode		xti	occurs immediately after whatever is being intensified		supi xti tu ("they are very black"); tca yi xti ande ("he was killing all")	xti may be used with adverbs: ewite xti ("very early in the morning"); kuhi xti ("very high")

==== Derivation ====
===== Nouns =====
Nouns may be derived either through nominalizing verbs or by compounding.

Verbs are nominalized via the prefix a-:

sǫ ("sharp at all ends") → asǫ ("briar")
duti ("eat") → aduti ("food")

Compound nouns may be formed by combining two nouns or a noun and a verb. (Some morphophonemic rules are involved, see above.)

noun + noun:

cindi + aho → cindaho ("hip + bone" = "hip bone")
peti + ti → petiti ("fire + house" = "fireplace")

noun + verb:

sǫpxi + ǫni → sǫpxǫni ("flour + make" = "wheat")
ąyadi + ade → ąyadiade ("people + talk" = "language")

===== Pronouns =====
For the personal pronoun indi, see above. įkowa may be used as a reflexive pronoun. It is possible that both of these, and perhaps the reflexive pronoun -įxki- (see below) are derived from a root in.

===== Interrogatives =====
A number of interrogatives come from the prefix ca- (with vowel elision following morphophonemic rules):

cak~caką ("where?")
cane ("where (stands)?")
canaska ("how long?")
cehedą ("how high, tall, deep?")
cidike ("which, how, why?")
cina~cinani ("how many")

Some are derived from pronouns:

kawa ("something, anything") → kawak ("what?")
cina ("a few, many") → cinani ("how many?")

===== Verbs =====
Verbal derivation may occur by root derivation (reduplication and compounding) or stem derivation (thematic prefixes, dative markers, reciprocals, reflexives, and instrumentals).

====== Reduplication ======
Reduplication, common in Biloxi, is used for intensification or distributiveness. Usually, the first CVC of the root is reduplicated, but sometimes it is only the first CV:

cakcake ("he hung up a lot") → cake ("hang up on a nail or post")
tixtixye ("(his heart) was beating") → tix ("beat")
xoxoki ("he broke it here and there") → xoki ("break")
ǫnacpicpi ("my feet are slipping") → cpi ("slip")

====== Compounding ======
Verbal compounds may be noun + verb or verb + verb.

It seems that most noun-verb compounds are formed by using the verb ǫ ("do, make"):

ką + k + ǫ → kąkǫ ("string + make" = "trap")
cikide + ǫ → cidikǫ ("which + do" = "which to do" = "how")
ta + o → tao ("deer + shoot" = "shoot deer")

Examples of verb-verb compounds:

hane + o haneotu ("they find and shoot")
kte + ǫ įkteǫni ("with + hit + do" = "to hit with")

Some of the above compounds end up having adjacent vowels, since syncope in compounds is optional.

====== Thematic prefixes ======
Thematic prefixes come after person markers and before dative markers and instrumentals.

Thematic prefixes
Prefix	Meaning	Examples
a-	habitual action	dǫ ("see") → kadǫ ni ("he never sees") (meaning blind) duse ("bite") → aduse ("he bites habitually")
a-	directional indicator: "there, on"	dǫhi ("look") → adǫxtu ta ("look!") (male to males) yihi ("think") → ayihi ("he thought")
a-	transitivizer	hį ("arrive") → ahįtu ("they took her there") kuhi ("high") → akuhitu ("they raised it")
į-	instrumental prefix: "with"	ayą + į + duko → ayįduko ("tree + with + whip" = "whip against a tree") į + das + k + ǫ → įdaskǫ ("with + back + obj. + do" = "sit with one's back to")
u-	"within a given area"	toho ("lie down") → utoho ("he lay in it") kci ("dodge about") → unakcikci de ("he went dodging about (the house)")

====== Dative, reciprocal, and reflexive markers ======
The dative marker ki- (kiy- before vowels) is used after thematic prefixes.

kiyetu ("they said to him")
kidǫhi ye daha ("he showed it to them")

It is peculiar in that it may be used if someone else's body parts are the direct object (the "dative of possession").

kiduxtą ("they pulled his [tail]")
kidǫhi ("[they] saw his [shadow]")
kidǫhi ("she looked at her [head]")

It appears as kik- before ǫ ("do, make") and gives it a benefactive gloss; for example, kikǫ daha ("he made for them"). (It should not be mistaken for kiki-.)

The reduplicated kiki- marks reciprocity. The plural marker -tu is then optional.

kikiyohǫ ("they were calling to one another")
kikidǫhi ("they were looking at one another")

įxki- (or ixki-, perhaps because of the denasalizing morphophonemic rule above) marks reflexives. It normally comes immediately after person markers, but in some third-person cases, ki- may come before it:

įxkiyadu ye ande ("he was wrapping it around himself")
kixkidicatu ("they wash themselves")

====== Instrumental prefixes ======
Instrumentals serve to mark how the event was carried out and immediately precede the root.

Biloxi instrumentals
Prefix	Meaning	Examples
da-	"with the mouth or teeth"	dasi ("he (turkey) took it with his mouth") dauxitu (Note: Einaudi speculates that V_{1}V_{2} is not removed because of possible ambiguity.) ("they bite it off")
du-	"with the hand(s), claws, etc."	iduwe ("you untie it") kiduptasi ye ("he caused it to become flat for him")
duk(u)-	"by hitting or punching"	dukxoxoki ("(they) knocked it to pieces") adukuxke ("he peels vegetables")
na-	"with the foot"	naxte ("he kicked it") naksedi ("he broke (a stick) with his foot")
pa-	"by pushing"	paya ("she was plowing") pawehi ("he knocked them")
pu (Note: Only traces of the prefixes remain.)	"pushing or punching"	pucpi ("he failed in pushing or punching") (synonymous with dukucpi)
di	"by rubbing or pressing between the hands"	diputwi ("he made it crumble by pressing it between his hands") kixkidica ("he washes himself")

===== Adverbs =====
Adverbs may be derived from connectives, pronouns, verbs, and particles via a number of affixes:

Adverbial affixes
Affix	Meaning	Examples
e-	"and (?), the aforesaid (?)"	ede e + de ("just now") ewa e + wa ("in that direction") ewitexti e + wite + xti ("very early in the morning") ema e + ma ("right there")
ke-	(?)	kecana ke + cana ("again") kecumana ke + cumana ("again")
kuhi-	"high"	kuhadi kuhi + adi ("upstairs")
ndo-	"hither"	ndao ndo + ao (?) ("hither") ndosąhį ndo + sąhį ("on this side of") ndoku ndo + ku ("back hither") ndowa ndo + wa ("this way")
ewa-	"there"	eusąhį ewa + sąhį ("on the other side of")
-wa	locative ending	ewa e + wa ("in that direction") hewa he + e + wa ("that way") kowa ko + wa ("further along") ndowa ndo + wa ("this way")
-yą	(?)	extiyą e + xti + yą ("at a distance") eyą e + yą ("there") heyą he + e + yą ("there") ndosąhįyą ndo + sąhį + yą ("on this side of")

===== Connectives =====
There are various instances of derived connectives:

e- ("and (?), the aforesaid (?)")

ehą e + hą ("and then")
eką e + ką ("and then")
eke e + ke (?) ("and so")

eke ("so") (probably derived itself, see above)

ekedi eke + di ("that is why")
ekehą eke + hą ("and then")
ekeką eke + ką ("and then")
ekeko eke + ko ("well")
ekeǫnidi eke + ǫni + di ("therefore")

===== Numerals =====
Derived numbers contain predictable vowel syncope (see above).

1–10
Biloxi	Gloss
sǫsa	"one"
nǫpa	"two"
dani	"three"
topa	"four"
ksani	"five"
akuxpe	"six"
nąpahudi (Note: May be derived from nǫpa + ahudi ("two" + "bones") and dani + ahudi ("three" + "bones").)	"seven"
dąhudi	"eight"
ckane	"nine"
ohi	"ten"

11-19 are derived via the formula ("X sitting on Y") ("Y X-axehe").

11–19
Biloxi	Gloss
ohi sǫsaxehe	"eleven" (meaning "one sitting on ten")
ohi nǫpaxehe	"twelve"
ohi danaxehe	"thirteen"
ohi topaxehe	"fourteen"
ohi ksanaxehe	"fifteen"
ohi akuxpaxehe	"sixteen"
ohi nąpahu axehe	"seventeen"
ohi dąxu axehe	"eighteen"
ohi ckanaxehe	"nineteen"

20-99 are derived via the formula ("X sitting on Y Zs") ("Z Y X-axehe")

20–99
Biloxi	Gloss
ohi nǫpa	"twenty" (meaning "two tens")
ohi nǫpa sǫsaxehe	"21" (meaning "one sitting on two tens")
ohi dani	"30"
ohi dani sǫsaxehe	"31", etc.
ohi topa	"40"
ohi ksani	"50"
ohi akuxpe	"60"
ohi nąpahudi	"70"
ohi dąhudi	"80"
ohi ckane	"90"

100-1000 and 1/2
Biloxi	Gloss
tsipa	"100"
tsipa sǫsaxehe	"101" (meaning "one sitting on 100"), etc.
tsipa ohi sǫsaxehe	"111", etc.
tsipa nǫpa	"200"
tsipa dani	"300"
tsipa topa	"400"
tsipa dani	"500"
tsipa akuxpe	"600"
tsipa nąpahudi	"700"
tsipa dąhudi	"800"
tsipa ckane	"900"
tsipįciyą	"1000" ("old man hundred")
ukikįke (Note: Shows up twice as kįkįke)	"one half"

Ordinal numerals (1st, 2nd, 3rd) are not attested. To express 'once', 'twice', 'three times', etc., use the verb de ("to go") before cardinal numbers:

de sǫsa ("once")
de nǫpa ("twice")
de dani ("three times")
de topa ("four times")
de ksani ("five times")

To form multiplicatives, use akipta ("to double") before cardinal numbers:

akipta nǫpa ("twofold")
akipta dani ("threefold")
akipta topa ("fourfold")
akipta ohi ("tenfold")
akipta tsipa ("one hundredfold")

=== Syntax ===
Biloxi is a left-branching SOV language.

Its lexical categories include interjections (I), adverbials (A), subjects (S), objects (O), verbs (V), and connectives (C).

The three types of phrases are:

1. interjectory phrases: I with pauses before and after it
  tenaxi ("Oh friend!")
2. postpositional phrase: pp N (yą)/(de) (see below)
  doxpe itka ("inside a coat")
3. noun phrase: any S or O (see below)
  ayek ita ("your corn")

There are dependent and independent clauses as well as major and minor sentences. (see below)

==== Interjections ====
Interjections may be:

===== Interjectory particles =====
aci ("oh no!")
he he ("hello!")
nu: ("help!")
ux ("pshaw!")

===== Animal cries =====
a: a: ("caw")
pes pes ("cry of the tiny frog")
taǫ ("cry of the squealer duck")
tį ("cry of the sapsucker")

===== Vocatives =====
Vocatives are almost always unmarked:

kǫkǫ ("Oh grandmother!")
kǫni ("Oh mother!")
cidikuna ("Oh Cidikuna!")

There are only three exceptions:

tata ("Oh father!") (suppletive – the regular stem meaning "father" is adi)
nyąxohi ("Oh wife!") (literally "my old lady")
nyąįcya ("Oh husband!") (literally "my old man")

==== Adverbials ====
Adverbials most often appear directly before the verb, but they may also act as subjects and objects. They may not follow verbs or precede connectives in sentence-initial position.

Adverbials may be:

===== Adverbial particles =====
Some particles:

tohanak ("yesterday")
emą ("right there")
eyą ("there")
kiya ("again")
yąxa ("almost")

(Also, see "adverbs", above.)

Usage examples:

skakanadi ewitexti eyąhį yuhi ("the Ancient of Opossums thought he would reach there very early in the morning")
ekeką kiya dedi ("and then he went again")
ndao ku di ("come back here!") (male to female)
tohanak wahu ("yesterday it snowed")

===== Postpositional phrases =====
(For vowel elision, see above.)

Biloxi postpositions
Postposition	Gloss	Example(s)
itka	"in, among"	hawitka de nąki dande na ("I will sit here among the leaves")
kuya~okaya	"under"	ayahi kuya ("under the bed") yaxǫ okaya ("underneath the chair") ayahi okaya ("under the bed")
nata	"middle of"	ani nata akuwe ("they came forth from the middle of the water")
(u)wa	"into, towards"	įkanąk wa de ("toward sunrise")
yaskiya (Note: May have a base form yaski) (Note: Less occurrences than kuya~okaya)	"under"	ti yaskiya ("under the house")
yehi~yehi ką~yehi yą	"close to"	ani yehi da ǫni ("he was going to the edge of the water") ani kyahǫ yehi ką ("close to the well") ayohi yehi yą ("close to the lake")
acka	"near"	ąxu acka xti ("by the stone") (very near)
eusąhį (Note: Here, the unexpected diphthong eu is a shortening of ewa ("there").)~sąhį	"beyond"	ąxu eusąhį ("on the other side of the stone")
ndosąhį	"on this side of"	ąxu ndosąhį ("on this side of the stone")
tawi	"on, on top of"	ąxu tawi yą ("on the stone")
ǫ~ǫha	"with"	cakik ǫha ktedi ("he hit him with his hand")

Almost all of the above allow following de or yą. de has the expected meaning ("here") or ("this"), while yą may be glossed ("the") or ("yonder").

Prepositions are sometimes used without modifying a noun, becoming adverbial:

sąhį yą kiya nkǫ ("I do it again on the other side")
itka yą ustki ("to stand a tall object on something")
kuya kedi ("to dig under, undermine")

===== Some interrogatives =====
Biloxi interrogatives
Interrogative	Gloss	Example(s)
cidike~cidiki	"how?"	cidike ha ni ("how would it be?"); cidike de nkadi nani wo ("how can I climb this?")
cidike~cidiki	"why?"	cidike etikayǫ ("why do you do thus?"); cidike kadeni ("why does it not burn?")
cak~caką (Note: Derived from cina)	"where"	ąya xehe nąki ko cak nąki hą ("where is the sitting man?"); caką ne kuǫni ko ("where he stood before starting back hither")
cina	"some, many"	axok kiduni cina yįki da ("he gathered a few small canes"); cina psohe cucuk max ("there were a few things piles here and there in the corners"); koniška yą kutu dixyį cina ǫni ko henani xya nedi ("when they gave him the bottle, it had as much in it as before")
cinani (Note: cak and caką appear to be in free variation) (Note: Occurs indicatively a few times, e.g. anahįk cinani kiduwe ("he untied some hair for her"))	"how many?"	tohoxka ko cinani yukedi ("how many horses are there?"); kšixka ko cinani yukedi ("how many hogs are there?")

==== Subjects and objects ====
Subjects and objects are formed almost identically, except that the nominal particle ką may only be used after objects.

A subject or object must include a simple noun, and may optionally also include a verb, nominal particle, and/or demonstrative pronoun, in that order.

If the noun is a personal pronoun, it may only (optionally) be followed by either a demonstrative pronoun or a nominal particle, but not both. Other pronouns (e.g. de ("this")) may not be followed by anything.

===== Examples =====
noun-verb

ąya xohi ("the old woman")

noun-nominal particle

ąya di ("the person")

noun-demonstrative pronoun

ąya de ("these people")

noun-verb-nominal particle

ąya xohi yą ("the old woman")

noun-verb-demonstrative pronoun

ąya nǫpa amąkide ("these two men")

noun-nominal particle-demonstrative pronoun

ǫti yą he ("the bear, too")

noun-verb-nominal particle-demonstrative pronoun

ąya sahi yą he ("the Indian, too")

Possession in subjects and objects is expressed by the possessor followed by the possessed, followed by nominal particles.

ąya anahį ką ("people's hair") (obj.)
ąya tik ("the man's house")

Two subjects may be juxtaposed with reciprocal verbs:

cetkana ǫti kitenaxtu xa ("the rabbit and the bear were friends to one another")

Additives may be expressed by juxtaposition followed by the nominal particle yą, but this is not used often due to ambiguity (it might be interpreted as a possessive phrase):

tohoxk wak yą ndǫhǫ ("I saw a horse and a cow")
ąyato ąxti yą hamaki ("a man and a woman were coming")

Alternatives are expressed with juxtaposition followed by the particle ha (otherwise a nominal particle):

sįto sąki ha hanǫ ("is that a boy or a girl?")
tohoxk waka ha hanǫ ("is that a horse or a cow?")

===== Nominal particles =====
Biloxi has many nominal particles, and for the most part their function is unclear.

A non-exhaustive list:

- yą
- di
- yandi
- ką
- -k
- yąką
- ko
- Ø

For the most part it's unclear what conditions the use of a particular np (or ∅), but the following can be said:

1. ką, -k, yąk, yąką are only used with objects
2. yandi almost always is used with human nouns
3. ko is used when the noun is a pronoun, when the main verb is stative, or when there is an interrogative present.

==== Verbs ====
Simple verbs (not causatives or expanded verbs, see below) must contain a person marker, root, and number marker, and optionally the following:

Prefixes:

thematic prefixes
reciprocals, dative markers, reflexives
instrumental markers

Suffixes:

mode markers
object markers

===== Auxiliary constructions =====
Biloxi contains a defective auxiliary verb (h)ande/yuke (ande is used in singular, yuke for plural). By itself, it may mean "to be" or "to stay", but with another verb, it lends durativity. The plural marker -tu is not used with yuke since the defective form itself already serves to mark number.

When the auxiliary construction is used, both the main verb and the auxiliary are inflected.

Examples:

de ande ("he was departing")
iduti yayuke ("you (pl.) are eating")

Generally, to express the negative, the stem is negated, rather than the auxiliary: (Note: But see Einaudi 1976, p. 154, where atamini wa kande ni ("he is not always working") and nkatamini wa nkande ni ("I am not always working") occur, perhaps to avoid ambiguity due to the rule ni + ni → ni)

kox ni yuke di ("they were unwilling")
kukuhi ni yuke ("they could not raise (it)")

===== Classificatory verbs =====
Biloxi contains five classificatory verbs, which indicate duration and position of the subject: (See above for morphophonemic explanation of mąki becoming max.)

Verb	Gloss	Examples
nąki	"sitting"	kak ayǫk yąhi inąki wo ("what have you suffered that causes you to sit and cry?"); pa kidǫhi nąki ("she sat looking at her head")
mąki	"reclining; in a horizontal position" (Note: Unknown whether this inflects the same way as other classificatory verbs in 2nd person.)	įdahi ye daha max ("he continually sent for them"); naxe ąki ("he listened (reclining)")
mąki	plural form: mąxtu~amąki	dǫhi amąx ką ("while they were looking at him"); akikahį mąktu ("they were telling news to one another")
ne	"upright"	ta duxke ne ką ("he stood slaying the deer"); kawak iye inedi wo ("what were you saying as you stood?")
ne	plural form: ne	ade ne di ("they were moving")
hine	"walking"	ąya ni hine ayehǫ ni ("do you know the walking man?"); tohoxkk ni hine ko toxka xe ("the walking horse is gray") (fem.)
ande	"running"	mani ande yą ("the (running) wild turkey"); ąya tąhį yande ayehǫ ni ("do you know the running man?")

These classificatory verbs may be used alone as verbs (kuhik mąx ką ("when it was lying high")) but often reinforce synonymous roots:

xe nąki ("she is sitting (sitting)")
tox mąki ("he was lying (lying)")
sįhįx ne ("it was standing (standing)")
ąya ni hine ayehǫ ni ("do you know the walking (walking) man?")
ąya tąhį yande ayehǫ ni ("do you know the running (running) man?")

They are used mostly with animates. (Note: Compare with ani yįki nax ką eyįhį ("they reached the small (sitting) stream") and ayą ade mąki ("the wood lies burning").)

Classificatory verbs are only inflected for second person when used as auxiliaries.

hamaki~amaki is used as the plural form for all five classificatory verbs (even optionally for mąki and ne, which have their own plural forms mąxtu~amąki and ne):

ąksiyǫ yamaki wo ("are you all making arrows?")
ca hanke te nkamaki na ("we wish to kill them") (masc.)
ąya nǫpa ci hamaki nkehǫ ni ("I know the two reclining men")
ąya nǫpa ni hamaki nkehǫ ni ("I know the two walking men")
ąya xaxaxa hamaki ayehǫ ni ("do you know all the standing men?")

===== Causatives =====
The causative verb ye comes after (uninflected) stems to form a causative construction. In first and second person, ha (sometimes h if followed by a vowel, see 3.1 above) is inserted between the stem and ye.

Examples:

- axehe hanke nąki na ("I have stuck it in (as I sit)") (masc.)
- ca hiyetu ("you kill them all")
- te ye ("he killed her")

===== Expanded verbs =====
Serial verb constructions occur with two or three verbs in sequence. All are of the same person and number, but only the final stem has suffixes:

nkǫ įkte xo ("I do it, I will hit you if...")
hane dusi duxke ("he found her, took her, and skinned her")

==== Connectives ====
Connectives may be coordinating or subordinating:

===== Coordinating =====
Coordinating connectives
	Connective	Meaning	Example(s)
Clause-final	hą	"and"	e hą kidedi ("he said, and went home"); ǫti yandi įske hą yahe yą de ("the bear was scared and went away")
Clause-final	hąca	"but, and subsequently"	ǫti yandi hedi hąca te ye te cetkana ką ("the bear said that, but he wished to kill the rabbit"); apad ǫ hąca kiya dedi ("she wrapped it up, and subsequently went on")
Sentence-initial	ekeką	"and then"	ekeką wax ade ąyato yą ("and so the men went hunting")
Sentence-initial	ekehą	"and then"	ekehą kuhi yą adi ("and then, he climbed up there")
Sentence-initial	ekeko	"well"	ekeko ąksǫtu te ("well, make arrows!") (female to males)
Sentence-initial	eką	"well"	eką towe yą aki yą toho ("and then the Frenchman lay next")
Sentence-initial	eke	"well"	eke he eyąhį hą ("well, she arrived there, and")
Sentence-initial	ekedį	"that is why"	
Sentence-initial	ekeǫnidi	"therefore"	ekeǫnidi ąya anitkak yuke xa ("therefore, there are people under the water")

===== Subordinating =====
All subordinating connectives end the clause. ką is the most common by far and may be related to its nominal particle counterpart.

Subordinating connectives
Connective	Meaning	Example(s)
de hed hą	[marks previous verb as past perfect, lit. ("this finished and")]	dukucke de hed hą tumockanadi xaninati kde ("when he had tied it, the Ancient of Wildcats rolled it along for some time"); duti de hed hą, max ką kidi ("after they had eaten, when they two sat, he came back"); itamino ye de hed hą anahį yą kidakacke de hed hą ("when she had dressed her (and) tied her hair for her")
dixyį	"when, if"	kiyetu dixyį ("whenever they said (that) to him")
dixyą	"whenever, when, if"	ekedį pusi dixyą ("therefore, when it is nighttime...")
ką	"when"	axikiye hande ką ("when he was treating him"); ani akuditu ką, tunaci yąk kidǫhi ("when they peeped down into the water, they saw his shadow")
kne	"just as, as soon as"	
ko	"when, as, since"	
kike	"although"	ayohik sahi xti watatu kike kudǫxtǫ ni xti ("although they watched the pond for a long time, they saw nothing at all")
xyeni	"although"	yaxkica daha xyeni nkįxtu ko įkcatu ni ("although you have forgotten us, we have not forgotten you")

==== Clauses ====
Clauses may end with no more than one clause final connective. Subordinating connectives are used to create dependent clauses.

In clauses, the following order generally holds: (Connective) (Subject) (Object) (Adverb) Verb (Connective). There are occasional examples of subjects and/or objects occurring after the verb, always with animates. The object rarely precedes the subject, possibly for emphasis.

Direct objects always precede indirect objects: ąya xi yandi ąxti yą int ką ku ("the chief gave him the woman").

Full sentences always end in independent clauses. Embedded sentences are not usually marked, but the hortatory marker hi can be used if the embedded action has not yet occurred, and ni can be used if the action was not performed. wo (or wi) is used for mistaken ideas.

== See also ==
- Biloxi tribe
- Tunica-Biloxi
