= Ofo language =

Extinct Siouan language of United States

Ofo
- Rosa Pierite/Pierrette, the last speaker of Ofo, along with an unidentified girl, in 1908.
- Native to: United States
- Region: Mississippi
- Ethnicity: Ofo people
- Extinct: 1915
- Language family: Siouan-Catawban: Western Siouan; Ohio Valley Siouan; Ofo–Biloxi; Ofo

Language codes
- ISO 639-3: ofo
- Glottolog: ofoo1242
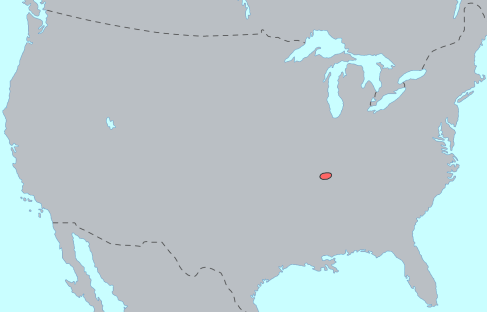
- Distribution of Ofo language

Ofo (/ˈoʊ.foʊ/ OH-foh), also known as Mosopelea, is a language formerly spoken by the Ofo people, also called the Mosopelea, in what is now Ohio, along the Ohio River, until about 1673. The tribe moved south along the Mississippi River to Mississippi, near the Natchez people, and then to Louisiana, settling near the Tunica.

In the 18th century, the Mosopelea were known under the names Oufé and Offogoula. On the basis of the presence of the phoneme /f/ in these names, early linguists once suspected that Ofo was a Muskogean language. However, anthropologist John R. Swanton met an elder and Ofo speaker, Rosa Pierrette, in 1908 while he was conducting fieldwork among the Tunica. From her information, he was then able to confirm that the language was a Siouan-Catawban language and was similar to Biloxi. Pierrette had spoken Ofo as a child, but Swanton says she told Albert Gatschet that the rest of her tribe "had killed each other off" when she was 17.

== Phonology ==
Ofo follows a process similar to Grassmann's law, with /h/ counting as an aspirated consonant: /oskʰa/ 'crane' + /afʰã/ 'white' > /oskəfʰa/ 'white egret' and /apʰeti/ 'fire' + either /təsʰihi/ 'to burn' or /təsʰihi/ 'to breathe' > /apesʰihi/ 'smoke'.

The inventory is as follows:

		Labial	Dental	Palatal	Velar	Glottal
Plosive	tenuis	p	t	t͡ʃ	k	
Plosive	aspirated	pʰ	tʰ	t͡ʃʰ	kʰ	
Plosive	voiced	b	d			
Fricative	tenuis	f	s	ʃ	x	h
Fricative	aspirated	fʰ	sʰ			
Sonorant		w	l	j		
Nasal		m	n			

=== Vowels ===
	Front	Central	Back
High	i, iː ĩ, ĩː		u, uː ũ, ũː
Mid	e, eː	ə	o, oː
Low		a, aː ã, ãː	

All vowels, including /ə/, may bear stress.

== Morphology ==
Ofo is considered to be a mildly polysynthetic language.

=== Possession ===
Ofo distinguishes between alienable and inalienable possession by the use of a prefix for first-, second-, and third-person singular as well as first-person dual. That can be abbreviated to 1sg, 2sg, 3sg, and 1du, respectively. The alienable possessions include the following: 1sg ba-, aba-}, 2sg č-, ača-, 3sg ∅, 1du ã-. The inalienable possessions include the following: 1sg mi-, 2sg čĩ-, 3sg ĩ-, 1du ã-.

=== Negation ===
Ofo uses the enclitic suffix -ni, to demonstrate negation. That enclitic is usually after the predicate.

=== Pluralization ===
Ofo uses the enclitic suffix -tu to pluralize the subject, the object, or both.

=== Instrumental prefixes ===
Instrumental prefixes describe the manner in which an action is carried out. Some instrumental prefixes are below:

- atə- 'by extreme temperature'
- tu-, du- 'by pulling/hand'
- ta- 'by mouth'
- pa- 'by pushing'
- la- 'by foot'
- ka- 'by striking'
- pú- 'by pressure'
- po- 'by blowing/shooting'

=== Person ===
Ofo pronouns
mí̃ti, mí̃*te 'I, me'	čí̃*ti 'you'
í̃*ti 'he'	á̃ti, á̃*ti 'we'

=== Gender ===
Ofo appears to have no grammatical gender.

=== Space, time, and modality ===
The irrealis mood in Ofo consists of the suffix -abe. It is the equivalent to the future in English:

- óktat-,abe, 'he will kill you'
- tcóktat-abĕ, 'you will work'
- atcikthé-be, 'I will kill you'

Continuative aspect is formed using the word nóñki.

Iterative aspect is created by reduplication:

- è-te-te, 'sick, keep on suffering'
- šni-šni-we, 'itch, keep on itching'
- tó-fku-fku-pi, 'wink, blink, keep on winking or blinking'

== Syntax ==
The documentation of Ofo does not provide enough information to develop a complete syntax of the language. However, structures also found in related languages have been found.

Ofo appears to have a head-dependent ordering in sentences, which gives it an object-verb word order. The order of verbs may be described as being clause-final. Many cases appear to support that. An example can be seen below:

b-aphú̂ska a-tci-tp-ábe
my-fist I-you-hit-IRR
'I will hit you with my fist'

=== Case ===
Only some forms are known because of a lack of documentation.

Dative case appears in Ofo and can be interpreted as resembling an accusative pronoun in English.

tcilétci ó̃tcĭku
your.tongue me.you.give
'hold your tongue!'

athé ãtcókpe
dress {me.you.put on}
'you help me dress'

=== Complements and causatives ===
There is no information in the Ofo data to support Ofo having explicit complement clauses. However, it is apparent that embedded clauses precede the main clause.

détõ-ni á-kiu-bĕ
(he).go-COND I-come-IRR
'if he goes, I will come'

The causative is marked by the enclitic -we.

ifphé-we
teach-CAUS
'to teach'

== Sources ==
A Dictionary of the Biloxi and Ofo Languages

- Hodge, Frederick Webb (1911). Handbook of American Indians North of Mexico. Washington, DC: Smithsonian Institution.
- Holmer, Nils, M., "An Ofo Phonetic Law," International Journal of American Linguistics, 1, no. 1, 1947.
- Moseley, Christopher and R. E. Asher, ed. Atlas of the Worlds Languages (New York:Routelege, 1994) Map 5
- Dorsey, J. Owen, and John R. Swanton. 1912. "A Dictionary of the Biloxi and Ofo Languages." Bureau of American Ethnology Bulletin 47. Washington, DC: Government Printing Office.
- Swanton, John R., ca. 1908. Ofo-English dictionary, Typed and Autographed Document, 613 cards. National Anthropological Archives, 2455-OFO, Smithsonian Institution, Washington, DC.
- Swanton, John R. 1909. A New Siouan Dialect. "Putnam Anniversary Volume: Anthropological Essays Presented to Prederic Ward Putnam in Honor of His Seventieth Birthday," pp. 477–86. New York: G. E. Stechert.
