= Edward P. Buford =

American lawyer and politician

Member of the Virginia House of Delegates from Brunswick County
- In office January 14, 1920 – January 10, 1922
- Preceded by: J.D. Elam
- Succeeded by: Marvin Smithey
- In office December 1, 1897 – March 4, 1898
- Preceded by: Robert Simmonds Powell
- Succeeded by: Robert Simmonds Powell

Personal details
- Born: December 15, 1836 Sherwood, Brunswick County, Virginia
- Died: October 26, 1931 (aged 94) Freeman, Brunswick County, Virginia
- Resting place: Buford family cemetery at Sherwood, Brunswick County, Virginia
- Parents: Francis Emmet Buford (father); Martha (Pattie) Stone Hicks (mother)
- Education: McCabe's University School
- Alma mater: University of Virginia Law School
- Occupation: lawyer, politician

Edward Price Buford (December 15, 1865 – October 26, 1931) was a Virginia attorney and politician who served two widely separated terms in the Virginia House of Delegates representing his native Brunswick County, Virginia, as well as many years as the county's Commonwealth attorney (prosecutor).

== Early and family life ==
The third child and second son born to Martha (Pattie) Stone Hicks (1836–1901) and her lawyer (and Confederate veteran) husband Francis Emmet (Frank) Buford (1836–1909). He was raised at "Sherwood", a house his father built on land that his wife (this boy's mother) had inherited from her father. His paternal ancestry could be traced back to John Beaufort or Buford, who emigrated to Lancaster County in the Colony of Virginia in 1635. Virginia not having public schools at the time, Buford received a private education appropriate to his class near home, then continued at Col. McCabe's University School in Petersburg, before attending the University of Virginia and graduating from its law school in Charlottesville. He never married, but was a member of the Episcopal Church and the Westmoreland Club.

His mother was the granddaughter of former North Carolina governor David Stone and daughter of prominent Brunswick County lawyer Edward Hicks. His family also included three brothers and two sisters who reached adulthood. His mother had defied many whites in Lawrenceville (the Brunswick County seat near their home) after the Civil War based on her charity work for destitute blacks, including collecting funds (and donating many of her own) to construct a hospital for them across the highway from their home, as well as the School of the Good Shepherd (which also served as an orphanage for blacks in that segregated era). In 1900 she was devastated by the death of her youngest child, Robert Pegram Buford (named to honor their paternal grandfather, who died shortly after the American Civil War) and herself died shortly thereafter.

E.P. Buford also outlived his father (who died in 1909) and both of his remaining brothers, Emmet Buford (1861–1910) and Frank Buford (1868–1910). Frank had succeeded their father as editor of the Democratic leaning Brunswick Gazette, which had opposed the Martin Organization (a predecessor of the Byrd Organization) and was sold in 1922 and combined with the other Brunswick County paper. His sister Mary, who had married Petersburg physician Robert Alston Martin, died in 1922. The longest lived Buford sibling was their sister Elizabeth (1865–1951), who married Rev. Robert Strange Jr. (who became bishop of North Carolina and buried some of the Bufords before his own death in 1914), who returned to Lawrenceville to live in the old family home with this man and later donated his papers to the University of Virginia Library.

== Career ==
Admitted to the Virginia bar in 1887, Buford argued his first case before the Supreme Court of Virginia in 1890, a year before Brunswick voters elected him their Commonwealth attorney (prosecutor). He was admitted to the bar of the United States Supreme Court in 1893. Buford continued as Brunswick's prosecutor until 1917, when he resigned rather than enforce the new Prohibition law.

In private practice, Buford partnered with several local attorneys, including Peterson, C.T. Baskerville and S.E. Williams. In 1917 he unsuccessfully represented a widow who had signed a prenuptial agreement before marrying her husband (as a second wife, the daughter of the first wife becoming the man's chief beneficiary of the estate administered by a bank). This involved three cases, all lost by this man's client around the time this man ended his prosecutorial career. In 1928 Buford would publish a Virginia Law Review article about the Prohibition Amendment, having previously published an article about the Federal Employer's Liability Act in the Harvard Law Review in 1914, as well as five speeches in Virginia bar publications in the 1920s.

Meanwhile, by 1885, while this man was in law school, his lawyer father (himself a former Brunswick prosecutor) had become a judge for Brunswick County, but resigned after this man won election as Commonwealth attorney, and successfully ran for the legislature in 1892. While Brunswick voters had not re-elected delegate Frank Buford in 1895, in 1897 this man (his son) was elected as their part-time representative in the Virginia House of Delegates, electorally defeating his father's successor. Buford unsuccessfully ran in the Democratic primary in 1899 for the state senate seat vacated by fellow Brunswick county clerk, lawyer and future Congressman Robert Turnbull (his father having been succeeded as local judge by another Turnbull). The Democratic candidate (successful in the general election) instead became fellow lawyer and future governor William Hodges Mann of Nottoway County, but Virginia's legislature adjusted that congressional district boundaries to exclude Brunswick County.

Decades later, in 1919 (a decade after his father's death and after Buford resigned as prosecutor, and nearly two decades after adoption of a new state constitution in 1902 created circuit courts), this man again ran for Brunswick County's legislative seat, and again served one term. During that legislative term, his native Brunswick County experienced its last illegal lynching, as a crowd lynched one of two men from Norfolk who had encountered the postmaster of the Tobacco store and post office walking home, robbed and murdered him, not long after a similar incident in Dinwiddie County. Within days, sheriffs from the two counties had apprehended two suspects wearing the postmaster's watch and clothing from the store. However, they encountered a crowd, which lynched one man in front of that store before the postmaster's funeral. The sheriffs had managed to escape with the other man, who was ultimately tried, convicted and executed in Richmond. Local ministers had condemned the lynching, but the grand jury ultimately secured no indictments for that crime. In 1922 Buford became the president of the Virginia State Bar.

After that second legislative term, on May 22, 1924, Buford was the main speaker at the dedication of a historical marker at Fort Christanna by the Society of the Colonial Dames of America, which had acquired approximately 3 acres of land from what had long been called the "Fort Hill" plantation, and which centuries earlier had been Fort Christanna, a resettlement area for displaced Occaneechi, Nansemond, Saponi, Eno and Tutelo. Before his speech, the platform erected for the distinguished guests, including Lyon Gardiner Tyler, Rev. Bland Tucker and a group of Pamunkey Native Americans from King William County dressed in full regalia, the platform collapsed, but no one was hurt, and Buford delivered his address.

== Death and legacy ==
Buford committed suicide with a shotgun blast to his head on October 26, 1931, about 2 months shy of his 66th birthday, and was buried in the family cemetery at Sherwood. Thus, his sister Elizabeth, who had lived with him at Sherwood during the last federal census of his lifetime, became the last surviving Buford sibling. During the Great Depression, which had begun by that time, following years of drought in the area, land prices had plummeted and four banks failed in Lawrenceville, with only the Farmers and Merchants Bank of Broadnax branch remaining by 1937. His sister donated his papers to the University of Virginia in 1936, and the institution obtained releases from distant relatives in the 1980s and recently indexed them.
