= Monacan Indian Nation =

Native American tribe in Virginia, U.S.

Monacan

Total population
- 2,000 enrolled citizens

Regions with significant populations
- Virginia, West Virginia, Maryland, Ohio

Languages
- English, formerly Tutelo

Related ethnic groups
- Tutelo, Occaneechi, Manahoac

The Monacan Indian Nation is a federally recognized tribe of Monacan people, an Indigenous people of the Northeastern Woodlands. It is also one of eleven Native American tribes recognized since the late 20th century by the U.S. Commonwealth of Virginia.

In January 2018, the United States Congress passed an act to federally recognize the Monacan and five other tribes in Virginia. They had earlier been so disrupted by land loss, warfare, intermarriage, and discrimination that the main society believed they no longer were Indians. However, the Monacans reorganized and asserted their culture.

The Monacan nation was first recorded by Jamestown settlers in colonial Virginia, as living west and upland of the Tidewater area. Their native language is part of the Siouan-Catawban language family. They are related to other peoples of the Appalachian foothill region, such as the Tutelo, Saponi and Occaneechi. One of their former villages, upriver of the falls of the James River was abandoned by the 18th century and the land granted to Huguenot settlers, who retained the name of Manakin town. Today, the Monacan nation is located primarily in their traditional Piedmont region, particularly in Amherst County near Lynchburg. As of 2018, the Monacan Indian Nation had approximately 2,000 citizens. There are satellite groups in West Virginia, Maryland, Tennessee, and Ohio.

== History ==
=== 17th century ===
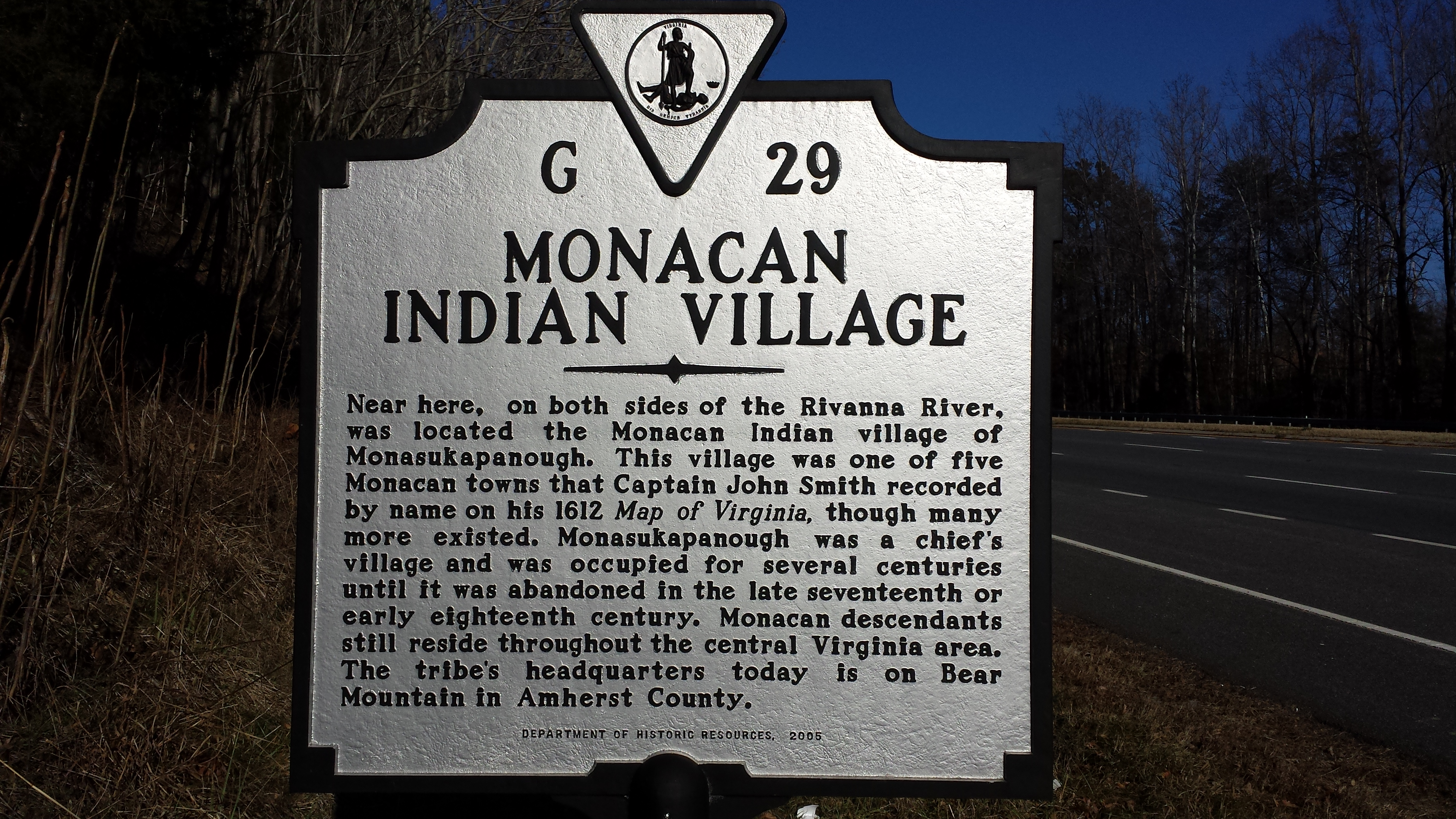
Historical marker near the site of the Monacan village of Monasukapanough in northern Albemarle County, Virginia.

When Jamestown settlers first explored the James River in May 1607, they learned that the James River Monacan (along with their northern Mannahoac allies on the Rappahannock River) controlled the area of the Piedmont between the Fall Line (where present-day Richmond developed) and the Blue Ridge Mountains. The Monacan were hostile competitors with the Powhatan confederacy, a group of 30 Algonquian-speaking weroancies who controlled much of the Tidewater and coastal plain. The Weroance Parahunt, son of Powhatan the Mamanatowick of the Powhatan confederacy, persuaded Captain Christopher Newport not to venture beyond the James River falls into Monacan country.

However, the determined Newport made an expedition into Monacan country in November 1608. On a 40-mile (64 km) march upstream along the banks of the James River, the settlers found two Monacan towns, whose names they recorded as Massinacak and Mowhemenchough. Unlike the Powhatan, who had given the settlers lavish welcomes, the Monacan largely ignored them and went about their business. The settlers captured their leader and forced him to guide them around his territory. On November 26, 1608, Peter Wynne, a member of Newport's party to the Monacan villages, wrote a letter to John Egerton informing him that some members of the party believed the pronunciation of the Monacans' language resembled "Welch" (Welsh), which Wynne spoke. Newport had asked Wynne to act as interpreter, but the language was not Welsh and he could not understand it.

Mowhemencho, the Monacan nation's easternmost outpost, was upriver of the falls of the James River, between Bernard's Creek and Jones Creek in the eastern tip of present-day Powhatan County. Massinacak (Mahock) was further upriver at the mouth of Mohawk Creek, a mile south of present-day Goochland. The Monacan capital was Rassawek, located at the point within the two branches, Point of Fork, of the upper James and Rivanna rivers. Tributary to them were the Monahassanugh (later known as the Nahyssan, i.e. Tutelo), whose town was further upstream on the James River near what later developed as Wingina, and the Monasukapanough (later known as the Saponi), living near present-day Charlottesville upstream on the Rivanna River. All these groups were closely related with the Manahoac to the north.

In 1656 several hundred Nahyssan, Mahock, and Rechahecrians (possibly Iroquoian-speaking Erie from present-day Pennsylvania) threatened both the Powhatan weroancies and the settlers by camping near the James falls. A combined force of the Powhatan and settlers was sent to dislodge them. The Pamunkey Weroance Totopotomoi was slain in the resulting battle. Historically the Monacan and Erie were trade allies, especially copper.

The Monacan towns of Mowhemencho and Mahock were still occupied in 1670, when John Lederer and Major Harris recorded visiting them; they found that the men possessed muskets. Lederer recorded their tradition that they had settled in the area on account of an oracle 400 years earlier, having been driven from the northwest by an enemy nation. They told him they had found it occupied by the Doeg, whom they eventually displaced, in the meantime teaching them the art of growing corn.

He recorded another Monacan tradition as follows: "From four women, viz. Pash, Sepoy, Askarin, and Maraskarin, they derive the race of mankinde; which they therefore divide into four tribes, distinguished under those several names."

At the time of Lederer's visit, the nation had about 30 bowmen or warriors, out of a total population of perhaps 100. Lederer also noted the towns of Sapon and Pintahae on the Staunton River. Batts and Fallam recorded the latter town as Hanahaskie in 1671. The 20th-century ethnologist Swanton considers this last to be a Nahyssan village. Around 1675 the Nahyssan settled on an island at the confluence of the Stanton and Dan rivers, upriver of the Occaneechi people.

In 1677, the Monacan leader Surenough was one of several native signatories to the Treaty of Middle Plantation following Bacon's Rebellion. Virginian settlers and the Pamunkey encountered them, and the Manahoac, on the Upper Mattaponi and North Anna rivers in 1684.

By 1699, many Monacans were forced to abandon their traditional territory, fleeing farther away due to European encroachment.

=== 18th century ===
The Virginian House of Burgesses granted much of the former site of Mowhemencho to French Huguenot refugees, who were settled on both sides of the James River in 1700 and 1701. First promised land at Jamestown, they were forced by the Virginian colonial government to settle above the falls. In Goochland County, they established the villages of Manakin and Sabot, today known as Manakin-Sabot, Virginia.

Although a few Monacans lingered in the area as late as 1702, the core remnant seems to have merged with the Nahyssan and other closely related peoples, by then known generally as Tutelo-Saponi. Under this collective name, the bulk of the nation may be traced to North Carolina (1702), and back to Virginia (Fort Christanna, 1714). Many headed north and joined the Haudenosaunee Confederacy. Monacans were noted living in Pennsylvania (Shamokin, by 1740); and in western New York at Coreorgonel by 1753, where they lived with the Cayuga. They participated with the Cayuga in the American Revolutionary War as allies of the British against the Patriots. After the war, many Monacans having long been members of the Haudenosaunee Confederacy were settled at the Six Nation Reserve of the Grand River First Nation in present-day Ontario. Their settlement of Tutelo Heights was noted in 1779. By the early 20th century, their descendants in Ontario had been largely assimilated by the Cayuga unable to maintain their distinct culture due to colonialism.

Smaller communities are believed to have split off in North Carolina, and at several locations across Virginia.{cn}

Meanwhile the new European colonists noted several large pre-existing mounds, and in 1784 Thomas Jefferson excavated part of one burial mound on the Rivanna River near the former Monasukapanough, which he later mentioned in his "Notes on the State of Virginia" and which modern archeologists estimate to have contained as many as one thousand people. Another excavated mound was called "Rapidan" on the Rapidan River near the Stegara village. However, most other surviving mounds were further west, including "Bowman" on the North Fork of the Shenandoah River, and the northernmost mound at "Brumback" on the South Fork of the Shenandoah River. Other mounds were at "John East" and "Lewis Creak" before their confluence into the South Fork of the Shenandoah River. Two further mounds were at "Hayes Creek" and "Bell" on the Maury River upriver of its confluence with the James, and "Clover Creek" and "Withrow" on the Cowpasture River before its confluence with the upper portion of the James, and "Hirsh" on the Jackson River before its confluence near the headwaters of the James.

=== 19th century ===
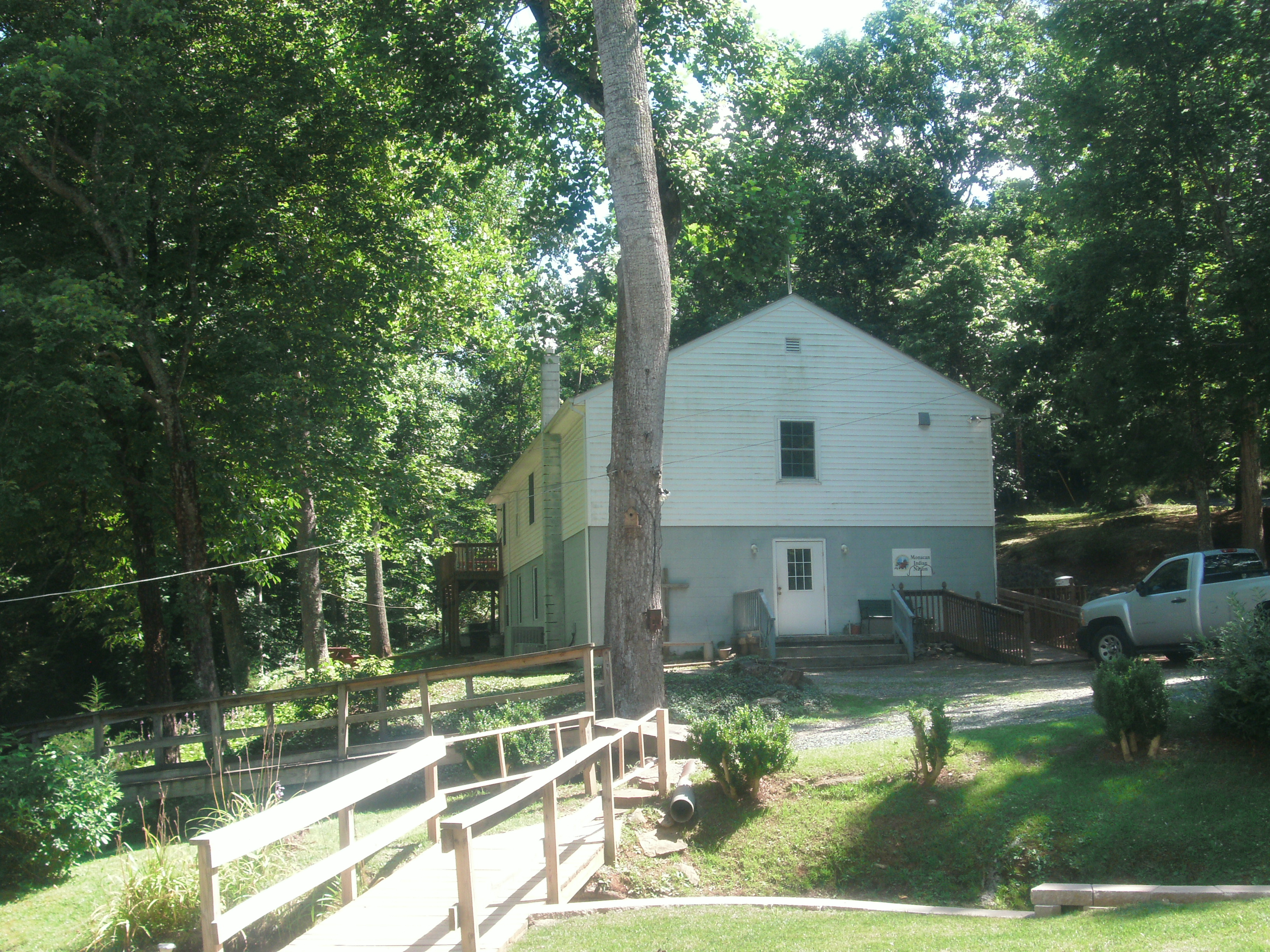
Current headquarters of the Monacan Indian Nation in Amherst, Virginia

After Peter Wynne's expedition of 1608, the Monacan are one of the groups who have been conjectured to be "Welsh Indians". Historians have found no evidence and treat it as myth. The Monacan language was part of the Siouan-Catawban language family.

Between 1831 and 1833, William Johns, an ancestor of some of today's Monacan, purchased 452 acres (1.83 km^{2}) of land on Bear Mountain for a settlement of families related to him. In 1850, the census recorded 29 families there.

=== 20th century ===
Over time, Native Americans in Virginia intermarried with Europeans and African Americans. Whites assumed that meant that they no longer identified as Indians, but were mistaken. In 1924, Virginia passed a Racial Integrity Act, which instituted a binary system of racial classification as black or white only. It also included the one-drop rule, requiring classification as black of a person with any known African ancestry. The director of the department of vital records Walter Ashby Plecker, Virginia's registrar of vital statistics) insisted on reclassifying specific families as black, although they had long been recorded as Indian. This program ignored how people identified socially and culturally, and disrupted decades of records, causing American Indians in Virginia to lose historical continuity. But they kept their culture and community, and reorganized in the 20th century to regain recognition as Native American peoples.

In 1926 Mongrel Virginians: The WIN Tribe, a study of a mixed-race group in the Blue Ridge Mountains, was published by the Carnegie Institution. The author described the group as "degenerate". The author referred to the group as the WIN tribe, for White-Indian-Negro, because he was disguising the name of the group, the surnames of its members, the county which was studied – every fact about them. Some contemporary academic reviewers strongly criticized and ridiculed the book and its reliance on community anecdotes to make judgments about families and individuals.

When ancestors of current Monacan families entered the U.S. military to serve in the world wars, they resisted accepting the classification of "colored", which the state of Virginia had tried impose on them.

In 1946 the researcher William Harlan Gilbert Jr. described the Monacan in his "Memorandum Concerning the Characteristics of the Larger Mixed-Blood Racial Islands of the Eastern United States". Edward T. Price had a study in 1953, "A Geographical Analysis of White-Negro-Indian Racial Mixtures in the Eastern United States ". Both used the former name for the group, "Issues", generally used to refer to free people of color, most of whom were mixed-race, who were free before the Civil War and general emancipation. Both authors considered the Issues (sometimes called "Old Issues") to be tri-racial.

The Episcopal Church ran a primary school (Bear Mountain Indian Mission School) for the children of this community at Bear Mountain near Amherst, Virginia. There was no high school education available. In 1963, Amherst County proposed a $30,000 bond to build a school for the mission community. The proposal was voted down, and 23 students applied for transfer to public schools. The state approved their applications and the mission school closed.

=== Claims and recognition as Native American ===
In the early 1980s, Peter Houck, a local physician, published Indian Island in Amherst County, in which he speculated that the free people of color in the region during the antebellum era were in part descendants of the Monacan tribe. While this population had claimed an Indian cultural identity since the turn of the 20th century, Houck was the first to link some of them to the Monacan tribal identity. Prior to Houck's book, most people claiming Native American ancestry in that vicinity had identified as Cherokee, which were well-known in the Southeast. Many of the local families continue to claim Cherokee instead of Monacan ancestry.

In 1988, the Monacan Tribe incorporated as a nonprofit organization to establish its presence. In 1989, the tribe was officially recognized by the State of Virginia. Other tribes recognized by the state include the Chickahominy, Eastern Chickahominy, Mattaponi, Nansemond, Pamunkey, Rappahannock, Upper Mattaponi, Patawomeck, Nottoway, and Cheroenhaka (Nottoway) tribes.

On January 30, 2018, federal recognition status was granted to the Monacan Nation and five other tribes in Virginia through passage by Congress of the Thomasina E. Jordan Indian Tribes of Virginia Federal Recognition Act of 2017. President Trump signed the bill approved by both houses of Congress.

== Name ==
The Monacan were also historically known as the Manskin. Their territory on the Pamunkey River was also called Manskin.

== Manonoakins on the Eastern Shore ==
Complicating matters, one of the subgroups of the Algonquian-speaking Pocomoke people who lived on what is now known as the Eastern Shore of Maryland, was sometimes called the Manonoakin or Manakin tribe. Although Capt. John Smith encountered the Pocomoke people in the early 17th century, and some descendants continue to live in the area, disease and governmental displacement policies devastated the tribe by that century's end. Maryland only began contemplating state recognition of its Indigenous people in 1974 with the creation of its Commission on Indian Affairs. Unlike Virginia, it has to date only recognized officially two tribes, the Piscataway (who lived across from modern Washington, D.C.) and the Accohonnock (who also lived on the Eastern shore), and neither has achieved federal recognition. Nonetheless, Maryland in December 2023 unveiled a historical marker commemorating the Manonaokin village. Furthermore, in Tidewater Virginia, a plantation constructed for founding father Francis Lightfoot Lee was called Menokin after the place name used by the Rappahannock people, another Algonquian-speaking people and who like the Monacan received federal recognition in 2018.

== Celebrations ==
Today the Monacan Indian Nation operates a yearly powwow in May, and a homecoming celebration in October. A model of an ancient Monacan village has been constructed as part of Natural Bridge (Virginia) State Park, in nearby Rockbridge County.

== See also ==
- Linville Mound, precontact mound in Virginia
