= Manahoac =

Historical Native American tribe from Virginia

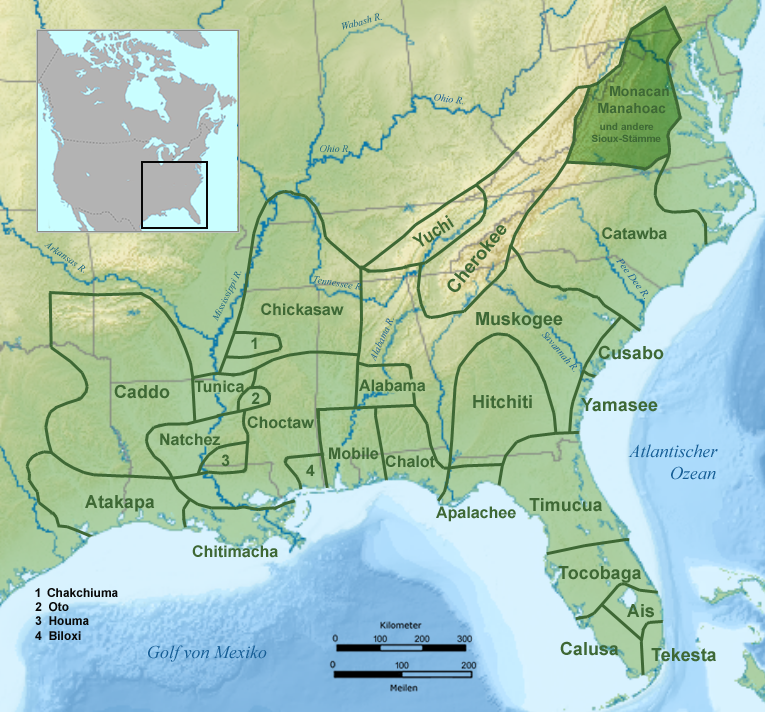
- Seventeenth century Monacan territory

Total population
- Extinct as a tribe (1728)

Regions with significant populations

Languages
- Unclassified, possibly Algonquian or Tutelo

Religion
- Indigenous religion

Related ethnic groups
- Tutelo, Occaneechi, Monacan and Saponi

The Manahoac, also recorded as Mahock, were an Indigenous people of the Northeastern Woodlands, who lived in northern Virginia at the time of European contact. They numbered approximately 1,000.

They lived primarily along the Rappahannock River west of present-day Fredericksburg and the Fall Line, and east of the Blue Ridge Mountains. They merged with the Monacan, the Occaneechi, the Saponi and the Tutelo. They disappeared from the historical record after 1728.

== Etymology ==
According to William W. Tooker, the name Manahoac is Algonquian for "they are very merry", but anthropologist John R. Swanton considered this dubious.

== History ==
After thousands of years of different Indigenous cultures in present-day Virginia, the Manahoac and other Piedmont tribes developed from the precontact Woodland cultures. It is argued that more tribes spoke Siouan-Catawban languages in the Piedmont region than is directly attested.

=== 17th century ===
The Manahoac were a confederacy of smaller bands. In 1608, the English explorer John Smith met with a sizable group of Manahoac above the falls of the Rappahannock River. He recorded that they lived in at least seven villages west of where he had met them. One of their villages was named Mahaskahod, below the confluence of the Rappahannock and Rapidan Rivers. Hassinunga was near the confluence; Tauxania further upstream on the Rappahannock, and Shackaconia upstream on the Rapidan River, with Stegara the most upstream on the Rapidan. Smith also noted that they were at war with the Powhatan and Haudenosaunee but were allied with the Monacan.

As the Beaver Wars upset the balance of power, some Manahoac settled in Virginia near the Powhatans. In 1656, these Manahoac fended off an attack by English and Pamunkey, resulting in the Battle of Bloody Run (1656).

By the 1669 census, because of raids by Haudenosaunee tribes from the north during the Beaver Wars and probably infectious disease from European contact, the Manahoac were reduced to only 50 bowmen in their former area. Their surviving people apparently joined their Monacan allies to the south immediately afterward. John Lederer recorded the "Mahock" along the James River in 1670. In 1671, Lederer passed through their former territory but made no mention of any inhabitants. Around the same time, the Seneca people of the Haudenosaunee began to claim the land as their hunting grounds by right of conquest, though they did not occupy it.

=== 18th century ===
In 1714, Lt. Governor of Virginia Alexander Spotswood recorded that the Stegaraki subtribe of the Manahoac was present at Fort Christanna in Brunswick County. The fort was created by Spotswood and sponsored by the College of William and Mary to convert natives to Christianity and teach them the English language.

The anthropologist John Swanton believed that a group at Fort Christanna, called the Mepontsky, were perhaps the Ontponea subtribe of the Manahoac. The last mention of the Ontponea in historical records was in 1723. Scholars believe they joined with the Tutelo and Saponi and became absorbed into their tribes. In 1753, these two tribes were formally adopted in New York by their former enemies, the Iroquois, specifically the Cayuga nation. In 1870, there was a report of Nikonha (Tutelo, c. 1765–1871), a "merry old man named Mosquito" living in Canada, who claimed to be "the last of the Manahoac" and the legal owner of much of northern Virginia. He still remembered how to speak the Tutelo language.

== Culture ==
The Manahoac people lived in various independent villages. These tribes traded, intermarried, and shared cultural celebrations. Manahoac villages were usually along the upper Rappahannock River where the soil was most fertile. They practiced a mixture of hunting and gathering as well as farming.

Along the upper James River, where the closely related Monacan tribe was located, archeologists have found remnants of corn and squash in cooking pits. Also found along the James are the outlines of three oval houses at a site outside the town of Wingina in Nelson County, Virginia. Given the close relations of the Monacan and the Manahoac, scholars believe these aspects of their cultures were similar or identical. Many stone tools have been unearthed in areas which the Manahoac inhabited. They are usually made of the milky quartz common in the region. Their pottery was tempered with quartz and sand; it often featured fabric, net, or cord motifs as decoration.

Archaeological evidence shows that an earthen mound burial culture existed in the Piedmont from AD 950 to the time of European contact. It spanned the so-called Late Woodland Period. These burial mounds, some of them reaching heights of at least 6 meters (20 ft), are believed to have been made by the ancestors of the Manahoac. They are unique in that they contained hundreds to thousands of corpses. They are sometimes called "accretional mounds". The people added more soil to them as additional individuals were buried within. Most of the burial mounds have been either completely destroyed by plowing or significantly reduced in size by erosion and flooding. See also Mounds in Virginia.

=== Organization ===
The Manahoac are sometimes viewed as a confederacy of tribes, or as a single tribe composed of several subtribes. These include the following:

- Hassinunga, who were at the headwaters of the Rappahannock River;
- Manahoac proper, who, according to Thomas Jefferson, were present in Stafford and Spotsylvania counties;
- Ontponea, who were located in Orange County;
- Shackaconia, who were found in Spotsylvania County on the southern bank of the Rappahannock;
- Stegarake, who lived along the Rappahannock and Rapidan rivers between the North Anna and Potomac rivers at the time of European contact. The Stegarake were the last remaining tribe of the Manahoac Confederacy, being last recorded in 1728;
- Tegninateo, who were located in Culpeper County at the head of the Rappahannock; and the
- Whonkentia, who were present in Fauquier County near the head of the Rappahannock

Colonists recorded the name of one village: Mahaskahod; it was most likely located near modern Fredericksburg.

== Language ==
The language of the Manahoac is not known, although John Smith stated that they spoke a language different from that of the Monacan. Anthropologist James Mooney in 1894 suggested that the Manahoac spoke Tutelo, based on his speculation that the town called Monasickapanough was related to the Tutelo-speaking Saponi. He also claimed that the town Monahassanugh was the same as the name Nahyssan, Hanohaskie (a variant spelling of a Saponi town), and Yesaⁿ (Yesaⁿ is the autonym of the Tutelo). His argument was based on the assumption that the initial syllable Mo-, Ma- was supposedly a Tutelo morpheme meaning, "place, earth, country". More recently, Ives Goddard has pointed to problems with Mooney's claimed evidence and argued that it is more probable that these town names are from the Powhatan language, which was the language of John Smith's guides. Additionally, one town appears to be from Algonquian pidgin.

Because John Lederer stated that two of the tribes he listed spoke the same language, Mooney assumed Lederer's Managog was a misspelled Monahoac, and that Monahoac and Saponi must be the two tribes with a common language. The common language may, in fact, be the Tutelo language, which was used as a lingua franca in the region. Thus, Mooney's interpretation is not supported by the primary sources. The Manahoac likely spoke multiple languages for trade reasons.
