= Rapidan Mound =

Ancient Manahoac burial site

Coordinates: 38.263°N 78.268°W

Rapidan Mound is an ancient Manahoac burial site on the south bank of the Rapidan River in Western Orange County, Virginia, east of Scuffletown. The mound is next to an ancient Manahoac village called Stegara that explorer Capt. John Smith noted on maps made after his 1608 visit to the region. Scientists have dated the burial site, and 13 similar ones in the region, to the late prehistoric and early contact era (ca. A.D. 900–1700) with some artifacts at the site suggesting human activity as early as A.D. 660.

== History ==
Stegara, the nearby village, appears on a map published in 1612 that was made from the observations and communications of John Smith on his 1608 journey. Known as the "Stegaraki" people, they were a tribe of the Manahoac Confederacy.

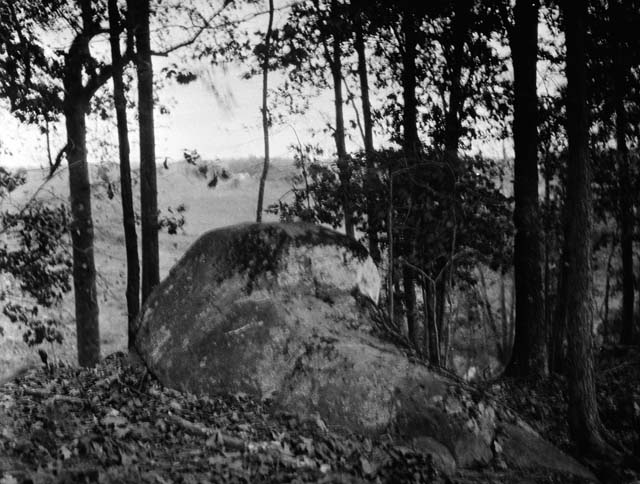
Mound on Rapidan, Manahoac Village of Stegara, 1928.

The five known Manahoac communities in the region were: Stegara, Shackaconia, Tanxsnitania, Hassuiuga and the Mahaskahod. The Stegara created "the Rapidan Mound located on the Rapidan River’s edge," according to the James Madison Museum of Orange County Heritage.

The Manahoac were a tribe of Native Americans who hunted, traveled and lived near the headwaters and falls of the Rappahannock River and its tributaries, including the Rapidan; they allied with the Monacan confederation. Both prospered within the Late Woodland Period of Native American culture (AD 900 to AD 1600).

== Archaeology ==
During the settlement of the region by non-Indigenous peoples in the mid-18th century, the site was part of the property of John Conyers White (1696–1787), who purchased 356 acres (144 ha) from James Madison Sr., the father of President James Madison, part of the Octonia Grant.

In the 19th century, the mound was said to stand 12 ft (3.7 m) high and covered an area 80 ft (24 m) in diameter. Today, after repeated flooding, only the edge of the mound remains at less than half the height.

Beginning in 1988, University of Virginia archaeologists removed human skeletal remains associated with at least 60 individuals. In 1998, an estimated 9,000 bones were reburied by the Monacan. Scientists have recovered arrow-points, axes, smoking pipes and other objects from the site. Archaeologists estimated that between 1,000 and 2,000 people were buried, making it the largest American burial site in Virginia.
