= John Buck =

John Buck may refer to:

- John Buck (MP) (1566–1648), MP for Droitwich in 1601
- John Buck (Taunton MP), MP for Taunton (1741–1745)
- John Buck (baseball) (born 1980), American baseball catcher
- John Buck (Onondaga politician) (c. 1818–1893), Onondaga politician
- John E. Buck (born 1946), American sculptor and printmaker
- John R. Buck (1835–1917), United States congressman
- John Buck (winemaker), New Zealand winemaker
- John Lossing Buck (1890–1975), American agricultural economist
- John Buck of the Buck baronets

== See also ==
- Buck (surname)
