= Scuffletown, Virginia =

Unincorporated community in Virginia, US

Coordinates: 38°15′31″N 78°17′54″W

Scuffletown is an unincorporated community in Orange County, Virginia, United States. It lies at an elevation of 571 feet (174 m).

On the border of eastern Greene County, Scuffletown is in the far northwestern corner of the Madison-Barbour Rural Historic District and about eight miles (13 km) north of Barboursville.

It's located at the intersection of three counties including Madison to the north and Greene to the west (formed from Orange in 1838). The old Stanardsville Plank Road, Virginia State Route 231, also called Scuffletown Road, bisects the area.

== History ==
The area contains Native American prehistoric burial and settlement sites. It is about four miles northwest of the Hampstead Farm Archaeological District, the site of a significant collection of Native American prehistoric and historic settlement remains.

Like most of Orange County and the Piedmont, a thriving tobacco-based plantation economy built upon slavery developed during the Colonial era of white settlement and antebellum homes, including Glendale, Carolton, Edgewood and Springdale, remain near Scuffletown.

Nearby are cemeteries of enslaved peoples. About a mile and a half south and slightly west of Scuffletown, on Albano Rd., is Lewis Town, one of eight documented "Freetown" communities where formerly enslaved African Americans settled in Orange County after the American Civil War.

Scuffletown doesn't appear on most 19th century maps though it is understood to have been named in the late 19th-early 20th centuries; its nearest neighboring communities are Dawsonville to the west in Greene County and Somerset and Liberty Mills, lying to the east. A 1911 newspaper makes reference to a "Scuffletown nine" baseball club. Bowman's was the name of a general store in Scuffletown in the 1940s.

Scuffletown is immediately south of historical geographical points on the Rapidan River, the northernmost boundary of Orange County that, beginning at Scuffletown, runs in a generally southwest to northeast direction. The points on the Rapidan were known as "Wilhoit's Mill" (also "Wilhite's Ford”), "Willis' Ford" and "White's Ford" in the 19th century. A sand beach along the banks of the Rapidan River at Wilhoit's Ford was advertised in a 1933 issue of The Orange County Review.

Today, a road named White's Lane runs east from near the Rapidan River toward State Route 231 into Madison County.

=== John White ===
John Conyers White (1696-1787), the emigrant of Leicestershire, purchased land in about 1745 near the intersection of the Rapidan and South Rivers in today's Greene County.

About five miles to the east near today's Scuffletown, on July 1, 1767 White expanded his holdings on the Rapidan River. That was the day that parts of the 24,000-acre Octonia Grant were auctioned off, whose westernmost boundary is the remaining Octonia Stone. Clerk for the sale was James Madison, Sr., father of the future president of the United States.

John White bought lot #4 of this tract, an area of 356 acres, for 75 pounds. White made a cash payment of 49 pounds, and by June 22, 1769, he had paid the full price to Mr. Madison.

The ford across the Rapidan River in the area of the tract was known as White's Ford. Several fords appear in accounts of regiment movements during the American Civil War. Wilhoit's Mill was likely named for Curtis Wilhoit (1809-1885).

Carolton is said to be the former tobacco plantation of the White family, today located on a 180-acre tract of land to the east of Scuffletown along the Rapidan River where it meanders in sharp curves to the south. Part of the existing house was erected in 1776 by the family. John White died in 1787 and his son Thomas White succeeded before migrating to northeastern Georgia in 1792. The home was said to have been in the family until 1830 after which Jacob Walters acquired it, and later, John R. Brooking (1832-1864), who was killed in the Civil War.

To the east of the house is a noted Indian burial mound dating to the year 1440 A.D., with indications of human activity in the area dating to 660 A.D. Archeologists estimate that remains of as many as 2000 people had been buried over time in the Rapidan Mound, making it the largest Native American burial site in Virginia.

Nearby is an ancient village site called "Stegara" that appears on the 1612 map made from the observations of Captain John Smith on his 1608 journey. Scientists have since recovered arrow-points, axes, smoking pipes and other objects. Known as the "Stegaraki" people, they were a tribe of the Manahoac Confederacy.

To the north of the house at Carolton is a small building that was used as a granary and said to be an early church, both the early "Anglican Mountain Chapel" of the 1720s and a late 18th-century chapel, likely used by a Baptist congregation.

=== Name origin ===
The origin of the name Scuffletown is unclear though a few miles to the southeast in Albemarle County is another area of the same name, in the Southwest Mountains Rural Historic District, where Black residents were exploited by the sharecropping system that replaced chattel slavery after the American Civil War. There was an 18th-century tavern and community near Richmond by this name, now a pocket park. There is a Scuffletown in North Carolina, founded in the 1700s when Native American farmers were forced off their land, retreating into the "sandy, swampy lands in the vicinity of the Lumber River, where they were joined by runaway enslaved Africans." While no families possess the Scuffle name, the origin of the name "Scuffletown Road" is said "that the people that who lived here were thought to have to scuffle to make a living."
