= Sappony =

State-recognized tribe in North Carolina, United States

Sappony High Plains Indians
- Official seal of the Sappony
- Named after: Saponi people
- Formation: 1997 (nonprofit)
- Type: state-recognized tribe, nonprofit organization
- Tax ID no.: EIN 56-1966338
- Legal status: Trade associations; business and community development organization; arts, culture, and humanities nonprofit, chariy
- Headquarters: Virgilina, Virginia
- Location: Roxboro, North Carolina, United States
- Members: 850
- Official language: English
- Executive Director: Dante Desiderio
- Treasurer: Charlene Martin
- Revenue: $542,461 (2024)
- Expenses: $489,519 (2024)
- Funding: grants, contributions, investment income and dividends
- Website: sappony.org
- Formerly called: Indians of Person County and Cherokee-Powhatan Indian Association

The Sappony are a state-recognized tribe in North Carolina, United States. They claim descent from the historic Saponi people, a Tutelo-speaking tribe who occupied the Piedmont of North Carolina and Virginia. They share kin relationships with free people of color, such as the Melungeons.

In 1911, the North Carolina state legislature first identified the Indians of Person County or Person County Indians. They are based in Roxboro, the seat of Person County, North Carolina.

The Sappony are not federally recognized as a Native American tribe. They petitioned for recognition twice: in 1984 as Cherokee and in 2001 as Saponi.

== Nonprofit organization ==
In 1996, the Sappony formed a 501(c)(3) nonprofit organization named the High Plains Indians.

In 2024, Dante Desiderio served as the High Plains Indians' executive director, and Charlene Martin served as the treasurer.

Their 2024 revenue was approximately $542,461, and expenses were $489,519. Their 2024 assets were approximately $2.15 million. Contributions comprised 98.6% of their revenue, while investment income made up 1.4%.

== Administration ==
In 2024, the administration of the Sappony was as follows.

- Otis K. Martin, Tribal Chief
- Dorothy Stewart Yates, Chairperson
- Charlene Y. Martin, Treasurer
- Teryn Emily Brewington, Secretary
- Dante Desiderio, Executive Director
- Seven Elected Family Representatives

Board members include Jennifer Talley Ash, Angela Martin Caudle, Krystal Stewart Glasscock, Tonda Coleman Huddleston , William T. Paul, Curtis Shepherd, and Kara Stewart.

== History ==
The ancestors of the Sappony were initially classed as free Black people, before being designated as Cubans or Indians. Following the precedent of the Lumbee, the group initially referred to themselves as Croatan Indians in order to acquire funding for separate Indian schools.

In a 1911 revision of a 1905 law, North Carolina described them as "Indians", and stated "the persons residing in Person County supposed to be descendants of a friendly tribes of Indians and White's Lost Colony, once residing in the eastern portion of this State, and known as 'Cubans,' and their descendants, shall be known and designated as the Indians of Person County."

== Activities ==
The Sappony have three active programs: the Sappony Sovereign Continuity Project, Cultural Heritage Youth Outreach Programs, and Economic and Community Development Programs.

== See also ==
- Haliwa-Saponi Indian Tribe
- Occaneechi Band of the Saponi Nation
- Racial isolates in the United States
  - Brandywine people
  - Delaware Moors
  - Dominickers
  - Lumbee
  - Melungeons
