= Nikonha =

Last full-blooded speaker of Tutelo language

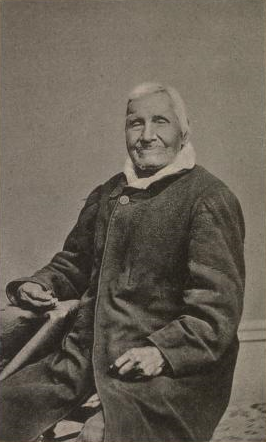
Nikonha, photographed in 1870

Nikonha, also known as Waskiteng and Mosquito (c. 1765–1871), was known as the last full-blooded speaker of Tutelo, a Siouan language formerly spoken in Virginia. He is reported to have been around 106 years old when he died at Six Nations of the Grand River First Nation, Ontario in 1871, where his people had been forced to flee with the Cayuga because of the American Revolutionary War.

In 1870, the year before his death, Nikonha was visited by the American-Canadian ethnologist Horatio Hale, who was seeking to learn about the languages of the mixed peoples at the Reserve. He described Nikonha as follows, when discussing his findings at an 1883 conference on languages:

His appearance, as we first saw him, basking in the sunshine on the slope before his cabin, confirmed the reports, which I had heard, both of his great age and of his marked intelligence. "A wrinkled, smiling countenance, a high forehead, half-shut eyes, white hair, a scanty, stubby beard, fingers bent with age like a bird's claws" is the description recorded in my note-book. Not only in physiognomy, but also in demeanor and character, he differed strikingly from the grave and composed Iroquois among whom he dwelt. The lively, mirthful disposition of his race survived in full force in its latest member. His replies to our inquiries were intermingled with many jocose remarks, and much good-humored laughter.

Nikonha told Hale that his father had been a Tutelo leader named Onusowa. His mother had died when he was a child, and he was raised by her brother, his maternal uncle, as his people had a matrilineal kinship system. Children were considered born to their mother's family and clan, and were reared largely by her people. Nikonha's people had gradually migrated north out of Virginia.

By the time Nikonha was approximately 14, in 1779, his Tutelo people had been adoptive members of the Haudenosaunee Confederacy under the Cayuga living in the village of Coreorgonel, New York, near the current location of Ithaca. The Cayuga are one of the six nations of the Haudenosaunee Confederacy responsible for adoptive nations alongside the Oneida. All these nations are speakers of Iroquoian languages. The village was destroyed in 1779 by an army led by Colonel Dearborn during the Americans' Sullivan Expedition of the Revolutionary War. The village was one of 40 Haudenosaunee villages razed, and the Expedition also destroyed most of the winter crops stored by the Cayuga. The Tutelo survivors fled north with the Cayuga and other Haudenosaunee, settling on land granted to them by the Crown at Grand River in Ontario.

Nikonha served with the British and their allies against the United States in the War of 1812. They had some hopes of expelling the Americans from former Haudenosaunee territory. His wife was Cayuga. He had spoken only the Cayuga language at home for years, after learning it as a youth.

As Hale worked with him, Nikonha was able to provide about 100 words of the Tutelo language of his youth. Hale was collecting information on Tutelo from the few surviving individuals who had preserved any knowledge of it. Aside from Nikonha, the other speakers mixed their Tutelo more often with Cayuga.

On the basis of the vocabulary and grammar that Hale collected and analyzed, he later confirmed the classification of Tutelo as a Siouan language. It is related to Dakota and Hidatsa, languages of tribes located mostly west of the Mississippi River. There were also historically many other closely related nations in Appalachia and the Piedmont of the American east coast.
