= Stegara =

- Village
- Stegara
- Seat: King's house

Stegara was a historic Manahoac town in what is present-day Orange County, Virginia, on the right bank of the Rapidan River. The Rapidan Mound is associated with this town. John Smith referred to the people of Stegara as "Stegarakes" in his 1624 account. Stegara was located about 15 miles from the Saponi village of Monasukapanough.

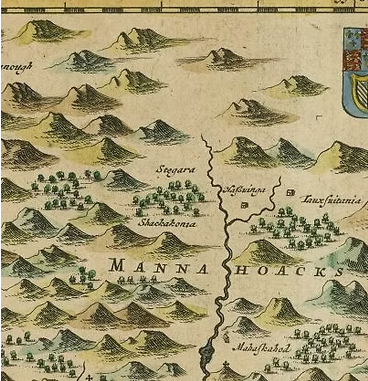
Detail from Nova Virginiae Tabula showing the town of Stegara near the Rapidan River
