= Eno people =

American Indian tribe

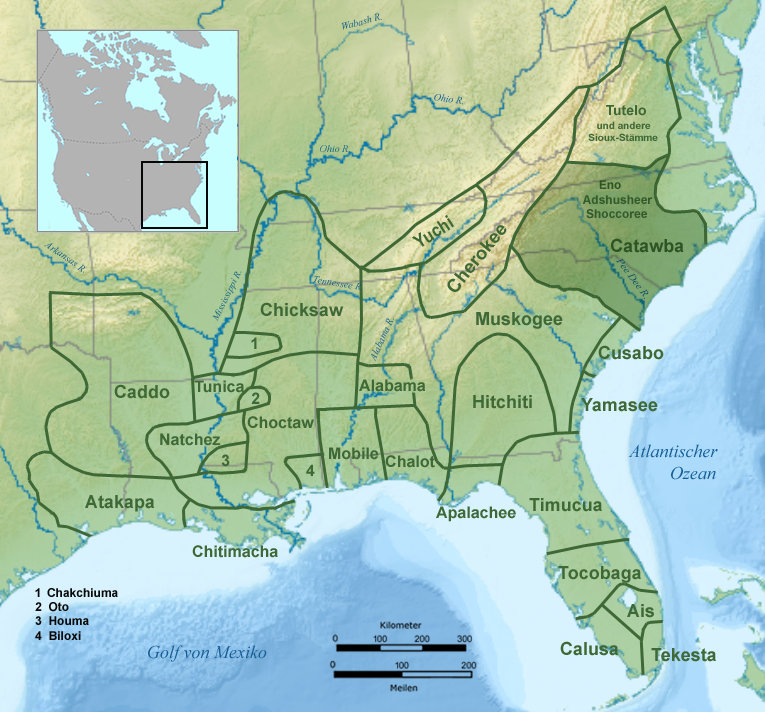
- Tribal territory of Eno-Shoccoree-Adshusheer during the late 17th century.

Total population
- Extinct; Assimilated into Catawba and Saponi.

Regions with significant populations
- Virginia, later Eno River and possibly Flat River in North Carolina Possibly Enoree River in South Carolina.

Languages
- Unclassified, thought to have spoken a distinct Shoccoree-Eno language.

Religion
- Native American religion

Related ethnic groups
- Shakori, Catawba

The Eno or Enoke, also called Stuckenock, was an American Indian tribe located in North Carolina during the 17th and 18th centuries that was later absorbed into the Catawba tribe in South Carolina along with various other smaller tribal bands.

== Name ==
While the exact meaning of the Eno people's name is unknown, the anthropologist Frank Speck suggested the synonym Haynokes, as recorded by Francis Yeardley in 1654, could relate the meaning to i'nare, "to dislike" or yeⁿni'nare, "people disliked". Linguist Blair A. Rudes later alternatively proposed that Eno derives from ènu, the Catawba word for "little crow".

== History ==
The Enos were first mentioned in historic documents by William Strachey (the first secretary of the colony of Virginia) in his early-17th century book The Historie of Travaile Into Virginia Britannia. Strachey mentions the "Anoeg" to the southwest of the Powhatan Confederacy (centered near present-day Richmond, Virginia) "whose howses are built as ours, ten daies distant from us..." Another early mention is in a May 1654 letter from Francis Yeardley (an Indian trader from Virginia) to John Ferrar (deputy treasurer of the Virginia Company, in Huntingdonshire, England); the letter was published in 1911 in Narratives of Early Carolina (1650–1708) by Alexander S. Salley as Francis Yeardley's Narrative of Incursions into Carolina, 1654. In his letter, Yeardley wrote that a Tuscaroran had described to him a "great nation" called the "Haynokes" who had "valiantly resisted the Spaniards further northern attempts".

The village of "Œnock" in the Piedmont of North Carolina was visited by John Lederer in 1670. Lederer reported that the Enos' town

...is built round a field, where in their Sports they exercise with so much labour and violence, and in so great numbers, that I have seen the ground wet with the sweat that dropped from their bodies: their chief Recreation is Slinging of stones. They are of mean stature and courage, covetous and thievish, industrious to earn a peny; and therefore hire themselves out to their neighbours, who employ them as Carryers or Porters. They plant abundance of Grain, reap three Crops in a Summer, and out of their Granary supply all the adjacent parts. [They] build not their houses of Bark, but of Watling and Plaister. In Summer, the heat of the weather makes them chuse to lie abroad in the night under thin arbours of wilde Palm. Some houses they have of Reed and Bark; they build them generally round: to each house belongs a little hovel made like an oven, where they lay up their Corn and Mast, and keep it dry. They parch their Nuts and Acorns over the fire, to take away their rank Oyliness; which afterwards pressed, yeeld a milky liquor, and the Acorns an Amber-colour’d Oyl. In these, mingled together, they dip their Cakes at great Entertainments, and so serve them up to their guests as an extraordinary dainty. Their Government is Democratic; and the Sentences of their old men are received as Laws, or rather Oracles, by them.

James Needham and Gabriel Arthur also traveled through "Aeno", described as "an Indian towne two dayes jorny beyond Occhoneeche [Island in Virginia]", on their way to trade with the Cherokees in 1673.

In 1701, English adventurer John Lawson traveled from the coast of South Carolina, north into North Carolina, and then to the coast near Washington, North Carolina. In his book A New Voyage to Carolina, Lawson reports that the "Nation of Adshusheer" (located near present-day Durham, North Carolina, and likely represented by North Carolina archaeological site 31Or13) had confederated with the Shakori and the Eno. He said their village was known as Adshusheer.

Lawson traveled east from Achonechy (Occaneechi Town, located near present-day Hillsborough, North Carolina) "through several other Streams, which empty themselves into the Branches of Cape-Fair" with Enoe Will, "their chief Man", who "rules as far as the Banks of Reatkin" (the Haw River). Lawson further described the location of Adshusheer, where nearby "There runs a pretty Rivulet by this Town. Near the Plantation, I saw a prodigious overgrown Pine-Tree, having not seen any of that Sort of Timber for above 125 Miles". He, similar to Lederer, described the inhabitants of the village as "much addicted to a Sport they call Chenco, which is carry'd on with a Staff and a Bowl made of Stone, which they trundle upon a smooth Place, like a Bowling-Green, made for that Purpose, as I have mention'd before."

In 1712, John Barnwell, a government official from South Carolina, traveled across North Carolina with a military expedition against the Tuscarora in eastern North Carolina. The expedition produced a map, created c. 1712-1725, that shows "Acconeechy Old Towns" on what appears to be New Hope Creek. This may depict the former site of Adshusheer.

By the early 18th century, the Enos, combined with the Shakoris, Tutelos, Saponis, Keyauwee, and Occaneechis, were reduced to a population of approximately 750 people. About 1715, the Enos merged with the Catawbas in the North Carolina-South Carolina border area; the Enos became "member elements of the Catawba" perhaps due to the outcome of the Yamassee War, in which the Enos may or may not have participated. It is, however, "extremely unlikely" that the Enos "could have constituted a significant portion" of the Catawba Nation. The Enoree River in South Carolina appears to have been named for the Enos, "ree" being the equivalent of the word "the". The Eno River in North Carolina is also named for them.

In 1716, Virginia Lieutenant Governor Alexander Spotswood proposed to resettle the Eno (along with the Saras and Keyauwees) at "Eno Town", presumably either on the Neuse River or in the Albemarle area of North Carolina; By 1716 the Enos for the most part had merged with the Catawba in South Carolina. They in whole or in part may have re-migrated to northern North Carolina with the Saponis in the 1730s. The Eno dialect was still spoken within the Catawba as late as 1743.

== Historic Eno variations ==
- "Anoeg", William Strachey, 1612
- "Haynokes", Francis Yeardley, 1654
- "Oenock" and "Œnock", John Lederer, 1670
- "Aeno", James Needham and Gabriel Arthur, 1673
- "Enoe", John Lawson, 1701
- "Eenó", James Adair, 1743
- "Enos", James Mooney, 1894
- "Enoch"
