= Francis Emmet Buford =

American judge and politician ()

Francis Emmitt Buford

Member of the Virginia House of Delegates from Brunswick County
- In office December 6, 1893 – December 3, 1895
- Preceded by: H.E. Young
- Succeeded by: Richard Simmons Powell Jr.

Personal details
- Born: November 17, 1836 Brunswick County, Virginia
- Died: March 15, 1909 (aged 72) "Sherwood", Freeman, Brunswick County, Virginia
- Resting place: Sherwood cemetery
- Spouse: Martha (Pattie) Stone Hicks
- Children: 4 sons including Emmet, Edward P., Frank and Robert Pegram Buford, 2 daughters
- Parent: William Pegram Buford (father)
- Education: College of William and Mary
- Alma mater: University of Virginia School of Law
- Occupation: lawyer, judge, politician, military officer

Military service
- Allegiance: Virginia; CSA
- Branch/service: artillery
- Years of service: 1861-1862
- Rank: captain
- Unit: Battery E, 3rd Virginia Artillery

Francis Emmet Buford (November 17, 1836 – March 15, 1909) was a Virginia attorney, politician, military officer, judge and newspaper publisher who served a term in the Virginia House of Delegates representing his native Brunswick County, Virginia.

== Early and family life ==
The first born of a dozen children of the former Lucy Ann Rice (1817–1895) and her husband William Pegram Buford (1807–1868). His father farmed using enslaved labor at "Farmington" in Brunswick County and like his wife survived the American Civil War. William P. Buford served as the Brunswick county sheriff for many years, and his father (this man's grandfather), Abraham Buford of Lunenburg County to the southwest, had served as captain during the War of 1812. This man could trace his paternal ancestry to John Beaufort or Buford, who in 1635 emigrated to then barely developed Lancaster County in the Northern Neck of the relatively new colony, but whose descendants moved to the southwest. His mother was the daughter of Col. William Rice of Brunswick County. Buford had at least two younger brothers who never married. James Rice Buford (1845–1913) served as a Confederate cavalryman and courier during the conflict and remained in Brunswick County, but Preston Buford (1856–1930, who was too young to serve) moved to near Winston-Salem in Caswell County, North Carolina with his schoolteacher sister Jennie and possibly with his brother Charlie and youngest sister Frances Rice Buford. Their sister Margaret Susan Buford (1841–1910) cared for her mother and then father at Farmington east of Lawrenceville, and outlived her sisters Lelia Fitzwilliam Buford Robins (1839–1906) who married after the conflict and moved to Gloucester County, Virginia, and possibly Mary Elizabeth Buford Phillips (1843–unknown) who married and became active in the United Daughters of the Confederacy in New York City while living with one of her daughters in New Jersey.

In any event Francis Emmet Buford received an education appropriate to his class. He attended the College of William and Mary in Williamsburg in 1853, then the University of Virginia Law School in Charlottesville.

== Personal life ==
In 1858 Buford married Martha (Pattie) Stone Hicks, granddaughter of lawyer and former North Carolina judge and Governor David Stone. Her father was prominent Brunswick County lawyer Edward Hicks. Her mother had died when Pattie was very young, and she was raised by her aunt Martha, and both women took care of her father when he became an invalid. Although herself later subject to a long illness (as was this man her husband), Pattie was a strong-willed woman, and one rumor claimed she married in order to circumvent a clause in her father's will which would have given her brother David control of her marriage. Francis and Pattie Buford had four sons and two daughters who reached adulthood, of whom Emmet (1861–1910) was the eldest but Edward P. Buford (1865–1931) outlived his male siblings and followed his father's path into the law and legislature. His brother Frank (1868–1910) helped and briefly succeeded their father as editor of the Brunswick Gazette. Their sister Elizabeth (1863–1951) married Rev. Robert Strange Jr. (who became bishop of East Carolina but left her a widow so she returned to Lawrenceville) and outlived her siblings, and their sister Mary (1884–1922) married Dr. Robert Martin of Petersburg, but died in Richmond.

== Career ==
Buford was admitted to the bar and began practicing in Brunswick County in December 1857, and in 1865, as the Civil War ended, was elected the commonwealth attorney (prosecutor) for the county. He served 15 years before legislators elected him to the county court, and discharged his duties with dignity and impartiality until retiring in 1892 from both the bench and the practice of law. After retiring from the bench, Buford edited the Brunswick Gazette.

Like his father, who died shortly after the American Civil War, Buford also farmed using enslaved labor. In the 1860 census, he owned 13 slaves (six of them women and girls - aged 60, 30(2), 13, 9 and 6 years, as well as seven men and boys - aged 33, 30(2), 17, 16, 13 and 9 years old.

During the American Civil War, Buford was Captain of Company G of the 3rd Virginia Artillery, which helped defend Richmond but was disbanded in May 1862 after 29 of its members died of disease. Capt. Buford also became ill and long suffered lingering effects, and continued as one of Brunswick County's Special Police through the conflict. His younger brother James Rice Buford (who never married) served with the 3rd Virginia Cavalry and later became involved with the United Confederate Veterans, and often told of his courier services for C.S.A. Gen. J.E.B. Stuart during the conflict.

Buford built "Sherwood" on land Patty inherited from her father in the Totaro district of Brunswick County. They would also build a school which after the Civil War served as the Hospital of the Good Shepherd across the road (technically in Brodnax). Virginia legislators elected Buford a judge for Brunswick County in or before 1885, and he served until resigning to run for the state legislature, replaced as judge by Needham S. Turnbull in 1891. In 1893, after Buford resigned as judge, and as his son Edward served as the county's commonwealth attorney, Brunswick County voters elected Buford as their (part-time) representative in the Virginia House of Delegates, and he served a single term before being replaced by R.S. Powell, who would in turn be replaced by Buford's son Edward P. Buford.

== Death and legacy ==
Buford survived his wife and their youngest son (who both died in 1900) but died in 1909, survived by several children and grandchildren (although several siblings and children would die in 1910). He is buried in the family graveyard at Sherwood. Sherwood remains, as does the former Hospital of the Good Shepard, which is now on the Virginia Civil Rights in Education trail, and is currently operated as a bed and breakfast.
