= Saponi =

Indigenous people of the Northeastern Woodlands

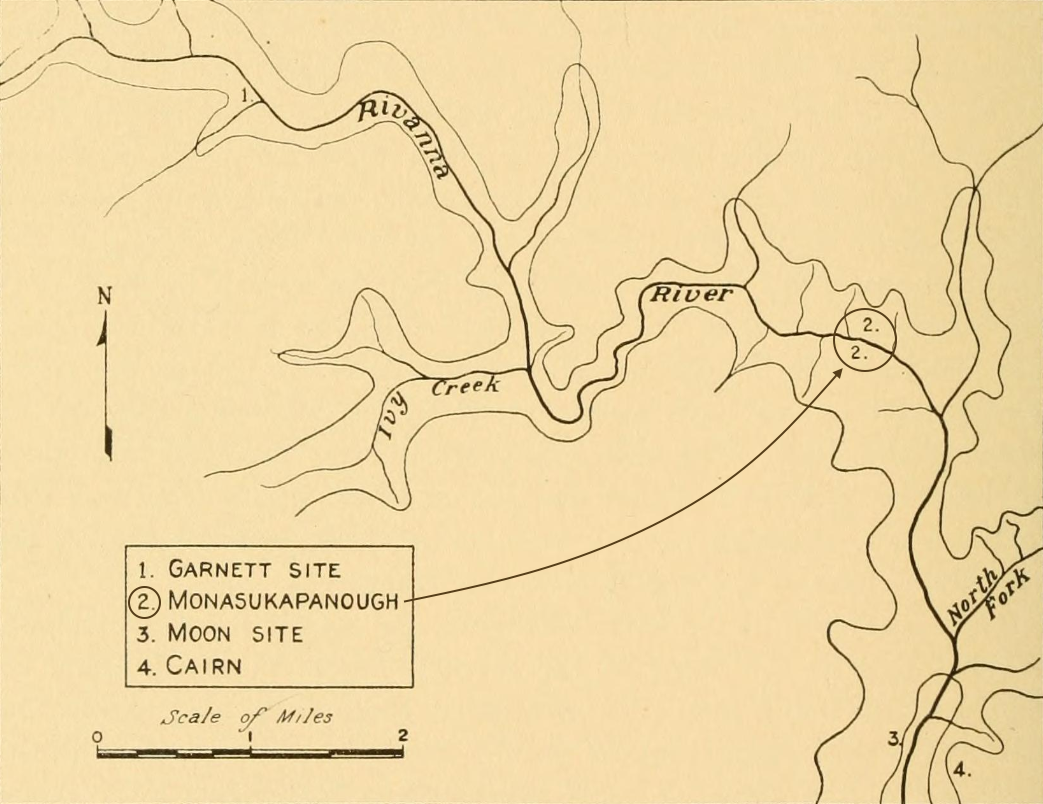
- Monasukapanough on the Rivanna River in Virginia. James Mooney wrote of his belief it was a Saponi settlement.

Regions with significant populations
- Virginia and North Carolina (historically); Pennsylvania and New York, by mid-18th century

Languages
- English, formerly Saponi

Religion
- Christianity, Indigenous religion

Related ethnic groups
- Tutelo, Occaneechi, Monacan, Manahoac

The Saponi are a Native American tribe historically based in the Piedmont of North Carolina and Virginia. They possibly spoke a Siouan-Catawban language, related to the languages of the Tutelo, Biloxi, and Ofo.

They were part of the Monacan confederacies. Saponi and Tutelo were both called Nahyssan. The Cayuga adopted the Saponi into the League of the Haudenosaunee in 1753.

== Name ==
The origin and meaning of Saponi, sometimes spelled Sappony, is debated. American anthropologist John Reed Swanton wrote that Saponi was "a corruption of Monasiccapano or Monasukapanough." He wrote the name came from moni-seep meaning "shallow water." University of Kansas linguist Robert L. Rankin also suggested that their name derived from sa:p moni meaning "shallow water" or sa:p oni: meaning "shallow tree."

Ethnographer James Mooney suggested the word might come from the term sapa meaning "black."

German explorer John Lederer suggested their name came from Sepy, a female immortal in their religion. He wrote that either four tribes or clans were named for this spirit and three other closely related female spirits from whom the Saponi believed they descended. Evidence came from a short list of names given by the missionary Samuel Kirkland.

== Language ==
The Saponi language is known from only two sources. One is the list of 46 terms and phrases of the tribes living at Fort Christanna recorded by John Fontaine at in 1716. The other is William Byrd II's History of the Dividing Line betwixt Virginia and North Carolina (1728), in which he recorded names of local creeks. Byrd's list has been found to have included several names from unrelated tribes.

=== Scholarly analysis ===
The Saponi language, now extinct, is written by some to be a Siouan-Catawban language similar to Tutelo. This is due to the word list recorded at Fort Christanna possessing a mixture of Siouan and Algonquian words. David H. Pentland said an 1870 statement of Tutelo and Saponi being able to understand each other occurred only after both of their languages had ceased usage.

There were five tribes at Fort Christanna, the Tutelo, Saponi, Occaneechi, Meipontski, (Note: In 1971, historian Edward P. Alexander suggested the Meipontski could be a remnant of the Manahoac.) and Stuckanox. Pentland wrote that the Siouan words in the list could have come from any of the other four tribes. He suggested the word list documented a trade jargon, and that Saponi possibly spoke an unrelated language. Brooke Bauer writes the Saponi spoke a Catawban language.

== Territory ==
James Mooney wrote the site of Monasukapanough was possibly the "original" site of the Saponi. At the time of European contact up to the early 18th century, the Saponi lived in present-day Virginia and North Carolina. Their settlements extended into the New River in West Virginia. In the 17th and 18th centuries, some Saponi settled along the Roanoke River, its tributary the Staunton River, and the Yadkin River. Lands in the Virginia Piedmont were dominated by oak, hickory, and pine forests. In the mid-18th century, most surviving Saponi migrated to Pennsylvania and New York. Others merged with the Iswa.

Their primary town was called Saponi. In 1670 Lederer visited their nearby settlement, Pintahae, near present-day Lynchburg, Virginia.

== Culture ==
The Saponi lived in a matrilineal society. They had settled villages and built houses of post-and-pole frames with central hearths. In the 17th century, men wore breechclouts and women wore deerhide aprons. Important leaders, such as medicine men, wore feather cloaks. British explorer John Lawson wrote that the Saponi were governed by a headman, an elders' council, and, when necessary, a war chief.

Historically, Saponi people hunted deer, bear, beaver, squirrel, turkey, and other fowl. They may have hunted woodland bison and elk. They fished in rivers and the Atlantic Ocean. They farmed maize, beans, and squash and harvested wild plants including various nuts, berries, and stone fruits. Chiefs used staffs of hickory wood.

== History ==
=== 17th century ===
In 1600, James Mooney estimated there were 2,700 Saponi. English explorer Edward Bland wrote in 1650 about the "Occononacheans and Nessoneicks" living on Roanoke River. The "Nessoneicks" were Saponi. In 1670, John Lederer visited what he described as "Sapon, a Village of the Nahyssans," who were the Saponi. Lederer wrote about the Saponi: "The nation is governed by an absolute Monarch; the People of a high stature, warlike and rich."

In 1671, Thomas Batts and Robert Fallam led an expedition that passed through several Saponi villages. After their visit, the Saponi and Tutelo moved downriver and settled with Occaneechi people. Nathanial Bacon led an attack against the tribes in 1676. This move was likely to avoid increasing attacks from Haudenosaunee people.

Nearly decimated, the Saponi relocated to three islands at the confluence of the Dan and Staunton rivers in Clarksville with their allies, the Occaneechi, Tutelo, and Nahyssans.

In 1677, the Virginia colonial government named the Saponi as tributary Indians under the colonial governor's protection.

=== 18th century ===
English explorer John Lawson wrote about the Saponi in 1701. He noted they fought against the Seneca and trapped beaver for the fur trade. Shortly after his visit, the Saponi migrated to North Carolina. A band of Saponi returned to Virginia in 1708. There Occaneechi and Stukanox joined them.

By 1701, the Saponi and allied tribes, often collectively referred to as the Nahyssan, had begun moving to the location of present-day Salisbury, North Carolina to gain distance from the colonial frontier. By 1711 they were just east of the Roanoke River and west of modern Windsor, North Carolina. In 1712, they asked Virginia to prohibit alcohol sales in their settlement.

In 1714, Alexander Spotswood, governor of the Colony of Virginia, resettled them in an Indian Reservation at Fort Christanna near Gholsonville, Virginia. The tribes agreed to this for protection from hostile Haudenosaunee. In 1716, the combined Saponi, Tutelo, and Manahoac population at the reservation was 200. Although in 1718 the House of Burgesses voted to abandon the fort and school, the tribes continued to stay in that area for some time. They gradually moved away in small groups over the years 1730 to 1750. One record from 1728 indicated that Colonel William Byrd II made a survey of the border between Virginia and North Carolina, guided by Ned Bearskin, a Saponi hunter. Byrd noted several abandoned fields of corn, indicating serious disturbance among the local tribes.

Hostilities between the Haudenosaunee and the Saponi and their neighbors ceased with the signing of the 1722 Treaty of Albany.

In 1740, the majority of the Saponi and Tutelo moved to Shamokin in Pennsylvania. In 1753, the Cayuga people adopted them into their nation during the Grand Council of the Haudenosaunee. In 1711 the majority of Saponi migrated with the Cayuga to near Ithaca, New York, while some remained in Pennsylvania until 1778. Others merged into the Iswa.

A band with 28 adult Saponi remained near Granville County, North Carolina until 1755.

In 1765, Saponi settled at Tioga Point, where the Chemung River joins the Susquehanna River in north-central Pennsylvania. They also settled as Pony Hollow, just southwest of Newfield, New York, which connected to other Nahyssan and Haudenosaunee communities nearby. "Pony Hollow" is a corruption of Saponi Hollow. An estimated 30 Saponi warriors lived among these communities.

Shortly after the American Revolutionary War, Samuel Kirkland noted a community of them living near Fort Niagara who was later believed to have joined the Mohawk, whereas others continued into Canada alongside the Cayuga. Since most of the Haudenosaunee sided with the British in the American Revolutionary War, after the victory by the United States, the Saponi and Tutelo who had joined the Haudenosaunee were forced with them into exile in Canada. After that point, recorded history was silent about the tribe.

Americans destroyed Saponi communities in Pennsylvania and New York in 1779. In 1779, most of the Saponi were driven to Fort Niagara, where the Saponi separated from the Tutelo, who migrated north to Ontario, Canada. Those Saponi settled in Seneca County, New York in 1780. and they were forced to cede their lands to the state of New York in 1789, but some remained in the Cayuga homelands.

Distinct from the Person County Indians, a group of Saponi who remained in North Carolina merged with the Tuscarora, Meherrin, and Machapunga and migrated north into New York with them by 1802.

== State-recognized tribes ==
North Carolina has three state-recognized tribes that claim to descend from the historical Saponi people. They are not currently federally recognized as Native American tribes.

They are:

1. Haliwa-Saponi Indian Tribe, based in Halifax and Warren counties
2. Occaneechi Band of the Saponi Nation, based in Mebane, North Carolina, organized in 1984 as the Eno-Occaneechi Indian Association, added Saponi to its name in 1995, state-recognized in 2002
3. Sappony, based in Roxboro, North Carolina, recognized by North Carolina in 1911 as the Indians of Person County. In 2003 they changed their name to Sappony.

== Unrecognized organizations ==
A number of unrecognized organizations claim Saponi ancestry. These include the Mahenips Band of the Saponi Nation of Missouri in the Ozark Hills, with headquarters in West Plains, Missouri. In 2000, the Saponi Nation of Missouri submitted a letter of intent to Petition for Federal Acknowledgement of Existence as an Indian Tribe; however, they did not follow through with submitting a petition.

Ohio is home to the second-largest population of people who claim Saponi ancestry. Saponi is a preferred Native American identity among triracial isolates. Ohio has no federally recognized or state-recognized tribes. Director of the Haliwa-Saponi Historic Legacy Project, Dr. Marty Richardson wrote, "A large group of Meadows Indians migrated to Ohio after 1835 and took advantage of fewer race-based restrictions." However, 1818 to 1842 marked Indian removals in Ohio. In 1998, a group called Saponi Nation of Ohio submitted a letter of intent to petition for recognition; however, they never submitted a completed petition. Researcher Andre Kearns states some descendants of the early free African-American Cumbo family later adopted Native American identity, self-identifying as Saponi.

== See also ==
- Catawba
- Cheraw
- Cherokee
- Cusabo
- Massawomeck
- Muscogee
- Piscataway
- Sewee
- Stegara
- Yuchi

== Bibliography ==
- Demallie, Raymond J., "Tutelo and Neighboring Groups," in Handbook of North American Indians, Volume 14: Southeast, ed. Raymond D. Fogelson (Washington, DC: Smithsonian Institution, 2004), 286–300.
- Swanton, John Reed (1952). The Indian Tribes of North America. Genealogical Publishing Com. p. 74. ISBN 9780806317304.
- Vest, Jay Hansford C. (Winter–Spring 2005). "An Odyssey among the Iroquois: A History of Tutelo Relations in New York". American Indian Quarterly. 29 (1–2): 124–55. doi:10.1353/aiq.2005.0072. JSTOR 4138803.
- Bauer, Brooke M. (2023). Frank, Andrew K.; Hudson, Angela Pulley; Ray, Kristofer (eds.). Becoming Catawba: Catawba Indian Women and Nation-Building, 1540–1840. Indians and Southern History. Tuscaloosa, AL: The University of Alabama Press. ISBN 978-0- 8173- 9427- 1. OCLC 1350429789.
- Pentland, David H. (December 1, 1996). "The Southern Algonquians and Their Neighbours". In Pentland, David H. (ed.). Papers of the Twenty-Seventh Algonquian Conference. Algonquian Conference. Vol. 27. East Lansing, MI: Michigan State University Press.
