= Occaneechi Band of the Saponi Nation =

State-recognized tribe in North Carolina, United States

- Official seal of the Occaneechi Band of the Saponi Nation
- Named after: Occaneechi and Saponi people, Eno River
- Formation: 1984, 1996 (nonprofit)
- Type: state-recognized tribe, nonprofit organization
- Tax ID no.: EIN 56-1906889
- Legal status: Arts, culture, and humanities nonprofit, charity
- Purpose: A23: Cultural, Ethnic Awareness
- Location: Mebane, North Carolina, United States
- Members: 2,000+ (2018)
- Official language: English
- President: Vickie Jeffries
- Website: obsn.org

The Occaneechi Band of the Saponi Nation is a state-recognized tribe in North Carolina.

They first formed as the Eno Occaneechi Indian Association in 1984 but changed their name in 1994. They claim descent from the historic Occaneechi, Saponi, and other eastern Siouan language-speaking Indians who occupied the Piedmont of North Carolina and Virginia.

The tribe maintains an office in Mebane, where it carries out programs to benefit more than 2,000 members. John "Blackfeather" Jeffries (d. 2023) of Hillsborough, North Carolina, served as chairperson for many years.

== History ==
=== Historical tribes ===
Limited documentation exists linking members of the tribe to the historical Occaneechi and Saponi tribes. After warfare in the Southeast in the 18th century, most of the remaining Saponi tribe members went north. In 1740, Saponi migrated to Shamokin in Pennsylvania to join the Haudenosaunee Confederacy where they would have protection from the other League members. In 1711, the majority of Saponi migrated with their Cayuga guardians to near Ithaca, New York, while some remained in Pennsylvania until 1778. After the American Revolution, they fled with the rest of the Haudenosaunee to Canada, as they were allies of the British.

=== Modern history ===
Families ancestral to the Occaneechi Band were previously referred to as Portuguese and Croatan. They descend from the "Texas Settlement" of 1820, a triracial settlement in North Carolina. Academic J. Lorand Matory states the predecessors of the Occaneechi Band are the result of internal splits within triracial isolate families. Some families ancestral to the Band are the Jeffries, Bunch, Haitcock, Whitmore, Steward, and Watkin families. Members of the "Texas Community" petitioned for a separate school from the local Black school in 1930s, but were rejected by Alamance County. (Note: One member of the community was noted to not have signed, due to his suspicion his children with a Black woman would not be admitted.) Noting their dress and dance forms were borrowed from Plains Indians, Matory proposes they utilized powwows as a method to perform their worthiness to be recognized as Native American.

== Nonprofit organization ==
In 1996, the Occaneechi Band of the Saponi Nation formed a 501(c)(3) nonprofit organization, and Vickie Jeffries serves as the organization's principal officer. Its mission is "to bring awareness and recognition of the Occaneechi Indians."

== State-recognition ==
The state of North Carolina formalized its recognition process for Native American tribes and created the North Carolina Commission of Indian Affairs (NCCIA) in 1971. In January 1990, as the Eno Occaneechi Indian Association, the Occaneechi Band petitioned the NCCIA for state recognition but in 1995, the NCCIA's recognition committee denied recognition to the organization on lack of evidence of its connection to the historical tribes it claimed. The committee's denial was based on the "petitioner's failure to meet the required five of eight criteria necessary for such recognition and their failure to establish heritage to an Indian tribe indigenous to North Carolina for at least the last 200 years."

In 1996, Occaneechi Band "filed a petition for contested case hearing with the Office of Administrative Hearings" which precipitated a year and a half of mediation. An administrative law judge recommended the NCCIA committee grant recognition to the Occaneechi Band. The NCCIA recognition committee made its Final Agency Decision against state recognition in June 1999. In August 1999, the Occaneechi Band petitioned the Orange County Superior Court, which ruled in favor of the NCCIA.

In August 2001, Judge Loretta Copeland Biggs ruled in Occaneechi Band of the Saponi Nation v. North Carolina Commission of Indian Affairs that the commission had not rendered its Final Agency Decision within the allotted time frame, so the administrative law judge's recommendation held, and the Occaneechi Band was state recognized.

== Federal recognition ==
The Occaneechi Band of Saponi Nation, represented by Lawrence Dunmore III, sent a letter of intent to petition for U.S. federal recognition as a Native American tribe in 1995, and the Eno-Occaneechi Tribe of Indians sent a letter in 1997; however, neither submitted complete petitions to the Bureau of Indian Affairs.

== Activities ==
The band purchased 24-acres of farmland, where its Homeland Preservation Project constructed a replica of Occaneechi Town, an 1880s-style farm, a 1930-style farm, a dance ground, and pavilion. They rededicated the land in April 2022. There they host their annual powwow on Dailey Store Road, ten miles (16 km) north of Mebane.

== See also ==
- Haliwa-Saponi Indian Tribe
- Sappony

== Bibliography ==
- Miller, Mark Edwin (2013). Claiming Tribal Identity: The Five Tribes and the Politics of Federal Acknowledgment. Norman: University of Oklahoma Press. ISBN 978-0806143781.
- Napier, Diane Brooke; Majhanovich, Suzanne (2013). Education, Dominance and Identity. Rotterdam, The Netherlands: Sense Publishers. pp. 32–33. ISBN 9789462091252.
- Swanton, John Reed (1952). The Indian Tribes of North America. Genealogical Publishing Com. p. 74. ISBN 9780806317304.
- Vest, Jay Hansford C. (Winter–Spring 2005). "An Odyssey among the Iroquois: A History of Tutelo Relations in New York". American Indian Quarterly. 29 (1–2): 124–55. doi:10.1353/aiq.2005.0072. JSTOR 4138803.
- Matory, James Lorand (2015). Stigma and Culture: Last-Place Anxiety in Black America. Chicago, IL: The University of Chicago Press. doi:10.7208/chicago/9780226297873.001.0001. ISBN 978-0-226-29787-3.
