= John Buck (Onondaga politician) =

Onondaga politician

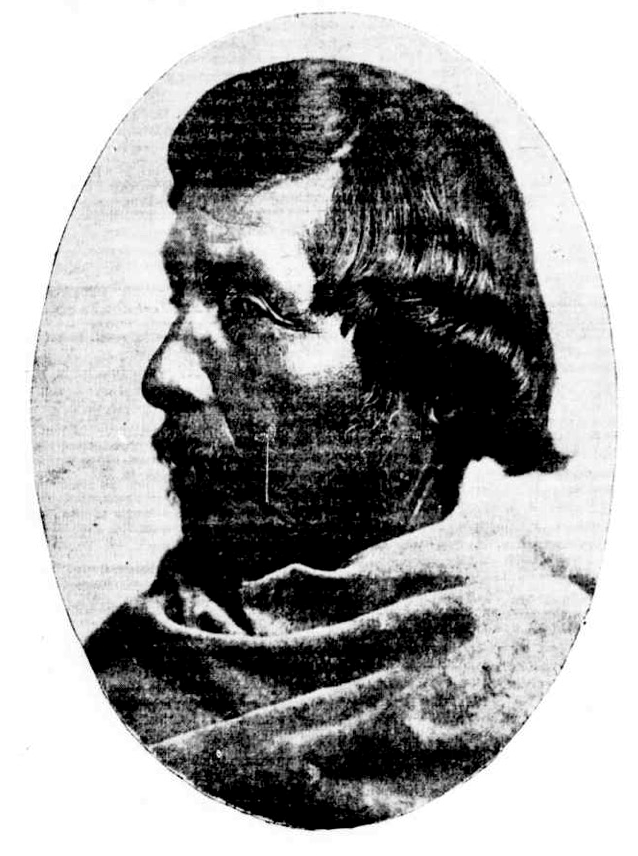
Buck in an 1897 article in the New-York Tribune.

John Buck (c. 1818 – 1893), titled Skanawati among other variants, (Note: Variant transliterations include Sha-na-wa-de and Shanawati. A contemporary source translated Ska-na-wa-ti as meaning "beyond the swamp" and said that the name had been in his family for several generations.) was a leader of the Onondaga who lived near Ontario's Grand River. He was the official keeper of the wampum records of the Haudenosaunee, sometimes described as a firekeeper. He took on the role of wampum keeper in 1843. Buck was described in a contemporary account as "a capable ruler and an able and trustworthy negotiator". Kenyon and Kenyon identify him as a "follower of Handsome Lake".

== Background ==
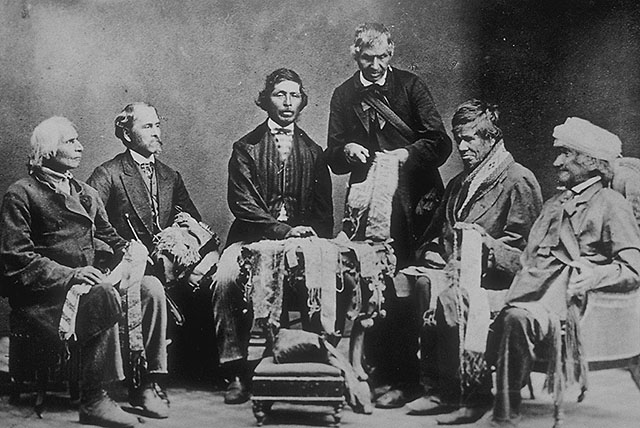
Buck (third from left), with other leaders of the Six Nations, 1871.

John Buck was born c. 1818. He was described in an obituary as being descended from "ancient Iroquois nobility" and was of Tutelo descent.

== Role as cultural keeper ==
Buck assumed the role of wampum keeper in 1843. As the official keeper of the wampum records of the Haudenosaunee, he was described as being a "conservative" leader who closely followed the traditional customs of his people. Although Buck did not speak the language, he gave lengthy interviews with English-speaking historians in an effort to preserve Haudenosaunee culture. Scholars such as J. N. B. Hewitt drew on Buck's knowledge of his people's history.

== Political advocacy ==
In June 1887, Buck and several other members of the Haudenosaunee petitioned the Canadian government to repeal portions of the Franchise Act, which had offered tribes including the Onondaga the right to vote.

== Work with anthropologists ==
He was friends with Horatio Hale. Frank Speck purchased Buck's ritual mask collection.

== Death and legacy ==
He died in 1893, aged approximately 75. (Note: Kenyon and Kenyon estimate Buck's birth as between 1823 and 1826, suggesting that he was younger than 75 in 1893.) Buck's children sold wampum belts that he had held.

== Sources ==
- Hale, Horatio, ed. (1883). The Iroquois Book of Rites. Library of Aboriginal American Literature. Vol. 2. Philadelphia: Daniel Garrison Brinton. OCLC 1048299478.
- Muller, Kathryn V. (2007). "The Two "Mystery" Belts of Grand River: A Biography of the Two Row Wampum and the Friendship Belt". American Indian Quarterly. 31 (1): 129–164. doi:10.1353/aiq.2007.0013. ISSN 0095-182X. JSTOR 4138898. S2CID 162334379.
- Obsequies of Red Jacket at Buffalo, October 9th, 1884. Transactions of the Buffalo Historical Society. Vol. 3. Buffalo: Buffalo Historical Society. 1885. OCLC 297246323.
- Rogers, Edward S.; Smith, Donald B. (1994). Aboriginal Ontario: Historical Perspectives on the First Nations. Dundurn Press. ISBN 978-1-55488-063-8. OCLC 244771106.
- Tooker, Elisabeth (1998). "A Note on the Return of Eleven Wampum Belts to the Six Nations Iroquois Confederacy on Grand River, Canada". Ethnohistory. 45 (2): 219–236. doi:10.2307/483059. JSTOR 483059.
- Welles, S. R., ed. (1892). Unveiling of the Monument Erected by the Waterloo Library and Historical Society, as a Memorial of Red Jacket. Waterloo, New York: Waterloo Library and Historical Society. OCLC 1158057471.
