= Coreorgonel =

Coordinates: 42°24.971′N 076°31.664′W

Coreorgonel was an 18th-century Native American village in what is now Tompkins County, New York. The name has been translated as "Where we keep the pipe of peace."

In the mid 18th century, a group of Tutelo, a Siouan-speaking people, migrated north from their homelands in Virginia to seek the protection of their former enemies, the Haudenosaunee (Iroquois). The Cayuga adopted the Tutelo and a related tribe, the Saponi, in 1753. The Tutelo built the village of Coreorgonel with about 25 to 30 homes, near the present-day junction of state routes 13 and 13A along the Cayuga Inlet, just south of Ithaca.

In 1779, a detachment of the Sullivan-Clinton Expedition under Colonel Henry Dearborn, tasked with wiping out Native opposition to the American Revolution, burned the village and displaced the inhabitants. Many of the survivors fled north to Canada with the Cayuga. The site is now the location of Ithaca's Tutelo Park.
