= Tutelo language =

Siouan-Catawban language in Virginia

Tutelo
- Yesá:sahį́
- Native to: United States
- Region: Virginia, West Virginia; later Pennsylvania, New York, Ontario
- Ethnicity: Tutelo
- Extinct: after 1982, with the death of Albert Green
- Revival: c.2019
- Language family: Siouan-Catawban: Siouan; Ohio Valley Siouan; Tutelo

Language codes
- ISO 639-3: tta
- Glottolog: tute1247
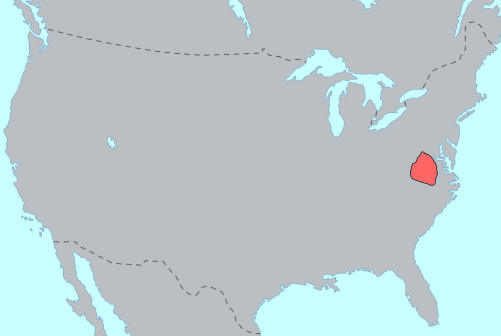
- Tutelo language region prior to European colonization.

Tutelo, also known as Tutelo–Saponi Monacan (Tutelo: Yesá:sahį́) is a member of the Ohio Valley branch of Siouan language family. Tutelo was originally spoken in what is now Virginia and West Virginia in the United States.

Most Tutelo speakers migrated north to escape warfare. They traveled through North Carolina, Pennsylvania, and New York. In 1753, the Tutelo had joined the Iroquois Confederacy under the sponsorship of the Cayuga. They finally settled in Ontario after the American Revolutionary War at what is now known as Six Nations of the Grand River First Nation.

Nikonha, the last fluent speaker in Tutelo country, died in 1871 at age 106. The year before, he had managed to impart about 100 words of vocabulary to the ethnologist Horatio Hale, who had visited him at the Six Nations Reserve.

Descendants living at Grand River Reserve in Ontario spoke Tutelo well into the 20th century. Linguists including Horatio Hale, J. N. B. Hewitt, James Owen Dorsey, Leo J. Frachtenberg, Edward Sapir, Frank Speck, and Marianne Mithun recorded the language. The last active speakers, a mother and daughter, died in a house fire shortly before Mithun's visit in 1982. The last native speaker, Albert Green, died sometime after that.

== Documentation ==
Hale published a brief grammar and vocabulary in 1883 and confirmed the language as Siouan proper through comparisons with Dakota and Hidatsa. His excitement was considerable to find an ancient Dakotan language, which was once widespread among inland tribes in Virginia, to have been preserved on a predominantly Iroquoian-speaking reserve in Ontario. Previously, the only recorded information on the language had been a short list of words and phrases collected by Lieutenant John Fontaine at Fort Christanna in 1716, and a few assorted terms recorded by colonial sources, such as John Lederer, Abraham Wood, Hugh Jones, and William Byrd II.

Hale noted the testimony of colonial historian Robert Beverley, Jr. that the dialect of the Occaneechi, believed to be related to Tutelo, was used as a lingua franca by all the tribes in the region regardless of their first languages, and it was known to the chiefs, "conjurers," and priests of all tribes. These spiritual practitioners used it in their ceremonies, just as Roman Catholic priests in Europe and the US used Latin. Hale's grammar also noted further comparisons to Latin and Ancient Greek. He remarked on the classical nature of Tutelo's rich variety of verb tenses available to the speaker, including what he remarked as an "aorist" perfect verb tense, ending in -wa.

James Dorsey, another linguist, collected extensive vocabulary and grammar samples around the same time as Hale, as did Hewitt a few years later. Frachtenberg and Sapir both visited the Six Nations Ontario reserve in the first decade of the 1900s and found that only a few Cayuga of Tutelo ancestry remembered a handful of Tutelo words. Speck did much fieldwork to record and preserve their cultural traditions in the 1930s but found little of the speech remaining. Mithun managed to collect a handful of terms that were still remembered in 1980.

The language as preserved by these efforts is now argued to have been mutually intelligible with, if not identical to, the speech of other tribes in the region with mostly unattested languages, including the Monacan and Manahoac and Nahyssan confederacies, as well as the subdivisions of Occaneechi, Saponi, etc.

In 1996, Giulia Oliverio wrote A Grammar and Dictionary of Tutelo as her dissertation. In 2021 the Living Tongues Institute for Endangered Languages received a grant to make a Living Dictionary of 'Tutelo-Saponi Monacan'.

== Phonology ==
Oliverio proposes the following analysis of the sound system of Tutelo:

=== Consonants ===
		Labial	Dental	Palatal	Velar	Glottal
Plosive/ Affricate	plain	p	t	tʃ	k	ʔ
Plosive/ Affricate	aspirated	pʰ	tʰ	tʃʰ	kʰ	
Fricative			s	ʃ	x	h
Nasal		m	n			
Lateral			l			
Approximant		w		j		

=== Vowels ===
Tutelo has a standard vowel inventory for a Siouan-Catawban language. Proto-Siouan-Catawban *ũ and *ũː is lowered to /õ/ and /õː/, respectively.

==== Oral vowels ====
	Front		Central		Back	
	short	long	short	long	short	long
High	i	iː			u	uː
Mid	e	eː			o	oː
Low			a	aː		

==== Nasal vowels ====
	Front		Central		Back	
	short	long	short	long	short	long
High	ĩ	ĩː				
Mid					õ	õː
Low			ã	ãː		

== Grammar ==
Independent personal pronouns, as recorded by Dorsey, are:

- 1st sing. - Mima (I)
- 2nd sing. - Yima (you)
- 3rd sing. - Ima (he, she, it)

The pronoun Huk "all" may be added to form the plurals Mimahuk 'we' and Yimahuk 'ye', and 'they' is Imahese.

In verbal conjugations, the subject pronouns are represented by various prefixes and suffixes, usually as follows:

- 1st sing. - Ma- or Wa- (or -ma-, -wa-)
- 2nd sing. - Ya- (-ya-)
- 3rd sing. - (null; no affixes, simple verb)
- 1st plur. - Mank- or Wa'en- (prefix only)
- 2nd plur. - Ya- (-ya-) + -pui
- 3rd plur. - --hle, -hne.

An example as given by Hale is the verb Yandosteka 'love', and the pronoun is between yando- and -steka:

- Yandowasteka, I love
- Yandoyasteka, you love
- Yandosteka, he or she loves
- Mankyandosteka, we love
- Yandoyastekapui, ye love
- Yandostekahnese, they love.

The last form includes the common additional tense suffix -se, which literally conveys the progressive tense. There are also 'stative' classes of verbs that take the 'passive' (oblique) pronoun affixes (mi- or wi-, yi- etc.) as subjects.

Additional tenses can be formed by the use of other suffixes including -ka (past), -ta (future), -wa (aorist or perfect), -kewa (past perfect), and -ma (perfect progressive). Rules for combining the suffixes with stems in final vowels are slightly complex.
