= Fort Christanna =

Archaeological site in Virginia, United States

- U.S. National Register of Historic Places
- U.S. Historic district
- Virginia Landmarks Register
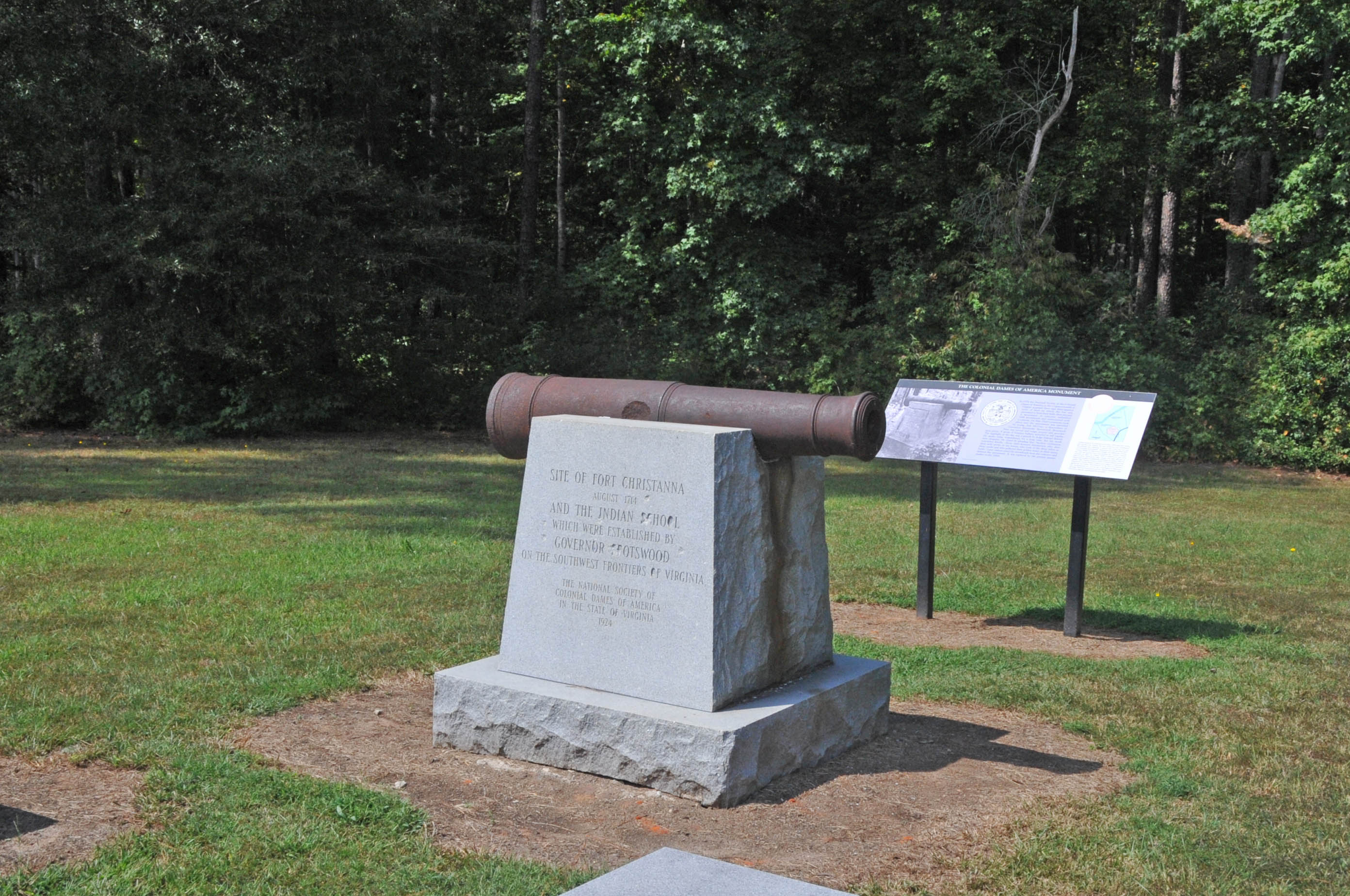

- Location within Virginia Location within the United States
- Nearest city: Lawrenceville, Virginia
- Coordinates: 36°42′57″N 77°52′07″W
- Area: 436 acres (176 ha)
- Built: 1714
- Built by: Spotswood, Alexander
- NRHP reference No.: 80004175
- VLR No.: 012-0008

Significant dates
- Added to NRHP: July 16, 1980
- Designated VLR: November 20, 1979

Fort Christanna was one of the projects of Lt. Governor Alexander Spotswood, who was governor of the Virginia Colony 1710–1722. When Fort Christanna opened in 1714, Capt. Robert Hicks was named captain of the fort and relocated his family to the area. His homestead Hicks' Ford is located near the municipality of Emporia in Greensville County, VA. The fort was designed to offer protection and schooling to the many allied tribes living to the southwest of the colonized area of Virginia. Located in what became Brunswick County, Virginia, near Gholsonville, the fort was completed in 1714 and enjoyed three successful years of operation as the westernmost outpost of the British Empire at the time, before being finally closed by the House of Burgesses in 1718. However, the many resident tribes such as the Tutelo and Saponi continued to live on the allotted land, 6 miles square (36 sq. mi), into the 1730s and 1740s. It is now a Brunswick County park, and is listed on the National Register of Historic Places.

== Background ==
After the Tuscarora War broke out in 1711, Spotswood conceived the idea of a fort where he would settle the allied tribes of Virginia that had been tributaries since 1677. The fort overlooking the Meherrin River would offer them protection from hostile tribes, act as a trading center, and also provide schooling to their children to learn English culture. In late 1713, he got his idea approved by the Burgesses; it was to be under the jurisdiction of the newly formed Virginia Indian Company, which had a monopoly.

== History ==
In 1714, Spotswood himself visited the site and successfully persuaded most of the tribes, which included the Saponi, Tutelo, Occaneechi, Nansemond and Eno, to occupy the 36 acre tract that was surveyed. However, the Iroquoian tribes in Virginia, the Nottoway and Meherrin, refused to take up their portion, saying they would not live with the others. Spotswood even contemplated abducting them to make them live at the fort, but they eluded all efforts.

He named the fort "Christ-Anna" after Christ, and after Queen Anne, who died later that year. It was built according to state-of-the-art principles of fort construction at that time, in the shape of a pentagon, and a blockhouse with 1400-lb cannon at each of the 5 corners, 100 yards apart, so as to enable each to command within sight of the next two. The Native American tribes built a town outside the fort. Spotswood's also financed a school for Indian children, and paid for a teacher, although sources differ as to whether the school was located within or outside the fort. All agree that Charles Griffin taught as many as 100 children to speak and write English, as well as to read the Bible and Book of Common Prayer. Griffin also taught some Meherrin children, but some tribal members considered them hostages.

Lieut. John Fontaine, who spent some time there 1715–1716, left a detailed account of his observations on the Indians, and also recorded about 45-50 words and phrases of their Tutelo language. He saw the fort at the peak of its success, and described hordes of "happy Indian children shrieking through the rain". Another visitor, Rev. Hugh Jones, reported that the 77 Indian students could read, write and say their catechisms tolerably well, and that the natives adored Griffin so much, they "fain would have chosen him for a King of the Sapony Nation".

Spotswood continued to take a keen interest and later started building his own house nearby, bringing his family there at one point in 1717, but ultimately settling on another tract he developed, far to the north, near Fredericksburg.

=== Decline ===
The monopoly of the Virginia Indian Company on trading soon aroused the ire of private merchants such as William Byrd II, who had inherited his father's lucrative Indian trade. While back in London, he lobbied the Lords of Trade, arguing that Christanna was an unnecessary expense, and calling on them to return to independent trade and dissolve the company. Despite Spotswood's objections, they did so on November 12, 1717. In May 1718, a treaty was signed with the Haudenosaunee in New York, whereby they agreed not to come east of the Blue Ridge, and the Burgesses thereupon voted to discontinue manning the fort. Mr Griffin remained until September, then transferred to Williamsburg, where he continued to teach Indian children at the Brafferton school of the College of William & Mary.

The Saponi and Tutelo (and the remnants of as many as 15 other tribes) remained on the tract for several more years, at a village called Junkatapurse (Tutelo: chunketa pasui, "horse's head"). Around 1728, many moved south to live with the Catawba. Others moved northward, including to Shamokin, Pennsylvania in 1740, where they became members of the Haudenosaunee Confederacy, and were formally adopted by the Cayuga nation in New York in 1753. Meanwhile, colonists had begun moving to the lands around the fort in such numbers that in 1720, Brunswick County was formed there as a separate county. The five large cannons once at the fort were supposedly buried in the well, but have not yet been located, despite the archeological excavations mentioned below. A lesser cannon said to be from Christanna was for years in the front yard of a private home nearby and fired every July 4 and Christmas. In 1900, it was moved to sit in front of the Christopher Wren Building at William and Mary. Another lesser cannon attributed to Christanna and in Lawrenceville, Virginia was fired to celebrate the election of Grover Cleveland in 1887, at which time it accidentally exploded; its remains in 1975 were said to be buried in the filled-in cellar of a former home.

== Modern era ==
In 1924, the Virginia chapter of the National Society of the Colonial Dames of America acquired about ten acres and erected a historical marker, which was dedicated at a ceremony featuring native dancers, as well as Ada McCrae (a descendant of Governor Spotswood) and local judge Edward P. Buford. The original historical marker was vandalized and replaced in 1960. A roadside marker on the other side of the Meherrin River has also been replaced.

After archeological excavations in the 1970s confirmed the site location, Brunswick County acquired another approximately 25 acres of the original fort circa 2000. Following additional archeological work and agreements with the Colonial Dames and local tourism association, the site is now a park (dedicated in 2004 and rededicated in March 2025). The bastions once constituting the fort's corners are outlined, with parking and interpretive, as well as wildlife, trails. Fort Christanna was listed on Virginia's Landmark register in 1979, and the National Register of Historic Places in 1980, as a national historic district. It is also on the Virginia Civil Rights in Education Heritage Trail.
