= Tobacco, Virginia =

Unincorporated community in Virginia, United States

Coordinates: 36°53′24″N 77°56′15″W

Tobacco is an unincorporated community located in Brunswick County, in the U.S. state of Virginia.
