= Occaneechi =

Historical Native American tribe from Virginia and North Carolina

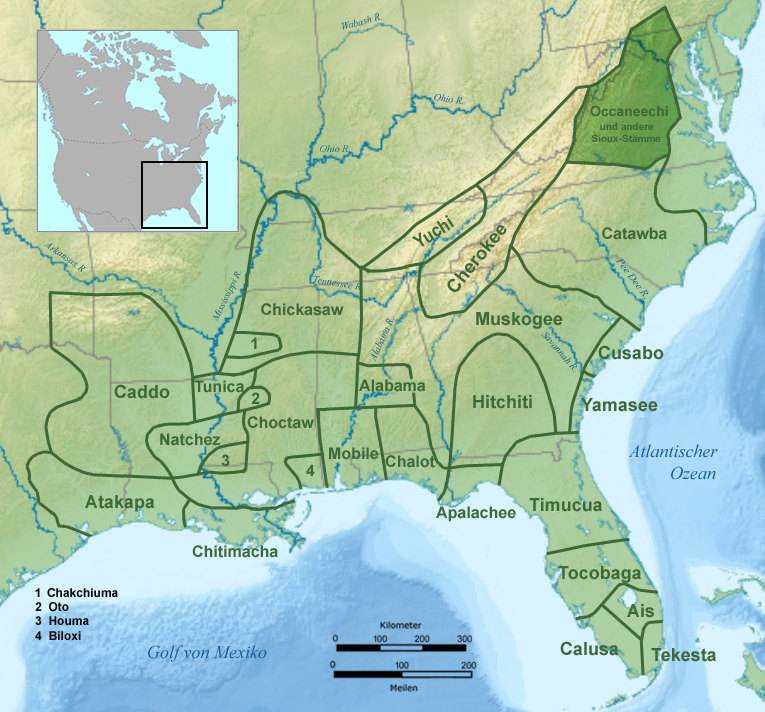
- Tribal territory of the Occaneechi during the 17th century.

Regions with significant populations
- United States (North Carolina, Virginia)

Languages
- Occaneechi language

Religion
- Indigenous religion

Related ethnic groups
- Saponi, Tutelo, Biloxi, and Ofo peoples

The Occaneechi are Indigenous peoples of the Northeastern Woodlands whose historical territory was in the Piedmont region of present-day North Carolina and Virginia.

In the 17th century, they primarily lived on the large, 4-mile (6.4 km) long Occoneechee Island and east of the confluence of the Dan and Roanoke rivers, near current-day Clarksville, Virginia. They possibly spoke a Siouan-Catawban or Algonquian language and were related to the Saponi, Tutelo, and Eno

In 1676, in the course of Bacon's Rebellion, the tribe was attacked by militias from the Colony of Virginia and decimated. Also under demographic pressure from European settlements and newly introduced infectious diseases, the Saponi and Tutelo came to live near the Occaneechi on adjacent islands. By 1714 the Occaneechi moved to join the Tutelo and Saponi people living on a 36-square-mile (93 km^{2}) reservation in current-day Brunswick County, Virginia. It included a fort called Christanna. The Natives had been drastically reduced to approximately 600 people. Fort Christanna was closed in 1717, after which there are few written references to the Occaneechi. Colonists recorded that they left the area in 1740 and migrated north for protection with the Haudenosaunee.

== Name ==
The meaning and origin of the name Occaneechi is unknown. They have also historically been called the Achonechy, Aconechos, Akenatzy, Hockinechy, Occaneches, Occaanechy, Occhonechee, Occonacheans, Occoneechee, Ockanechees, Ockanigee, Okenechee, Acconeechy, Occaneeches, Ochineeches, and Ockinagee.

== Language ==
James Mooney wrote the Occaneechi language was a Siouan-Catawban language, related to the Saponi and Tutelo languages. It became a commonly used trade language for the region by the early 18th century. Robert Beverley Jr. referred to it as "like what Lahontan calls the Algonkine", which scholar David H. Pentland wrote could either be calling it a lingua franca like Ojibwe, or classifying it as an Algonquian language. He states its linguistic affiliation cannot be defined, as it has no attestation.

== History ==
=== Precontact ===
Archeological studies have found finely chipped projectile points, which provide evidence of thousands of years of habitation, on the former Occoneechee Island, as well as nearby Field's Island, Lewis Island, and Tottero (or Nelson's) Island in the Roanoke River.

=== 17th century ===
Occaneechi Island
- Trading town
- Interactive map of Occaneechi Island
- Coordinates: 36.6151224°N 78.5331751°W
- Established: c. 1620
- Abandoned following Bacon's Rebellion: 1676
- Flooded by John H. Kerr Dam and Reservoir: c. 1953

The Occaneechi were first written about in 1650, by English explorer Edward Bland. He wrote that they lived on the Trading Path that connected Virginia with the interior of North America. Their position on the Trading Path gave the Occaneechi the power to act as trading "middlemen" between Virginia and various tribes to the west. German physician John Lederer wrote about them in 1670.

In 1673, Abraham Wood, a Virginian fur trader, sent James Needham and Gabriel Arthur into the southern Appalachian Mountains in an attempt to make direct contact with the Cherokee, thus bypassing the Occaneechi. The party did make contact with the Cherokee. It was not until the last decades of the 17th century when South Carolina colonists established a strong relationship with the Cherokee and other interior tribes, that the Occaneechi role as trading middleman was undermined.

In May 1676, the Occaneechi allied with Nathaniel Bacon and his British troops in a war with the Susquehannock; however, the British immediately turned on their allies and attacked three forts within the Occaneechi village. The British killed the Occaneechi's leader Posseclay, approximately 100 men, as well as many women and children. A Susquehannock war party attacked Occoneechee Island in the summer of 1678. Old records in the British Public Record Office describe Bacon's expedition traveling southward from the James to Roanoke Rivers, expecting the fleeing Susquehannocks would try to buy powder from the Occaneechi at their island in the Roanoke River, and entering an agreement with the Occaneechee and their Manneking, Haykolott, and Annelector allies, who raided the Susquehannocks and captured about 30 men, some of whom they put to death. The records also include a letter written by Mrs. Bacon to her sister on June 29, 1676 (which the sister received on September 26) describing many Indian raids, and Bacon's losses including an overseer at one of his outward plantations, as well as many cattle. Bacon himself also complained of losing an overseer and cattle before his expedition, and described a two-day fight at the Occaneechee island, and killing about 100 men and two of their kings, beside women and children.

By 1676, the Saponi and Tuleto settled near the Occaneechi, and eventually joined the Conestoga in Pennsylvania.

After the massacres during Bacon's Rebellion, surviving Occaneechi regrouped near a bend the Eno River at a place later to be known as the Fredricks archaeological site, east of the later American town of Hillsborough. The settlement, Occaneechi Town, was alongside a prior settlement site to be known as the Jenrette archaeological site. This site was on the Great Trading Path and the Occaneechis continued to be engaged in long-distance trade between English settlers and Indian communities.

=== 18th century ===
Occaneechi Town
- Town or village
- Interactive map of Occaneechi Town
- Coordinates: 36.0706319°N 79.0905916°W
- First settled: c. 1680
- Abandoned: 1710–1713

In 1701 John Lawson visited the Occaneechi village, located on the Eno River near present-day Hillsborough, North Carolina. His written report plus modern archaeological research at the site give insight into a society undergoing rapid change. They also were working to continue traditional crafts and a way of life.

Historian Robert Beverley, Jr., in his History and Present State of Virginia (1705), wrote that the Occaneechi language was widely used as a lingua franca, "understood by the chief men of many nations, as Latin is in many parts of Europe" — even though, he says, the Occaneechi "have been but a small nation, ever since those parts were known to the English." Beverley said that the "priests and conjurers" of the other Virginia Indian tribes "perform their adorations and conjurations" in this general language, much "as the Catholics of all nations do their Mass in the Latin." Linguistic scholars believe that the Occaneechi spoke a dialect of Tutelo.

Virginia governor Alexander Spotswood mentioned the Occaneechi as being one of nine Native nations within Virginia in 1712. Along with the "Stuckanok, Tottero, and Saponi," the Occaneechi signed a "Treaty of Peace" with the colony of Virginia in 1713. They moved to Fort Christanna in southeast Virginia. Occaneechi Town was almost entirely abandoned by 1713.

Fort Christanna was operated by the Virginia Company from 1714 to 1717. Its closure was apparently due to a lack of profits as an Indian trading center. Although several distinct groups of Indians lived at Fort Christanna, the English Virginians tended to refer to them simply as "Saponi" or "Fort Christanna Indians." After the closing of Fort Christanna in 1717, colonial records contain few references to the Occaneechi. Those references that do exist indicate a continued trade between Virginia colonists and the Saponi and Occaneechi.

By 1720, after ongoing losses from warfare, the remnant bands of the Occaneechi, Saponi, and Stukanox, "who not finding themselves Separately Numerous, enough for their Defence, have agreed to unite in one Body, and all of them now go under the Name of the Sapponeys, as William Byrd II wrote.

In 1727, a settler living near the Meherrin, in a region where some violence had broken out, wrote to the governor of Virginia about the events. He said the Meherrin denied attacking the Nottoway. "[T]hey lay the whole blame upon the Occaneechy King and the Saponi Indians." This suggests that English settlers recognized a distinction between the Occaneechi and Saponi.

In 1730 Virginia's House of Burgesses records noted an "Interpreter to the Saponi and Occaneechi Indians." This implied the existence of monoglot Occaneechi people. In 1730, many Saponi moved to live among the Catawba in South Carolina, but most returned to Virginia in 1733, along with some Cheraw Indians. After 1733 the Saponi appear to have fragmented into small groups and dispersed. Some apparently remained in the vicinity of Fort Christanna, which was noted in Virginia records by its Saponi name, Junkatapurse. After 1742 the settlement is no longer mentioned, but only a road called Junkatapurse. In the 1740s, the Saponi migrated south to live with the Catawba. Governor Gooch of Virginia reported that the "Saponies and other petty nations associated with them ... are retired out of Virginia to the Cattawbas" during the years 1743–1747.

Most of the remaining Saponi members were recorded as migrating north in 1740 for protection with the Iroquois. They mostly disappeared from the historical record in the Southeast. After the American Revolution, in which four of the Iroquois Six Nations had sided with the losing British, the majority of the Iroquois (and Saponi) went to Canada for resettlement. Descendants live mostly at the Six Nations of the Grand River First Nation reserve in Ontario. Traditional English-American histories typically describe the Saponi group of Indians as having left Virginia and North Carolina in the 18th century, either to join the Catawba or the Iroquois.

Starting in the middle of the 18th century, however, historic records note Saponi living in North Carolina. Some Saponi moved from Virginia to various places in North Carolina. There is some evidence that isolated Native Americans never left these areas of North Carolina and became consolidated with Saponi from Virginia.

In 1763, Lt. Governor Francis Fauquier of Virginia wrote a letter that included a description of the Indians of Virginia: "There are some of the Nottoways, Meherrins, Tuscaroras, and Saponys, who tho' they live in peace in the midst of us, lead in great measure the lives of wild Indians." He contrasted these Indians with the Eastern Shore and Pamunkey Indians, whom he described as more assimilated to English ways. Thus, there are still indications of Saponi in Virginia during this period.

== Archaeology ==
For years lay people and researchers have discovered thousands of artifacts from Occoneechee Town, Saponi Town, and Tutelo Town on islands in the Roanoke River near Clarksville, Virginia. Until the completion of the John H. Kerr Dam on the Roanoke River in 1952 and the islands' flooding by the resultant Kerr Lake reservoir, this site had an abundance of artifacts. Since 1983 the Research Laboratories of Anthropology at the University of North Carolina at Chapel Hill have been uncovering another "Occaneechi Town", a late 17th and early 18th century Occaneechi village on the Eno River near present-day Hillsborough, North Carolina.

== Occoneechee State Park ==
In 1968, Virginia established Occoneechee State Park on 2,698 acres on the Virginia shore of 48,000-acre Kerr Lake. Kerr Lake, created by the John H. Kerr Dam on the Roanoke River near its confluence with the Dan River, flooded Occoneechee Island where the tribe had been decimated in May 1676. A Virginia historical marker at the park's entrance mentions the massacre, as well as tribal members' return to Fort Christanna nearby decades later. The visitor center now features exhibits about the indigenous people of the area.

== North Carolina State-recognized tribe ==
In 1995, a community centered around Pleasant Grove, North Carolina, who self-identified as descendants of the Occannechi, Saponi, and Tutelo people from Fort Christanna, began hosting an annual powwow and organized under the name Occaneechi Band of Saponi. The state of North Carolina recognized the tribe in 2002, whose members primarily reside in the Alamance and Orange Counties.

== See also ==
- Native American tribes in Virginia
