= Tutelo =

Historic Indigenous tribe of the Eastern Woodlands

Yesáh
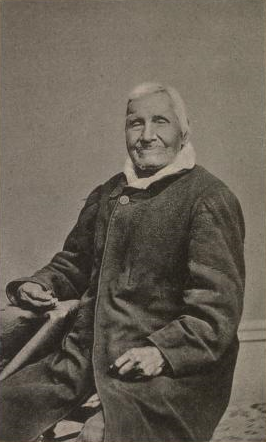
- Nikonha, a Tutelo man

Total population
- Extinct as a tribe

Regions with significant populations
- West Virginia, Virginia (until 1740s), Ontario (1779-ca. 1900) (descendants assimilated into Cayuga nation)

Languages
- Tutelo language

Related ethnic groups
- Occaneechi and Cayuga

The Tutelo (Tutelo: Yesáh) were a Native American people living above the Atlantic Seaboard Fall Line in present-day Virginia and West Virginia. They spoke the Tutelo language part of the Ohio Valley Siouan branch of the Siouan-Catawban language family.

Under pressure from English settlers and the Haudenosaunee, they joined with related nations in the late 17th century and became collectively known as the Nahyssan. By 1740, they were forced to leave their homeland and migrate north to seek protection under their former rivals. They were adopted by the Cayuga of the Haudenosaunee confederacy in 1753. Ultimately, their descendants migrated into Canada.

== Name ==
A well-attested Tutelo endonym is their word for 'people,' which is variously written as Yesáh, Yesañ, Yesáng, Yesą, Yesan, Yesah, or Yesang. This ethnonym may also be connected with the name Nahyssan, as well as earlier colonial-era ethnonyms, such as Monahassanough (John Smith). The English exonym Tutelo (also Totero, Totteroy, Tutera) possibly comes from the Algonquian variant of the name that the Haudenosaunee used for the Tutelo: Toderochrone (with many variant spellings).

== History ==
=== Precontact ===
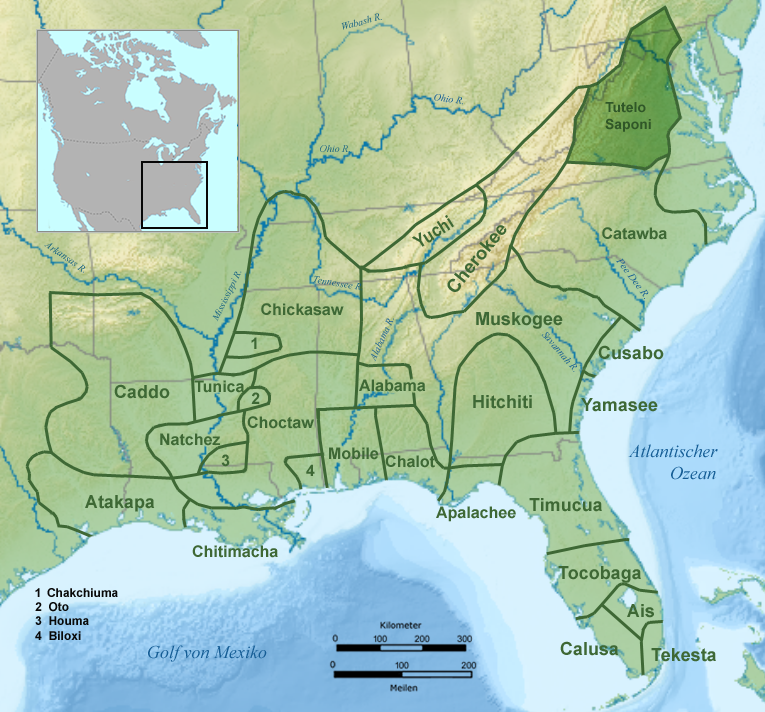
Map showing tribal lands of the Tutelo prior to 1600

Tutelo oral history states that they originated in Ohio implicitly part of the Fort Ancient culture. They likely migrated toward the coast a few centuries before European arrival. Their language shares many words with the Mosopelea language, suggesting that they were once neighboring cultures or relatives. Tutelo houses are similar to that of Monongahela culture, and their burial mounds are similar to those found in northeast Ohio and western Pennsylvania.

=== 17th century ===
The Tutelo homeland was said to include the area of the Big Sandy River on the West Virginia–Kentucky border, which they called the "Totteroy River." The Haudenosaunee conquered the region and dispersed the Tutelo during the later Beaver Wars (c. 1670), after which the Haudenosaunee established the Ohio Valley as their hunting ground. Charles Hanna believed their name, first appearing as Oniasont on 17th-century French maps, to be a variation of the names recorded in West Virginia and western Virginia at the same time period, as Nahyssan, Tutelo and Monahassanough.

Although previously known to the Virginia colonists by their other names, a form of Tutelo first appeared in Virginia records in 1671, when the Batts and Fallam expedition noted their visit to "Totero Town" near what is now Salem, Virginia. A few years later, the Tutelo joined the Saponi to live on islands located where the Dan and Staunton rivers join to become the Roanoke River. It was just above the territory of the Occaneechi. For a time, the Tutelo had a settlement on the banks of the New River. Many of the sherds collected there and the small triangular points, suggest a mid- to late 16th-century or an early 17th-century date.

Between 1671 and 1701, Tutelo were forced to abandoned their homelands and join the Occaneechi.

=== 18th century ===
In 1701, they were noted as living at the headwaters of the Yadkin River in North Carolina. After 1714, the Saponi and Tutelo, collectively known as a Nahyssan, resided at Junkatapurse around Fort Christanna in Brunswick County, Virginia, near the border with North Carolina.

After the signing of the 1722 Treaty of Albany, the Haudenosaunee ceased their attacks upon the Tutelo. In the 1730s, Tutelo people moved north to Shamokin, Pennsylvania, and sought the protection of the Oneida viceroy, Shickellamy (who had a Tutelo wife). After 1753, the Cayuga formally agreed to adopt the Tutelo, who were then moved to the south side of Cayuga Lake and eastern Cayuga Inlet, near present-day Ithaca, New York.

The Tutelo village of Coreorgonel was located near present-day Ithaca, New York and Buttermilk Falls State Park. There they lived under the protection of the Cayuga until Coreorgonel, along with many other towns, was destroyed during the American Revolutionary War by the Sullivan Expedition of 1779.

The Tutelo went with their new relatives to Canada, where the British offered land for resettlement at what became known as the Six Nations of the Grand River First Nation. In 1785, 75 Tutelos lived among 1,200 residents on the Six Nations reserve. They continued to live among the Cayuga and could no longer maintain their culture due to low populations and intermarriage. The last known native Tutelo speaker, Nikonha or Waskiteng ("Old Mosquito") died in 1870 at the age of 105. He had given extensive linguistic material to the scholar Horatio Hale, who confirmed the Tutelo language as a Siouan language. His father's name was Onusowa, a Tutelo leader who established a village in New York state. Their village was attacked during the Sullivan Expedition, an American operation to destroy the pro-British elements of the Six Nations in New York.

=== 19th century ===
John Key, also known as Gostango (meaning "Below the Rock") and Nastabon ("One Step") survived Nikonha as the last recorded fluent speaker of the Tutelo language. He died on March 23, 1898, at 78 years old. Chief John Buck (Onondaga/Tutelo, ca. 1818–1893) was a Haudenosaunee firekeeper at the Oshweken Longhouse on the Six Nations Reserve in Ontario. He recounted Tutelo stories to American ethnologists John Napoleon Brinton Hewitt and Frank Speck.

== Crops ==
Aside from growing and gathering many native plants from their traditional territory, the Tutelo people have been linked to Tutelo Strawberry Corn and may have grown predecessor varieties of Boston Mallow Squash and Oronoco Tobacco. Boston Mallow was developed by horticulturalists in Boston, MA in the 19th century from seed said to have been traceable back to a group of Natives in the vicinity of Buffalo, NY around the end of the Revolutionary War. Some documents suggest that the Haudenosaunee had sent a group of people there to reestablish towns and farms ravaged by the Sullivan Expedition. They were led by the then leader of the Tutelo and may have therefore been mostly Tutelo.

Corn would have been a fairly recent arrival to their home region at the time of contact and they probably did not live in Virginia with it, as they may have with other seed varieties. This shows in their word for corn- mandahe- seemingly being an amalgamation of the Algonquian word Mandamin and the Iroquoian word nehe.

== See also ==
- Catawba
- Cheraw
- Cherokee
- Cusabo
- Great Law of Peace
- Massawomeck
- Muscogee
- Shawnee
- Susquehannock
- Powhatan
- Piscataway people
- Sewee
- Yuchi
