= Great Treaty of 1722 =

Treaty between the Haudenosaunee and British colonies

The Great Treaty of 1722 was a document signed in Albany, New York, by leaders of the Five Nations of the Haudenosaunee, Province of New York, Colony of Virginia, and Province of Pennsylvania. Also known as the Treaty of Albany, it was made to create a boundary and keep the peace between English settlers and the Haudenosaunee nations. The Governor of Virginia, Alexander Spotswood used this treaty as a way to bring more settlers to North America and expand the British Empire.

== Details ==
Following the Beaver Wars of the 17th century, the Haudenosaunee confederacy had amassed a great deal of influence in North America. The British colonies in North America were still relatively small, but growing in influence- especially following the 1664 acquisition of New Amsterdam. The Haudenosaunee re-iterated their dominance over other Native Nations, specifically naming the Tuscaroras, Conestoga, and Shawnee. They agreed to use their influence to protect the British colonies from attacks from Native Americans.

The negotiations included a grievance reconciliation process, which promoted restorative justice rather than the death penalty. It was based on the February 1722 murder of Sawantaeny, a Seneca hunter, by brothers John and Edmund Cartlidge. One of the two brothers had struck Sawantaeny in the head when he refused to accept rum as payment for furs.

The principal negotiator for the British colonies was William Burnet. A principal spokesman for the Haudenosaunee was a man referred to as "Captain Civility," a Susquehannock man who spoke multiple native languages.

== Sources ==
- "Conference between Governor Burnet and the Indians". Early Recognized Treaties with American Indian Nations.
- Wulf, Karin (28 April 2021). "A 1722 Murder Spurred Native Americans' Pleas for Justice in Early America". Smithsonian Magazine.
- Jennings, Francis (1984). The Ambiguous Iroquois Empire. The Covenant Chain Confederation of Indian Tribes with English Colonies from Its Beginnings to the Lancaster Treaty of 1744. Manhattan: W.W. Norton & Company. ISBN 0393303020.
- Eustace, Nicole (29 April 2021). "One of the Most Important American Documents You've Never Heard Of. Colonial Lessons in Civility from the Five Nations of the Haudenosaunee". Literary Hub.
- "Excerpts from the Treaty of Albany (1722)". World History Commons.
