= Horatio Hale =

American anthropologist (1817–1896)

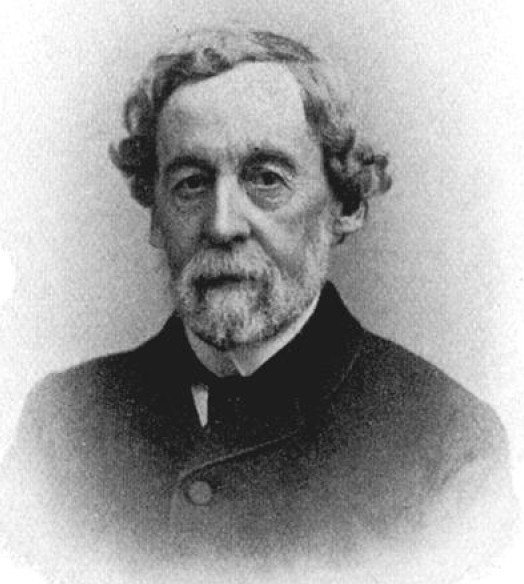
- Born: Horatio Emmons Hale; May 3, 1817; Newport, New Hampshire, U.S.
- Died: December 28, 1896 (aged 79); Clinton, Ontario, Canada
- Education: Harvard University
- Mother: Sarah Josepha Hale
- Scientific career
- Fields: ethnology

Horatio Emmons Hale (May 3, 1817 – December 28, 1896) was an American-Canadian ethnologist, philologist and businessman. He is known for his study of languages as a key for classifying ancient peoples and being able to trace their migrations.

Hale was the first to analyze and confirm that the Tutelo language of some Virginia Native Americans belonged to the Siouan family, which was most associated with the western Dakota and Hidatsa languages.

Hale also determined that the Cherokee language spoken by a tribe associated with the Appalachian Mountains and upland areas of the interior American Southeast was one of the Iroquoian family of languages. Most of the speakers of the latter had historically occupied territory to the east and south of the Great Lakes, in present-day New York and Pennsylvania. In addition, he published a work, Iroquois Book of Rites (1883), based on his translation of their only two known historic manuscripts. It was supported by his studies with tribal elders in interpreting the Iroquois wampum belts to establish the people's prehistory.

== Early life and education ==
Horatio Hale was born on May 3, 1817, at Newport, New Hampshire, in the United States, the son of Sarah Josepha Hale (née Buell), a writer and prominent magazine editor, and David Hale, a lawyer who died when Hale was five.

Entering Harvard College in 1833, Hale showed a marked faculty for languages. His first original work was published the next year, and attracted the attention of the college authorities. It consisted of an Algonkian vocabulary, which he gathered from a band of Native Americans who had camped on the college grounds. While at Harvard, he was a founding member of the A.D. Club, then known as an honorary chapter of Alpha Delta Phi fraternity.

== United States Exploring Expedition ==
Three years later, when the United States Exploring Expedition was organized under Charles Wilkes, Hale was recommended, while yet an undergraduate, for the post of ethnologist and philologist. He was appointed to the position.

From 1838 to 1842, Hale worked with the expedition, visiting South America, Australasia, Polynesia, and north-western America, then known as Oregon Country. From this point he returned overland. The Hale Passages of Puget Sound were named in recognition of his service to the expedition.

The expedition also traveled to Polynesia. Of the reports of that expedition, Hale prepared the sixth volume, Ethnography and Philology (1846), which is said to have laid the foundations of the ethnography of Polynesia.

== Personal life ==
Having completed his master's degree at Harvard, Hale made a short tour of Europe. On his return, he studied law, and was admitted to the Chicago bar in 1855. In 1854, at Jersey City, New Jersey, he married Margaret Pugh, whom he met in Ontario. Her father William was formerly justice of the peace for the township of Goderich in Huron County, Canada West (now Ontario).

In 1856, the Hales moved to Clinton, Ontario, Canada, where he administered the estate of his father-in-law. He began to get involved in local real estate development and other business and educational endeavours.

He continued to reside in Clinton until his death, devoting much attention to the development of the Ontario school system. He was influential in introducing co-education of the sexes in high schools and collegiate institutes, in increasing the grants to these institutions, in establishing the normal school system for training of teachers, and in improving the methods of examination.

== Native American studies ==
In Canada Hale returned to his study of First Nations and Native Americans. He was mentored by the Iroquois chiefs George Henry Martin Johnson and John Fraser, whom he met while visiting the Six Nations of the Grand River First Nation in Ontario. In addition he traveled to the United States to consult with other native informants. Hale documented the oral history and rituals of the Iroquois Confederacy. He was assisted in interpreting the group's wampum belts, which recounted their history. As a result of this work, he published The Iroquois Book of Rites (1883). He also studied the Iroquois languages, determining that Mohawk was the oldest. He also concluded that the Laurentian languages were Iroquoian.

Archeologists and linguists have since confirmed that the St. Lawrence Iroquoians were an early people who had occupied territory in what is now considered upper New England and along the St. Lawrence River in Quebec and Ontario from about the 14th century to about 1580. They were likely destroyed by the Mohawk from central New York, who were competing for control of hunting grounds and the fur trade.

Hale made many valuable contributions to the science of ethnology, attracting attention particularly by his theory of the origin of the diversities of human languages and dialects. This was inspired by his study of child languages, or the languages invented by young children. He also emphasized the importance of languages as tests of mental capacity, and demonstrated that Native American languages were complex and had a high capacity for classification.

He used language as a criterion for the classification of human groups. He was the first to discover that the Tutelo language of Virginia belonged to the Siouan family, which was more commonly associated with the Dakota and Hidatsa languages and tribes located to the west of the Great Lakes and Mississippi River.

He was also the first to identify the Cherokee language as a member of the Iroquoian family of languages. By the colonial and federal period, the Cherokee people were primarily located in the southern interior of present-day Tennessee, North Carolina, Georgia and Alabama. Most of their members were among the southeastern tribes forced to relocate during the Indian removal of the 1830s to territory west of the Mississippi River, in what was reserved for a time as Indian Territory (now the state of Oklahoma).

== Honours ==
Hale never received a doctorate but his research was recognized through his roles in a number of academic societies.

In 1872, Hale was elected as a member of the American Philosophical Society.

In 1884, he reorganized the section of anthropology as an independent department of the British Association for the Advancement of Science, at its meeting in Montreal that year. He had already performed a like service for the American Association. At the request of the British committee, he undertook the supervision of the anthropological section's work in the Canadian North-west and British Columbia. The reports, which are very elaborate, were published in the Association's Proceedings from 1885 to 1897. While Hale continued as a member of the committee, he was asked to accept the position of vice-president at the Association's meeting in Toronto (1896); he declined due to ill-health.

Hale was also a member of the American Folklore Society, serving as its president in 1893.

Hale was an honorary fellow of the Anthropological Institute of Great Britain, to which he contributed a number of papers.

== Death ==
Hale died on December 29, 1896, in Clinton, Ontario. In an appreciation of his life, Franz Boas wrote: "Ethnology has lost a man who contributed more to the knowledge of human race than perhaps any student".

== Selected publications ==
- Hale, Horatio (1846). Ethnography and philology. Philadelphia, Pa.: Lea and Blanchard. OCLC 222779990.
- Hale, Horatio (1881). Hiawatha and the Iroquois confederation: a study in anthropology. OCLC 1957917.
- Hale, Horatio (1883). "The Tutelo Tribe and Language". Proceedings of the American Philosophical Society. 21 (114): 1–47. ISSN 0003-049X.
- Hale, Horatio (1883). Indian migrations, as evidenced by language: comprising the Huron-Cherokee stock, the Dakota stock, the Algonkins, the Chahta-Muskoki stock, the Moundbuilders, the Iberians. Chicago: Jameson & Morse. OCLC 14635656.
- Hale, Horatio (1886). The origin of languages, and the antiquity of speaking man. An address before the Section of anthropology of the American association for the advancement of science, at Buffalo, August, 1886. Cambridge: John Wilson and Son. OCLC 12601731.
- Hale, Horatio (1888). The development of language. A paper read before the Canadian Institute, Toronto, April, 1888. Toronto: The Copp, Clark Company, Limited. OCLC 32636576.
- Hale, Horatio (1891). Language as a test of mental capacity: being an attempt to demonstrate the true basis of anthropology. OCLC 1048996952.
- Hale, H (1892), "The Klamath Nation: I.--The Country and the People.", Science, 19 (465) (published January 1, 1892): 6–7, doi:10.1126/science.ns-19.465.6, PMID 17813801
- Hale, H (1892), "The Klamath Nation: II.--Linguistics", Science, vol. 19, no. 466 (published January 8, 1892), pp. 20–21, doi:10.1126/science.ns-19.466.20, PMID 17774144
- Hale, H (1892), "The Klamath Nation: III.--Mythology and General Ethnology", Science, vol. 19, no. 467 (published January 15, 1892), pp. 29–31, Bibcode:1892Sci....19...29H, doi:10.1126/science.ns-19.467.29, PMID 17731636
- Hale, H (1895), "An International Scientific Catalogue and Congress", Science, 1 (12) (published March 22, 1895): 324–326, Bibcode:1895Sci.....1..324H, doi:10.1126/science.1.12.324, PMID 17829255
