= John Lederer =

German explorer

John Lederer was a 17th-century German physician and an explorer of the Appalachian Mountains. He and the members of his party became the first Europeans to crest the Blue Ridge Mountains (1669) and the first to see the Shenandoah Valley and the Allegheny Mountains beyond. A map documenting his discoveries was integral to subsequent understanding of the interior.

== Biography ==
Johann Lederer was born in Hamburg, Holy Roman Empire, in 1644. He studied medicine at the Hamburg Academic Gymnasium where he matriculated in 1662. Lederer immigrated to Virginia in 1668. By this time he spoke French, Italian and Latin in addition to German, but had to learn English.

Believing that the riches of California lay just beyond the mountains west of Virginia, Sir William Berkeley, colonial governor of Virginia, commissioned Lederer to make three expeditions into the Appalachians between 1669 and 1670. Berkeley wanted him to find a passage to the West and the Indian Ocean, which Europeans believed was a few weeks' travel away.

On 9 March 1669, Lederer left Chickahominy, an Indian village near the headwaters of the York River, and traveled northwest to Eminent Hill. During this expedition, lasting until 24 March, he and the three members of his small party became the first Europeans to crest the Blue Ridge Mountains, and the first to see the Shenandoah Valley and the Allegheny Mountains beyond.

In May 1670 Lederer left Fort Charles (now Richmond) and followed the eastern slope of the Blue Ridge Mountains south into what is now North Carolina. He was accompanied by Major Harris, commanding twenty white men, and five Indian guides. Twenty-one members of the party turned back, but Lederer pushed on with Jackzetavon, one of his five Iroquoian-speaking Susquehannock guides. They explored North Carolina to the Catawba River near what is now Charlotte. They returned to Virginia by mid-July, when they reached Fort Henry (now Petersburg), a frontier post on the Appomattox River.

On 20 August of that year Lederer and Col. John Catlett set out on the third expedition. They departed from Robert Talifer's (surname may have been Taliaferro or a variation of this prominent family) house, at a small settlement south of the Rappahannock River. They followed the Rappahannock River valley north, where Lederer noted "vast herds of red and fallow deer which stood gazing at us". Unable to cross the Blue Ridge by horseback, they left their mounts with some Indians in the party and climbed the mountains by foot. From the heights, they sighted the Allegheny Mountains beyond the Shenandoah Valley.

== The Discoveries of John Lederer ==
John Lederer settled in Maryland in 1671. In 1672 his expedition reports (a total of only 35 pages) were translated from Latin by Sir William Talbot, the governor of Maryland. Together with a map of his expeditions, this material was published as The Discoveries of John Lederer, In three several Marches from Virginia, To the West of Carolina, And other parts of the Continent: Begun in March 1669, and ended in September 1670. Before Lederer, accounts and maps of the interior had been vague. While some corrections have been made, Lederer's map was important for subsequent explorers and settlement. In addition, he identified many Native American tribes and villages.

Lederer recorded several legends and customs he observed among the "Monakin" (Monacan) who occupied the Piedmont area of Virginia. Other Native groups which he described visiting on his second journey included the Nahyssans at Sapon and Akenatzy; the Rickahockans; the Oenocks (Weyanokes); the Shackorys at Watary and Shakor; the town of Sara in the mountains that "receive from the Spaniards the name of Suala" (now known as Joara); the Usheryes at Wisacky and Ushery; the Toskiroros at Katearas; and the Indian towns of Kawitziokan, Menchaerinck (Meherrin), Natoway, and Apamatuck.

== Sources ==
- Cumming, William P., ed. (1958), The Discoveries of John Lederer, with Unpublished Letters by and About Lederer to Governor John Winthrop, Jr., and an Essay on the Indians of Lederer's Discoveries by Douglas L. Rights and William P. Cumming. Edited with Notes by William P. Cumming., Charlottesville, Va.: University of Virginia Press (Lederer's account originally translated from Latin and published in London in 1672 by Sir William Talbot)
- Cunz, Dieter (1942) John Lederer: Significance and Evaluation (William and Mary Quarterly. Apr. 1942)

== Related Reading ==
- Carrier, Lyman (1939) The Veracity of John Lederer, (William and Mary Quarterly, Series II, Vol. 19, No. 4, pp. 435–445)
- Drake, Richard B. (2001), A History of Appalachia, (Lexington, Ky.: University Press of Kentucky)
- Waldman, Carl; Wexler, Alan (1992), Who Was Who in World Exploration, (New York: Facts on File, Inc.)
