= Big moon peyotism =

Variant of the Peyote religion

Big Moon Peyotism
- Type: Syncretic
- Classification: Native American
- Founder: John Wilson
- Origin: 1890
- Branched from: Native American Church

Big moon peyotism was introduced as a variant of the Peyote religion in the 1880s that incorporated Christian, Caddo, and Delaware Indian religious symbols with the consumption of peyote intertwined from Caddo and Delaware rituals. The plant itself, peyote, had been used for spiritual practice by the Mescalero Apache in the 1880, and their use of it influenced other tribes like the Comanche and Kiowa. Peyotism inquires all of the same traits found in other religions such as a doctrine, a ritual, and ethics. The doctrine includes the belief of the actuality of power, incarnation, and spirits. It soon spread all over the Indian Territory while its native people were searching for spiritual help. Peyotism at this point, was a spiritual path that was soon to be taken in Indian Territory. Around 1890, the Caddo, Delaware/ Lenape and Quapaw tribes became the first practitioners of peyote. Black Wolf, a practitioner from the Caddo tribe, brought the religion of little moon peyotism to the Osage people. Black Wolf had intrigued enough of the tribe that his peyote prayers and rituals had truth and value, so the people sent him to heal a sick person in their tribe. His prayers and rituals could not save their life, so peyotism was not being spread for a while. After the native people's dry spell towards peyotism, it returned to the Osage tribe around 1898.

John Wilson, a Caddo- Delaware, also known as Moonhead, is credited with the birth of this religion around the year 1890. He was asked to build a Peyote altar to conduct Big Moon rituals for Tall Chief, the Quapaw chief. While Wilson was visiting Osage territory, an Osage man who had attended a Peyote meeting beforehand, had asked Wilson to share his new revelations about big moon peyotism and its rules with a group of Osage people. Wilson agreed and met with them. This religion was adopted by Wichita, Delaware, Quapaw, Shawnee, Oklahoma Seneca-Cayuga, but no tribe converted the Osage. The Osage and Quapaw are the only current practitioners in the religion to this day. The Chief of the Osage people, Black Dog, was left without a tribe because his was won over by the big moon peyotism worshippers.

In the two weeks that John Wilson experimented with peyote for religious and spiritual reasons, he was repeatedly submerged in spirit into the sky, being shown essential figures in the sky that symbolized the events of Christ, along with positions of the Spiritual forces such as the moon, sun and fire and their relative positions. He was also shown the empty grave of Christ while in this estate. He states that peyote told him to forever take its "road" by continually consuming peyote, to reach a higher enlightenment.

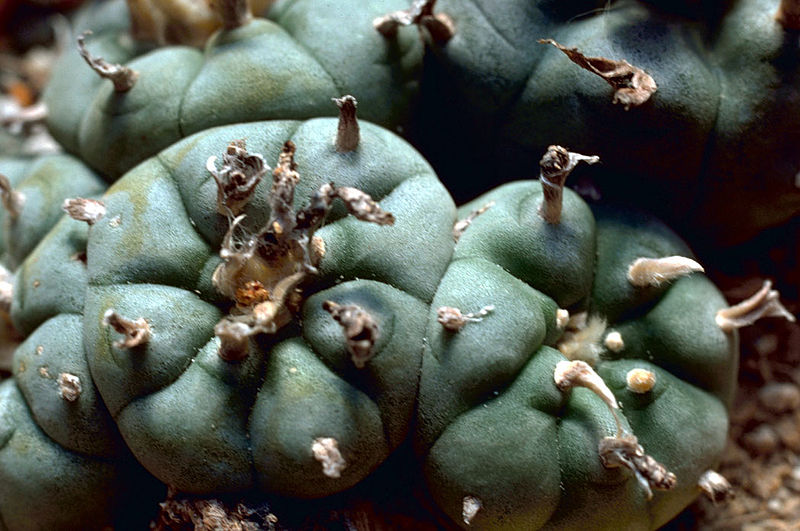
The plant that is used for religious rituals in big moon peyotism.

== Osage tribe ==
The Osage were the most significant converts to this religion. John Wilson was responsible for the Osage people becoming such believers and followers. Wilson was traveling to Anadarko, Oklahoma, Osage Nation). While traveling he visited with Tall Chief, who was the chief of the Quapaw tribe. Wilson was later convinced to bring the knowledge of his new religion to these people. After explaining his realization about how the mixed elements of Christian, Caddo, and Delaware religious symbols and linking the consumption of peyote with Caddo and Delaware rituals, was the efficient way to heaven. With the mass conversion of the Osage, a proper church for big moon peyotism was constructed. Osage Peyote Church was founded in 1889, on property that would later become part of the John Zink Ranch.

== Big Moon Ceremony ==
Previous to the ceremony, multiple ritual preparations are performed. At dawn the Roadmen, or the ceremony conductors, gather to collect their instruments and to perform some ceremonial prayers and singing. Then before noon, the peyote and ritual instruments are taken are taken to the church, where the sacred fire is lit by flint and steel, and the objects that hold ritual use are arranged on the cloth of the altar. After the rituals have taken place, the tribe members will rest for a meal at noon. The fire stays maintained for the whole afternoon. This is a prerequisite to the actual service.

Traditionally, the service begins at dark. The attendees enter the church and their assigned seatings while a prayer is being shared by one of the roadmen, following with a statement of the purpose of the meeting. The only person who is allowed to speak and smoke at this time are the roadmen. After this, the passing of sage and peyote is arranged, and the meeting officially begins when the roadmen sing four different Starting Songs. After this, the Drum Chief is the next one to sing, who follows in a full round of drumming for each person. Next, the roadmen and the drum chief stand in the center of the altar while being given words of respect and love while being fanned. The fire plays a significant role in the ceremony, for it gets maintained throughout the ceremony by the Firemen.

Towards the end, there comes time for some reflection and for anyone with any needs to come forward and ask for something. The Tobacco boss rolls another ceremonial cigarette, while a roadman offers a prayer to his participants. Water is offered to anyone who is thirsty after their spiritual experience. This ritual presumes in singing, with incorporated fanning of the fireman in need. The ceremony continues to stay like this until morning, where a ceremony called "greeting the sun" is taken place if it is a clear morning.

When the ceremony is beginning to wrap up, each participant holds the ritual instruments, blessing themselves with it. After this, the attendees gather again for rounds of ceremonial singing until it hits noon. The attendees understand that when the fireman begins to sing the Dinner Songs, it is now time for them to wash up for a ceremonial dinner. After washing up and cleansing in cedar smoke, the guests re-enter the church and meet with family and guests that did not attend the ceremony.
