= Lakota Puberty Ball Ceremony =

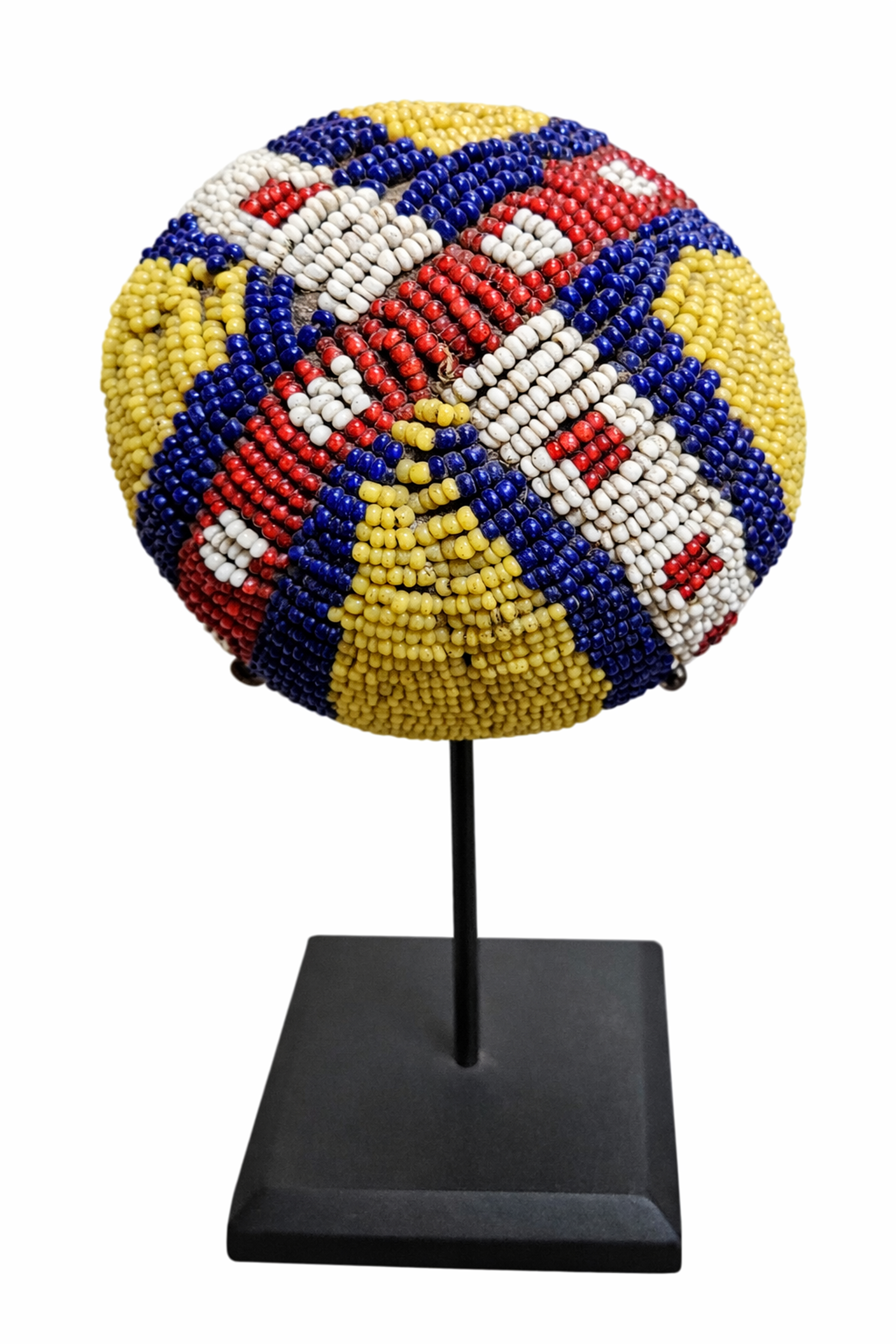
- Lakota Puberty Ball Lakota ca 1880s
- Native name: Isnáthi Awíčhalowaŋpi
- Type: Coming-of-age ritual

The Lakota Puberty Ball Ceremony (Lakota: Isnáthi Awíčhalowaŋpi) is the traditional coming-of-age ritual for girls among the Lakota people of the Northern Plains. The ceremony marks the transition from childhood to womanhood and emphasizes endurance, kinship responsibility, spiritual discipline, and communal continuity. The puberty ball, typically made of beaded buffalo or deer hide, functions as both a symbolic and instructional object within this rite.

== Materials and construction ==
The puberty ball was traditionally fashioned from materials available within Lakota homelands, including tanned buffalo or deer hide, sinew stitching, and decorative glass beadwork or earlier porcupine quillwork. Stuffing might consist of buffalo hair, plant fiber, or cloth. Its spherical form symbolized wholeness and continuity, reflecting the cyclical nature of life and the sacred circle central to Plains cosmology.

== Women as Cultural Bearers ==
Ceremonial objects used in Isnáthi Awíčhalowaŋpi were traditionally made by Lakota women—often mothers, grandmothers, or respected female elders. The process of constructing the ball served as an intergenerational teaching practice through which cultural knowledge, moral instruction, and kinship obligations were transmitted.

Lakota women developed highly refined artistic traditions. Prior to the widespread introduction of glass trade beads in the nineteenth century, artisans practiced intricate porcupine quillwork; beadwork later became a central artistic medium. Decorative motifs—such as geometric patterns and star forms—carried cosmological and directional meanings and were not purely ornamental. Through the creation of ceremonial items, women preserved cultural memory and reinforced their roles within both domestic and sacred spheres.

== Sacred womanhood in Lakota cosmology ==
Within Lakota religious tradition, women are associated with life-giving power and moral authority. The figure of White Buffalo Calf Woman, a foundational sacred being in Lakota belief, symbolizes the spiritual origins of ceremonial life and affirms the sanctity of womanhood.

Menarche was traditionally understood as the awakening of creative and generative power. Rather than being stigmatized, this transition required ritual guidance and communal acknowledgment because of its spiritual potency.

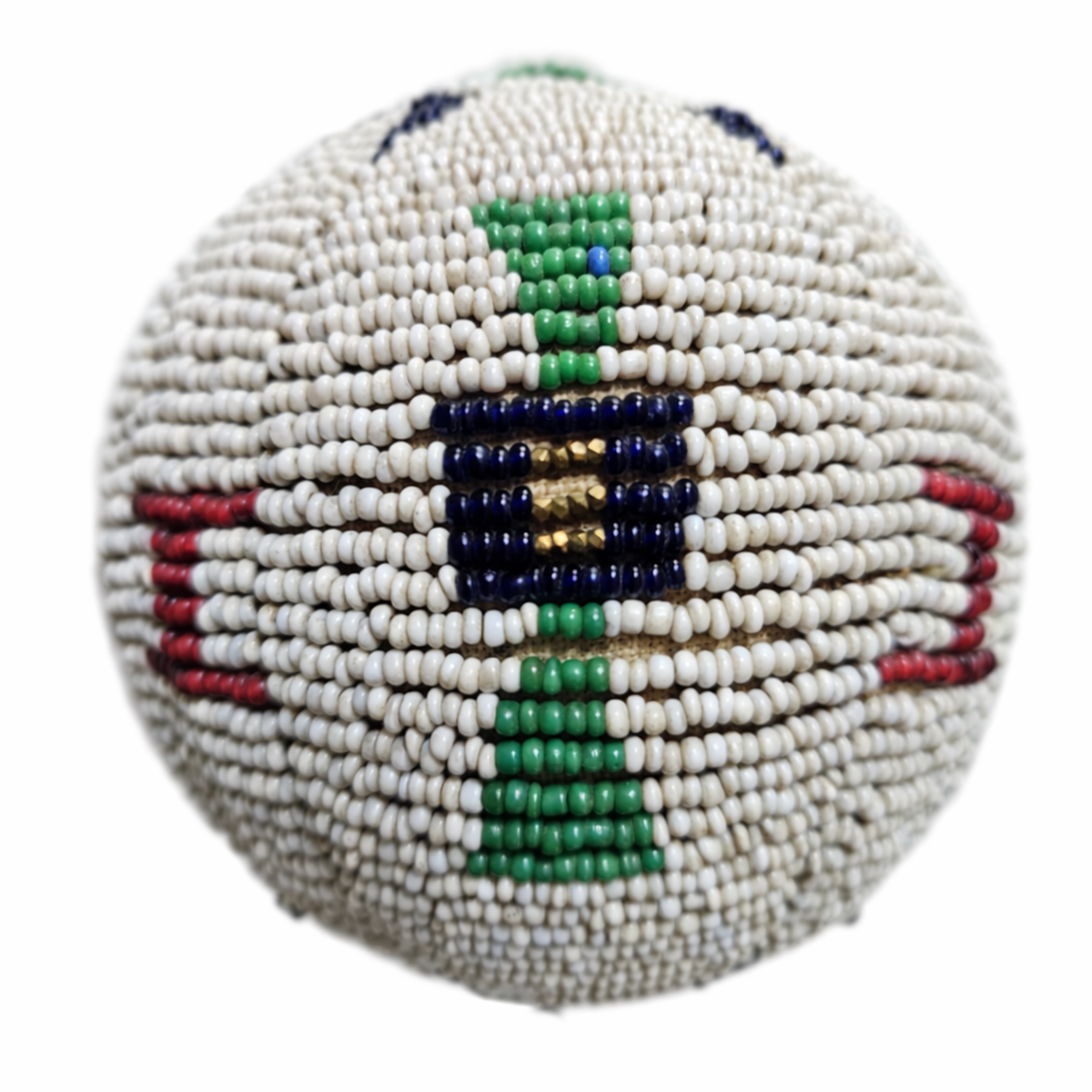
Lakota Puberty Ball Lakota ca 1890s side view

== The Ceremony ==
Ethnographic accounts describe that when a girl experienced her first menstruation, she entered a structured ceremonial period under the supervision of elder women. Seclusion marked a liminal phase between childhood and adulthood and provided instruction in domestic production, generosity, kinship responsibilities, and ethical conduct.

Accounts of Isnáthi Awíčhalowaŋpi also describe practices such as dawn running, intended to cultivate endurance and discipline—qualities associated with adult responsibility. The community later gathered for feasting and gift exchange, affirming that womanhood carried collective significance. The puberty ball, used in ceremonial contexts and symbolic play, functioned as a tangible reminder of resilience and communal bonds.

== Social significance ==
In traditional Lakota society, women exercised substantial economic and social authority. They owned and maintained the tipi, controlled household property, and played central roles in family continuity. By ritually marking puberty, Lakota communities recognized that a girl's maturation strengthened the entire camp circle and reinforced social stability and gender complementarity.

== Suppression and revitalization ==
During the late 19th and early 20th centuries, United States federal assimilation policies and the Indian boarding school system sought to suppress Indigenous ceremonial practices, including puberty rites. Despite these pressures, teachings associated with Isnáthi Awíčhalowaŋpi persisted through oral transmission and family practice.

Contemporary Lakota cultural revitalization movements have renewed interest in traditional ceremonies as part of broader efforts toward sovereignty, healing, and spiritual continuity. The puberty ball remains a symbol of women's artistry, spiritual authority, and intergenerational resilience.
