= Betty Gaedtke =

Quapaw pottery and culture keeper from Arkansas, U.S.

- Te-Mi-Zhi-Ka
- Citizenship: Quapaw Nation and American
- Style: Mississippian revival pottery
- Movement: Quapaw pottery
- Spouse: Steven Gaedtke
- Website: quapawpots.com

Betty Gaedtke (Quapaw Nation) is a Quapaw elder and potter, based in Arkansas. She previously served on the Quapaw Business Committee. Gaedtke's achievements have resulted in her being honored as an AARP recipient.

== Background ==
Betty Gaedtke is a member of the Buffalo clan. Her Quapaw name is Te-Mi-Zhi-Ka, which translates to "little buffalo woman". Her grandmother, who died in 1987, was full-blood Quapaw, and her mother died in 2019.

She married Steven Gaedtke and lives in Yellville, Arkansas.

== Art career ==
Ceramics of Indigenous peoples of the Americas, also known as Native American pottery, is one of the significant art forms of the Quapaw people ancestrally, however it went through a period of dormancy. Gaedtke has been a driving force in the revitalization of the Quapaw pottery tradition. This has included significant study of ancestral pottery, time invested into learning pottery techniques, and dozens of Quapaw community classes aimed at the revival of traditional forms, as well as many lectures and classes for other communities.

She lecture about, teaches, and demonstrates pottery-making. She has exhibited at the Arkansas Pottery Festival.

== Collections ==
Gaedtke's pottery is featured in many locations including Crystal Bridges Museum of American Art, the Carnegie Museum of Natural History, Downstream Casino Resort, Angel Mounds Museum, Saracen Casino Resort, Arkansas Post Museum, the Historical Arkansas Museum, and others.
