= Tall Chief =

- Ki-hi-ka-steh-teh

Chief of the Quapaw Tribe, Peyote Roadman
- In office 1874–1918
- Preceded by: Lame Chief

Personal details
- Born: Wa-zhi Hunka; 1840 Indian Territory
- Died: August 26, 1918 (aged 77–78) Quapaw, OK
- Spouse(s): Zha-we Mi Te-ki, Mi Zhi-te, Wa si-sta, Mi Tsi-no, Emma Squirrel White
- Profession: Chief, peyote roadman
- Known for: Last hereditary Chief of the Quapaw Tribe to be chosen in the traditional manner

Tall Chief (ca. 1840–1918) was a hereditary chief of the Quapaw Tribe and a peyote roadman. He served in this position after his father, Lame Chief, died in 1874, until his own death in 1918 at around 78 years old.

Tall Chief was the last individual to be selected in the traditional manner from a hereditary chief line among the Quapaw people. Tall Chief also facilitated the introduction of the Peyote Religion among the Quapaw and Osage people.

== Early life ==
Tall Chief was born around 1840 in Indian Territory along the Neosho River in what is now Kansas at a Quapaw village referred to as Hu-cha-pa Tah-wha. His father was a hereditary Chief named Ka-hi-ka te-dah, or Lame Chief, and his mother was named Mi-ska no-zhe, or White Sun Standing; both of Tall Chief's parents were Quapaw. Tall Chief's given name was Wa-zhi Hunka which in the Quapaw language refers to an eagle in Quapaw tradition which led the people to the earth. Tall Chief would translate this name as "Sacred Angel Bird" which led to him receiving the English name "Louis Angel".

Around 1870, when Tall Chief was approximately 30 years old, the group of Quapaws he belonged to moved from Hu-cha-pa Tah-wha to a location near present-day Skiatook, Oklahoma.

== Chief of the Quapaw Tribe ==
Tall Chief's father Lame Chief died in 1874, at which point Tall Chief was chosen to succeed his father in his position in the traditional fashion. Multiple peace medals from European governments had been given to Quapaw Chiefs in the past; these were passed to Tall Chief and continue to be passed down among his descendants today.

Tall Chief was a highly respected leader of the Quapaw people and was often asked to name children, perform marriages, and officiate at tribal ceremonies. His testimony was also sought on many occasions for legal proceedings regarding Quapaw tribal members.

While serving as Chief, he became known as Ki-he-kah-steh-teh or "Tall Chief" on account of his height, which was further accentuated by his habit of wearing large hats with eagle feathers placed in them.

== Big Moon Native American Church ==
In the mid-1890s Tall Chief played an integral role in the introduction of the Peyote Religion or Native American Church to the Quapaw and Osage people.

The Big Moon variant of the Native American Church was founded by a Caddo and Delaware man known as John Wilson, who was also referred to as Moonhead. Wilson had been instructing the Delaware People in this ceremony when Tall Chief heard of it. Tall Chief requested Wilson to show him this ceremony, which resulted in Wilson officiating a peyote ceremony for Tall Chief near present-day Skiatook, OK. Tall Chief invited several Osage Chiefs, who then went on to embrace this religion.

Tall Chief also had Wilson introduce the ceremony to the group of Quapaw people who were living near the Spring River in what is now Quapaw, OK. Tallchief was instructed by Wilson and became a Roadman. Tallchief had a roundhouse where he held Native American Church meetings near Skiatook, OK, and in Quapaw, OK on his allotment, and also put down Native American Church fireplaces for several families among the Osage and Quapaw people.

== Death and legacy ==
Tall Chief died at his home on his allotment near the Spring River outside of the town of Quapaw, in Ottawa County, OK, in 1918 at the approximate age of 78.

Tall Chief Creek and Tall Chief Cove near Skiatok, OK were named after Tall Chief. Also a sculpture of Tall Chief was made which is now located at the John Zink Ranch. Also, "Kihekah-Steh Powwow" which was formed by the Indian Club of Skiatook and continues today was named after Tall Chief.

Photographs and some heirlooms from Tall Chief are on display at the Robert Whitebird Cultural Center.

== See also ==
- Quapaw Tribe
- Quapaw, Oklahoma
- Skiatook, Oklahoma
