= Quillwork =

Works decorated with overlays of porcupine quills or feathers

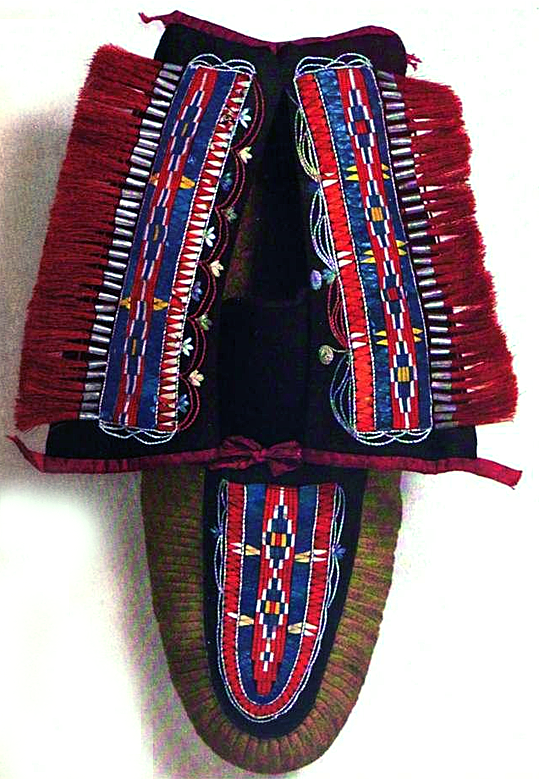
Wyandot quillwork moccasin

Quillwork is a form of textile embellishment traditionally practiced by Indigenous peoples of North America that employs the quills of porcupines as an aesthetic element. Quills from bird feathers were also occasionally used in quillwork.

== History ==
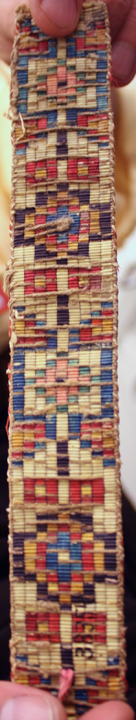
Backside of loomed quillwork collected from an Upper Missouri tribe by the Lewis and Clark Expedition, pre-1804. All natural dyes. Collection of the University of Pennsylvania Museum

Porcupine quillwork is an art form unique to North America. Before the introduction of glass beads, quillwork was a major decorative element used by the peoples who resided in the porcupine's natural habitat, which included indigenous peoples of the Subarctic, Northeastern Woodlands, and Northern Plains. The use of quills in designs spans from Maine to Alaska. Quillworking tools were discovered in Alberta, Canada and date back to the 6th century CE.

Cheyenne oral history, as told by Picking Bones Woman to George Bird Grinnell, says quilling came to their tribe from a man who married a woman, who hid her true identity as a buffalo. His son was also a buffalo. The man visited his wife and son in their buffalo home and while among the buffalo, the man learned the art of quilling, which he shared with the women of his tribe. The crafting society of the highest esteem was the Quilling Society. The quillers were a select group of elite women. Joining the Cheyenne Quilling Society was a prestigious honor for Cheyenne women. The Cheyenne believe that the highest virtue and aspiration is the seeking of knowledge. Their main spirit or deity is Heammawihio (The Wise One Above) who possesses his power through wisdom. All spirits gain power through their knowledge and their ability to share it with the people. The rituals of the crafting societies are structured with a mentor instructing an apprentice in the skills of the craft. The process and ritual that accompanied the production of these crafts (especially quilled crafts) constituted a ceremony of sacred significance. In this way the crafting societies added the additional element of acquired knowledge and experience, which the Cheyenne highly regarded and considered sacred. This would create a system where the people are seeking to possess a piece of the knowledge and skill of the crafter in tangible terms, and this creates a heightened value on the imagery itself. The craft is their act of knowledge seeking, and as such, was a sacred act. In this way, the women with more experience gained greater status in the crafting society. The master and apprentice roles were always present in the crafting societies, as the older women would always have more knowledge due to their lifetime of dedication to the craft. Upon entering the Society, women would work first on quilling moccasins, then cradleboards, rosettes for men's shirts and tipis, and ultimately, hide robes and backrests.

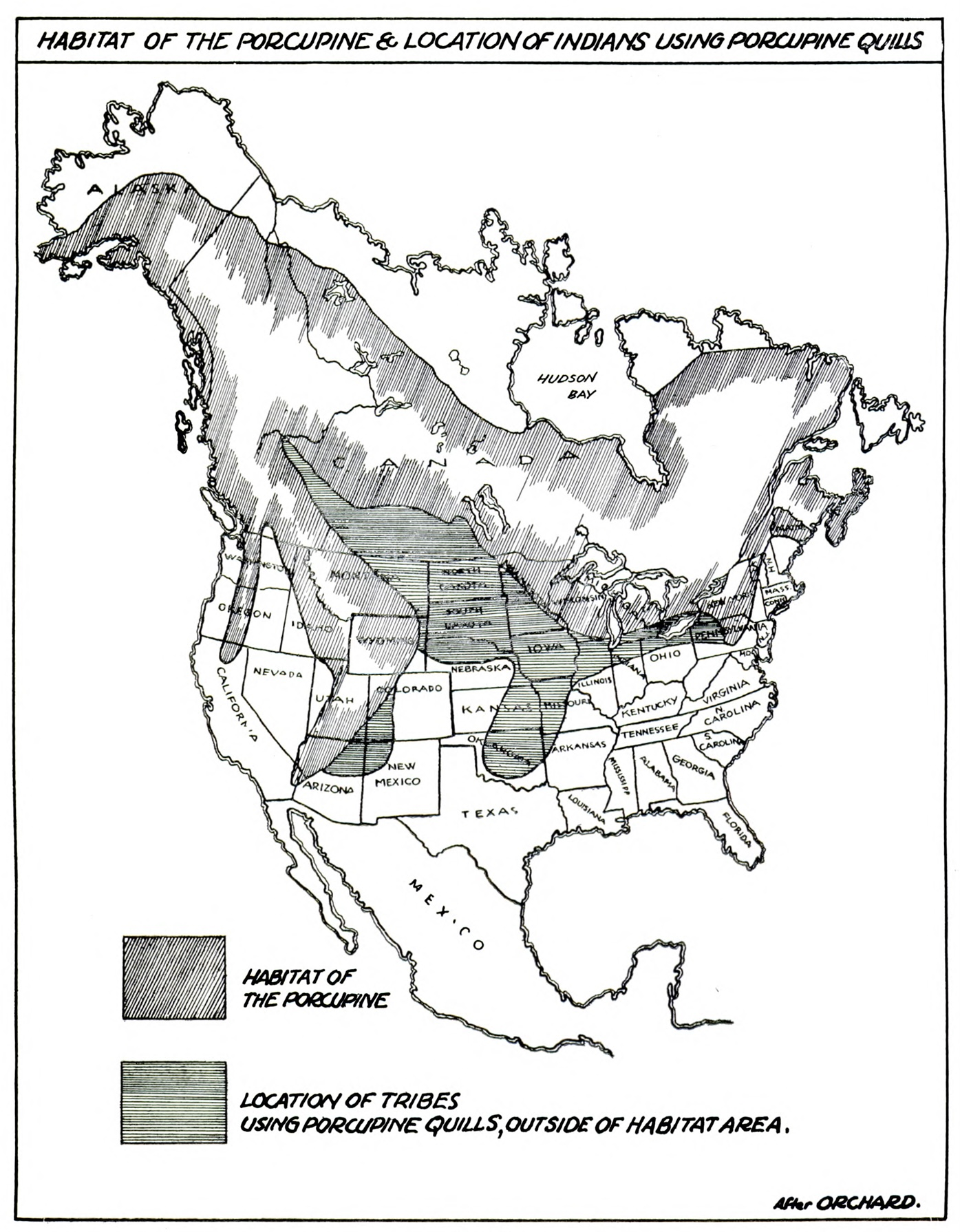
Map from Quill and Beadwork of the Western Sioux (Indian Handcraft Series, 1940) showing "habitat of the porcupine and location of Indians using porcupine quills"

The Blackfoot Native American tribe in the Northwest region of North America also put much significance on women who did quillwork. For the Blackfoot, women doing Quillwork had a religious purpose to it such as wearing special face paint that consisted of yellow ochre and animal fat which would be mixed in the palm of one's hand and then a 'V' marking would be made across the forehead to the nose; This face paint was meant to protect the women who was participating in quillwork and would always be done before doing so. Red paint would then be used to draw a vertical line from the bridge of the nose to the forehead and altogether this would resemble the foot of a crow. They would also wear sacred necklaces each time they did quillwork as another form of protection. When a woman would become too old to continue her craft she would have a younger woman become an initiate, generally a relative, so that the craft could be passed on. Being a woman who made quillwork in the Blackfoot tribe held major importance as the few women who did quillwork would choose who would become the next to assume the craft of quillwork. After being initiated, the young woman would be expected to craft a moccasin and would then take it and place it on top of a hill as a form of offering to the sun.

The Arapaho and Odawa tribes also had religious significance for women in Quillwork as their works would represent sacred beings and connections to nature. Colors and shapes also had unique meanings allowing for diverse and unique designs carrying many cultural or religious meanings. The Odawa tribe in particular used many of the same colors as the Blackfoot tribe with the addition of white, yellow, purple, and gold.

Porcupine quills often adorned rawhide and tanned hides, but during the 19th century, quilled birch bark boxes were a popular trade item to sell to European-Americans among Eastern and Great Lakes tribes. Quillwork was used to create and decorate a variety of Native American items, including those of daily usage to Native American men and women. These include clothing such as coats and moccasins, accessories such as bags and belts, and furniture attachments such as a cradle cover.

== Technique ==
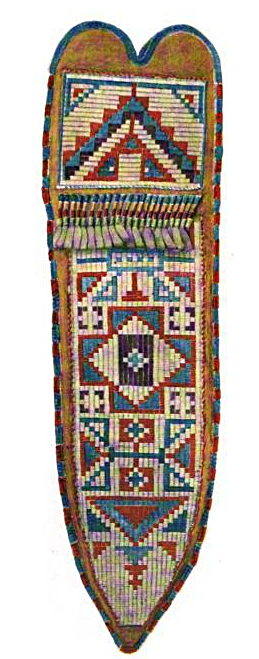
A quillwork knife sheath.

Quills suitable for embellishment are two to three inches long and may be dyed before use. In their natural state, the quills are pale yellow to white with black tips. The tips are usually snipped off before use. Quills readily take dye, which originally was derived from local plants and included a wide spectrum of colors, with black, yellow, and red being the most common. By the 19th century, aniline dyes were available through trade and made dyeing easier.

The quills can be flattened with specific bone tools or by being run through one's teeth. Awls were used to punch holes in hides, and sinew, later replaced by European thread, was used to bind the quills to the hides.

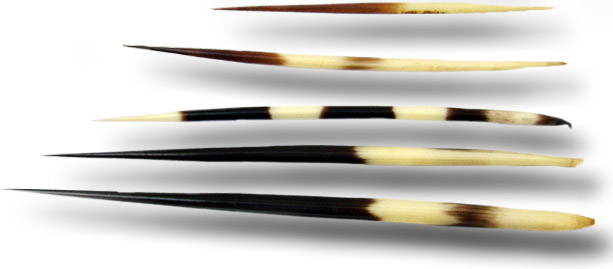
Undyed porcupine quills

The four most common techniques for quillwork are appliqué, embroidery, wrapping, and loom weaving. Appliquéd quills are stitched into hide in a manner that covers the stitches. In wrapping, a single quill may be wrapped upon itself or two quills may be intertwined.

Quills can be appliquéd singly to form curvilinear patterns, as found on Odawa pouches from the 18th century. This technique lends itself to floral designs popularized among northeastern tribes by Ursuline nuns. Wyandot women excelled at floral quillwork during the 18th and 19th centuries.

Plains quillwork is characterized by bands of rectangles creating geometrical patterns found also in Plains painting. Rosettes of concentric circles of quillwork commonly adorned historical Plains men's shirts, as did parallel panels of quillwork on the sleeves. These highly abstracted designs had layers of symbolic meaning.

The Red River Ojibwe of Manitoba created crisp, geometric patterns by weaving quills on a loom in the 19th century.

== Today ==
Quillwork never died out as a living art form in the Northern Plains. Some communities that had lost their quillwork tradition have been able to revive the art form. For instance, no women quilled in the Dene community of Wha Ti, Northwest Territories by the late 1990s. The Dene Cultural Institute held two workshops there in 1999 and 2000, effectively reviving quillwork in Wha Ti.

The art form is very much alive today. Examples of contemporary, award-winning quillworkers include Juanita Growing Thunder Fogarty, (Sioux-Assiniboine) artist; Dorothy Brave Eagle (Oglala Lakota) of Denver, Colorado; Kanatiiosh (Akwesasne Mohawk) of St. Regis Mohawk Reservation; Sarah Hardisty (Dene) of Jean Marie River, Northwest Territories; Leonda Fast Buffalo Horse (Blackfeet) of Browning, Montana;, Melissa Peter-Paul, Mi'kmaw of Epekwitk/Prince Edward Island, and Deborah Magee Sherer (Blackfeet) of Cut Bank, Montana.

== See also ==
- Hair drop, men's ornaments typically featuring quillwork
