= Indian Arts and Crafts Board =

United States government agency

The Museum of the Plains Indian in Browning, Montana, founded in 1941, is one of three museums operated by the Indian Arts and Crafts Board.

The Indian Arts and Crafts Board (IACB) is an agency within the United States Department of the Interior whose mission is to "promote the economic development of American Indians and Alaska Natives through the expansion of the Indian arts and crafts market." It was established by Congress in 1935. It is headquartered at the Main Interior Building in Washington, D.C.

== Scope ==
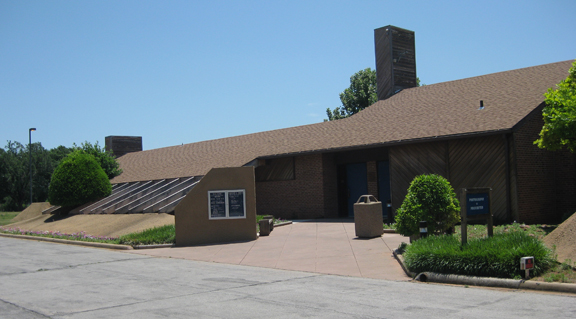
Southern Plains Indian Museum in Anadarko, Oklahoma, operated by the Indian Arts and Crafts Board

The board provides advice and promotional activities and oversees the implementation of the Indian Arts and Crafts Act of 1990, a truth-in-advertising law attempting to stop non-Native-made artworks from being sold as Native-made.

The IACB also operates three museums:

- Sioux Indian Museum, housed in the Journey Museum in Rapid City, South Dakota
- Museum of the Plains Indian in Browning, Montana
- Southern Plains Indian Museum in Anadarko, Oklahoma.

The IACB also publishes informative consumer education publications which are available for free download via its website. These publications include: the Indian Arts and Crafts Act, How to Buy Authentic Navajo (Diné) Weavings, and Alaska Native Ivory, among many others.

== Source directory ==
The Board publishes the online "Source Directory of American Indian and Alaska Native Owned and Operated Arts and Crafts Businesses," which lists more than 400 artists and businesses. These businesses include American Indian or Alaska Native arts and crafts enterprises; businesses and galleries privately owned and operated by American Indian or Alaska Native people; individual artists who are enrolled citizens of federally recognized tribes; and a few nonprofit organizations that develop and market art and craft products and that are managed by enrolled citizens of federally recognized tribes. Some of the businesses listed in the Source Directory maintain retail shops or open studios; others sell by appointment or mail order only.

== See also ==
- Indian Handcraft Series
