= Barbara Kyser-Collier =

Quapaw business person from Oklahoma, U.S.

- Mi ska nah bo nah

Personal details
- Born: Oklahoma
- Known for: Helping develop Quapaw Nation flag, administration, and economy through Native American gaming

Barbara Kyser-Collier is a Native American businesswoman and tribal administrator from the Quapaw Nation. Born in Oklahoma into the Beaver Clan, she maintained a career in Quapaw Nation tribal government, and other local tribes such as the Wyandotte.

== Career ==
She first worked at the Seneca Indian School in 1968. Kyser-Collier started working for the Quapaw Nation in 1974, and was one of the first employees to work for the Quapaw Nation government. She advanced from a position as secretary/bookkeeper, to comptroller, and, eventually, tribal administrator. Working with Lloyd Buffalo and Walter King, she developed ideas for the Quapaw tribal flag; she drew the original design of the flag on cardboard.

Kyser-Collier has been involved in the development of gaming casinos by the Quapaw Nation. In 2016 she was named Indian Gaming "Regulator of the Year". In addition, she has served as secretary of the National Tribal Gaming Commissioners/Regulators, and she was the charter chairperson for the Oklahoma Tribal Gaming Regulators Association.

She is currently the Chair of the Quapaw Cultural Committee, and also serves on the Ogahpah Wisdom Keepers. In this capacity she has involvement in a number of tribal events, a significant example being the 200th anniversary of the Quapaw Treaty of 1824.
