= Saracen (Quapaw chief) =

19th-century Quapaw leader

- Sarazin

Quapaw leader

Personal details
- Born: c. 1735 Arkansas Post, Louisiana
- Died: c. 1832 (aged 97) Jefferson County, Arkansas Territory
- Resting place: St. Joseph's Cemetery, Pine Bluff, Arkansas
- Parent: François Sazarin (father)

Saracen (French: Sarazin; c. 1735 – c. 1832), also known as Sarazen, was a 19th-century Quapaw leader who rendered an important service to a trapper family living in present-day Jefferson County, Arkansas, by restoring to them two of their children, which had been taken captive by the Chickasaw.

== Early life ==
Saracen was born around 1735 at Arkansas Post, Louisiana. His father, François Sazarin (c. 1720s–1763), was an interpreter at Arkansas Post and the son of Nicholas and Anne (née Rolland) Sazarin, who resided there. François married or had a common-law union with a Quapaw woman, who was Saracen's mother. As such, Saracen was a member of the Quapaw Nation. François married Marie Lepine, a Frenchwoman, in 1752; but it is not known how long she lived. The Pine Bluff Commercial credited her in a 2019 article as Saracen's mother, but this does not seem likely.

== Indian removal ==
During the 1820s, Saracen was recognized by Arkansas Territorial Governor James Miller as chief of the Quapaw, although he had no hereditary claim to that position. He was one of two signatories to the treaty of 1824 in which the Quapaw were pressured to cede land in Arkansas to the United States government in exchange for land with the Caddo people on the Red River in northeastern Louisiana. The Quapaw moved there in early 1826. After floods destroyed their crops, 60 people died of starvation, including Saracen's wife. Saracen led one-fourth of the Quapaw back to land reserved for them on the Arkansas River, which they reached in 1827.

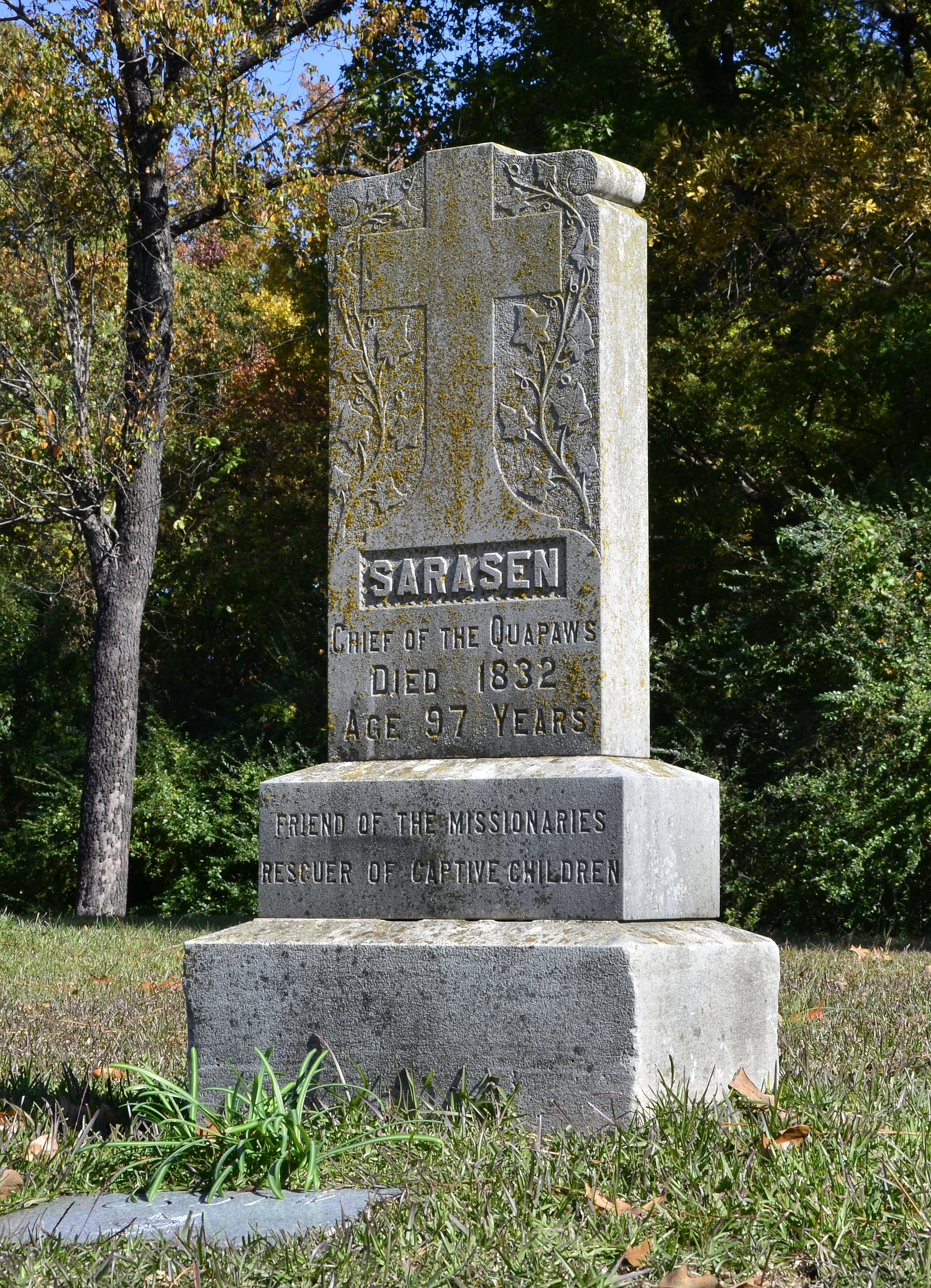
Grave of Saracen in the St. Joseph's Cemetery at Pine Bluff, Arkansas, in 2015.

During this time, the Quapaw were being treated harshly by the American government. They splintered into two assemblies, those led by chief Heckaton, the traditional leader, and those who were grouped with Saracen by James Miller, Governor of the Arkansas Territory. Miller appointed Saracen as chief of the latter group.

Saracen witnessed the removal of his people from traditional land in Arkansas to Indian Territory. Because of his mixed-blood, he had no rights to the role of hereditary chief. He was considered a war chief and headman of the Quapaw and Anglo-Americans considered him a chief because of his deeds.

In a letter dated January 10, 1827, written by Arkansas Territorial Governor George Izard, to William H. Keating, a geologist affiliated with the American Philosophical Society, Izard said that Saracen was:

a half-breed...who is the most distinguished of their warriors. This hero, poet and musician ranks as a Chief in some respects; he is permitted to wear medals and assist at their Councils, but his honours are altogether personal and will not descend to his eldest son, as is the case with the other Chiefs whose blood is purely Indian.

== Later life ==
In 1833, Saracen was a signatory to a treaty with the United States in which the Quapaw agreed to cede their remaining territory in Arkansas and to relocate to the northeastern corner of the Indian Territory. Saracen remained in Jefferson County, Arkansas, until his death and was buried at the "old Dardenne place." In 1905, Saracen's remains were reinterned in the St. Joseph's Cemetery at Pine Bluff, Arkansas, under the direction of Rt. Rev. J. M. Lucey. His 20th-century gravestone inaccurately states that Saracen died in 1832, as he is documented as living beyond that year.

== Legacy ==
Saracen's 20th-century gravestone is inscribed, "Friend of the Missionaries. Rescuer of Captive Children." He rendered an important service to a trapper family living in present-day Jefferson County, Arkansas, by restoring to them two of their children, which had been taken captive by the Chickasaw. Saracen rowed down the Arkansas River the night of the abduction and located a Chickasaw camp near Arkansas Post, where Saracen "lifted up his tomahawk and gave the Quapaw war cry". The Chickasaw fled, leaving the children behind. For his action, Saracen was presented a presidential medal by James Miller, Governor of the Arkansas Territory. Morris S. Arnold, a 21st-century historian of colonial Arkansas, notes that while the white neighbors considered Saracen a hero, he "did not fare nearly so well among many of the Quapaws." He suggests that Saracen felt that he was a "person in between" cultures.

== Honors ==
In 1888, a memorial window was placed in St. Joseph's Church, Pine Bluff, to the honor of Saracen. In 2007, Lake Pine Bluff, a 500 acres (200 ha) lake in downtown Pine Bluff, was renamed Lake Saracen. A public art display in Pine Bluff includes a mural by Robert Dafford dedicated to "Quapaw Chief Saracen, rescuer of the stolen children and legendary hero of Jefferson County". In 2019, Saracen Casino Resort in Pine Bluff was named after him.
