= Melissa Peter-Paul =

Mi'kmaw Artist from Prince Edward Island

Melissa Peter-Paul is a Mi'kmaw artist from Abegweit First Nation, Epekwitk/Prince Edward Island. Her work is primarily Mi'kmaq quillwork, and utilizes porcupine quills, along with birch bark, sweet grass, and spruce root. She has won multiple awards for her work, which has been featured in group exhibitions in Prince Edward Island, Nova Scotia, and Maine, as well as publications. In addition to her quillwork, Peter-Paul has designed a crosswalk in Charlottetown. In 2019, the city was also the location of her first solo exhibition.

Peter-Paul lives on Epekwitk, with her two sons.

== Background ==
Quillwork is a traditional Mi'kmaq craft, but is no longer commonly practised. Peter-Paul's great-great-grandmother was a quiller, and examples of her work can be found in the Nova Scotia Archives. Peter-Paul was first introduced to the craft by her cousin. Additionally, her parents help her harvest ingredients for her work.

Peter-Paul considers her work a revival of the art form, as well as carrying on her family tradition. She has stated, "The ancestors' presence when I do quillwork is so strong and I really feed off of it", as well as that it is "integral" to her identity as a Mi'kmaw person. Her work is grounded in nature, and she has spoken about the connection between the natural work, her work, and her heritage: "“When I’m on the land, I am reminded that my family’s ancestors also walked in these woods, and I am following their path.” She is a founding member of The Quill Sisters, "a community of skilled quill workers on Epekwitk that seeks to revitalize the traditional art form through collaborative projects".

== Awards & Recognition ==
- In 2022, quill work by Peter-Paul was featured on library cards by the P.E.I. Public Library Service.
- Atlantic Indigenous Artist Award, 2023
- The Leo Chevierie Cultural Connector of the Year Award, 2023
