= Hair drop =

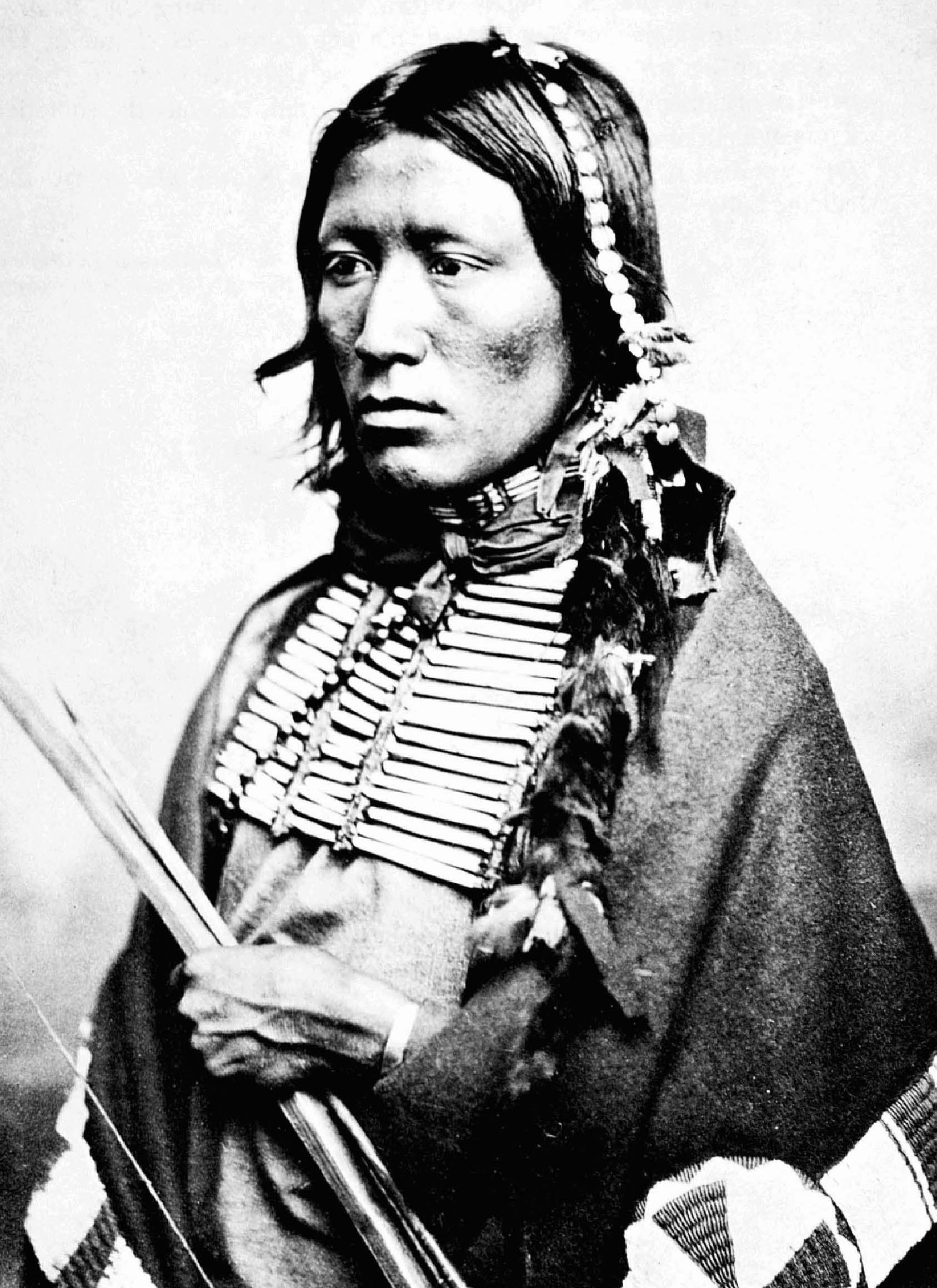
Nephew of Pacer (Iron Sack), head chief of the Kiowa-Apaches, wearing a hair drop

A hair drop is an ornament worn by men from Great Lakes and Plains tribes. It would be tied to the man's hair. The typical example consists of a quilled or beaded section on a strip of leather, which was later attached to an American buffalo tail. They could be over two feet long.

Early hair drops were decorated with porcupine quillwork.

As more Europeans arrived on Plains Indian lands in the later 19th century, glass beadwork became more common. Hair drops are frequently adorned with tin cones, silver, and feathers. The horse hair drop can be dyed for effect. One 1870 Cheyenne hair drop was adorned with peacock feathers.

In the late 19th century, hair drops incorporated German silver disks, known as hair plates. Hair plates were most popular from 1835 to 1870; however, they are still made today for powwow and ceremonial regalia. The men's hair drops are distinguished from women's hair plates, because the women wear theirs from belts at their waists.

Hair drops could have ceremonial importance. One Piegan Blackfeet hair drop was worn to bring prosperity and included horse hair to protect the owner's horse.

The term hair drop is also used for braids of human hair worn by Plains men, attached to adornment. For instance, hair drops have been attached to Kiowa mescal bean bandoleer worn in Native American Church regalia.

Today, 19th century hair drops are highly collectible and often sold by non-Native traders for thousands of dollars.
