= Amada Cardenas =

First federally licensed peyote dealer in the United States

Amada Sanchez Cardenas (1904 – 2005) was a Mexican-American woman, known for advocacy of the legalization of peyote for religious purposes and as the first federally licensed peyote dealer in the United States.

== Early life and background ==
Amada Sanchez was born on October 26, 1904, in Los Ojuelos, Texas, the daughter of Paula Guadiano and Ignacio Guerra. Though not a member of the Native American Church she dedicated her life to helping, Cardenas’ own faith (Catholicism) was of deep importance to her as she grew up.

In 1932, Amada Sanchez Cardena married Claudio Cardenas. Claudio and his family had immigrated to Los Ojuelos in 1901 from Hidalgo, a town in the Mexican state of Coahuila, seeking work as vaqueros. After their marriage, they stayed in Los Ojuelos to live next door to both their families, but eventually moved to Mirando City, an oil boomtown, in the 1940s. It was in Mirando City that the Cardenas became involved in the peyote trade.

== Becoming the first federally licensed dealer ==
Amada's was introduced to the peyote trade by her father, who was a peyote trader in Los Ojuelos in the early 1900s. Once married, Claudio and Amada quickly became well known in Mirando City as peyoteros (peyote traders), harvesting and selling peyote to members of the Native American Church in the United States and Canada.

The Cardenas family regarded their involvement in the peyote trade as a moral obligation, recognizing the plant's profound religious importance for members of the Native American Church. They regularly harvested, dried, and shipped peyote for approximately ten dollars to Church members across the United States for use in sacramental ceremonies. Despite their commitment, the Cardenases frequently encountered legal challenges related to peyote distribution. In 1953, after the U.S. Department of Agriculture advocated for a complete ban on peyote, Claudio Cardenas continued his efforts and was subsequently arrested by the FBI and detained in Laredo, Texas. The family sought the help of attorney Manuel J. Raymond, who, following the dismissal of charges against Claudio, initiated efforts to amend the Texas Narcotic Drug Act, ultimately removing "peyote" from the list of prohibited substances.

In 1957, Claudio and Amada were designated as Texas Delegates-At-Large for the Native American Church of North America.

After Claudio's unexpected death in 1967, Amada took over responsibility for the family's peyote business. Around the same time, the Texas Legislature passed the Texas Dangerous Drug Act, which made it illegal to possess peyote—even for religious ceremonies. This raised significant concerns among members of the Native American Church, who relied on peyote for sacramental use.

In 1968, Judge James Kazen of Texas's 49th District Court ruled that the state's peyote ban was unconstitutional when applied to sincere religious use by members of the Native American Church. His decision in State of Texas v. David Clark resulted in the case being dismissed and marked a key moment in the legal recognition of Native American religious rights. In 1969, the Texas Legislature responded by changing the law to allow members of the Native American Church to use peyote for religious purposes, as long as they had at least 25 percent Native American ancestry.

After the Texas Narcotic Law was amended, the peyote trade became more formally regulated. Distributors were required to obtain licenses from both the federal government and the State of Texas, keep detailed transaction records, and sell only to approved Native American Church members who met specific requirements. In the 1970s, Amada was one of the first peyote dealers to receive a permit from the Texas Department of Safety. She also maintained a guest book where visitors recorded their names, tribal affiliations, and purchases—creating a lasting record of the many people who visited the peyote gardens over the years.

In 1987, Cardenas was appointed as an officer of the Native American Church of the United States.

Cardenas died in 2005.
