= Native American Church =

Native American religion

- The symbol of the Native American Church
- Type: Syncretic, religious syncretic
- Classification: Native American
- Founder: Quanah Parker
- Origin: 19th century United States
- Separations: Big moon peyotism
- Members: 250,000

The Native American Church (NAC), also known as Peyotism and Peyote Religion, is a syncretic Native American religion that teaches a combination of traditional Native American beliefs and elements of Christianity, especially pertaining to some of the Ten Commandments, with sacramental use of the entheogen peyote. The religion originated in the Oklahoma Territory (1890–1907) in the late nineteenth century, after peyote was introduced to the southern Great Plains from Mexico. Today, it is the most widespread indigenous religion among Native Americans in the United States (except Alaska Natives and Native Hawaiians), Canada (specifically First Nations people in Saskatchewan and Alberta), and Mexico, with an estimated 300,000 adherents.

== History ==
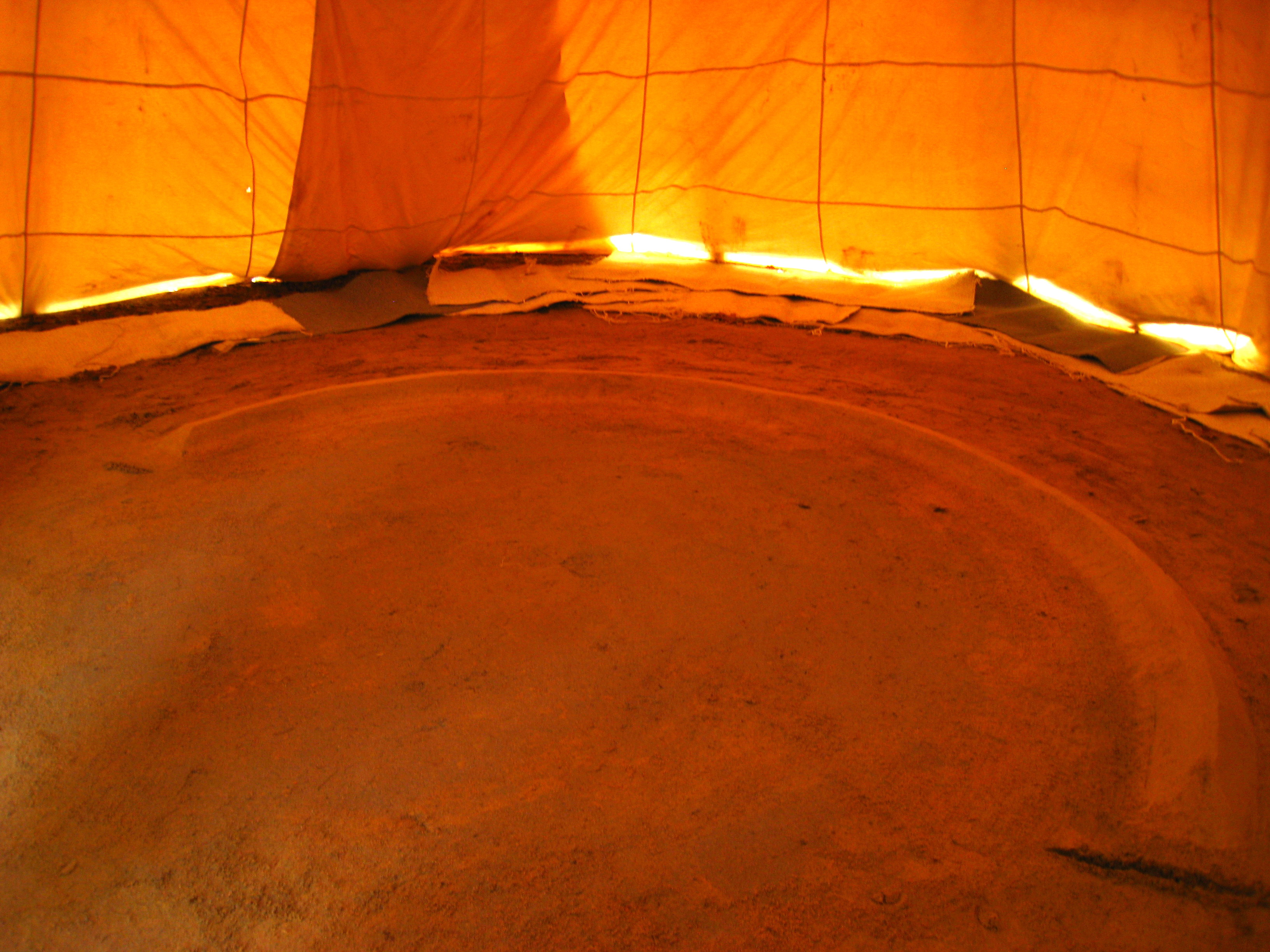
Peyote road

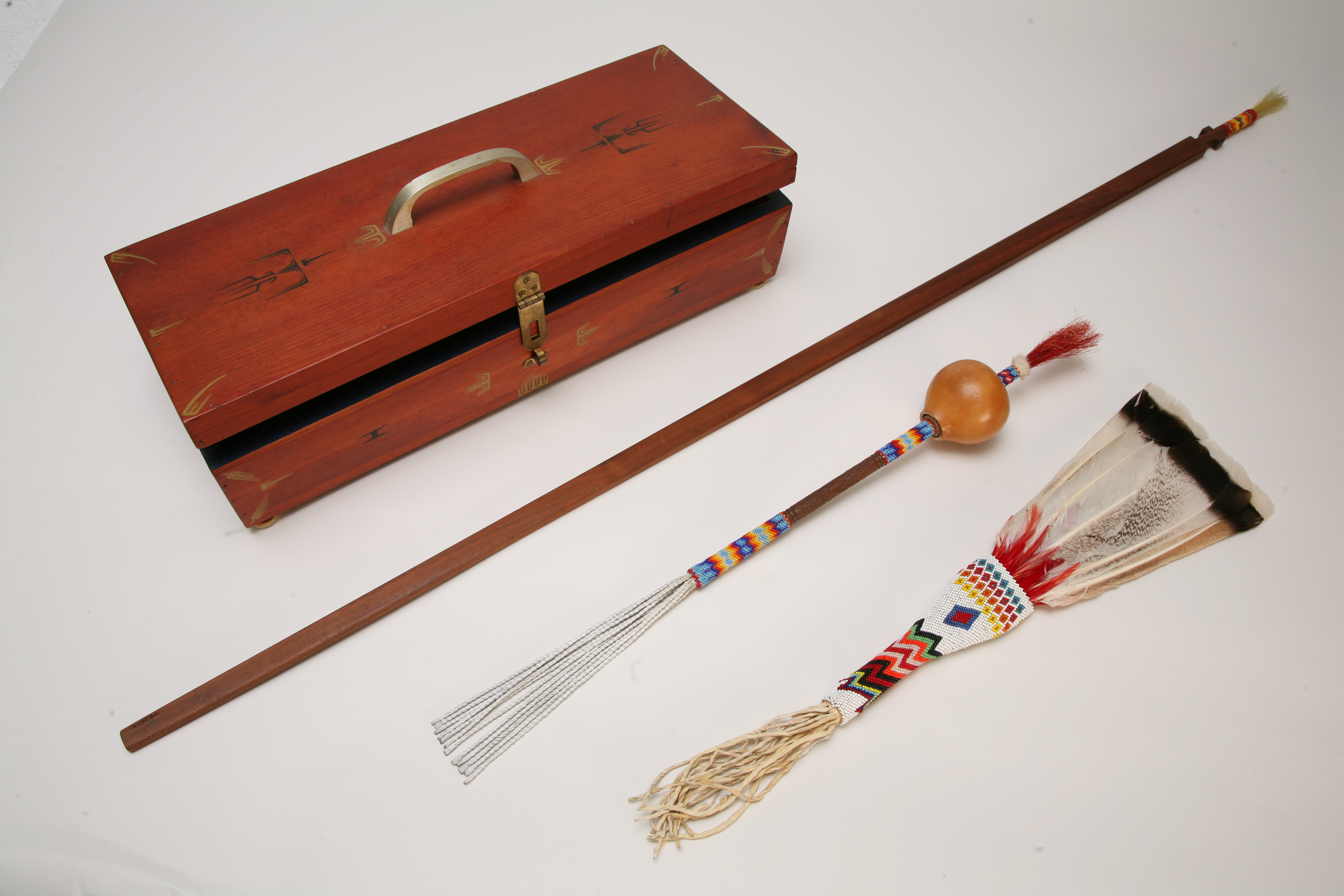
A peyote set such as this is used by the medicine man during the peyote ritual.

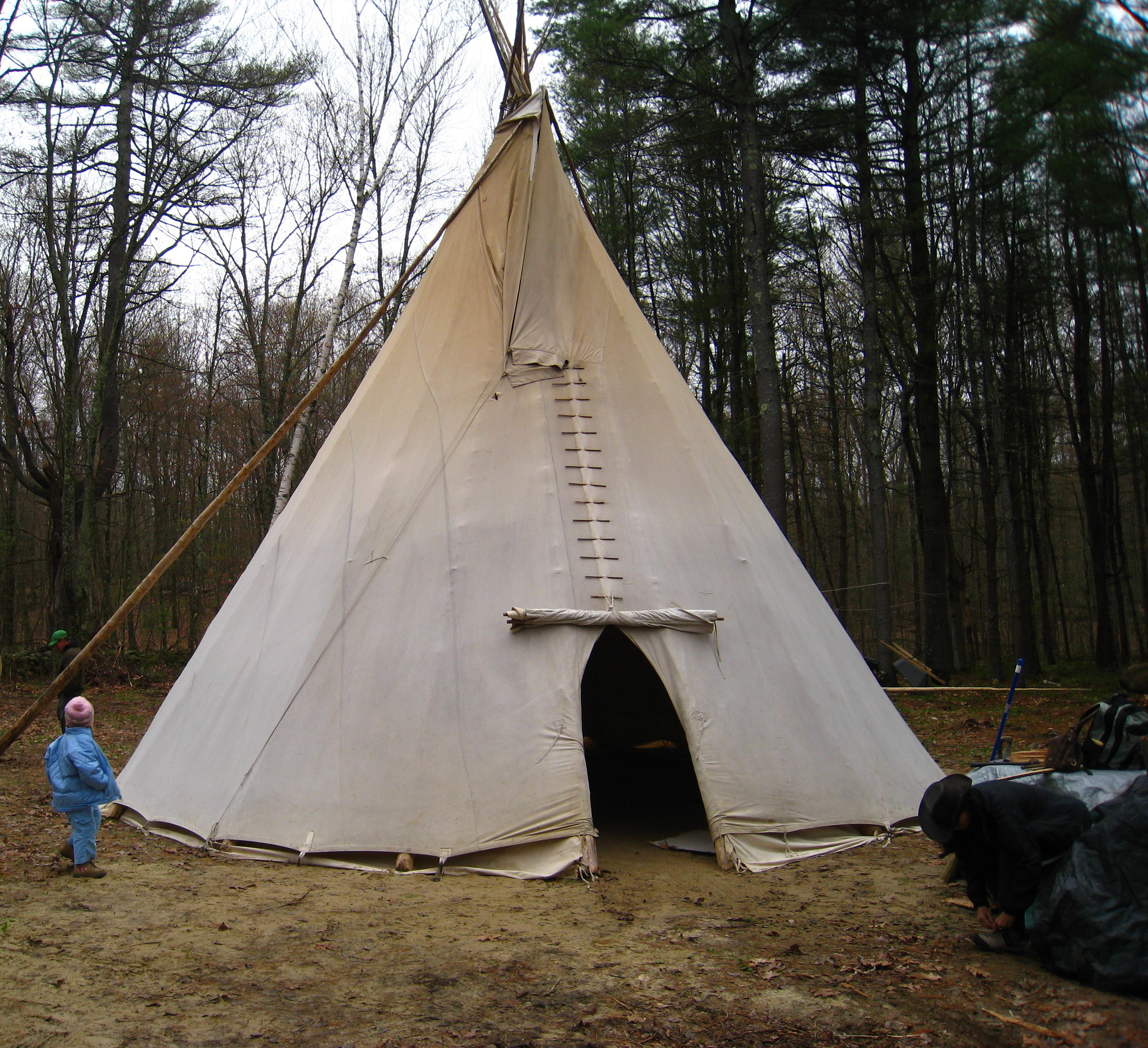
Peyote ceremony tipi

Historically, many denominations of mainstream Christianity attempted to convert Native Americans to Christianity in the Western Hemisphere. These efforts were partially successful, because the religious practices, including those of the Native American Church, of many Native American tribes reflect Christian creeds. Although conversion to Christianity was a slow process, the tenets of the Native American Church were more readily accepted.

Originally formed in the Oklahoma Territory, the Native American Church is monotheistic, believing in a supreme being called the Great Spirit. It was officially created in 1918. The tenets of the Native American Church regard peyote as a sacred and holy sacrament and use it as a means to communicate with the Great Spirit (God), also referred to as the Creator.

== Beliefs of the church ==
Disease and death are believed to be a result of an imbalance in the individual. Besides peyote, other sacred plants, prayer, and fasting are used to cure this imbalance. Use of peyote is never for recreational purposes and the hallucinogenic effects of the plant are considered spiritual visions. To most Native Americans, visions are a communion with the metaphysical. However, not every member experiences hallucinogenic effects during peyote rituals. The plant is meant to heal or fix social, personal, and communal problems. Members believe the plant is safe for children and pregnant women.

== Relationship to Christianity ==
Some Native Americans dislike the beliefs of Christianity because of the history between natives and European Christian groups. Missionaries' attempts to alter or remove aspects of American Natives' heritage and culture have left many unable to reconcile with Christianity. On the other hand, some members are comfortable with a syncretic spiritual way that combines their Indigenous ways with some aspects of Christianity. The church included Protestant characteristics in its formation.

== Sects and differing traditions ==
There are multiple sects or traditions, or "ways" within the Native American Church. Two main ones are the Half-Moon way and the Cross-fire way. The Half-Moon way was introduced in 1914 or 1924, by James Seymour, who was a part of the Winnebago tribe. There are multiple differences between the Cross-fire way and the Half-Moon way. In the Cross-fire way, a Bible is placed on an altar, baptism is practiced, and a minister is present. While in the Half-Moon way, no Bible is used, baptism is not practiced, and ministers are not present. Many Cross-fire adherents, such as the Dakota Cross-fire and Winnebago Cross-fire members, strongly oppose the use of tobacco and smoking in rituals and ceremonies. This seems to stem from the opposition at the time of many Protestant sects to the use of tobacco rather than being influenced by just one sect, such as the Jehovah's Witnesses. Historically, peyotists in the Winnebago and Wilson moon tribes preached in meetings, prophesied, and performed baptisms.

=== Menomini Peyotism ===
Historically, Peyotism among the Menominee people is unique. Prayers were said in Menomini and ended with "In the name of the Father, the Son, and the Holy Ghost. Amen" (this may be said in the Menomini version or in English), taken from the Trinitarian Baptismal Formula. Christian symbols were apparent in prayers, speeches, as well as paraphernalia. Catholicism was familiar, and many Catholic beliefs and practices were incorporated as a result of years of Catholic missionaries; however so, Protestantism has definitely had an influence.

=== Differences in fireplaces ===
In the Native American Church, there are two main umbrella fireplaces (ceremonial peyote altars passed down generationally from family) that are conducted: the Half-Moon fireplace and the Cross-Fire fireplace.

Half-Moon fireplace:

- Uses a half-moon shaped sand altar, the color of sand and size used varying between tribes
- Uses tobacco and corn-shucks during main sections of the service
- Coal design patterns differ from tribe to tribe during the service
- Staff is passed around the tipi during singing sections
- Main four ceremonial songs sung

Cross-Fire fireplace:

- Uses a horseshoe shaped sand altar, with a corresponding mound outside of the tipi parallel to the firepit – to represent the "grave of Jesus Christ"
- No tobacco used
- Staff is placed upright in the ground and does not get passed around the ceremony during singing sections
- Bible sections are recited and used according to the family's prayer for the particular service
- Cross design within the coals to represent certain elements of Jesus Christ
- Mainly Christian peyote songs sung, with the main four ceremonial songs appended to the Cross-fire

There are many variations of each fireplace, and they depend greatly on tribe and environment. There are also special fireplaces that do not fit exactly into either main style, so the above list is not definitive.

== National organizational structure ==
Within the United States, there are two main umbrella chapters of the Native American Church:

- Native American Church of the United States – the original 1913 charter enabled in Oklahoma territory. All chapters with this designation have no blood quantum requirements to attend ceremonies and all races, generally, are welcome. Most tribes that adopted the NAC early have an original chapter enacted with this charter.
- Native American Church of North America – an offshoot that originates from the late 1960s, the NAC of North America only allows Native Americans with a blood quantum of 1/4 or more to attend. This is enforced by tribal police via checking Certificates of Degree of Indian or Alaska Native Blood (CDIBs) and NAC membership cards. While in the minority nationally, major community figures in the peyote world are actively involved and defend its decision to only allow Native Americans to attend.

There are other tribal-specific offshoots of both umbrella chapters, notably the Navajo, with major chapters in both states representing both the original charter and the NAC of North America.

== Ceremony and roles ==
Followers of the Native American Church have differing ceremonies, celebrations, and ways of practicing their religion. For example, among the Lakota, the Cross-fire group uses the Bible for sermons, which the Half-Moon followers reject, even though they each teach a similar Christian morality. Ceremonies commonly last all night, beginning Saturday evening and ending early Sunday morning. Scripture reading, prayer, singing, and drumming are included. In general, the Native American Church believes in one supreme God, the Great Spirit, and the Trinity (God, Jesus, and the Holy Ghost), which is represented by the three leaders present in Half-Moon rituals.

Ceremonies are generally held in a tipi and services must be conducted by a priest, pastor, or elder, known as the Roadman. The Roadman is assisted by a Fireman, who cares for the holy fireplace, ensuring it burns consistently all night. The Roadman may use a prayer staff, a beaded and feathered gourd, a small drum, cedar, and his eagle feather to conduct services. The Roadman's wife or other female relative prepares four sacramental foods and the "second breakfast" that are part of the church services. Her part takes place very early, between 4:30 and 5:00 in the morning. The four sacramental foods are water, shredded beef or "sweet meat," corn mush, and a variety of berries. The sweet foods were added later to counterbalance the bitterness of the peyote consumed during the services. The second breakfast is like a typical American breakfast. It generally includes boiled eggs, toast, hash brown potatoes, coffee, and juice. This meal is served well after sunrise and just prior to the closing of the church services.

Church services are not regular Sunday occurrences but are conducted upon special request by a family, whether to celebrate a birthday, or hold a memorial or funeral service. Services begin at sundown on a Friday or Saturday evening and end at sunrise. Thus, a participant "sits up" all night, giving up a full night's rest as part of a small sacrifice to the Holy Spirit and Jesus.

The church service ends the following day with a feast for the whole community, attended by all the participating members who are wide awake due to peyote, a stimulant. They generally do not feel the need to sleep until late afternoon, particularly after the feast. The sponsoring family then gives gifts to the Roadman and all his helpers to show their deep appreciation for their work.

Common reasons for holding a service include the desire to cure illness, birthday celebrations, Christian holidays (such as Easter or Christmas), school graduations, and other significant life events.

== Music ==
Music during prayer services consists of the singer with his gourd rattle staff and the water-drummer with his water-drum. The singer sings four songs, concludes his set, and passes the staff, gourd, and drum to the next relative to sing.

There are only two musical instruments used in an authentic Native American Church prayer service:

- Peyote gourd rattle – a gourd rattle made of wood (beaded and non-beaded), raw gourd shell, and sea stones used to sing peyote songs throughout the service. The wood is usually strong, hard-wood like Gabon ebony and Bodark to produce the appropriate tune for the rattle.
- Water drum – a metal drum (usually cast-iron, brass or aluminum) filled with water and tied down with marbles/stones with an appropriate animal hide. When tied correctly, it produces a deep tone that can be manipulated with the thumb on the hide to change the sound as a relative is singing.

Peyote songs of the Native American Church are in the peyote language, which parallels words in the Coahuilteco and Comecrudo languages of South Texas. This language makes up all peyote songs sung around all fireplaces, no matter what tribe or denomination nationally. The language was introduced by the Carrizo and Coahuiltecan people of South Texas and is what people consider "straight" peyote songs.

That being said, many tribes incorporate their own language into peyote songs, which will assign that particular song to one particular tribe, instead of it being represented in an intertribal way as a "straight" song.

== Artwork ==
Along with the founding of the Native American Church came new artwork and art techniques. European trade materials such as beads and metal were incorporated into artwork. Therefore, the category of "peyote art" includes traditional and contemporary styles. Many art pieces are ritual instruments or for ceremonial settings. These art objects include gourd rattles made of hardwoods, glass beads, leather fringe, and dyed horsehair. Furthermore, most objects, if they are associated with the church, are produced by men. Feather fans can be made from feathers from a variety of birds, including hawk, golden eagle, scissortail, magpie, macaw and other parrots, pheasant, roadrunner, and waterbird. These fans are one of the most important objects related to the church because they represent the bird symbolism in the religion. Moreover, there are also drum sticks and ritual staffs with carvings of tipis, birds, stars, sun patterns, and other symbols important to the church. However, there are also non-instrumental art pieces, such as paintings and jewelry.

== Persecution and law ==
As the United States government became more involved in the control of drugs, the Native American Church faced possible legal issues regarding their use of peyote. The American Indian Religious Freedom Act of 1978, also called the American Indian Religious Freedom Act (AIRFA), was passed to provide legal protection for the Church's use of the plant.

In 1970, President Richard Nixon signed the Controlled Substances Act (CSA), which prohibited the possession of psychedelics such as peyote in the United States and classified them as controlled drugs. Instead, federal rulings such as US v. Boyll (1991) and the Religious Freedom Restoration Act of 1993 allow members of the Native American Church to transport, possess, and use peyote for religious purposes. While such use has been declared legal without regard to race or tribal status in all US states other than Idaho and Texas, which have outlawed use by non-natives, the purchase of peyote from licensed distributors can only be made via permit by enrolled tribal members, who also must intend to use it for religious purposes only. These distributors, located in Texas near the Mexican border, sell wild peyote gathered in its native range by collectors licensed by the U.S. Drug Enforcement Administration and the Texas Department of Public Safety, as Amada Cardenas was. Cultivation of peyote is legal under the same circumstances as possession, where the cultivator must be licensed and prove that plants are for use in Native American Church ceremonies or, in some states, for general religious ceremonies.

The Neo-American Church tried to claim LSD and marijuana as sacraments, seeking protection similar to that afforded to peyote use by the Native American Church. The courts ruled against them. The Peyote Way Church of God's failed federal lawsuit was rendered partially successful when the Arizona legislature (Ariz. Rev. Stat. § 13-3402) expanded the permitted use of peyote if connected "with the bona fide practice of a religious belief and as an integral part of religious exercise." Colorado, New Mexico, Nevada and Oregon also allow for general religious use.

== Influential people ==
Prominent figures in the church's development include Chevato, Jim Aton, John Wilson, and Jonathan Koshiway. These people, and many others, played important roles in the introduction and adoption of the Native American Church.

Victor Griffin, known as the last chief of the Quapaw tribe, was noted for facilitating the incorporation of the Native American Church under Oklahoma law in 1911. He also helped spread the religion to some other related tribes in the region.

Led by James Mooney, early 20th-century anthropologists helped Peyotists by providing testimonies before legislative bodies and later encouraging the movement's leaders to consolidate peyote use into an established religion whose practice would be protected by law.

The Native American novelist N. Scott Momaday gives a highly accurate portrayal of the peyote service in his book House Made of Dawn.

Reuben Snake was a Ho-Chunk roadman and worked towards the establishment of the American Indian Religious Freedom Act, which passed after his death in 1994 in order to legalize the use of ceremonial peyote.

== See also ==
- Eagle-bone whistle
- Employment Division v. Smith
- Freedom of religion in the United States § Native Americans
- Freedom of thought
- Hair drop, Native American Church regalia
- Indigenous peoples of the Americas
- Native American Church of New York
- Religion and drugs
- The red road
