= Quapaw =

Native American tribe in Oklahoma

Quapaw Ogáxpa
Total population
- 6,000

Regions with significant populations
- United States (Oklahoma)

Languages
- English, formerly Quapaw

Religion
- Christianity (Catholicism), traditional tribal religion, Big Moon and Little Moon Native American Church

Related ethnic groups
- Dhegihan Siouan peoples: Osage, Omaha, Ponca, Kansa

The Quapaw (/ˈkwɔːpɔː/ KWAW-paw, Quapaw: Ogáxpa) or Arkansas, officially the Quapaw Nation, is a U.S. federally recognized tribe comprising about 6,000 citizens. Also known as the Ogáxpa or “Downstream” people, their ancestral homelands are traced from what is now the Ohio River, west to the Mississippi River to present-day St. Louis, south across present-day Arkansas and eastern and southern Oklahoma. The government forcibly removed them from Arkansas Territory in 1834. The tribal capital is Quapaw, Oklahoma.

== Name ==
The Quapaw broke from the other Dhegiha tribes and migrated down the Mississippi River into present-day Arkansas many generations before European contact. After that, the tribe began to refer to themselves as "Ogáxpa", which means the “Downstream” people." This was the name of their primary village or tribal band. Historically, it was more common for the people to identify by the name of their village or band. However, Ogáxpa would also sometimes be used to refer to the entire tribe. Over time, it would become the accepted name for the entire tribe. Colonial French would sometimes write this name as "Kappa".

Algonquian-speaking people originally referred to the Quapaw as Akansa, an Illini word for “People of the South Wind”. As French explorers Jacques Marquette and Louis Jolliet encountered and interacted with the Illinois before they did the Quapaw, they adopted this exonym. Later the French voyageurs continued to use this term and adapted it as Arcansas. The French named the Arkansas River and Arkansas Post after the Quapaw. Other spellings in historical use included Akanza, Acansa, Acansea, Acansia, Accance, and Accancea.

English-speaking settlers who arrived later in the region adopted the name used by the French, adapting it to English spelling conventions. The term "Quapaw" comes from the American English attempt to say Ogáxpa.

== History ==
=== Beginnings (before 1682) ===
The Quapaw are descended from a historical group of Dhegiha-speaking people who lived in the lower Ohio River valley area. The modern descendants of this language group include the Omaha, Ponca, Osage and Kaw, who are all independent tribal nations today. All Dhegiha-speaking tribes are believed to have migrated west and south from the Ohio River valley after 1200 CE.

Scholars are divided as to whether they think the Quapaw and other related groups left before or after the Beaver Wars of the 17th century, in which the Five Nations of the Iroquois (based south of the Great Lakes and to the east of this area), drove other tribes out of the Ohio Valley and retained the area for hunting grounds. The oral history of the Quapaw people describes that the Quapaw separated from the Omaha, Ponca, Osage, and Kaw, near the confluence of the Missouri and Mississippi Rivers, due to a lack of game. No correlation with gun bearing Iroquois running the Quapaw into Arkansas along with the Omaha, Ponca, Osage and Kaw is described by historic or modern Quapaw sources, and appears to be an entirely modern conjecture by scholars which is unsupported by the Quapaw. Similar and supporting oral history is well documented and supported by other Dhegiha tribes. It is also notable that there are carbon dated sites which are strongly correlated to the Dhegiha which demonstrate they were split and moved to the respective regions by 1500.

The Quapaw reached their historical territory, the area of the confluence of the Arkansas and Mississippi rivers, at least by the mid-17th century. The timing of the Quapaw migration into their ancestral territory in the historical period has been the subject of considerable debate by scholars of various fields. It is referred to as the "Quapaw Paradox" by academics. Many professional archaeologists have introduced numerous migration scenarios and time frames, but none has conclusive evidence. Glottochronological studies suggest the Quapaw separated from the other Dhegihan-speaking peoples in a period ranging between AD 950 to as late as AD 1513. Linguistic studies also support an earlier separation date, within a few generations of the initial introduction of corn and long before the introduction of the horse.

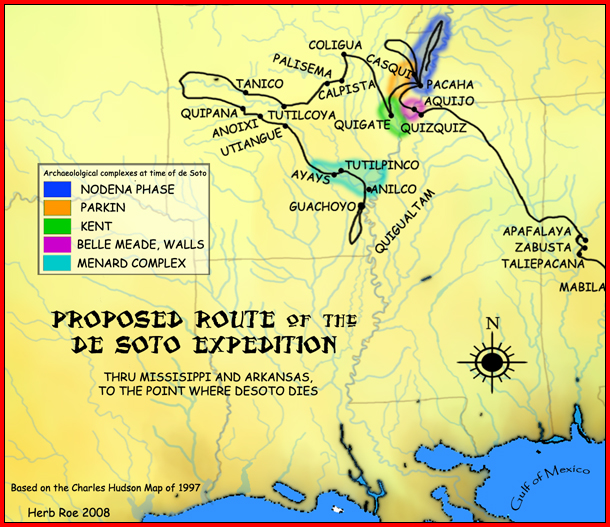
Map of the De Soto expedition through Mississippi and Arkansas

In 1541, Spanish explorer Hernando de Soto led an expedition that came across the town of Pacaha, between the Mississippi River and a lake on the Arkansas side. His party described the village as strongly palisaded and nearly surrounded by a ditch. Archaeological remains and local conditions in present-day Phillips County match this description. If the migration from the Ohio Valley preceded the entrada, these people may have been ancestors of the Quapaw.

The only chronicler of Indigenous heritage, Garcilaso, described this group as the Capaha. This chronicler was often more accurate that others when recording tribal information. Regardless, Dr. Rankin hypothesized that the Capaha may have been Tunica based on limited evidence of a single name found in a later Portuguese account, for which the original cursive is not recorded. Archeological sites around 1300 CE in the region have produced pipes, hides, and other items which are strongly associated with an influx of Dhegiha people that would be the Quapaw.

The first well-documented encounter between the Quapaw and Europeans occurred in 1673, when the Jesuit Father Jacques Marquette and French commander Louis Jolliet traveled down the Mississippi River by canoe. He reportedly went to the villages of the Akansea, who gave him a warm welcome and attentively listened to his sermons, while he stayed with them a few days. In 1682, La Salle passed by their villages, then five in number, including one on the east bank of the Mississippi River. Zenobius Membré, a Recollect father who accompanied the LaSalle expedition, planted a cross and attempted to convert the Native Americans to Christianity.

La Salle negotiated a peace with the tribe and formally "claimed" the territory for France. The Quapaw were recorded as uniformly kind and friendly toward the French. While villages relocated in the area, four Quapaw villages were generally reported by Europeans along the Mississippi River in this early period. They corresponded in name and population to four sub-tribes still existing, listed as Ugahpahti, Uzutiuhi, Tiwadimañ, and Tañwañzhita. The French transliterations were: Kappa, Ossoteoue, Touriman, and Tonginga.

=== Colonial era (1682–1803) ===
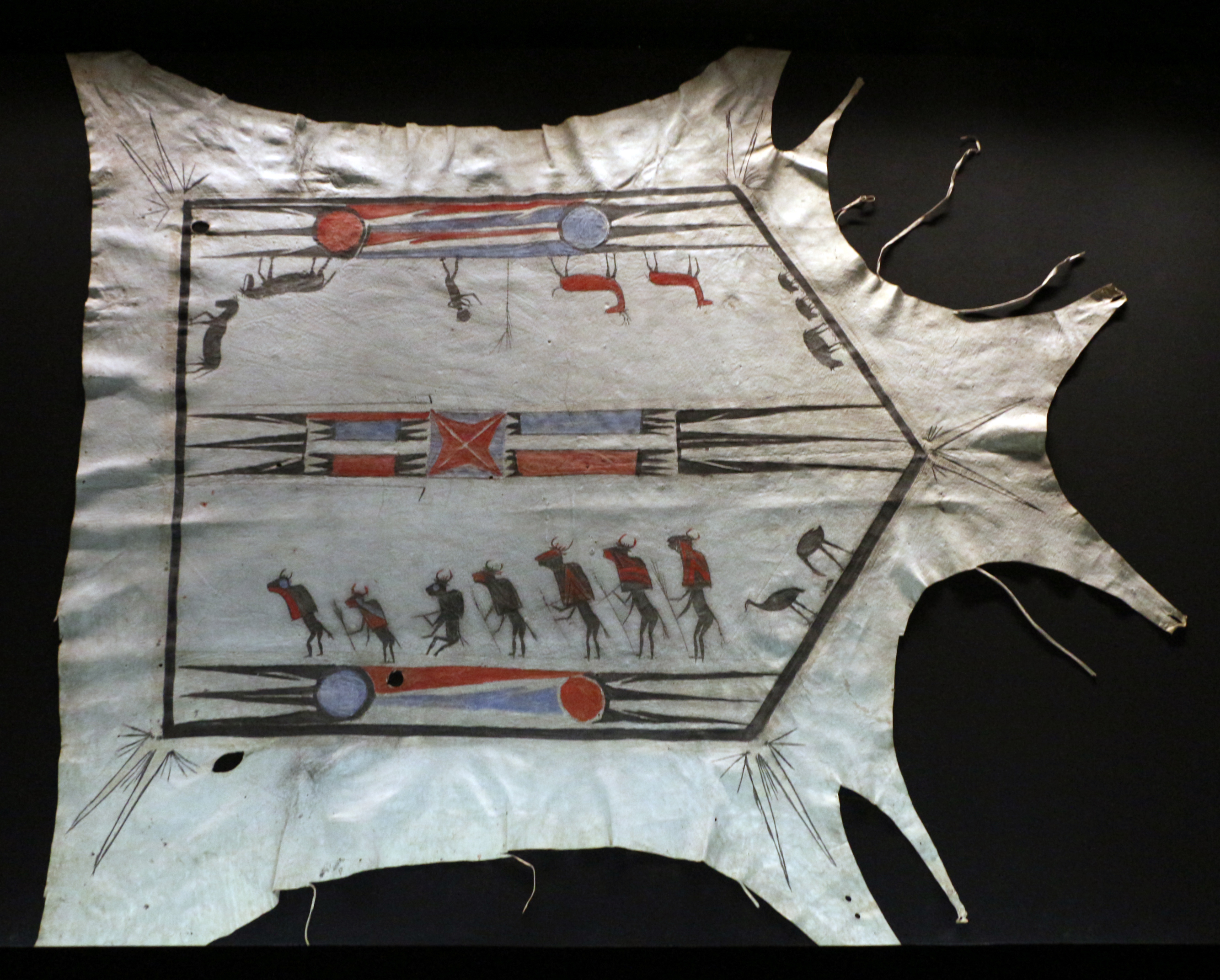
Robe of the Buffalo Dancers, c. 1750. Musée du Quai Branly—Jacques Chirac, Paris, France.

In 1686, at the request of the Quapaw, the French commander Henri de Tonti built a post near the mouth of the Arkansas River, which was later known as the Arkansas Post. This was the very first European settlement along the Mississippi River. This settlement was established at the Quapaw's design and request, primarily because the Quapaw wanted European firearms to use against their enemies who had already received them from the British. Tonti arranged for a resident Jesuit missionary to be assigned there, but apparently without result. About 1697, a smallpox epidemic killed the greater part of the women and children of two villages. In 1727, the Jesuits, from their house in New Orleans, again took up the missionary work.

The Quapaw were staunch allies of the French and backed them in regional conflicts. In 1729, the Quapaw allied with French colonists against the Natchez during the Natchez War, which was also referred to as the Natchez Revolt. This conflict ultimately involved multiple tribes allying with the French against the Natchez, ultimately resulting in the practical extermination of the Natchez tribe. The Quapaw also allied with France during the Chickasaw Wars, which spanned from 1721 to 1763.

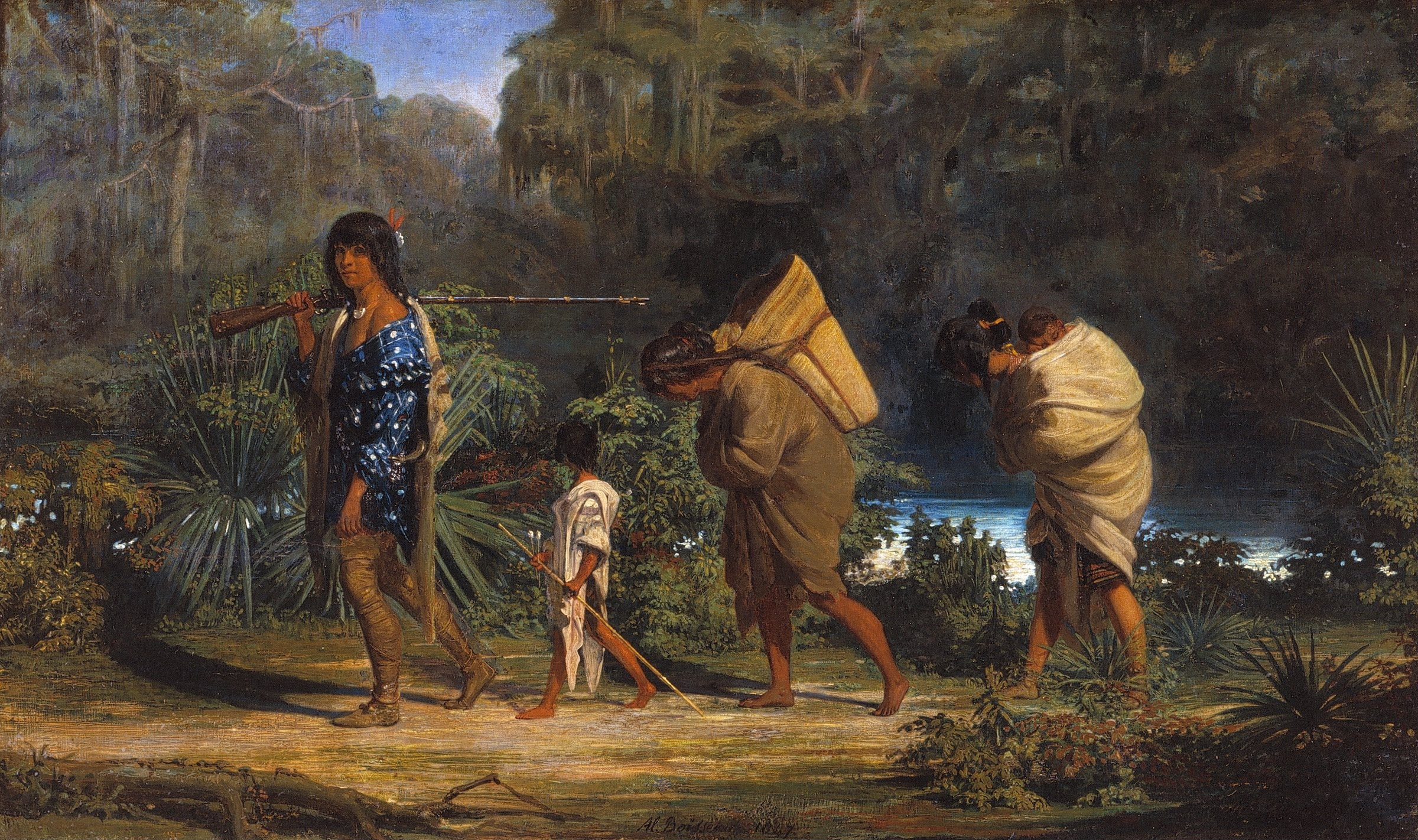
Louisiana Indians Walking Along a Bayou (note the tribe is not identified for this portrait. It is thought to be Choctaw, but could be Quapaw and if not, is very similar to what the Quapaw would have dressed in this period (Alfred Boisseau, 1847)

The French relocated the Arkansas Post upriver, both to avoid flooding and to maintain close proximity to the Quapaw who were also moving up the river for defensive purposes. After France was defeated by the British in the Seven Years' War, it ceded its North American territories to Britain and Spain. Spain took “control” of La Louisianne, which took included Arkansas and other former French territory west of the Mississippi River. The Spanish built new forts to protect its valued trading post with the Quapaw. Relationships with the Spanish were more strained than they had been with France due to a variety of complications. Eventually the Spanish and the Quapaw would come into good terms, however, and the Quapaw even signed a treaty during this time.

During the early years of colonial rule, many of the ethnic French fur traders and voyageurs had an amicable relationship with the Quapaw, as they did with many other trading tribes. Many Quapaw women and French men cohabitated. Pine Bluff, Arkansas, was founded by Joseph Bonne, a man of Quapaw-French ancestry.

=== 19th century ===
Shortly after the United States acquired the territory in 1803 by the Louisiana Purchase, it recorded the Quapaw as living in three villages on the south side of the Arkansas River about 12 miles (19 km) above Arkansas Post. In 1818. as part of a treaty negotiation, the U.S. government acknowledged the Quapaw as rightful owners of approximately 32 million acres (13 million ha), which included all of present-day Arkansas south and west of the Arkansas River, as well as portions of Louisiana, Mississippi, and Oklahoma from the Red River to beyond the Arkansas and east of the Mississippi. The treaty required the Quapaws to cede almost 31 million acres (13 million ha) of this area to the U.S. government, giving the Quapaw title to 1.5 million acres (0.61 million ha) between the Arkansas and the Saline in Southeast Arkansas. In exchange for the territory, the U.S. pledged $4,000 ($84,000 in today's dollars) and an annual payment of $1,000 ($21,000 in today's dollars). A transcription error in Congress later removed most of Grant County, Arkansas and part of Saline County, Arkansas from the Quapaw claim.

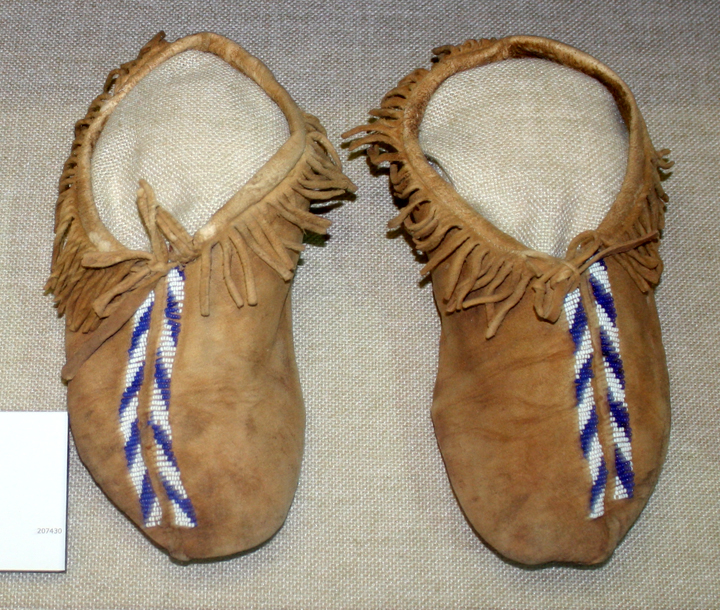
Quapaw men's beaded moccasins, c. 1900. Oklahoma History Center.

Under continued U.S. pressure, in 1824 they ceded this also, excepting 80 acres (320,000 m^{2}) occupied by the chief Saracen below Pine Bluff. They expected to incorporate with the Caddo of Louisiana, but were refused permission by the United States. Successive floods in the Caddo country near the Red River pushed many of the tribe toward starvation, and they wandered back to their old homes.

Sarrasin (alternate spelling Saracen), their last chief before the removal, was a Roman Catholic and friend of the Lazarist missionaries (Congregation of the Missions), who had arrived in 1818. He died about 1830 and is buried adjoining St. Joseph's Church, Pine Bluff. A a memorial window in the church preserves his name. Fr. John M. Odin was the pioneer Lazarist missionary among the Quapaw; he later served as the Catholic Archbishop of New Orleans.

In 1834, under another treaty and the federal policy of Indian Removal, the Quapaw were removed from the Mississippi valley areas to their present location in the northeast corner of Oklahoma, then Indian Territory.

In 1824, the Jesuits of Maryland, under Father Charles Van Quickenborne, took up work among the local and migrant tribes of Indian Territory (present-day Kansas and Oklahoma). In 1846, the Mission of St. Francis was established among the Osage, on Neosho River, by Fathers John Shoenmakers and John Bax. They extended their services to the Quapaw for some years.

=== 20th century ===
The Quapaw, together with other nearby tribes, the Miami, Seneca, Wyandot and Ottawa, were served from the Mission of "Saint Mary of the Quapaws", at Quapaw, Oklahoma. Historians estimated their number at European encounter as 5,000. The Catholic Encyclopedia noted the people had suffered from high fatalities due to epidemics, wars, removals, and social disruption. It documented their numbers as 3200 in 1687, 1600 in 1750, 476 in 1843, and 307 in 1910, including people of mixed-race.

The following passages from the early 20th-century Catholic Encyclopedia describe the Quapaw from the non-Native perspective of that time.

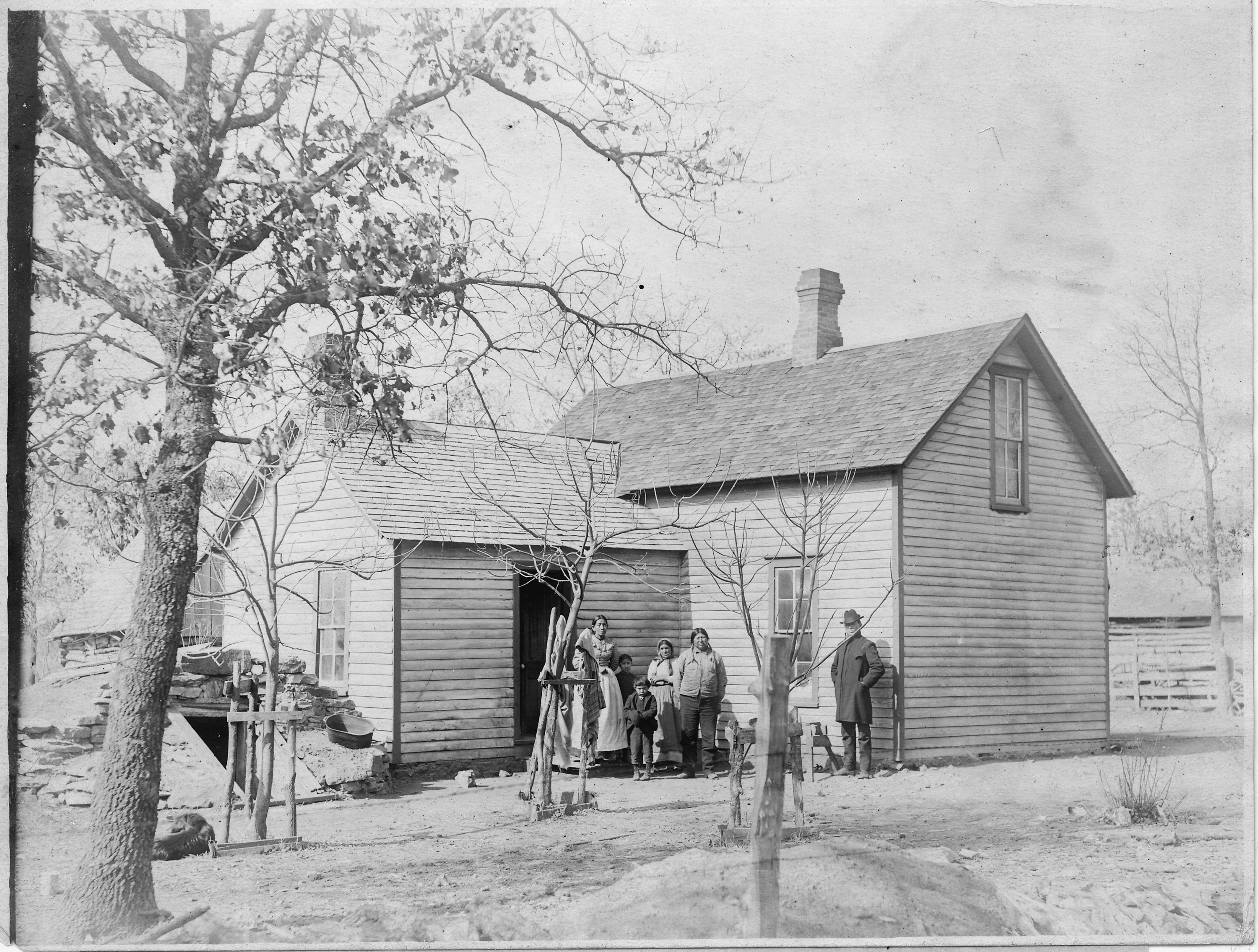
Peter Clabber, Principal Chief of Quapaws, 1905. National Archives.

A tribe now nearly extinct, but formerly one of the most important of the lower Mississippi region, occupying several villages about the mouth of the Arkansas, chiefly on the west (Arkansas) side, with one or two at various periods on the east (Mississippi) side of the Mississippi, and claiming the whole of the Arkansas River region up to the border of the territory held by the Osage in the north-western part of the state. They are of Siouan linguistic stock, speaking the same language, spoken also with dialectic variants, by the Osage and Kansa (Kaw) in the south and by the Omaha and Ponca in Nebraska. Their name properly is Ogaxpa, which signifies "down-stream people", as distinguished from Umahan or Omaha, "up-stream people". To the Illinois and other Algonquian tribes, they were known as 'Akansea', whence their French names of Akensas and Akansas. According to concurrent tradition of the cognate tribes, the Quapaw and their kinsmen originally lived far east, possibly beyond the Alleghenies, and, pushing gradually westward, descended the Ohio River – hence called by the Illinois the "river of the Akansea" – to its junction with the Mississippi, whence the Quapaw, then including the Osage and Kansa, descended to the mouth of the Arkansas, while the Omaha, with the Ponca, went up the Missouri.

== Government ==
Map of Quapaw Nation's tribal jurisdictional area (OTSA) and nearby jurisdiction areas.

The Quapaw Nation is headquartered in Quapaw, Oklahoma. The tribe governs an Oklahoma Tribal Statistical Area capital with a 13,000-acre (53 km^{2}) tribal jurisdictional area.

As of 2025, the current administration is:

- Chairman: Wena Supernaw
- Vice-Chairman: Jesse C. "Manz" McKibben
- Secretary Treasurer: Linda Valliere
- Business Committee Member: Joey Giveswater-Smith
- Business Committee Member: Linda Davis
- Business Committee Member: Larry Mercer
- Business Committee Member: Lloyd Buffalo

The Quapaw people elect a tribal council and the tribal chairman, who serves a two-year term. The governing body of the tribe is outlined in the governing resolutions of the tribe, which were voted upon and approved in 1956. Before 1956, the Quapaw Tribe operated on a chief system. The Chairman is Wena Supernaw. The Fourth of July weekend is also when the tribe convenes the annual general council meeting. Then, any Quapaw citizens 18 and older can vote on policies and resolutions of the Quapaw Nation.

The tribe operates a Tribal Court, Tribal Police Department, and a Fire Department. The tribe also operates the Quapaw Emergency Operations Center (EOC) which handles both all fire and EMS calls within the reservation, and within Ottawa County. The Quapaw Nation Marshal Service has also cross deputized with many local entities, including Cherokee County Sheriff's Office, Ottawa County Sheriff's Office, Oklahoma Highway Patrol, Miami Police, Miami Tribe, Commerce Police, Quapaw Police, and Grand River Dam Authority.

The tribe issues its own tribal vehicle tags for tribal citizens, and governmental vehicles. They also have their own housing authority, and tribal cemetery .

== Economy ==
The tribe owns two smoke shops and motor fuel outlets, known as the Quapaw C-Store and Downstream Q-Store. They also own and operate the Eagle Creek Golf Course and resort, located in Loma Linda, Missouri.

Their primary economic drivers have been their gaming casinos, established under federal and state law. The first two are both located in Quapaw: the Quapaw Casino and the Downstream Casino Resort. These have generated most of the revenue for the tribe, which they have used to support welfare, health, and education of their citizens. In 2012 the Quapaw Tribe's annual economic impact in the region was measured at more than $225,000,000.

In 2020 they completed a third casino, Saracen Casino Resort, located in Pine Bluff, Arkansas. It was the first purpose-built casino in the state. Constructed at a cost of $350 million, it will employ over 1,100 full-time staff.

The Quapaw Nation was also the first tribal nation in the United States to open and operate a USDA certified meat processing plant located on tribal territory, owned and operated by a tribal nation.

In the 20th century, the Quapaw leased some of their lands to European Americans, who developed them for industrial purposes. Before passage of environmental laws, toxic waste was deposited that has created long-term hazards. For instance, the Tar Creek Superfund site has been listed by the Environmental Protection Agency as requiring clean-up of environmental hazards. The Quapaw Nation took over cleanup of this superfund site in October 2023, when it would become the first tribal nation in the united states to lead remedial operations at a property on a superfund site.

== Demographics ==
=== Population ===
The Quapaw Nation has more than 6,000 enrolled tribal citizens. Approximately 1,000 live in the state of Oklahoma. Many tribal citizens live on the reservation, on family allotments, and in the towns of Quapaw, Oklahoma, and in Commerce, Oklahoma. Some tribal citizens live in Miami, Oklahoma which is located just off the Quapaw reservation, on land that originally belonged to the Quapaw Nation before the Treaty of 1867. Many tribal citizens live further away in Oklahoma, particularly in Tulsa and Oklahoma City. Many of the tribal citizens who live in those cities are often there because of their family seeking opportunities for employment and education, a process sometimes called urbanization.

Besides those living in Oklahoma, a significant number of tribal citizens live in nearby cities in Kansas and Missouri, with Baxter Springs and Joplin being especially close to the Quapaw reservation. Many tribal citizens also live in urban areas such as Chicago and in southern California as a result of the Indian Relocation Act of 1956, also known as Public Law 959. Citizenship in the tribe is based on lineal descent.

== Culture and society ==
The Quapaw people maintain traditions and culture that are present in all stages of life. The Quapaw people, culture, language, and land are all primarily centered today in the town of Quapaw. Native American people, such as the Quapaw, often view all four of these items as being interconnected and non-separable. Many Quapaw families carry on traditions that connect them to the countless generations of Quapaw who came before. In order to maintain and promote their way of life, some of these traditions take place in community events, and there are community classes and services which are offered by community members and by branches of the tribal government as well.

=== Tribal events and gatherings ===
The Quapaw people's primary annual event is a dance that is held during the Fourth of July weekend. This powwow was organized shortly after the American Civil War, It began as an annual gathering of local tribes with the Quapaw who had finally received rations. It continued as a traditional Quapaw dance and gathering hosted by various tribal families throughout the years. It was eventually hosted and funded by the Devils Promenade Indian Club. Ultimately the Quapaw Nation government would fund the gathering, and it is currently ran by an individual who is elected by the Quapaw people for their ability to organize the event, which includes traditional camping, gathering, and also features a large contest powwow which attracts participants from other tribes. 2022 was the 150th anniversary of this dance happening annually in the same general location. Common features of this powwow include gourd dance, war dance, stomp dance, and 49s. Other activities take place such as traditional Quapaw games including Indian football, handgame, traditional Quapaw footraces, Quapaw traditional dinners, turkey dance, Indian Dice, and other dances such as Quapaw Dance, and dances from other area tribes.

The Quapaw Nation also hosts additional events throughout the year, one of the largest events besides the annual powwow is the Quapaw Fall Gathering. This gathering began in 2020 as a way to have a social distanced annual gathering, as the July 4th event had been postponed due to the Covid-19 pandemic. Following this it has grown into an annual social event for the Quapaw people featuring historical and cultural discussions, as well as traditional games, and traditional foods. In 2024, the Quapaw Nation Culture Division in partnership with the Arkansas State Archives was able to feature a display of the 1824 Quapaw Treaty with the United States, on the 200th anniversary of the signing of this treaty. In addition to the treaty viewing, the event also featured a speeches, Quapaw Jeopardy, a Quapaw Nation Art Competition, a 5k and fun run, and a traditional Quapaw foot race, hand game, food, and dice game.

=== Cultural classes ===
The Quapaw host cultural events throughout the year, which are primarily held at the tribal museum. These include Indian dice games, traditional singing, and classes in traditional arts, such as finger weaving, shawl making, and flute making. In addition, Quapaw language classes are held there. The Quapaw Nation also hosts also efforts to maintain their culture. A significant manner of engaging Quapaw youth is the Camp Quapaw, an annual summer program that brings together Quapaw youth and other area community members.

=== Language ===
The traditional Quapaw language is part of the Dhegiha branch of the Siouan language family. The cognate languages in this family include the modern day Ponca, Omaha, Kaw, and Osage. Though revitalization efforts are underway, Quapaw is considered a dormant language as it is no longer spoken at home, and children do not learn the language as their primary language.

Quapaw was well documented in fieldnotes and publications from many individuals, including George Izard in 1827, Lewis F. Hadley in 1882, 19th-century linguist James Owen Dorsey, Frank T. Siebert in 1940, and linguist Robert Rankin in the 1970s. Rev. J.O. Dorsey published material about it under the auspices of the Bureau of American Ethnology, now part of the Smithsonian Institution.

Other efforts at language preservation and revitalization are being undertaken. In 2011 the Quapaw participated in the first annual Dhegiha Gathering. The Osage language program hosted and organized the gathering, held at the Quapaw tribe's Downstream Casino. Language-learning techniques and other issues were discussed and taught in workshops at the conference among the five cognate tribes. The 2012 Annual Dhegiha Gathering was also held at Downstream Casino. To revive the language, the tribe is conducting classes in Quapaw at the tribal museum. An online audio lexicon of the Quapaw language was created by editing old recordings of first language speakers speaking the language.

In 2024 the Quapaw Nation Culture Division formed a Language Department. This resulted in the hiring of a Language Department Director and the re-initiation of community language classes and services.

== Notable people ==
- Louis Ballard, (Quapaw/Cherokee, 1931–2007) composer, artist, and educator
- Betty Gaedtke, traditional potter
- Victor Griffin (c. 1873–1958), chief, interpreter, and peyote roadman
- Barbara Kyser-Collier, tribal governmental figure
- Ardina Moore (Quapaw/Osage), language teacher, regalia maker/textile artist
- Saracen, war chief and recipient of a presidential medal
- Tall Chief (c. 1840–1918), chief, peyote roadman
- Guy Barker (politician) Quapaw-American Politician
- Joseph Tali Byrd Quapaw-Cherokee Politician

== See also ==
- Robert Whitebird Cultural Center
- Mitchigamea
- Quapaw Indian Agency
- USS Quapaw (AT-110)
