= Indian Handcraft Series =

Educational booklets produced 1940–1945

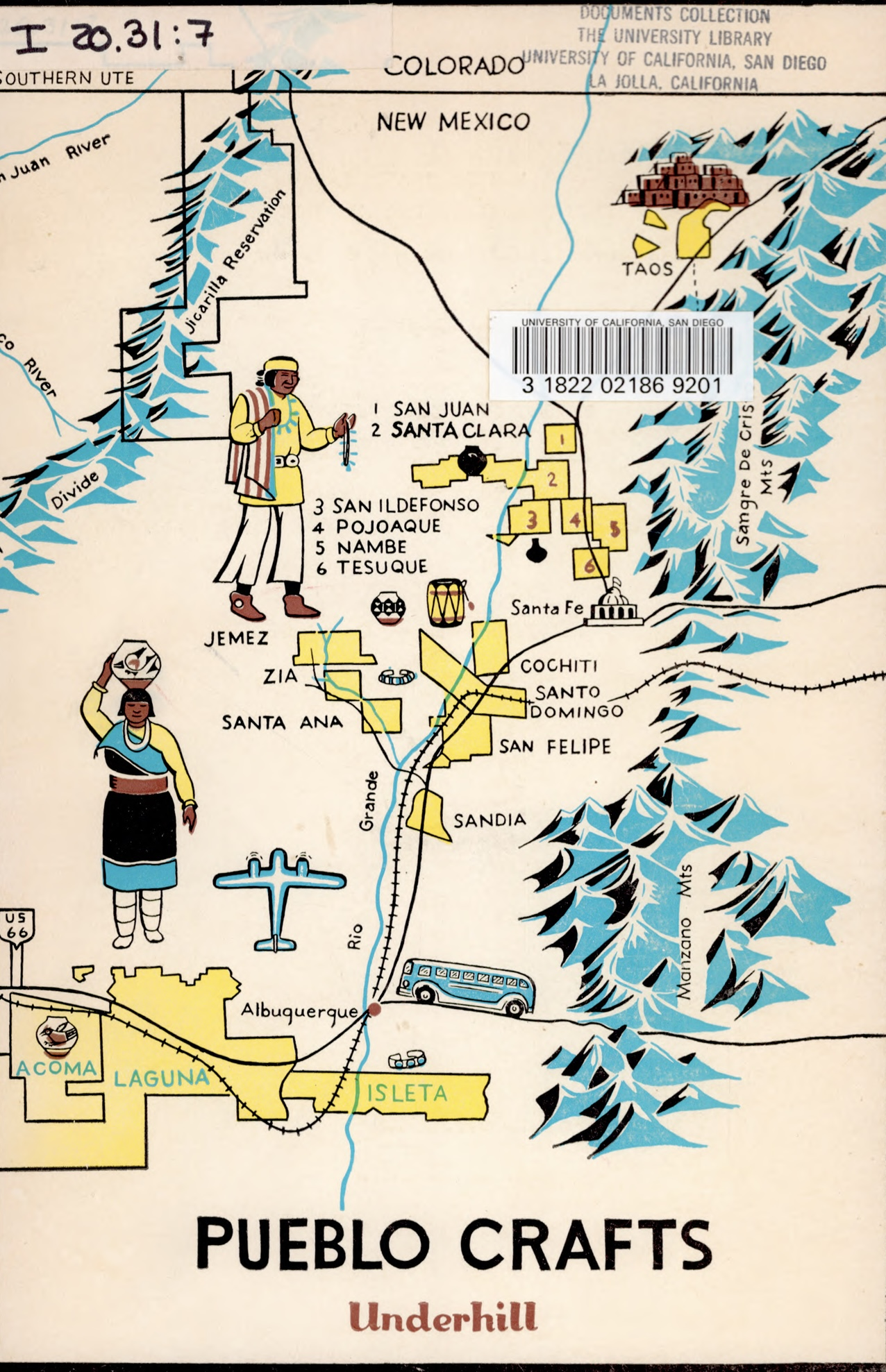
Cover of Indian Handcraft Series booklet Pueblo Crafts (1944) by Ruth Underhill

Indian Handcraft Series is a series of pamphlets produced between 1940 and 1945 by the Education Department of the United States Bureau of Indian Affairs.

The Indian Handcraft Series booklets outlined techniques and practices used by indigenous creators to produce baskets, clothing and other goods. The intended audience was Native Americans themselves, in an effort to promote a revival of traditional practices; the booklets were used as instructional materials in Indian schools. The Indian Handcraft Series was one of three related series produced by the BIA education department, the others being bilingual Indian Life Readers produced under the direction of children's book author Ann Nolan Clark and the ethnographic Sherman Pamphlet Series, largely written by Ruth Underhill.

Titles:

- Quill and Beadwork of the Western Sioux, by Carrie A. Lyford
- Navajo Native Dyes, by Nonabah Bryan and Stella Young
- Seneca Splint Basketry, by Marjorie Lismer
- Ojibwa Crafts (Chippewa), by Carrie A . Lyford
- Iroquois Crafts, by Carrie A. Lyford
- Pueblo Crafts, by Ruth Underhill
- Spruce Root Basketry of the Alaska Tlingit, by Frances Paul
- Blackfeet Crafts, by John C. Ewers

== See also ==
- Indian Arts and Crafts Board
