= Saracen Casino Resort =

Casino in Pine Bluff, Arkansas, United States

- Location within Arkansas Location within the United States
- Interactive map of Saracen Casino Resort
- Location: Pine Bluff, Arkansas; 1 Saracen Resort Drive; 34°12′38.37″N 91°57′53.93″W
- Opened: Saracen Casino Annex and Q-Store (2019); Saracen Casino Resort (2020)
- Casino type: Land
- Owner: Quapaw Nation
- Website: Official website

Saracen Casino Resort is a casino in Pine Bluff, Arkansas, United States. The first purpose-built casino in Arkansas is owned by the Quapaw Nation, and named for Saracen, a Quapaw chief in the 1800s.

== History ==
The first section of the casino, the 15,000-square-foot (1,400 m^{2}) Saracen Casino Annex and Q-Store, opened in September 2019, and contains 300 slot machines.

A second section, the 200,000-square-foot (19,000 m^{2}) Saracen Casino Resort, opened across the street in 2020, and is built on a former soybean field. Saracen Casino Resort cost $350 million to build, employed over 1,000 construction workers, and was the largest construction project in 2020 in Arkansas. Saracen Casino Resort has 2,100 slot machines, 30 gaming tables, a poker room, a sportsbook, and eight restaurants, of which four are located in a food court called "The Post". The casino will employ over 1,100 full-time staff, and artwork at the casino is designed "to pay homage to the Native American and African American cultures".

Saracen's 2019 license application included a 300-room hotel with restaurants, lounges, spa, conference center, museum, and cultural center. At the time the application was approved, the hotel was expected to have been completed in 2021, and delays led construction to begin in 2023, with completion expected in 2025. The 13-story project will be larger than initially planned, with over 300 rooms, one half to be suites.
