= John Wilson (Caddo) =

Caddo-Delaware-French medicine man and religious leader

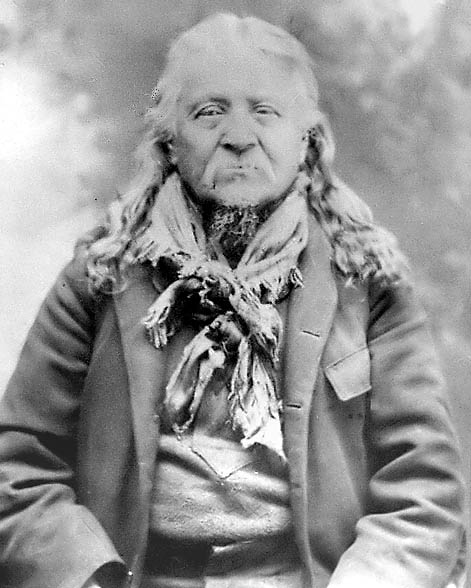
John Wilson, Indian Territory, ca. 1900

"John Wilson the Revealer of Peyote" (c.1845–1901) was a Caddo medicine man who introduced the Peyote plant into a religion, became a major leader in the Ghost Dance, and introduced a new peyote ceremony with teachings of Christ. John Wilson's Caddo name was Nishkû'ntu, meaning "Moon Head."

Though he was of half-Lenape descent, quarter-blood French, and quarter-blood Caddo, John Wilson spoke only the Caddo language and identified only as a Caddo. He is believed to have been born in 1845, when his band of Caddo were still living in Texas. They were driven into Indian Territory in 1859.

Wilson, being interested in religion and only known as a medicine man, sought out a path to be a peyote roadman in 1880. As the Ghost Dance ceremonies regained popularity in Oklahoma, he became one of its most active leaders in the Indian Territory.

During a two-week period, Wilson consumed peyote for spiritual reasons and said he was shown essential astronomical symbols representing the life of Jesus Christ. These messages became part of his own teaching, which nevertheless remained reliant purely on peyote. He recalled that Peyote spoke to him, telling him to keep indulging in, and to keep walking in its "road" until the day he died of the peyote to create a higher enlightenment.

The tribe had been exposed to the Half Moon peyote ceremony, but Wilson introduced the Big Moon ceremony to the tribe. The Caddo tribe remains very active in the Native American Church today.

He is the single human most known for the changes to the religious altar and the peyote ceremony. His changes to the altar, unintentionally persuaded the image of the cross in Christian churches.

Wilson died at the age of 61 in 1901. He was killed with two other people when the wagon he was riding in was hit by a train.
